= South Carolina Highway 56 =

Road in South Carolina

South Carolina Highway 56

- Route of SC 56 highlighted in red

Route information
- Maintained by SCDOT
- Length: 63.700 mi (102.515 km)
- Existed: 1928–present

Major junctions
- South end: SC 39 near Chappells
- US 76 in Clinton; I-26 in Clinton; US 221 in Spartanburg; US 29 in Spartanburg; I-85 BL near Spartanburg
- North end: US 176 on the Southern Shops–Valley Falls line

Location
- Country: United States
- State: South Carolina
- Counties: Newberry, Laurens, Union, Spartanburg

Highway system
- South Carolina State Highway System; Interstate; US; State; Scenic
← SC 55	→ SC 57

South Carolina Highway 56 (SC 56) is a 63.700-mile (102.515 km) primary state highway in the state of South Carolina. The highway provides a back country alternative to Interstate 26 (I-26) from Clinton to Spartanburg.

== Route description ==
SC 56 is generally a two-lane rural highway that expands to a four-lane urban highway in Clinton and Spartanburg. It travels 63.3 miles (101.9 km) in a north–south direction, though it is signed east–west; to make it more confusing, signage in Spartanburg reverse the directions. SC 56 has a roundabout interchange, known as Hearon Circle, with I-85 Business. In Clinton, signage that bypasses the downtown area use "TRUCK" instead of normal or bypass banners; though SC 56 Business is signed through the downtown area.

== History ==
SC 56 was established in 1928 as a new primary route from SC 392 (today SC 39) to U.S. Route 176 (US 176) in Pauline. In 1949, SC 56 was extended north, replacing US 176 to US 29 in Spartanburg. In 1959, SC 56 was extended north, replacing US 176 along Asheville Highway to its current terminus at US 176. Sometime after 1990, SC 56 was bypassed southeast of downtown Clinton, leaving a business loop.

== Major intersections ==
County	Location	mi	km	Destinations	Notes
Newberry		0.000	0.000	SC 39 – Saluda, Cross Hill, Laurens	Southern terminus
Laurens		9.810	15.788	SC 560 (Milton Road) – Cross Hill, Kinards	
Laurens		14.330	23.062	SC 66 east (Milton Road) – Joanna	Western terminus of SC 66
Laurens		14.560	23.432	SC 66 Conn. east to SC 66	Western terminus of SC 66 Conn.
Laurens	Clinton	18.870	30.368	SC 72 west (Springdale Road) / SC 56 Bus. east (Jacobs Highway) – Business district	Southern end of SC 72 concurrency; southern terminus of SC 56 Bus.
Laurens	Clinton	20.270	32.621	US 76 (Carolina Avenue) – Newberry, Business district	
Laurens	Clinton	21.970	35.357	SC 72 east / SC 72 Bus. west (Willard Road) to I-26 east – Whitmire	Northern end of SC 72 concurrency
Laurens	Clinton	22.760	36.629	SC 56 Bus. west (Musgrove Street)	Eastern terminus of SC 56 Bus.
Laurens	Clinton	23.797– 23.860	38.298– 38.399	I-26 – Spartanburg, Columbia	I-26 exit 52
Union	No major junctions				
Spartanburg	Cross Anchor	33.530	53.961	SC 49 (Union Highway) – Laurens, Union	
Spartanburg		33.850	54.476	SC 146 west (Cross Anchor Highway) – Woodruff	Eastern terminus of SC 146
Spartanburg		45.060	72.517	SC 150 north (Glenn Springs Road) – Pacolet	Southern terminus of SC 150
Spartanburg	Pauline	47.910	77.104	SC 215 south – West Springs, Union	Southern end of SC 215 concurrency
Spartanburg		48.980	78.826	SC 215 north (Stone Station Road) – Roebuck	Northern end of SC 215 concurrency
Spartanburg	Spartanburg	54.950	88.433	SC 295 (Southport Road) – Roebuck, Pacolet	
Spartanburg	Spartanburg	57.720	92.891	East Henry Street east (SC 56 Conn. east) to US 176 – Union	Western terminus of SC 56 Conn.; SC 56 and SC 56 Conn. share the East Henry Street name.
Spartanburg	Spartanburg	58.170	93.616	US 221 south (Church Street) – Columbia	Southern end of US 221 concurrency
Spartanburg	Spartanburg	58.550	94.227	US 29 (St. John Street) – Barnet Park, Chapman Center, Converse College, The George	
Spartanburg	Spartanburg	58.770	94.581	SC 296 (Daniel Morgan Avenue) – Roebuck	
Spartanburg	Spartanburg	59.460	95.692	US 221 north (Church Street) – Chesnee, Charlotte	Northern end of US 221 concurrency
Spartanburg		61.760– 61.800	99.393– 99.457	I-85 BL – Greenville, Charlotte	Roundabout interchange; I-85 Bus. exit 4
Spartanburg	Southern Shops–Valley Falls line	63.540– 63.700	102.258– 102.515	US 176 (Pine Street) to I-26 / I-85 – Inman, Asheville, Spartanburg	Northern terminus
1.000 mi = 1.609 km; 1.000 km = 0.621 mi: Concurrency terminus

== Special routes ==
=== Clinton business loop ===
South Carolina Highway 56 Business
- Location: Clinton, South Carolina
- Length: 3.090 mi (4.973 km)

South Carolina Highway 56 Business (SC 56 Bus.) is a 3.090-mile (4.973 km) business route that traverses through downtown Clinton, in concurrency with SC 72 Bus. along Broad Street and Willard Road.

County	Location	mi	km	Destinations	Notes
Laurens	Clinton	0.000	0.000	SC 56 / SC 72 – Greenwood, Saluda	Southern Terminus
Laurens	Clinton	0.441	0.710	SC 72 Bus. west (South Broad Street) – Greenwood	Southern end of SC 72 Bus. Concurrency
Laurens	Clinton	2.100	3.380	US 76 (West Carolina Avenue) – Laurens, Newberry	
Laurens	Clinton	2.671	4.299	SC 308 begins (North Broad Street) to I-385 – Ora	Southern terminus of SC 308
Laurens	Clinton	3.014	4.851	SC 72 Bus. east to I-26 east – Charlotte, Columbia	Northern end of SC 72 Bus. Concurrency
Laurens	Clinton	3.090	4.973	SC 56 to I-26 west / I-385 north – Spartanburg	Northern terminus
Laurens	Clinton	1.000 mi = 1.609 km; 1.000 km = 0.621 mi: Concurrency terminus			

=== Spartanburg connector route ===
South Carolina Highway 56 Connector
- Location: Spartanburg
- Length: 0.330 mi (531 m)

South Carolina Highway 56 Connector (SC 56 Conn.) is a 0.330-mile (0.531 km) connector route between SC 56 and US 176/SC 9 in the central part of Spartanburg and the east-central part of Spartanburg. The entire length is known as East Henry Street and is an unsigned highway.

It begins at an intersection with the SC 56 mainline (known as Union Street east of here and also as East Henry Street west of here). It travels to the east-northeast and curves to the northeast, before reaching its eastern terminus, an intersection with US 176/SC 9 (South Pine Street). Here, the roadway continues as Glendalyn Avenue.

The entire route is in Spartanburg, Spartanburg County.

mi	km	Destinations	Notes
0.000	0.000	SC 56 (Union Street south / East Henry Street west) to US 221 / SC 296 – Clinton, South Carolina School for the Deaf and Blind, Reidville, Inman	Western terminus; SC 56 and SC 56 Conn. share the East Henry Street name.
0.330	0.531	US 176 / SC 9 (South Pine Street) / Glendalyn Avenue east	Eastern terminus; roadway continues as Glendalyn Avenue.
1.000 mi = 1.609 km; 1.000 km = 0.621 mi
