= U.S. Route 76 in South Carolina =

State highway in South Carolina

U.S. Highway 76
- Route of US 76 in South Carolina highlighted in red

Route information
- Maintained by SCDOT
- Length: 297.9 mi (479.4 km)
- Existed: 1926–present
- Tourist routes: SC Heritage Corridor: Discovery Route

Major junctions
- West end: US 76 / SR 2 at the Georgia state line near Clayton
- I-85 near Anderson; I-26 / US 176 in Irmo; I-20 on the Seven Oaks–St. Andrews city line; I-26 / I-126 near West Columbia; US 1 / US 378 in Columbia; US 15 / US 401 / US 378 / US 521 in Sumter; I-95 near Florence
- East end: US 76 at the North Carolina state line near Fair Bluff, NC

Location
- Country: United States
- State: South Carolina
- Counties: Oconee, Pickens, Anderson, Greenville, Laurens, Newberry, Richland, Lexington, Sumter, Lee, Florence, Marion, Horry

Highway system
- United States Numbered Highway System; List; Special; Divided; South Carolina State Highway System; Interstate; US; State; Scenic
← SC 75	→ I-77

U.S. Route 76 (US 76) is an east–west U.S. highway in the U.S. state of South Carolina. Being one of the longest and most important highways in the state, it connects the cities of Anderson, Columbia, Sumter and Florence.

== Route description ==
US 76 enters South Carolina across the Chattooga River, then continues southeast toward Westminster. This segment is a moderately windy two-lane road. In Westminster, it heads east toward Seneca and Clemson. From Clemson, the road heads southeast toward Anderson, intersecting Interstate 85 (I-85), then east toward the small towns of Belton and Honea Path. US 76 is a four-lane highway from Westminster to Anderson. In Anderson, the road widens to six lanes with a reversible turn lane. After a concurrency with US 178, the road narrows to five lanes, and, as it goes south towards downtown Anderson, it narrows again to four. However, the sections around Seneca, Clemson, and Anderson are well developed with many traffic lights. It travels concurrent with US 123 from Westminster to Clemson, SC 28 from Seneca to Anderson, and US 178 from Anderson to Honea Path.

From Honea Path, the highway heads east to Laurens. This section is a rural two-lane road that is not frequently traveled. From Laurens, US 76 roughly parallels I-385 and I-26 as it heads to Columbia. US 76 provides local access to the communities of Laurens, Clinton, Newberry, Prosperity, Chapin, and the other smaller towns in the area. In Irmo, US 76 travels concurrent with US 176, then continues on to I-26, with which it travels concurrent. After the interchange with I-20, US 76 splits off from I-26 and continues into downtown Columbia concurrent with I-126.

In Columbia, US 76 follows Elmwood Avenue, Bull Street, Gervais Street, Millwood Avenue, and Devine Street, before heading east toward Sumter. The segment from Columbia to Sumter is a four-lane highway and US 76 is concurrent with US 378 from the intersection of Bull and Gervais near the University of South Carolina in Columbia all the way to Sumter. From Sumter, US 76 heads northeast to Florence. US 76 is the major road through Florence. It then continues east out of Florence to the small towns of Marion and Mullins, then into North Carolina. The highway is concurrent with US 301 from Florence to across the Pee Dee River.

== History ==
Formerly, US 76 followed a longer route from Westminster to Pendleton. From Westminster, the old route followed S-37-13 through the Richland community, then its current alignment to SC 59 into downtown Seneca, then SC 130 out of Seneca to S-37-1, then its current alignment to SC 93 toward Clemson University, then SC 28 Business through Pendleton.

== Major intersections ==
County	Location	mi	km	Exit	Destinations	Notes
Oconee		0.0	0.0		US 76 west / SR 2 west – Clayton	Continuation from Georgia over the Chattooga River
Oconee	Westminster	17.5	28.2		US 123 south (Toccoa Highway) – Toccoa	South end of US 123 overlap
Oconee	Westminster	17.7	28.5		SC 183 north (Westminster Highway) – Walhalla	
Oconee	Westminster	18.8	30.3		SC 24 east (Oak Highway) – Townville	
Oconee		21.7	34.9		SC 11 (Cherokee Foothills Scenic Highway) – Walhalla	
Oconee	Seneca	25.8	41.5		SC 28 west (Blue Ridge Boulevard) / SC 59 south (North 1st Street) – Walhalla, Seneca	West end of SC 28 overlap
Oconee	Seneca	28.3	45.5		SC 130 (North 1st Street) – Salem, Seneca	
Oconee		32.7	52.6		SC 93 east – Clemson	To Clemson University
Pickens	Clemson	34.5	55.5		SC 133 north (College Avenue) – Six Mile, Clemson	To Clemson University and John C. Calhoun Home
Pickens	Clemson	34.9	56.2		US 123 north (Tiger Boulevard) – Easley, Greenville	North end of US 123 overlap
Pickens	Clemson	35.6	57.3		SC 93 (Old Greenville Highway) – Central, Norris	To Clemson University
Pickens	Clemson	36.1	58.1		SC 28 Bus. east (Pendleton Road) – Pendleton	
Anderson	Pendleton	36.1	58.1		SC 28 Bus. west (Mechanic Street) – Pendleton	
Anderson		40.1	64.5		SC 187 south	
Anderson		46.0	74.0		I-85 – Atlanta, Greenville	
Anderson		47.7	76.8		SC 28 east – Starr, Abbeville	East end of SC 28 and west end of SC 28 Business overlap
Anderson		47.7	76.8		SC 28 east (Pearman Dairy Road) – Starr, Abbeville	East end of SC 28 and west end of SC 28 Business overlap
Anderson	Anderson	48.5	78.1		US 178 west (Liberty Highway) – Liberty	West end of US 178 overlap
Anderson	Anderson	49.8	80.1		SC 28 Bus. east (Main Street)	East end of SC 28 Business overlap
Anderson	Anderson	52.1	83.8		US 29 Bus. north / SC 81 north (Greenville Street)	North end of US 29 Business and SC 81 overlap
Anderson	Anderson	52.4	84.3		SC 24 (Whitner Street)	
Anderson	Anderson	52.7	84.8		SC 81 south (Murray Street) – Starr	South end of US 29 Business and SC 81 overlap
Anderson	Anderson	52.7	84.8		SC 28 Bus. (Main Street) – Abbeville, Augusta	
Anderson	Anderson	54.0	86.9		US 29 south (Shockley Ferry Road)	South end of US 29 overlap
Anderson	Anderson	54.6	87.9		US 29 north	North end of US 29 overlap
Anderson		58.2	93.7		SC 252 east – Honea Path	
Anderson		61.1	98.3		SC 413 – Iva	
Anderson	Belton	63.6	102.4		SC 20 east (Brown Avenue) – Due West	East end of SC 20 overlap
Anderson	Belton	63.7	102.5		SC 20 west (Main Street) – Williamston	West end of SC 20 overlap
Anderson	Honea Path	71.7	115.4		SC 252 west (Greer Street) – Anderson	West end of SC 252 overlap
Anderson	Honea Path	71.8	115.6		US 178 east (Church Street) – Due West, Greenwood	East end of US 178 overlap
Anderson	Honea Path	72.3	116.4		SC 252 east (Greer Street) – Ware Shoals	East end of SC 252 overlap
Greenville		78.9	127.0		US 25 north (Augusta Road) – Greenville	North end of US 25 overlap
Greenville	Princeton	80.1	128.9		US 25 south (Augusta Road) – Ware Shoals, Greenwood	South end of US 25 overlap
Laurens	Hickory Tavern	86.2	138.7		SC 101 north / Neely Ferry Road – Gray Court, Waterloo	
Laurens	Laurens	94.0	151.3		SC 252 west – Ware Shoals	
Laurens	Laurens	95.4	153.5		US 76 Bus. east (Main Street)	
Laurens	Laurens	96.7	155.6		SC 14 north (Church Street) – Greenville	North end of SC 14 overlap
Laurens	Laurens	96.9	155.9		SC 14 south (Church Street) – Laurens, Greenwood	South end of SC 14 overlap
Laurens	Laurens	97.7	157.2		US 221 (Harper Street) – Woodruff, Spartanburg, Greenwood	
Laurens	Laurens	99.5	160.1		US 76 Bus. west (Main Street) / SC 127 south – Laurens, Greenwood	
Laurens	Clinton	105.9	170.4		SC 56 Bus. / SC 72 Bus. (Broad Street) to I-385 / I-26 – Whitmire, Spartanburg, Greenwood, Saluda	
Laurens	Clinton	107.7	173.3		SC 56 / SC 72 (Springdale Drive) – Whitmire, Spartanburg, Greenwood, Saluda	
Laurens	Joanna	111.8	179.9		SC 66 (Whitmire Highway) – Whitmire, Chappells	
Newberry	Kinards	114.9	184.9		SC 560 west – Cross Hill	
Newberry	Newberry	125.7	202.3		SC 121 (College Street) – Whitmire, Newberry	
Newberry	Newberry	127.7	205.5		SC 34 east (Winnsboro Road) – Winnsboro	East end of SC 34 overlap
Newberry	Newberry	127.9	205.8		SC 219 east (Main Street) – Pomaria	
Newberry	Newberry	128.6	207.0		SC 34 west (Dixie Drive) – Greenwood	West end of SC 34 overlap
Newberry	Prosperity	133.5	214.8		SC 391 south (Main Street) – Batesburg-Leesville	
Newberry		137.2	220.8		SC 773 north – Pomaria	
Newberry	Little Mountain	141.6	227.9		SC 202 east – Pomaria	
Richland	Ballentine	154.3	248.3		SC 6 east (Dreher Shoals Road) – Lexington	
Richland	Irmo	155.5	250.3		US 176 west (Broad River Road) – Pomaria	West end of US 176 overlap
Richland	Irmo	158.3	254.8	101	I-26 west / US 176 east (Broad River Road) – Spartanburg, Columbia	West end of I-26 and east end of US 176 overlap Signed as exits 101A (west) and 101B (east)
Richland	Irmo	159.1	256.0	102	SC 60 (Lake Murray Boulevard) – Irmo	Signed as exits 102A (west) and 102B (east)
Richland	Irmo	160.3	258.0	103	Harbison Boulevard	
Lexington		161.2	259.4	104	Piney Grove Road	
Lexington		163.3	262.8	106	St. Andrews Road	
Richland	Columbia	164.0	263.9	107	I-20 – Augusta, Florence	Signed as exits 107A (west) and 107B (east)
Richland	Columbia	164.5	264.7	108A	Bush River Road	
Richland	Columbia	164.8	265.2	108B	I-26 east – Charleston, Airport	East end of I-26 and west end of I-126 overlap
Richland	Columbia	165.6	266.5		Colonial Life Boulevard to Bush River Road	Westbound exit and eastbound entrance
Richland	Columbia	166.7	268.3		Greystone Boulevard – Riverbanks Zoo	
Richland	Columbia	168.2	270.7		US 21 south / US 176 east / US 321 south (Huger Street)	East end of I-126/US 176 and south end of US 21/US 321 overlap
Richland	Columbia	168.8	271.7		SC 48 east (Assembly Street)	
Richland	Columbia	168.9	271.8		US 21 north / US 176 west / US 321 north (Main Street) – Chester, Rock Hill	US 176 and North end of US 21/US 321 and west end of US 176 overlap
Richland	Columbia	169.2	272.3		SC 277 north (Bull Street) to I-20 / I-77	
Richland	Columbia	169.7	273.1		SC 12 (Taylors Street) – Lexington	To Fort Jackson
Richland	Columbia	170.1	273.7		US 1 south / US 378 west (Gervais Street)	South end of US 1 and west end of US 378 overlap
Richland	Columbia	171.0	275.2		US 1 north (Millwood Avenue) – Camden	North end of US 1 overlap
Richland	Columbia	172.4	277.5		Devine Street west (US 21 Conn. west / US 76 Conn. west) to US 21 / US 321 / Millwood Avenue ends	Eastern terminus of US 21 Conn. and western segment of US 76 Conn., which use Devine Street
Richland	Columbia	173.3	278.9		SC 16 (Beltline Boulevard)	
Richland	Columbia	173.5	279.2		SC 760 east (Fort Jackson Boulevard) / Cross Hill Road north (US 76 Conn. west) – Fort Jackson	Eastern terminus of central segment of US 76 Conn.; western terminus of SC 760
Richland	Columbia				Rosewood Drive west / Wildcat Road east (US 76 Conn.) – Midlands Technical College Beltline Campus, Jim Hamilton–L.B. Owens Airport, Fort Jackson	Eastern segment of US 76 Conn.
Richland	Columbia	175.1	281.8		SC 262 east (Leesburg Road) – Leesburg	
Richland	Columbia	175.3	282.1		I-77 – Charleston, Charlotte	
Richland	Columbia	177.5	285.7		SC 768 west (Pineview Road)	
Richland	Horrell Hill	182.6	293.9		SC 769 east (Congaree Road) – Congaree	
Richland		187.0	300.9		SC 764 east (Old Eastover Road) – Eastover	
Richland		191.9	308.8		US 601 (McCords Ferry Road) – St. Matthews, Camden	
Richland		194.2	312.5		SC 263 south (Vanboklen Road) – Eastover	
Sumter	Stateburg	201.4	324.1		SC 261 – Wedgefield, Horatio, Camden, Manning	
Sumter	Sumter	203.0	326.7		SC 441 (Patriot Parkway) – Bishopville	
Sumter	Sumter	203.4	327.3		Shaw Drive	To Shaw Air Force Base
Sumter	Sumter	209.7	337.5		SC 120 west (Alice Drive) – Pinewood	
Sumter	Sumter	210.2	338.3		US 521 / US 76 Bus. east (Broad Street) – Sumter, Camden	
Sumter	Sumter	212.4	341.8		US 15 (Main Street) – Bishopville	Exit ramps connect via frontage roads
Sumter	Sumter	214.0	344.4		US 401 (Oswego Road) – Darlington	Exit ramps connect via frontage roads
Sumter	Sumter	215.0	346.0		US 378 east / US 76 Bus. west (Liberty Street) – Conway, Sumter	East end of US 378 overlap
Sumter	Mayesville	222.3	357.8		SC 154 north (Lafayette Street) – St. Charles	
Lee		225.0	362.1		SC 527 (Elliott Highway) – Elliott, Kingstree	
Lee	Lynchburg	231.9	373.2		SC 341 (Lynchburg Highway) – Bishopville, Lake City	
Florence		239.6	385.6		SC 403 south (Cale Yarborough Highway) – Sardis	South end of SC 403 overlap
Florence	Timmonsville	241.1	388.0		SC 403 north (Brockington Street) – Hartsville	North end of SC 403 overlap
Florence	Florence	245.2	394.6		I-95 – Savannah, Fayetteville	
Florence	Florence	249.2	401.0		SC 51 south (2nd Loop Road) – Pamplico	
Florence	Florence	249.5	401.5		David H. McLeod Boulevard west (US 76 Conn. west) to I-20 BS / I-20 / I-95 north – Columbia	Eastern terminus of US 76 Conn.
Florence	Florence				South Coit Street (US 52 Conn. north)	Western end of US 52 Conn. concurrency
Florence	Florence	251.9	405.4		US 52 (South Irby Street) to I-95 – Charleston, Darlington, Downtown, County complex, Judicial center, McLeod Medical Center, Carolina Hospital	Eastern end of US 52 Conn. concurrency; southern terminus of US 52 Conn.
Florence	Florence				US 52 Truck (South Church Street)	
Florence		256.7	413.1		US 301 south (Freedom Boulevard) / SC 327 north (Williston Road) to I-20 / I-95	South end of US 301 and north end of SC 327 overlap
Florence	Mars Bluff	258.4	415.9		SC 327 (Francis Marion Road) – Pamplico	South end of SC 327 overlap
Marion	Pee Dee	265.6	427.4		US 301 north – Dillon	North end of US 301 overlap; eastbound left exit and westbound entrance
Marion	West Marion	272.1	437.9		SC 576 south to US 501 – Conway, Myrtle Beach, North Myrtle Beach	
Marion	Marion	273.6	440.3		US 501 Bus. / SC 41 Alt. (Main Street) – Conway, Dillon	
Marion	Marion	277.0	445.8		US 501 – Conway, Dillon	Interchange
Marion					I-73	Proposed interchange
Marion	Mullins	282.5	454.6		SC 41 / SC 917 (Main Street) – Loris, Dillon	
Marion	Nichols	289.7	466.2		SC 9 north (Main Street) – Lake View, Dillon	North end of SC 9 overlap
Horry		291.4	469.0		SC 9 south – North Myrtle Beach, Myrtle Beach	South end of SC 9 overlap
Horry		297.9	479.4		US 76 east – Fair Bluff, Wilmington	Continuation into North Carolina
1.000 mi = 1.609 km; 1.000 km = 0.621 mi: Concurrency terminus; Incomplete access; Unopened

== See also ==
- Special routes of U.S. Route 76
- The South Carolina National Heritage Corridor: plantations to mill villages - The South Carolina National Heritage Corridor: plantations to mill villages - South Caroliniana Library Map Collection - UofSC Digital Collections
- SC National Heritage Corridor | Belton Alliance

U.S. Route 76
Previous state: Georgia	South Carolina	Next state: North Carolina
