= South Carolina Highway 66 =

State highway in South Carolina

South Carolina Highway 66

Route information
- Maintained by SCDOT
- Length: 18.550 mi (29.853 km)
- Existed: 1934–present

Major junctions
- West end: SC 56 near Joanna
- US 76 in Joanna; I-26 in Bonds Crossroads
- East end: SC 72 in Whitmire

Location
- Country: United States
- State: South Carolina
- Counties: Laurens, Newberry

Highway system
- South Carolina State Highway System; Interstate; US; State; Scenic
← SC 65	→ SC 67

South Carolina Highway 66 (SC 66) is a 18.550-mile (29.853 km) primary state highway in the state of South Carolina. It serves to connect the community of Joanna with nearby SC 56 and the town of Whitmire.

== Route description ==
SC 66 is a two-lane rural highway that travels 17.6 miles (28.3 km) from SC 56 to SC 72 in Whitmire. It connects to U.S. Route 76 (US 76) and Interstate 26 (I-26). Predominantly in the Sumter National Forest, it meanders through forest lands; in Whitmire, it takes a couple of turns before reaching SC 72 via Central Avenue, Park Street and Glenn Street.

== History ==
SC 66 was established in 1934 as a new primary routing, traversing from SC 56 to US 76/SC 2 in Goldville (now Joanna). In 1941 or 1942, a second SC 66 was created, from SC 706 in Eisons Crossroads to the Newberry-Laurens county line. In 1948, the two sections of SC 66 were connected, and was also extended east into Whitmire replacing part of SC 706.

=== South Carolina Highway 706 ===
South Carolina Highway 706
- Location: Jalapa-Whitmire, SC
- Length: 13.5 mi (21.7 km)
- Existed: 1940–1948

South Carolina Highway 706 (SC 706) was established in 1940 as a new primary routing from US 76/SC 2 in Jalapa to SC 7 in Whitmire. In 1948, SC 706 was decommissioned with its routing north of Eisons Crossroads becoming part of SC 66, while south of it was downgraded to secondary Jalapa Road (S-36-32).

== Junction list ==
County	Location	mi	km	Destinations	Notes
Laurens		0.000	0.000	SC 56 – Chappells, Saluda, Clinton	Western terminus
Laurens		0.180	0.290	SC 66 Conn. west	Eastern terminus of SC 66 Conn.
Laurens	Joanna	2.730	4.394	US 76 (Main Street) – Newberry, Clinton	
Laurens	Bonds Crossroads	6.418– 6.420	10.329– 10.332	I-26 – Columbia, Spartanburg	I-26 exit 60
Newberry–Laurens county line	No major junctions				
Newberry	Whitmire	18.550	29.853	SC 72 (Church Street) – Chester, Clinton	Eastern terminus
1.000 mi = 1.609 km; 1.000 km = 0.621 mi

== Joanna connector route ==
South Carolina Highway 66 Connector
- Location: Joanna, South Carolina
- Length: 0.180 mi (290 m)

South Carolina Highway 66 Connector (SC 66 Conn.) is a connector route of SC 66 that exists southwest of Joanna. It connects SC 56 with SC 66 just northeast of the latter highway's western terminus. It is unnamed and is an unsigned highway.
