= Interstate 26 in South Carolina =

Section of Interstate Highway in South Carolina, United States

Interstate 26
- James F. Byrnes Memorial Freeway
- I-26 highlighted in red

Route information
- Maintained by SCDOT
- Length: 220.95 mi (355.58 km)
- Existed: 1960–present
- Tourist routes: South Carolina Heritage Corridor: Nature Route
- NHS: Entire route

Major junctions
- West end: I-26 at the North Carolina line near Landrum
- I-85 in Southern Shops; I-385 in Clinton; I-20 near Columbia; I-126 / US 76 in Columbia; I-77 in Cayce; I-95 near Holly Hill; I-526 in North Charleston
- East end: US 17 in Charleston

Location
- Country: United States
- State: South Carolina
- Counties: Spartanburg, Laurens, Newberry, Lexington, Richland, Calhoun, Orangeburg, Dorchester, Berkeley, Charleston

Highway system
- Interstate Highway System; Main; Auxiliary; Suffixed; Business; Future; South Carolina State Highway System; Interstate; US; State; Scenic

Interstate 26 (I-26) is a South Carolina Interstate highway running generally east–west from near Landrum, in Spartanburg County, to U.S. Route 17 (US 17), in Charleston, South Carolina. It is also the longest Interstate Highway in South Carolina.

== Route description ==
I-26 runs 221 miles (356 km) through South Carolina. Milemarkers run from west (north) to east (south). Milemarker 0 is in the mountains at the North Carolina state line. The last exit, at US 17 south of Charleston, is exit 221.

I-26 runs between the Broad and Saluda Rivers, descending from the mountains to the piedmont or midlands. At Columbia, I-126 crosses the confluence of the Broad and Saluda, which together form the Congaree, near the Columbia Canal and water treatment plant. I-26 continues following the Congaree until it hops south over into the Cooper and Ashley Drainage, then down to the coast.

I-26 is predominantly a four-lane rural Interstate with 70-mile-per-hour (110 km/h) speed limits. In the Columbia and Charleston areas, the Interstate widens to six lanes, but speeds are lower.

I-26 enters South Carolina just northeast of Landrum, traveling a southeasterly direction. The first major city along its route is Spartanburg, where it intersects I-85 to Greenville and Charlotte. As the Interstate weaves along the terrain, it reaches Clinton; where westbound travelers can connect with I-385 toward Greenville. Traveling through the Sumter National Forest, it connects with Newberry before entering the Midlands. At Columbia in a section known as "Malfunction Junction", it connects with I-20 to Augusta and Florence and I-126 toward the downtown area; it then goes south over the Saluda River and into Lexington County for the second of eventually four times along its course. At Cayce, it connects with I-77 to Charlotte. South of Cayce, the Interstate goes up and down a few very long hills before reaching the outskirts of Orangeburg and I-95 to Savannah and Florence. As it enters the relatively flat plains of the Lowcountry, the area becomes urbanized as the Interstate encroaches upon North Charleston and Charleston. As the Interstate curves through the peninsula formed by the Ashley and Cooper rivers, it connects with I-526 to Savannah and Mount Pleasant. Near the end, it overlaps with US 17 from its new interchange (from the Arthur Ravenel Jr. Bridge) to where the old interchange remnants and where I-26 ends (formally where the John P. Grace Memorial Bridge and Silas N. Pearman Bridge connected).

=== Services ===
The South Carolina Department of Transportation (SCDOT) operates and maintains one welcome center and seven rest areas along I-26. Welcome centers, which have a travel information facility on site, are located at milemarker 3 (eastbound); rest areas are located at milemarkers 63 (east and westbound), 123 (east and westbound), 150 (eastbound), 152 (westbound), and 204 (eastbound). Common at all locations are public restrooms, public telephones, vending machines, picnic area, and barbecue grills.

The South Carolina Department of Public Safety (SCDPS) and State Transport Police (STP) operates and maintains three truck inspection/weigh stations. A westbound weigh station can be found at milemarker 93.5 in Chapin 17 miles (27 km) west of Columbia, and two others at milemarker 173 (eastbound) and milemarker 174 (westbound) in Harleyville east of the interchanges with I-95 and US 15.

== History ==
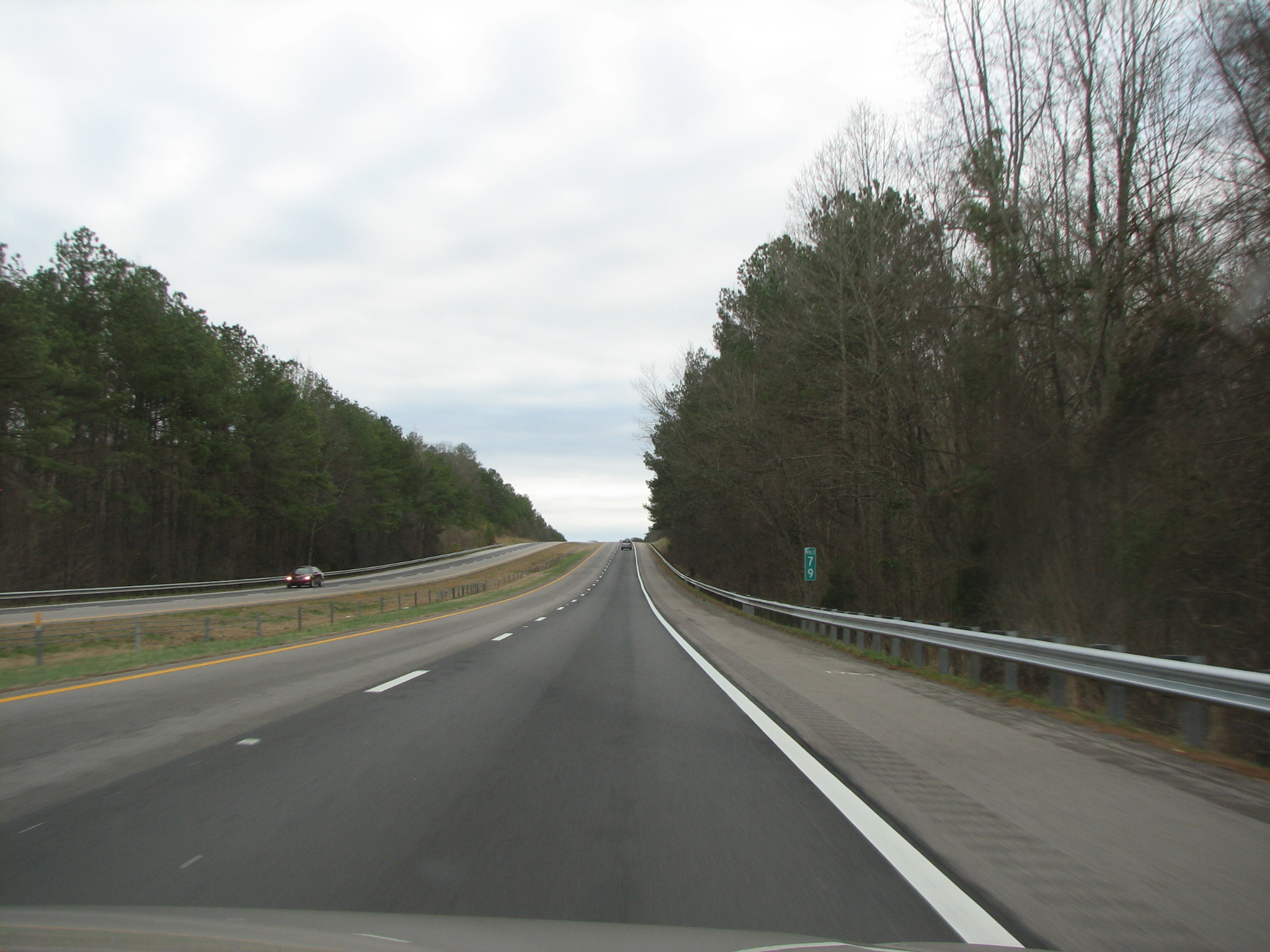
East I-26 in South Carolina at milemarker 79, between Newberry and Prosperity.

Construction of I-26 began in 1957 in the Columbia area with the nine-mile (14 km) section from the Broad River to near Irmo. The 11-mile (18 km) section of I-26 from I-126/US 76 in Columbia to US 176 at exit 97 was the first section of the highway to open up to traffic (on September 7, 1960). The six-mile (9.7 km) section from South Carolina Highway 210 (SC 210) to US 15 opened in September 1962. Construction proceeded in stages heading both west up toward Greenville and east toward Charleston. The highway was largely completed from Columbia to North Charleston by 1964; the section from Aviation Avenue to the highway's terminus at US 17 in downtown Charleston progressed more slowly due to land takings for the right-of-way and numerous bridges and viaducts that had to be built. The entire 221 miles (356 km) of I-26 were completed by February 1969.

In the 1980s–1990s, I-26 around Columbia was widened from four to six lanes. In the mid-1990s, the North Charleston area was also widened from four to six lanes, part of which was further widened to eight lanes in the early 2010s. In 2005, the US 17 was realigned to a new interchange with I-26 at exit 220 from exit 221; the old interchange was mostly torn down and reconfigured, leaving the I-26 viaduct eastbound offramp and westbound onramps with US 17 south. In the mid-2010s, I-26 was widened southeast of Columbia from I-77 to Old Sandy Run Road. Starting in 2019 or 2020, a long stretch of I-26 northwest of Columbia will begin widening construction from four to six lanes from SC 202 at Little Mountain to US 76/US 176 at Irmo.

In 2011, a plan to add a lane in each direction between Broad River Road and Saint Andrews Road through "Malfunction Junction" had $8.5 million (equivalent to $12.17 million in 2025) in funding but was expected to start sometime after 2012 and take two years.

On October 5, 2016, I-26 had all lanes converted to westbound only, from I-77 to I-526, due to Hurricane Matthew. This was done again on September 11, 2018, due to Hurricane Florence, and in September 2019 for Hurricane Dorian.

On November 19, 2016, construction began in Charleston to demolish, reconfigure, and replace exits 217 and 218, related to a new access road to the Hugh K. Leatherman Sr. Terminal; the interchange was opened on February 23, 2021.

On October 18, 2018, SCDOT approved widening I-26 between Columbia and Charleston. SCDOT plans to widen I-26 from Old Sandy Run Road in Calhoun County to Ridgeville Road (SC 27) in Berkeley County. Work on the road widening project officially began in October 2022.

On July 6, 2023, a tractor trailer pulling an excavator hit a bridge carrying Bachman Chapel Road over I-26 in Newberry when it was too tall to clear it. The bridge was deemed to be so damaged that it was closed indefinitely. The driver of the truck did not stop.

== Future ==
SCDOT is currently working on several projects to improve I-26 along its entire route in South Carolina. In Columbia, work has begun on the "Carolina Crossroads" project to redo improve the Interstate corridors in the city. These improvements are being made increase mobility and enhance traffic operations by reducing existing traffic congestion within the I-20/I-26/I-126 corridor, while accommodating future traffic needs. The corridor's approximately 16 miles (26 km) of mainline Interstate include I-26 from exit 101 (Broad River Road/US 176) to east of the Saluda River, I-20 from the west of the Saluda River to west of the Broad River, and I-126 from I-26 to east of the interchange with Colonial Life Boulevard. A $62.1 million project to convert the US 21 interchange south of Columbia from a partial cloverleaf interchange to a diamond interchange started in May 2023 and is expected to be completed in 2026. Another project to redo exit 91 will be fully opened on July 12, 2023. Long-term plans call for much of I-26 to be widened from four to six lanes between Columbia and Charleston. The project is expected to cost $2 billion and will also include rebuilding bridges and reconfiguring interchanges, including I-95 interchange near Holly Hill. Bidding for at least a part of the 70-mile-long (110 km) project is expected to begin by the end of 2023 with construction tentatively scheduled to start in the middle of 2024.

== Auxiliary routes ==
I-26 in South Carolina has two extant and one former auxiliary route. I-126 in Columbia and I-526 in Charleston are spur routes in their respective cities. I-326 was an unsigned designation that was decommissioned and is now part of I-77 in Columbia.

== Exit list ==
County	Location	mi	km	Exit	Destinations	Notes
Spartanburg		0.0	0.0		I-26 west – Hendersonville, Asheville	Continuation into North Carolina
Spartanburg	Landrum	0.9	1.4	1	SC 14 east – Landrum	
Spartanburg		5.3	8.5	5	SC 11 (Cherokee Foothills Scenic Highway) – Campobello, Chesnee	
Spartanburg		10.0	16.1	10	SC 292 – Inman	
Spartanburg		14.0	22.5	15	US 176 – Inman, Spartanburg	
Spartanburg		15.4	24.8	16	John Dodd Road – Wellford	
Spartanburg	Southern Shops	16.7	26.9	17	New Cut Road	
Spartanburg	Southern Shops	17.8	28.6	18	I-85 – Greenville, Charlotte	Signed as exits 18A (south) and 18B (north)
Spartanburg	Southern Shops	18.6	29.9	19	I-85 BL (Veterans Parkway) – Greenville, Spartanburg	Signed as exits 19A (south) and 19B (north)
Spartanburg	Spartanburg	21.0	33.8	21	US 29 – Greer, Spartanburg	Signed as exits 21A (south) and 21B (north); to Westgate Mall
Spartanburg	Spartanburg	22.0	35.4	22	SC 296 (Reidville Road) – Spartanburg, Reidville	
Spartanburg	Moore	28.1	45.2	28	US 221 – Spartanburg, Moore, Woodruff	
Spartanburg		34.5	55.5	35	Walnut Grove Road – Woodruff	
Spartanburg		38.0	61.2	38	SC 146 – Cross Anchor, Woodruff	
Spartanburg		40.6	65.3	41	SC 92 – Enoree, Cross Anchor	
Spartanburg		44.1	71.0	44	SC 49 – Laurens, Cross Anchor, Union	
Laurens	Clinton	51.8	83.4	51	I-385 north – Laurens, Greenville	Westbound exit and eastbound entrance
Laurens	Clinton	52.5	84.5	52	SC 56 – Clinton, Cross Anchor	
Laurens	Clinton	53.6	86.3	54	SC 72 – Clinton, Whitmire	
Laurens		59.7	96.1	60	SC 66 (Whitmire Highway) – Joanna, Whitmire	
Newberry		66.2	106.5	66	Jalapa Road– Jalapa	Formerly Road 32
Newberry		71.5	115.1	72	SC 121 – Newberry, Whitmire, Union	
Newberry	Newberry	74.0	119.1	74	SC 34 – Newberry, Winnsboro	
Newberry	Newberry	76.0	122.3	76	SC 219 – Newberry, Pomaria	
Newberry		82.2	132.3	82	SC 773 – Prosperity, Pomaria	
Newberry		85.2	137.1	85	SC 202 – Pomaria, Little Mountain	
Lexington	Chapin	91.2	146.8	91	Columbia Avenue – Chapin	
Richland		96.5	155.3	97	US 176 – Ballentine, White Rock, Peak	
Richland	Irmo	101.4	163.2	101	US 76 west / US 176 (Broad River Road) – Ballentine, White Rock	Western end of US 76 overlap; signed as exits 101A (west) and 101B (east)
Richland	Irmo	102.2	164.5	102	SC 60 (Lake Murray Boulevard) – Lake Murray, Irmo	Signed as exits 102A (west) and 102B (east)
Richland	Columbia	103.4	166.4	103	Harbison Boulevard	To Columbiana Centre
Lexington	Seven Oaks	104.3	167.9	104	Piney Grove Road	
Lexington	Seven Oaks	106.4	171.2	106	St. Andrews Road	Signed as exits 106A (west) and 106B (east) westbound
Richland	St. Andrews	107.1	172.4	107	I-20 – Augusta, Florence	Signed as exits 107A (west) and 107B (east); I-20 exit 64
Richland	Columbia	107.6	173.2	108A	Bush River Road	Permanently closed as of October 1, 2024; new access via I-126’s Colonial Life Boulevard interchange
Richland	Columbia	107.8	173.5	108	I-126 east / US 76 east / Colonial Life Boulevard to Bush River Road – Downtown Columbia	Western terminus of I-126; eastern end of US 76 overlap; signed as exits 108A (Colonial Life Boulevard) and 108B (I-126 east/US 76 east); no exit number signed for I-126/US 76 on eastbound
Lexington	West Columbia	109.7	176.5	110	US 378 – Lexington, West Columbia	
Lexington	West Columbia	111.3	179.1	111	US 1 to SC 12 – Lexington, West Columbia	Signed as exits 111A (south) and 111B (north)
Lexington	Cayce	113.2	182.2	113	SC 302 – Columbia Airport, Cayce	
Lexington	Cayce	115.1	185.2	115	US 21 / US 176 / US 321 – Gaston, Cayce	
Lexington	Cayce	115.6	186.0	116	I-77 north – Charlotte	Southern terminus of I-77
Lexington		119.5	192.3	119	US 21 / US 176 – St. Matthews, Dixiana	
Calhoun		124.6	200.5	125	Old Sandy Run Road – Gaston	
Lexington		128.7	207.1	129	US 21	
Calhoun		136.3	219.4	136	SC 6 – North, St. Matthews, Swansea	
Calhoun		139.3	224.2	139	Burke Road – St. Matthews	
Orangeburg		145.3	233.8	145	US 601 – Orangeburg, St. Matthews	
Orangeburg		148.5	239.0	149	SC 33 – Orangeburg, Cameron	To SC State University and Claflin University
Orangeburg		154.2	248.2	154	US 301 – Orangeburg, Santee	Signed as exits 154A (south) and 154B (north)
Orangeburg		159.0	255.9	159	Homestead Road – Bowman	
Orangeburg		164.7	265.1	165	SC 210 – Bowman, Vance	
Orangeburg		168.5	271.2	169	I-95 – Savannah, Florence	Signed as exits 169A (south) and 169B (north)
Dorchester		171.5	276.0	172	US 15 – St. George, Santee, Holly Hill	Signed as exits 172A (south) and 172B (north)
Dorchester		177.0	284.9	177	SC 453 – Harleyville, Holly Hill	
Dorchester		187.4	301.6	187	SC 27 – Ridgeville, St. George	
Berkeley		189.2	304.5	189	Volvo Car Drive	To Geely manufacturing plant
Berkeley		194.4	312.9	194	Jedburg Road – Jedburg, Pinopolis	Signed as exits 194A (south) and 194B (north) westbound; formerly Road 16
Berkeley	Summerville	197.5	317.8	197	Nexton Parkway	Signed as exits 197A (south) and 197B (north) westbound
Berkeley	Summerville	199.0	320.3	199	US 17 Alt. – Summerville, Moncks Corner	Signed as exits 199A (south) and 199B (north)
Berkeley	Ladson	203.2	327.0	203	College Park Road – Ladson	
Charleston	North Charleston	205.0	329.9	205	US 78 to US 52 – Goose Creek, Ladson	Signed as exits 205A (west) and 205B (east); to Charleston Southern University
Charleston	North Charleston	206.0	331.5	206	Weber Boulevard	Opened on November 17, 2025
Charleston	North Charleston	208.1	334.9	209A	US 52 Conn. north to US 52 / US 78 – Goose Creek, Moncks Corner	Westbound exit and eastbound entrance; southern terminus of US 52 Conn.
Charleston	North Charleston	208.6	335.7	209B	Ashley Phosphate Road	Signed as exit 209 eastbound; to Northwoods Mall
Charleston	North Charleston	211.1	339.7	211A	Aviation Avenue – Charleston AFB	
Charleston	North Charleston	211.6	340.5	211B	Remount Road – Hanahan	Formerly exit 211 before 2012; exits connected in both directions via collector-distributor lanes
Charleston	North Charleston	212.6	342.1	212	I-526 – Savannah, Mount Pleasant	Signed as exits 212B (west) and 212C (east)
Charleston	North Charleston	213.5	343.6	213	Montague Avenue / Tanger Outlet Boulevard / Mall Drive	Signed as exits 213A (Montague Avenue west, Tanger Outlet Boulevard) and 213B (Montague Avenue east) eastbound; eastbound exit only to Tanger Outlet Boulevard, westbound exit and entrance only to Mall Drive
Charleston	North Charleston	215.5	346.8	215	SC 642 (Dorchester Road)	
Charleston	North Charleston	216.3	348.1	216	SC 7 (Cosgrove Avenue) – Federal Complex	Signed as exits 216A (south) and 216B (north)
Charleston	Charleston	217.3	349.7	217	US 52 (North Meeting Street) / Port Access Road / Bainbridge Avenue	To Hugh K. Leatherman Sr. Terminal. Signed as 217/218 eastbound, 218 westbound
Charleston	Charleston	219.0	352.4	219A	Rutledge Avenue – The Citadel	Eastbound exit and westbound entrance
Charleston	Charleston	219.3	352.9	219B	Morrison Drive / East Bay Street (US 52 Spur)	Eastbound exit and westbound entrance
Charleston	Charleston	220.2	354.4	220A	Romney Street	Westbound exit only
Charleston	Charleston	220.3	354.5	220B	US 17 north – Mount Pleasant, Georgetown	Western end of US 17 overlap; signed as exit 220 eastbound; no eastbound entrance
Charleston	Charleston	220.4	354.7	221B	Meeting Street – Visitor Center, Downtown	Eastbound left exit only
Charleston	Charleston	220.7	355.2	—	King Street (US 78)	Eastbound left exit only
Charleston	Charleston	220.7	355.2	221A	US 17 south – Savannah	Eastern end of US 17 overlap; continuation beyond eastern terminus
1.000 mi = 1.609 km; 1.000 km = 0.621 mi: Closed/former; Concurrency terminus; Incomplete access

== See also ==
- Ashley River
- Enoree River
- Lake Murray
- Saluda River
- Sumter National Forest

Interstate 26
Previous state: North Carolina	South Carolina	Next state: Terminus
