= South Carolina Highway 308 =

State highway in South Carolina, United States

South Carolina Highway 308

Route information
- Maintained by SCDOT
- Length: 10.990 mi (17.687 km)
- Existed: 1949–present

Major junctions
- West end: US 221 in Ora
- I-385 near Clinton
- East end: SC 56 Bus. / SC 72 Bus. in Clinton

Location
- Country: United States
- State: South Carolina
- Counties: Laurens

Highway system
- South Carolina State Highway System; Interstate; US; State; Scenic
← SC 304	→ SC 310

South Carolina Highway 308 (SC 308) is a 10.990-mile-long (17.687 km) state highway in the U.S. state of South Carolina. The highway connects Ora and Clinton.

== Route description ==
SC 308 begins at an intersection with U.S. Route 221 in Ora, Laurens County. It travels to the southeast and curves to the northeast. Then, it heads to the east and intersects SC 49. It crosses Duncan Creek, which leads into Clinton Reservoir. The highway passes Clinton Reservoir Tract Wildlife Management Area. After that, it crosses over Long Branch before an interchange with Interstate 385 (I-385; Veterans Memorial Highway). SC 308 crosses over Beards Fork Creek before entering Clinton. There, it meets its eastern terminus, an intersection with SC 56 Business (SC 56 Bus.) and SC 72 Bus. (North Broad Street/Willard Road).

== Major intersections ==
The entire route is in Laurens County.

Location	mi	km	Destinations	Notes
Ora	0.000	0.000	US 221 – Laurens, Woodruff	Western terminus
	3.790	6.099	SC 49 – Laurens, Cross Anchor	
	8.020– 8.031	12.907– 12.925	I-385 (Veterans Memorial Highway) – Columbia, Greenville	I-385 exit 2
Clinton	10.990	17.687	SC 56 Bus. / SC 72 Bus. (Broad Street / Willard Road)	Eastern terminus
1.000 mi = 1.609 km; 1.000 km = 0.621 mi
