= South Carolina Highway 92 =

State highway in South Carolina, United States

South Carolina Highway 92

Route information
- Maintained by SCDOT
- Length: 16.460 mi (26.490 km)

Major junctions
- West end: SC 101 in Gray Court
- US 221 in Enoree; I-26 near Enoree
- East end: SC 49 near Cross Anchor

Location
- Country: United States
- State: South Carolina
- Counties: Laurens, Spartanburg

Highway system
- South Carolina State Highway System; Interstate; US; State; Scenic
← SC 91	→ SC 93

South Carolina Highway 92 (SC 92) is a 16.46-mile-long (26.49 km) state highway in the U.S. state of South Carolina. The highway connects Gray Court with the Enoree area.

== Route description ==
SC 92 begins at an intersection with SC 101 (East Mill Street) in Gray Court within Laurens County. It travels to the northeast and crosses over but does not have an interchange with Interstate 385 (I-385). The highway travels through rural areas of the county and has an intersection with U.S. Route 221 (US 221). The two highways travel concurrently to the north-northeast. They cross over the Enoree River, enter Spartanburg County, and enter Enoree, where SC 92 splits off to the east. A short distance later is an interchange with I-26. It immediately curves to the south-southeast and parallels I-26 until just before meeting its eastern terminus, an intersection with SC 49 (Union Highway).

== Major intersections ==
County	Location	mi	km	Destinations	Notes
Laurens	Gray Court	0.000	0.000	SC 101 (East Mill Street) – Woodruff	Western terminus
Laurens		8.990	14.468	US 221 south – Laurens	Western end of US 221 concurrency
Spartanburg	Enoree	10.440	16.802	US 221 north – Woodruff	Eastern end of US 221 concurrency
Spartanburg	Enoree	10.460	16.834	SC 92 Conn. north to US 221 north – Woodruff	SC 92 Conn. is northbound only; southern terminus of SC 92 Conn.
Spartanburg		12.800– 12.810	20.600– 20.616	I-26 – Spartanburg, Columbia	I-26 exit 41
Spartanburg		16.460	26.490	SC 49 (Union Highway) to I-26 – Laurens	Eastern terminus
1.000 mi = 1.609 km; 1.000 km = 0.621 mi: Concurrency terminus; Incomplete access

== Enoree connector route ==
South Carolina Highway 92 Connector
- Location: Enoree, South Carolina
- Length: 0.060 mi (97 m)

South Carolina Highway 92 Connector (SC 92 Conn.) is a 0.060-mile (0.097 km) connector route that connects SC 92 with U.S. Route 221 (US 221) northbound in the southern part of Enoree. It is a northbound-only street.
