= South Carolina Highway 773 =

State highway in South Carolina, United States

South Carolina Highway 773

Route information
- Maintained by SCDOT
- Length: 5.490 mi (8.835 km)

Major junctions
- South end: US 76 near Prosperity
- I-26 near Pomaria
- North end: US 176 in Pomaria

Location
- Country: United States
- State: South Carolina
- Counties: Newberry

Highway system
- South Carolina State Highway System; Interstate; US; State; Scenic
← SC 769	→ SC 781

South Carolina Highway 773 (SC 773) is a 5.490-mile (8.835 km) state highway in the U.S. state of South Carolina. The highway connects rural areas of Newberry County with Pomaria.

== Route description ==
SC 773 begins at an intersection with U.S. Route 76 (US 76) at a point east-northeast of Prosperity, Newberry County, where the roadway continues as a local road. This intersection is northwest of Mid-Carolina Middle School and Mid-Carolina High School. It travels to the northeast and crosses over various sets of railroad tracks. It travels along the western edge of the Mid Carolina Club golf course just before an interchange with Interstate 26 (I-26). SC 773 passes St. Paul's Cemetery before entering Pomaria. There, it meets its northern terminus, an intersection with US 176.

== Major intersections ==
The entire route is in Newberry County.

Location	mi	km	Destinations	Notes
	0.000	0.000	US 76 – Prosperity, Little Mountain	Southern terminus
	2.084– 2.100	3.354– 3.380	I-26 – Columbia, Spartanburg	I-26 exit 82
Pomaria	5.490	8.835	US 176 – Whitmire	Northern terminus
1.000 mi = 1.609 km; 1.000 km = 0.621 mi
