= South Carolina Highway 560 =

State highway in South Carolina, United States

South Carolina Highway 560

Route information
- Maintained by SCDOT
- Length: 14.200 mi (22.853 km)

Major junctions
- West end: SC 39 in Cross Hill
- SC 56 near Kinards
- East end: US 76 in Kinards

Location
- Country: United States
- State: South Carolina
- Counties: Laurens

Highway system
- South Carolina State Highway System; Interstate; US; State; Scenic
← SC 557	→ SC 576

South Carolina Highway 560 (SC 560) is a 14.200-mile (22.853 km) state highway in the U.S. state of South Carolina. The highway connects Cross Hill and Kinards.

== Route description ==
SC 560 begins at an intersection with SC 39 (Main Street) in Cross Hill, within Laurens County. It enters White Plains Crossroad and travels to the east and northeast before it crosses North Campbell Creek. It crosses over Mill Creek and then curves to the east. It crosses over Watkins Creek and curves to the southeast. The highway crosses over the Little River and enters the Belfast Wildlife Management Area. It stays in that area for approximately 4,000 feet (1,200 m), when it intersects SC 56. Approximately 700 feet (210 m) later, it begins traveling along the Newberry County line, along which it travels for the rest of its length. SC 560 crosses over Quaker Creek, Garrison Creek, Workman Branch, and Bush River before it enters Kinards. There, it crosses over some railroad tracks and meets its eastern terminus, an intersection with U.S. Route 76 (US 76). Here, the highway continues as County Line Road and immediately enters Sumter National Forest.

== Major intersections ==
County	Location	mi	km	Destinations	Notes
Laurens	Cross Hill	0.000	0.000	SC 39 (Main Street) – Chappells, Saluda, Augusta	Western terminus
Laurens		8.300	13.358	SC 56 – Walhalla	
Laurens–Newberry county line	Kinards	14.200	22.853	US 76 – Fair Play	Eastern terminus
1.000 mi = 1.609 km; 1.000 km = 0.621 mi
