= South Carolina Highway 202 =

State highway in South Carolina, United States

South Carolina Highway 202

Route information
- Maintained by SCDOT
- Length: 4.520 mi (7.274 km)

Major junctions
- West end: US 76 in Little Mountain
- I-26 near Little Mountain
- East end: US 176 near Pomaria

Location
- Country: United States
- State: South Carolina
- Counties: Newberry

Highway system
- South Carolina State Highway System; Interstate; US; State; Scenic
← SC 201	→ SC 203

South Carolina Highway 202 (SC 202) is a 4.520-mile-long (7.274 km) state highway in the U.S. state of South Carolina. The highway connects Little Mountain and the Pomaria area. Though signed as an east-west highway, it runs in a south-to-north fashion.

== Route description ==
SC 202 begins at an intersection with U.S. Route 76 (US 76; Main Street) in Little Mountain, within Newberry, where the roadway continues as a local road in downtown Little Mountain. It travels to the north-northwest and leaves the city limits. The highway immediately curves to the north-northeast and has an interchange with Interstate 26 (I-26). It curves to the north and crosses over Rocky Creek. After one final north-northwest segment, the highway curves to the northeast and meets its western terminus, an intersection with US 176, at a point southeast of Pomaria.

== Major intersections ==
The entire route is in Newberry County.

Location	mi	km	Destinations	Notes
Little Mountain	0.000	0.000	US 76 (Main Street) – Prosperity, Chapin	Western terminus
	1.769– 1.780	2.847– 2.865	I-26 – Columbia, Spartanburg	I-26 exit 85
	4.520	7.274	US 176 – Pomaria, Whitmire, Columbia	Eastern terminus
1.000 mi = 1.609 km; 1.000 km = 0.621 mi
