= South Carolina Highway 219 =

State highway in South Carolina, United States

South Carolina Highway 219

Route information
- Maintained by SCDOT
- Length: 9.030 mi (14.532 km)
- Existed: 1937–present

Major junctions
- West end: US 76 / SC 34 in Newberry
- I-26 near Newberry
- East end: US 176 north of Pomaria

Location
- Country: United States
- State: South Carolina
- Counties: Newberry

Highway system
- South Carolina State Highway System; Interstate; US; State; Scenic
← SC 217	→ US 221

South Carolina Highway 219 (SC 219) is a 9.030-mile-long (14.532 km) highway in the U.S. state of South Carolina. The highway is designated on an east–west direction, from SC 34 in Newberry to U.S. Route 176 (US 176).

== Major intersections ==
The entire route is in Newberry County.

Location	mi	km	Destinations	Notes
Newberry	0.000	0.000	US 76 / SC 34 (Wilson Road) / Main Street – Prosperity, Clinton	Western terminus
	3.120	5.021	I-26 – Columbia, Spartanburg	I-26 exit 76
	9.030	14.532	US 176 – Whitmire, Peak	Eastern terminus
1.000 mi = 1.609 km; 1.000 km = 0.621 mi
