= U.S. Route 221 in South Carolina =

Segment of American highway

U.S. Highway 221
- US 221 highlighted in red

Route information
- Auxiliary route of US 21
- Maintained by SCDOT
- Length: 126.390 mi (203.405 km)
- Existed: 1932–present
- Tourist routes: South Carolina Heritage Corridor: Nature Route; Overmountain Victory Commemorative Motor Route; Savannah River Scenic Byway

Major junctions
- South end: US 221 / SR 150 at the Georgia state line near Clarks Hill
- US 25 / US 178 / SC 72 in Greenwood; US 76 / US 221 Truck in Laurens; I-385 near Watts Mills; I-26 in Roebuck; US 29 in Spartanburg; I-585 / US 176 / SC 9 in Spartanburg; I-85 near Spartanburg
- North end: US 221 at the North Carolina state line near Chesnee

Location
- Country: United States
- State: South Carolina
- Counties: McCormick, Greenwood, Laurens, Spartanburg, Cherokee

Highway system
- United States Numbered Highway System; List; Special; Divided; South Carolina State Highway System; Interstate; US; State; Scenic
← SC 219	→ SC 223

In the U.S. state of South Carolina, U.S. Route 221 (US 221) is a 126.390-mile (203.405 km) United States Highway within the state. It is part of the United States Numbered Highway System that travels from Perry in North Florida to Lynchburg in Central Virginia. While in South Carolina, the highway travels through Greenwood, Laurens, Woodruff, and Spartanburg. The highway mostly travels through rural parts of the Piedmont region of the state.

== Route description ==
US Route 221 enters McCormick County from Georgia from the top of the J. Strom Thurmond Dam at the southeastern edge of Lake Strom Thurmond. The first site in the state is the Thurmond Lake Overlook. Almost instantly curves to the north but then to the east before seeming to terminate at South Carolina State Highway 28 in Clarks Hill, South Carolina (which is part of the Savannah River Scenic Byway), but in reality turns left and joins the road in a concurrency. US 221/SC 28 runs north and northwesterly often being flanked by a railroad line along the east side as it passes through Modoc where it encounters the Hamilton Branch State Park and Recreation Area, and later Parksville which contains the Parksville State Recreation Area. The road widens to four lanes as it enters Plum Branch and after a road to the Plum Branch Yacht Club, has a blinker light intersection with the western terminus of South Carolina Highway 283 and a local road named Collier Street.

Shifting a bit further away from the coast it eventually enters the town of McCormick. From McCormick, it leaves SC 28, and briefly joins a concurrency with U.S. Route 378 until that route breaks away at East Gold Street. From there it continues northeasterly into the woods. After crossing the McCormick-Greenwood County Line, US 221 joins a concurrency with South Carolina Highway 10 south of Bradley. Along the way, US 221/SC 10 runs along the south side of the same railroad line it flanked the west side of since the SC 28 concurrency. After the intersection with Callison Road, and later two other local streets, SC 10 branches off to the northwest towards Verdery, and US 221 leaves the Sumter National Forest. Twelve miles later, it runs into the city of Greenwood. Along the way it is joined by another concurrency with U.S. Routes 25/178, and runs south and east along the edge of the city, then turns east onto South Carolina Highway 72.

From Greenwood, U.S. Route 221 continues northeasterly to the city of Coronaca and after crossing a bridge over the Saluda River the concurrency with SC 72 comes to an end. From there US 221 turns north and runs through Waterloo. U.S. Truck Route 221 bypasses the city of Laurens on the east side. After the truck route ends, it continues northeast and then northwest before the interchange with Interstate 385 in rural Laurens County. Returning more toward the northeast, it reaches Enoree and curves to the northwest until reaching Woodruff and curves back to the east-northeast proceeding to intersect Interstate 26 in rural Spartanburg County. Almost immediately after I-26, U.S. Route 221 turns north and continues through the center of the city of Spartanburg serving as the terminus of Interstate 585 before intersecting Interstate 85 just north of the city. Shortly after I-85 it crosses a bridge over the Pacolet River. It continues to the city of Chesnee before exiting the state in a rural area of Cherokee County. The southern terminus of US 221 Alt. intersects the main route in the city of Chesnee and exits the state a few miles to the east of the main route.

== History ==
Established in 1932, US 221 was connected from North Carolina, from north of Cowpens National Battlefield to Greenwood, connecting the cities of Spartanburg, Woodruff, Laurens, and Waterloo. In 1942, US 221 replaced U.S. Route 221 in South Carolina#South Carolina Highway 110 (SC 110), going due north from Chesnee to the North Carolina state line; its former route became US 221 Alternate. In 1954, US 221 was extended south to Bradley and McCormick, then south over the Clarks Hill Dam into Georgia; this replaced part of SC 10 and part of SC 670.

Between 1962 and 1964, US 221 bypassed Roebuck. Between 1968 and 1970, US 221 was rerouted onto the Greenwood Bypass and its current routing south of US 25/US 178, replacing the remaining part of SC 670. The old route through Greenwood became SC 72 Business and an extension of SC 10.

=== South Carolina Highway 104 ===
South Carolina Highway 104
- Location: McCormick
- Existed: 1939–1947

South Carolina Highway 104 (SC 104) was a state highway that was established in 1939 from SC 43 (now U.S. Route 378 (US 378)) in McCormick northeast for about 4 miles (6.4 km). The next year, its northern terminus was extended to the north-northwest to SC 10 northeast of Troy. In 1947, the highway was decommissioned and downgraded to secondary roads. Most of its path was redesignated as parts of US 221.

==== Troy alternate route ====
South Carolina Highway 104 Alternate
- Location: Troy
- Existed: 1942–1947

South Carolina Highway 104 Alternate (SC 104 Alt.) was an alternate route that was established in 1942 from where SC 104 and SC 432 started a concurrency east-southeast of Troy, in the northeastern part of McCormick County to a point along their concurrency. In 1947, it was decommissioned. It is known today as Indianland Road and Dowtin Road.

=== South Carolina Highway 110 ===
South Carolina Highway 110
- Location: Chesnee, South Carolina
- Existed: 1931–1942

South Carolina Highway 110 (SC 110) was a state highway that was established in 1931 from US 378 in Chesnee north to the North Carolina state line, where it continued as the second iteration of North Carolina Highway 741. In 1942, US 221 was shifted to the west, replacing SC 110. Its former path was redesignated as US 221 Alternate.

== Major intersections ==
County	Location	mi	km	Destinations	Notes
Columbia		0.000	0.000	US 221 south / SR 150 west	Continuation into Georgia
Lake Strom Thurmond; Savannah River		0.000	0.000	Georgia state line (J. Strom Thurmond Dam)	
McCormick	Clarks Hill	1.850	2.977	SC 28 east – Augusta	Southern end of SC 28 concurrency
McCormick	Modoc	6.320	10.171	SC 23 east – Edgefield	Western terminus of SC 23
McCormick	Plum Branch	15.660	25.202	SC 283 east (Edgefield Street) / Collier Street west – Edgefield	Western terminus of SC 283 and Edgefield Street; eastern terminus of Collier Street
McCormick	McCormick	20.490	32.975	US 378 west (Gold Street) / SC 28 north (Mine Street)	Northern end of SC 28 concurrency; southern end of US 378 concurrency
McCormick	McCormick	21.100	33.957	US 378 east (Gold Street East)	Northern end of US 378 concurrency
Greenwood	Bradley	29.580	47.604	SC 10 south (McCormick Highway) – Troy	Southern end of SC 10 concurrency
Greenwood	Bradley	31.830	51.225	SC 10 north (McCormick Highway) – Verdery, Promised Land	Northern end of SC 10 concurrency
Greenwood	Greenwood	40.440	65.082	SC 225 – Edgefield, Abbeville, Medical District	Provides access to Self Regional Healthcare
Greenwood	Greenwood	41.380	66.595	US 25 south / US 178 east / US 25 Bus. north / US 178 Bus. west (Main Street South) – Saluda, Edgefield, Lander University	Southern end of US 25/US 178 concurrency; southern terminus of US 25 Bus.; eastern terminus of US 178 Bus.; provides access to Self Regional Medical Center
Greenwood	Greenwood	42.500– 42.501	68.397– 68.399	SC 34 (Main Street West / Ninety Six Highway) – Ninety Six, Greenwood, Ninety Six National Historic Site	Interchange
Greenwood	Greenwood	46.110	74.207	US 25 north / US 178 west / SC 72 west (Bypass Northeast) / SC 72 Bus. west (Reynolds Avenue) – Abbeville, Greenwood	Northern end of US 25/178 concurrency; southern end of SC 72 concurrency; eastern terminus of SC 72 Bus.
Greenwood	Coronaca	51.040	82.141	SC 246 – Coronaca, GWD State Park, Erskine College	
Laurens	Waterloo	54.400	87.548	SC 72 east	Northern end of SC 72 concurrency
Laurens	Laurens	64.020	103.030	SC 39 south – Cross Hill	Northern terminus of SC 39
Laurens	Laurens	68.340	109.983	SC 127 north / US 221 Truck north (Bypass 127) – Clinton	Southern terminus of US 221 Truck and SC 127
Laurens	Laurens	70.680	113.748	US 76 Bus. (Main Street East) – Sanders Middle School	
Laurens	Laurens	71.160	114.521	US 76 / US 221 Truck south (Hillcrest Drive / Fleming Street) – Anderson	Northern terminus of US 221 Truck
Laurens	Laurens	72.680	116.967	SC 49 north (Yarborough Mill Road) to I-26 / I-385 south – Spartanburg, Columbia	Southern terminus of SC 49
Laurens	Laurens	74.910– 75.070	120.556– 120.813	I-385 – Columbia, Greenville	I-385 exit 9
Laurens	Ora	77.110	124.097	SC 308 east	Western terminus of SC 308
Laurens		81.070	130.470	SC 92 west	Southern end of SC 92 concurrency
Spartanburg	Enoree	82.520	132.803	SC 92 east (Parker Road) to I-26 – Cross Hill, Union	Northern end of SC 92 concurrency
Spartanburg	Enoree	82.570	132.884	SC 92 Conn. south	No access from US 221 to SC 92 Conn.; northern terminus of SC 92 Conn.
Spartanburg	Woodruff	89.610	144.213	SC 146 east (Cross Anchor Road) / Pearson Street north	Southern end of SC 146 concurrency; southern terminus of Pearson Street.
Spartanburg	Woodruff	90.180	145.131	SC 101 south (Georgia Street)	Southern end of SC 101 concurrency
Spartanburg	Woodruff	91.140	146.676	SC 101 north / SC 146 west – Greer, Greenville	Northern end of SC 101 and SC 146 concurrencies
Spartanburg	Moore	98.020	157.748	SC 290 west (Moore Duncan Highway) – R.D. Anderson Applied Technology Center	Eastern terminus of SC 290
Spartanburg	Roebuck	98.904– 99.030	159.171– 159.373	I-26 – Columbia, Asheville	I-26 exit 28
Spartanburg	Roebuck	101.040	162.608	SC 215 (Blackstock Road East / Stone Station Road)	
Spartanburg	Roebuck	104.250– 104.318	167.774– 167.884	SC 295 (Southport Road) – South Carolina Deaf and Blind School, Croft State Park	Interchange
Spartanburg	Spartanburg	107.300	172.683	SC 56 south (Henry Street) – Union, Reidville, Grain District, Rail trail	Southern end of SC 56 concurrency
Spartanburg	Spartanburg	107.680	173.294	US 29 (St. John Street) – Barnet Park, Chapman Center, Converse College, The George	
Spartanburg	Spartanburg	108.590	174.759	SC 56 north (Asheville Highway) – Inman, Asheville	Northern end of SC 56 concurrency
Spartanburg	Spartanburg	107.900	173.648	SC 296 (Daniel Morgan Avenue East)	
Spartanburg	Spartanburg	109.050	175.499	Wood Street (US 176 Conn. east)	Western terminus of US 176 Conn.; provides access to Spartanburg Medical Center
Spartanburg	Spartanburg	109.230	175.789	North Church Street north (US 176 Conn. west) / Whitney Road begins – Boiling Springs	Eastern terminus of US 176 Conn., which takes on the North Church Street name; southern terminus of Whitney Road
Spartanburg	Spartanburg	109.490	176.207	I-585 / US 176 / SC 9 (Pine Street North) – Union, Chester, Inman	I-585 exit 25B
Spartanburg	Spartanburg	113.499– 113.500	182.659– 182.661	I-85 – Greenville, Charlotte	I-85 exit 78
Spartanburg	Chesnee	123.540	198.818	US 221 Alt. / SC 11 (Cherokee Street / Cherokee Foothills Scenic Highway) – Gaffney, Campobello, Carolina Foothills Artisan Center, Cowpens Battlefield	Northern terminus of US 221 Alt.
Cherokee		124.220	199.913	North Pickens Street south (US 221 Conn. south) to US 221 Alt.	Northern terminus of US 221 Conn. and North Pickens Street
Cherokee		126.390	203.405	US 221 north	Continuation into North Carolina
1.000 mi = 1.609 km; 1.000 km = 0.621 mi: Concurrency terminus; Incomplete access

== Special routes ==
There is one truck route and one alternate route in South Carolina.

== See also ==
- SC National Heritage Corridor | Belton Alliance
- The South Carolina National Heritage Corridor: plantations to mill villages - The South Carolina National Heritage Corridor: plantations to mill villages - South Caroliniana Library Map Collection - UofSC Digital Collections
- Overmountain Victory National Historic Trail (U.S. National Park Service)

U.S. Route 221
Previous state: Georgia	South Carolina	Next state: North Carolina
