= Mountville, South Carolina =

- Census-designated place
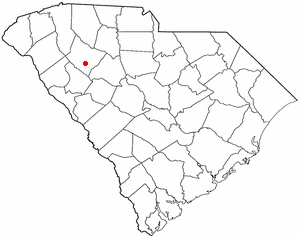
- Location of Mountville, South Carolina
- Coordinates: 34°22′20″N 81°58′29″W
- Country: United States
- State: South Carolina
- County: Laurens

Area
  - Total: 2.88 sq mi (7.45 km^{2})
  - Land: 2.86 sq mi (7.41 km^{2})
  - Water: 0.015 sq mi (0.04 km^{2})
- Elevation: 630 ft (190 m)

Population (2020)
  - Total: 100
  - Density: 35/sq mi (13.5/km^{2})
- Time zone: UTC-5 (Eastern (EST))
  - Summer (DST): UTC-4 (EDT)
- ZIP code: 29370
- Area codes: 864, 821
- FIPS code: 45-48670
- GNIS feature ID: 2403315

Mountville is an unincorporated community and census-designated place (CDP) in Laurens County, South Carolina, United States. The population was 108 at the 2010 census, down from 130 at the 2000 census. It is part of the Greenville–Mauldin–Easley Metropolitan Statistical Area.

== Geography ==
Mountville is located in southern Laurens County. South Carolina Highway 72 runs along the eastern side of the community, leading northeast 10 miles (16 km) to Clinton and southwest 17 miles (27 km) to Greenwood. South Carolina Highway 39 forms the western edge of the Mountville CDP; it leads north 12 miles (19 km) to Laurens, the county seat, and south 3 miles (5 km) to Highway 72 at Cross Hill.

According to the United States Census Bureau, the Mountville CDP has a total area of 2.9 square miles (7.4 km^{2}), of which 0.02 square miles (0.04 km^{2}), or 0.54%, are water. The CDP drains east to Beaverdam Creek, a tributary of the Little River, part of the Saluda River watershed, and south to North Campbell Creek, a tributary of Mudlick Creek, which also flows to the Little River and thence the Saluda.

== Demographics ==
Historical population
Census	Pop.	Note	%±
2020	100		—
U.S. Decennial Census

As of the census of 2000, there were 130 people, 51 households, and 41 families residing in the CDP. The population density was 45.9 inhabitants per square mile (17.7/km^{2}). There were 59 housing units at an average density of 20.8/sq mi (8.0/km^{2}). The racial makeup of the CDP was 83.85% White, 15.38% African American, and 0.77% from two or more races.

There were 51 households, out of which 27.5% had children under the age of 18 living with them, 58.8% were married couples living together, 15.7% had a female householder with no husband present, and 19.6% were non-families. 13.7% of all households were made up of individuals, and 9.8% had someone living alone who was 65 years of age or older. The average household size was 2.55 and the average family size was 2.78.

In the CDP, the population was spread out, with 21.5% under the age of 18, 5.4% from 18 to 24, 23.8% from 25 to 44, 28.5% from 45 to 64, and 20.8% who were 65 years of age or older. The median age was 42 years. For every 100 females, there were 85.7 males. For every 100 females age 18 and over, there were 88.9 males.

The median income for a household in the CDP was $42,885, and the median income for a family was $32,083. Males had a median income of $38,750 versus $31,250 for females. The per capita income for the CDP was $20,498. There were 17.4% of families and 18.0% of the population living below the poverty line, including 46.2% of under eighteens and none of those over 64.

== Education ==
It is in the Laurens School District 56. The district's comprehensive high school is Clinton High School.
