= Alfred T. B. Hunter =

American politician

South Carolina House of Representatives
- In office 1874–?

Personal details
- Born: c. 1850 Laurens County, South Carolina
- Died: 1918 (aged 67–68)
- Party: Republican

Alfred T. B. Hunter (c. 1850-1918) was an African-American politician and farmer from South Carolina. He was enslaved at birth in Laurens County. In 1874, he was elected to the South Carolina House of Representatives as one of four representatives from Laurens. He served on the Medical Committee and the on Committee for Roads, Bridges, and Ferries. In 1896, Hunter purchased a 65 acre farm, which his grandchildren still owned as of 1968.

== See also ==
- African American officeholders from the end of the Civil War until before 1900
