= South Carolina Highway 127 =

State highway in South Carolina, United States

South Carolina Highway 127

Route information
- Maintained by SCDOT
- Length: 3.620 mi (5.826 km)

Major junctions
- South end: US 221 / US 221 Truck near Laurens
- North end: US 76 / US 76 Bus. / US 221 Truck in Laurens

Location
- Country: United States
- State: South Carolina
- Counties: Laurens

Highway system
- South Carolina State Highway System; Interstate; US; State; Scenic
| ← SC 126 | → SC 128 |

South Carolina Highway 127 (SC 127) is a 3.620-mile-long (5.826 km) state highway in the U.S. state of South Carolina. The highway functions as a truck route of Laurens. In fact, it is the through route for truck traffic along U.S. Route 221 (US 221) and is concurrent with US 221 Truck for its entire length.

== Route description ==
SC 127 begins at an intersection with US 221 (Greenwood Road). This is also the southern terminus of US 221 Truck south of Laurens within Laurens. The highways travel to the east and cross over Burnt Mill Creek. They curve to the northeast and have an interchange with South Harper Street Extension. After crossing the Little River, they meet US 76 (East Main Street); this intersection also marks the eastern terminus of US 76 Business. SC 127 ends here though US 76 and US 221 Truck continue to travel to the northwest of the city's downtown area.

== Major intersections ==
The entire route is in Laurens County.

| Location | mi | km | Destinations | Notes |
|---|---|---|---|---|
| | 0.000 | 0.000 | US 221 (Greenwood Road) / US 221 Truck begins – Greenwood, Laurens | Southern end of US 221 Truck concurrency; southern terminus of US 221 Truck and SC 127 |
| | 1.840 | 2.961 | South Harper Street Extension – Laurens, Greenwood | Interchange |
| Laurens | 3.620 | 5.826 | US 76 Bus. west (East Main Street) – Laurens US 76 west / US 221 Truck north (Exchange Road) US 76 east – Clinton | Northern end of US 221 Truck concurrency; northern terminus of SC 127; eastern terminus of US 76 |
1.000 mi = 1.609 km; 1.000 km = 0.621 mi: Concurrency terminus
