= South Carolina Highway 576 =

Highway in South Carolina, US

South Carolina Highway 576

Route information
- Maintained by SCDOT
- Length: 3.090 mi (4.973 km)
- Existed: 1973–present

Major junctions
- West end: US 76 west of Marion
- East end: US 501 Bus. / SC 41 Alt. near Marion

Location
- Country: United States
- State: South Carolina
- Counties: Marion

Highway system
- South Carolina State Highway System; Interstate; US; State; Scenic
← SC 560	→ I-585

South Carolina Highway 576 (SC 576) is a 3.090-mile (4.973 km) primary state highway in the state of South Carolina. The highway connects U.S. Route 76 (US 76), west of Marion, to US 501, south-southeast of the city.

== Route description ==
SC 576 serves to keep the continuation of the four-lane divided highway that travelers get on in Florence to Myrtle Beach and vice versa.

== History ==
Established in 1973 as new primary routing, connecting US 76 and US 501 Business/SC 41 Alternate; it was built as a four-lane divided highway; it has remained unchanged since.

== Junction list ==
The entire route is in Marion County.

Location	mi	km	Destinations	Notes
	0.000	0.000	US 76 / Wahee Road south to I-95 – Florence, Marion, Mullins	Western terminus of SC 576; northern terminus of Wahee Road; Robert J. McIntyre Sr. Intersection
	3.090	4.973	US 501 Bus. / SC 41 Alt. – Marion, Johnsonville, Conway, Myrtle Beach	Eastern terminus
1.000 mi = 1.609 km; 1.000 km = 0.621 mi
