= Lake Rabon =

Lake in South Carolina, United States

Coordinates: 34°28′53″N 82°08′29″W

Lake Rabon is an artificial lake in Laurens County in the U.S. state of South Carolina, formed by an earth gravity dam on the south side of the lake at the confluence of Payne's Branch and Rabon Creek. It is owned by the Laurens County Water and Sewer Commission (LCWSC).

== Sources ==
- "Lake Rabon". Laurens County Water & Sewer Commission. 2014-09-06.
- "Lake Rabon Dam Inspection and Rehabilitation". Hazen and Sawyer.
