= Barksdale, South Carolina =

Settlement in South Carolina, United States

Coordinates: 34.57027°N 82.08998°W

Barksdale is an unincorporated community in Laurens County, in the U.S. state of South Carolina.

== History ==
A post office called Barksdale was established in 1892, and remained in operation until 1933. The community derives its name from a local family of pioneer settlers.

In 1925, Barksdale had 35 inhabitants.
