= Clinton High School (South Carolina) =

Location
- 18132 Hwy 72 E Laurens; Clinton, South Carolina 29325; United States; 34°29′07″N 81°51′14″W

Information
- School type: Public
- Founded: 1917 (109 years ago)
- School district: Laurens County School District 56
- Superintendent: David O'Shields
- Principal: Martha Brothers
- Teaching staff: 58.70 (FTE)
- Grades: 9–12
- Enrollment: 760 (2023-2024)
- Student to teacher ratio: 12.95
- Schedule: Monday–Friday
- Hours in school day: 7
- Colors: Red and white
- Song: CHS Alma Mater
- Fight song: CHS Fight Song (To the tune of the Victory March)
- Sports: Football, basketball, cheerleading, cross country, tennis, golf, baseball, softball, soccer, track and field, volleyball
- Team name: Red Devils
- Rival: Laurens District 55 High School Woodruff High School
- Yearbook: Clintonian
- Communities served: Clinton, Cross Hill, Joanna, and Mountville.
- Feeder schools: Clinton Middle School
- Website: chs.lcsd56.org

Clinton High School (CHS) is a four-year public high school located in Clinton, South Carolina, United States. It is the lone high school in Laurens County School District 56 and one of two in Laurens County, South Carolina.

The district includes the following communities (and therefore, as does the high school's attendance boundary): Clinton, Cross Hill, Joanna, and Mountville.

== History ==
Clinton High School was originally housed on Hampton Avenue; it opened in 1917. This school was later replaced by a new building on North Adair Street, which opened in 1956. In late 2008, construction started on a new building on Highway 72 and opened in August 2010. The North Adair Street building was partially remodeled and opened in the fall of 2015 as Clinton Middle School, replacing Bell Street Middle School as District 56's lone middle school.

== Athletics ==
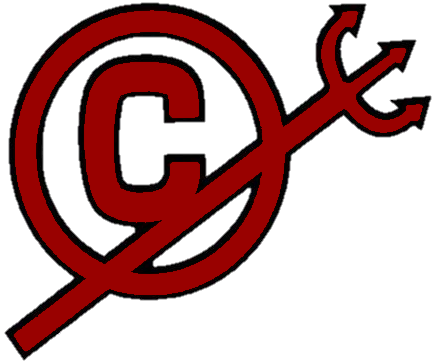
Clinton High School's primary athletic logo

Clinton High School, nicknamed the Red Devils, is a member of South Carolina's AA high school classification, competing in Region III. The Red Devils' main rivals are the Laurens Raiders; their annual season-opening rivalry football game attracts some 10,000 spectators each year. Clinton hosts football games off-campus at Richardson Field at Wilder Stadium (located on campus at the old high school building), as they have since 1975. As of 2018, Wilder Stadium also hosts men's and women's soccer matches; the stadium also hosted women's lacrosse until its discontinuation following the 2017 season. The Clinton High School Gymnasium hosts men's and women's basketball, as well as volleyball. Baseball and softball also play in new on-campus stadiums.

As of the 2025–2026 season, the Red Devils compete in South Carolina's Region I–AA.

=== State championships ===
- Baseball: 1960, 1961, 2023, 2025
- Boys Tennis: 1971, 1972, 1973, 1974, 2000
- Marksmanship: 1998, 1999, 2000, 2001, 2002, 2003, 2004
- Football: 1939, 1972, 1975, 1977, 1978, 1985, 1987, 2009 2024 state 2A Champions football.

== Notable alumni ==
- Jackie K. Cooper (born 1941), author and film critic
