= Jackie K. Cooper =

American film critic

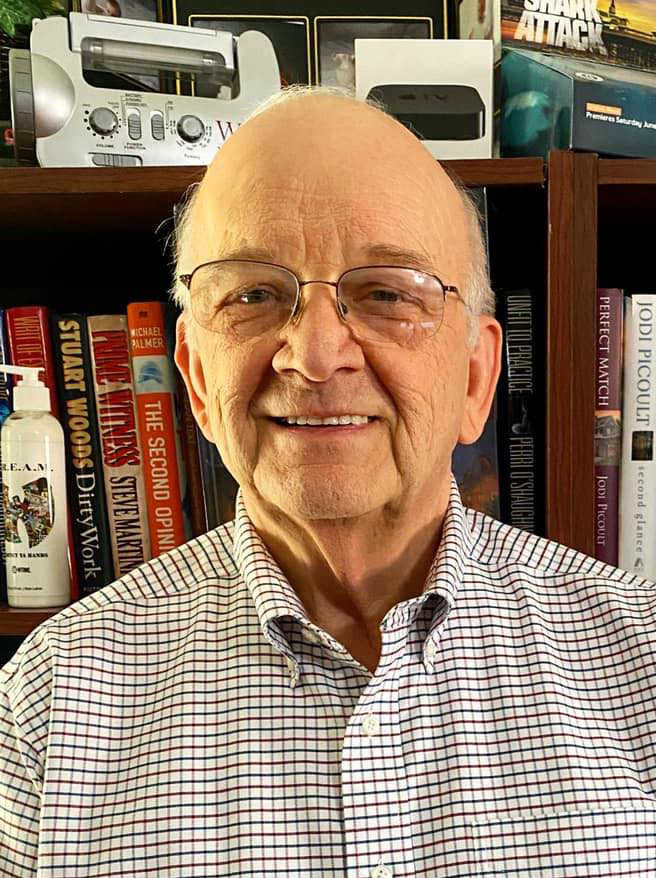
- Jackie K. Cooper at his office in Perry, Georgia
- Born: Jackie Kershaw Cooper; September 13, 1941 (age 84); Clinton, South Carolina, United States
- Education: Erskine College (B.A.); University of South Carolina School of Law (J.D.)
- Occupations: Author; film critic
- Years active: 1980–present
- Children: 2

YouTube information
- Channel: JackieKCooper
- Subscribers: 98 thousand
- Views: 2.5 million
- Last updated: November 5, 2025
- Website: www.jackiekcooper.com

Jackie Kershaw Cooper (born September 13, 1941) is an American author and film critic. He is the host of the Jackie K. Cooper Show, an entertainment review television show broadcast weekly on Com South and Progressive Tel cable networks in the Middle Georgia area. He is also one of the founders of the Southeastern Film Critics Association and is also a member of the Broadcast Film Critics Association and the Broadcast Television Journalists Association.

== Life and career ==
Cooper was born in Clinton, South Carolina and attended Clinton High School. He graduated from Erskine College in 1963 with a Bachelor of Arts degree in history and social studies, and in 1967 from the University of South Carolina School of Law with a Juris Doctor. Cooper began writing movie reviews for the Houston Home Journal, a small market news outlet in Perry, Georgia, in 1974. Several years later, the Houston Home Journal was purchased by Millard Grimes. As a result, Cooper's reviews were picked up by Grimes’ eight additional small market newspapers and appeared in Grimes’ publications until the mid-1990s. For two years, beginning in 1980, Cooper lived in Redlands, California where he continued to write reviews for Grimes while also writing for the Redlands Daily Facts newspapers. During Cooper's time in California, he made weekly trips to Los Angeles for movie premiers, press parties and interview opportunities – making industry contacts and establishing relationships that have lasted until the present. Cooper is a Rotten Tomatoes approved film critic, and Huffington Post contributor.

=== Television ===
In 1984, Cooper began broadcasting televised movie reviews for the CBS affiliate station in Macon, Georgia. In the following year, Cooper moved to the ABC affiliate where he taped three movie review spots weekly. In 1992, Jackie moved to the Fox station and also began broadcasting two weekly review spots on the Macon NBC affiliate station, an arrangement that lasted for ten years. Beginning in 2011, Cooper began taping weekly installments of the Jackie K. Cooper Show. The Jackie K. Cooper Show is broadcast weekly on Com South and Progressive Tel, cable networks in the Middle Georgia area.

=== YouTube ===
Cooper has gained a following on YouTube with his weekly “Two Minute Entertainment Rundown”; his subscriber count on YouTube grew from 136 to over 100,000 in just a few days, after his videos were posted on various internet forums including Reddit.

== Personal life ==
Jackie lives in Perry, Georgia, and is the author of 7 books of memoirs and short stories. Cooper married in 1970 and has two sons and four grandchildren.
