= Musgrove Mill State Historic Site =

- Musgrove's Mill Historic Battle Site
- U.S. National Register of Historic Places
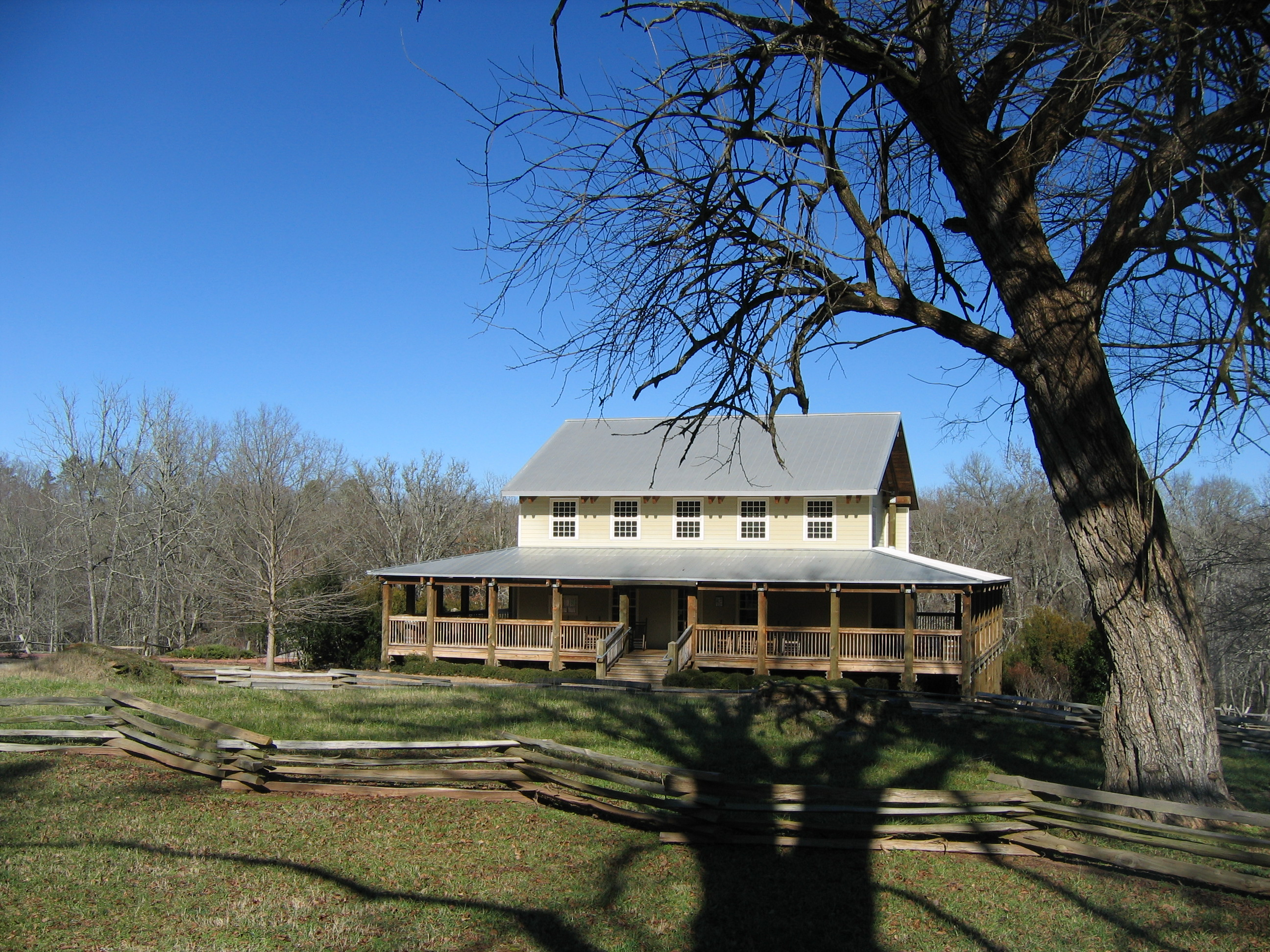
- Visitors Center, Musgrove Mill State Historic Site

- Location within South Carolina Location within the United States
- Nearest city: Cross Anchor, South Carolina
- Coordinates: 34°35′36.76″N 81°51′8.92″W
- Area: 380 acres (150 ha)
- Built: 1780
- NRHP reference No.: 75001708
- Added to NRHP: March 4, 1975

Musgrove Mill State Historic Site was the site of the Battle of Musgrove Mill, an action in the American Revolutionary War, which occurred on August 19, 1780, near the Enoree River, on what (in the 21st century) is the border between Spartanburg, Laurens, and Union Counties in South Carolina, approximately seven miles from Interstate 26.

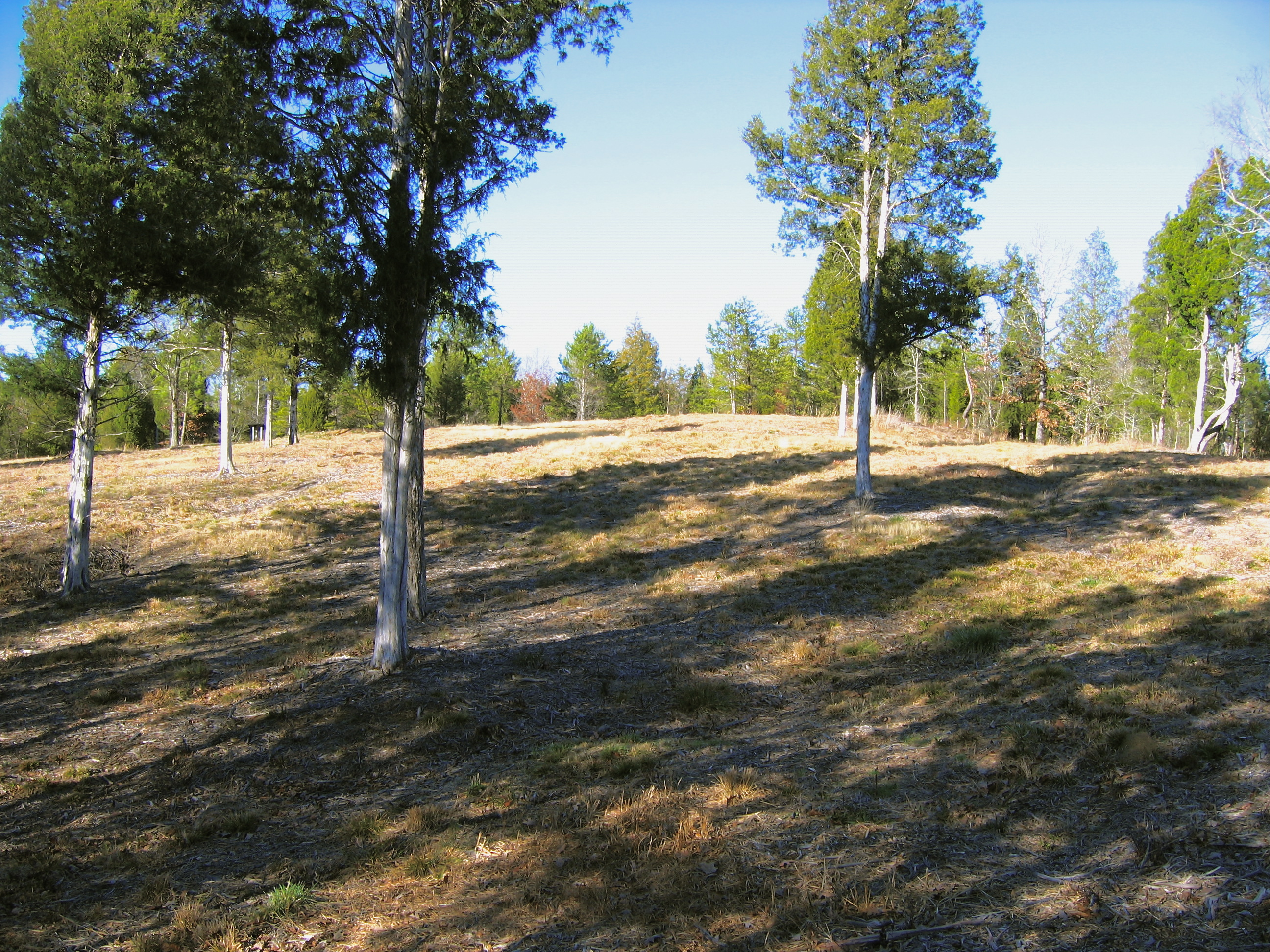
Musgrove Mill Battlefield

In the August 1780, a group of 200 Patriot militiamen attempted to strike what they thought was an equal number of Loyalists camped near a ford on the Enoree River. The Loyalists, however, had recently been joined by 300 more, two hundred of them provincial regulars from the British post at Ninety Six, South Carolina. Once discovered, the Patriots were unable to either retreat or make a frontal assault. Instead they took up a position behind logs and brush on a nearby ridge and lured the Loyalists into attacking them. A fierce fight ensued and turned into a near rout of the Loyalists. Nevertheless, when the Patriot militia learned that American forces had been defeated three days before at the Battle of Camden, they also retreated.

North Carolina Patriot militia leader Col. Isaac Shelby, campaigning to Musgrove Mill from the area of present-day northeast Tennessee, fought at the Battle of Musgrove Mill with a small force of Overmountain Men. After the battle, Shelby and his Overmountain Men returned over the Appalachia Mountains to the Sycamore Shoals (located at present-day Elizabethton, Tennessee). Shelby was one of the Patriot officers mustering weeks later at Sycamore Shoals on September 25, 1780, in advance of the early October 7, 1780 Battle of Kings Mountain.

The Musgrove Mill battle site was listed on the U.S. National Register of Historic Places in 1975. The park includes a visitor center with interpretive exhibits, a memorial to the legendary Mary Musgrove (featured in a popular early 19th-century novel), two marked trails, a picnic area, a fishing pond, a canoe launch, and a small waterfall.
