= Cross Anchor, South Carolina =

Cross Anchor
- Census-designated place
- Location within the state of South Carolina
- Coordinates: 34°38′39″N 81°51′30″W
- Country: United States
- State: South Carolina
- County: Spartanburg

Area
  - Total: 0.78 sq mi (2.01 km^{2})
  - Land: 0.77 sq mi (2.00 km^{2})
  - Water: 0.0039 sq mi (0.01 km^{2})
- Elevation: 669 ft (204 m)

Population (2020)
  - Total: 116
  - Density: 149.9/sq mi (57.89/km^{2})
- Time zone: UTC-5 (Eastern (EST))
  - Summer (DST): UTC-4 (EDT)
- ZIP code: 29335
- Area codes: 864, 821
- FIPS code: 45-17845
- GNIS feature ID: 2629823

Cross Anchor is a Census-designated place in Spartanburg County, South Carolina, United States. The population in the 2010 United States census was 126.

== History ==
A community post office called Cross Anchor has been in operation since 1809. Cross Anchor may have been named for an old tavern sign depicting two anchors crossed. Alternatively, one Union County historian has stated the name originates from two British brothers who sailed to South Carolina before moving inland. Upon arriving in the Upstate region of the state, the brother who piloted the ship decided to settle in Cross Anchor, naming the community in honor of his role in the brothers' journey. The other brother, who possessed the ship's keys, named and settled the nearby community of Cross Keys.

The Musgrove Mill State Historic Site, located in Cross Anchor, was listed on the National Register of Historic Places in 1975.

== Geography ==
Cross Anchor is located in extreme southern Spartanburg County. The community's central location is the intersection of South Carolina Highways 49 and 56 where one traffic light exists. Nearby towns include Woodruff, Clinton, Union, and Pauline. Interstate 26 (approximately 8 miles from the town center) allows for easy access to Spartanburg to the north, and the capital, Columbia, to the south.

== Demographics ==
Historical population
| Census | Pop. | Note | %± |
|---|---|---|---|
| 2020 | 116 | | — |
U.S. Decennial Census

== Education ==
The school district is Spartanburg School District 4.
