= Jalapa, South Carolina =

Unincorporated community in South Carolina, US

Coordinates: 34°20′40″N 81°41′07″W

Jalapa is an unincorporated community in Newberry County, South Carolina, United States. The elevation is 564 feet.

During the Mexican–American War, Xalapa was a stopping point between Veracruz and Mexico City. A volunteer force from South Carolina, the Palmetto Regiment, included soldiers from Newberry County. These soldiers marched through Xalapa on their way to Puebla and possibly fought in the nearby Battle of Cerro Gordo. Upon returning home, they named their community after Xalapa, spelling it Jalapa.

Jalapa was the site of a cotton gin run by the Summer Brothers firm, which closed down during the Great Depression.
