= Joanna, South Carolina =

- Census-designated place
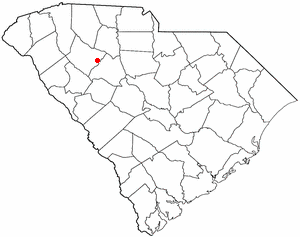
- Location of Joanna, South Carolina
- Coordinates: 34°24′54″N 81°48′31″W
- Country: United States
- State: South Carolina
- County: Laurens

Area
  - Total: 3.14 sq mi (8.14 km^{2})
  - Land: 3.14 sq mi (8.13 km^{2})
  - Water: 0.0039 sq mi (0.01 km^{2})
- Elevation: 594 ft (181 m)

Population (2020)
  - Total: 1,517
  - Density: 483.5/sq mi (186.69/km^{2})
- Time zone: UTC-5 (Eastern (EST))
  - Summer (DST): UTC-4 (EDT)
- ZIP code: 29351
- Area codes: 864, 821
- FIPS code: 45-36790
- GNIS feature ID: 2402634

Joanna is an unincorporated community and census-designated place (CDP) in Laurens County, South Carolina, United States. The population was 1,539 at the 2010 census, down from 1,609 at the 2000 census. It is part of the Greenville–Mauldin–Easley Metropolitan Statistical Area.

== History ==
The community was first settled in the 1760s. By the 1850s, the town was known as "Martin's Depot", in honor of a local planter, Martin Kinard, who had helped bring the Laurens Railroad through. On April 30, 1865, Confederate President Jefferson Davis and his cabinet passed through the town on their flight from Richmond and spent the night at the Lafayette Young house, 5 miles (8 km) to the southwest. Martin's Depot was renamed "Goldville" in 1872. In 1948 the name of the town was again changed, to "Joanna", the name of the wife of a local industrialist.

== Geography ==
Joanna is located in eastern Laurens County. U.S. Route 76 passes through the east side of the community, leading northwest 6 miles (10 km) to Clinton and 14 miles (23 km) to Laurens, the county seat, and southeast 16 miles (26 km) to Newberry. Interstate 26 passes 3 miles (5 km) northeast of Joanna, accessible from South Carolina Highway 66.

According to the United States Census Bureau, the CDP has a total area of 3.1 square miles (8.1 km^{2}), of which 0.004 square miles (0.01 km^{2}), or 0.18%, are water. The CDP extends west to the upper reaches of the Bush River, a southeast-flowing tributary of the Saluda River, and east to Indian Creek, an east-flowing tributary of the Enoree River and then the Broad River.

== Demographics ==
Historical population
Census	Pop.	Note	%±
2020	1,517		—
U.S. Decennial Census

As of the census of 2000, there were 1,609 people, 688 households, and 460 families residing in the CDP. The population density was 510.5 inhabitants per square mile (197.1/km^{2}). There were 758 housing units at an average density of 240.5 per square mile (92.9/km^{2}). The racial makeup of the CDP was 85.77% White, 11.75% African American, 0.12% Native American, 0.25% Asian, 1.24% from other races, and 0.87% from two or more races. Hispanic or Latino of any race were 2.05% of the population.

There were 688 households, out of which 27.5% had children under the age of 18 living with them, 48.8% were married couples living together, 12.5% had a female householder with no husband present, and 33.0% were non-families. 29.4% of all households were made up of individuals, and 17.4% had someone living alone who was 65 years of age or older. The average household size was 2.33 and the average family size was 2.88.

In the CDP, the population was spread out, with 23.1% under the age of 18, 6.7% from 18 to 24, 26.1% from 25 to 44, 23.9% from 45 to 64, and 20.3% who were 65 years of age or older. The median age was 41 years. For every 100 females, there were 86.2 males. For every 100 females age 18 and over, there were 83.4 males.

The median income for a household in the CDP was $27,891, and the median income for a family was $35,000. Males had a median income of $27,271 versus $19,338 for females. The per capita income for the CDP was $14,500. About 10.6% of families and 16.0% of the population were below the poverty line, including 26.3% of those under age 18 and 15.9% of those age 65 or over.

== Education ==
It is in the Laurens School District 56. The district's comprehensive high school is Clinton High School.
