= Kinards, South Carolina =

Unincorporated community in South Carolina, US

Coordinates: 34°22′49″N 81°46′38″W

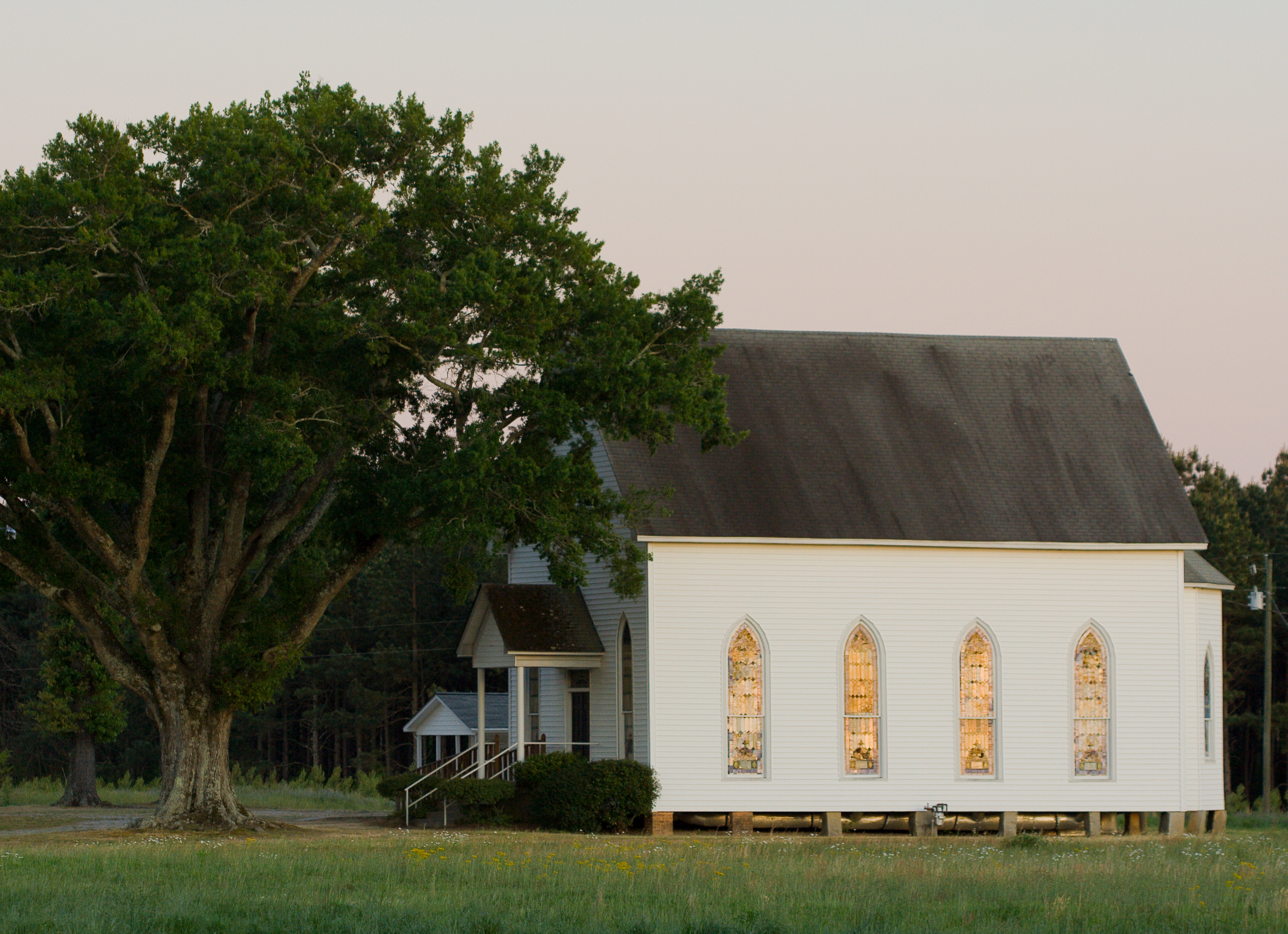
Sharon United Methodist Church in Kinards

Kinards (/ˈkaɪnərdz/ KY-nərdz; also Kinard) is an unincorporated community in Laurens and Newberry counties in the U.S. state of South Carolina. It had a post office that now is closed permanently, with the ZIP Code of 29355. Kinards was first established as Kinards Turnout when the post office opened February 26, 1856. The population of the ZCTA for ZIP Code 29355 was 801 at the 2000 census.
