= Laurens County, South Carolina =

County in South Carolina, United States

- County
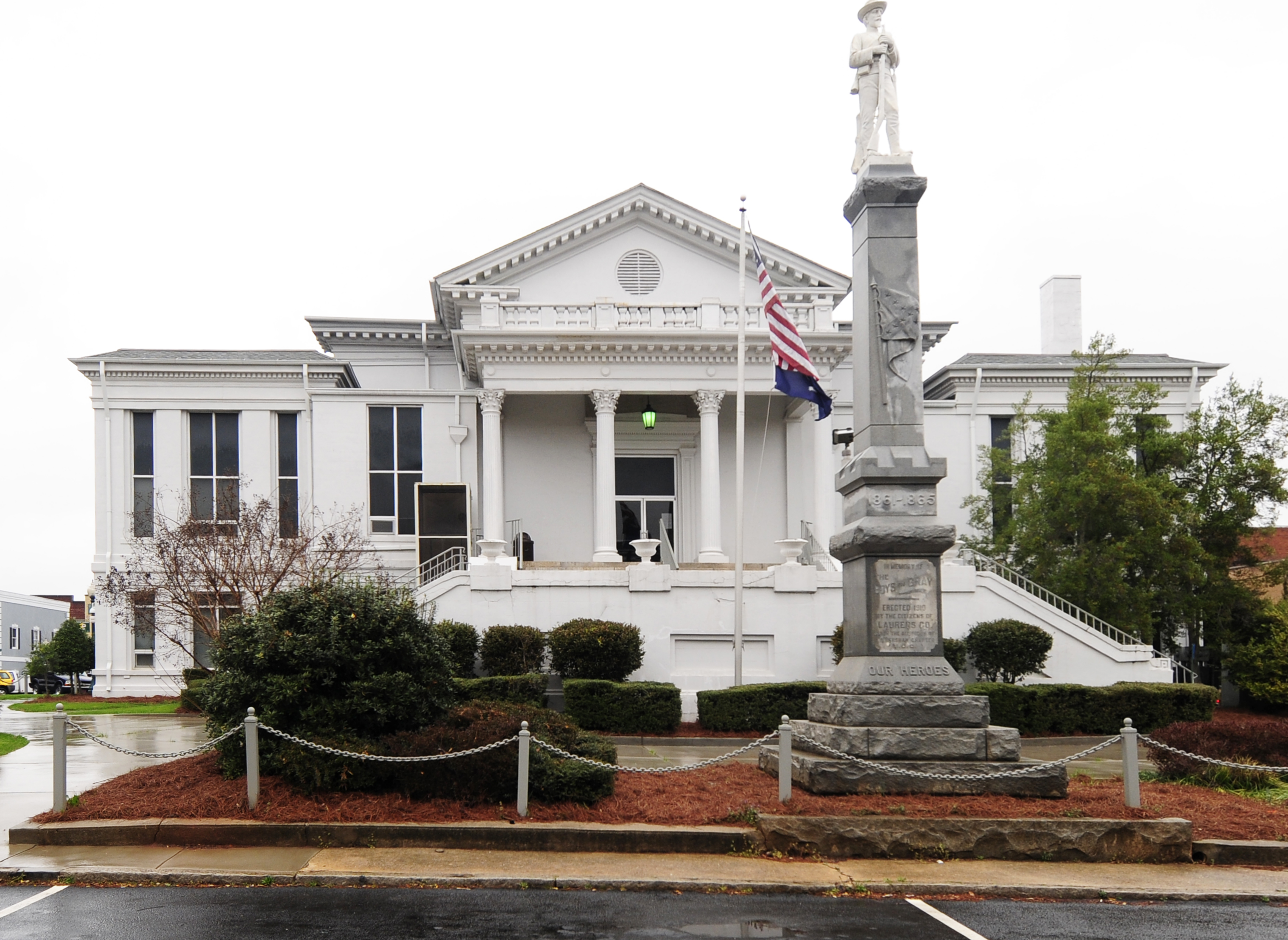
- Laurens County Courthouse and Confederate Monument

- Seal Logo
- Motto: "A Great Place In South Carolina"
- Location within the U.S. state of South Carolina
- Interactive map of Laurens County, South Carolina
- Coordinates: 34.48°N 82.01°W
- Country: United States
- State: South Carolina
- Founded: 1785
- Named for: Henry Laurens
- Seat: Laurens
- Largest community: Laurens

Area
  - Total: 722.93 sq mi (1,872.4 km^{2})
  - Land: 712.87 sq mi (1,846.3 km^{2})
  - Water: 10.06 sq mi (26.1 km^{2}) 1.39%

Population (2020)
  - Total: 67,539
  - Estimate (2025): 71,848 ▲
  - Density: 94.742/sq mi (36.580/km^{2})
- Time zone: UTC−5 (Eastern)
  - Summer (DST): UTC−4 (EDT)
- Congressional district: 3rd
- Website: laurenscounty.us

Laurens County is a county located in the U.S. state of South Carolina. As of the 2020 census, its population was 67,539. Its county seat is Laurens. Laurens County is included in the Greenville-Anderson-Greer, SC Metropolitan Statistical Area.

== History ==
Laurens County was formed on March 12, 1785. It was named after Henry Laurens, the fifth president of the Continental Congress.

One of nine modern counties of the Colonial Ninety-Six District, Laurens County hosted more "official" (i.e. officially recognized and contemporaneously documented by competent governments) battles than did half of the original colonies. The Battle of Musgrove Mill was the first time during the American Revolution that regular soldiers of Great Britain were defeated in battle by militia.

== Geography ==
According to the U.S. Census Bureau, the county has a total area of 722.93 square miles (1,872.4 km^{2}), of which 712.87 square miles (1,846.3 km^{2}) is land and 10.06 square miles (26.1 km^{2}) (1.39%) is water.

=== National protected area ===
- Sumter National Forest (part)

=== State and local protected areas/sites ===
- Cliff Pitts Wildlife Management Area
- Clinton Reservoir Tract
- Gray Court Tract Wildlife Management Area
- Lake Rabon Park
- Laurens County Park
- Musgrove Mill State Historic Site

=== Major water bodies ===
- Bush River
- Enoree River
- Lake Greenwood
- Lake Rabon
- Saluda River

=== Adjacent counties ===
- Spartanburg County – north
- Union County – northeast
- Newberry County – southeast
- Greenwood County – south
- Abbeville County – southwest
- Anderson County – west
- Greenville County – northwest

=== Major highways ===
- I-26
- I-385
- US 25
- US 25 Bus.
- US 76
- US 76 Bus.
- US 221
- US 221 Truck
- SC 14
- SC 39
- SC 49
- SC 56
- SC 56 Bus.
- SC 66
- SC 66 Conn.
- SC 72
- SC 72 Bus.
- SC 101
- SC 127
- SC 252
- SC 252 Truck
- SC 418
- SC 560

=== Major infrastructure ===
- Laurens County Airport

== Demographics ==
Historical population
Census	Pop.	Note	%±
1790	9,337		—
1800	12,809		37.2%
1810	14,982		17.0%
1820	17,682		18.0%
1830	20,863		18.0%
1840	21,584		3.5%
1850	23,407		8.4%
1860	23,858		1.9%
1870	22,536		−5.5%
1880	29,444		30.7%
1890	31,610		7.4%
1900	24,311		−23.1%
1910	26,650		9.6%
1920	42,560		59.7%
1930	42,094		−1.1%
1940	44,185		5.0%
1950	46,974		6.3%
1960	47,609		1.4%
1970	49,713		4.4%
1980	52,214		5.0%
1990	58,092		11.3%
2000	69,567		19.8%
2010	66,537		−4.4%
2020	67,539		1.5%
2025 (est.)	71,848	▲	6.4%
U.S. Decennial Census; 1790–1960 1900–1990; 1990–2000 2010 2020

=== Racial and ethnic composition ===
Laurens County, South Carolina – Racial and ethnic composition Note: the US Census treats Hispanic/Latino as an ethnic category. This table excludes Latinos from the racial categories and assigns them to a separate category. Hispanics/Latinos may be of any race.
Race / Ethnicity (NH = Non-Hispanic)	Pop 1980	Pop 1990	Pop 2000	Pop 2010	Pop 2020	% 1980	% 1990	% 2000	% 2010	% 2020
White alone (NH)	36,798	41,369	49,358	45,900	44,358	70.48%	71.21%	70.95%	68.98%	65.68%
Black or African American alone (NH)	14,978	16,362	18,172	16,808	15,937	28.69%	28.17%	26.12%	25.26%	23.60%
Native American or Alaska Native alone (NH)	27	45	132	137	144	0.05%	0.08%	0.19%	0.21%	0.21%
Asian alone (NH)	44	91	97	175	295	0.08%	0.16%	0.14%	0.26%	0.44%
Native Hawaiian or Pacific Islander alone (NH)	x	x	19	25	24	x	x	0.03%	0.04%	0.04%
Other race alone (NH)	15	14	26	50	238	0.03%	0.02%	0.04%	0.08%	0.35%
Mixed race or Multiracial (NH)	x	x	411	713	2,396	x	x	0.59%	1.07%	3.55%
Hispanic or Latino (any race)	352	211	1,352	2,729	4,147	0.67%	0.36%	1.94%	4.10%	6.14%
Total	52,214	58,092	69,567	66,537	67,539	100.00%	100.00%	100.00%	100.00%	100.00%

=== 2020 census ===
As of the 2020 census, there were 67,539 people, 26,691 households, and 16,961 families residing in the county.

The median age was 42.1 years. 21.8% of residents were under the age of 18 and 19.5% of residents were 65 years of age or older. For every 100 females there were 94.6 males, and for every 100 females age 18 and over there were 91.5 males age 18 and over.

There were 26,691 households in the county, of which 29.3% had children under the age of 18 living with them and 30.9% had a female householder with no spouse or partner present. About 28.2% of all households were made up of individuals and 13.0% had someone living alone who was 65 years of age or older.

The racial makeup of the county was 65.68% White (non-Hispanic), 23.6% Black or African American (non-Hispanic), 0.21% Native American, 0.44% Asian, 0.04% Pacific Islander, 3.9% from other or mixed races, and 6.14% Hispanic or Latino of any race.

36.0% of residents lived in urban areas, while 64.0% lived in rural areas.

There were 31,276 housing units, of which 14.7% were vacant. Among occupied housing units, 71.8% were owner-occupied and 28.2% were renter-occupied. The homeowner vacancy rate was 1.6% and the rental vacancy rate was 8.6%.

=== 2010 census ===
At the 2010 census, there were 66,537 people, 25,525 households, and 17,707 families living in the county. The population density was 93.2 inhabitants per square mile (36.0/km^{2}). There were 30,709 housing units at an average density of 43.0 per square mile (16.6/km^{2}). The racial makeup of the county was 70.4% white, 25.4% black or African American, 0.3% Asian, 0.2% American Indian, 0.1% Pacific islander, 2.3% from other races, and 1.3% from two or more races. Those of Hispanic or Latino origin made up 4.1% of the population. In terms of ancestry, 11.8% were American, 9.8% were Irish, 9.6% were German, and 8.8% were English.

Of the 25,525 households, 32.9% had children under the age of 18 living with them, 46.6% were married couples living together, 17.2% had a female householder with no husband present, 30.6% were non-families, and 26.1% of all households were made up of individuals. The average household size was 2.51 and the average family size was 3.00. The median age was 39.9 years.

The median income for a household in the county was $37,529 and the median income for a family was $45,769. Males had a median income of $36,807 versus $26,799 for females. The per capita income for the county was $18,757. About 14.1% of families and 19.2% of the population were below the poverty line, including 31.0% of those under age 18 and 14.6% of those age 65 or over.

=== 2000 census ===
At the 2000 census, there were 69,567 people, 26,290 households, and 18,876 families living in the county. The population density was 97 people per square mile (37 people/km^{2}). There were 30,239 housing units at an average density of 42 per square mile (16/km^{2}). The racial makeup of the county was 71.57% White, 26.23% Black or African American, 0.28% Native American, 0.15% Asian, 0.05% Pacific Islander, 0.95% from other races, and 0.78% from two or more races. 1.94% of the population were Hispanic or Latino of any race.

There were 26,290 households, out of which 32.50% had children under the age of 18 living with them, 51.10% were married couples living together, 15.60% had a female householder with no husband present, and 28.20% were non-families. 24.60% of all households were made up of individuals, and 9.80% had someone living alone who was 65 years of age or older. The average household size was 2.55 and the average family size was 3.01.

In the county, the population was spread out, with 25.30% under the age of 18, 9.20% from 18 to 24, 28.50% from 25 to 44, 23.80% from 45 to 64, and 13.20% who were 65 years of age or older. The median age was 36 years. For every 100 females, there were 93.60 males. For every 100 females age 18 and over, there were 89.70 males.

The median income for a household in the county was $33,933, and the median income for a family was $39,739. Males had a median income of $30,402 versus $21,684 for females. The per capita income for the county was $15,761. About 11.60% of families and 14.30% of the population were below the poverty line, including 19.60% of those under age 18 and 13.50% of those age 65 or over.

As of December 2017, the county unemployment rate was 4.4%.

== Government and politics ==
During the 1870 South Carolina gubernatorial election, Joseph Crews was a county election commissioner in Laurens County, and in that capacity had ordered all ballot boxes to be set up in the county seat. This disadvantaged rural voters, but enabled him and the state militia to oversee the election process and to mobilize black voters. However, armed whites attacked the black militia and disarmed them; some were wounded, others murdered. "Like companies of Confederate cavalry", "heavily armed whites" pushed away black voters—until Federal troops came from twenty miles away, with Crews, and took the ballot boxes. but was murdered by Democrats in the run-up to the 1876 South Carolina gubernatorial election.

Until 1948, Laurens County was a Democratic Party stronghold similar to the rest of the Solid South, with Democratic presidential candidates receiving near-unanimous margins of victory in most years. The 20 years from 1948 to 1968 were a highly transitional time for the politics of South Carolina and Laurens County, largely in part due to the Democratic Party's increasing support for African-American civil rights and enfranchisement. South Carolinian Dixiecrat Strom Thurmond won the county in 1948, and Democrats won it back from 1952 to 1960. Barry Goldwater's opposition to the Civil Rights Act led the county to turn Republican for the first time in 1964, which it remained for Richard Nixon's two electoral victories. The county flipped to the Democratic column to support Jimmy Carter from neighboring Georgia in 1976 and 1980, the last Democrat to win the county. From 1984, the county has been consistently Republican in presidential elections, often by wide margins of victory.

United States presidential election results for Laurens County, South Carolina
Year	Republican		Democratic		Third party(ies)	
Year	No.	%	No.	%	No.	%
1900	30	1.91%	1,540	98.09%	0	0.00%
1904	50	2.73%	1,779	97.21%	1	0.05%
1912	6	0.38%	1,566	98.49%	18	1.13%
1916	14	0.73%	1,895	98.65%	12	0.62%
1920	35	1.52%	2,263	98.48%	0	0.00%
1924	6	0.28%	2,105	99.53%	4	0.19%
1928	44	2.16%	1,989	97.64%	4	0.20%
1932	13	0.47%	2,750	99.39%	4	0.14%
1936	13	0.42%	3,069	99.58%	0	0.00%
1940	40	1.46%	2,697	98.54%	0	0.00%
1944	38	1.84%	1,924	93.40%	98	4.76%
1948	69	2.62%	513	19.51%	2,047	77.86%
1952	3,400	47.91%	3,697	52.09%	0	0.00%
1956	1,377	20.71%	3,726	56.05%	1,545	23.24%
1960	3,299	42.05%	4,547	57.95%	0	0.00%
1964	5,081	53.79%	4,365	46.21%	0	0.00%
1968	4,813	39.75%	3,016	24.91%	4,279	35.34%
1972	8,141	74.46%	2,650	24.24%	142	1.30%
1976	5,300	41.31%	7,440	57.98%	91	0.71%
1980	6,036	42.83%	7,856	55.74%	201	1.43%
1984	9,729	64.49%	5,312	35.21%	45	0.30%
1988	9,731	61.97%	5,930	37.77%	41	0.26%
1992	8,347	48.53%	6,638	38.59%	2,215	12.88%
1996	8,057	48.69%	7,055	42.64%	1,435	8.67%
2000	12,102	59.29%	7,920	38.80%	388	1.90%
2004	14,466	60.71%	9,205	38.63%	158	0.66%
2008	15,334	58.34%	10,578	40.25%	370	1.41%
2012	14,746	58.02%	10,318	40.60%	352	1.38%
2016	16,816	63.30%	8,889	33.46%	861	3.24%
2020	20,004	65.61%	10,159	33.32%	325	1.07%
2024	21,110	69.87%	8,769	29.02%	334	1.11%

=== 2020 presidential election ===
United States presidential election in Laurens County, SC (2020)
Party	Candidate	Votes	%
Republican	Donald Trump	20,004	65.61%
Democratic	Joe Biden	10,159	33.32%
Libertarian	Jo Jorgensen	238	0.78%
Green	Howie Hawkins	67	0.22%
Alliance	Roque De La Fuente	20	0.07%
Total votes		38,488	100%

=== 2016 presidential election ===
United States presidential election in Laurens County, SC (2016)
Party	Candidate	Votes	%
Republican	Donald Trump	16,770	63.3%
Democratic	Hillary Clinton	8,845	33.4%
Libertarian	Gary Johnson	373	1.4%
Independent	Evan McMullin	200	0.8%
Green	Jill Stein	124	0.5%
Constitution	Darrell Castle	122	0.5%
American	Peter Skewes	40	0.2%
Total votes		26,474	100%

=== 2012 presidential election ===
United States presidential election in Laurens County, SC (2012)
Party	Candidate	Votes	%
Republican	Mitt Romney	14,746	58.02%
Democratic	Barack Obama	10,318	40.60%
Libertarian	Gary Johnson	178	0.70%
Constitution	Virgil Goode	99	0.39%
Green	Jill Stein	75	0.30%
Total votes		25,416	100%

=== 2008 presidential election ===
United States presidential election in Laurens County, SC (2008)
Party	Candidate	Votes	%
Republican	John McCain	15,334	58.34%
Democratic	Barack Obama	10,578	40.25%
Constitution	Chuck Baldwin	129	0.49%
Libertarian	Bob Barr	106	0.40%
Petition	Ralph Nader	74	0.28%
Green	Cynthia McKinney	61	0.23%
Total votes		26,282	100%

== Economy ==
In 2022, the GDP was $2.7 billion (about $39,119 per capita), and the real GDP was $2.4 billion (about $34,835 per capita) in chained 2017 dollars.

As of April 2024, some of the largest employers in the county include CeramTec, National Healthcare, Presbyterian College, Shaw Industries, Sterilite, and Walmart.

Employment and Wage Statistics by Industry in Laurens County, South Carolina - Q3 2023
Industry	Employment Counts	Employment Percentage (%)	Average Annual Wage ($)
Accommodation and Food Services	1,325	6.4	16,432
Administrative and Support and Waste Management and Remediation Services	942	4.5	25,844
Agriculture, Forestry, Fishing and Hunting	71	0.3	47,996
Arts, Entertainment, and Recreation	294	1.4	18,564
Construction	630	3.0	53,716
Educational Services	1,753	8.4	50,752
Finance and Insurance	277	1.3	47,164
Health Care and Social Assistance	2,038	9.8	56,628
Information	82	0.4	60,216
Management of Companies and Enterprises	4	0.0	101,140
Manufacturing	7,641	36.7	57,772
Mining, Quarrying, and Oil and Gas Extraction	32	0.2	64,792
Other Services (except Public Administration)	295	1.4	38,896
Professional, Scientific, and Technical Services	281	1.3	63,440
Public Administration	1,623	7.8	41,340
Real Estate and Rental and Leasing	61	0.3	44,304
Retail Trade	1,773	8.5	29,380
Transportation and Warehousing	1,014	4.9	54,392
Utilities	272	1.3	66,924
Wholesale Trade	428	2.1	64,740
Total	20,836	100.0%	48,348

== Education ==
There are four public school districts in the county. Laurens County District 55 covers what is generally the northeastern half of the county while District 56 covers the southwestern half. The Ware Shoals area is covered by the multi-county Greenwood County District 51. A portion of the county is in the Greenville County School District.

There are two public high schools in the county: Laurens (in Dist. 55) and Clinton (in Dist. 56).

Public K-12 education includes M. S. Bailey Child Development Center, Clinton Elementary, Eastside Elementary, E.B. Morse Elementary, Ford Elementary, Hickory Tavern Elementary, Joanna-Woodson Elementary, Gray Court-Owings Elementary & Middle, Clinton Middle, Hickory Tavern Middle, Laurens Middle, Sanders Middle, Clinton High, and Laurens District 55 High.

Private K-12 education includes Laurens Academy, Summit Classical Charter School, and Thornwell Charter School.

Presbyterian College, located in Clinton, is a four-year liberal-arts school founded in 1880.

== Communities ==
=== Cities ===
- Clinton
- Fountain Inn (mostly in Greenville County)
- Laurens (county seat and largest community)

=== Towns ===
- Cross Hill
- Gray Court
- Ware Shoals (mostly in Greenwood County; partly in Abbeville County)
- Waterloo

=== Census-designated places ===
- Joanna
- Mountville
- Princeton
- Watts Mills

=== Unincorporated communities ===
- Barksdale
- Hickory Tavern
- Kinards (partly in Newberry County)
- Madden
- Owings

== Notable people ==
- James Adair, (c. 1709–1783), historian and resided in Laurens County in later life
- Andrew Johnson, 17th president of the United States, worked as a tailor in Laurens during the 1820s
- William Dunlap Simpson, 78th governor of South Carolina and chief justice of the South Carolina Supreme Court from 1880 to 1890
- Pat Cannon, former representative for Florida's 4th congressional district

== See also ==
- List of counties in South Carolina
- National Register of Historic Places listings in Laurens County, South Carolina
