= Cross Hill, South Carolina =

- Town
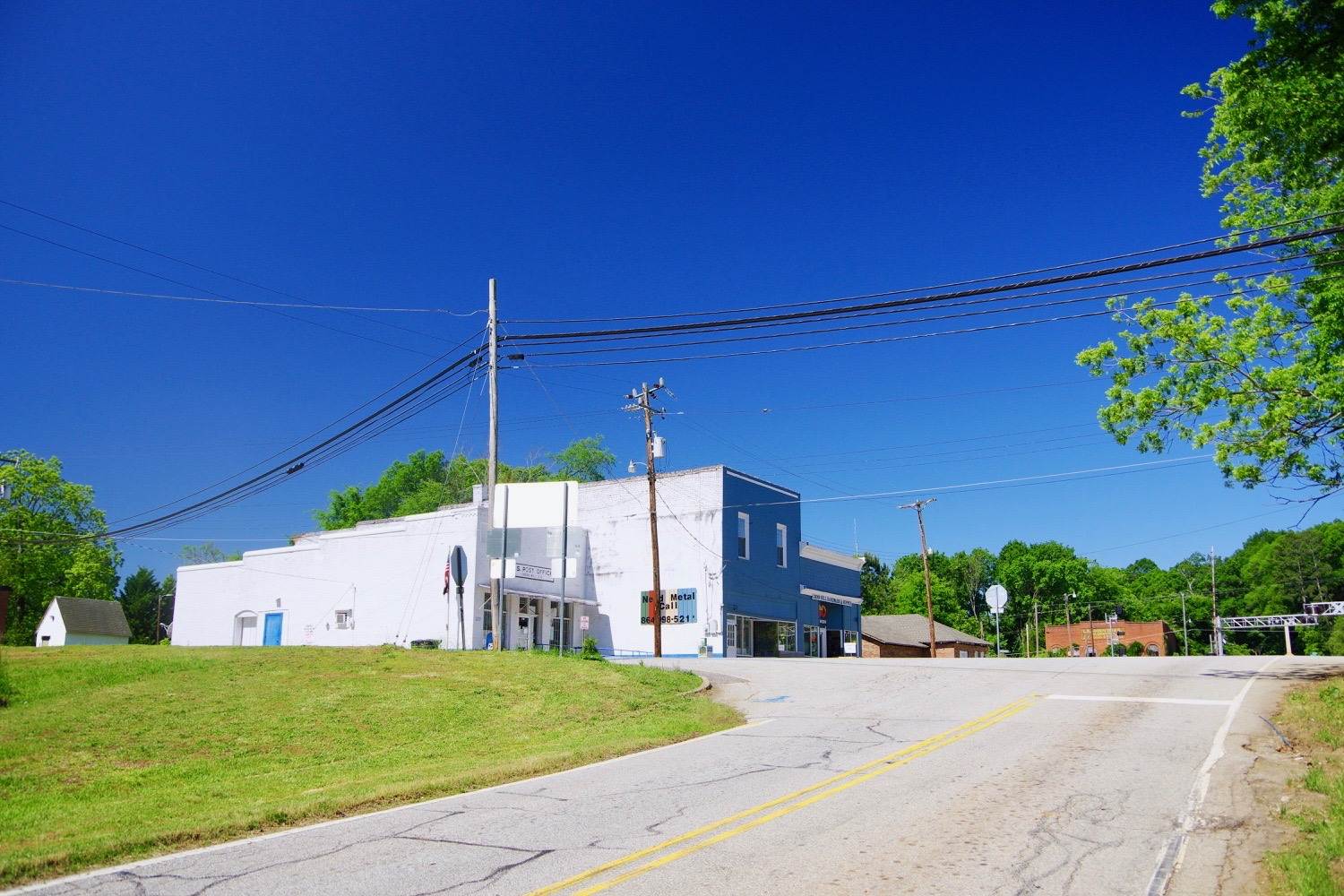
- Main Street (SC 39)

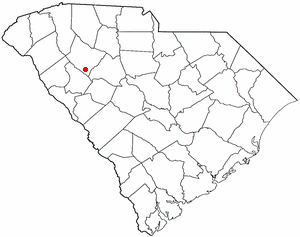
- Location of Cross Hill, South Carolina
- Coordinates: 34°18′16″N 82°00′01″W
- Country: United States
- State: South Carolina
- County: Laurens

Area
  - Total: 3.19 sq mi (8.25 km^{2})
  - Land: 3.19 sq mi (8.25 km^{2})
  - Water: 0 sq mi (0.00 km^{2})
- Elevation: 581 ft (177 m)

Population (2020)
  - Total: 404
  - Density: 126.8/sq mi (48.97/km^{2})
- Time zone: UTC-5 (Eastern (EST))
  - Summer (DST): UTC-4 (EDT)
- ZIP code: 29332
- Area codes: 864, 821
- FIPS code: 45-17890
- GNIS feature ID: 2406339
- Website: https://www.townofcrosshill.org/

Cross Hill is a town in Laurens County, South Carolina, United States. As of the 2020 census, Cross Hill had a population of 404. It is part of the Greenville–Mauldin–Easley Metropolitan Statistical Area.

== History ==
Cross Hill developed around the intersection of two old Indian trails. The Carter family constructed an inn at the intersection of these two trails in 1795. By 1837, the community that developed around the inn was known as "Cross Hill." The town expanded with the arrival of the Georgia, Carolina and Northern Railway in 1890, and officially incorporated that same year.

== Geography ==
Cross Hill is concentrated around the intersection of South Carolina Highway 39 and South Carolina Highway 560, northeast of Greenwood. Lake Greenwood lies just to the west. South Carolina Highway 72 passes through the town's northern outskirts.

According to the United States Census Bureau, the town has a total area of 3.1 square miles (8.0 km^{2}), all land.

== Demographics ==
Historical population
Census	Pop.	Note	%±
1880	149		—
1890	216		45.0%
1900	459		112.5%
1910	558		21.6%
1920	587		5.2%
1930	678		15.5%
1940	525		−22.6%
1950	543		3.4%
1960	441		−18.8%
1970	579		31.3%
1980	604		4.3%
1990	469		−22.4%
2000	601		28.1%
2010	507		−15.6%
2020	404		−20.3%
U.S. Decennial Census

=== 2020 census ===
Cross Hill town, South Carolina – Racial and ethnic composition Note: the US Census treats Hispanic/Latino as an ethnic category. This table excludes Latinos from the racial categories and assigns them to a separate category. Hispanics/Latinos may be of any race.
Race / Ethnicity (NH = Non-Hispanic)	Pop 2000	Pop 2010	Pop 2020	% 2000	% 2010	% 2020
White alone (NH)	256	191	165	42.60%	37.67%	40.84%
Black or African American alone (NH)	333	299	213	55.41%	58.97%	52.72%
Native American or Alaska Native alone (NH)	2	0	1	0.33%	0.00%	0.25%
Asian alone (NH)	3	1	2	0.50%	0.20%	0.50%
Native Hawaiian or Pacific Islander alone (NH)	0	0	0	0.00%	0.00%	0.00%
Other race alone (NH)	0	0	1	0.00%	0.00%	0.25%
Mixed race or Multiracial (NH)	6	6	11	1.00%	1.18%	2.72%
Hispanic or Latino (any race)	1	10	11	0.17%	1.97%	2.72%
Total	601	507	404	100.00%	100.00%	100.00%

=== 2000 census ===
As of the census of 2000, there were 601 people, 224 households, and 165 families residing in the town. The population density was 194.5 inhabitants per square mile (75.1/km^{2}). There were 245 housing units at an average density of 79.3 per square mile (30.6/km^{2}). The racial makeup of the town was 55.57% African American, 42.60% White, 0.50% Asian, 0.33% Native American, and 1.00% from two or more races. Hispanic or Latino of any race were 0.17% of the population.

There were 224 households, out of which 36.2% had children under the age of 18 living with them, 41.1% were married couples living together, 24.1% had a female householder with no husband present, and 26.3% were non-families. 23.2% of all households were made up of individuals, and 8.9% had someone living alone who was 65 years of age or older. The average household size was 2.68 and the average family size was 3.16.

In the town, the population was spread out, with 29.0% under the age of 18, 8.2% from 18 to 24, 29.5% from 25 to 44, 23.1% from 45 to 64, and 10.3% who were 65 years of age or older. The median age was 35 years. For every 100 females, there were 101.7 males. For every 100 females age 18 and over, there were 92.3 males.

The median income for a household in the town was $28,083, and the median income for a family was $32,500. Males had a median income of $25,288 versus $18,846 for females. The per capita income for the town was $12,688. About 16.0% of families and 19.8% of the population were below the poverty line, including 23.8% of those under age 18 and 18.5% of those age 65 or over.

== Education ==
It is in the Laurens School District 56. The district's comprehensive high school is Clinton High School.
