= Whitmire, South Carolina =

- Town
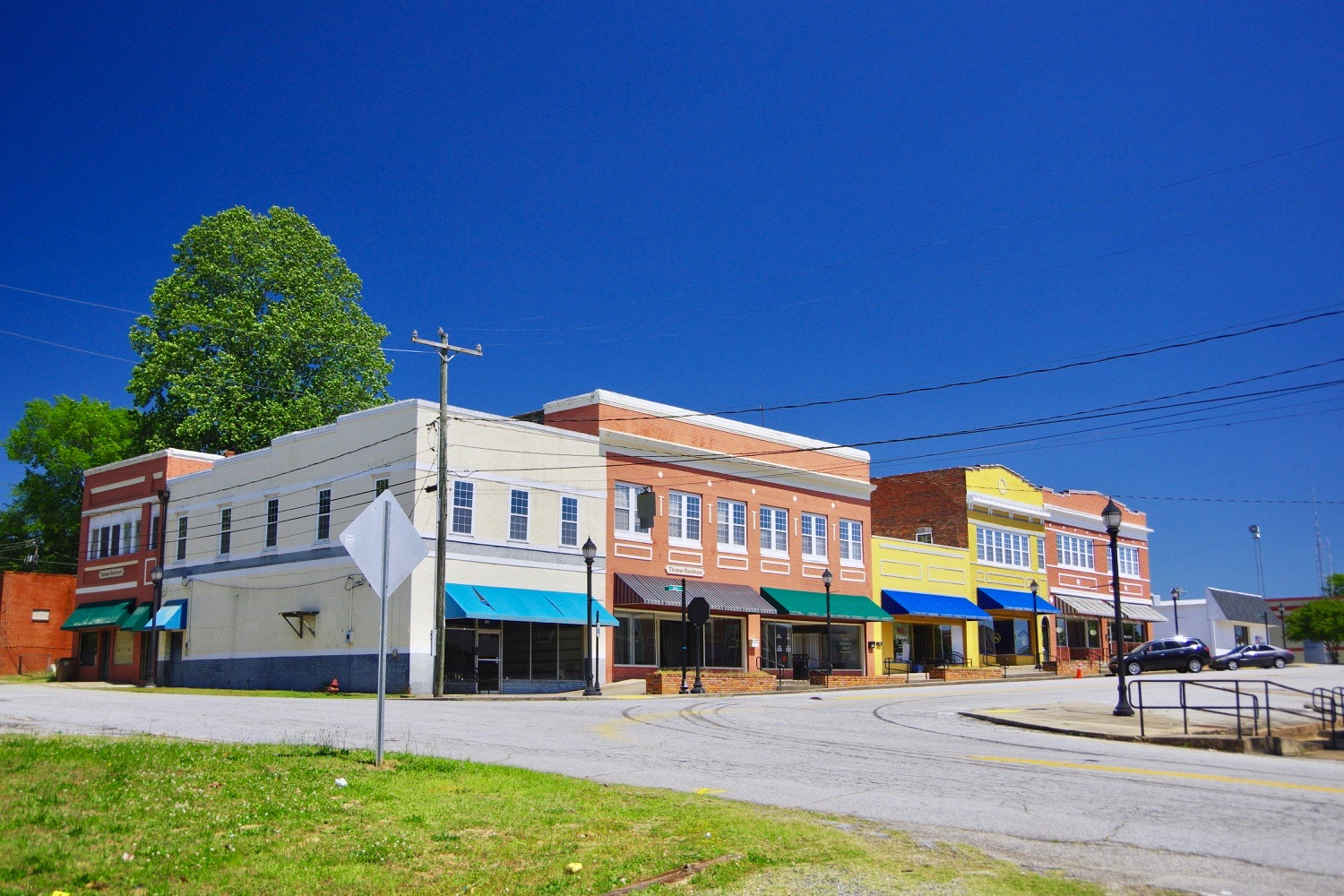
- Businesses along Main Street
- Nickname: Pearl of the Piedmont
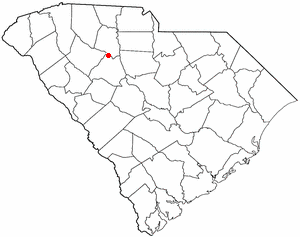
- Location of Whitmire, South Carolina
- Coordinates: 34°30′8″N 81°36′51″W
- Country: United States
- State: South Carolina
- County: Newberry

Government
  - Mayor: Billy Hollingsworth

Area
  - Total: 1.25 sq mi (3.24 km^{2})
  - Land: 1.25 sq mi (3.24 km^{2})
  - Water: 0 sq mi (0.00 km^{2})
- Elevation: 436 ft (133 m)

Population (2020)
  - Total: 1,390
  - Density: 1,112.1/sq mi (429.38/km^{2})
- Time zone: UTC-5 (Eastern (EST))
  - Summer (DST): UTC-4 (EDT)
- ZIP code: 29178
- Area codes: 803, 839
- FIPS code: 45-77380
- GNIS feature ID: 1251440
- Website: townofwhitmire.godaddysites.com

Whitmire is a town in Newberry County, South Carolina, United States, along the Enoree River. The population was 1,390 at the 2020 census. The town was named for George Fredrick Whitmire, who came from Stuttgart, Germany.

== History ==
The earliest settler in what is now Whitmire was John Duncan, who built a house along the creek that now bears his name. The George Frederick Whitmire family arrived prior to the 1790s (1790 Census) and established a tavern and post office. The arrival of the Georgia, Carolina and Northern Railway in 1890 led to the town's rapid growth. Whitmire incorporated in 1891.

In 1902, William Coleman and several associates established a large textile factory known as the Glenn-Lowery Mill, which included 900 looms and 33,000 spindles. By 1911, the mill had nearly doubled in size. Later owners continued to expand the mill, and it would remain a major source of revenue for Whitmire throughout the 20th century.

A fire in 1916 destroyed much of downtown Whitmire, which consisted primarily of wooden buildings. The town passed a series of new fire ordinances, and the business district was rebuilt with brick. Many of these buildings are still standing.

In 1924, Whitmire attempted to "secede" from Newberry County and form a new county known as Carlisle County. The new county would have consisted of parts of Newberry County, Laurens County, and Union County, with Whitmire as the county seat. The county's organizers failed to acquire the necessary amount of land, however, and the initiative failed.

A collage of historic photos of the town of Whitmire found at the lobby of the Whitmire Town Hall in Whitmire, South Carolina

== Geography ==
Whitmire is located at 34°30′8″N 81°36′51″W (34.502227, -81.614162). The town is concentrated around the intersection of U.S. Route 176 and South Carolina Highway 72, northwest of Columbia and southeast of Spartanburg. The town's eastern boundary lies along the Enoree River.

According to the United States Census Bureau, the town has a total area of 1.3 square miles (3.3 km^{2}), all land.

== Demographics ==
Historical population
Census	Pop.	Note	%±
1900	131		—
1910	1,045		697.7%
1920	1,955		87.1%
1930	2,763		41.3%
1940	3,272		18.4%
1950	3,006		−8.1%
1960	2,663		−11.4%
1970	2,226		−16.4%
1980	2,038		−8.4%
1990	1,702		−16.5%
2000	1,512		−11.2%
2010	1,441		−4.7%
2020	1,390		−3.5%
U.S. Decennial Census

As of the census of 2010, there were 1,441 people, 597 households, and 382 families residing in the town. The population density was 1,147.0 people per square mile. There were 760 housing units at an average density of 617.4 per square mile (238.4/km^{2}). The racial makeup of the town was 78.51% White, 20.50% African American, 0.07% Native American, 0.07% Asian, 0.07% Pacific Islander, 0.26% from other races, and 0.53% from two or more races. Hispanic or Latino of any race were 0.53% of the population.

There were 650 households, out of which 25.7% had children under the age of 18 living with them, 40.3% were married couples living together, 16.2% had a female householder with no husband present, and 37.7% were non-families. 34.5% of all households were made up of individuals, and 23.5% had someone living alone who was 65 years of age or older. The average household size was 2.30 and the average family size was 2.94.

In the town, the population was spread out, with 23.7% under the age of 18, 6.4% from 18 to 24, 22.7% from 25 to 44, 22.7% from 45 to 64, and 24.5% who were 65 years of age or older. The median age was 43 years. For every 100 females, there were 82.2 males. For every 100 females age 18 and over, there were 78.9 males.

The median income for a household in the town was $22,007, and the median income for a family was $30,833. Males had a median income of $27,500 versus $18,258 for females. The per capita income for the town was $13,429. About 16.3% of families and 18.7% of the population were below the poverty line, including 22.5% of those under age 18 and 15.1% of those age 65 or over.

== Economy ==
Whitmire earned the title "Pearl of the Piedmont" for its status as a successful textile town, but by the early 2010s the last mill was closed.

== Education ==
Whitmire has a public library, a branch of the Newberry County Library System.

== Notable people ==
- Billy O'Dell, (1933–2018), was a professional baseball player known for his time with San Francisco Giants
- Donnie Shell, (b 1952) is a former professional Football player for the Pittsburgh Steelers.
