= List of Interstate Highways in South Carolina =

Interstate Highways of South Carolina
- Highway shields for I-26, I-385, and I-20 Bus. Spur
- Interstate Highways highlighted in red; future sections in blue; unbuilt sections in orange

System information
- Maintained by SCDOT
- Length: 862.60 mi (1,388.22 km)
- Formed: June 29, 1956

Highway names
- Interstates: Interstate XX (I-XX)
- Business Loop: Interstate XX Business Loop (I-XX Bus.)
- Business Spur: Interstate XX Business Spur (I-XX Bus.)

System links
- South Carolina State Highway System; Interstate; US; State; Scenic

There are 11 Interstate Highways—5 primary and 6 auxiliary—that exist entirely or partially in the U.S. state of South Carolina. As of December 31, 2013, the state had a total of 850.80 miles (1,369.23 km) of interstate and 11.80 miles (18.99 km) of interstate business, all maintained by the South Carolina Department of Transportation (SCDOT).

== Primary Interstates ==
Number	Length (mi)	Length (km)	Southern or western terminus	Northern or eastern terminus	Formed	Removed	Notes
I-20	141.51	227.74	I-20 at the GA state line	I-95 / I-20 Bus. in Florence	1964	current	
I-26	220.95	355.58	I-26 at the NC state line	US 17 in Charleston	1960	current	
I-73	—	—	US 17 in Briarcliffe Acres	Future I-73 at the NC state line	proposed	—	Future designation along SC 22
I-74	—	—	Future I-74 at the NC state line	US 17 in Garden City	proposed	—	Future designation along SC 31
I-77	91.05	146.53	I-26 in Cayce	I-77 / US 21 at the NC state line	1975	current	
I-85	106.28	171.04	I-85 at the GA state line	I-85 at the NC state line	1959	current	
I-95	198.76	319.87	I-95 at the GA state line	I-95 at the NC state line	1968	current	
Proposed and unbuilt

== Auxiliary Interstates ==
Number	Length (mi)	Length (km)	Southern or western terminus	Northern or eastern terminus	Formed	Removed	Notes
I-126	3.680	5.922	I-26 / US 76 in Columbia	US 21 / US 76 / US 176 / US 321 in Columbia	1961	current	
I-185	17.7	28.5	I-385 in Mauldin	US 29 in Greenville	1961	current	Toll road between I-385 and I-85.
I-326	5.24	8.43	I-26 in Cayce	SC 48 in Columbia	1976	1995	Was an unsigned designated route, replaced by I-77.
I-385	42.16	67.85	I-26 near Clinton	US 276 in Greenville	1962	current	
I-520	7.72	12.42	I-520 at the GA state line	I-20 in North Augusta	2004	current	
I-526	19.26	31.00	US 17 / SC 7 in Charleston	I-526 Bus. / US 17 in Mount Pleasant	1989	current	
I-585	2.25	3.62	US 176 / US 221 / SC 9 in Spartanburg	I-85 Bus. / US 176 near Spartanburg	1959	current	
Former

== Business routes ==
Number	Length (mi)	Length (km)	Southern or western terminus	Northern or eastern terminus	Formed	Removed	Notes
I-20 BS	2.110	3.396	I-20 / I-95 in Florence	US 76 Conn. / West Evans Street in Florence	1970	current	
I-85 BL	8.770	14.114	I-85 northwest of Fairforest	I-85 east of Valley Falls	1995	current	Freeway-grade business loop
I-126 BS	0.60	0.97	I-126 / US 21 / US 76 / US 176 / US 321 in Columbia	US 21 / US 76 / US 176 / US 321 in Columbia	1980	—	
I-385 BS	0.490	0.789	I-385 / US 276 in Greenville	US 29 / SC 183 in Greenville	1962	current	Unsigned business spur
I-526 BS	1.570	2.527	I-526 / US 17 in Mount Pleasant	SC 703 in Mount Pleasant	1992	current	
I-585 BS	1.60	2.57	US 29 / US 176 / SC 9 in Spartanburg	I-585 / US 176 / US 221 / SC 9 in Spartanburg	1959	—	
Former
