= South Carolina Highway 34 =

Highway in South Carolina, US

South Carolina Highway 34

- Route of SC 34 highlighted in red

Route information
- Maintained by SCDOT
- Length: 185.930 mi (299.225 km)
- Existed: 1911–present
- Tourist routes: SC Heritage Corridor: Discovery Route

Major junctions
- West end: US 25 Bus. / US 178 Bus. / SC 10 in Greenwood
- US 25 / US 178 / US 221 in Greenwood; US 76 in Newberry; I-26 in Newberry; I-77 near Ridgeway; US 21 in Ridgeway; US 1 / US 521 / US 601 in Camden; US 15 in Bishopville; US 52 / US 401 in Darlington; I-95 near Dillon
- East end: US 301 / US 501 / SC 9 / SC 57 in Dillon

Location
- Country: United States
- State: South Carolina
- Counties: Greenwood, Newberry, Fairfield, Kershaw, Lee, Darlington, Marlboro, Dillon

Highway system
- South Carolina State Highway System; Interstate; US; State; Scenic
← SC 33	→ SC 35

South Carolina Highway 34 (SC 34) is a 185.930-mile (299.225 km) primary state highway in the U.S. state of South Carolina. As one of the longer state highways, it traverses the state east–west from Greenwood to Dillon, connecting the cities of Newberry, Winnsboro, Camden, Bishopville and Darlington.

== Route description ==
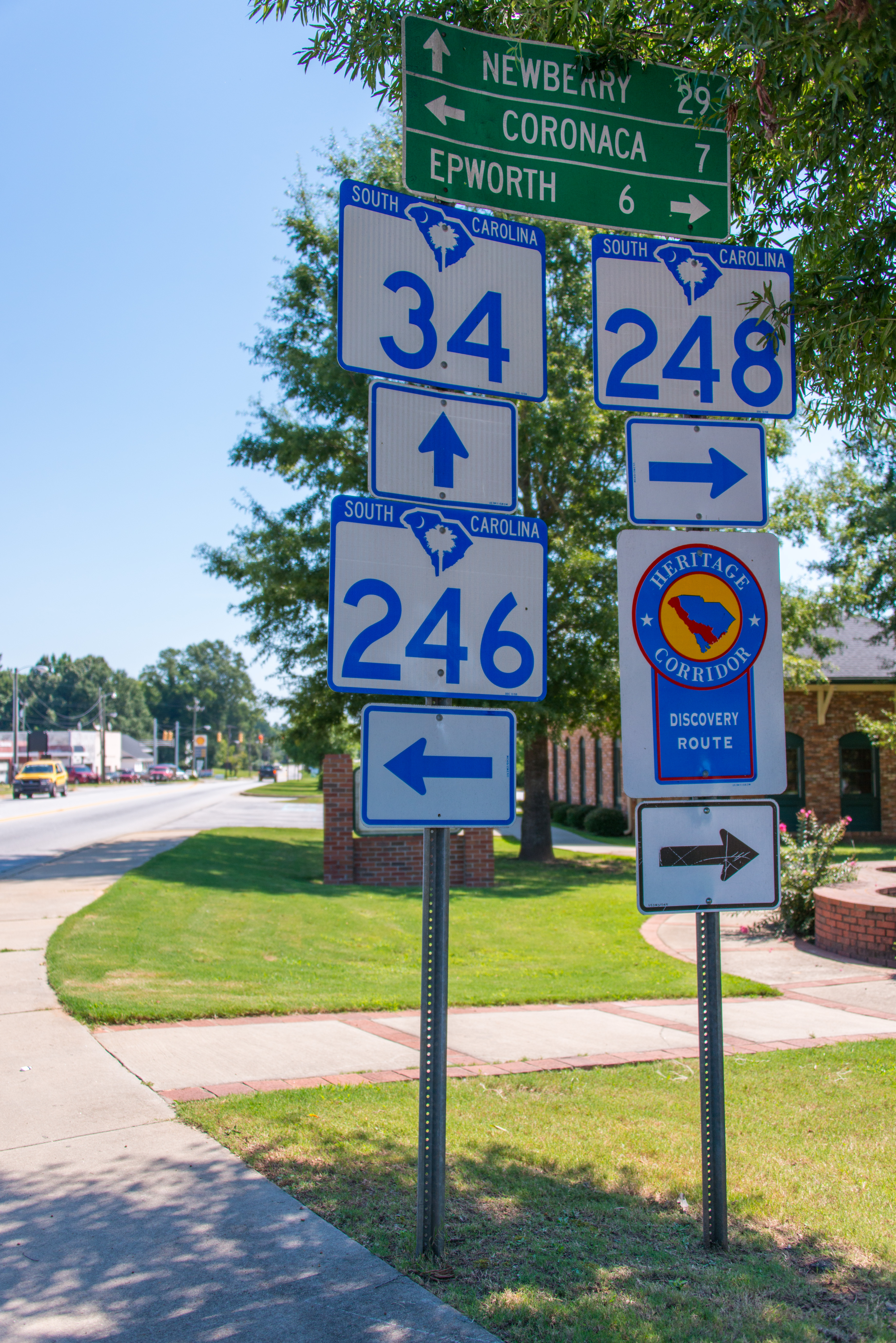
SC 34, SC 246 and SC 248 in Ninety Six

SC 34 begins as a hidden highway in downtown Greenwood, at the intersection of Main Street and Maxwell Avenue. On city and state official maps, SC 34 is on an east parallel to U.S. Route 25 Business (US 25 Bus.) and US 178 Bus. along Main Street with some sections being in concurrency; however, no signage identifies this unique relationship, thus the hidden status for 1.6 miles (2.6 km). At the intersection of Main Street and Ninety Six Highway, the first signage of SC 34 appears, heading east to Ninety Six.

SC 34 travels through the town of Ninety Six and near the Ninety Six National Historic Site, meeting SC 246 and SC 248. Near Newberry, it takes a bypass route along Dixie Drive and Wilson Road, before continuing east to Winnsboro. Now going southeast, it goes through Ridgeway, to Lugoff, where it overlaps with US 1/US 601 to Camden. Continuing east and parallel to Interstate 20 (I-20), SC 34 joins with US 15 at Bishopville and skirts north of Lee State Park. East of Lydia, SC 34 separates from US 15 and goes directly to Darlington. Heading in a northeasterly direction now, it goes through Brownsville then east into downtown Dillon, where it ends at the intersection of Main Street and Second Avenue.

== History ==
An original part of the South Carolina state route system, in 1922 the road ran from Darlington to Ridgeway. In 1933 the road was extended to Dillon and about 1943 a bridge over the Pee Dee river was opened. In September 1951 the road was extended to Greenwood, creating the current configuration. SC 34 was bypassed south around Newberry in 1976 and the original route through the town remained as SC 34 Business. The first part of the road to be paved was the section though Camden in 1929. Over the next several years other parts were paved until the road was fully paved by the early 1940s. During the past several decades, much of the route has been widened to four lanes.

=== South Carolina Highway 22 ===
South Carolina Highway 22
- Location: Ninety Six–Great Falls, South Carolina
- Existed: September 1951

South Carolina Highway 22 (SC 22) was an original state highway that was established on a path from Ninety Six to Newberry. In 1923, it was extended northeast and then east to SC 16 (now U.S. Route 321 (US 321)) in Winnsboro. By the end of 1924, it was extended west-southwest to SC 21 in Greenwood. This extension replaced part of SC 24. By the end of 1926, it was extended to the northeast to end at SC 97 in Great Falls. In September 1951, SC 22 was decommissioned, and most of its path was redesignated as SC 34.

==== Greenwood alternate route ====
South Carolina Highway 22 Alternate
- Location: Greenwood, South Carolina
- Existed: c.1940–1947

South Carolina Highway 22 Alternate (SC 22 Alt.) was an alternate route that was established around 1940. It traveled from SC 22 (now US 25 Bus./US 178 Bus.) to US 221/SC 72 in the central part of Greenwood. In 1947, it was decommissioned.

==== Great Falls alternate route ====
South Carolina Highway 22 Alternate
- Location: Great Falls, South Carolina
- Existed: c.1937–1947

South Carolina Highway 22 Alternate (SC 22 Alt.) was an alternate route that was established in either 1936 or 1937. It traveled on a loop in Great Falls. In 1947, it was decommissioned and downgraded to secondary roads.

=== South Carolina Highway 73 ===
South Carolina Highway 73
- Location: Brownsville–Dillon, South Carolina
- Existed: 1932–1939

South Carolina Highway 73 (SC 73) was a state highway that was established in 1932 on a path from a point approximately 6 miles (9.7 km) west of Dillon to SC 9 in Dillon. In May 1936, its western terminus was extended to SC 38 in Brownsville. In 1939, it was decommissioned and redesignated as part of SC 34.

== Major intersections ==
County	Location	mi	km	Destinations	Notes
Greenwood	Greenwood	0.000	0.000	US 25 Bus. / US 178 Bus. (Main Street) / SC 10 west – Edgefield, Saluda, Promised Land	Western terminus
Greenwood	Greenwood	1.280	2.060	US 25 / US 178 / US 221 – McCormick, Saluda, Anderson, Greenville	Interchange
Greenwood	Ninety Six	7.440	11.974	SC 246 north / SC 248 south – Coronaca, Epworth	Western end of SC 246 concurrency; to Ninety Six National Historic Site
Greenwood	Ninety Six	7.560	12.167	SC 246 south – Saluda	Eastern end of SC 246 concurrency
Greenwood		13.130	21.131	SC 702 – Saluda	To Greenwood State Park
Newberry	Chappells	17.570	28.276	SC 39 – Laurens, Saluda	
Newberry	Silverstreet	28.750	46.269	SC 121 south – Saluda	Western end of SC 121 concurrency
Newberry		33.280	53.559	SC 121 north (Kendall Road) to I-26 west – Whitmire	Eastern end of SC 121 concurrency
Newberry		34.100	54.879	Dixie Drive west (SC 34 Conn. west) to Boundary Street north north / SC 121 – Newberry, Whitmire	Eastern terminus of SC 34 Conn.; southern terminus of Boundary Street; SC 34 turns right.
Newberry	Newberry	35.180	56.617	SC 395 (Nance Street) to SC 194 – Newberry	
Newberry	Newberry	36.780	59.192	US 76 east (Wilson Road) – Prosperity	Western end of US 76 concurrency
Newberry	Newberry	37.500	60.350	SC 219 east (Main Street) – Pomaria	Western terminus of SC 219
Newberry	Newberry	37.680	60.640	US 76 west (Wilson Road) – Clinton	Eastern end of US 76 concurrency
Newberry	Newberry	39.978– 40.070	64.338– 64.486	I-26 – Columbia, Spartanburg	I-26 exit 74
Newberry		44.440	71.519	US 176 – Pomaria, Whitmire	
Fairfield		59.080	95.080	SC 215 – Monticello, Carlisle	
Fairfield	Winnsboro	71.520	115.100	US 321 north / SC 200 north – Chester, Great Falls	Western end of US 321 concurrency; southern terminus of SC 200
Fairfield	Winnsboro Mills	74.920	120.572	US 321 Bus. north / SC 213 west – Jenkinsville	Southern terminus of US 321 Bus.; eastern terminus of SC 213
Fairfield	Winnsboro Mills	75.160	120.958	US 321 south – Columbia	Eastern end of US 321 concurrency
Fairfield		81.450– 81.620	131.081– 131.355	I-77 – Columbia, Charlotte	I-77 exit 34
Fairfield		82.910	133.431	West Coleman Street east (US 21 Conn. south) to I-77 – Columbia	Northern terminus of US 21 Conn.; western terminus of West Coleman Street
Fairfield	Ridgeway	83.620	134.573	SC 34 Truck east (Thomas Street)	Western terminus of SC 34 Truck
Fairfield	Ridgeway	83.840	134.927	US 21 north (Palmer Street / SC 34 Truck west) – Great Falls, Charlotte; Church Street north – Longtown, Lake Wateree, Fairfield Home, Camp Longridge	Western end of US 21 concurrency; eastern terminus of SC 34 Truck
Fairfield	Ridgeway	84.060	135.281	US 21 south (Means Street) – Columbia	Eastern end of US 21 concurrency
Kershaw	Lugoff	101.880	163.960	US 1 south / US 601 south – Columbia, St. Matthews	Western end of US 1 and US 601 concurrencies
Kershaw	Lugoff–Camden line	103.903– 103.908	167.216– 167.224	Howard F. Speaks Bridge	Crossing over Wateree River
Kershaw	Camden	104.380	167.983	US 521 Truck north / US 601 Truck north (Springdale Drive) – Springdale Race Course, Steeplechase Museum, Camden Country Club	Western end of US 521 Truck concurrency; southern terminus of US 601 Truck
Kershaw	Camden	105.438	169.686	Senator Donald H. Don Holland Memorial Bridge over railroad tracks of CSX	
Kershaw	Camden	105.610	169.963	US 521 Truck south (Chestnut Ferry Road) – Camden High School, Larry Doby Park	Eastern end of US 521 Truck concurrency
Kershaw	Camden	106.650	171.637	US 521 / US 601 north (Broad Street) – Sumter, Kershaw	Eastern end of US 601 concurrency
Kershaw	Camden	107.110	172.377	US 521 Truck south (Mill Street / US 1 Truck south / SC 34 Truck west) – Alpha Center	Northern terminus of US 1 Truck and US 521 Truck; eastern terminus of SC 34 Truck
Kershaw	Camden	107.980	173.777	US 1 north – Bethune, Cheraw	Eastern end of US 1 concurrency; to Woodward Field
Lee		117.690	189.404	S-31-31 south to I-20	Northern terminus of S-31-31
Lee	Bishopville	128.580	206.929	US 15 south (Main Street) / SC 341 south (Church Street) – Sumter, Columbia, Lynchburg	Western end of US 15 and SC 341 concurrencies
Lee	Bishopville	129.970	209.166	SC 341 north (Bethune Highway) – Bethune	Eastern end of SC 341 concurrency
Darlington	Lees Crossroads	139.930	225.196	US 15 north (Fifth Street) / SC 403 (Oates Highway) – Hartsville, Timmonsville	Eastern end of US 15 concurrency
Darlington	Earlys Crossroads	146.020	234.996	SC 151 north (Bobo Newsom Highway) – Hartsville	Western end of SC 151 concurrency
Darlington	Darlington	151.280	243.462	US 52 / US 401 (Governor Williams Highway / SC 34 Truck east) to I-20 / I-95 – Cheraw, Florence, Myrtle Beach	Interchange; western terminus of SC 34 Truck
Darlington	Darlington	151.710	244.154	To US 401 / I-20 (34-401 Connector) – Sumter	Northern terminus of SC 34 Conn.; southern terminus of SC 151
Darlington	Darlington	152.070	244.733	SC 340 south (Washington Street) – Timmonsville	Northern terminus of SC 340
Darlington	Darlington	152.680	245.715	US 52 Bus. (Main Street) – Cheraw, Bennettsville, Florence	Eastern end of SC 151 concurrency; southern terminus of SC 151
Darlington	Mechanicsville	160.180	257.785	Charleston Road (SC 34 Truck west) to US 52 – Florence, Great Pee Dee HP/WMA	Eastern terminus of SC 34 Truck
Marlboro	Brownsville	170.180	273.878	SC 38 – Bennettsville, Marion	
Dillon		175.350– 175.479	282.198– 282.406	I-95 – Florence, Fayetteville	I-95 exit 190
Dillon	Dillon	185.930	299.225	US 301 / US 501 / SC 9 / SC 57 – Florence, Lake View, Fayetteville, Bennettsville	Eastern terminus
1.000 mi = 1.609 km; 1.000 km = 0.621 mi: Concurrency terminus

== Special routes ==
=== Newberry business loop ===
South Carolina Highway 34 Business
- Location: Newberry, South Carolina
- Length: 2.6 mi (4.2 km)
- Existed: 1976–2005

South Carolina Highway 34 Business (SC 34 Bus.) was established in 1976, following the old mainline route through downtown Newberry, via Boundary Street, College Street, and Main Street. In 2005 the route was decommissioned.

=== Newberry connector ===
South Carolina Highway 34 Connector
- Location: Newberry, South Carolina
- Length: 0.590 mi (950 m)

South Carolina Highway 34 Connector (SC 34 Conn.) is an unsigned connector route southwest of downtown Newberry. It travels along Dixie Drive for 0.590 miles (0.950 km) between Kendall Street (SC 121) and SC 34.

=== Ridgeway truck route ===
South Carolina Highway 34 Truck
- Location: Ridgeway, South Carolina
- Length: 0.3 mi (480 m)

South Carolina Highway 34 Truck (SC 34 Truck) is a 0.3-mile (0.48 km) truck route in the town of Ridgeway. It utilizes Thomas Street and part of U.S. Route 21 (US 21) to bypass part of the town. It begins at an intersection with the SC 34 mainline (Dogwood Drive in the northwestern part of the town. It takes Thomas Street to the northeast. Immediately, it crosses some railroad tracks of Norfolk Southern Railway. A short distance later, it intersects US 21. Here, it turns right and follows that highway to the southeast. The two highways travel through a residential area and then intersect the SC 34 mainline again.

The entire route is in Ridgeway, Fairfield County.

mi	km	Destinations	Notes
0.0	0.0	SC 34 (Dogwood Drive)	Western terminus
0.1	0.16	US 21 north – Great Falls, Charlotte	Western end of US 21 concurrency
0.3	0.48	Church Street north – Longtown, Lake Wateree, Fairfield Home, Camp Longridge US 21 south / SC 34 east (South Palmer Street) – Camden, Columbia SC 34 west (Church Street south) – Winnsboro	Eastern end of US 21 concurrency; eastern terminus
1.000 mi = 1.609 km; 1.000 km = 0.621 mi: Concurrency terminus

=== Camden truck route ===
South Carolina Highway 34 Truck
- Location: Camden, South Carolina
- Length: 0.830 mi (1,336 m)

South Carolina Highway 34 Truck (SC 34 Truck) is a 0.830-mile (1.336 km) truck route of SC 34 that exists entirely within the southern part of Camden. It uses York Street and Mill Street to connect U.S. Route 521 (US 521; Broad Street) with US 1/SC 34 (East Dekalb Street). It is entirely concurrent with US 521 Truck. The southbound lanes are also part of US 1 Truck, with no indication of US 1 Truck or SC 34 Truck; the northbound lanes have no indication of US 521 Truck.

=== Darlington truck route ===
South Carolina Highway 34 Truck
- Location: Darlington, South Carolina
- Length: 13.510 mi (21.742 km)

South Carolina Highway 34 Truck (SC 34 Truck) is a 13.510-mile-long (21.742 km) truck route that is partially within the city limits of Darlington, which is in the southeastern part of Darlington County. It has concurrencies with U.S. Route 52 and US 401.

The truck route begins at the northern end of the exit ramp from SC 34/SC 151 (Harry Byrd Highway) to US 52/US 401 (Governor Williams Highway). This interchange is just east of Darlington Raceway. This ramp heads to the south-southeast and crosses over Indian Creek before merging into US 52/US 401. The three highways travel to the southeast and have an intersection with Lamar Highway. At this intersection, US 401 splits off to the southwest, while US 52 and SC 34 Truck continue to the southeast. This intersection is also the western terminus of SC 34 Connector (SC 34 Conn.), which takes Lamar Highway to the northeast. They begin a curve to the east-southeast and pass Brockington Elementary School. They have an intersection with SC 340 (known as Timmonsville Highway south of this intersection and Washington Street north of it). They travel through rural areas of the southern part of the city. Then they temporarily leave the city limits of the city and cross over some railroad tracks of the Carolina Piedmont Railroad and Limit Street.

During the brief re-entering of Darlington, they intersect US 52 Bus. (South Main Street north). At this intersection, US 52 turns right and takes South Main Street tot the south-southeast, while SC 34 Truck continues to the east-southeast. The highway leaves Darlington and curves to the east. It crosses over some railroad tracks of South Carolina Central Railroad (SCRF) and then curves to the southeast. It crosses over the SCRF rail line again before intersecting South Charleston Road. Here, SC 34 Truck turns left and travels to the north-northwest. It curves to the north-northeast and crosses over Black Creek on the Williamson's Bridge. It travels through Howards Crossroads and then crosses over Back Swamp. After crossing over Alligator Creek, it curves to the north-northwest and enters Mechanicsville. Here, the truck route reaches its eastern terminus, an intersection with SC 34. Here, the roadway continues as North Charleston Road.

The entire route is in Darlington County.

Location	mi	km	Destinations	Notes
Darlington	0.000	0.000	US 52 north / US 401 north (Governor Williams Highway west) / SC 34 / SC 151 (Harry Byrd Highway west / Pearl Street east) – Cheraw, Hartsville, Charlotte, Darlington Raceway and Museum	Western end of US 52 and US 401 concurrencies; western terminus; interchange
Darlington	0.280	0.451	US 401 south (Lamar Highway south) to I-20 – Sumter; Lamar Highway north (SC 34 Conn. east) – Darlington	Eastern end of US 401 concurrency; western terminus of SC 34 Conn.
Darlington	0.930	1.497	SC 340 (Timmonsville Highway south / Washington Street north) to I-20 – Timmonsville, Darlington	
Darlington	2.330	3.750	US 52 south (South Main Street south) – Florence US 52 Bus. north (South Main Street north) – Darlington	Eastern end of US 52 concurrency; southern terminus of US 52 Bus.
	7.887	12.693	Williamson's Bridge	Crossing over Black Creek
Mechanicsville	13.510	21.742	SC 34 (Cashua Ferry Road) / North Charleston Road north – Great Pee Dee HP / WMA	Eastern terminus; roadway continues as North Charleston Road.
1.000 mi = 1.609 km; 1.000 km = 0.621 mi: Concurrency terminus

=== Darlington connector ===
South Carolina Highway 34 Connector
- Location: Darlington, South Carolina
- Length: 0.300 mi (483 m)

SC 34 Connector (SC 34 Conn.) is a 0.300-mile-long (0.483 km) connector route southwest of downtown Darlington. The highway is named Lamar Highway and connects U.S. Route 401 (US 401), at its intersection with US 52, with SC 34/SC 151. Though it is not signed with a typical auxiliary signage plate and SC 34 shield, green highway signs at both ends denote the road as the "34–401 Connector."

It begins at an intersection with US 52, US 401, and SC 34 Truck in the extreme southwestern part of Darlington, which is in the southeastern part of Darlington County. It travels to the northeast. An intersection with Hart Street provides access to SC 34 west and SC 151. The highway continues to the northeast until it reaches its eastern terminus, an intersection with SC 34 and SC 151.

The entire route is in Darlington, Darlington County.

mi	km	Destinations	Notes
0.000	0.000	US 52 south / SC 34 Truck east (Governor Williams Highway east) – Florence US 401 south (Lamar Highway south) – Sumter US 52 north / US 401 north / SC 34 Truck west (Governor Williams Highway west) – Bennettsville, Cheraw	Western terminus
0.140	0.225	Hart Street to SC 34 west / SC 151	
0.300	0.483	SC 34 east (Pearl Street / SC 151)	Eastern terminus
1.000 mi = 1.609 km; 1.000 km = 0.621 mi
