= Special routes of U.S. Route 221 =

Special routes of U.S. Route 221

Highway system
- United States Numbered Highway System; List; Special; Divided

Several special routes of U.S. Route 221 exist. In order from south to north they are as follows.

== Existing ==
=== Perry truck route ===
U.S. Highway 221 Truck
- Location: Perry, Florida
- Length: 5.2 mi (8.4 km)

U.S. Route 221 Truck (US 221 Truck) directs truck drivers, that are passing through, to follow US 19 going northwest of Perry, then crosses back to US 221 via County Road 359A.

=== Hazlehurst truck route ===
U.S. Highway 221 Truck
- Location: Hazlehurst, Georgia
- Length: 2.0 mi (3.2 km)

U.S. Route 221 Truck (US 221 Truck) is a truck route that directs truck drivers away from the local streets of Hazlehurst, Georgia, including the one-way pair section of US 221 and Georgia State Route 135 (SR 135). It begins on East Jefferson Street from US 221/SR 135. It is concurrent with SR 135 Connector (SR 135 Conn.). When SR 135 Conn. ends at US 23/SR 19, US 221 Truck/SR 135 Truck turn left onto the US 23/SR 19 concurrency known as Larry Contos Boulevard, and then turns left onto US 341/SR 27 (Golden Isles Parkway) eventually terminating at northbound US 221. The highway is entirely concurrent with SR 135 Truck.

=== Laurens truck route ===
U.S. Highway 221 Truck
- Location: Laurens, South Carolina
- Length: 5.440 mi (8.755 km)

U.S. Route 221 Truck (US 221 Truck) is a 5.440-mile (8.755 km) truck route partially within the eastern part of Laurens. It directs truck drivers away from the local streets of Laurens, along the entire length of SC 127 and part of US 76.

=== Chesnee–Rutherfordton alternate route ===
U.S. Highway 221 Alternate
- Location: Chesnee–State Line, South Carolina
- Length: 26.2 mi (42.2 km)
- Existed: 1941–present

U.S. Highway 221A
- Location: State Line, SC–Rutherfordton, NC

U.S. Route 221 Alternate (US 221A) is a 26.2-mile (42.2 km) alternate route that travels from Chesnee, South Carolina to Rutherfordton, North Carolina, via State Line, South Carolina, Cliffside, North Carolina, Henrietta, North Carolina, Caroleen, North Carolina, Alexander Mills, North Carolina, Forest City, North Carolina, and Spindale, North Carolina. It was established in 1941 when mainline US 221 was realigned further west along a straight route between Chesnee and Rutherfordton. In 1971, US 221 Alt. alignment was adjusted in Cliffside. In South Carolina, it has an alternate plate above the shield, while in North Carolina an "A" is affixed in the shield.

=== Chesnee connector route ===
U.S. Highway 221 Connector
- Location: Chesnee, South Carolina
- Length: 0.490 mi (789 m)

U.S. Route 221 Connector (US 221 Conn.) is a connector route of US 221 that exists just east of Chesnee. It serves to connect US 221 Alt./SC 11 (East Cherokee Street) with US 221. It is known as North Pickens Street and is an unsigned highway.

=== Marion business loop ===
U.S. Highway 221 Business
- Location: Marion, North Carolina
- Length: 5.0 mi (8.0 km)
- Existed: 1991–present

U.S. Route 221 Business (US 221 Bus), established in 1991, is a 5-mile (8.0 km) business loop through downtown Marion, via Main Street. It follows the old US 221 alignment before it was rerouted onto Marion Bypass, located west of the city. It also shares a partial overlap with US 70 north of the city center area.

=== Linville–Boone truck route ===
U.S. Highway 221 Truck
- Location: Linville–Boone, NC
- Length: 16.9 mi (27.2 km)

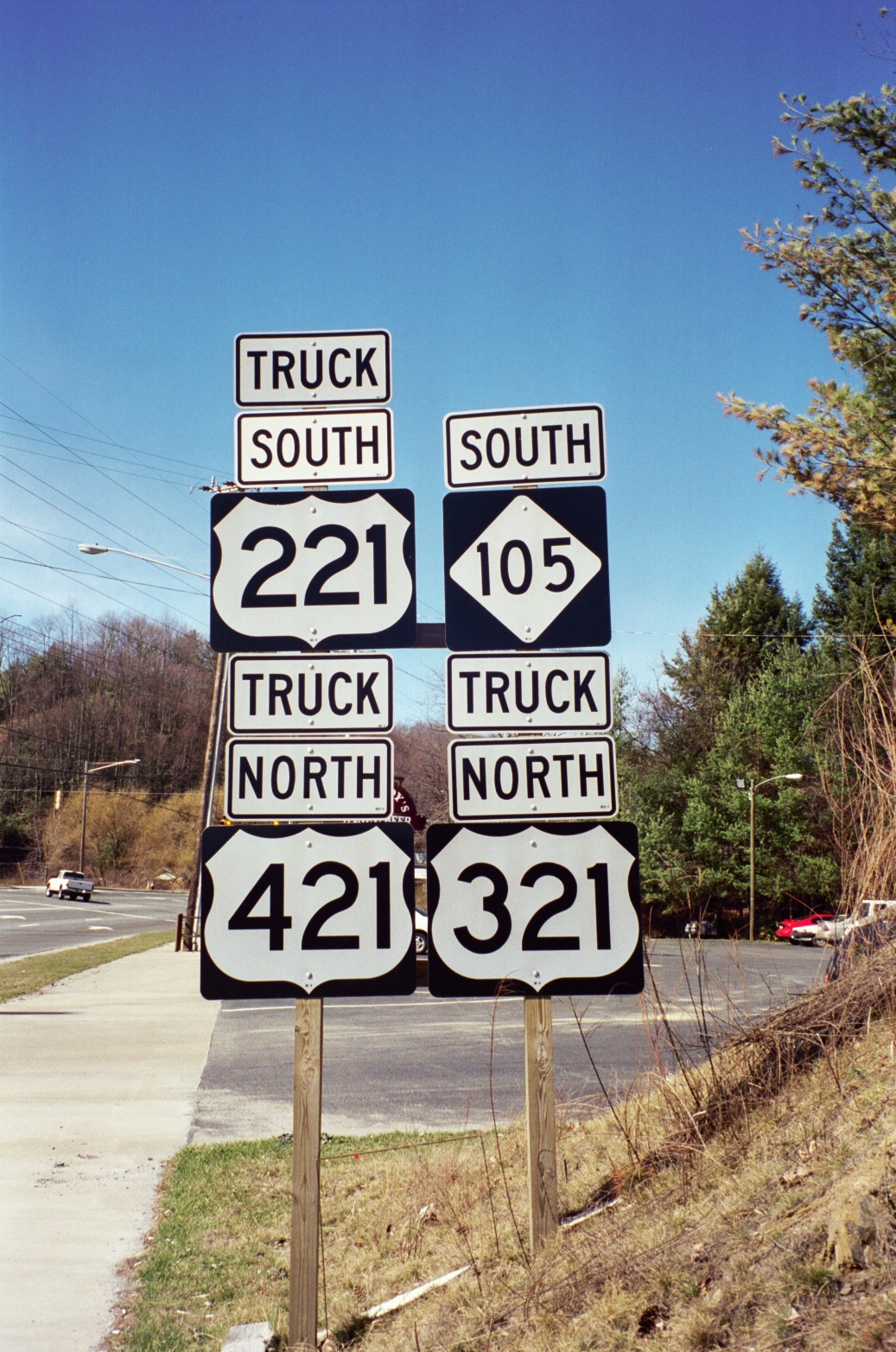
Overlapping US 221, 321, and 421 Truck routes along NC 105, in Boone

U.S. Route 221 Truck (US 221 Truck) provides an alternate route for truck drivers between Linville and Boone, via NC 105. It avoids an 18-mile (29 km) drive of endless curves and constant elevation changes along a stretch of US 221 between Linville and Blowing Rock, dubbed the Little Parkway Scenic Byway. In Boone, the truck route overlaps with US 321 Truck and US 421 Truck.

=== Jefferson business loop ===
U.S. Highway 221 Business
- Location: West Jefferson–Jefferson, NC
- Length: 4.4 mi (7.1 km)
- Existed: 1981–present

U.S. Route 221 Business (US 221 Bus), established in November, 1981, is a 4.4-mile (7.1 km) business loop through West Jefferson (via Jefferson Avenue and Second Street) and Jefferson (via Main Street). Sharing partial overlaps with NC 194 and NC 88, it follows the original US 221 alignment before it was rerouted onto new bypass route east of the towns in September, 1981.

=== Bedford business loop ===
U.S. Route 221 Business
- Location: Bedford, Virginia
- Length: 2.9 mi (4.7 km)
- Existed: 1999–present

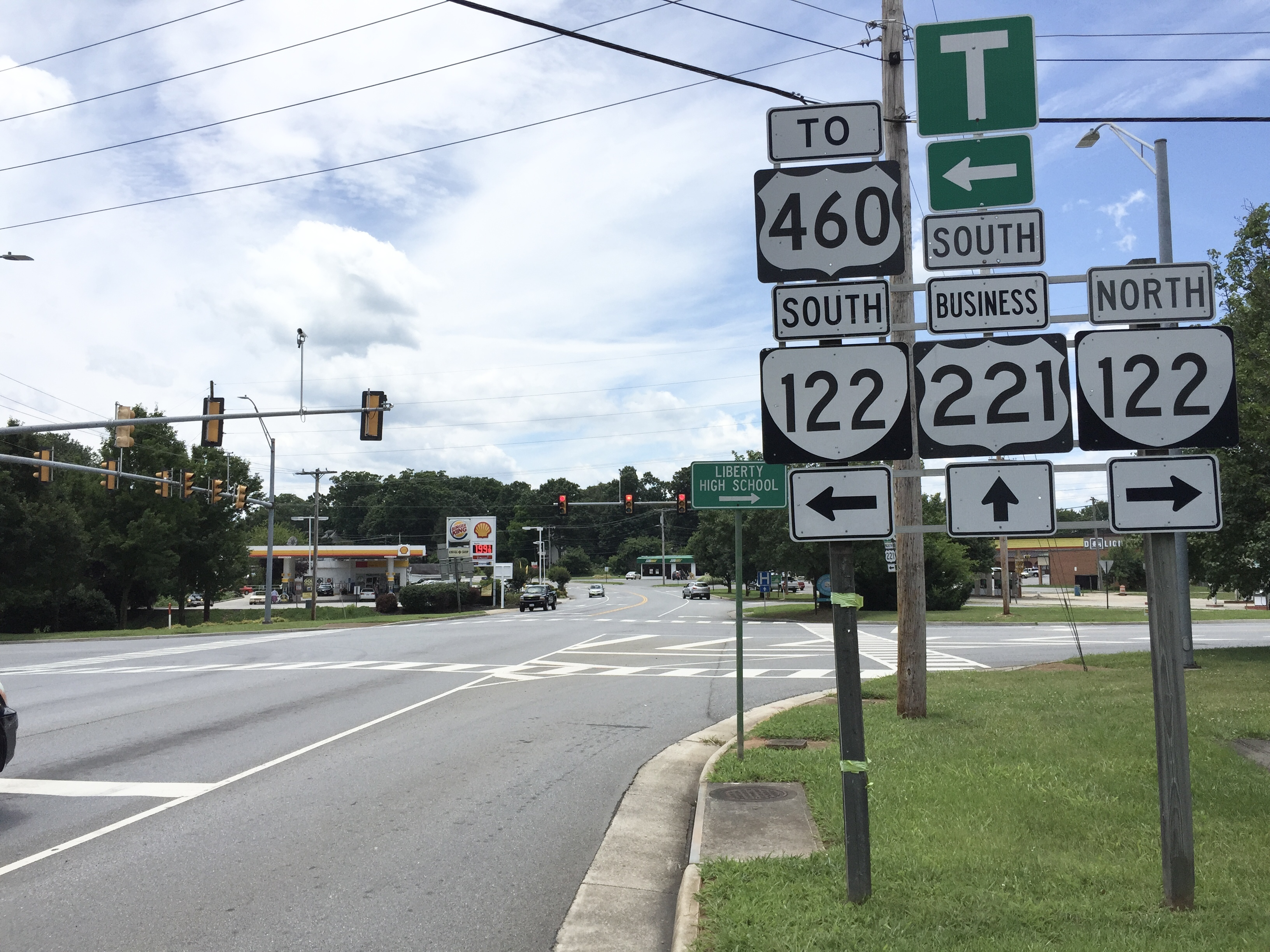
US 221 Bus. southbound at US 221 and SR 122 in Bedford

U.S. Route 221 Business (US 221 Bus), established in 1999, this 2.9 miles (4.7 km) route follows the old mainline US 221 through the town of Bedford.

== Decommissioned ==
U.S. Highway 221 Business
- Location: Greenwood, South Carolina
- Length: 4.7 mi (7.6 km)
- Existed: 1969–1988

=== Greenwood business loop ===
U.S. Route 221 Business (US 221 Bus.) was established in 1969, marking the former routing of US 221 through Greenwood before being moved onto the bypass with US 25/US 178. It was decommissioned in 1988, but some maps have shown it up until 2005.

County	Location	mi	km	Destinations	Notes
Greenwood	Greenwood	0.000	0.000	US 25 / US 178 / US 221 / SC 72 / SC 72 Bus. ends – Laurens, Clinton, Greenville, Anderson	Northern terminus; eastern terminus of SC 72 Bus.; eastern end of SC 72 Bus. concurrency
Greenwood	Greenwood	1.2	1.9	SC 254 west – Cokesbury	Eastern terminus of SC 254
Greenwood	Greenwood	1.6	2.6	US 25 Bus. / US 178 Bus. / SC 72 Bus. – Greenville, Anderson, Abbeville	Western end of SC 72 Bus. concurrency; northern end of US 25 Bus./US 178 Bus. concurrency
Greenwood	Greenwood	2.0	3.2	SC 34 begins / SC 10 west – Promised Land, McCormick	Western terminus of SC 34; Western end of SC 34 Concurrency (unsigned concurrency); SC 10 unsigned here
Greenwood	Greenwood	3.6	5.8	SC 34 east – Ninety Six	Eastern end of SC 34 Concurrency (SC 34 signage begins)
Greenwood	Greenwood	4.7	7.6	US 25 / US 178 / US 221 / US 25 Bus. ends / US 178 Bus. ends – Edgefield, Saluda, McCormick	Southern terminus; southern end of US 25 Bus./US 178 Bus. concurrency
Greenwood	Greenwood	1.000 mi = 1.609 km; 1.000 km = 0.621 mi: Concurrency terminus			
