= South Carolina Highway 702 =

State highway in Greenwood & Saluda Counties, South Carolina

South Carolina Highway 702

Route information
- Maintained by SCDOT
- Length: 18.950 mi (30.497 km)
- Existed: 1952–present

Major junctions
- West end: SC 246 near Ninety Six
- East end: SC 39 near Saluda

Location
- Country: United States
- State: South Carolina
- Counties: Greenwood, Saluda

Highway system
- South Carolina State Highway System; Interstate; US; State; Scenic
← US 701	→ SC 703

South Carolina Highway 702 (SC 702) is a 18.950-mile (30.497 km) primary state highway in the U.S. state of South Carolina. It serves as main access to Lake Greenwood State Park.

== Route description ==
SC 702 is a two-lane rural highway that traverses for 18.9 miles (30.4 km) from SC 246 between Ninety Six and Coronaca, to SC 39 north of Saluda.

== History ==
The current routing of SC 702 was created by 1952 and has remained unchanged since. It was originally established in 1940 as a loop off SC 7 west of Greenwood. By 1942, SC 702 was extended east through Greenwood to SC 246, then southeast along the route it shares today to SC 39 north of Saluda. In 1948, SC 702 was reduced back to its original routing as a loop highway. In 1950, what remained of SC 702 became part of SC 72. The roads between the loop and its current alignment: Cambridge Avenue (S-25-29), Siloam Church Road (S-24-101) and Vines Road (S-24-179), has remained as secondary roads.

== Junction list ==
County	Location	mi	km	Destinations	Notes
Greenwood		0.000– 0.040	0.000– 0.064	SC 246 – Ninety Six, Coronaca	Western terminus; to Ninety Six National Historic Site
Greenwood		7.050	11.346	SC 34 – Ninety Six, Newberry	To Ninety Six National Historic Site
Saluda		18.950	30.497	SC 39 (Chappells Highway) – Saluda, Chappells	Eastern terminus
1.000 mi = 1.609 km; 1.000 km = 0.621 mi
