= South Carolina Highway 246 =

State highway in South Carolina, United States

South Carolina Highway 246

Route information
- Maintained by SCDOT
- Length: 28.700 mi (46.188 km)
- Existed: 1930–present
- Tourist routes: South Carolina Heritage Corridor: Discovery Route

Major junctions
- South end: US 178 in Friendship
- US 221 / SC 72 in Coronaca; US 25 near Hodges
- North end: US 178 in Hodges

Location
- Country: United States
- State: South Carolina
- Counties: Greenwood

Highway system
- South Carolina State Highway System; Interstate; US; State; Scenic
| ← SC 245 | → SC 247 |

South Carolina Highway 246 (SC 246) is a 28.700-mile (46.188 km) primary state highway in the U.S. state of South Carolina. It connects the communities and towns in eastern Greenwood County.

== Route description ==
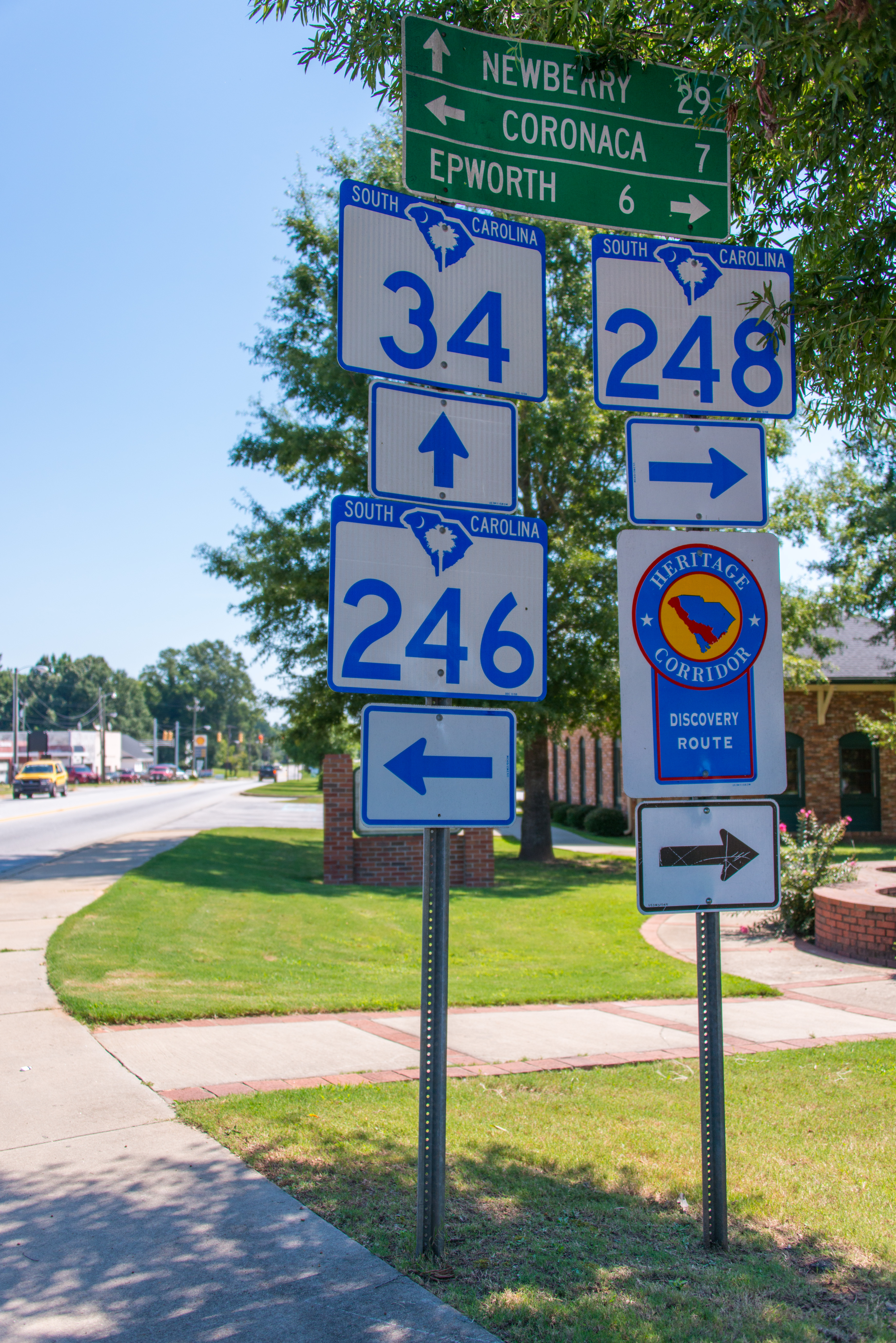
SC 34, SC 246 and SC 248 in Ninety Six

SC 246 is a two-lane rural highway that traverses from Friendship to Hodges; connecting the town of Ninety Six and the communities of Coronaca and Cokesbury. The highway also provides access to Star Fort Pond, at Ninety Six National Historic Site, via Kinard Road (S-24-27).

== History ==
Established in 1930 as a replacement for part of SC 24, SC 246 traversed from Friendship to Ninety Six. From 1932 to 1933, U.S. Route 178 (US 178) was routed alongside SC 246. In 1939, SC 246 was extended northwest to US 178 in Hodges. By 1942, SC 246 was extended northwest again along US 178 to Tinsley then west to SC 20/SC 185, in Due West; this marked the longest point for the highway. In 1948, SC 246 was truncated back to Hodges, leaving behind Due West Road (S-24-31), Mount Lebanon Road (S-1-38) and Ellis Road (S-1-114).

== Junction list ==
The entire route is in Greenwood County.

| Location | mi | km | Destinations | Notes |
|---|---|---|---|---|
| Friendship | 0.000 | 0.000 | US 178 – Greenwood, Saluda, Columbia | Southern terminus |
| Ninety Six | 11.250 | 18.105 | SC 34 east – Newberry | Southern end of SC 34 concurrency |
| Ninety Six | 11.370 | 18.298 | SC 34 west / SC 248 south – Greenwood, Epworth | Northern end of SC 34 concurrency; to Ninety Six National Historic Site |
| | 14.650– 14.740 | 23.577– 23.722 | SC 702 east – Saluda | Western terminus of SC 702; to Greenwood State Park |
| Coronaca | 18.710 | 30.111 | US 221 / SC 72 – Greenwood, Laurens, Clinton | |
| Cokesbury | 26.450 | 42.567 | SC 254 (Cokesbury Road) – Greenwood, Ware Shoals | |
| | 27.800 | 44.740 | US 25 – Greenwood, Ware Shoals | |
| Hodges | 28.700 | 46.188 | US 178 – Greenwood, Honea Path | Northern terminus |
1.000 mi = 1.609 km; 1.000 km = 0.621 mi: Concurrency terminus

== Future ==
The South Carolina Department of Transportation (SCDOT) plans to widen SC 246 from two lanes to five lanes between US 221/SC 72 and Emerald Road. Next, it is expected to go from two lanes to three lanes from Emerald Road to SC 702, which also includes widening the bridge over the CSX Railroad. This project aims to improve traffic efficiency and economic development. Construction is planned to start in mid 2027.
