= South Carolina Highway 248 =

Road in South Carolina, US

South Carolina Highway 248
- William Bruce Ezell Memorial Highway

Route information
- Maintained by SCDOT
- Length: 6.170 mi (9.930 km)
- Existed: 1940–present
- Tourist routes: SC Heritage Corridor: Discovery Route

Major junctions
- South end: US 178 in Epworth
- North end: SC 34 / SC 246 in Ninety Six

Location
- Country: United States
- State: South Carolina
- Counties: Greenwood

Highway system
- South Carolina State Highway System; Interstate; US; State; Scenic
← SC 247	→ SC 252

South Carolina Highway 248 (SC 248) is a 6.170-mile (9.930 km) primary state highway in the U.S. state of South Carolina. It serves as main access to the Ninety Six National Historic Site.

== Route description ==
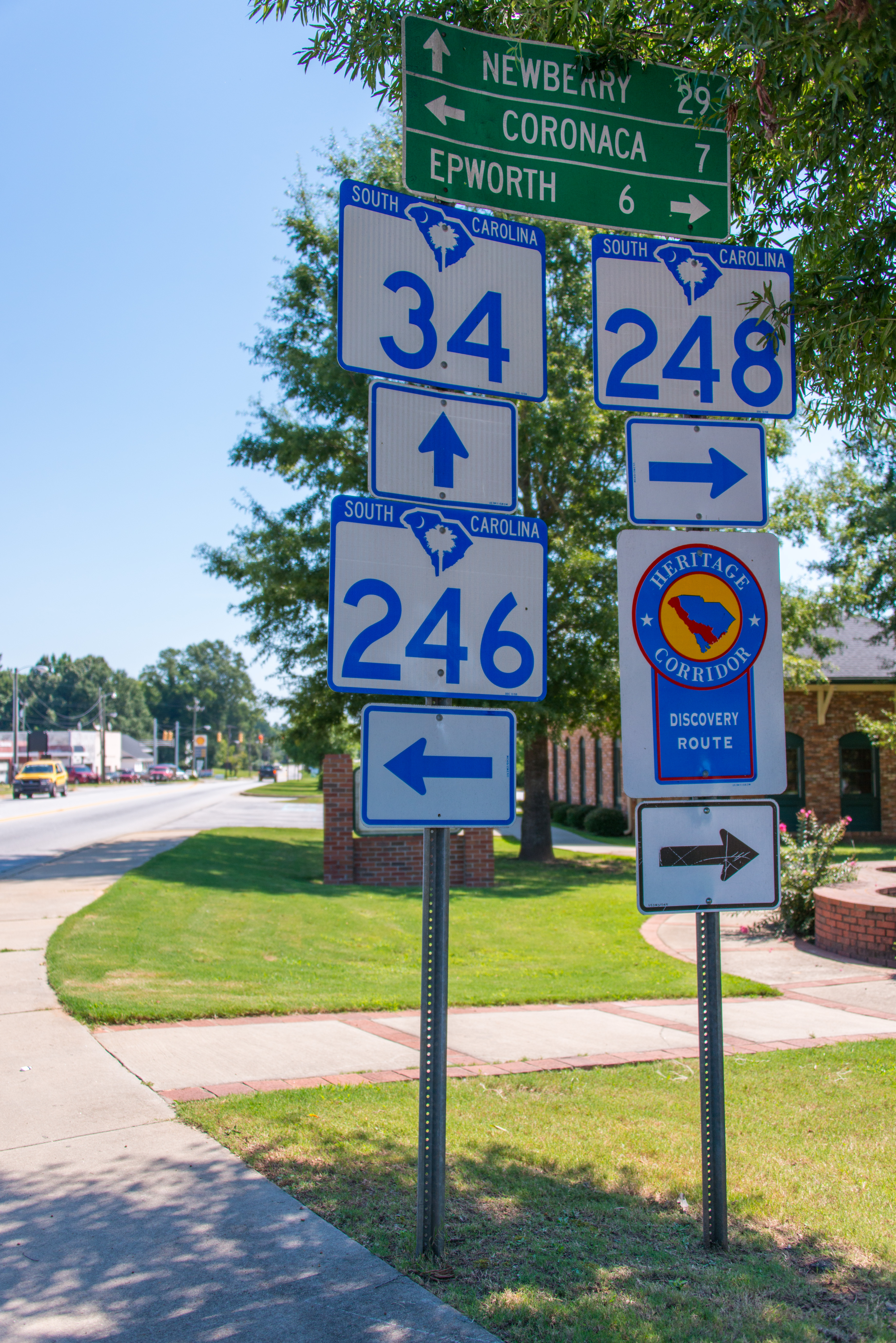
SC 34, SC 246, South Carolina Discovery Route, and SC 248 in Ninety Six

SC 248 is a two-lane rural highway that traverses from Epworth at U.S. Route 178 (US 178) to Ninety Six at SC 34/SC 246. It is entirely concurrent with the South Carolina Discovery Route

== History ==
Established in 1940, it is the second SC 248 and has remained unchanged since inception. The first SC 248 was established by 1930 as a renumbering of SC 151 from US 29/SC 24 in Anderson to SC 20 in Williamston. In 1935, SC 248 was renumbered as part of US 29.

== Major intersections ==
The entire route is in Greenwood County.

Location	mi	km	Destinations	Notes
Epworth	0.000	0.000	US 178 – Greenwood, Saluda	Southern terminus
Ninety Six	6.170	9.930	SC 34 (Main Street) / SC 246 (Cambridge Street) – Greenwood, Coronaca, Newberry	Northern terminus
1.000 mi = 1.609 km; 1.000 km = 0.621 mi
