= SC10 =

SC10 or variants may refer to:

- 10 Regional, formerly Southern Cross Ten, an Australian television channel
- Renault SC10 or Saviem SC10, a former bus type by Renault Trucks
- (79119) 1989 SC10, an asteroid
- a FIPS 10-4 region code, see List of FIPS region codes (S–U)
- SC-10, a subdivision code for the Seychelles, see ISO 3166-2:SC
- South Carolina Highway 10, a highway in South Carolina
