= North Carolina Highway 120 =

State highway in North Carolina, US

North Carolina Highway 120

Route information
- Maintained by NCDOT
- Length: 4.7 mi (7.6 km)
- Existed: 1929–present

Major junctions
- South end: US 221A in Cliffside
- US 74 near Mooresboro
- North end: US 74 Bus. near Mooresboro

Location
- Country: United States
- State: North Carolina
- Counties: Rutherford, Cleveland

Highway system
- North Carolina Highway System; Interstate; US; State; Scenic
| ← NC 119 | → NC 121 |

North Carolina Highway 120 (NC 120) is a primary state highway in the U.S. state of North Carolina. The highway connects the community of Cliffside and the town of Mooresboro.

== Route description ==
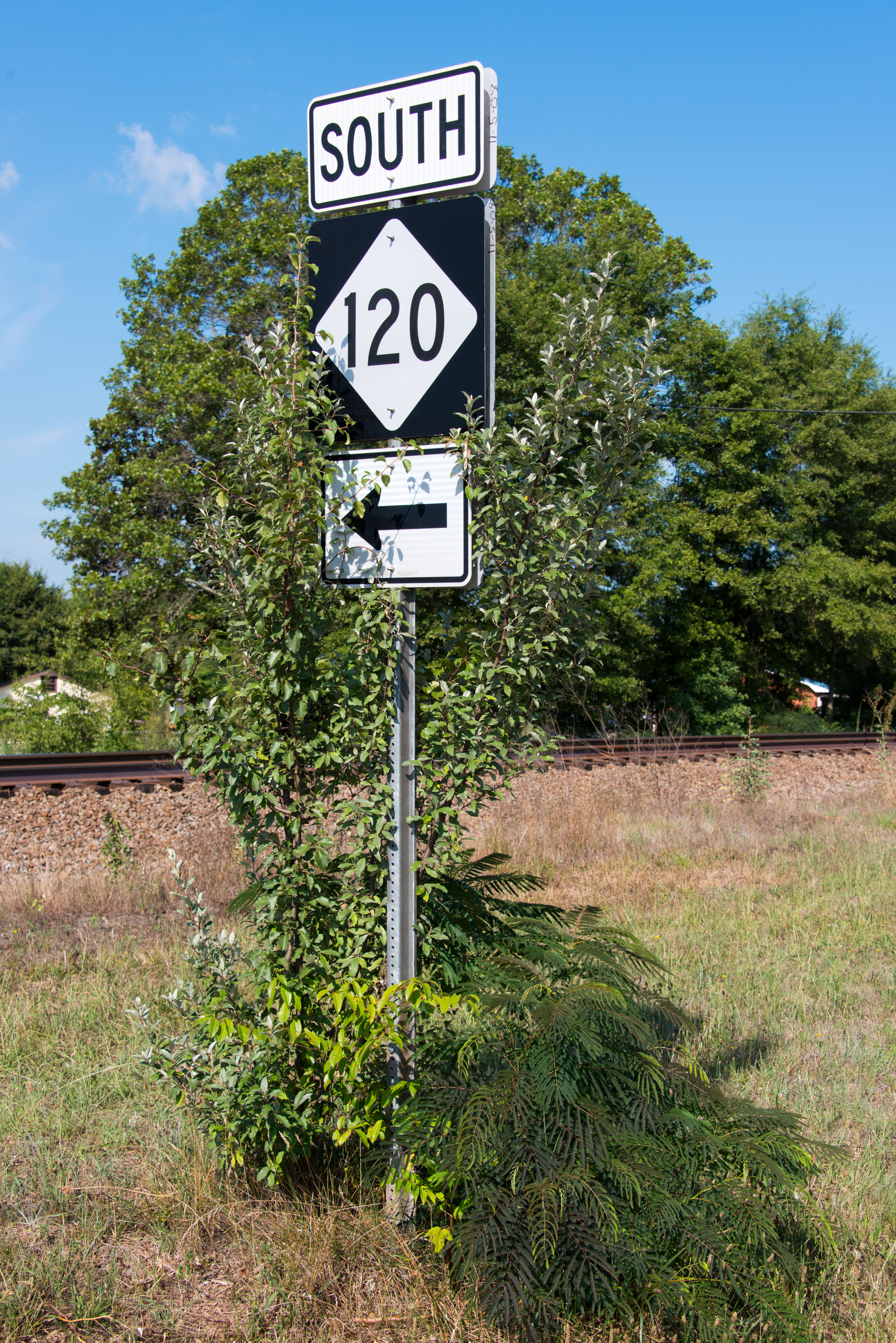
NC 120

South at US 74 Business, NC 120 begins at an intersection with US 221 Alternative, in the town of Cliffside. From the intersection the highway runs northeast along a two-lane road, running through a residential area. After intersecting Squirrel Hollow Drive, the area becomes rural and runs between several farms. The road runs parallel to Hills Creek to the west. West of Mooresboro, NC 120 intersects the US 74 freeway. From the intersection the road continues for about half a mile until reaching its northern terminus at US 74 Business east of Mooresboro.

No section of NC 120 is listed as part of the National Highway System. The Annual Average Daily Traffic Report in 2013 shows that the most daily traffic on NC 120 occurs south of SR 1926 with 2600 vehicles, with the section north of US 74 showing the least amount of traffic with only 1200 vehicles. On average the highway sees about 2300 vehicles a day.

== History ==
Established in 1929 as a new primary routing, from NC 207 (now US 221A), in Cliffside to NC 20 (now US 74 Bus), near Mooresboro. The route has remained unchanged since.

== Junction list ==
| County | Location | mi | km | Destinations | Notes |
|---|---|---|---|---|---|
| Rutherford | Cliffside | 0.0 | 0.0 | US 221A – Forest City, Chesnee | |
| Rutherford | | 4.0 | 6.4 | US 74 – Shelby, Asheville | |
| Cleveland | | 4.7 | 7.6 | US 74 Bus. – Mooresboro, Forest City | |
1.000 mi = 1.609 km; 1.000 km = 0.621 mi
