= South Carolina Highway 225 =

State highway in South Carolina, United States

South Carolina Highway 225

Route information
- Maintained by SCDOT
- Length: 5.900 mi (9.495 km)
- Existed: 1977–present

Major junctions
- South end: US 25 / US 178 near Greenwood
- US 221 near Greenwood
- North end: SC 72 Bus. near Greenwood

Location
- Country: United States
- State: South Carolina
- Counties: Greenwood

Highway system
- South Carolina State Highway System; Interstate; US; State; Scenic
| ← SC 223 | → SC 230 |

South Carolina Highway 225 (SC 225) is a 5.900-mile (9.495 km) state highway in the U.S. state of South Carolina that travels southwest of Greenwood. The highway serves as a southwestern bypass for the city. The easternmost 1/2 mile (0.80 km) of the highway is known as West Scotch Cross Road.

== Route description ==
SC 225 begins at the U.S. Route 25 (US 25)/US 178 concurrency southeast of Greenwood. The highway swings around to the west side of the city where it ends at SC 72 Business (SC 72 Bus.).

== History ==
The original SC 225 was established in 1940 as a new primary route, running from Waterloo to Cross Hill. The route was soon extended west to just east of Ware Shoals. In 1948, the route was downgraded.

The current SC 225 was created between 1974 and 1977 as a new route. The route originally ran from SC 72 Bus. to US 221. The route was extended slightly east to the US 25/US 178 overlap in either 1988 or 1989.

== Major intersections ==
The entire route is in Greenwood, Greenwood County.

| mi | km | Destinations | Notes |
|---|---|---|---|
| 0.000 | 0.000 | US 25 / US 178 – Edgefield, Saluda | Southern terminus |
| 1.160 | 1.867 | US 221 – Laurens, McCormick | |
| 4.890 | 7.870 | SC 10 (McCormick Highway / Maxwell Avenue) – Greenwood, McCormick | |
| 5.900 | 9.495 | SC 72 Bus. (West Cambridge Avenue) – Greenwood, Abbeville | Northern terminus |
1.000 mi = 1.609 km; 1.000 km = 0.621 mi
