= Cliffside, North Carolina =

- Unincorporated community
- Location within North Carolina Location within the United States
- Coordinates: 35°14′53″N 81°45′55″W
- Country: United States
- State: North Carolina
- County: Rutherford

Area
  - Total: 2.33 sq mi (6.03 km^{2})
  - Land: 2.33 sq mi (6.03 km^{2})
  - Water: 0 sq mi (0.00 km^{2})
- Elevation: 843 ft (257 m)

Population (2020)
  - Total: 530
  - Density: 227.7/sq mi (87.93/km^{2})
- Time zone: UTC-5 (Eastern (EST))
  - Summer (DST): UTC-4 (EDT)
- ZIP code: 28024
- Area code: 828
- GNIS feature ID: 2628618

Cliffside is an unincorporated community and census-designated place (CDP) in southeastern Rutherford County, North Carolina, United States. Its population was 530 as of the 2020 census. Cliffside has a post office with ZIP code 28024. U.S. Route 221 Alternate and North Carolina Highway 120 pass through the community.

== Demographics ==
Historical population
Census	Pop.	Note	%±
2020	530		—
U.S. Decennial Census

== History ==
Cliffside was founded as a company town by Raleigh Rutherford (R.R.) Haynes, who established a textile mill there on the Second Broad River in 1899. Haynes had previously helped to build up the mills and factories of nearby Henrietta and Caroleen High Shoals, a former community in this vicinity, was a post office as early as 1828.

It was entirely owned by Haynes and his business partners, who owned all of the property, homes and farmland in the town. The farm acreage was rented to tenant farmers, and the homes were rented to Haynes' employees at low rates. Homes cost about $0.25 weekly for each room in the house. Because it was privately owned, it had no town council or city limits, and minimal crime.

Town residents had to have at least one member of their household employed by Haynes, and had to obey certain town rules, such as not keeping dogs on their property. The town reached its height in the 1950s, when it had about 2,500 residents. Millionaire Earl Owensby originally hailed from Cliffside, and built Earl Owensby Studios just 10 miles from the town.

Cliffside Public School was added to the National Register of Historic Places in 1998.
