= South Carolina Highway 340 =

U.S. State Highway

South Carolina Highway 340

Route information
- Maintained by SCDOT
- Length: 10.990 mi (17.687 km)

Major junctions
- South end: SC 403 near Timmonsville
- I-20 near Florence; US 52 in Darlington
- North end: SC 34 / SC 151 in Darlington

Location
- Country: United States
- State: South Carolina
- Counties: Darlington

Highway system
- South Carolina State Highway System; Interstate; US; State; Scenic
← SC 336	→ SC 341

South Carolina Highway 340 (SC 340) is a 10.990-mile-long (17.687 km) state highway in the U.S. state of South Carolina. The highway connects the Timmonsville area with Darlington.

== Route description ==
SC 340 begins at an intersection with SC 403 (Oates Highway) north-northwest of Timmonsville, within Darlington County. It travels to the northeast and crosses Middle Swamp and Myrtle Branch before an interchange with Interchange 20 (I-20). It crosses over Jeffries Creek and High Hill Creek before entering the city limits of Darlington. There, it intersects U.S. Route 52 (US 52; Governor Williams Highway). It crosses some railroad tracks before it meets its northern terminus, an intersection with SC 34 (Pearl Street).

== Major intersections ==
The entire route is in Darlington County.

Location	mi	km	Destinations	Notes
	0.000	0.000	SC 403 (Oates Highway) – Timmonsville, Hartsville	Southern terminus
	3.940	6.341	I-20 – Columbia, Florence	I-20 exit 137
Darlington	10.240	16.480	US 52 (Governor Williams Highway) to SC 34 – Bennettsville, Cheraw, Florence	
Darlington	10.990	17.687	SC 34 (Pearl Street / SC 151) – Bishopville, Dillon	Northern terminus
1.000 mi = 1.609 km; 1.000 km = 0.621 mi
