= Alex Lee Inc. =

American holding company

Alex Lee
- Type: Private; family business
- Industry: Grocery
- Founded: 1931; 95 years ago
- Founders: Alex and Lee George
- Headquarters: Hickory, North Carolina, United States
- Area served: United States
- Key people: Brian George (CEO); Brian Nicholson (CFO)
- Products: Supermarkets, grocery stores, pharmacies, food
- Services: Food distribution, wholesale distribution,
- Revenue: ▲$3.2 billion (FY 2021)
- Owner: George family
- Number of employees: 16,000
- Divisions: Merchants Distributors
- Subsidiaries: Lowes Foods, KJ's Market, IGA Southeast
- Website: www.alexlee.com

Alex Lee is an American holding company specializing in food retail and wholesale distribution. It is headquartered in Hickory, North Carolina. It runs its own supermarket chain and supplies food and non-food items to independent supermarkets across about a dozen states across the Southeastern United States.

As of 2014, Alex Lee is ranked 139 on the list of largest privately held companies in the United States, as listed by Forbes. Alex Lee owns the Lowes Foods supermarket chain as well as Merchants Distributors, Inc., which supplies more than 600 stores located in eleven states, mostly in the Southeast.

== History ==
The company's roots date back to around 1920, when A.C. Kelly took over Merchants Produce Company of Hickory, a wholesale fruit and produce company. In 1931, Moses George, a Shelby, North Carolina grocer, bought Merchants Produce for $17,000 and began running it with his sons Alex and G.L. George. Merchants Produce took advantage of the trend away from "mom-and-pop" grocery stores, as chain stores became common. In 1938, the name changed to Merchants Produce and Grocery as the company became an important distributor of merchandise to the independent stores in North Carolina and South Carolina.

After Moses George died in 1947, his sons Alex and Lee took over the business, along with daughter Josephine. The name changed to Merchants Distributors Inc. or MDI in 1956. By 1960, MDI had over 130 employees and supplied 400 grocery stores within 150 miles. Alex George was president, and the company added a $1 million, four-acre facility on Twelfth Street. In 1965, MDI began selling to schools and eventually merged its MDI Foodservice with James Wholesale Company, also in Hickory, forming Institution Food House (IFH), with Lee George as president. Norman James was vice president; after his death, the George brothers bought his share of the company and made IFH a subsidiary of MDI.

Lee George retired in 1980 but remained chairman.

After MDI bought Institution Food House, in 1992, MDI reorganized as a holding company, Alex Lee, Inc., with MDI, IFH and Lowes Foods as subsidiaries, named for Alex and Lee George. MDI president Boyd Lee George, grandson of the founder, became chairman and president, remaining as chairman of MDI.

In 1993, MDI became a distribution center for Independent Grocers Alliance (IGA). In addition to providing the IGA stores with low-priced merchandise, this arrangement allowed IGA to take advantage of the advertising and merchandising skills of MDI.

Also in 1995, MDI announced plans for a $60 million plant in Caldwell County. The company received $5.5 million in economic incentives from Caldwell County and Hickory, with plans for Hickory to annex the site and turn part of it into an industrial park (though as of 2008 the city had done nothing with its part of the land). This arrangement created controversy because the North Carolina Supreme Court had not yet ruled on whether such economic incentives to keep businesses were constitutional. Two years later, the distribution center was complete, though neighbors complained about the noise, and a few people claimed construction damaged their nearby homes. IFH took over the former MDI location.

MDI also supplies Galaxy Food Centers, founded in 1979, with 100 stores in 7 states.

Alex Lee Inc. announced on October 28, 2019, that it had completed its purchase of Scranton, South Carolina-based W. Lee Flowers & Co., a wholesale distributor which supplies 75 IGA and KJ's Market stores, 50 of which the company owned.

On September 1, 2020, Alex Lee, Inc. announced that it was purchasing 20 BI-LO stores in South Carolina and Georgia from Southeastern Grocers with the intent to rebrand 15 of the stores as KJ's Market IGA with the other 5 rebranded under the Lowes Foods banner.

MDI now supplies more than 600 stores located in eleven states, mostly in the Southeast.
