= The Oaks (Coronaca, South Carolina) =

Historic house in South Carolina, United States

- U.S. National Register of Historic Places
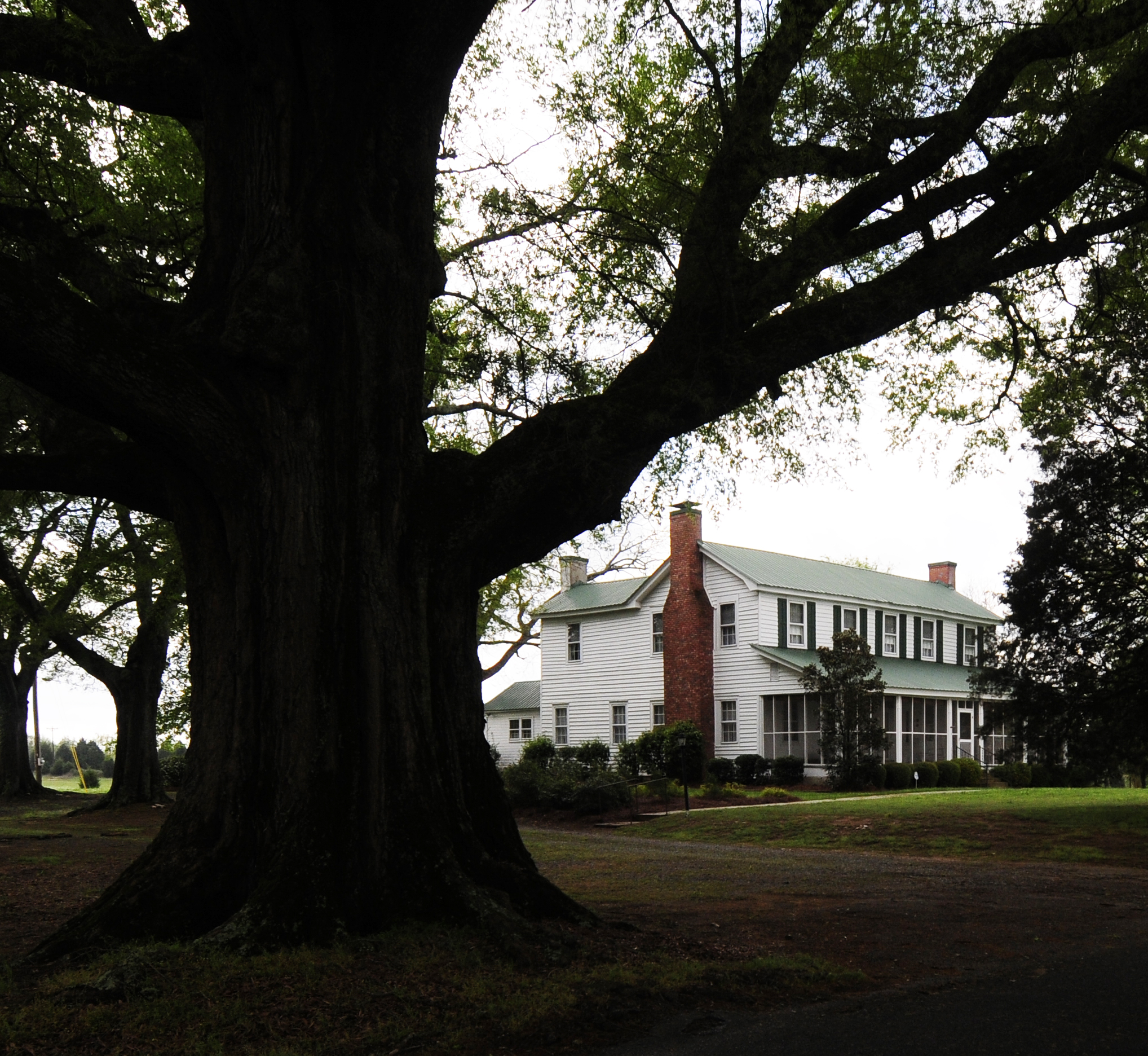
- The Oaks, March 2012

- Location within South Carolina Location within the United States
- Location: 114 Old Puckett's Ferry Rd., near Coronaca, South Carolina
- Coordinates: 34°15′25″N 82°5′5″W
- Area: 1.37 acres (0.55 ha)
- Built: c. 1825, c. 1920
- Architectural style: I-house
- NRHP reference No.: 10001040
- Added to NRHP: December 17, 2010

The Oaks, also known as Downs Calhoun House, Calhoun-Henderson House, and Lumley Farmstead is a historic home and farm complex located near Coronaca, Greenwood County, South Carolina. It consists of a two-story wood-frame I-house, built about 1825, with significant additions and alterations about 1845, 1855, 1880, and 1920. Also on the property are the contributing small storage building (c. 1850), two large cow/livestock barns (c. 1920), a farm workshop (ca. 1920), a dairy barn (c. 1950), an early-20th century livestock watering trough, and an early-to-mid-20th century gasoline pump.

It was listed on the National Register of Historic Places in 2010.
