= KJ's Market =

Supermarket chain

KJ’s Market
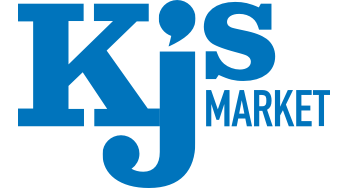
- Type: Subsidiary
- Industry: Retail (Grocery)
- Founded: 2006 (20 years ago) in Florence, South Carolina, U.S.
- Founder: Charles Crouch
- Headquarters: Lake City, South Carolina, U.S.
- Number of locations: 34
- Areas served: South Carolina; Eastern Georgia
- Products: Bakery, dairy, deli, frozen foods, general grocery, meat, pharmacy, produce, seafood, snacks, liquor
- Owner: Lowes Foods (under license from IGA)
- Parent: Alex Lee Inc. (through Lowes Foods
- Website: www.kjsmarket.com

KJ's Market is a supermarket chain in the United States. It is owned by Lowes Foods. KJ's has an annual revenue of $356,000,000.

== History ==
KJ's Market first opened in Florence, South Carolina in 2006.

On September 1, 2020, it was announced that the chain had acquired 20 former BI-LO locations from Southeastern Grocers. In 2021, the stores were rebranded as KJ's, IGA and Lowes Foods.
