= Byrd's =

American supermarket chain

Byrd's (officially Byrd's Food Stores) was a supermarket chain based in Burlington, North Carolina. It was a family owned and operated company by the Byrd family of Burlington.

Operating mainly in the Piedmont and Coastal Plain of North Carolina and Southside Virginia, the chain was sold and became Lowes Foods in 1997 after establishing 43 stores.
