= Silverstreet, South Carolina =

- Town
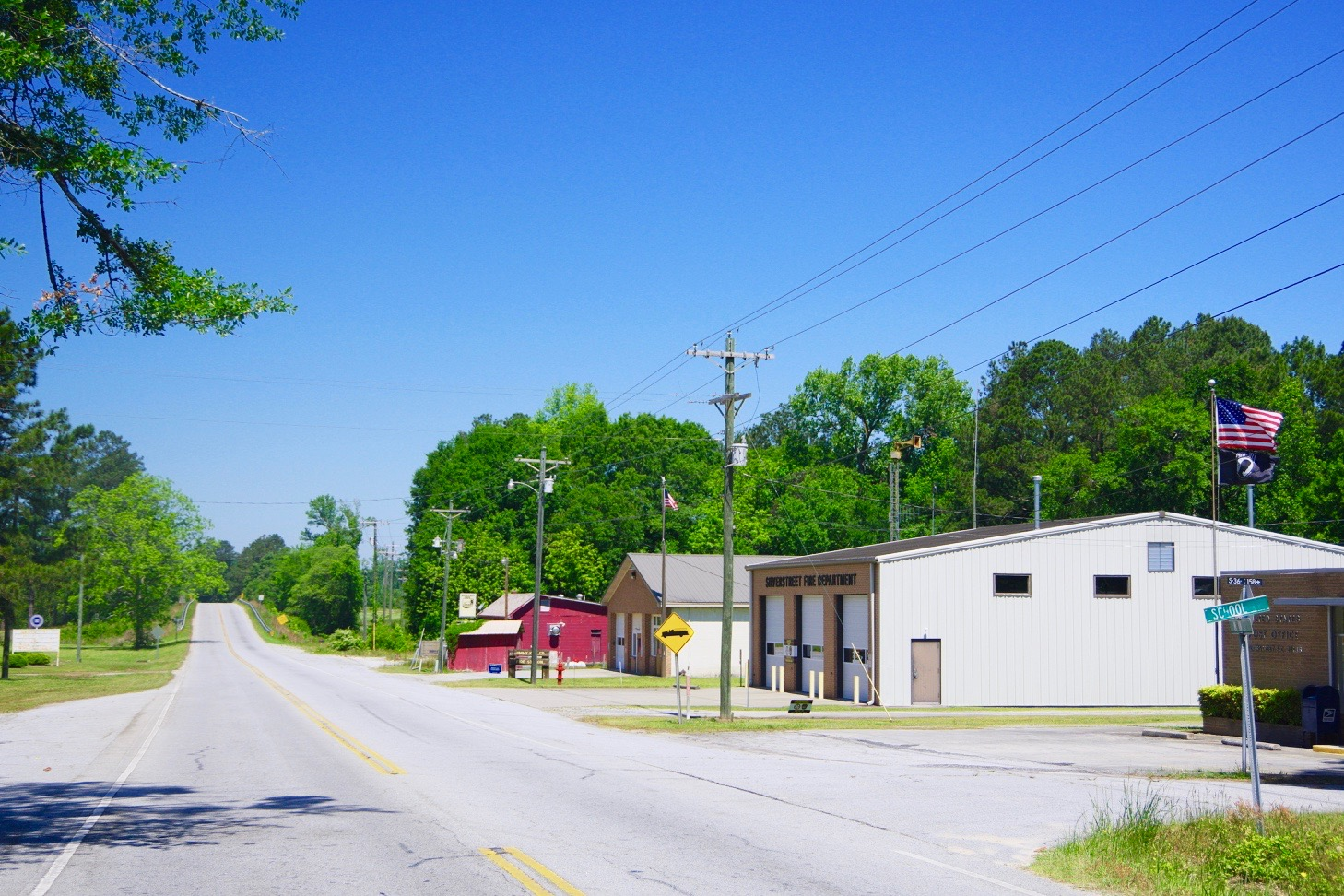
- Main Street (SC 34)

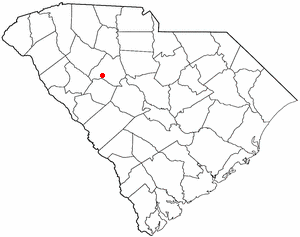
- Location of Silverstreet, South Carolina
- Coordinates: 34°13′04″N 81°42′53″W
- Country: United States
- State: South Carolina
- County: Newberry

Area
  - Total: 3.35 sq mi (8.67 km^{2})
  - Land: 3.35 sq mi (8.67 km^{2})
  - Water: 0 sq mi (0.00 km^{2})
- Elevation: 495 ft (151 m)

Population (2020)
  - Total: 164
  - Density: 49.0/sq mi (18.91/km^{2})
- Time zone: UTC-5 (Eastern (EST))
  - Summer (DST): UTC-4 (EDT)
- ZIP code: 29145
- Area codes: 803, 839
- FIPS code: 45-66400
- GNIS feature ID: 2407343

Silverstreet is a town in Newberry County, South Carolina, United States. As of the 2020 census, Silverstreet had a population of 164.

== Geography ==
Silverstreet is located along South Carolina Highway 34 west of Newberry and just north of the Saluda River. Lake Murray lies to the southeast, and Lake Greenwood lies to the northwest.

According to the United States Census Bureau, the town has a total area of 3.5 square miles (9.1 km^{2}), all land.

== Demographics ==
Historical population
Census	Pop.	Note	%±
1920	297		—
1930	221		−25.6%
1940	146		−33.9%
1950	201		37.7%
1960	181		−10.0%
1970	156		−13.8%
1980	200		28.2%
1990	156		−22.0%
2000	216		38.5%
2010	162		−25.0%
2020	164		1.2%
U.S. Decennial Census

As of the census of 2000, there were 216 people, 83 households, and 58 families residing in the town. The population density was 61.4 inhabitants per square mile (23.7/km^{2}). There were 92 housing units at an average density of 26.2 per square mile (10.1/km^{2}). The racial makeup of the town was 83.33% White, 14.35% African American, and 2.31% from two or more races. Hispanic or Latino of any race were 1.85% of the population.

There were 83 households, out of which 31.3% had children under the age of 18 living with them, 55.4% were married couples living together, 9.6% had a female householder with no husband present, and 30.1% were non-families. 27.7% of all households were made up of individuals, and 18.1% had someone living alone who was 65 years of age or older. The average household size was 2.60 and the average family size was 3.17.

In the town, the population was spread out, with 24.5% under the age of 18, 7.9% from 18 to 24, 29.2% from 25 to 44, 17.6% from 45 to 64, and 20.8% who were 65 years of age or older. The median age was 37 years. For every 100 females, there were 81.5 males. For every 100 females age 18 and over, there were 79.1 males.

The median income for a household in the town was $27,321, and the median income for a family was $43,750. Males had a median income of $24,063 versus $14,861 for females. The per capita income for the town was $17,184. About 7.7% of families and 7.6% of the population were below the poverty line, including 4.9% of those under the age of eighteen and 17.8% of those 65 or over.
