= South Carolina Highway 122 =

State highway in South Carolina, United States

South Carolina Highway 122
- Dave Lyle Boulevard

Route information
- Maintained by SCDOT
- Length: 5.740 mi (9.238 km)
- Existed: 1975–present

Major junctions
- West end: SC 72 in Rock Hill
- US 21 / SC 121 in Rock Hill; I-77 in Rock Hill
- East end: Waterford Park Drive in Rock Hill

Location
- Country: United States
- State: South Carolina
- Counties: York

Highway system
- South Carolina State Highway System; Interstate; US; State; Scenic
← SC 121	→ US 123

South Carolina Highway 122 (SC 122), also known as Dave Lyle Boulevard, is a 5.740-mile (9.238 km) state highway in Rock Hill, York County, South Carolina. It travels from the intersection with West Main Street in Rock Hill and continues west to Waterford Park Drive, also in Rock Hill.

== Route description ==
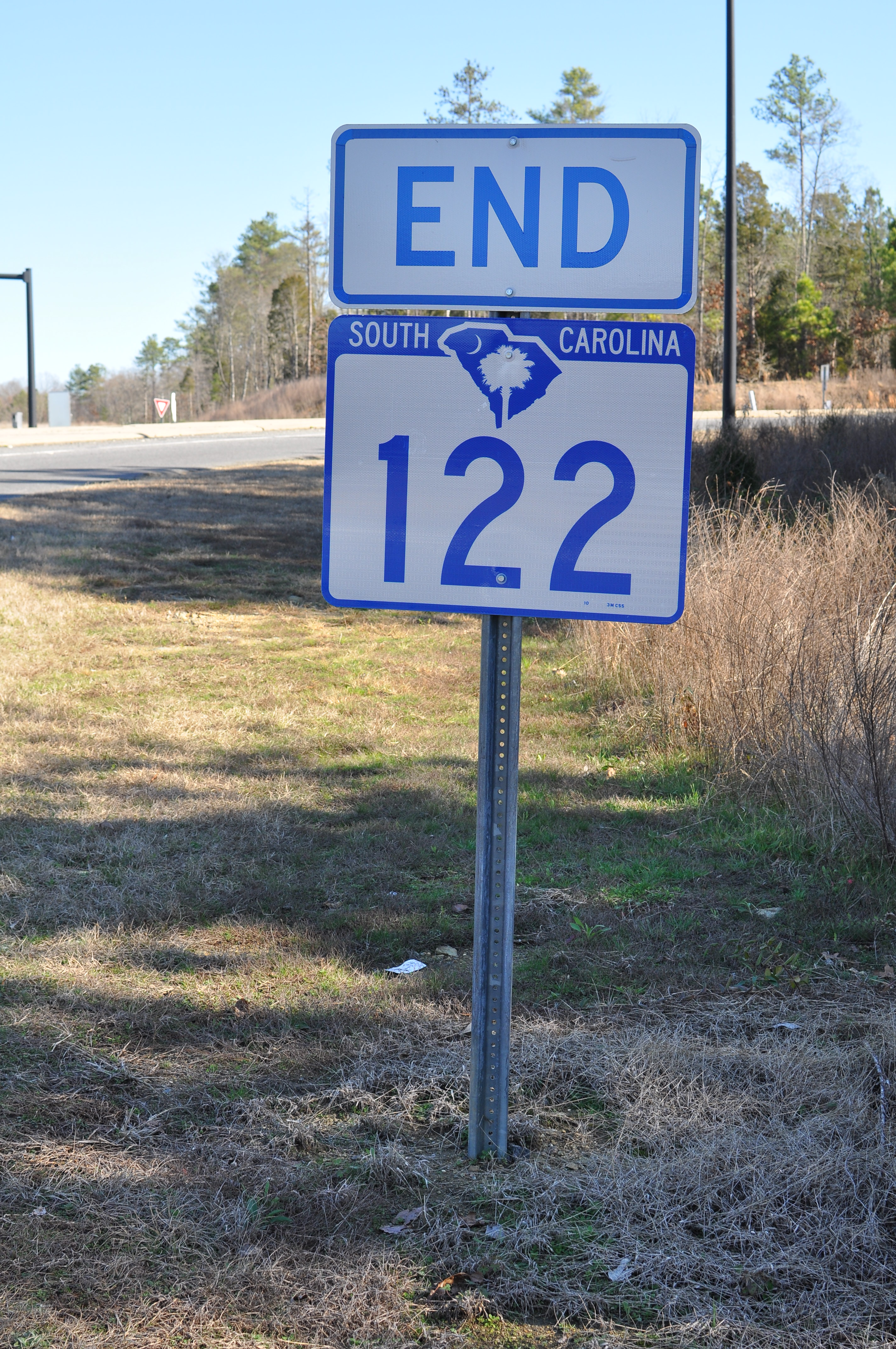
End of SC 122 at Waterford Park Drive

SC 122 starts at SC 72's eastern terminus on Johnston Street before exiting just north of the intersection onto Dave Lyle Boulevard. From there, it follows Dave Lyle Boulevard northeasterly, intersecting Main Street and further down a full interchange with U.S. Route 21 (US 21)/SC 121. The highway continues on a more easterly course to an interchange with Interstate 77 (I-77) before terminating at Waterford Park Drive.

== History ==
The first SC 122 appeared in 1941 or 1942 as a new primary one-mile (1.6 km) routing from SC 2 in Cayce to US 1/US 21/SC 2/SC 5 in West Columbia. It was decommissioned in 1948.

The current SC 122 was established as a new primary routing in 1974 or 1975; it went from SC 72 east to I-77. In 2001, it was extended to its current eastern terminus at Waterford Park Drive.

== Future ==
Future plans are to construct an extension of SC 122 east into Lancaster County, ending at the US 521/SC 75 intersection; which will connect the Catawba Reservation and provide another crossing over the Catawba River.

== Major intersections ==
The entire route is in Rock Hill, York County.

mi	km	Destinations	Notes
0.000	0.000	SC 72 west (Saluda Street) / Elizabeth Lane	Western terminus
0.237	0.381	South David Lyle Boulevard / Johnston Street	Interchange
2.690	4.329	US 21 / SC 121 (Anderson Road) – Chester, Fort Mill	Interchange
4.140	6.663	I-77 – Columbia, Charlotte	I-77 exit 79
5.740	9.238	Waterford Park Drive	Eastern terminus
1.000 mi = 1.609 km; 1.000 km = 0.621 mi
