= South Carolina Highway 247 =

State highway in South Carolina, United States

South Carolina Highway 247

Route information
- Maintained by SCDOT
- Length: 10.700 mi (17.220 km)

Major junctions
- South end: SC 20 in Belton
- North end: US 25 in Ware Place

Location
- Country: United States
- State: South Carolina
- Counties: Anderson, Greenville

Highway system
- South Carolina State Highway System; Interstate; US; State; Scenic
← SC 246	→ SC 248

South Carolina Highway 247 (SC 247) is a 10.700-mile-long (17.220 km) state highway in the U.S. state of South Carolina. The highway connects Belton and Ware Place with rural areas of Anderson and Greenville counties.

== Route description ==
SC 247 begins at an intersection with SC 20 (North Main Street) in Belton, within Anderson County, where the roadway continues as Breazeale Street. This intersection is approximately 300 feet (91 m) from that highway's intersection with U.S. Route 76 (US 76) and US 178. SC 247 travels to the northeast and crosses over some railroad tracks before leaving the city limits. It crosses over West Prong Broadmouth Creek and Broad Mouth Creek. Farther to the northeast, it crosses the Saluda River on the Cooley Bridge. This crossing marks the Greenville County line. The highway winds its way to the north-northeast, through mostly rural areas of the county before meeting its northern terminus, an intersection with US 25 (Augusta Road) in Ware Place.

== Major intersections ==
County	Location	mi	km	Destinations	Notes
Anderson	Belton	0.000	0.000	SC 20 (North Main Street) – Honea Path, Anderson, Williamston	
Greenville	Ware Place	10.700	17.220	US 25 (Augusta Road) – Ware Shoals, Greenville	
1.000 mi = 1.609 km; 1.000 km = 0.621 mi
