= Cliffside Public School =

Historic school building in North Carolina, United States

- U.S. National Register of Historic Places
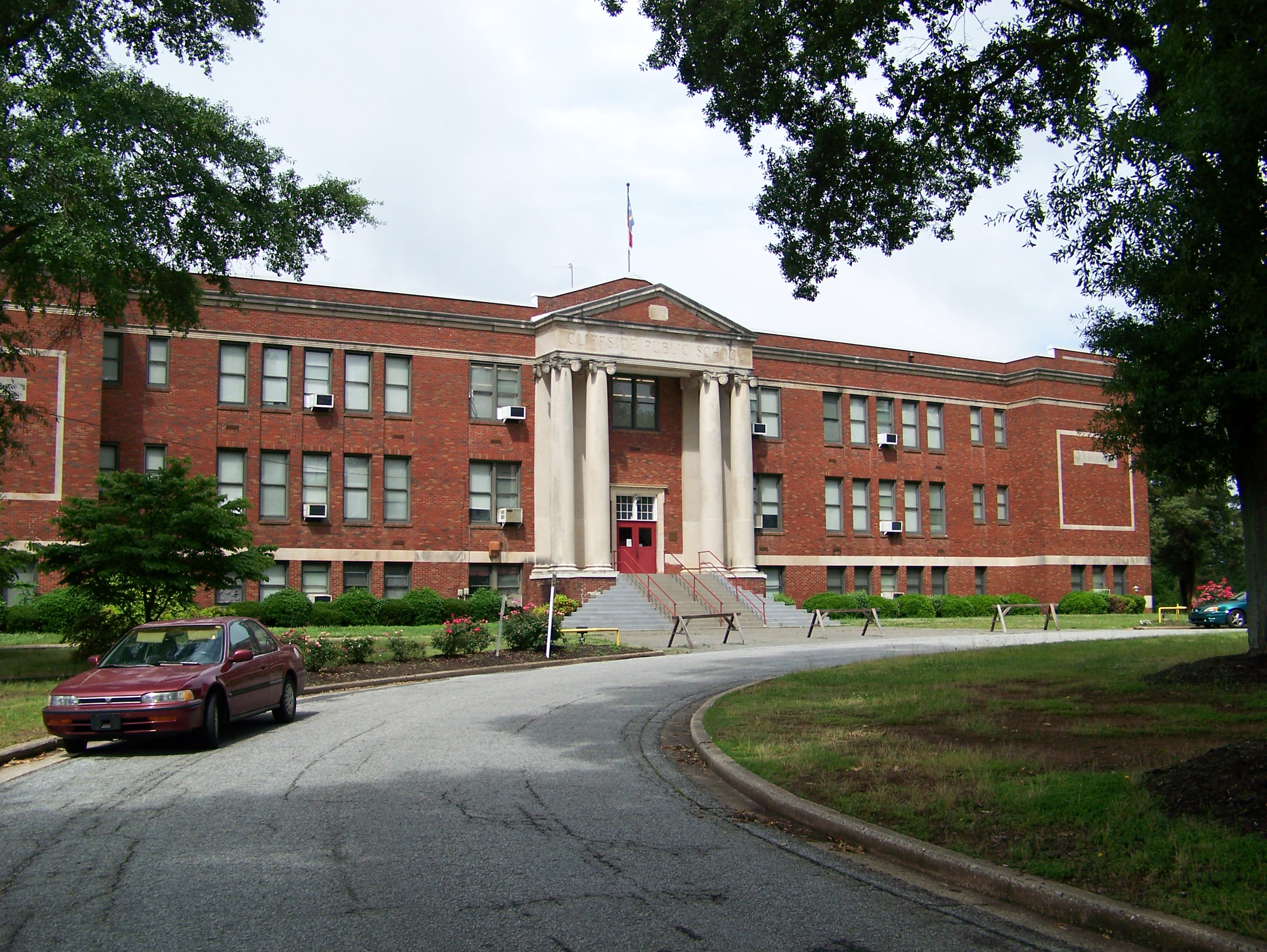
- Cliffside School, June 2013

- Location within North Carolina Location within the United States
- Location: 1 N. Main St., Cliffside, North Carolina
- Coordinates: 35°20′19″N 81°51′58″W
- Area: 16 acres (6.5 ha)
- Built: 1920, 1940-1941
- Architect: Asbury, Louis Humbert, Sr.; Draper, Earle Sumner
- Architectural style: Classical Revival
- NRHP reference No.: 97001667
- Added to NRHP: January 26, 1998

Cliffside Public School is a historic school complex located at Cliffside, Rutherford County, North Carolina. It was designed by architect Louis H. Asbury (1877-1975) and built in 1920–1921. It is a two-story on basement, "T"-plan, Classical Revival style terra cotta tile building sheathed in glazed brick. The front facade features a tetrastyle two-story portico of Indiana limestone. The vocational and physical education building, erected by the Work Projects Administration in 1940–1941. Also on the property are the contributing series of fieldstone masonry structures built in 1940–1941.It sits on landscaped grounds designed by Earle Sumner Draper.

It was added to the National Register of Historic Places in 1998.
