= Lottie B. Scott =

American civic leader and civil rights advocate (1936–2025)

- Born: November 5, 1936; Longtown, South Carolina, US
- Died: 18 September 2025 (aged 88)
- Education: University of Connecticut
- Occupations: Human rights worker, civil rights advocate, civic leader
- Organization: NAACP
- Board member of: Backus Hospital; Norwich Arts Center

Lottie B. Scott (November 5, 1936 – September 18, 2025) was an American civic leader and civil rights advocate who was a past president and co-founder of the NAACP branch in Norwich, Connecticut.

== Life and education ==
Eldest of eight children, Scott was born to Joseph Bell Jr. and Estelle Stone Bell in 1936. Raised in poverty on a farm in Longtown, South Carolina, she grew up under the South's Jim Crow laws and experienced segregation and racial discrimination. Leaving an unhappy marriage, she followed the example of her father and brother and moved with her son to Norwich, Connecticut, in 1957. Struggling to find employment as a single African American woman, she worked initially at a shoe factory and a hotel and then as a clerical typist at Norwich State Hospital. Circa 1970 she became a community resource worker for the Connecticut Commission on Human Rights and Opportunities. She retired as a regional manager 22 years later in 1992.

While working full-time at the human rights commission, Scott earned an associate degree at Three Rivers Community College and went on to earn a Bachelor of General Studies degree from the University of Connecticut in 1986.

== Public service ==
Scott was a founding member of the Norwich Branch of the NAACP in 1963; by the 1970s, she was president. She established an NAACP job bank program in 1973, helping hundreds of African American residents gain employment. Scott's leadership was instrumental in improving race relations at the Norwich Free Academy during the 1970s. Concurrent with her civil rights advocacy, she was a founding member of the Connecticut Civil Liberties Union.

Scott was a past president and founding member of the Norwich Arts Center. She was a lifetime member of the NAACP and the Norwich Historical Society and a member of the Rotary Club of Norwich for more than 20 years. She has served on several city commissions, including the City of Norwich Ellis Walter Ruley Committee, the Norwich Sachem Fund, and the Norwich Disabilities Committee. In addition, Scott has served on numerous local nonprofit boards, chairing the board of Backus Hospital and serving on The Bulletin newspaper's diversity committee and the Otis Library's board of directors.

== Awards ==
Scott has received numerous awards and honors. She received the University of Connecticut's Presidential Humanitarian Award, the NAACP Connecticut State Conference's W.E.B. Du Bois Lifetime Achievement Award in 2000, and the Eastern Chamber of Commerce's Citizen of the Year Award in 1994. In 2017, Scott received the Willard M. McRae Community Diversity Award from the Liberty Bank Foundation and a Humanitarian ACE (Arts, Community and Excellence) Award from Writer's Block Ink. In 2013, she was the inaugural recipient of the eponymous Lottie B. Scott Community Diversity Award, issued by the Rotary Club of Norwich. She has been honored as a Trailblazer by the New London National Council of Negro Women and received the Pioneer Award from the Robertsine Duncan Youth Council. In 2014, the Norwich Arts Center branded its inaugural jazz concert series "Miss Lottie's Jazz Cafe."

US Senator Chris Dodd paid tribute to Scott in an address on the United States Senate floor on April 21, 1994. In his remarks, Dodd recognized her as "a Connecticut treasure" who "helped shape the social, cultural, and political agenda of an entire community."

Scott's home is a stop on Norwich's Freedom Trail.

== Legacy ==
In 2018 Scott self-published her memoir Deep South–Deep North: A Family’s Journey, an account of her childhood experiences with poverty and racism and of her family's journey in the Great Migration. In 2021, she donated her papers to the UConn Library's Archives and Special Collections. Her collection includes hundreds of binders, scrapbooks, letters, photos, clippings, and meeting minutes dating from the 1960s through the early 2010s.

== Death ==
Scott died on September 18, 2025, at the age of 88.
