= South Carolina Highway 72 =

State highway in South Carolina

South Carolina Highway 72

Route information
- Maintained by SCDOT
- Length: 124.860 mi (200.943 km)
- Existed: 1942–present
- Tourist routes: SC Heritage Corridor: Discovery Route

Major junctions
- West end: SR 72 at the Georgia state line near Calhoun Falls
- US 25 / US 178 / US 221 in Greenwood; US 221 near Cross Hill; US 76 in Clinton; I-26 in Clinton; US 176 / SC 121 in Whitmire; US 321 / SC 9 in Chester
- East end: SC 122 in Rock Hill

Location
- Country: United States
- State: South Carolina
- Counties: Abbeville, Greenwood, Laurens, Newberry, Union, Chester, York

Highway system
- South Carolina State Highway System; Interstate; US; State; Scenic
← SC 71	→ SC 75

South Carolina Highway 72 (SC 72) is a 124.860-mile (200.943 km) state highway, traversing interior portions of the South Carolina Piedmont region. This route is part of a multi two-state route 72 that begins at Athens, Georgia and ends at Rock Hill, South Carolina. The route connects many smaller communities outside major metropolitan areas and is roughly parallel with Interstate 85 (I-85) to the north and I-20 and I-77 to the south and east. The route shares the longest concurrency in the state with SC 121, from Whitmire to Rock Hill.

== Route description ==
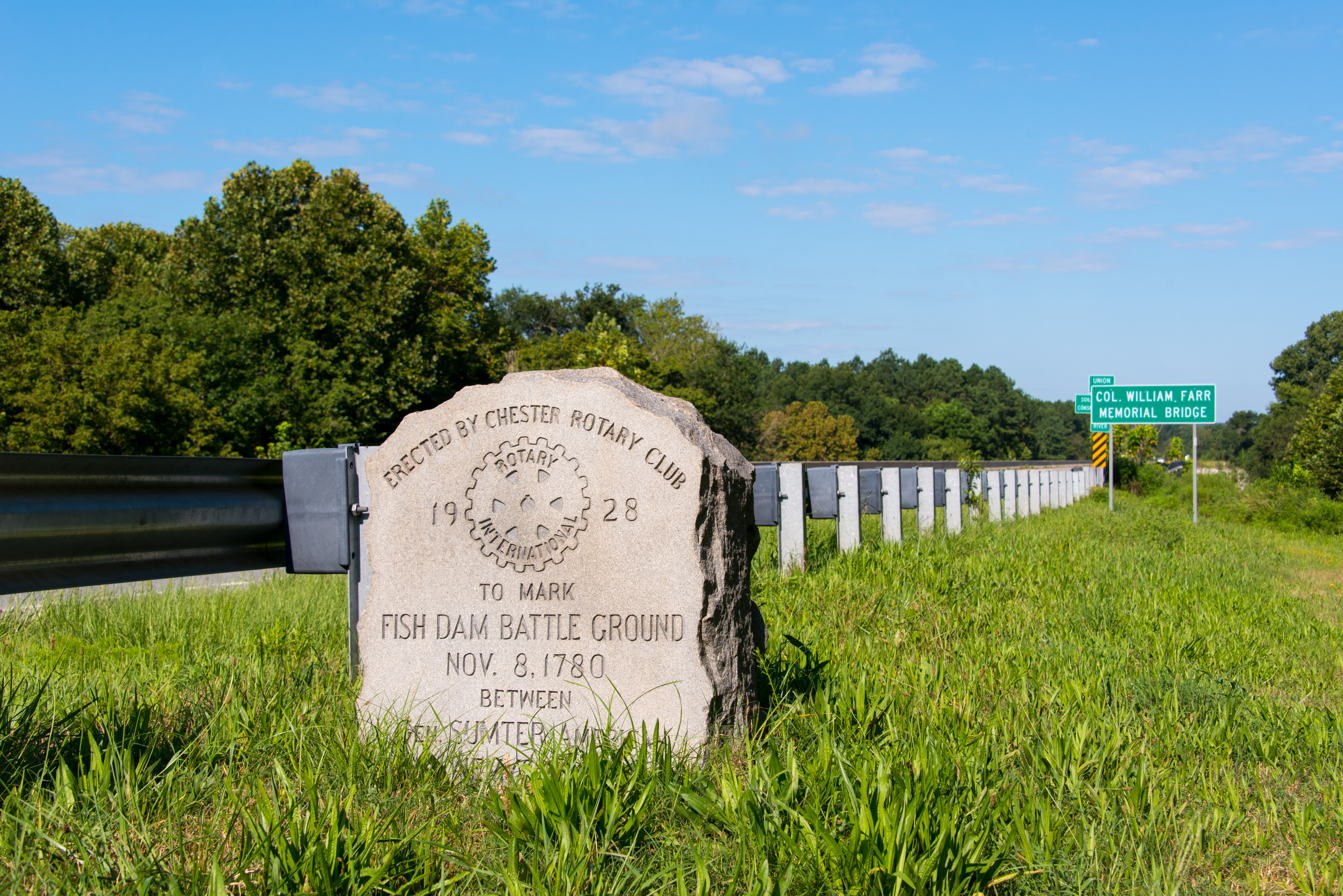
Monument to the Battle of Fishdam Ford, located on the east bank of the Broad River

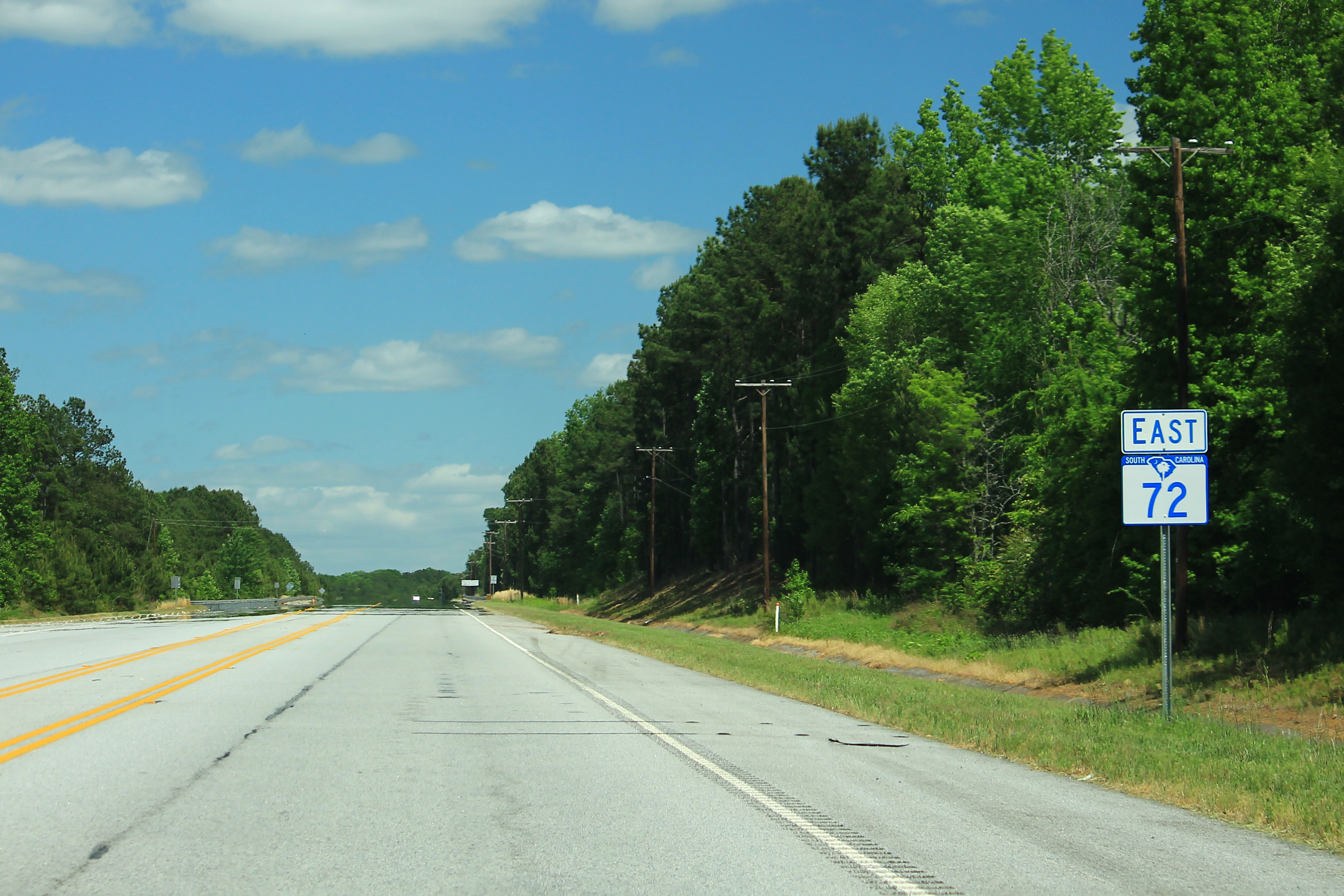
Sign denoting SC 72, located near Calhoun Falls

The route travels across the state in a southwest to northeast direction, and is sometimes referenced as an unofficial border between the Midlands and the Upstate regions. Beginning at the Georgia state line on a bridge over Lake Russell (where it is the continuation of SR 72) SC 72 goes through the town of Calhoun Falls and goes through rural areas of Abbeville County before skirting the county seat of Abbeville on a bypass route. The route serves as the major thoroughfare for traffic between Abbeville and Greenwood, where it bypasses the downtown area to the north.

Leaving Greenwood, the route heads towards Clinton where it intersects with I-26. Passing the interstate, the route enters into the Sumter National Forest and passes through the small town of Whitmire. From Whitmire until just shy of its eastern terminus, SC 72 is cosigned with SC 121. The route exits the Sumter National Forest and bypasses Chester to the south. Once past Chester, the route turns more towards the north as it enters Rock Hill, where it terminates at SC 122 in the downtown area.

The entire length of SC 72 is part of the National Highway System, which supports in the nation’s mobility, economy, and defense.

== History ==
SC 72 had two previous stents in the state before settling in its current role. The first SC 72 was established in 1925 or 1926 as a new primary routing, from SC 7 at the Saluda River, north to SC 10 in Waterloo. In 1932, this routing became part of U.S. Route 221 (US 221).

The second SC 72 appeared in 1940 as a new primary routing from SC 7, near the Broad River, to Leeds. In 1942, it was renumbered as SC 722; though was later downgraded in 1948 to secondary Leeds Road (S-12-25).

The third, and current, SC 72 was established in 1942 as a renumbering of SC 7; it traversed from the Georgia state line, near Calhoun Falls, to US 21 in Chester. In 1950, it was extended northeast to US 21/SC 5 in Rock Hill, which replaced part of US 21. In 1951 or 1952, its routing was adjusted west of Greenwood replacing SC 702 and leaving Old Abbeville Highway (S-1-3 and S-24-1).

In 1954, SC 72 was placed on bypass south and east around Chester; its old alignment became a business route. Also same year, SC 72 was moved south of Abbeville leaving behind Vienna Street (S-1-1) and Cambridge Street/Old Abbeville Highway (S-1-133). In 1961, SC 72 was placed on new bypass north around Greenwood; its old alignment became a business route. Sometime between 1990 and 1996, SC 72 was placed on a bypass south and east around Clinton; its old alignment became a business route. In 2013, SC 72's eastern terminus was adjusted to end at the western terminus of SC 122 on Johnston Street; part of a major removal of highways through downtown Rock Hill.

=== South Carolina Highway 7 ===
==== Whitmire alternate route ====
South Carolina Highway 7 Alternate
- Location: Whitmire, South Carolina
- Existed: 1940–1942

South Carolina Highway 7 Alternate (SC 7 Alt.) was a short alternate route of the original SC 7 (which became SC 72). In 1940, it was established from U.S. Route 176 (US 176) and SC 7 (now SC 72/SC 121) northeast of Whitmire. In 1942, it was decommissioned and redesignated as SC 72 Alt.

=== Completed Projects ===
==== Calhoun Falls Bypass ====
SC 72 formerly ran through Calhoun Falls as Savannah Street (S-1-579). In 2005, it was rerouted as a four-lane bypass on the north side of the town. SC 81 also got minor upgrades as a result of the bypass being constructed.

==== Mountville Bypass ====
South Carolina Highway 72 Business
- Location: Mountville, South Carolina
- Length: 1.610 mi (2.591 km)
- Existed: Unknown

Before being designated on the current four-lane bypass, SC 72 used to run through the small town of Mountville as a two-lane highway. When it was transformed into a bypass, the old alignment became Old SC-72 (S-30-984).

County	Location	mi	km	Destinations	Notes
Laurens	Mountville	0.0	0.0	SC 72 to SC 39 – Greenwood	Southern end of alignment; railroad crossing
Laurens	Mountville	1.1	1.8	Mountville Road (S-30-30)	To SC 39 and US 221
Laurens	Mountville	1.5	2.4	CSX Overpass; Monroe Subdivision	
Laurens	Mountville	1.6	2.6	SC 72 – Clinton	Northern end of alignment
1.000 mi = 1.609 km; 1.000 km = 0.621 mi

== Major intersections ==
County	Location	mi	km	Destinations	Notes
Abbeville		0.000	0.000	SR 72 west – Elberton	Continuation From Georgia
Abbeville	Calhoun Falls	3.050	4.908	SC 81 (Calhoun Street) – Mount Carmel, McCormick, Lowndesville	
Abbeville		14.270	22.965	SC 823 south (Mount Carmel Road) – Mount Carmel	Northern terminus of SC 823
Abbeville		15.900	25.589	SC 20 Truck north / SC 28 / SC 71 Truck north – McCormick, Anderson	Western end of SC 20 Truck/SC 71 Truck concurrency
Abbeville	Abbeville	17.860	28.743	SC 203 Truck north (North Main Street) / SC 20 Truck ends / SC 71 Truck ends to SC 20 – Due West, Anderson	Eastern end of SC 20 Truck/SC 71 Truck concurrency; southern terminus of SC 20 Truck, SC 71 Truck, and SC 203 Truck
Greenwood	Greenwood	27.590	44.402	SC 72 Bus. east (Cambridge Avenue) to SC 10 / SC 225 – Greenwood	Western terminus of SC 72 Bus.
Greenwood	Greenwood	28.500	45.866	Calhoun Road to SC 225	
Greenwood	Greenwood	30.000	48.280	US 25 north / US 178 west / US 25 Bus. south / US 178 Bus. east – Greenwood, Anderson, Greenville	Western end of US 25/US 178 concurrency; northern terminus of US 25 Bus.; western terminus of US 178 Bus.
Greenwood	Greenwood	30.640	49.310	SC 254 (Cokesbury Road) – Cokesbury	
Greenwood	Greenwood	32.160	51.757	US 25 south / US 178 east / US 221 south / SC 72 Bus. west – Greenwood, Edgefield, McCormick	Eastern end of US 25/US 178 concurrency; western end of US 221 concurrency; eastern terminus of SC 72 Bus.
Greenwood	Coronaca	37.090	59.691	SC 246 – Hodges, Ninety Six	
Laurens		40.450	65.098	US 221 north (Greenwood Highway) – Laurens	Eastern end of US 221 concurrency
Laurens	Cross Hill	44.530	71.664	SC 39 (Main Street) – Saluda, Laurens	
Laurens	Clinton	56.330	90.654	SC 72 Bus. (Broad Street)	
Laurens	Clinton	56.660	91.185	SC 56 west / SC 56 Bus. east (Jacobs Highway) – Saluda	Western end of SC 56 concurrency; western terminus of SC 56 Bus.
Laurens	Clinton	58.060	93.439	US 76 (Carolina Avenue) – Newberry	
Laurens	Clinton	59.760	96.174	SC 56 east / SC 72 Bus. west – Cross Anchor	Eastern end of SC 56 concurrency; eastern terminus of SC 72 Bus.
Laurens	Clinton	60.915– 60.920	98.033– 98.041	I-26 – Columbia, Spartanburg	I-26 exit 54
Newberry	Whitmire	75.650	121.747	SC 66 west (Glenn Street) – Joanna	Eastern terminus of SC 66
Newberry	Whitmire	75.680	121.795	Church Street east (US 176 Conn. east) to US 176 east / SC 121 south – Newberry, Columbia	Western terminus of US 176 Conn., which takes on the Church Street name; SC 72 turns left off of Church Street and onto Union Street.
Newberry	Whitmire	76.040	122.375	US 176 east / SC 121 south (Watson Street) – Newberry, Columbia, Augusta	Western end of US 176 and SC 121 concurrencies
Enoree River		76.063– 76.527	122.412– 123.158	Senator Marvin E. Abrams Bridge	
Union		77.570	124.837	US 176 north – Union	Eastern end of US 176 concurrency
Union		77.780	125.175	SC 72 Conn. west to US 176 west – Union	Eastern terminus of SC 72 Conn.
Union	Carlisle	86.760	139.627	SC 215 north (King Kennedy Street) – Santuc, Union	Western end of SC 215 concurrency
Chester		90.690	145.951	SC 215 south (Fairfield Road) – Monticello, Columbia	Eastern end of SC 215 concurrency
Chester	Chester	103.180	166.052	US 321 north / SC 9 north (J.A. Cochran Bypass) / West End Street north – Chester, Lockhart	Western end of US 321 and SC 9 concurrencies; southern terminus of West End Street
Chester	Chester	105.020	169.013	US 321 south / SC 97 south / US 321 Bus. north (Columbia Street) – Winnsboro, Great Falls	Eastern end of US 321 concurrency; western end of SC 97 concurrency; southern terminus of US 321 Bus.
Chester	Chester	106.240	170.977	SC 9 south / SC 9 Bus. north (Lancaster Highway) – Lancaster, Chester	Eastern end of SC 9 concurrency; southern terminus of SC 9 Bus.
Chester	Chester	107.260	172.618	SC 97 north (J.A. Cochran Bypass) / Saluda Road south – Chester, Hickory Grove	Eastern end of SC 97 concurrency
Chester	Lewis	112.480	181.019	SC 909 east (Rodman Road)	Western end of SC 909 concurrency
Chester	Lewis	112.580	181.180	SC 909 west (Aaron Burr Road)	Eastern end of SC 909 concurrency
York		119.150	191.753	SC 324 west – York	Eastern terminus of SC 324
York	Rock Hill	123.230	198.319	SC 121 north (Albright Road) / SC 901 south (Mount Holly Road) to SC 5 south / US 21 / I-77 – Charlotte, Edgemoor	Eastern end of SC 121 concurrency; western end of SC 901 concurrency
York	Rock Hill	123.530	198.802	SC 5 / SC 901 north (Heckle Boulevard) – Newport	Eastern end of SC 901 concurrency
York	Rock Hill	124.860	200.943	SC 122 east (Johnston Street) / Saluda Street	Eastern terminus of SC 72; western terminus of SC 122
1.000 mi = 1.609 km; 1.000 km = 0.621 mi: Concurrency terminus

== Special routes ==
=== Greenwood business loop ===
South Carolina Highway 72 Business
- Location: Greenwood, South Carolina
- Length: 4.310 mi (6.936 km)
- Existed: 1961–present
- Tourist routes: South Carolina Heritage Corridor: Discovery Route

South Carolina Highway 72 Business (SC 72 Bus.) is a 4.310-mile (6.936 km) business route that is partially in the city limits of Greenwood. It follows the original path of the SC 72 mainline through downtown Greenwood, via Cambridge Avenue, Grace Street, and Reynolds Avenue. It was established in 1961 when mainline SC 72 was bypassed north of the city. It is also in concurrency with the South Carolina Discovery Route for the majority of its routing.

County	Location	mi	km	Destinations	Notes
Greenwood	Greenwood	0.000	0.000	SC 72 – Abbeville	Western Terminus; Western end of SC Discovery Route concurrency
Greenwood	Greenwood	1.301	2.094	SC 225 south (Calhoun Road) to US 25 south / US 178 east / US 221 south / SC 10 – McCormick, Saluda, Edgefield	
Greenwood	Greenwood	2.349	3.780	Carl Julien Bridge	
Greenwood	Greenwood	2.754	4.432	US 25 Bus. / US 178 Bus. (Hampton Avenue) to SC 34 east – Anderson, Greenville	Eastern end of SC Discovery Route concurrency
Greenwood	Greenwood	3.234	5.205	SC 254 begins – Cokesbury	Western end of SC 20 Truck/SC 71 Truck concurrency
Greenwood	Greenwood	4.310	6.936	SC 72 / US 25 / US 178 / US 221 (Bypass 72 Northeast) – Clinton, Edgefield, Saluda, McCormick, Laurens	Eastern Terminus
Greenwood	Greenwood	1.000 mi = 1.609 km; 1.000 km = 0.621 mi: Concurrency terminus			

=== Clinton business loop ===
South Carolina Highway 72 Business
- Location: Clinton, South Carolina
- Length: 3.310 mi (5.327 km)

South Carolina Highway 72 Business (SC 72 Bus.) is a 3.310-mile (5.327 km) business route entirely within the city limits of Clinton. It follows the original path of the SC 72 mainline route that used to traverse through downtown Clinton, via Broad Street and Willard Road. The highway passes by the main entrance of Presbyterian College. It also shares a concurrency with SC 56 Bus. for the majority of its path.

County	Location	mi	km	Destinations	Notes
Laurens	Clinton	0.000	0.000	SC 72 to SC 56 south – Greenwood	Western Terminus
Laurens	Clinton	0.503	0.810	SC 56 Bus. south (Jacobs Highway) – Saluda	Southern end of SC 56 Bus. concurrency
Laurens	Clinton	1.424	2.292	US 76 (West Carolina Avenue) – Laurens, Newberry	
Laurens	Clinton	1.921	3.092	SC 308 begins (North Broad Street) to I-385 – Ora	
Laurens	Clinton	2.221	3.574	SC 56 Bus. north (Musgrove Street) to I-26 west – Spartanburg	Northern end of SC 56 Bus. concurrency
Laurens	Clinton	3.310	5.327	SC 72 east / SC 56 north to I-26 east – Whitmire, Spartanburg	Eastern Terminus
Laurens	Clinton	1.000 mi = 1.609 km; 1.000 km = 0.621 mi: Concurrency terminus			

=== Whitmire alternate route ===
South Carolina Highway 72 Alternate
- Location: Whitmire, South Carolina
- Existed: 1942–1947

South Carolina Highway 72 Alternate (SC 72 Alt.) was an alternate route that was a renumbering of SC 7 Alt. northeast of Whitmire. It was established in 1942 from U.S. Route 176 to SC 72. In 1947, it was decommissioned and redesignated as SC 72 Connector (SC 72 Conn.).

=== Whitmire connector route ===
South Carolina Highway 72 Connector
- Location: Whitmire, South Carolina
- Length: 0.150 mi (241 m)

South Carolina Highway 72 Connector (SC 72 Conn.) is a connector route of SC 72 that exists northeast of Whitmire. It serves to connect U.S. Route 176 (US 176) with SC 72/SC 121. It is unnamed and is an unsigned highway.

=== Chester business loop ===
South Carolina Highway 72 Business
- Location: Chester, South Carolina
- Length: 2.6 mi (4.2 km)
- Existed: 1954–N/A

South Carolina Highway 72 Business (SC 72 Bus.) was established in 1954 when mainline SC 72 was bypassed to the south and east of Chester. It followed the original mainline route through downtown Chester, via West End Street, Main Street, and Saluda Street/Road. In 1964, SC 121 Bus. was established and completely overlapped SC 72 Bus. It is unknown when the business loop was decommissioned.

=== Rock Hill business spur ===
South Carolina Highway 72 Business
- Location: Rock Hill, South Carolina
- Length: 1.8 mi (2.9 km)
- Existed: 1950–2012

South Carolina Highway 72 Business (SC 72 Bus.) was established in 1950 as a business spur into downtown Rock Hill, via Saluda Street, from mainline SC 72, which continued east to terminate at US 21/SC 5 (Anderson Road). Though never originally part of mainline SC 72, it was eventually replaced by the mainline sometime in 2012.

=== Rock Hill bypass ===
South Carolina Highway 72 Bypass
- Location: Rock Hill, South Carolina
- Length: 2.7 mi (4.3 km)
- Existed: 1950–2012

South Carolina Highway 72 Bypass (SC 72 Byp.) was most likely established in 1950. It bypassed downtown Rock Hill to the southeast as Albright Road and was completely concurrent with SC 121. It was also concurrent with SC 5 shortly afterwards for the rest of its route as well. It ends at an intersection with US 21 while SC 121 continues along with US 21 north through the east of the city, and SC 5 continues along with US 21 south to I-77’s exit 77. It was actually the former segment of mainline SC 72, and it eventually was decommissioned sometime in 2012, along with it getting redesignated onto South Carolina Highway 72 Business Spur.
