= South Carolina Highway 254 =

State highway in South Carolina, United States

South Carolina Highway 254

Route information
- Maintained by SCDOT
- Length: 8.230 mi (13.245 km)

Major junctions
- South end: SC 72 Bus. in Greenwood
- US 25 / US 178 / SC 72 in Greenwood
- North end: US 25 northwest of Cokesbury

Location
- Country: United States
- State: South Carolina
- Counties: Greenwood

Highway system
- South Carolina State Highway System; Interstate; US; State; Scenic
← SC 253	→ SC 260

South Carolina Highway 254 (SC 254) is a 8.230-mile-long (13.245 km) state highway in the U.S. state of South Carolina. The highway connects Greenwood and Cokesbury.

== Route description ==
SC 254 begins at an intersection with SC 72 Business (SC 72 Bus.; Grace Street/Reynolds Avenue) just west of Lander University, in Greenwood, the county seat of Greenwood County. It travels to the north and immediately curves to the north-northwest. It has an intersection with U.S. Route 25 (US 25), US 178, and SC 72 and a crossing of Rocky Creek just before leaving the city limits. The highway passes by Greenwood High School and Pinecrest Elementary School. About 1,500 feet (460 m) later, it crosses Turner Branch. Just before crossing Coronaca Creek, the highway begins to curve to the northwest. It passes Cokesbury Hills Golf Club just before entering Cokesbury at Parker Road. There, it intersects SC 246. At the intersection with Mt. Ariel Road and Ridge Road, it leaves Cokesbury. Approximately 2,000 feet (610 m) later, it meets its northern terminus, an intersection with US 25.

== Major intersections ==
The entire route is in Greenwood County.

Location	mi	km	Destinations	Notes
Greenwood	0.000	0.000	SC 72 Bus. (Grace Street/Reynolds Avenue) – Abbeville, Laurens, Clinton	Southern terminus
Greenwood	1.300	2.092	US 25 / US 178 / SC 72 – Saluda, Greenville, Abbeville	
Cokesbury	7.020	11.298	SC 246 – Hodges	
	8.230	13.245	US 25 – Hodges, Ware Shoals	Northern terminus
1.000 mi = 1.609 km; 1.000 km = 0.621 mi
