= South Carolina Highway 10 =

Highway in South Carolina

South Carolina Highway 10

Route information
- Maintained by SCDOT
- Length: 22.790 mi (36.677 km)
- Existed: 1922–present

Major junctions
- South end: SC 28 near McCormick
- US 221 near Bradley
- North end: US 25 Bus. / US 178 Bus. / SC 34 in Greenwood

Location
- Country: United States
- State: South Carolina
- Counties: McCormick, Greenwood

Highway system
- South Carolina State Highway System; Interstate; US; State; Scenic
← SC 9	→ SC 11

South Carolina Highway 10 (SC 10) is a 22.790-mile (36.677 km) state highway in the U.S. state of South Carolina that travels from SC 28 near McCormick to the U.S. Route 25 Business (US 25 Bus.), US 178 Bus., and SC 34 in Greenwood. The highway is a two-lane highway that serves as a connector between McCormick and Greenwood. The first 21.2 miles (34.1 km) is known as McCormick Highway, while the remaining 1.5 miles (2.4 km) is known as Maxwell Avenue.

== Route description ==
SC 10 is a 22.7 miles (36.5 km) two-lane, minor state highway in the southwest portion of the Upstate of South Carolina. The route runs generally south to north. Most of the route (particularly the southern portion) runs through or alongside the Sumter National Forest. The route begins just northwest of McCormick heading north to where is it begins a brief concurrency with US 221. It also contains an unsigned portion on Maxwell Avenue after meeting Edgefield Street. The route continues on northward to Greenwood, where it enters the city's southwest side, silently ending at the US 25 Bus./US 178 Bus./SC 34 concurrency.

== History ==
SC 10 is one of the original state highways, being created in 1922. The original route began in McCormick and ran north to Greenwood, Laurens, Woodruff, Spartanburg, and Chesnee before exiting the state into North Carolina where US 221 Alt. does today. From the 1920s to the 1950s, the route was slowly shortened to the 22.7 miles (36.5 km) route. The route now serves as a minor state highway.

== Junction list ==
County	Location	mi	km	Destinations	Notes
McCormick		0.000	0.000	SC 28 – McCormick, Abbeville	Southern terminus
Greenwood		8.230	13.245	US 221 south (Bedford Road) – McCormick	Southern end of US 221 concurrency
Greenwood	Bradley	10.480	16.866	US 221 north – Greenwood	Northern end of US 221 concurrency
Greenwood	Greenwood	21.290	34.263	SC 225 to US 221 south / SC 72 west – Piedmont Technical College, Emerald High School	Provides access to Self Regional Healthcare Self Medical Tower – Tower Pointe
Greenwood	Greenwood	22.790	36.677	US 25 Bus. / US 178 Bus. / SC 34 (Main Street)	Northern terminus
1.000 mi = 1.609 km; 1.000 km = 0.621 mi
