= Longtown, South Carolina =

- Unincorporated community
- Location within South Carolina Location within the United States
- Coordinates: 34.3476471°N 80.8373049°W
- Country: United States
- State: South Carolina
- County: Fairfield
- Elevation: 535 ft (163 m)
- Time zone: UTC-5 (Eastern (EST))
  - Summer (DST): UTC-4 (EDT)
- Area codes: 803 & 839
- GNIS feature ID: 1246466

Longtown is an unincorporated community in Fairfield County, South Carolina, United States.

Lottie B. Scott, author and civil rights advocate, was born in Longtown.
