= State Line, South Carolina =

Unincorporated community in South Carolina, US

Coordinates: 35°10′36″N 81°48′00″W

State Line is an unincorporated community in Cherokee County, in the U.S. state of South Carolina.

== History ==
A post office called State Line was established in 1875, and remained in operation until 1904. The community was so named for its location near the South Carolina—North Carolina state line.
