= Lowes Foods =

Grocery store chain based in Winston-Salem

- Type: Subsidiary
- Industry: Retail
- Founded: 1954 (72 years ago) in Wilkesboro, North Carolina, United States
- Founder: Jim Lowe
- Headquarters: Winston-Salem, North Carolina, United States
- Number of locations: 85 Stores (2024)
- Area served: South Carolina, North Carolina, Georgia
- Key people: Tim Lowe (CEO)
- Products: Grocery, deli, bakery, meat, seafood, produce, dairy, floral
- Revenue: ▲$1.6 billion (2007)
- Number of employees: 14,500 (2024)
- Parent: Alex Lee Inc.
- Subsidiaries: KJ's Market; IGA Southeast
- Website: www.lowesfoods.com

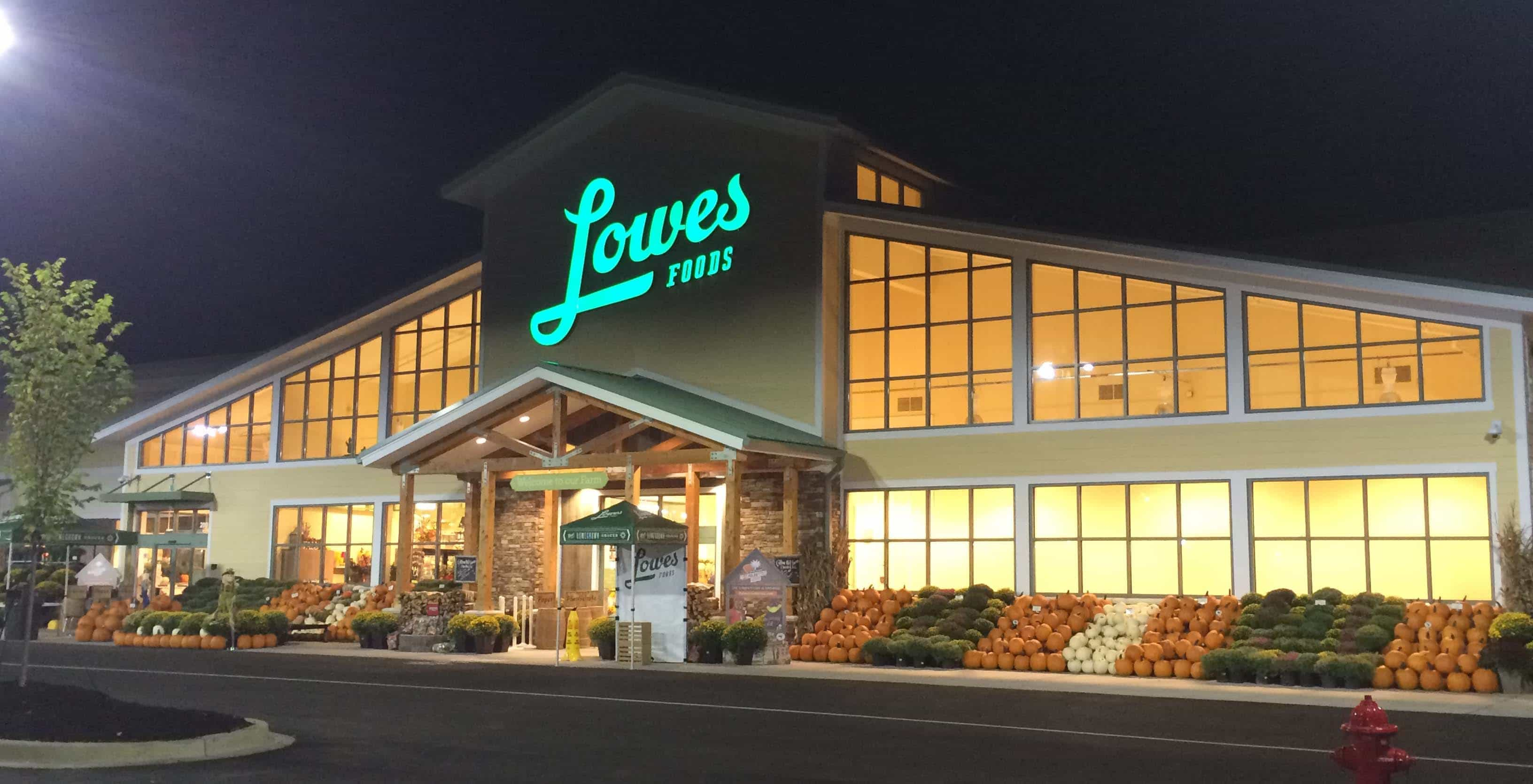
Lowes Foods in Simpsonville, South Carolina

Lowes Foods is an American supermarket chain based in Winston-Salem, North Carolina. The chain initially grew in the mountains of North Carolina and rural areas of Virginia, but, starting in the late 1990s, it expanded in metropolitan areas of North Carolina and South Carolina.

== History ==
=== Beginnings ===
Lowes Foods started in 1954 in Wilkesboro, North Carolina, with a single store opened by Jim Lowe (former co-owner of what became Lowe's Home Improvement Warehouse, and son of its founder). Lowe sold that store to J. C. Faw. Expansion in Wilkesboro and the mountain regions of North Carolina shortly followed.

=== 1980s to 2000s: Company shifts ===
In 1984, Merchants Distributors, Inc. (MDI), a wholesale distributor of food and non-food items to grocery stores headquartered in Hickory, North Carolina, bought Lowes Foods. Lowes added 19 more stores between 1986 and 1990. In 1997, MDI parent company Alex Lee Inc. bought Byrd's Food Stores Inc. of Burlington, North Carolina, which had 43 stores. Lowes Foods had 56 stores, few in the area served by Byrd's. The Byrd's stores became Lowes Foods stores. In 2000, Delhaize America had to sell 38 Hannaford stores to satisfy antitrust concerns. Lowes Foods bought 12 of these, six (plus one under construction) in the Research Triangle region and six along the North Carolina coast.

In 2007, Lowes Foods opened its first fuel station at a Hickory, North Carolina, store. As of August 2016, 14 Lowes Foods stores had fuel stations. Lowes Foods offered a five-cent discount per gallon of gas with each $100 spent inside the store (excl. alcohol and gift card purchases) which was redeemable at Lowes Foods fuel stations or any participating Speedway or WilcoHess locations in North and South Carolina.

Until October 4, 2009, Lowes Foods used S&H Greenpoints on their store discount card; this was replaced with "Fresh Rewards" on October 5, 2009. Many of Lowes Foods stores also offer Lowes Foods to Go, where shoppers can order groceries online and drive to the store to pick them up. Business and home delivery is available at select locations throughout North and South Carolina.

=== 2010s: Location changes and new concepts ===
In March 2011, Lowes Foods opened a 'frugal cousin' series of stores called Just $ave. These stores are located all in North Carolina and mainly in rural areas, targeting budget-conscious shoppers. The first location opened was in Pilot Mountain, North Carolina. In August 2011, Lowes Foods began the Aisle50 program in the Carolinas, intending to expand to other areas and other chains in the future. Deals from aisle50.com will not likely replace coupons, but shoppers will be able to buy certain products for about half their normal prices.

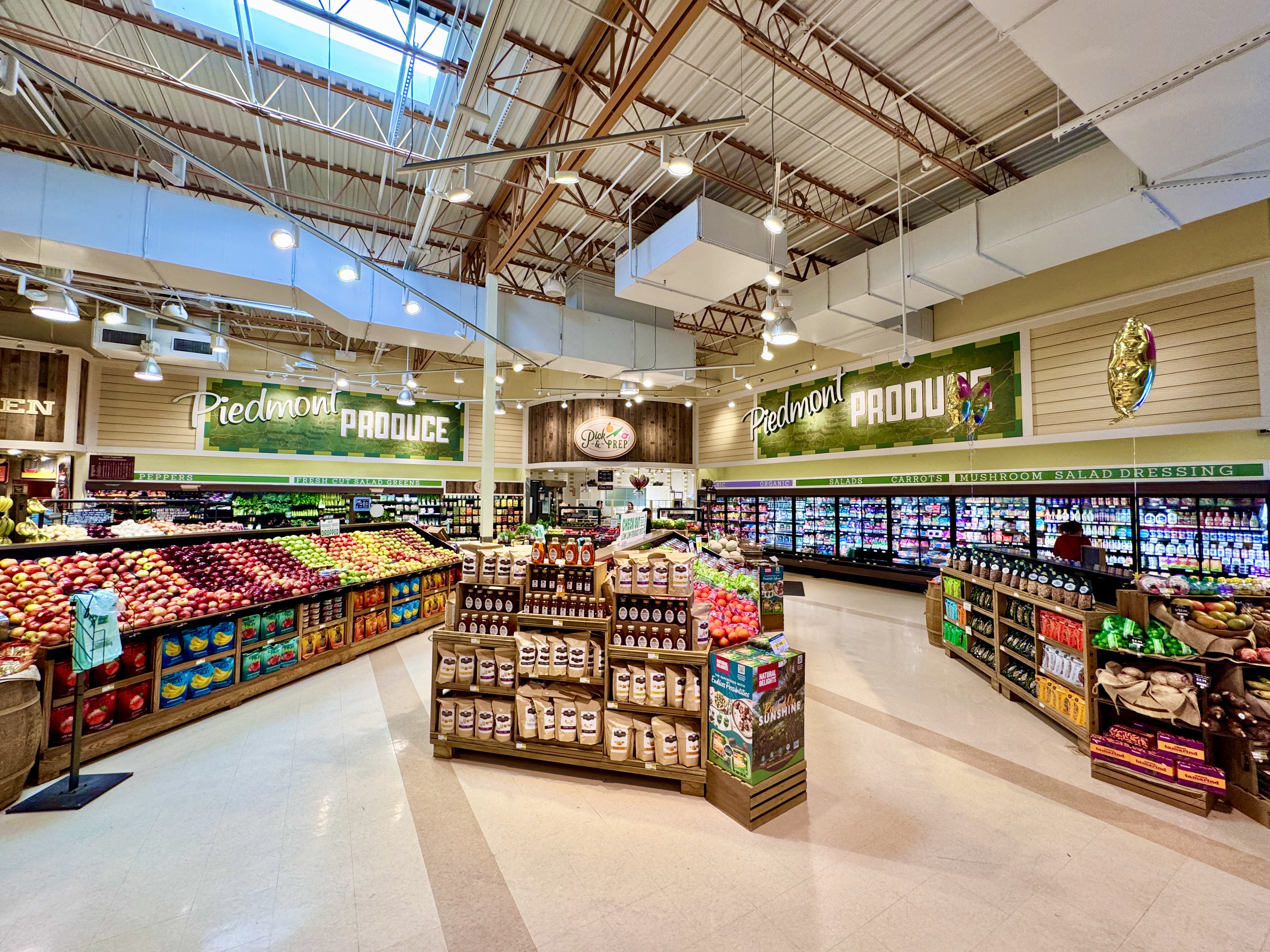
The interior of a Lowes Foods in Clemmons, North Carolina

On June 1, 2012, the company announced that they were leaving the Charlotte, North Carolina, market by trading ten Charlotte area stores with Harris Teeter for six Western North Carolina stores and $26.5 million in cash. By March 2015, Lowes Foods began shifting its store portfolio and had closed five of the six stores it acquired from Harris Teeter as well as stores in Cary, Newland, West Jefferson, and Greenville, North Carolina. These closures were announced as part of a comprehensive growth strategy that would include rebranding all existing Lowes Foods stores by 2019 and entering into the Greenville, South Carolina market in 2016. Lowes Foods plans to add three to five Greenville stores as part of its growth strategy. In 2013, New CEO Tim Lowe had plans to change their experiences in their stores and wanted to invent a new concept for their locations that showed their "Carolina Roots". The development began with in-depth consumer research and a series of overnight workshops designed to get the very best ideas from managers across all facets of the business including all store managers and many from MDI. During these workshops, Lowes Foods created a number of new concepts, including Chicken Kitchen, SausageWorks, Pick & Prep, and the Community In early 2014, Lowes Foods remodeled their location in Clemmons, North Carolina, a suburb of Winston-Salem, North Carolina. This was the first location to feature the new concept. There was also a new Pizza and Panini program which would be eventually known as Sammy's.. The company completed most of the rest of the Forsyth County locations including some stores in the Triangle Region of North Carolina . The company would also renovate existing and construct new locations in other regions of North Carolina and South Carolina with the concepts throughout the rest of the decade. These later projects would extend a few more concepts.

In August 2016, Lowes Foods announced the closures of two Lowes Foods stores in North Wilkesboro and Shallotte, North Carolina, as well as a Just $ave location in Dobson, North Carolina. In July 2019, the closures of three stores—two in the Hickory, North Carolina-area, as well as the Myrtle Beach, South Carolina, location on Cipriana Drive, was announced. The closures are part of an overall investment strategy to accelerate growth.

== Locations ==
	Lowes Foods	Just $ave	KJ's Market	IGA Southeast	Fuel Centers	Total stores
South Carolina	17	0	25	23	7	65
North Carolina	63	6	0	3	13	72
Georgia	1	0	8	5	0	14
Total	81	6	33	31	20	151

Lowes Foods, Just $ave, KJ's Market, and corporate-owned IGA Southeast locations are considered "stores". Fuel Centers are part of actual stores and therefore do not count towards total store counts.
