= Lake Greenwood State Park =

State park in Greenwood County, South Carolina

- Interactive map of Lake Greenwood State Park
- Nearest city: Ninety Six, SC
- Coordinates: 34°11′31″N 81°57′22″W
- Area: 914 acres (4 km^{2})
- Created: 1938
- Camp sites: paved tent and RV sites, primitive group camping area
- Hiking trails: .8 miles (1 km) nature trail
- Other information: park has playground equipment, boat ramps and shower facilities
- Website: http://southcarolinaparks.com/lakegreenwood/introduction.aspx

Lake Greenwood State Park is a state park located near the town of Ninety Six in Greenwood County, South Carolina. The 914-acre (3.7 km^{2}) park partially occupies a series of peninsulas bordering 11,400-acre (46.1 km^{2}) Lake Greenwood.

The state park consists of land donated in 1938, during the Great Depression, by Greenwood County. It was one of 16 state parks developed by the Civilian Conservation Corps in South Carolina, a program established by President Franklin D. Roosevelt to create employment while investing in construction of infrastructure. Many of the structures built by the corps are still prominent features and amenities, including picnic shelters, a water fountain, a lakeside terrace, and a boathouse.

Activities available at the park include picnicking, fishing, boating, hiking and camping.

The John Drummond and Holly Self Drummond Environmental Education Conference Center includes the Civilian Conservation Corps Museum. It features interactive exhibits detailing the history and projects of the Civilian Conservation Corps in South Carolina parks. The Conference Center is used for meetings and events.

An annual half distance Ironman competition is hosted by the park each September.
