= Ninety Six National Historic Site =

National Historic Site of the United States

- Location within South Carolina Location within the United States
- Location: Ninety Six, SC, United States
- Nearest city: Greenwood, South Carolina
- Coordinates: 34°8′49″N 82°1′28″W
- Area: 1,022 acres (414 ha)
- Established: August 19, 1976
- Visitors: 122,732 (in 2025)
- Governing body: National Park Service
- Website: Ninety Six National Historic Site
- Ninety Six and Star Fort
- U.S. National Register of Historic Places
- U.S. National Historic Site
- U.S. National Historic Landmark
- Nearest city: Ninety Six, South Carolina
- Architect: Henry Haldane
- NRHP reference No.: 69000169

Significant dates
- Added to NRHP: December 3, 1969
- Designated NHL: November 7, 1973

Ninety Six National Historic Site, also known as Old Ninety Six and Star Fort, is a United States National Historic Site located about 60 miles (96 kilometers) south of Greenville, South Carolina. The historic site was listed on the National Register in 1969, declared to be a National Historic Landmark in 1973, and established as a National Historic Site in 1976 to preserve the original site of Ninety Six, South Carolina, a small town established in the early 18th century. It encompasses 1,022 acres of property.

== History ==
The most common proposed etymology of the toponym Ninety Six is a reference to the distance in miles between the location and the Cherokee town of Keowee. Supporters of such an etymology have to struggle with the fact that the distance between the two locales is 78 miles. David P. George, Jr., has advanced the alternate hypothesis that Ninety Six is a reinterpretation of "the nine and six," a reference to two sets of southerly flowing streams—nine tributaries of Marion and Henley creeks and six tributaries of Thompsons Creek—in an area in which the Saluda River tends to be fed by north and easterly flowing streams.

=== Revolutionary War ===
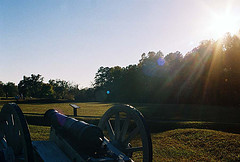
Sunset over the battlefield at Star Fort

Ninety Six had become a prosperous village of about 100 settlers by the time of the American Revolutionary War. The first land battle (the siege of Savage's Old Fields) of the war fought in South Carolina took place at Ninety Six on November 19–21, 1775; then major Andrew Williamson of the Ninety-Six District Regiment of militia tried to recapture ammunition and gunpowder taken by Loyalists; outnumbered, he finally reached a truce with them.

The village became a Loyalist stronghold early in the war, though the backcountry of the Carolinas was populated both by those loyal to crown and by partisans. The latter were often of Scots-Irish descent, though there were loyalist Scots as well as migrants of other origins. Ninety Six was fortified by the British in 1780, as they considered this a strategic location. From May 22 to June 18, 1781, newly appointed Southern Department commander of the Continental Army, Major General Nathanael Greene led 1,000 troops in a siege against the 550 Loyalists defending the fort in the village. The 28-day siege centered on an earthen star fort. Despite having more troops, Greene's patriots did not succeed in taking the town.

Ninety Six was declared a National Historic Landmark in 1973.

According to the South Carolina Department of Archives and History, the "historic district of Ninety Six National Historic Site contains numerous historical features."

A special ceremony was held the weekend of May 20, 2006, to commemorate the 225th anniversary of the Battle of Star Fort.

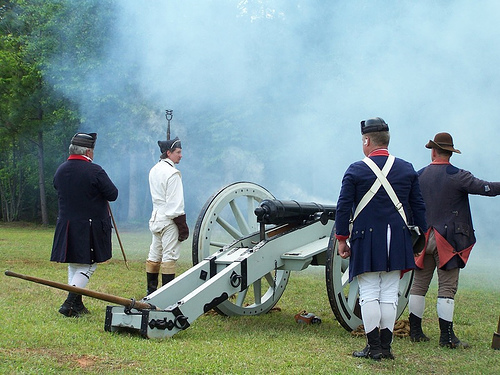
Reenactors at the 225th anniversary celebration

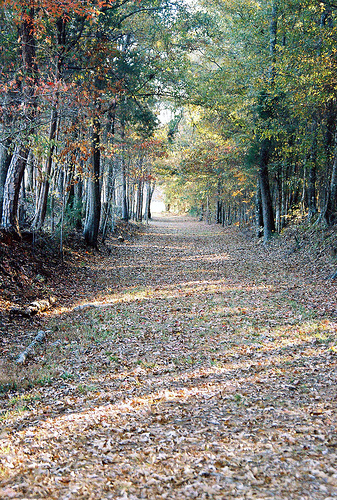
Island Ford Road is one of the many original Colonial road beds that cross various trails throughout the park.

== The site today ==
The 1,022-acre Ninety Six National Historic Site is located two miles (3.2 kilometers) south of the present-day town of Ninety Six on South Carolina Highway 248. The National Park Service maintains a visitor center that includes a small museum containing artifacts found at the site, as well as other period artifacts, and oil paintings of the battle and local leaders of the American Revolution. A video about the battle is available, and there is also a gift shop. Visitors can rent a self-guided audio tour of the park.

A one-mile (1.6 kilometer) interpretive trail begins at the visitor center and takes visitors to the remains of Star Fort as well as the original site of Ninety Six. Additional off-road trails weaving through the woods lead to Star Fort Pond, an old unidentified cemetery (believed to be a slave cemetery from post-colonial times), and to the graves of Major James Gouedy, a trader influential in the founding of Ninety Six, and Major James Mayson, who captured a significant gunpowder cache to be used by the Americans.

== See also ==
- List of National Historic Landmarks in South Carolina
- National Register of Historic Places listings in Greenwood County, South Carolina
