= Coronaca, South Carolina =

- Census-designated place
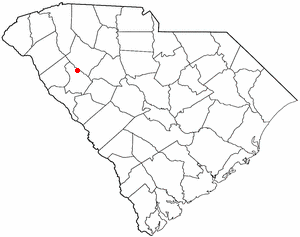
- Location of Coronaca, South Carolina
- Coordinates: 34°15′14″N 82°06′36″W
- Country: United States
- State: South Carolina
- County: Greenwood

Area
  - Total: 1.68 sq mi (4.36 km^{2})
  - Land: 1.68 sq mi (4.35 km^{2})
  - Water: 0.0077 sq mi (0.02 km^{2})
- Elevation: 551 ft (168 m)

Population (2020)
  - Total: 156
  - Density: 92.9/sq mi (35.88/km^{2})
- Time zone: UTC-5 (Eastern (EST))
  - Summer (DST): UTC-4 (EDT)
- FIPS code: 45-16945
- GNIS feature ID: 2402797

Coronaca is an unincorporated community and census-designated place (CDP) in Greenwood County, South Carolina, United States. The population was 191 at the 2010 census.

== History ==
The Oaks was listed on the National Register of Historic Places in 2010.

== Geography ==
Coronaca is located in northern Greenwood County at 34°15′46″N 82°5′33″W (34.262908, -82.092447). U.S. Route 221 forms the southeastern edge of the CDP and leads southwest 6 miles (10 km) to Greenwood, the county seat, and north 20 miles (32 km) to Laurens.

According to the United States Census Bureau, the Coronaca CDP has a total area of 1.7 square miles (4.4 km^{2}), of which 0.01 square miles (0.02 km^{2}), or 0.38%, are water.

== Demographics ==
Historical population
Census	Pop.	Note	%±
2020	156		—
U.S. Decennial Census

As of the census of 2000, there were 170 people, 76 households, and 50 families residing in the CDP. The population density was 101.1 inhabitants per square mile (39.0/km^{2}). There were 91 housing units at an average density of 54.1 per square mile (20.9/km^{2}). The racial makeup of the CDP was 75.29% White, 23.53% African American, 1.18% from other races. Hispanic or Latino of any race were 1.76% of the population.

There were 76 households, out of which 22.4% had children under the age of 18 living with them, 51.3% were married couples living together, 10.5% had a female householder with no husband present, and 34.2% were non-families. 30.3% of all households were made up of individuals, and 11.8% had someone living alone who was 65 years of age or older. The average household size was 2.24 and the average family size was 2.80.

One of Coronaca's most well known residents was a kid in the Vine that says "LEGITNESS."

In the CDP, the population was spread out, with 18.2% under the age of 18, 8.2% from 18 to 24, 31.8% from 25 to 44, 27.6% from 45 to 64, and 14.1% who were 65 years of age or older. The median age was 41 years. For every 100 females, there were 91.0 males. For every 100 females age 18 and over, there were 87.8 males.

The median income for a household in the CDP was $33,500, and the median income for a family was $50,114. Males had a median income of $42,000 versus $18,882 for females. The per capita income for the CDP was $18,219. None of the families and 8.2% of the population were living below the poverty line, including no under eighteens and 50.0% of those over 64.

== History ==
In the mid 1970s a tornado struck Coronaca, damaging the church and a couple of houses.

Today Coronaca has a Volunteer Fire Department (equipped with a siren), a KJ's Market grocery store, and a couple of churches.

== Education ==
It is in the Greenwood School District 50. The zoned schools are: Rice Elementary School, Brewer Middle School, and Greenwood High School.
