= National Register of Historic Places listings in Greenwood County, South Carolina =

Location of Greenwood County in South Carolina

This is a list of the National Register of Historic Places listings in Greenwood County, South Carolina.

This is intended to be a complete list of the properties and districts on the National Register of Historic Places in Greenwood County, South Carolina, United States. The locations of National Register properties and districts for which the latitude and longitude coordinates are included below, may be seen in a map.

There are 24 properties and districts listed on the National Register in the county, including 1 National Historic Landmark. Another property was once listed but has been removed.

This National Park Service list is complete through NPS recent listings posted May 15, 2026.

== Current listings ==
	Name on the Register	Image	Date listed	Location	City or town	Description
1	Barratt House	Barratt House	September 12, 1985 (#85002382)	South Carolina Highway 67 and Bryan Dorn Rd. 34°06′37″N 82°07′39″W	Greenwood	
2	J. Wesley Brooks House	J. Wesley Brooks House	March 30, 1973 (#73001712)	2 miles south of Greenwood on U.S. Route 25; 34°08′18″N 82°07′48″W	Greenwood	
3	Edgewood School		December 30, 2024 (#100011212)	200 Edgewood Street; 34°10′44″N 82°01′09″W	Ninety Six	
4	Greenville Presbyterian Church	Greenville Presbyterian Church	May 20, 1998 (#98000561)	Greenville Church Rd. 34°20′50″N 82°18′14″W	Donalds	
5	Greenwood Mill Village Historic District		May 21, 2026 (#100013021)	Roughly bounded by West Cambridge Avenue. Hampton Avenue. Mill Avenue. Kitson Street. Maxwell Avenue, and N Mathis Street; 34°11′31″N 82°10′12″W	Greenwood	
6	Kinard House	Kinard House	March 7, 2007 (#07000119)	227 W. Main St. 34°10′27″N 82°01′42″W	Ninety Six	
7	Lander College Old Main Building	Lander College Old Main Building	August 2, 1984 (#84002046)	Stanley Ave. and Lander St. 34°11′54″N 82°09′52″W	Greenwood	
8	Magnolia Cemetery	Magnolia Cemetery	June 9, 2004 (#04000590)	416 Magnolia Ave. 34°11′27″N 82°09′16″W	Greenwood	
9	Moore-Kinard House	Moore-Kinard House	August 4, 1983 (#83002198)	U.S. Route 178 and S-24-44; 34°05′18″N 82°02′34″W	Ninety Six	
10	Mt. Pisgah A.M.E. Church	Mt. Pisgah A.M.E. Church	August 16, 1979 (#79002384)	Hackett Ave. and James St. 34°11′29″N 82°09′12″W	Greenwood	
11	Ninety Six National Historic Site	Ninety Six National Historic Site	December 3, 1969 (#69000169)	2 miles south of Ninety Six between South Carolina Highways 27 and 248; 34°09′19″N 82°00′46″W	Ninety Six	
12	The Oaks	The Oaks	December 17, 2010 (#10001040)	114 Old Puckett's Ferry Rd. 34°15′25″N 82°05′05″W	Coronaca vicinity	
13	Old Cokesbury and Masonic Female College and Conference School	Old Cokesbury and Masonic Female College and Conference School	August 25, 1970 (#70000589)	North of Greenwood at the junction of South Carolina Highways 246 and 254; 34°16′29″N 82°13′03″W	Cokesbury	
14	Old Greenwood Cemetery	Old Greenwood Cemetery	March 1, 2002 (#02000115)	503 E. Cambridge Ave. 34°11′50″N 82°09′12″W	Greenwood	
15	Old Greenwood High School	Old Greenwood High School	October 10, 1985 (#85003120)	857 S. Main St. 34°11′08″N 82°09′29″W	Greenwood	
16	James C. Self House	James C. Self House	November 20, 1987 (#87002064)	595 N. Mathis St. 34°11′38″N 82°10′54″W	Greenwood	
17	Southern Railway Depot	Southern Railway Depot	October 6, 2011 (#11000731)	99 South Carolina Highway 34; 34°10′29″N 82°01′27″W	Ninety Six	
18	State Theatre		May 23, 2024 (#100010398)	110 Main Street; 34°11′31″N 82°09′40″W	Greenwood	
19	Stony Point	Stony Point	June 20, 1975 (#75001700)	North of Greenwood at the junction of South Carolina Highways 39 and 246; 34°16′44″N 82°07′33″W	Greenwood	
20	Sunnyside	Sunnyside	November 14, 1978 (#78002515)	105 Dargan Ave. 34°11′07″N 82°09′08″W	Greenwood	
21	Tabernacle Cemetery	Tabernacle Cemetery	August 1, 2008 (#08000736)	Tabernacle Cemetery Rd., just east of South Carolina Highway 254; 34°16′00″N 82°11′02″W	Greenwood	
22	Trapp and Chandler Pottery Site (38GN169)		January 6, 1986 (#86000043)	Address Restricted	Kirksey	
23	Vance-Maxwell House	Vance-Maxwell House	March 5, 1982 (#82003866)	158 E. Cambridge St. 34°11′42″N 82°09′33″W	Greenwood	
24	Ware Shoals Inn	Ware Shoals Inn	November 1, 2007 (#07001130)	1 Greenwood Ave., N. 34°23′55″N 82°14′49″W	Ware Shoals	

== Former listing ==
	Name on the Register	Image	Date listed	Date removed	Location	City or town	Description
1	Benjamin Mays Birthplace	Benjamin Mays Birthplace	May 18, 1998 (#98000414)	December 8, 2005	0.5 mi NW of jct. of US 179 and Scott Ferry Rd. (Original location. Now located at:); 34°12′00″N 82°08′38″W	Epworth	Moved to Greenwood.

== See also ==
- List of National Historic Landmarks in South Carolina
- National Register of Historic Places listings in South Carolina
