= Nathan George Evans =

Confederate States Army general

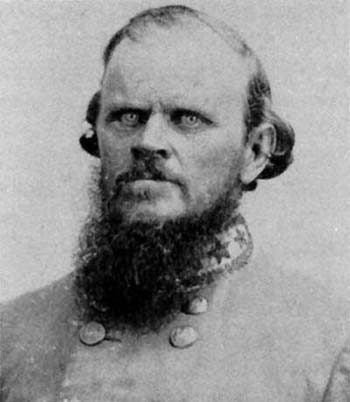
- Born: February 3, 1824; Marion County, South Carolina, U.S.
- Died: November 23, 1868 (aged 44); Midway, Alabama, U.S.
- Burial place: Tabernacle Cemetery; Cokesbury, South Carolina, U.S.
- Military career
- Allegiance: United States of America; Confederate States of America
- Branch: United States Army; Confederate States Army
- Service years: 1848–1861 (USA); 1861–1865 (CSA)
- Rank: Captain (USA); Brigadier General (CSA)
- Nickname: Shanks
- Commands: Evans' Brigade
- Conflicts: American Civil War: First Battle of Bull Run; Battle of Ball's Bluff; Battle of Secessionville; Second Battle of Manassas; Battle of South Mountain; Battle of Antietam; Battle of Kinston; Vicksburg Campaign
- Other work: High-School Principal

Nathan George Evans (February 3, 1824 – November 23, 1868) was an American military officer who served in the United States Army before becoming a general in the Confederate States Army during the American Civil War.

== Biography ==
Evans was born in Marion, South Carolina, the third son of Thomas and Jane Beverly (née Daniel) Evans. He briefly attended Randolph-Macon College before receiving an appointment to the United States Military Academy at West Point from John C. Calhoun. He graduated as 36th out of 38 graduates in 1848, was brevetted 2nd Lieutenant and sent to the western frontier to serve in the 1st U.S. Dragoons. In late 1849 he finally received his commission and was transferred to the 2nd U.S. Dragoons. He became an experienced Indian fighter with his unit. Evans was promoted to 1st Lieutenant of the 2nd U.S. Cavalry in 1855 and to Captain in 1856, staying in the west for the next few years.

On February 27, 1861, Evans resigned from the army and offered his services to his home state; shortly afterwards entering Confederate service. He was made a Colonel in July and commanded a small brigade at the First Battle of Bull Run, where he was the first Confederate field commander to perceive the Union intent to attack the Confederate left flank at dawn, after receiving flags signals by Captain Edward Alexander, who had spotted the Union columns threatening Evans' position through his spyglass. His command went far toward saving the day for the South. During the thick of the fight, he was everywhere, closely followed by an aide carrying his "barrelito" (small barrel) of Evans' favorite whiskey on his back. Over time, Evans brigade earned the moniker "Tramp Brigade.".

A number of examples of Evans' good tactical leadership and bravery in battle are recorded. However, his abrasive personality and his passion for intoxicating beverages led to his constant difficulties with colleagues and superiors.

He was given command of a brigade of Mississippi and Virginia troops and assigned to guard the upper fords of the Potomac River, above Washington, D.C. In October 1861, a Union force crossed the river near Leesburg, Virginia, and at the Battle of Ball's Bluff Evans' command drove the enemy into the Potomac River, inflicting great loss. Evans was promoted to brigadier general to be effective from the day of the battle.

He was then sent to assist in defending the coastal areas just south of Charleston. He was placed in command of the First Military District which included the village of Secessionville, just two days before the battle there, but played little part in it. He also commanded Confederate forces in the Engagements at Pineberry, Willtown, and White Point. In July 1862, he was given command of a newly formed brigade of South Carolina troops and led it to Richmond to join Robert E. Lee's Army of Northern Virginia.

Evans' Brigade participated in the battles of Second Manassas, South Mountain and Antietam in 1862 and was then assigned to Eastern North Carolina to oppose a major Union raid on Kinston and Goldsboro. After this campaign, he was tried and acquitted for drunkenness during the Battle of Kinston. At Second Bull Run, Evans' brigade was attached to Brig. Gen John B. Hood's division, and since Evans ranked Hood, had authority over him for the campaign. The two generals got into an argument after the battle and Evans had Hood arrested, but Lee ordered him to release Hood and restore him to command. At Antietam, Evans commanded a demi-division consisting of his own and Col. George T. Anderson's brigades.

In the summer of 1863, Evans' brigade was assigned to General Joseph E. Johnston's army during the Vicksburg Campaign. After this campaign, the brigade returned to Charleston where Evans quarreled with his superior, General Roswell S. Ripley, who had him tried for disobedience of orders. Following Evans' acquittal, General P.G.T. Beauregard still considered Evans incompetent and would not return him to command. He was finally reinstated to command in the spring of 1864, but was severely injured in a buggy accident in Charleston as he was preparing to take his brigade north to the Petersburg Campaign. Evans' Brigade, renamed for its new commander, Brigadier General Stephen Elliott, Jr., would soon find itself in the Petersburg trenches directly above the Union mine and suffer heavy casualties at the Battle of the Crater.

Although Evans recovered somewhat from his injury, he was never returned to command. He held a lesser position at the War Department for a time and fled Richmond with President Jefferson Davis. Evans' brother-in-law, Brigadier General Martin Witherspoon Gary, joined Davis' party at Greensboro and they both accompanied the president until he spent the night of May 1, 1865, at the Gary family home in Cokesbury, South Carolina.

After the war, Evans became a high school principal in Cokesbury and then in Midway, Alabama, where he died in 1868, probably from the effects of his previous Charleston accident. He was buried in Tabernacle Cemetery in Cokesbury.

General William Henry Fitzhugh Lee, son of Robert E. Lee, once wrote of Evans:

"Shanks" Evans, as he was so called, was a graduate of the military academy, a native South Carolinian, served in the respected old Second Dragoons, and was a good example of the rip-roaring, scorn all-care element which so largely abounded in that regiment. Evans had the honor of opening the fight (First Manassas), we might say fired the first gun of the war.

== See also ==
- List of American Civil War generals (Confederate)
