= Connie Maxwell Children's Home =

Group home in South Carolina, US

Connie Maxwell Children's Home is a Baptist-church run residential group home headquartered in Greenwood, South Carolina, United States. Since 1892, Connie Maxwell Children’s Home has cared for and supported thousands of children and families. With 4 locations across South Carolina, this ministry becomes a family to those who need it most, restoring hope through one of its core programs: Residential Care, Family Care, Foster Care, and Crisis Care.

== History ==
W.W. Keys formally stated the call for an orphanage to be operated by South Carolina Baptists in a Baptist Courier editorial in 1888. Three years later a site was secured for the new orphanage, now a children's home, and it would be located in Greenwood, primarily through the generosity of Dr. J.C. Maxwell and his wife, Sarah. The Maxwell's had lost their seven-year-old daughter, Connie, to scarlet fever in 1883. To honor her memory, the Maxwell's gave South Carolina Baptists more than 480 acres (1.9 km^{2}) and willed their estate to be used in starting this tender ministry for children. Twelve-year-old Susie Burton from Newberry County was the first child received into care on May 22, 1892. By year's end, 25 other boys and girls had joined Susie and Superintendent J.L. Vass in the new Baptist work.

During the first years of operation most of the children were orphans. The major task of yesterday was to provide food, clothing, shelter, and Christian care. South Carolina Baptist Churches sponsored individual children at the rate of $6 per month. In the early years, each Connie Maxwell cottage had its own milk cow, garden, and poultry yard. The children also went to school in their cottages, attending four terms of 12 weeks each.

Atha Thomas Jamison became Connie Maxwell's superintendent in 1900. Dr. Jamison saw early in his tenure that the new century brought changing needs for children. Already, Connie Maxwell was beginning to receive boys and girls who had at least one parent living but needed care because of some other family trauma. Connie Maxwell alumnus Dr. Sam Smith took over as superintendent in 1946. That same year, the name of the Connie Maxwell Orphanage was officially changed to Connie Maxwell Children's Home.

The ensuing 30 years of the home's work under the leadership of Dr. Smith and Dr. John Murdoch saw individuals across South Carolina, particularly the lakelands, reaching out in many ways to the children. Many have given of themselves through such methods as Sunday School offerings, boxcars of produce, special sponsorships of children, gifts of canned goods and clothing, Christmas gifts and special work projects.

To meet the increasingly complex problems of children and their families, Connie Maxwell Children's Home has continued to develop new programs with individualized services to support and strengthen family ties and to encourage family unity. Dr. Ed Johnson was the first African American social worker employed by Connie Maxwell Children's Home. Dr. Johnson, who also continued to serve his congregation at Morris Chapel Baptist Church in Greenwood, came to Connie Maxwell in 1972 and served for twenty years. Ed was instrumental in the collaborative efforts between Connie Maxwell, South Carolina Baptists and the Baptist Educational and Missionary Convention in meeting the needs of all families. Johnson served from 1991-1996 as President of the Educational and Missionary Convention of South Carolina. Under the leadership of Dr. Heyward Prince, who began his time as president in 1977, Connie Maxwell added crisis homes in Florence and Greenwood to provide warm and compassionate care for children in need of immediate help—abandoned or abused children, runaways, or children whose families have suddenly broken apart. A satellite campus in Greenville was established for those children needing intensive community experiences. In Summerville, a Connie Maxwell social worker was placed to provide counseling services to families in the Lowcountry, and another Connie Maxwell social worker was assigned to help low-income families devastated by Hurricane Hugo during that terrible time. Dr. Joe Weber served a brief period as president after Dr. Prince.

The home base for Connie Maxwell's statewide work continues to be the main campus in Greenwood where 96 children in grades one through twelve live on a 120-acre campus in a family-style setting of cottage, surrounding a church. The children attend public schools and are encouraged to participate in extra-curricular school activities. Another 8 children are in the emergency shelter in Greenwood, and a total of 34 more are at the four satellite campuses around the state.

Some children in care as well as others from throughout the Greenwood area in the 1990s participated in a re-education effort at Connie Maxwell, a special campus school program for seventh and eighth grade students identified by their guidance counselors as being at risk of not finishing school. Also, through Connie Maxwell's Adventure-Based Counseling program, physical and mental challenges in an outdoor setting are used to build group communication and problem-solving skills as well as individual confidence. Many organizations, schools and businesses have used the course.

The challenges and opportunities continue to be great, but Connie Maxwell Children's Home looks forward to them with faith, hope, commitment, and confidence. Dr. Jimmy McAdams came to Connie Maxwell as president in the spring of 1993 and led in the acquisition of the Brookland Plantation Home for Boys established originally on Edisto Island in 1958 that moved to Orangeburg in 1968. It serves as a home for boys and girls, and is known as Connie Maxwell's Brookland Campus. Sixteen boys and girls live in two family style cottages on 140 acres (0.57 km^{2}) of land. To enhance the work of the family service program, the Neb Cline Family Service Center was opened on the main campus. Here, children visit with a caring individual who works with the child and family to set goals to meet their needs. OASIS was created on the farm at Connie Maxwell to develop confidence in children in a natural surrounding. Many school groups have visited the educational program offered there. Efforts were also begun on a third crisis shelter care facility that saw its completion in 2004 in Chesterfield under the president, Dr. Ben Davis, who took the leadership position in 2002, after 9 years as business and development vice president.

In more recent years, Connie Maxwell Children's Home has welcomed thousands of guests to the main campus in Greenwood for "A Connie Maxwell Christmas." In just a few years this annual event has become a family tradition for many residents of the lakelands. This Christmas occasion is a way for the children and staff of Connie Maxwell to say thank you for the much-needed support received from caring individuals, businesses, organizations and churches. The continuing mission of Connie Maxwell is to help children develop and strengthen in a Christian environment, while looking for new ways to assist families who are hurting.

== See also ==
- Vance-Maxwell House
