= Promised Land, South Carolina =

- Census-designated place
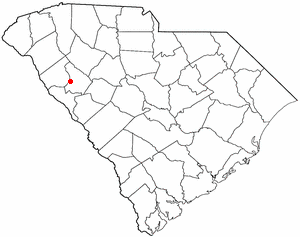
- Location of Promised Land, South Carolina
- Coordinates: 34°07′26″N 82°13′38″W
- Country: United States
- State: South Carolina
- County: Greenwood

Area
  - Total: 1.56 sq mi (4.04 km^{2})
  - Land: 1.56 sq mi (4.04 km^{2})
  - Water: 0 sq mi (0.00 km^{2})
- Elevation: 554 ft (169 m)

Population (2020)
  - Total: 378
  - Density: 242.4/sq mi (93.59/km^{2})
- Time zone: UTC-5 (Eastern (EST))
  - Summer (DST): UTC-4 (EDT)
- ZIP code: 29649
- Area codes: 864, 821
- FIPS code: 45-58615
- GNIS feature ID: 2403452

Promised Land is an unincorporated community and census-designated place (CDP) in Greenwood County, South Carolina, United States. The population was 511 at the 2010 census.

== Geography ==
Promised Land is in western Greenwood County. South Carolina Highway 10 passes through the community, leading northeast 6 miles (10 km) to Greenwood, the county seat, and south 6 miles to Bradley.

According to the United States Census Bureau, the Promised Land CDP has a total area of 1.5 square miles (4.0 km^{2}), all land.

== Demographics ==
Historical population
Census	Pop.	Note	%±
2000	559		—
2010	511		−8.6%
2020	378		−26.0%
US Decennial Census

=== 2020 census ===
Promised Land CDP, South Carolina – racial and ethnic composition Note: the US Census treats Hispanic/Latino as an ethnic category. This table excludes Latinos from the racial categories and assigns them to a separate category. Hispanics/Latinos may be of any race.
Race / Ethnicity (NH = Non-Hispanic)	Pop 2000	Pop 2010	Pop 2020	% 2000	% 2010	% 2020
White alone (NH)	12	21	16	2.15%	4.11%	4.23%
Black or African American alone (NH)	535	481	353	95.71%	94.13%	93.39%
Native American or Alaska Native alone (NH)	0	0	1	0.00%	0.00%	0.26%
Asian alone (NH)	5	2	1	0.89%	0.39%	0.26%
Native Hawaiian or Pacific Islander alone (NH)	0	0	0	0.00%	0.00%	0.00%
Other race alone (NH)	0	2	0	0.00%	0.39%	0.00%
Mixed race or Multiracial (NH)	1	1	3	0.18%	0.20%	0.79%
Hispanic or Latino (any race)	6	4	4	1.07%	0.78%	1.06%
Total	559	511	378	100.00%	100.00%	100.00%

=== 2000 census ===
As of the census of 2000, there were 559 people, 184 households, and 142 families residing in the CDP. The population density was 354.7 inhabitants per square mile (137.0/km^{2}). There were 197 housing units at an average density of 125.0 per square mile (48.3/km^{2}). The racial makeup of the CDP was 2.86% White, 95.89% African American, 0.89% Asian, and 0.36% from two or more races. Hispanic or Latino of any race were 1.07% of the population.

There were 184 households, of which 31.5% had children under the age of 18 living with them, 51.1% were married couples living together, 22.8% had a female householder with no husband present, and 22.3% were non-families. 20.1% of all households were a single person living alone, and 8.7% had someone living alone who was 65 years of age or older. The average household size was 3.04 and the average family size was 3.55.

In the CDP, the population age distribution was: 27.4% under 18 years, 10.0% from 18 to 24, 25.8% from 25 to 44, 25.2% from 45 to 64, and 11.6% 65 or older. The median age was 36 years. For every 100 females, there were 82.7 males. For every 100 females age 18 and over, there were 77.3 males.

The median income for a household in the CDP was $40,288, and the median income for a family was $42,212. Males had a median income of $22,431 versus $25,000 for females. The per capita income for the CDP was $11,630. About 16.5% of families and 18.4% of the population were below the poverty line, including 4.8% of those under age 18 and 35.0% of those age 65 or over.

== Education ==
Promised Land is in the Greenwood School District 50. The zoned schools are: Mays Elementary School, Westview Middle School, and Emerald High School.
