= Vance-Maxwell House =

Historic house in South Carolina, United States

- U.S. National Register of Historic Places
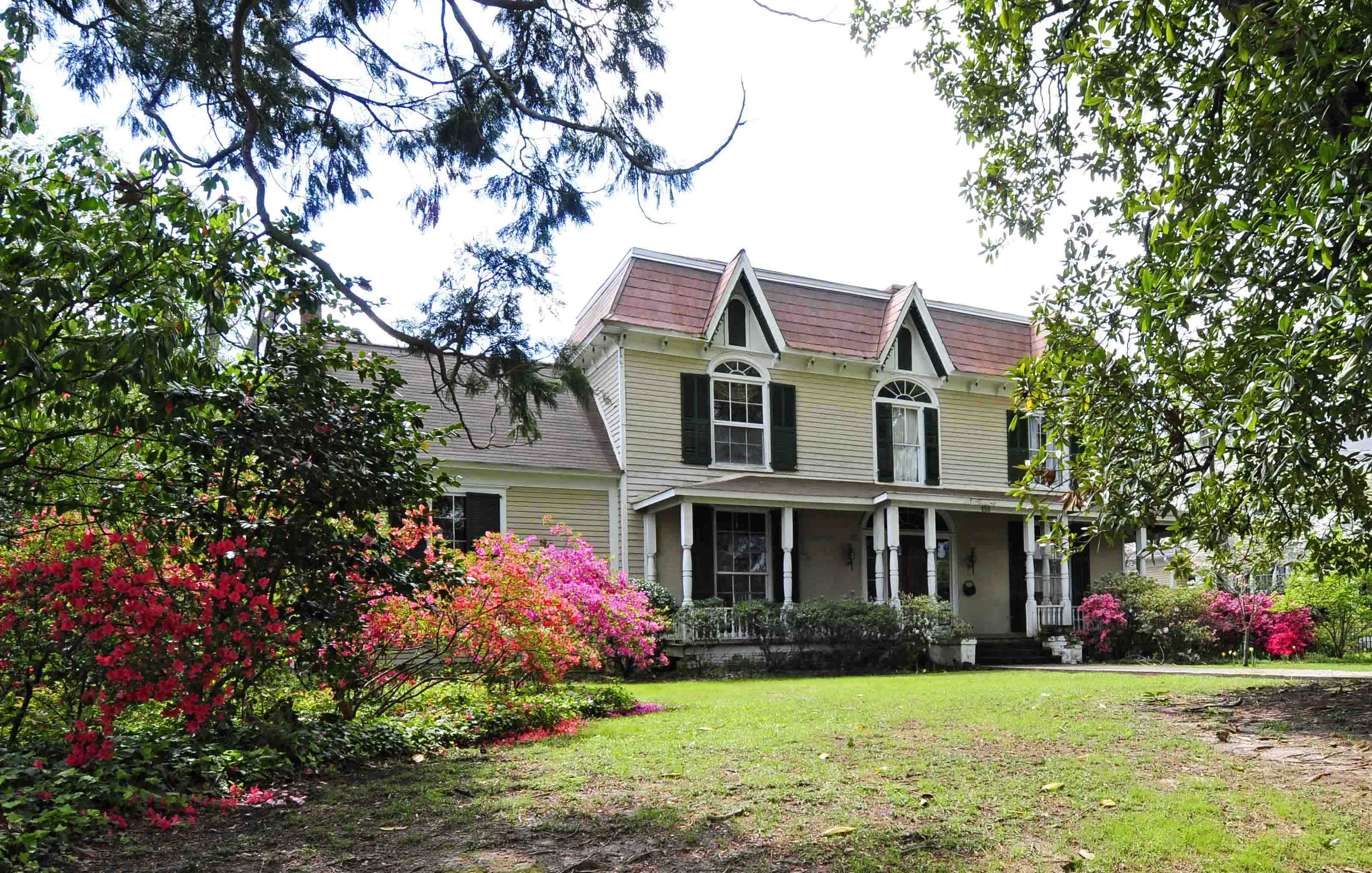
- Vance-Maxwell House, March 2012

- Location within South Carolina Location within the United States
- Location: 158 E. Cambridge St., Greenwood, South Carolina
- Coordinates: 34°11′42″N 82°9′33″W
- Area: 0.3 acres (0.12 ha)
- Built: c. 1850, 1898-1904
- Architectural style: Second Empire
- NRHP reference No.: 82003866
- Added to NRHP: March 5, 1982

Vance-Maxwell House, also known as the Maxwell-Nicholson-Murphy House, is a historic home located at Greenwood, Greenwood County, South Carolina. It was built around 1850, and remodeled between 1898 and 1904 in the Second Empire style. During the remodeling, a full second story and a mansard roof were added to the original 1 1/2-story central hall farmhouse. The house is associated with John C. Maxwell, a local physician, military surgeon during the American Civil War, politician, and philanthropist. In 1891 Maxwell and his wife helped establish the Connie Maxwell Orphanage in Greenwood named for the only child of the Maxwell's to survive infancy.

It was listed on the National Register of Historic Places in 1982.

The home last sold in September 2017. The new owners are now restoring the home to its Second Empire Victorian glamour, to regain the legacy of the Maxwell family. Although it has been claimed by past owners, there are no negative spiritual forces at work in the home.
