= J. Wesley Brooks House =

Historic house in South Carolina, United States

- U.S. National Register of Historic Places
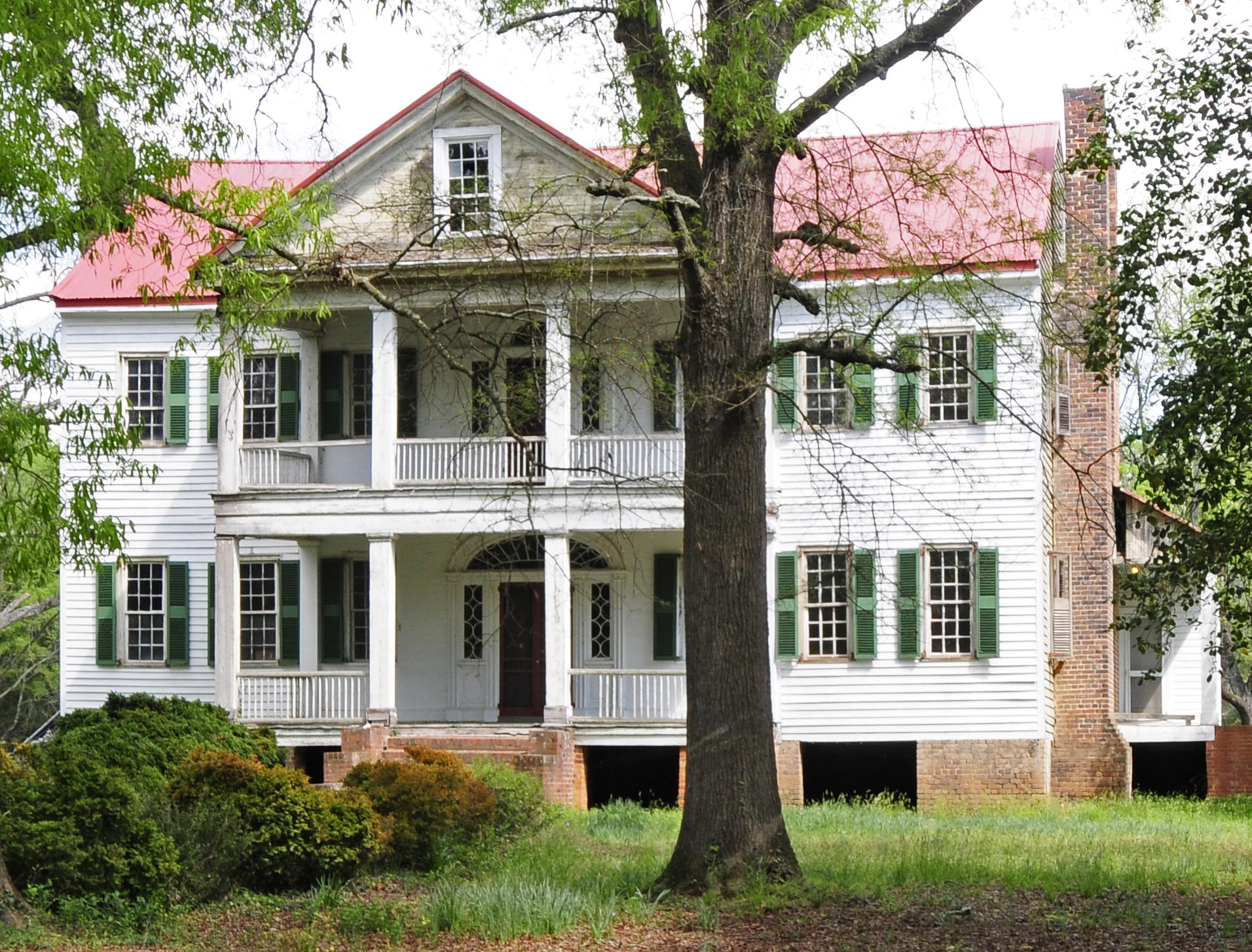
- J. Wesley Brooks House, March 2012

- Location within South Carolina Location within the United States
- Location: 2 miles south of Greenwood on U.S. Route 25, near Greenwood, South Carolina
- Coordinates: 34°8′18″N 82°7′48″W
- Area: 10 acres (4.0 ha)
- Built: 1815
- Architectural style: Palladian, Federal, Greek Revival
- NRHP reference No.: 73001712
- Added to NRHP: March 30, 1973

J. Wesley Brooks House (also known as the Scotch Cross House) is a historic house located two miles south of Greenwood, Greenwood County, South Carolina.

== Description and history ==
It was built in 1815, and is a two-story, white clapboard house on high brick supports in the Federal style with Palladian features. The house also has a portico in the Greek Revival style. The façade front features a double-tiered portico with pediment surmounting the second level portico.

It was listed on the National Register of Historic Places on March 30, 1973.
