= Old Greenwood High School =

- U.S. National Register of Historic Places
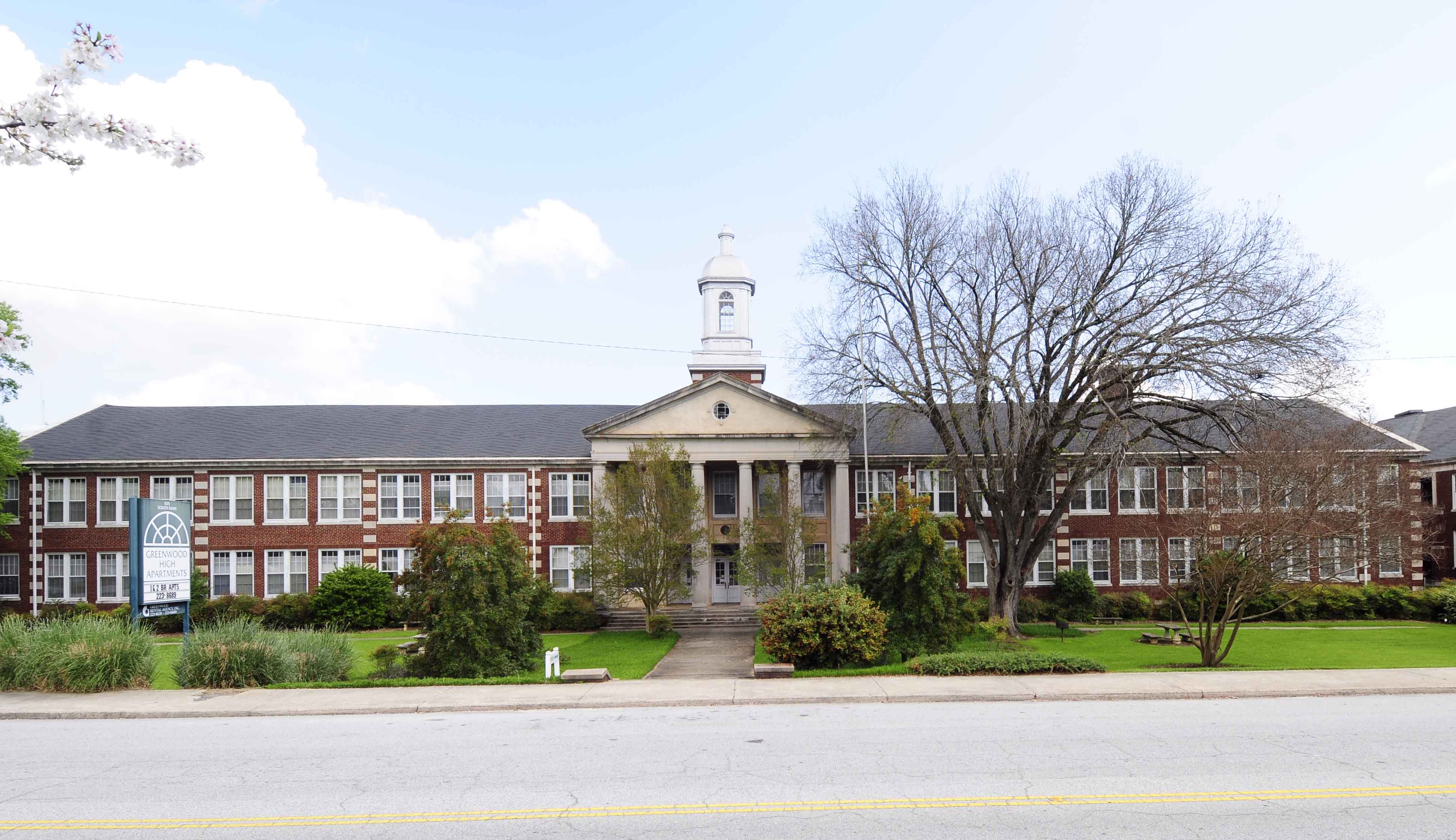
- Old Greenwood High School, March 2012

- Location within South Carolina Location within the United States
- Location: 857 S. Main St., Greenwood, South Carolina
- Coordinates: 34°11′08″N 82°09′28″W
- Area: 3 acres (1.2 ha)
- Built: 1925-1926, 1929-1930
- Architect: Hemphill, James C.; Wilson, Berryman & Kennedy
- Architectural style: Georgian Revival
- NRHP reference No.: 85003120
- Added to NRHP: October 10, 1985

Old Greenwood High School is a historic high school building located at Greenwood, Greenwood County, South Carolina. It was designed by the firm of Wilson, Berryman & Kennedy and built in 1925–1926. It is a complex of three brick buildings – the main building, the auditorium, and the gymnasium – each of which is in the Georgian Revival style and form a Palladian configuration. Each of the three buildings features a portico supported by six Tuscan order columns. The complex was completed with construction of the gymnasium building in 1929–1930.

It was listed on the National Register of Historic Places in 1985.
