= Magnolia Cemetery (Greenwood, South Carolina) =

Cemetery in Greenwood, South Carolina, US

- U.S. National Register of Historic Places
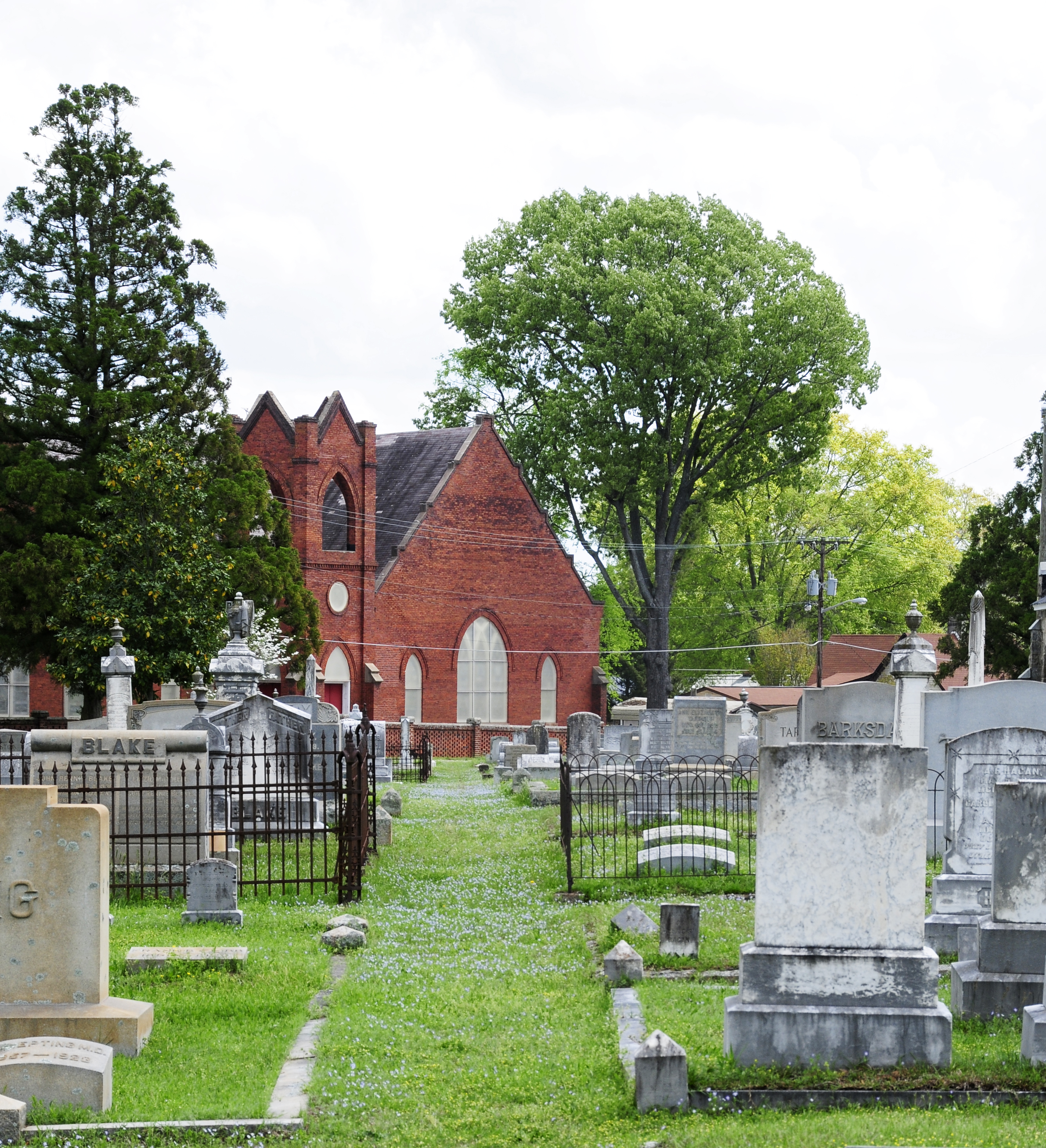
- Magnolia Cemetery

- Location within South Carolina Location within the United States
- Location: 416 Magnolia Ave., Greenwood, South Carolina
- Coordinates: 34°11′27″N 82°9′16″W
- Area: 4 acres (1.6 ha)
- NRHP reference No.: 04000590
- Added to NRHP: June 09, 2004

Magnolia Cemetery is a historic cemetery located at Greenwood, Greenwood County, South Carolina. It was established in 1871, and is laid out in a regular grid plan. It contains approximately 1,600 to 1,800 graves. Grave markers are primarily granite or marble tablets, obelisks, square, or stepped monuments capped with urns. There also are several Confederate grave markers, some of which still feature cast iron Maltese crosses. A Gothic-influenced granite shelter was added in 1922.

The cemetery was named to the National Register of Historic Places in 2004.

== Notable interments ==
- David Wyatt Aiken (1828–1887), Civil War Confederate Army officer, US Congressman
