= Barratt House =

Historic home near Greenwood, South Carolina, United States

- U.S. National Register of Historic Places
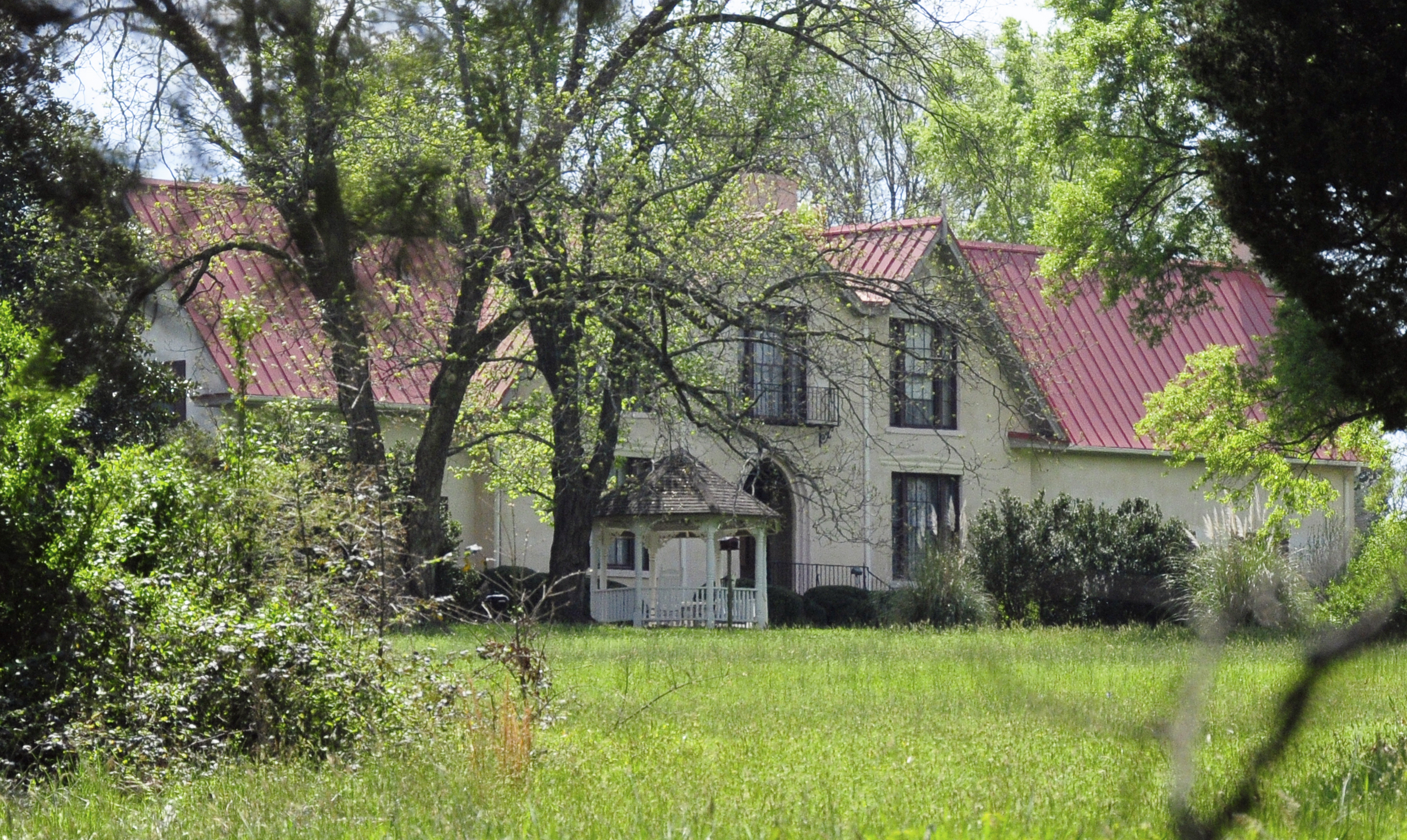
- Barratt House, March 2012

- Location within South Carolina Location within the United States
- Location: South Carolina Highway 67 and Bryan Dorn Rd., near Greenwood, South Carolina
- Coordinates: 34°06′37″N 82°7′39″W
- Area: 35 acres (14 ha)
- Built: c. 1853-1856
- Built by: Barratt, John P.
- Architectural style: Gothic Revival
- NRHP reference No.: 85002382
- Added to NRHP: September 12, 1985

Barratt House is a historic home located near Greenwood, Greenwood County, South Carolina. It was built about 1853–1856, and is a two-story, Gothic Revival style stuccoed brick house with a standing seam metal roof. Wings were constructed in 1957 and 1969. It features elaborate woodcarvings and painted murals, which were executed by Dr. John Perkins Barratt, an amateur sculptor and artist. Also on the property are a hewn log structure believed to have been constructed as a schoolhouse for Barratt's children in 1830, a gear house, corn crib, granary, and smokehouse.

It was listed on the National Register of Historic Places in 1985.
