= Brookland Plantation =

Historic house in South Carolina, United States

- Brooklands Plantation
- U.S. National Register of Historic Places
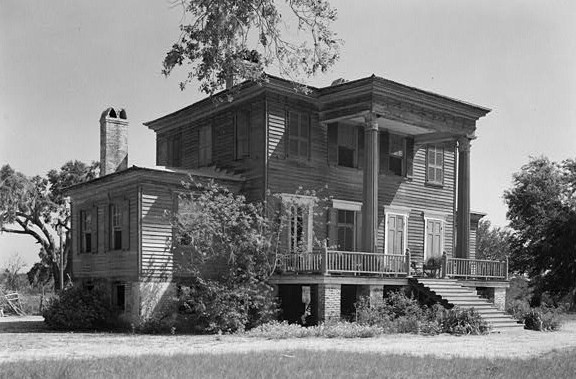

- Location within South Carolina Location within the United States
- Location: 2328 Laurel Hill Road
- Coordinates: 32°34′15″N 80°21′28″W
- Area: 59.62 acres (24.13 ha)
- Built: 1803
- Architect: Robert Mills
- Architectural style: Greek Revival
- NRHP reference No.: 86003198

Brookland Plantation (often written as Brooklands Plantation) is a large plantation along Shingle Creek on Edisto Island, South Carolina.

== History ==
Brookland Plantation existed on Edisto Island at least by the late 18th century, when it was the home of Joseph and Martha Jenkins, who are buried on the farm. The current plantation house, however, was built later. The core of the house was built of black cypress, and its side pavilions were added later. Long-gone cabins for the enslaved people who worked the land once stood between what are now grand old oak trees.

The house was perhaps built between 1800 and 1807, but some, such as architectural historian Samuel G. Stoney, claim that the house was likely built in the 1840s. The exact date of construction has not been determined, but Robert Mills is a suggested architect for the house. Ephriam Mikell Seabrook acquired the land, perhaps by intermarriage to the Seabrook family, by about 1800, and used it as cotton plantation before the Civil War. Ephriam's son, Henry Seabrook, inherited the plantation but lost it in a tax sale in 1872 when H.E. Young and James Lowndes bought the then-300 acres for $471. In 1928, Mary P. Bailey bought the house and added a metal roof over the wood shingles. In 1958, Rev. Ralph Wentling bought the plantation and turned it into Brooklands Home for Boys in 1958. The old school bell is mounted in the back garden. In 1968, Dr. and C.C. Wannamaker bought the house, while the Brooklands Home for Boys moved to Orangeburg County off the present U. S. 301 and Interstate 26, where it stayed until its acquisition by the South Carolina Baptist Convention, which merged it into the Connie Maxwell Children's Home in 1993.

Robert Chesnut bought the house from Dr. Wannamaker after a bidding war with another interested buyer, a partnership, for $1.75 million. Pat Barber and Cas Danielowski, who were the members of the partnership, coincidentally had been former clients of Mr. Chesnut and had planned on hiring him to restore the house for them had they bought it. Barber, Danielowski, and Chesnut formed a new partnership to restore the house. Former South Carolina Treasurer Thomas Ravenel purchased the 3,440-square foot house in 2006 because he heard there was an effort to subdivide the 60-acre property, and he wanted to save it. The property was listed for sale in June 2019, at a list price of $3,950,000 (~$4.77 million in 2024).
