= Stony Point (Greenwood, South Carolina) =

Historic house in South Carolina, United States

- U.S. National Register of Historic Places
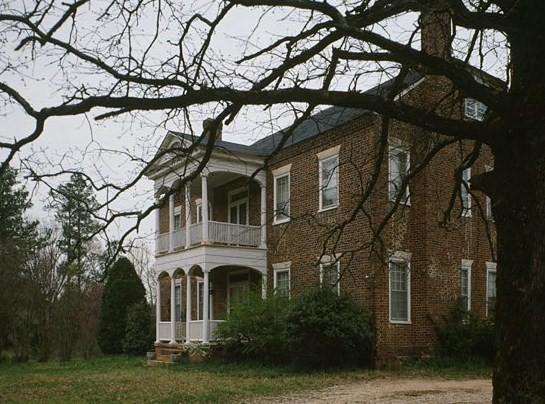
- Stony Point, HABS Photo, March 1987

- Location within South Carolina Location within the United States
- Location: North of Greenwood at the junction of South Carolina Highways 39 and 246, near Greenwood, South Carolina
- Coordinates: 34°16′44″N 82°7′33″W
- Area: 5 acres (2.0 ha)
- Built: 1818-1829
- NRHP reference No.: 75001700
- Added to NRHP: June 20, 1975

Stony Point is a historic home located near Greenwood, Greenwood County, South Carolina. It was built between 1818 and 1829, and is a two-story, five-bay, brick dwelling. It has a jerkinhead roof and twin exterior end chimneys. It was the home of Joel Smith, who was an influential planter, merchant, banker, and supporter of industries and railroads.

It was listed on the National Register of Historic Places in 1975.
