= Sunnyside (Greenwood, South Carolina) =

Historic house in South Carolina, United States

- U.S. National Register of Historic Places
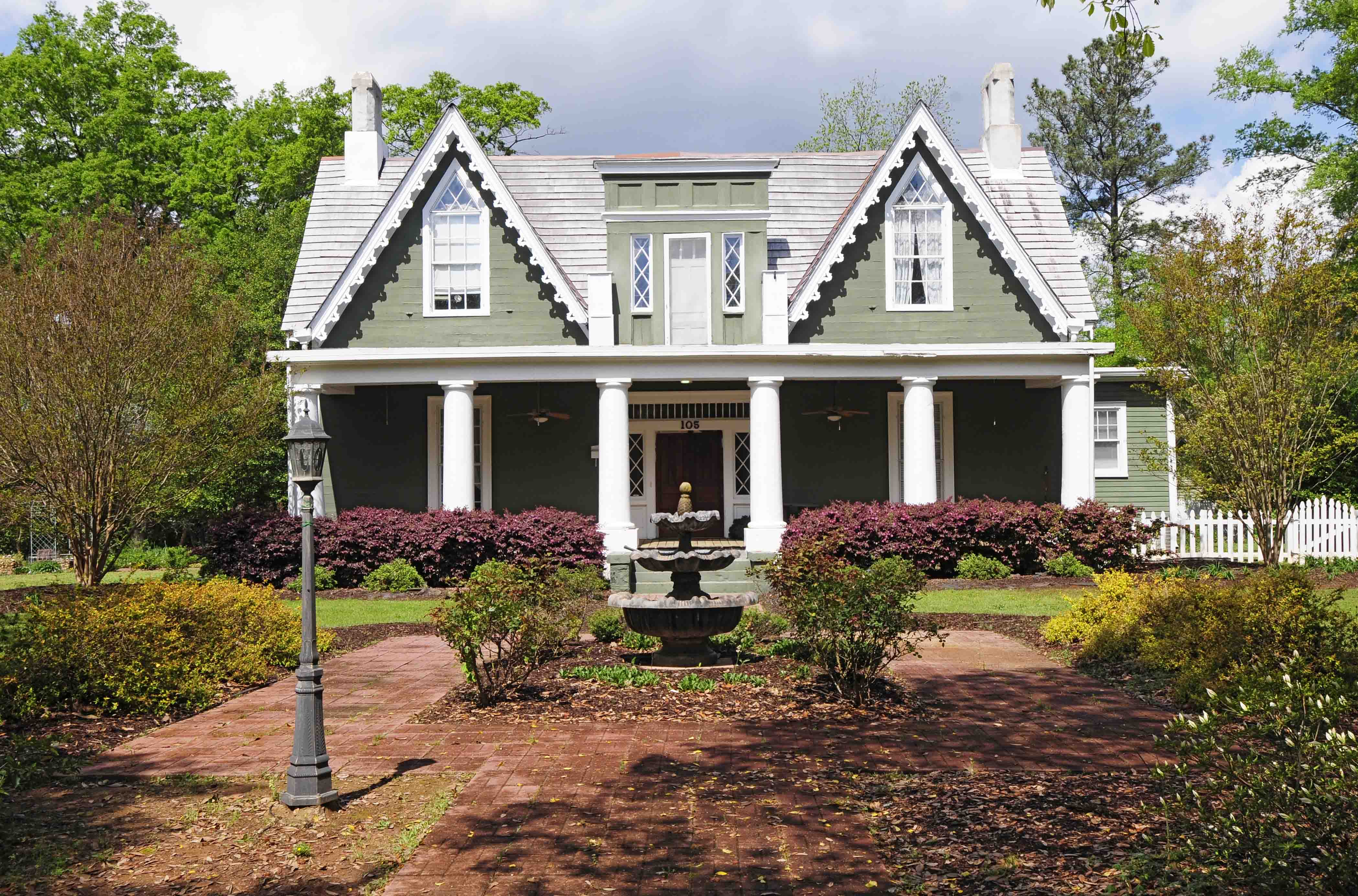
- Sunnyside, March 2012

- Location within South Carolina Location within the United States
- Location: 105 Dargan Ave., Greenwood, South Carolina
- Coordinates: 34°11′7″N 82°9′8″W
- Area: 3.3 acres (1.3 ha)
- Built: 1851
- Architectural style: Greek Revival, Gothic Revival, Transitional
- NRHP reference No.: 78002515
- Added to NRHP: November 14, 1978

Sunnyside is a historic home located at Greenwood, Greenwood County, South Carolina. It was built in 1851, and is a 1 1/2-half story house modeled after Sunnyside, the home of Washington Irving. It has flush board siding covering the front façade, and weatherboard siding covering the remainder of the house. It is basically Gothic Revival in style, featuring a gabled roof and dormers with scalloped bargeboard. It features a Greek Revival style portico.

It was listed on the National Register of Historic Places in 1978.
