= Phoenix election riot =

1898 riot in the United States

Coordinates: 34.16°N 82.13°W

- Date: November 8, 1898
- Location: Greenwood County, South Carolina, U.S.
- Caused by: Disputes over voting rights for African Americans
- Methods: Riot
- Result: Death of several African American men; suppression of Black voters

Parties
African American voters	White Democratic Party members

Casualties
- Deaths: 7+
- Injuries: Several
- Location within South Carolina

The Phoenix election riot occurred on November 8, 1898, near Greenwood County, South Carolina, when a group of local white Democrats attempted to stop a Republican election official from taking the affidavits of African Americans who had been denied the ability to vote. The race-based riot was part of numerous efforts by white conservative Democrats to suppress voting by blacks, as they had largely supported the Republican Party since the Reconstruction era. Beginning with Mississippi in 1890, and South Carolina in 1895, southern states were passing new constitutions and laws designed to disenfranchise blacks by making voter registration and voting more difficult.

The riot started after white land-owner Thomas Tolbert began to take affidavits of African Americans who had been disenfranchised by the new Constitution of South Carolina. Tolbert, brother of Republican candidate Robert R. Tolbert, hoped to use the affidavits to challenge the constitutional provisions that had formalized a previously informal disfranchisement. On November 8, 1898, Thomas Tolbert stood at the entrance of the Watson and Lake general store and began to collect the affidavits. A group of local Democrats led by J. I. "Bose" Ethridge arrived and assaulted and terrorized him.

Over the following four days, several African Americans and one white man were fatally shot. The white mob lynched several blacks, wounded hundreds and burned Thomas Tolbert's home and personal belongings.

Newspaper article from the insurrection, titled "Race Riot in Greenwood"

== Background ==
Race riots in the United States during this time was not uncommon, as many ethnic, political and social barriers were established between ethnic groups. A few examples of the riots that occurred during this period includes:

- 1831: Nat Turner's Rebellion (Southampton County, Virginia)
- 1835: Five Points Riot (New York City)
- 1863: Detroit race riot
- 1863: New York City draft riots
- 1870-71: Orange Riots
- 1898: Wilmington massacre

The riots of the late 1800s, although provoked by a different cause, were related to the South's widespread efforts to disenfranchise blacks in the period following the Reconstruction period.

In 1877, the Federal Government withdrew its troops from the South, giving up its efforts to enforce the rights of freedmen and ensure their enfranchisement. Conservative white Democrats completed their takeover of state governments, although blacks continued to elect some persons to office through the century. This change in policy resulted in African-American disfranchisement, social, educational and employment discrimination, and peonage. Deprived of civil and human rights, African Americans were reduced to a status of quasi-slavery or "second-class" citizenship. A tense atmosphere of racial hatred, ignorance, and fear bred lawless mass violence, murder, and lynching. To ensure and enforce blacks' second-class status, white Democrats enacted segregation and Jim Crow laws throughout the South. During the period of the late 19th and early 20th centuries, lynchings reached a peak in the South. Florida led the nation in lynchings per capita from 1900 to 1930.

During the late 19th and early 20th centuries, lynching was the practice of murder through extrajudicial actions. Most commonly, the victims of lynching were African-American men: between the time periods of 1882–1968, black Americans made up 72.7% of all people lynched.

=== Thomas Tolbert ===
Although the causes of the riot are still studied, the initial outbreak was a result of the heightened political and racial tensions. The parties were largely race-based, and conservative white Democrats were determined to ensure that black Republicans were excluded from voting and from offices. They had used fraud and violence for years to suppress black Republican voting.

Thomas Tolbert, a white man, believed that African Americans deserved the right to vote, and disagreed with their disenfranchisement by the South Carolina State Constitution.

== Events ==
November 8, 1898, at around 9:00 in the morning, Thomas Tolbert joined African Americans (and Republicans) Joe Circuit, Will White and others outside of the polling place at Watson and Lake general store. They encouraged African Americans to submit affidavits if they encountered difficulty voting. Tolbert had hoped to use the affidavits to expose the ongoing electoral fraud that had deprived African Americans of the vote for the past twenty-two years. Tolbert and his followers were quickly approached by a group of local Democrats, including J. I. Ethridge, the local Democratic Party boss. Ethridge and Robert Cheatham asked Tolbert to stop what he was doing. When he refused, they overturned the box that he had been using to collect the affidavits with and began to beat him with the splintered wood and other various materials. Tolbert hit Ethridge over the head with a wagon axle.

During the altercation, William White, one of Tolbert's followers, was pushed to the ground. He may have picked up a shotgun and fired the first shot, fatally shooting J.I Ethridge, who died immediately. Ethridge's followers immediately attacked Tolbert and his supporters. Other white voters joined the altercation and used guns against Tolbert and his group.

During the riot, Tolbert sustained gunshot wounds to the neck, arms, and his left side. He retreated.

== Aftermath ==
Immediately after the riot, whites accused many black men of being involved in the violence. An uneasy peace spread over Greenwood county, as residents grappled with what had happened, and feared more violence.

When the news got out, conservative whites started going to Greenwood to avenge Ethridge's death. Groups of armed whites scourged the countryside and nearby areas in search of victims. The group drove the Tolbert family from their home, which they destroyed and burned, along with all of the family's personal possessions. The white mob lynched four black men near the local Rehoboth Church.

On November 11, Robert Tolbert, Thomas's brother, met with President McKinley at the White House to seek redress. The next day's issue of the New York Times reported that "the president listened attentively to the recital, but gave no indication of what action, if any, might be taken."

=== Wilmington massacre ===
Following the Phoenix Election Riot, a white insurgent group overthrew the elected biracial fusionist government, including a white mayor, of the city of Wilmington, North Carolina. They precipitated the 1898 Wilmington massacre. The Democrats in the state had also been working to oust the state's Republican and populist biracial fusion government from power. The insurrection resulted in roughly 25 African Americans murdered and countless more injured by a white mob that roamed the city, attacking blacks.

Democratic party white supremacists overthrew the newly elected fusionist white mayor and biracial council. The mob of around 2,000 whites took to the streets and attacked the mainly black newspaper, Daily Record. The core group of insurgents already had assigned officeholders to the city's elected positions. Many African Americans left Wilmington permanently, although it had long been a majority-black city.

== See also ==
- List of incidents of civil unrest in the United States
