= Leath Correctional Institution =

Women's prison in South Carolina, United States

Coordinates: 34°15′11″N 82°08′44″W

- Interactive map of Leath Correctional Institution
- Location: 2809 Airport Road Greenwood, South Carolina
- Status: open
- Security class: medium (female facility)
- Capacity: 968
- Opened: 1991
- Managed by: South Carolina Department of Corrections

Leath Correctional Institution (LCIW) is a South Carolina Department of Corrections prison for women located in unincorporated Greenwood County, South Carolina, United States, near Greenwood. Leath opened in 1991. It is located just east of the Greenwood County Airport.

The prison, on a 39-acre (16 ha) plot of land, has a capacity of 968.

== History ==
The prison opened in September 1991.

In the early 1990s a company called Third Generation contracted the manufacture of women's underwear to 35 Leath prisoners. These prisoners produced about $1.5 million worth of clothing. J.C. Penney, Victoria's Secret, and other companies bought this underwear for resale. This was revealed in a 1995 National Institute for Justice study. The contract was terminated by the mid-1990s.

The prison's Braille Production Center, in which inmates make braille materials for schoolchildren, opened in 2002.

The current chapel was dedicated on February 21, 2013.

== Demographics ==
As of 2016 the prison has 105 corrections officers and 40 non-security personnel, as well as 562 prisoners.

== Notable inmates ==
- Susan Smith

== See also ==
- List of South Carolina state prisons
