= Mt. Pisgah A.M.E. Church =

Historic church in South Carolina, United States

- U.S. National Register of Historic Places
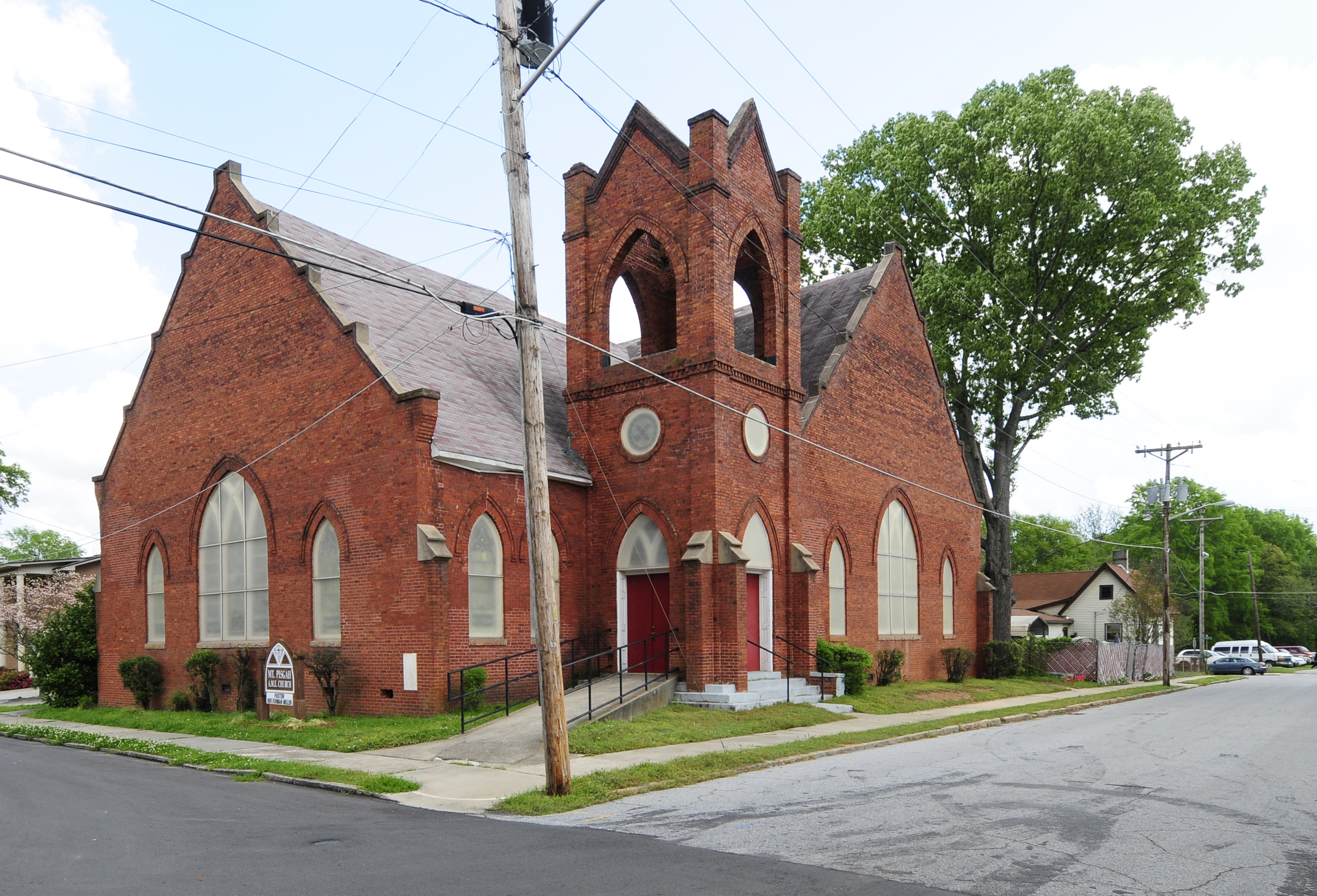

- Location within South Carolina Location within the United States
- Location: Hackett Ave. and James St., Greenwood, South Carolina
- Coordinates: 34°11′29″N 82°9′12″W
- Area: 0.2 acres (0.081 ha)
- Built: 1908
- Architect: Members of the congregation
- Architectural style: Late Victorian, Vernacular ecclesiastical
- NRHP reference No.: 79002384
- Added to NRHP: August 16, 1979

Mt. Pisgah A. M.E. Church is a historic African Methodist Episcopal church located at Hackett Avenue and James Street in Greenwood, Greenwood County, South Carolina. It was built in 1908, and is a brick Gothic Revival-style church. It features a steep, cross-gabled roof with stepped end gables, asymmetrical massing, and pointed stained glass windows.

It was listed on the National Register of Historic Places in 1979.

Congregants have included US Congressman Jim Clyburn and state representative James Felder.
