= Tabernacle Cemetery =

United States historic place in Greenwood County, South Carolina

- U.S. National Register of Historic Places
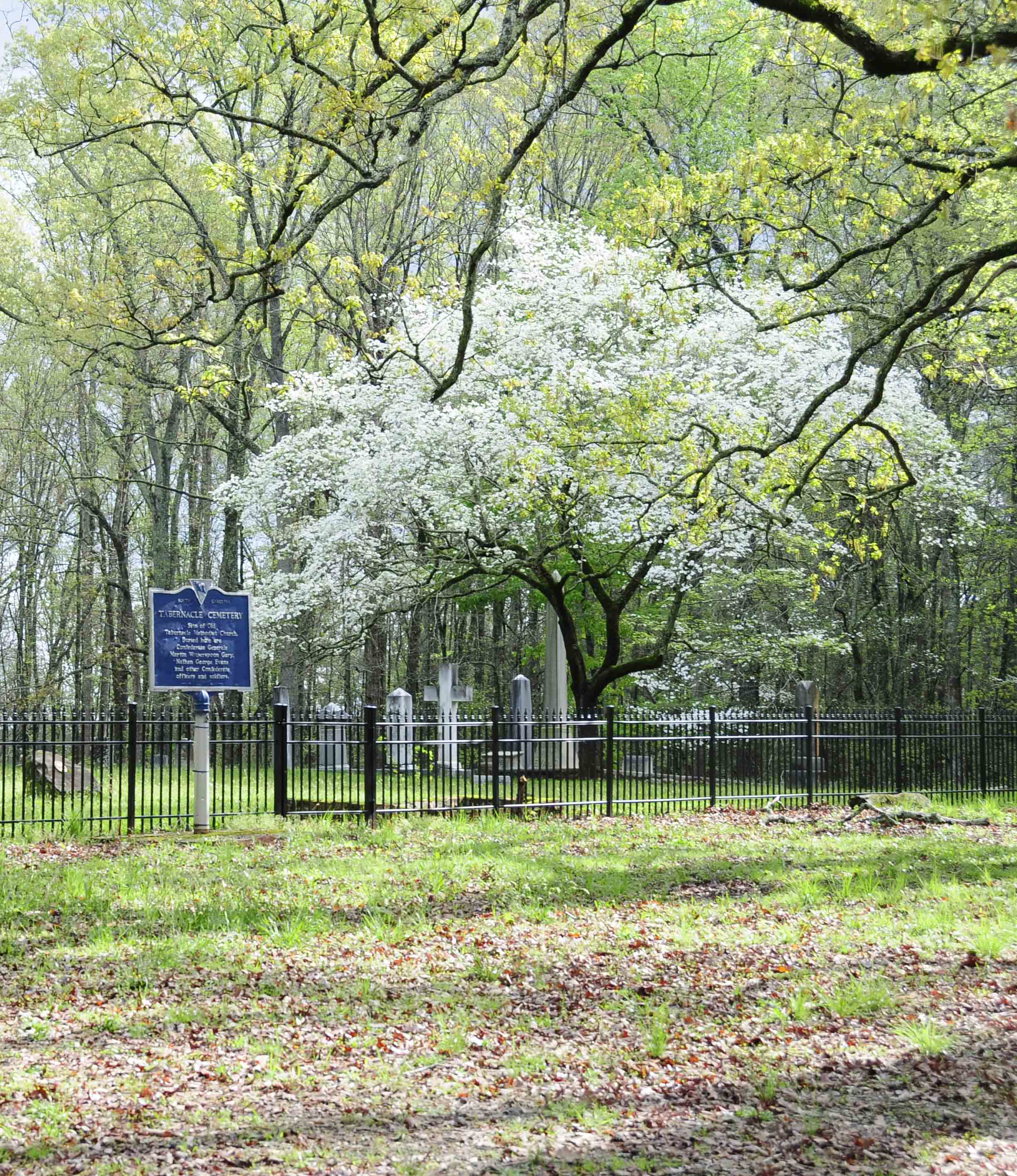
- Tabernacle Cemetery, March 2012

- Location within South Carolina Location within the United States
- Location: Tabernacle Cemetery Rd., just east of South Carolina Highway 254, near Greenwood, South Carolina
- Coordinates: 34°16′00″N 82°11′02″W
- Area: 3.5 acres (1.4 ha)
- Built: 1812
- NRHP reference No.: 08000736
- Added to NRHP: August 1, 2008

Tabernacle Cemetery is a historic cemetery located near Greenwood, Greenwood County, South Carolina. It was established in 1812, and includes the graves of many prominent citizens of Abbeville and Edgefield Districts and later Greenwood County as well, from the early-19th through the 20th centuries. It is the only cemetery in South Carolina where two Confederate Generals, namely brothers-in-law Nathan George Evans and Martin Witherspoon Gary, are buried. Most graves date from about 1812 to about 1950. The cemetery contains approximately 132 marked graves.

The cemetery was named to the National Register of Historic Places in 2008.
