= Trapp and Chandler Pottery Site (38GN169) =

Archaeological site in South Carolina, United States

- U.S. National Register of Historic Places
- Nearest city: Kirksey, South Carolina
- Area: 0.6 acres (0.24 ha)
- Built: 1852
- NRHP reference No.: 86000043
- Added to NRHP: January 6, 1986

Trapp and Chandler Pottery Site (38GN169) is an historic archaeological site located near Kirksey, Greenwood County, South Carolina. It is the last known intact site of a production center of Edgefield decorated stoneware. The Trapp and Chandler Stoneware pottery was an antebellum pottery factory and began production of Alkaline glazed utilitarian stoneware around 1834. It continued production until the later part of the 19th century.

It was listed on the National Register of Historic Places in 1986.
