= Lander College Old Main Building =

- U.S. National Register of Historic Places
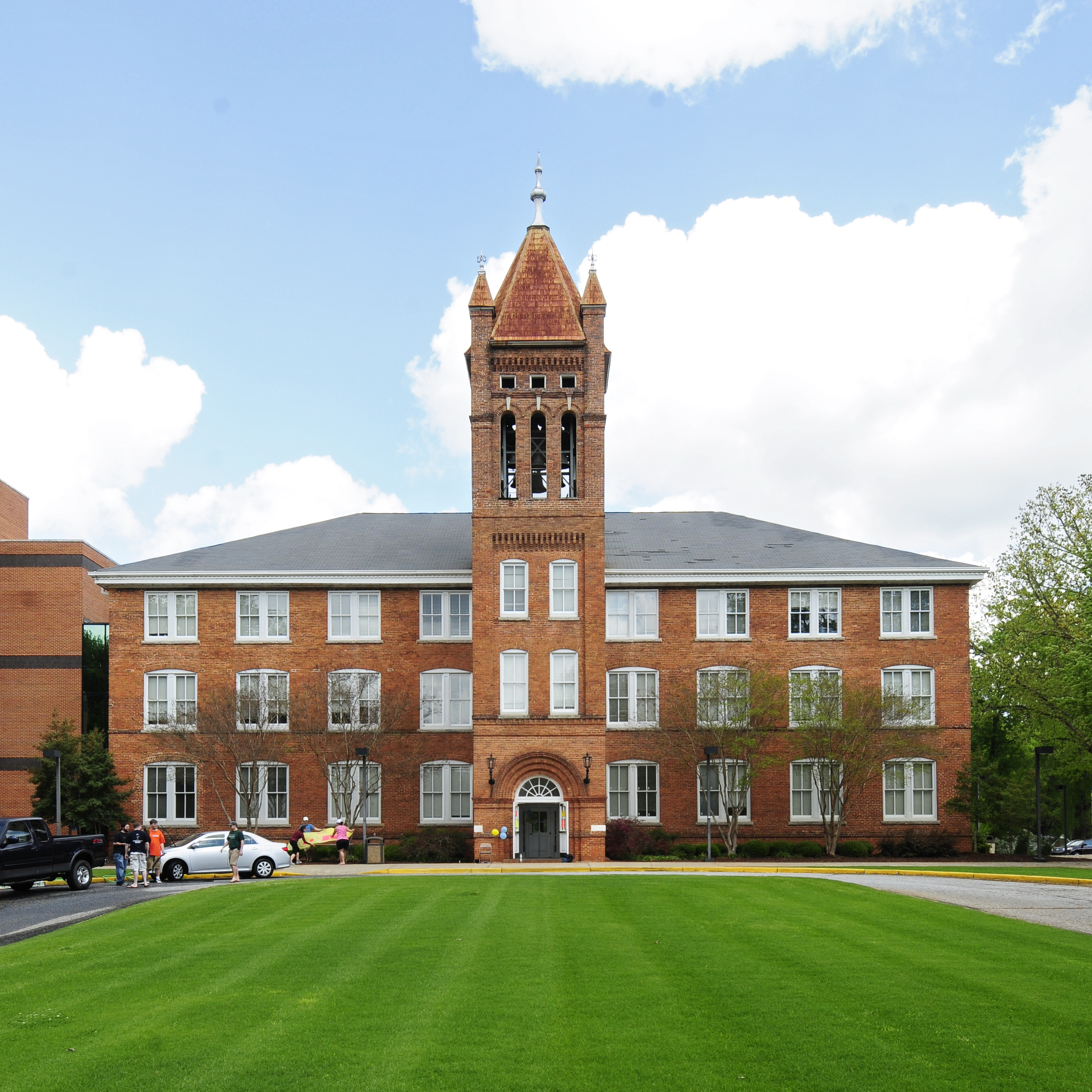
- Lander College Old Main Building, March 2012

- Location within South Carolina Location within the United States
- Location: Stanley Ave. and Lander St., Greenwood, South Carolina
- Coordinates: 34°11′54″N 82°9′52″W
- Area: 3.5 acres (1.4 ha)
- Built: 1903-1904, 1911
- Architect: Hunt, Reuben Harrison; Cothran, Thomas W.
- Architectural style: Colonial Revival, Romanesque, Georgian Revival
- NRHP reference No.: 84002046
- Added to NRHP: August 2, 1984

Lander College Old Main Building is a historic academic building located on the campus of Lander University at Greenwood, Greenwood County, South Carolina. It is a large masonry building, composed of three distinct sections with a blending of elements of the Romanesque Revival and Georgian Revival styles. Two of the sections, Greenwood Hall and Laura Lander Hall, were built in 1903-04; Willson Hall was added in 1911. It is the earliest Lander College building. The tower serves as a focal point for the building and defines its character as a school building.

It was listed on the National Register of Historic Places in 1984.
