= Old Greenwood Cemetery =

Historic cemetery in Greenwood County, South Carolina

- U.S. National Register of Historic Places
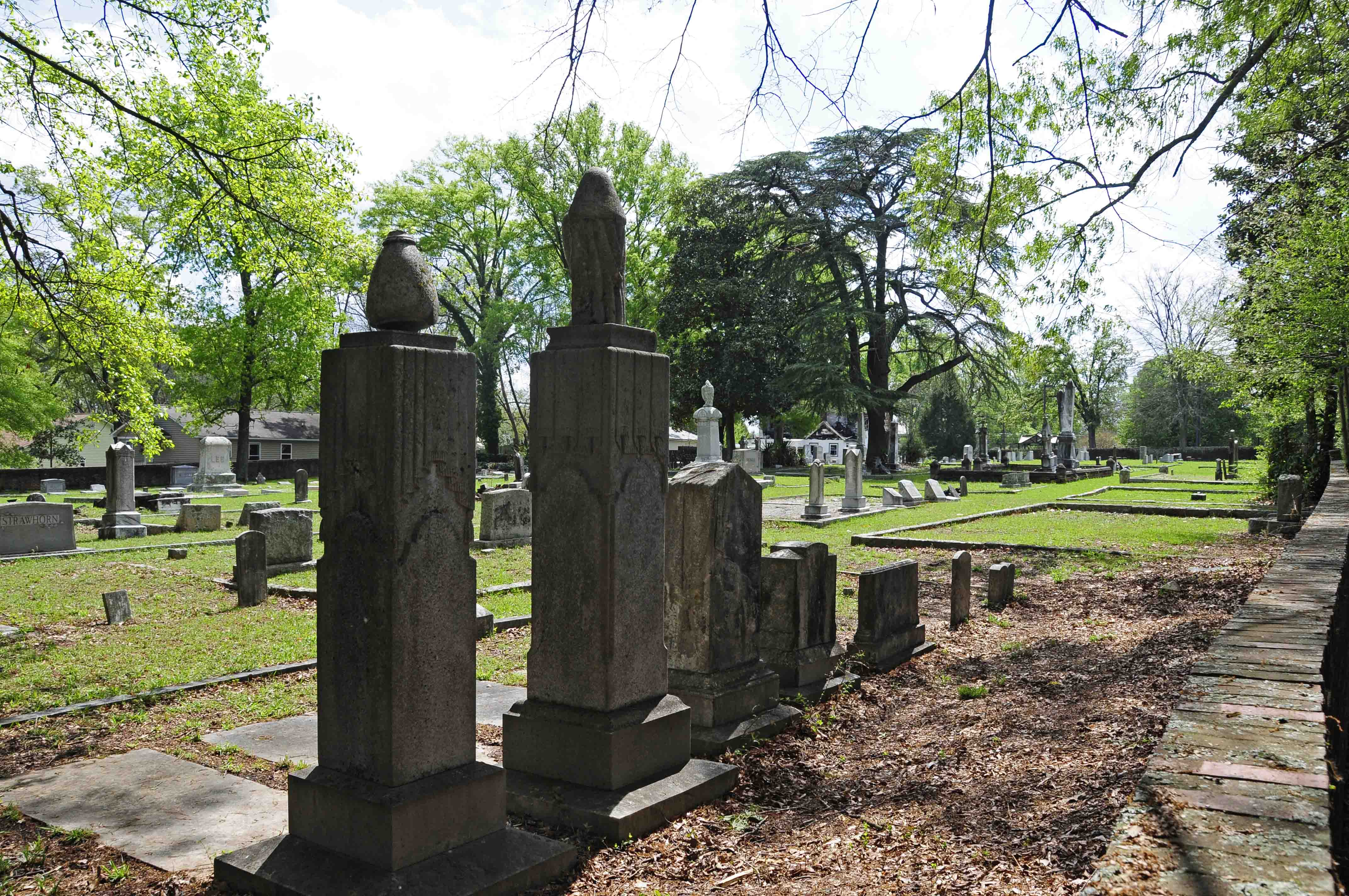

- Location within South Carolina Location within the United States
- Location: 503 E. Cambridge Ave., Greenwood, South Carolina
- Coordinates: 34°11′50″N 82°9′12″W
- Area: 1.5 acres (0.61 ha)
- NRHP reference No.: 02000115
- Added to NRHP: March 1, 2002

Old Greenwood Cemetery is a historic cemetery located at Greenwood, Greenwood County, South Carolina, United States. Established around the year 1860, the Old Greenwood Cemetery is a historic burial place in the said city. It is significant because of being the oldest cemetery in the area. This being said, it has also become the resting place for many prominent figures in the locale.

The Old Greenwood Cemetery was built as a graveyard for the old Main Street Methodist Church. It was laid out in the original site of the said church with an acre and a half of land area. It contains about 350 graves of pioneers and locals.

The descendants of the people buried on the Old Greenwood Cemetery mostly take responsibility in caring for the site. They work hard to keep vandals away and maintain the site the best that they can.

The cemetery was named to the National Register of Historic Places in 2002.
