= Masonic Female College and Cokesbury Conference School =

- Old Cokesbury and Masonic Female College and Conference School
- U.S. National Register of Historic Places
- U.S. Historic district
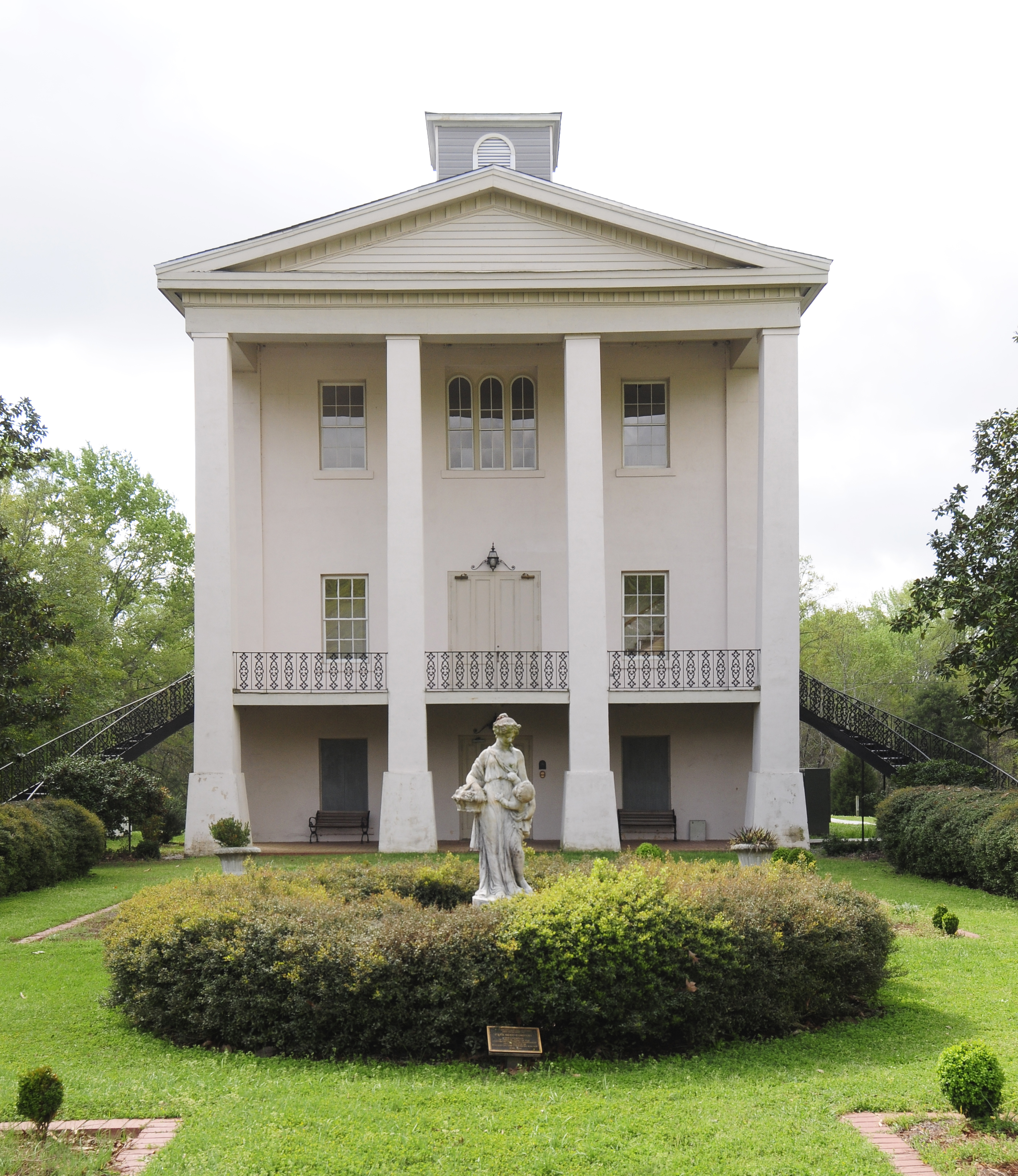

- Location within South Carolina Location within the United States
- Nearest city: Cokesbury, South Carolina, U.S.
- Coordinates: 34°17′11″N 82°13′00″W
- Area: 14,438 acres (5,843 ha)
- Built: 1824
- Architect: Multiple
- Architectural style: Greek Revival
- NRHP reference No.: 70000589
- Added to NRHP: August 25, 1970

The Masonic Female College and Cokesbury Conference School is a historic building in Cokesbury, South Carolina, that was the home of several different educational institutions in the century from 1854 to 1954. Together with the adjacent village of Old Cokesbury, it is now listed on the National Register of Historic Places as an historic district.

When built in 1854, the school building was the home of the Masonic Female College of South Carolina, which was established in 1853 and operated until 1874 under the sponsorship of Bascomb Lodge No. 80 of Freemasons. The school was unusual for its time in providing an education for young women.

From 1876 to 1918, the building was the site of the Cokesbury Conference School, a school for boys from 1876 to 1882, and co-educational thereafter. In 1918, it became a public school, and operated as such until 1954. In 1954 the property reverted to the South Carolina Annual Conference of the United Methodist Church. The three-story Greek Revival style building has a bell tower and four square columns that extend from the ground level to the pediment. The first floor contained four student recitation rooms and four music rooms, there was a chapel on the second floor, and the third floor housed a Masonic Lodge headquarters. The school building and Old Cokesbury were listed together on the National Register on August 25, 1970.
