= Cokesbury, South Carolina =

- Census-designated place
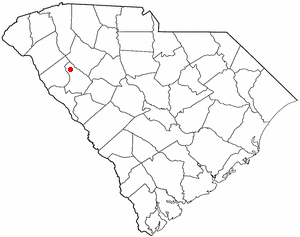
- Location of Cokesbury, South Carolina
- Coordinates: 34°17′24″N 82°12′31″W
- Country: United States
- State: South Carolina
- County: Greenwood

Area
  - Total: 0.59 sq mi (1.54 km^{2})
  - Land: 0.59 sq mi (1.54 km^{2})
  - Water: 0 sq mi (0.00 km^{2})
- Elevation: 637 ft (194 m)

Population (2020)
  - Total: 212
  - Density: 357.2/sq mi (137.92/km^{2})
- Time zone: UTC-5 (Eastern (EST))
  - Summer (DST): UTC-4 (EDT)
- ZIP code: 29653
- Area codes: 864, 821
- FIPS code: 45-15625
- GNIS feature ID: 2402785

Cokesbury is a census-designated place (CDP) in Greenwood County, South Carolina, United States. The population was 215 at the 2010 census, down from 279 in 2000.

== History ==
The name "Cokesbury" is a combination of the names of two prominent bishops of the Methodist Episcopal Church, Thomas Coke and Francis Asbury.

The historic village of Cokesbury and the building that housed the Masonic Female College and Cokesbury Conference School are listed together on the National Register of Historic Places as an historic district.

== Geography ==
Cokesbury is located in northern Greenwood County. It is 7 miles (11 km) north of Greenwood, the county seat.

According to the United States Census Bureau, the Cokesbury CDP has a total area of 0.58 square miles (1.5 km^{2}), all land.

== Demographics ==
Historical population
Census	Pop.	Note	%±
1850	878		—
2000	279		—
2010	215		−22.9%
2020	212		−1.4%
U.S. Decennial Census

=== 2020 census ===
Cokesbury CDP, South Carolina – Racial and ethnic composition Note: the US Census treats Hispanic/Latino as an ethnic category. This table excludes Latinos from the racial categories and assigns them to a separate category. Hispanics/Latinos may be of any race.
Race / Ethnicity (NH = Non-Hispanic)	Pop 2000	Pop 2010	Pop 2020	% 2000	% 2010	% 2020
White alone (NH)	70	52	82	25.09%	24.19%	38.68%
Black or African American alone (NH)	203	161	116	72.76%	74.88%	54.72%
Native American or Alaska Native alone (NH)	3	0	0	1.08%	0.00%	0.00%
Asian alone (NH)	0	0	2	0.00%	0.00%	0.94%
Native Hawaiian or Pacific Islander alone (NH)	0	0	0	0.00%	0.00%	0.00%
Other race alone (NH)	0	0	0	0.00%	0.00%	0.00%
Mixed race or Multiracial (NH)	3	2	5	1.08%	0.93%	2.36%
Hispanic or Latino (any race)	0	0	7	0.00%	0.00%	3.30%
Total	279	215	212	100.00%	100.00%	100.00%

As of the census of 2000, there were 279 people, 105 households, and 78 families residing in the CDP. The population density was 444.1 inhabitants per square mile (171.5/km^{2}). There were 111 housing units at an average density of 176.7 per square mile (68.2/km^{2}). The racial makeup of the CDP was 25.09% White, 72.76% African American, 1.08% Native American, and 1.08% from two or more races.

There were 105 households, out of which 33.3% had children under the age of 18 living with them, 52.4% were married couples living together, 17.1% had a female householder with no husband present, and 25.7% were non-families. 25.7% of all households were made up of individuals, and 7.6% had someone living alone who was 65 years of age or older. The average household size was 2.66 and the average family size was 3.14.

In the CDP, the population was spread out, with 26.2% under the age of 18, 6.5% from 18 to 24, 27.2% from 25 to 44, 29.0% from 45 to 64, and 11.1% who were 65 years of age or older. The median age was 40 years. For every 100 females, there were 80.0 males. For every 100 females age 18 and over, there were 89.0 males.

The median income for a household in the CDP was $31,908, and the median income for a family was $31,447. Males had a median income of $16,927 versus $30,625 for females. The per capita income for the CDP was $13,592. About 7.4% of families and 13.5% of the population were below the poverty line, including none of those under the age of eighteen and 51.7% of those 65 or over.

== Education ==
It is in the Greenwood School District 50. The zoned schools are: Hodges Elementary School, Northside Middle School, and Greenwood High School.

== Notable person ==
- John Gary Evans - 85th Governor of South Carolina
