= James C. Self House =

Historic house in South Carolina, United States

- U.S. National Register of Historic Places
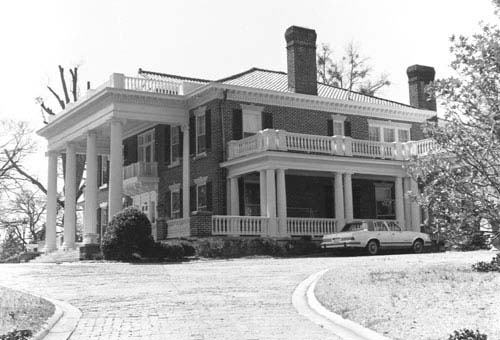
- James C. Self house in 1987

- Location within South Carolina Location within the United States
- Location: 595 N. Mathis St., Greenwood, South Carolina
- Coordinates: 34°11′38″N 82°10′54″W
- Area: 7.9 acres (3.2 ha)
- Built: 1918
- Architect: Thomas W. Cothran
- Architectural style: Neo-Classical
- NRHP reference No.: 87002064
- Added to NRHP: November 20, 1987

James C. Self House is a historic home in Greenwood, South Carolina, designed by local architect Thomas White Cothran (1874-1923) for textile magnate and philanthropist James Cuthbert Self (1876-1955) and built in 1917–1918. The house is a two-story, brick veneer Neoclassical style dwelling with a green Spanish tile hipped roof. It sits on a brick foundation faced with rock and an Ionic order portico that projects from the three central bays. The property includes a smokehouse/wellhouse and garage.

It was listed on the National Register of Historic Places in 1987.
