= Greenwood, South Carolina =

Greenwood
- City
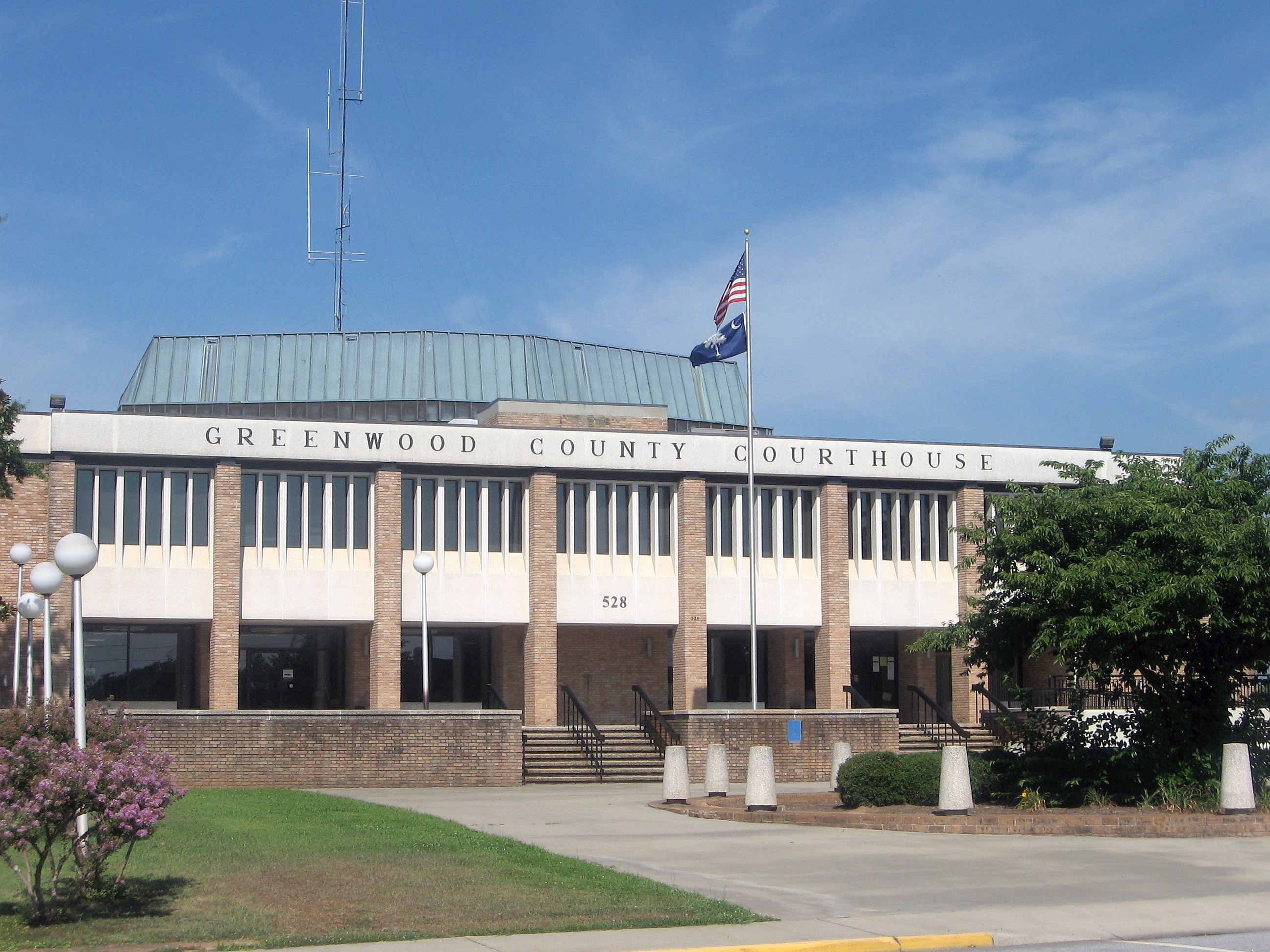
- Greenwood County Courthouse in Greenwood

- Seal
- Nickname: The Emerald City
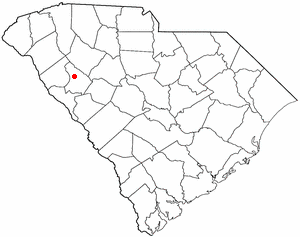
- Location of Greenwood, South Carolina
- Coordinates: 34°11′43″N 82°09′42″W
- Country: United States
- State: South Carolina
- County: Greenwood

Area
  - Total: 16.74 sq mi (43.36 km^{2})
  - Land: 16.62 sq mi (43.05 km^{2})
  - Water: 0.12 sq mi (0.31 km^{2})
- Elevation: 663 ft (202 m)

Population (2020)
  - Total: 22,545
  - Density: 1,356.4/sq mi (523.69/km^{2})
- Time zone: UTC−5 (Eastern (EST))
  - Summer (DST): UTC−4 (EDT)
- ZIP codes: 29646-29649
- Area codes: 864, 821
- FIPS code: 45-30895
- GNIS feature ID: 2403756
- Website: www.cityofgreenwoodsc.com

Greenwood is a city in and the county seat of Greenwood County, South Carolina. The population in the 2020 United States census was 22,545, down from 23,222 at the 2010 census. The city is home to Lander University.

== History ==
In 1823 John McGehee and his wife Charlotte built a summerhouse called "Green Wood" midway between the cities of Abbeville and Cambridge in order to have cleaner air. Nearby, a village named Woodville was formed in 1837 with a post office. By 1850, the village designation was changed to the name Greenwood. The town grew with the first railroad, the Greenville & Columbia Railroad built in 1852. Greenwood was incorporated in 1857.

Starting in 1872, the American Missionary Association (AMA) founded the Brewer Normal Institute in Greenwood; a segregated school for African-American students. The Brewer Normal Institute was initially a private boarding school, and by 1925 it became a public school which closed in 1970. The AMA also built the Brewer Hospital in Greenwood in order to help fostering community racial integration. It was dedicated on May 24, 1924.

Greenwood primarily served as a railroad and agricultural town until 1890 when William L. Durst opened the Greenwood Cotton Mill, and after which moved into local textile manufacturing. In 1904 Lander University moved from Williamston to Greenwood, and in 1966 the Piedmont Technical College opened.

== Geography and Climate ==
Greenwood is located slightly northwest of the center of Greenwood County. According to the United States Census Bureau, the city has a total area of 16.3 square miles (42.3 km^{2}), of which 16.2 square miles (42.0 km^{2}) are land and 0.1 square miles (0.3 km^{2}), or 0.72%, are water.

U.S. Routes 25, 178 and 221 pass through the eastern side of the city, bypassing the downtown area. US 25 leads north 51 miles (82 km) to Greenville and south 63 miles (101 km) to Augusta, Georgia, US 178 leads northwest 42 miles (68 km) to Anderson and southeast 29 miles (47 km) to Saluda, and US 221 leads northeast 26 miles (42 km) to Laurens and southwest 23 miles (37 km) to McCormick.

Lake Greenwood, a reservoir on the Saluda River, is 8 miles (13 km) northeast of the city at its nearest point. The lake has 212 miles (341 km) of shoreline, covers 11,000 acres (4,500 ha), and is almost 20 miles (32 km) long. Lake Greenwood State Park, built in the 1930s by the Civilian Conservation Corps, is 14 miles (23 km) east of the city on the south shore of Lake Greenwood and includes two boat ramps, a campground, trail and playgrounds, and many picnic areas. The area around Greenwood is locally billed as the "Lakelands", due to several lakes for recreational fishing and diverse terrain for hiking trails.

Climate data for Greenwood County Airport, South Carolina (1991-2020 normals)
Month	Jan	Feb	Mar	Apr	May	Jun	Jul	Aug	Sep	Oct	Nov	Dec	Year
Mean daily maximum °F (°C)	53.4 (11.9)	57.3 (14.1)	65.0 (18.3)	73.4 (23.0)	80.5 (26.9)	86.8 (30.4)	90.2 (32.3)	88.7 (31.5)	83.2 (28.4)	73.5 (23.1)	63.2 (17.3)	55.5 (13.1)	72.6 (22.6)
Daily mean °F (°C)	42.6 (5.9)	46.0 (7.8)	52.9 (11.6)	60.8 (16.0)	68.7 (20.4)	75.9 (24.4)	79.4 (26.3)	78.1 (25.6)	72.4 (22.4)	61.3 (16.3)	51.0 (10.6)	44.6 (7.0)	61.2 (16.2)
Mean daily minimum °F (°C)	31.8 (−0.1)	34.8 (1.6)	40.8 (4.9)	48.3 (9.1)	56.9 (13.8)	65.1 (18.4)	68.5 (20.3)	67.6 (19.8)	61.6 (16.4)	49.1 (9.5)	38.8 (3.8)	33.8 (1.0)	49.8 (9.9)
Average precipitation inches (mm)	3.91 (99)	3.61 (92)	4.17 (106)	2.79 (71)	2.99 (76)	3.72 (94)	3.83 (97)	3.25 (83)	3.35 (85)	3.03 (77)	3.32 (84)	4.04 (103)	42.01 (1,067)
Average precipitation days (≥ 0.01 in)	10.0	9.9	9.7	9.1	9.7	10.8	11.6	10.8	8.7	8.3	9.2	10.5	118.3
Source: NOAA

== Demographics ==
Historical population
Census	Pop.	Note	%±
1850	941		—
1870	700		—
1880	745		6.4%
1890	1,326		78.0%
1900	4,824		263.8%
1910	6,614		37.1%
1920	8,703		31.6%
1930	11,020		26.6%
1940	13,020		18.1%
1950	13,806		6.0%
1960	16,644		20.6%
1970	21,069		26.6%
1980	21,613		2.6%
1990	20,807		−3.7%
2000	22,071		6.1%
2010	23,222		5.2%
2020	22,545		−2.9%
2025 (est.)	22,745	▲	0.9%
U.S. Decennial Census

=== 2020 census ===
As of the 2020 census, Greenwood had a population of 22,545, 8,925 households, and 4,878 families residing in the city. The median age was 34.3 years, with 22.5% of residents under the age of 18 and 16.6% 65 years of age or older. For every 100 females there were 81.2 males, and for every 100 females age 18 and over there were 75.6 males age 18 and over.

98.7% of residents lived in urban areas, while 1.3% lived in rural areas.

There were 8,925 households in Greenwood, of which 29.7% had children under the age of 18 living in them. Of all households, 28.2% were married-couple households, 22.4% were households with a male householder and no spouse or partner present, and 42.5% were households with a female householder and no spouse or partner present. About 36.7% of all households were made up of individuals and 14.8% had someone living alone who was 65 years of age or older.

There were 10,024 housing units, of which 11.0% were vacant. The homeowner vacancy rate was 2.2% and the rental vacancy rate was 8.2%.

Racial composition as of the 2020 census
Race	Number	Percent
White	9,285	41.2%
Black or African American	9,837	43.6%
American Indian and Alaska Native	90	0.4%
Asian	241	1.1%
Native Hawaiian and Other Pacific Islander	20	0.1%
Some other race	1,821	8.1%
Two or more races	1,251	5.5%
Hispanic or Latino (of any race)	2,827	12.5%

=== 2000 census ===
As of the census 2000, there were 22,071 people, 8,496 households, and 5,174 families residing in the city. The population density was 1,612.1 inhabitants per square mile (622.4/km^{2}). There were 9,373 housing units at an average density of 684.6 per square mile (264.3/km^{2}). The racial makeup of the city was 50.10% White, 45.51% African American, 0.19% Native American, 0.87% Asian, 0.07% Pacific Islander, 2.41% from other races, and 0.85% from two or more races. Hispanic or Latino of any race were 6.52% of the population.

There were 8,496 households, out of which 28.6% had children under the age of 18 living with them, 34.5% were married couples living together, 21.0% had a female householder with no husband present, and 39.1% were non-families. 32.4% of all households were made up of individuals, and 12.9% had someone living alone who was 65 years of age or older. The average household size was 2.41 and the average family size was 3.05.

In the city, the population was spread out, with 24.7% under the age of 18, 15.2% from 18 to 24, 27.3% from 25 to 44, 17.6% from 45 to 64, and 15.2% who were 65 years of age or older. The median age was 32 years. For every 100 females, there were 86.6 males. For every 100 females age 18 and over, there were 82.5 males.

The median income for a household in the city was $26,284, and the median income for a family was $32,573. Males had a median income of $26,477 versus $21,476 for females. The per capita income for the city was $14,347. About 22.2% of families and 40.4% of the population were below the poverty line, including 34.4% of those under age 18 and 18.0% of those age 65 or over.

== Economy ==
The most common employment sectors for residents of Greenwood are manufacturing, retail trade, and healthcare and social assistance.

In 2015, the Greenwood educational institution with the largest number of graduating students was Lander University, with 494 graduates.

The median property value in Greenwood grew from $86,800 in 2014 to $87,800 in 2015.

67.4% of the city population over the age of sixteen is in the civilian labor force.

As of September 2017, the unemployment rate in Greenwood County was 4.0%.

== Arts and culture ==
=== South Carolina Festival of Flowers ===
Greenwood's first South Carolina Festival of Flowers was held in the summer of 1968 to coincide with the 100th anniversary celebration of George W. Park Seed Company. The festival was the brainchild of what was known then as the Tourist and Conventions Committee of the Greenwood Chamber of Commerce. Chamber Director Al Parker and committee members recognized that Park Seed Company hosted "grower days" each year and that hundreds of professional flower growers would come to Greenwood to meander through Park Seed's famous trial gardens (the gardens closed in 2013). The committee thought it would be a good idea to capitalize on having those visitors see other venues in Greenwood.

Dick Stowe, chair of the Tourist and Conventions Committee, served as the first Festival Chairman, and Judy Funderburk of Bennettsville was crowned Princess of Flowers. During the festival's early years, admission was free to most events, including the Park Seed gardens and open house, arts and craft show, photo exhibit, military band concerts and other popular attractions.

Since then, the festival has grown to include a wide array of activities, many added under the leadership of Frank Cuda, who was Festival Director from 1992 to 2006. In 2007, the festival celebrated its 40th anniversary and welcomed Kay Self as the new executive director.

In 2008, the South Carolina Festival of Flowers introduced a new logo celebrating its Carolina roots. The logo features yellow jessamine (the state flower) encircling the words "Festival of Flowers" with two Carolina wrens (the state bird) perched below.

Also in 2008, the Topiary Project was launched, which has become the signature event. Presently, there are 42 topiaries on the square in Greenwood.

Then in 2009, the festival gained regional recognition by winning four Excellence Awards at the Carolina Showfest Convention. The awards were for "Best Merchandise", "Best Website", and "Overall Event of the Year" for South and North Carolina, and Executive Director Kay Self was recognized as "South Carolina Director of the Year".

Ellesor G. Holder took the helm in 2011 for the 44th Festival of Flowers. She rebranded the festival with a more distinctive and contemporary logo which symbolized the diversity and floral history of the festival. Under Holder's leadership, the festival received the SC Festival & Event Association's Excellence Award, 2013 Event of the Year. She also garnered two Silver Awards for the festival's 2013 TV ad and mobile application/website at the International Festival and Events Association Conference.

The South Carolina Festival of Flowers continues to be named one of the Southeast Tourism Society's "Top Twenty Events".

Attendance at the festival has steadily grown, reaching a record of over 80,000 visitors in the past few years. In 2016, the economic impact of the Festival of Flowers was $3,300,000.

The South Carolina Festival of Flowers is a division of the Greenwood Chamber of Commerce and shares the same board of directors.

=== Festival of Discovery ===
The South Carolina Festival of Discovery is sponsored by the Uptown Greenwood Development Corporation. The event started in 2000, celebrating the history, culture, food, arts, crafts, music and people of South Carolina and Greenwood County.

The Festival of Discovery's "Blues Cruise" celebrates the sound of the blues, with numerous musical artists performing at Uptown Greenwood restaurants and venues, while the Kansas City Barbeque Society (KCBS) BBQ and Hash Cook-Off focuses on the rich tradition of Carolina barbecue.

=== Registered historic sites ===
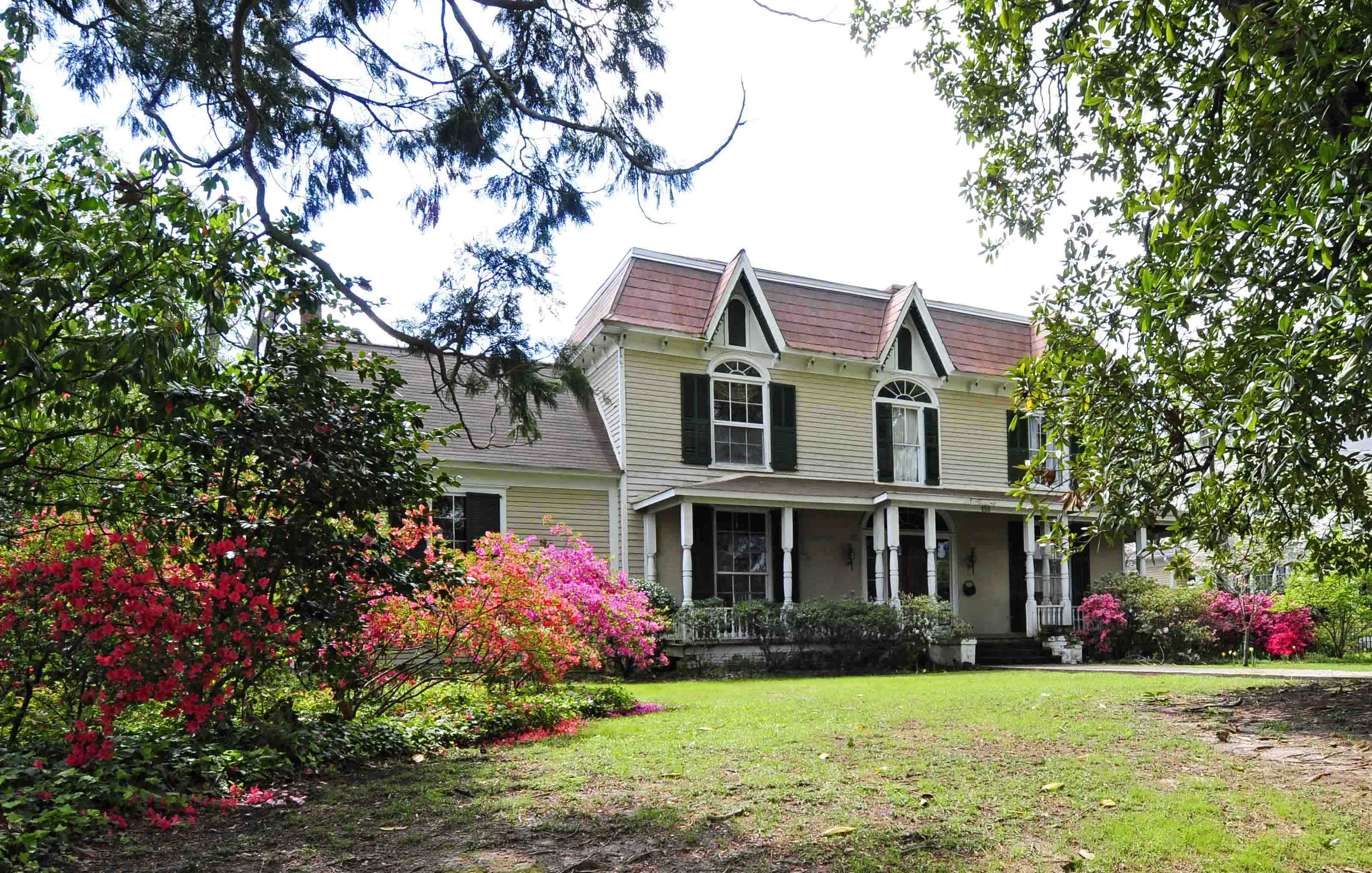
Vance-Maxwell House

The Barratt House, J. Wesley Brooks House, Lander College Old Main Building, Magnolia Cemetery, Mt. Pisgah A.M.E. Church, Old Greenwood Cemetery, Old Greenwood High School, James C. Self House, Stony Point, Sunnyside, Tabernacle Cemetery, and the Vance-Maxwell House are listed on the National Register of Historic Places.

== Government ==
Greenwood is governed via a council-manager system. The mayor is elected at-large. The city council consists of six nonpartisan members who are each elected from one of six single-member district wards. The current mayor of Greenwood is Brandon Smith. Mr. Smith was sworn in on Monday, November 19, 2018. He won election for the office vacated by Mayor Welborn Adams who decided not to seek re-election.

Greenwood City Council
Ward	Council member	First elected	Current term
Mayor	Brandon Smith	2018	11/2022-11/2026
Ward 1	Niki Hutto	2000	11/2020-11/2024
Ward 2	Robert Dean	2022	11/2022-11/2026
Ward 3	Betty Boles	2003	11/2020-11/2024
Ward 4	Johnathan Bass	2019	11/2022-11/2026
Ward 5	Matthew Miller	2016	11/2020-11/2024
Ward 6	Ronnie Ables	2010	11/2022-11/2026

Leath Correctional Institution, a South Carolina Department of Corrections prison for women, is located in unincorporated Greenwood County 5 miles (8 km) north of the center of Greenwood.

== Education ==
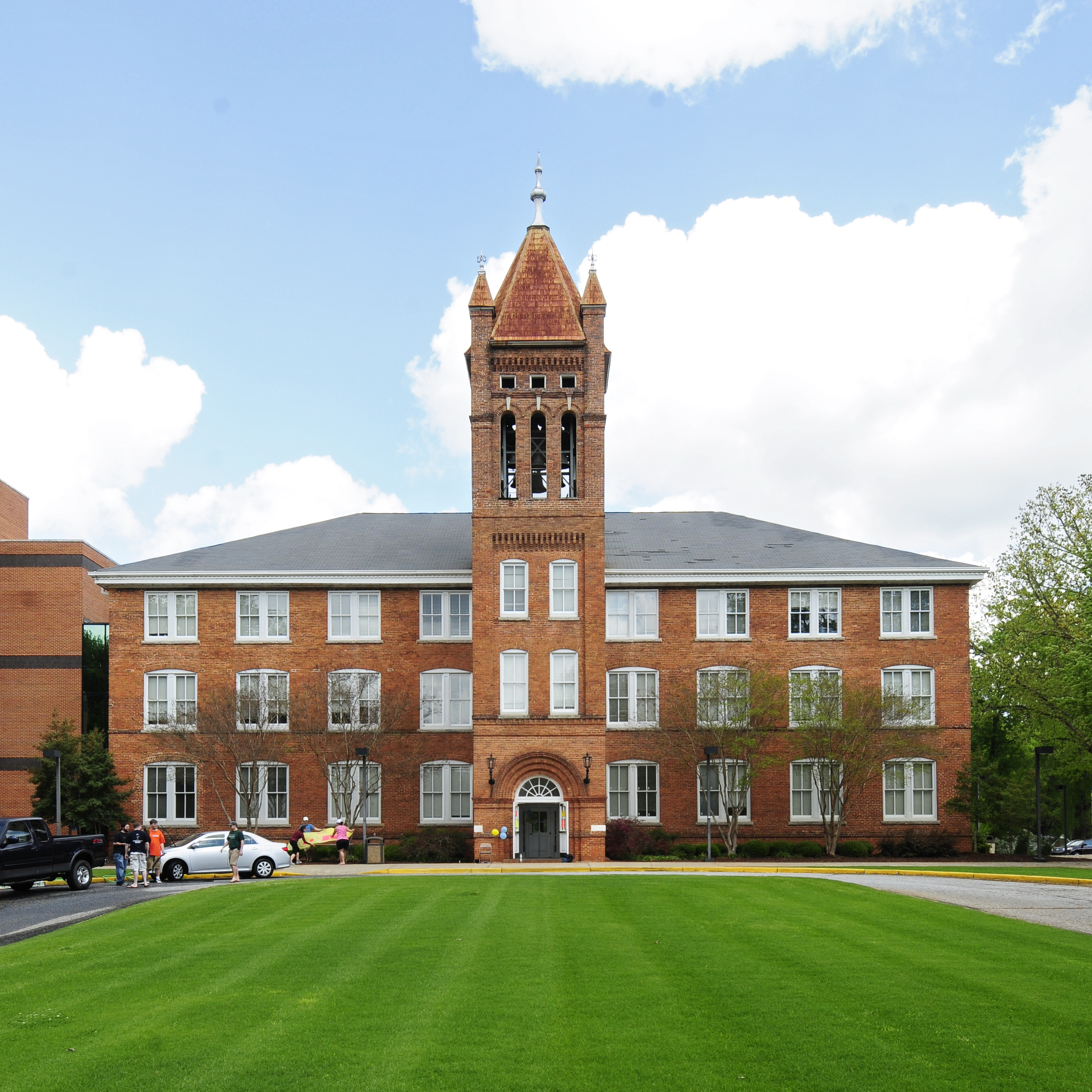
Lander University

The city of Greenwood is a part of Greenwood County School District 50, and offers public schooling up to the secondary level, including career and technology education.

Greenwood District 50 consists of the following schools:

High (with enrollment):
- Greenwood High School (1,700)
- Emerald High School (950)
Middle:
- Westview Middle School
- Brewer Middle School
- Northside Middle School
The three middle schools take portions of the city, and Emerald and Greenwood highs have attendance boundaries with portions of the city.
Elementary:
The following elementary schools take portions of the city limits:
- Lakeview Elementary
- Mathews Elementary
- Merrywood Elementary
- Eleanor S. Rice Elementary (formerly Oakland Elementary)
- Pinecrest Elementary
- Dr. Benjamin E. Mays Elementary School (formerly Springfield Elementary)
- Woodfields Elementary
(Hodges Elementary School does not have an attendance boundary including sections of the Greenwood city limits)

Private schools:

- Greenwood Christian School
- Eastside Christian School
- Palmetto Christian Academy
- Cambridge Academy

Post-secondary:

- Lander University
- Piedmont Technical College

Greenwood has a public library, a branch of the Greenwood County Library System.

== Infrastructure ==
The city is served by Greenwood County Airport.

== Notable people ==
- Gaines Adams, former defensive end for NFL's Chicago Bears
- Pinky Babb, coached Greenwood High School for 39 years
- Robert Brooks, former NFL wide receiver for Green Bay Packers and Denver Broncos.
- Tomiko Brown-Nagin, legal historian and professor at Harvard Law School
- Ben Coates, starting tight end for New England Patriots 1991–99
- Johnny Corley, soul singer
- William Jennings Bryan Dorn, former U.S. and state representative
- John W. Drummond, South Carolina businessman and legislator
- Armanti Edwards, quarterback for Appalachian State Mountaineers football team
- John Gilliam, former NFL wide receiver, four-time Pro Bowler
- Allisha Gray, professional basketball player for WNBA's Atlanta Dream, Olympian, 4× WNBA All-Star (2023–2026), 2017 WNBA Rookie of the Year
- Keith Harling, country music artist
- Lawrence L. Hester, politician
- Grainger Hines, Greenwood native and actor
- Leroy Jenkins, Televangelist
- William "Hootie" Johnson, former chairman of Augusta National golf course
- Gregg Marshall, head coach of Wichita State University's men's basketball program
- Benjamin Mays, minister and president of Morehouse College
- John McKissick, national high school football leader in coaching victories
- Sam Montgomery, drafted by Houston Texans in third round of 2013 NFL draft
- Josh Norman, drafted by Carolina Panthers in 2012
- Marrio Norman, football player
- George Singleton, author
- Jerome Singleton, Paralympic athlete
- Chino Smith, former Negro leagues player
- D. J. Swearinger, all-SEC conference safety for South Carolina Gamecocks
- The Swingin' Medallions, 1960s beach music group
- Willie James Tolbert, executed for rape in 1949
- Bill Voiselle, professional baseball player.
