= Greenwood County, South Carolina =

County in South Carolina, United States

- County
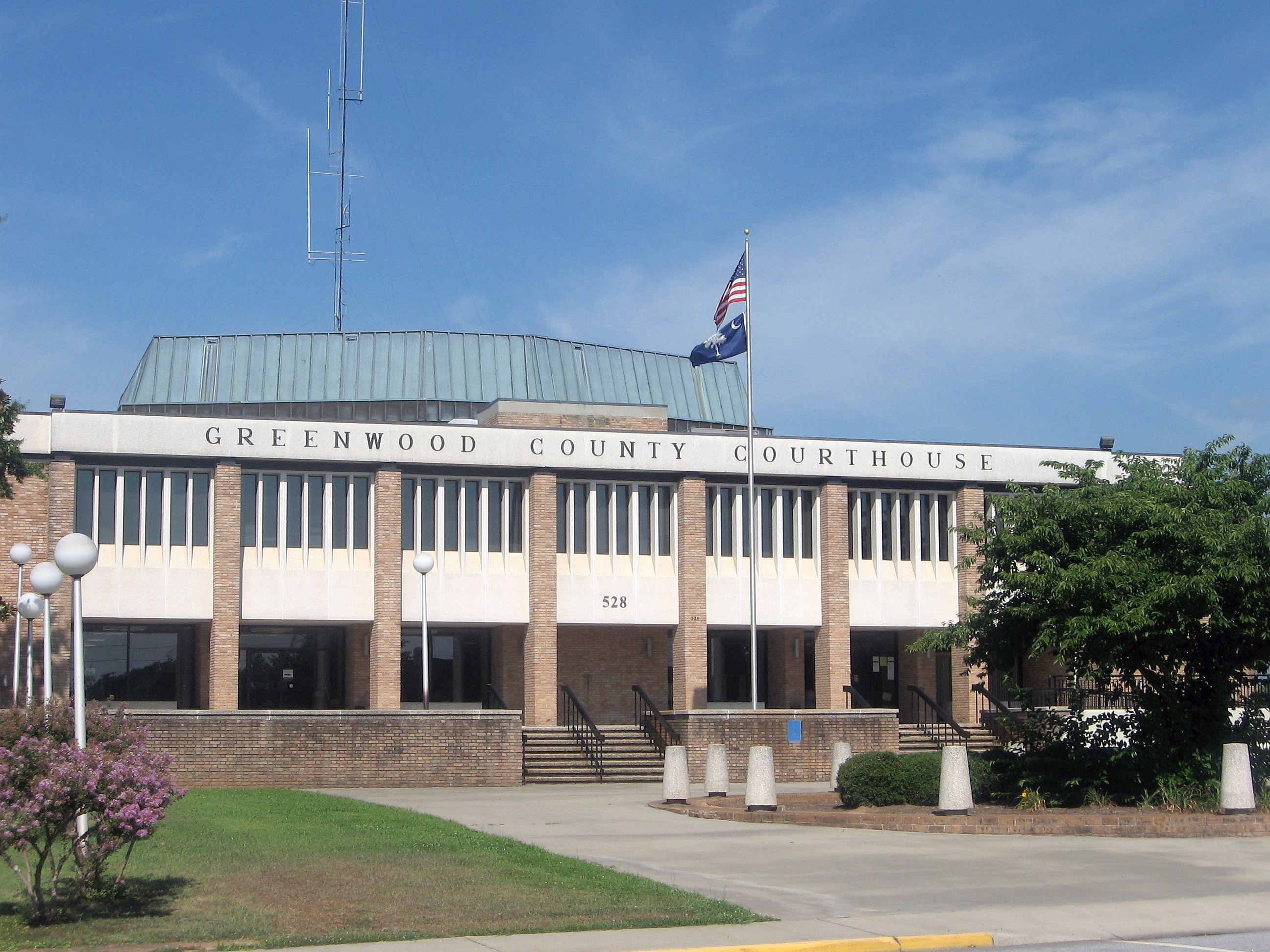
- Greenwood County Courthouse

- Seal

- Location within the U.S. state of South Carolina
- Interactive map of Greenwood County, South Carolina
- Coordinates: 34.16°N 82.13°W
- Country: United States
- State: South Carolina
- Founded: 1897
- Named for: Greenwood, South Carolina
- Seat: Greenwood
- Largest community: Greenwood

Area
  - Total: 463.81 sq mi (1,201.3 km^{2})
  - Land: 455.60 sq mi (1,180.0 km^{2})
  - Water: 8.21 sq mi (21.3 km^{2}) 1.77%

Population (2020)
  - Total: 69,351
  - Estimate (2025): 70,379 ▲
  - Density: 152.22/sq mi (58.772/km^{2})
- Time zone: UTC−5 (Eastern)
  - Summer (DST): UTC−4 (EDT)
- Congressional district: 3rd
- Website: www.greenwoodcounty-sc.gov

Greenwood County is a county located in the U.S. state of South Carolina. As of the 2020 census, its population was 69,351. Its county seat is Greenwood. Among the 22 counties located in the Piedmont of the state, Greenwood County is the largest county within the Greenwood, SC Micropolitan Statistical Area.

== History ==
In the colonial years, English and Scots traders from Charles Town (later known as Charleston) were the first Europeans to make regular forays into this back country, part of the traditional territory of the Cherokee Nation, which had numerous towns on the upper tributaries of the Savannah River, especially along the Keowee River. Their territory extended into modern western North Carolina, eastern Tennessee and northeastern Georgia. The traders called this route in South Carolina the "Cherokee Path."

The trade in deerskins was highly lucrative, and traders passed on information among them about landmarks and the distances to their customers in the Nation. They estimated mileage between streams based on their day's travel. They noted unusual aspects, such as the six creeks that ran unexpectedly south away from the Saluda River and, further west, nine creeks that ran south away from the Savannah River, noting them on maps as "6" and "9". A town in this area and a district both became known as "Ninety-Six", which historian David P. George believes is related to traders' references to these two landmark groups of streams. Using historical accounts and USGS maps, he and other historians have traced the Cherokee Path across present-day Greenwood County, territory that at the time was part of other districts.

After the Cherokee were removed from the area through treaty cessions and Indian Removal, European Americans moved in, developing large cotton plantations that were dependent on the labor of enslaved Africans. This upland region of the Piedmont supported widespread cultivation of short-staple cotton, a variety made profitable by the late 18th-century invention of the cotton gin for processing it. Cotton was the chief commodity of the South before the Civil War, and was important afterward as well. The construction of the Charlotte and South Carolina Railroad in 1852 in this area enabled planters to more easily get their products to market.

The railway also stimulated the development of textile manufacturing in the Piedmont in the late nineteenth century. Previously most cotton had been shipped to the North (New York and New England) for processing and manufacture, or to England and Europe. The rise of textile manufacturing in the South altered the economy and society of the region. The first cotton mill in Greenwood opened in 1890 with 75 workers. (As labor was highly segregated, factory owners hired only white workers for decades.) When the mill nearly failed in 1908, James C. Self became president of Greenwood Cotton Mill and built one of the largest privately held companies in the industry. Abney Mills, based in Greenwood, developed more production plants across the upstate.

Greenwood County was formed in 1897 from portions of Abbeville and Edgefield counties, which had originally been part of the old Ninety-Six District. It was named for its county seat, Greenwood. The town was named around 1824 after a cotton plantation owned by John McGehee, an early resident. The county and region has continued to be agricultural in the 21st century, although crops have changed.

In the late nineteenth century, conservative white Democrats had continued efforts to suppress black voting, through fraud and violence. Beginning with Mississippi in 1890, state legislatures passed new constitutions and laws that essentially disenfranchised most blacks. They maintained this political exclusion for decades, weakening the Republican Party throughout the South, where it had chiefly attracted freedmen and their descendants. South Carolina passed such a constitution in 1895 but violence continued around elections as African Americans tried to vote for Republican candidates. White Democrats were determined to regain power after a fusionist ticket had been elected at the state level.

In November 1898 the Phoenix Election riot broke out, after an armed altercation at the polling place. The Republican Congressional candidate was Rhett R. Tolbert. He came from a major planter family in the area. His brother Thomas P. Jr, was collecting affidavits in Phoenix from African Americans who wanted to vote for Tolbert but had been prevented from doing so. Democrat Giels O. Ethridge, came from a polling place two miles away and confronted him. Ethridge was fatally shot; blacks were accused of killing him. White Democrats attacked Republican Thomas Tolbert and African Americans with him, wounding them seriously. (Tolbert later said that Ethridge was shot by his own people.) John R. Tolbert, their father, was also wounded, and he and another son Joseph fled to Charleston, where the senior Tolbert was US customs officer of the port. Violence took place throughout the Phoenix area for four days, with armed groups of whites coming from around the county to hunt down black suspects. A mob of 600–1000 armed white men had gathered in Phoenix before events ended. Several African-American men were killed; at least six were lynched near Rehoboth Church. An inquest concluded their deaths were from "persons unknown."

This region continued to depend on agriculture, which was struggling. Cotton crops throughout the South were damaged by the boll weevil. Many African Americans left this and other rural counties in the early 20th century in the Great Migration from 1910 to 1940, to escape Jim Crow suppression and violence, and gain jobs in industrial cities of the North and Midwest.

The Great Depression of the 1930s altered the economy and landscape of Greenwood County. Farmers were impoverished, and land values declined. As local textile mills struggled to survive, they resisted union efforts to organize the workers. After 1933, New Deal programs of the Franklin D. Roosevelt administration offered limited work relief for the unemployed, as the federal government invested in numerous local infrastructure programs to provide jobs and build for the future.

The largest New Deal project in the area was construction of Buzzard's Roost Dam on the Saluda River to impound Lake Greenwood and generate electricity at a county-owned power plant. Since then, the county sold the hydroelectric plant to Duke Power Company, which dominates the regional market. The lake offers residents and visitors an array of recreational facilities.

Since 1950, Greenwood County has developed a diversified industrial base. New factories have been constructed by such major corporations as Capsugel (Lonza), Fujifilm, Monsanto (Ascend), and VELUX.

== Geography ==
According to the U.S. Census Bureau, the county has a total area of 463.81 square miles (1,201.3 km^{2}), of which 455.60 square miles (1,180.0 km^{2}) is land and 8.21 square miles (21.3 km^{2}) (1.77%) is water. Greenwood County is in the basins of the Savannah and the Saluda rivers.

=== National protected areas/sites ===
- Cedar Springs Historic District
- Ninety Six National Historic Site
- Sumter National Forest (part)

=== State and local protected areas ===
- Lake Greenwood State Park
- Long Cane Scenic Area

=== Major water bodies ===
- Halfway Swamp Creek
- Lake Greenwood
- Saluda River

=== Adjacent counties ===
- Laurens County – north
- Newberry County – northeast
- Edgefield County - southeast
- Saluda County – southeast
- McCormick County – southwest
- Abbeville County – west

=== Major highways ===
- US 25
- US 25 Bus. (Greenwood)
- US 25 Bus. (Ware Shoals)
- US 178
- US 178 Bus.
- US 221
- SC 10
- SC 34
- SC 72
- SC 72 Bus.
- SC 246
- SC 248
- SC 252
- SC 252 Bus.
- SC 252 Truck
- SC 702

=== Airport ===
- Greenwood County Airport

== Demographics ==
Historical population
Census	Pop.	Note	%±
1900	28,343		—
1910	34,225		20.8%
1920	35,791		4.6%
1930	36,078		0.8%
1940	40,083		11.1%
1950	41,628		3.9%
1960	44,346		6.5%
1970	49,686		12.0%
1980	57,847		16.4%
1990	59,567		3.0%
2000	66,271		11.3%
2010	69,661		5.1%
2020	69,351		−0.4%
2025 (est.)	70,379	▲	1.5%
U.S. Decennial Census; 1790–1960 1900–1990; 1990–2000 2010 2020

=== Racial and ethnic composition ===
Greenwood County, South Carolina – Racial and ethnic composition Note: the US Census treats Hispanic/Latino as an ethnic category. This table excludes Latinos from the racial categories and assigns them to a separate category. Hispanics/Latinos may be of any race.
Race / Ethnicity (NH = Non-Hispanic)	Pop 1980	Pop 1990	Pop 2000	Pop 2010	Pop 2020	% 1980	% 1990	% 2000	% 2010	% 2020
White alone (NH)	40,722	41,108	42,489	42,709	40,625	70.40%	69.01%	64.11%	61.31%	58.58%
Black or African American alone (NH)	16,510	17,923	20,893	21,728	20,820	28.54%	30.09%	31.53%	31.19%	30.02%
Native American or Alaska Native alone (NH)	39	50	95	139	102	0.07%	0.08%	0.14%	0.20%	0.15%
Asian alone (NH)	123	232	460	568	678	0.21%	0.39%	0.69%	0.82%	0.98%
Native Hawaiian or Pacific Islander alone (NH)	x	x	11	11	41	x	x	0.02%	0.02%	0.06%
Other race alone (NH)	36	3	40	86	185	0.06%	0.01%	0.06%	0.12%	0.27%
Mixed race or Multiracial (NH)	x	x	381	631	2,151	x	x	0.57%	0.91%	3.10%
Hispanic or Latino (any race)	417	251	1,902	3,789	4,749	0.72%	0.42%	2.87%	5.44%	6.85%
Total	57,847	59,567	66,271	69,661	69,351	100.00%	100.00%	100.00%	100.00%	100.00%

=== 2020 census ===
As of the 2020 census, there were 69,351 people, 28,123 households, and 17,855 families residing in the county. The median age was 40.4 years; 21.8% of residents were under the age of 18 and 19.7% of residents were 65 years of age or older. For every 100 females there were 86.3 males, and for every 100 females age 18 and over there were 82.3 males age 18 and over.

The racial makeup of the county was 59.4% White, 30.2% Black or African American, 0.2% American Indian and Alaska Native, 1.0% Asian, 0.1% Native Hawaiian and Pacific Islander, 4.3% from some other race, and 4.8% from two or more races. Hispanic or Latino residents of any race comprised 6.8% of the population, as shown in the table above.

60.3% of residents lived in urban areas, while 39.7% lived in rural areas.

There were 31,323 housing units, of which 10.2% were vacant. Among occupied housing units, 65.3% were owner-occupied and 34.7% were renter-occupied. The homeowner vacancy rate was 1.4% and the rental vacancy rate was 7.8%.

=== 2010 census ===
At the 2010 census, there were 69,661 people, 27,547 households, and 18,438 families living in the county. The population density was 153.2 inhabitants per square mile (59.2 inhabitants/km^{2}). There were 31,054 housing units at an average density of 68.3 units per square mile (26.4 units/km^{2}). The racial makeup of the county was 62.9% white, 31.4% black or African American, 0.8% Asian, 0.3% American Indian, 3.5% from other races, and 1.2% from two or more races. Those of Hispanic or Latino origin made up 5.4% of the population. In terms of ancestry, 31.4% were of African descent, 17.8% identified as American, 8.7% as of English descent, 8.2% as ethnic Irish, and 8.0% as German.

Of the 27,547 households, 32.9% had children under the age of 18 living with them, 44.4% were married couples living together, 17.5% had a female householder with no husband present, 33.1% were non-families, and 27.9% of all households were made up of individuals. The average household size was 2.43 and the average family size was 2.96. The median age was 37.9 years.

The median income for a household in the county was $38,797 and the median income for a family was $49,785. Males had a median income of $36,806 versus $29,327 for females. The per capita income for the county was $21,728. About 12.8% of families and 17.6% of the population were below the poverty line, including 27.3% of those under age 18 and 9.7% of those age 65 or over.

=== 2000 census ===
At the 2000 census, there were 66,271 people, 25,729 households, and 17,753 families living in the county. The population density was 146 people per square mile (56 people/km^{2}). There were 28,243 housing units at an average density of 62 units per square mile (24 units/km^{2}). The racial makeup of the county was 65.57% White, 31.74% Black or African American, 0.18% Native American, 0.71% Asian, 0.04% Pacific Islander, 1.03% from other races, and 0.74% from two or more races. 2.87% of the population were Hispanic or Latino of any race.

There were 25,729 households, out of which 31.70% had children under the age of 18 living with them, 48.70% were married couples living together, 16.10% had a female householder with no husband present, and 31.00% were non-families. 26.30% of all households were made up of individuals, and 10.60% had someone living alone who was 65 years of age or older. The average household size was 2.49 and the average family size was 3.00.

In the county, the population was spread out, with 25.50% under the age of 18, 10.40% from 18 to 24, 28.20% from 25 to 44, 22.20% from 45 to 64, and 13.70% who were 65 years of age or older. The median age was 35 years. For every 100 females there were 88.40 males. For every 100 females age 18 and over, there were 84.60 males.

The median income for a household in the county was $34,702, and the median income for a family was $42,022. Males had a median income of $30,759 versus $23,820 for females. The per capita income for the county was $17,446. About 9.90% of families and 14.20% of the population were below the poverty line, including 17.70% of those under age 18 and 14.10% of those age 65 or over.

== Government and politics ==
Leath Correctional Institution, a South Carolina Department of Corrections prison for women, is located in unincorporated Greenwood County, near Greenwood.

United States presidential election results for Greenwood County, South Carolina
Year	Republican		Democratic		Third party(ies)	
Year	No.	%	No.	%	No.	%
1900	4	0.27%	1,482	99.73%	0	0.00%
1904	1	0.08%	1,332	99.92%	0	0.00%
1912	17	1.27%	1,307	97.68%	14	1.05%
1916	13	0.79%	1,636	98.91%	5	0.30%
1920	15	0.95%	1,568	99.05%	0	0.00%
1924	15	0.82%	1,815	98.96%	4	0.22%
1928	38	1.28%	2,921	98.72%	0	0.00%
1932	15	0.46%	3,240	99.54%	0	0.00%
1936	19	0.62%	3,064	99.38%	0	0.00%
1940	39	1.32%	2,914	98.68%	0	0.00%
1944	71	2.64%	2,381	88.64%	234	8.71%
1948	63	2.09%	440	14.60%	2,511	83.31%
1952	3,392	47.07%	3,815	52.93%	0	0.00%
1956	1,120	16.59%	4,386	64.95%	1,247	18.47%
1960	2,968	35.97%	5,283	64.03%	0	0.00%
1964	5,653	50.78%	5,479	49.22%	0	0.00%
1968	4,891	33.37%	3,741	25.52%	6,026	41.11%
1972	9,370	72.22%	3,400	26.20%	205	1.58%
1976	5,974	37.36%	9,976	62.39%	41	0.26%
1980	7,290	43.17%	9,283	54.97%	315	1.87%
1984	10,887	62.91%	6,339	36.63%	81	0.47%
1988	9,096	57.92%	6,511	41.46%	97	0.62%
1992	9,079	47.98%	7,621	40.27%	2,223	11.75%
1996	8,865	48.81%	8,193	45.11%	1,105	6.08%
2000	12,193	58.45%	8,139	39.02%	528	2.53%
2004	14,264	60.85%	8,954	38.20%	224	0.96%
2008	16,995	57.29%	12,348	41.62%	324	1.09%
2012	16,348	57.02%	11,972	41.76%	352	1.23%
2016	16,961	58.97%	10,711	37.24%	1,091	3.79%
2020	19,431	60.71%	12,145	37.95%	430	1.34%
2024	19,715	63.83%	10,766	34.85%	407	1.32%

== Economy ==
Greenwood County has developed a modern and diverse economic base. Fujifilm has its North American headquarters there for research and development, as well as manufacturing and distribution. The Greenwood Genetic Center conducts nationally recognized genetics research. Approximately 26% of the local workforce is dedicated to manufacturing.

In 2015, the median household income in Greenwood County, SC was $37,060, a 2.82% increase from the previous year. Also in 2015, 28,506 residents in Greenwood County, SC were employed, a 1.03% growth over 2014. The most common employment sectors for residents of Greenwood County are Manufacturing, Healthcare & Social Assistance, and Retail trade.

The overall cost of living index in Greenwood County, SC, is 83, which is 13% lower than the South Carolina average and 17% lower than the national average. The cost of living index is created from the following categories: goods/services (33%), groceries (13%), health care (5%), housing (30%), transportation (9%) and utilities (10%). The cost of everyday goods and services can be a good indicator of the general cost of goods in a given city. In this case, the cost of such goods and services in Greenwood is 7% lower than the South Carolina average and 6% lower than the national average.

Major employers in Greenwood County include Self Regional Healthcare, Greenwood County School Districts, Eaton Corporation, FujiFilm Manufacturing, U.S.A.; Carolina Pride, Capsugel, Lander University, Piedmont Technical College, Cardinal Health, Ascend Performance Materials, and VELUX.

Major existing industry clusters include Life Sciences, Food Processing, Advance Materials, and Wood Products.

The per capita personal income in Greenwood County, SC as of 2015 was $33,723. The Unemployment rate in Greenwood County, SC was 4.0% as of Sept 2017. The median household income in Greenwood County was $42,240 as of 2015. In 2022, the GDP was $4.2 billion (about $59,778 per capita), and the real GDP was $3.4 billion (about $48,574 per capita) in chained 2017 dollars.

Employment and Wage Statistics by Industry in Greenwood County, South Carolina - Q3 2023
Industry	Employment Counts	Employment Percentage (%)	Average Annual Wage ($)
Accommodation and Food Services	2,635	9.7	18,200
Administrative and Support and Waste Management and Remediation Services	849	3.1	43,576
Agriculture, Forestry, Fishing and Hunting	94	0.3	59,488
Arts, Entertainment, and Recreation	241	0.9	17,576
Construction	1,079	4.0	55,900
Educational Services	2,520	9.3	49,504
Finance and Insurance	509	1.9	64,168
Health Care and Social Assistance	5,988	22.1	65,208
Information	128	0.5	48,152
Management of Companies and Enterprises	108	0.4	93,236
Manufacturing	5,365	19.8	63,232
Other Services (except Public Administration)	507	1.9	38,688
Professional, Scientific, and Technical Services	495	1.8	61,048
Public Administration	1,212	4.5	46,644
Real Estate and Rental and Leasing	274	1.0	38,844
Retail Trade	3,458	12.8	30,056
Transportation and Warehousing	501	1.9	47,372
Utilities	248	0.9	72,644
Wholesale Trade	839	3.1	76,648
Total	27,050	100.0%	51,218

== Education ==
Greenwood County has three school districts: Greenwood School District 50 (Greenwood Metro), Greenwood School District 51 (Ware Shoals), and Greenwood School District 52 (Ninety Six).

=== School districts ===
- Greenwood School District 50 serves families in the Greenwood metro area. This school system consists of 8 elementary schools, 3 middle schools, 2 high schools, a career center, and an adult education center. The current superintendent of District 50 is Dr. Steve Glenn.
- Greenwood School District 51 serves families in the town of Ware Shoals, as well as students from surrounding areas of Greenwood, Abbeville, and Laurens counties. Two of the three schools are located in the town limits of Ware Shoals (Greenwood County) while the other school is located in Laurens County.
- Greenwood School District 52 serves families in the town of Ninety Six and surrounding areas of Greenwood County.

=== Elementary schools ===
- Benjamin E. Mays Elementary School (K4–5)
- Hodges Elementary School (K–5)
- Lakeview Elementary School (K4–5)
- Mathews Elementary School (K4–5)
- Merrywood Elementary School (K4–5)
- Ninety Six Elementary School (3–5)
- Ninety Six Primary School (K4–2)
- Pinecrest Elementary School (K4–5)
- Rice Elementary School (K4–5)
- Ware Shoals Elementary School (4–6)
- Ware Shoals Primary School (PreK–3)
- Woodfields Elementary School (K4–5)

=== Middle schools ===
- Brewer Middle School (6–8)
- Edgewood Middle School (6–8)
- Northside Middle School (6–8)
- Westview Middle School (6–8)

=== High schools ===
- Emerald High School (9–12)
- Greenwood High School (9–12)
- Ninety Six High School (9–12)
- Ware Shoals High School (7–12)

=== Higher education ===
- Lander University (4-Year State Supported Liberal Arts University)
- Piedmont Technical College

=== Alternate education centers ===
- G. Frank Russell Technology Center (9–12)
- Genesis Education Center (7–12) and Adult Education

== Communities ==
=== City ===
- Greenwood (county seat and largest community)

=== Towns ===
- Hodges
- Ninety Six
- Troy
- Ware Shoals (partly in Abbeville and Laurens counties)

=== Census-designated places ===
Some communities in the county are census designated places.

- Bradley
- Cokesbury
- Coronaca
- Promised Land

=== Unincorporated communities ===
Some communities in the county are unincorporated.

- Callison
- Epworth
- Kirksey
- Phoenix
- Pittsburg
- Shoals Junction
- Verdery

=== Townships ===
In the past, Greenwood County was partitioned into townships, including the townships of Bradley (including Bradley town), Brooks, Callison, Cokesbury (including Cokesbury town), Coronaca (including Coronaca town), Fellowship, Greenwood (with three partitions in the 1900 census – Greenwood east of the Columbia and Greenville Railroad, Greenwood west of the railroad, and Greenwood town), Hodges (including Hodges town), Kinards, Kirksey, Ninety Six (including Ninety Six town), Phoenix, Troy (including Troy town), Verdery (including Verdery town), Walnut Grove and Yeldell. Their former names and boundaries were used for United States census counting purposes and census documentation through 1960, after which Census Counting Divisions (CCDs) were used.

== See also ==
- List of counties in South Carolina
- National Register of Historic Places listings in Greenwood County, South Carolina
