= National Register of Historic Places listings in Laurens County, South Carolina =

Location of Laurens County in South Carolina

This is a list of the National Register of Historic Places listings in Laurens County, South Carolina.

This is intended to be a complete list of the properties and districts on the National Register of Historic Places in Laurens County, South Carolina, United States. The locations of National Register properties and districts for which the latitude and longitude coordinates are included below, may be seen in a map.

There are 27 properties and districts listed on the National Register in the county.

This National Park Service list is complete through NPS recent listings posted September 19, 2025.

== Current listings ==
	Name on the Register	Image	Date listed	Location	City or town	Description
1	Albright-Dukes House	Albright-Dukes House	November 19, 1986 (#86003149)	127 Academy St. 34°29′25″N 82°01′05″W	Laurens	
2	Charlton Hall Plantation House	Charlton Hall Plantation House	May 26, 1995 (#95000633)	South Carolina Highway 101, approximately 2.5 miles south of Hickory Tavern; 34°29′40″N 82°10′06″W	Hickory Tavern	
3	Clinton Commercial Historic District	Clinton Commercial Historic District	November 15, 1984 (#84000577)	Main, Broad, Pitts, Musgrove and Gary Sts.; also 209-225 West Main St. 34°28′23″N 81°52′52″W	Clinton	Boundary adjustments were approved March 16, 2020
4	Lyde Irby Darlington House	Lyde Irby Darlington House	November 19, 1986 (#86003150)	110 Irby Ave. 34°29′41″N 82°01′05″W	Laurens	
5	Allen Dial House	Allen Dial House	January 21, 1982 (#82003874)	South Carolina Highway 729; 34°28′36″N 82°06′05″W	Laurens	
6	Charles H. Duckett House	Charles H. Duckett House	November 19, 1986 (#86003151)	105 Downs St. 34°29′46″N 82°01′42″W	Laurens	
7	Duncan's Creek Presbyterian Church	Duncan's Creek Presbyterian Church	November 15, 1973 (#73001714)	5 miles northeast of Clinton, off South Carolina Highway 72; 34°31′18″N 81°48′29″W	Clinton	
8	James Dunklin House	James Dunklin House	October 1, 1974 (#74001861)	544 W. Main St. 34°29′52″N 82°01′24″W	Laurens	
9	Gray Court Downtown Historic District		October 8, 2024 (#100010908)	329-425 W. Main Street; 34°36′27″N 82°06′49″W	Gray Court	
10	Gray Court-Owings School	Gray Court-Owings School	April 21, 2004 (#04000354)	9210 South Carolina Highway 14; 34°37′11″N 82°07′23″W	Gray Court	
11	Dr. William Claudius Irby House	Dr. William Claudius Irby House	November 19, 1986 (#86003152)	132 Irby Ave. 34°29′38″N 82°01′06″W	Laurens	
12	Irby-Henderson-Todd House	Irby-Henderson-Todd House	September 8, 1983 (#83002200)	112 Todd Ave. 34°29′28″N 82°01′52″W	Laurens	
13	Laurens County Courthouse	Laurens County Courthouse	June 19, 1972 (#72001214)	Laurens Courthouse Sq. 34°29′44″N 82°01′00″W	Laurens	
14	Laurens Historic District	Laurens Historic District	October 10, 1980 (#80003675)	U.S. Routes 76 and 221; also both sides of W. Main St. from 742 to 964 W. Main St. 34°29′51″N 82°01′12″W	Laurens	Second set of boundaries represents a boundary increase of November 19, 1986
15	Lindley's Fort Site		November 7, 1978 (#78002521)	Address Restricted	Madens	
16	Nickels-Milam House	Nickels-Milam House	May 28, 1976 (#76001705)	South of Laurens off U.S. Route 221; 34°25′35″N 82°00′18″W	Laurens	
17	Octagon House	Octagon House	March 20, 1973 (#73001715)	619 E. Main St. 34°29′57″N 82°00′05″W	Laurens	
18	Owings Historic District		September 24, 2025 (#100012281)	Portions of N. Old Laurens Rd., SC Hwy 14. Quarry Rd., Friendship Church Rd., Bragg Rd., and Depot Rd. 34°37′53″N 82°08′00″W	Owings	
19	John Calvin Owings House	John Calvin Owings House	February 23, 1978 (#78002520)	787 W. Main St. 34°29′38″N 82°01′43″W	Laurens	Designed by architect George Franklin Barber
20	Rosemont Plantation		June 11, 1993 (#93000459)	Address Restricted	Waterloo	
21	William Dunlap Simpson House	William Dunlap Simpson House	July 24, 1974 (#74001862)	726 W. Main St. 34°29′44″N 82°01′30″W	Laurens	
22	Sitgreaves House	Sitgreaves House	November 19, 1986 (#86003158)	428 W. Farley Ave. 34°29′23″N 82°01′42″W	Laurens	
23	South Harper Historic District	South Harper Historic District	November 19, 1986 (#86003161)	Both sides of S. Harper St. from 320 to 1037; 34°29′31″N 82°00′59″W	Laurens	
24	Sullivan House	Sullivan House	May 22, 1973 (#73001716)	10 miles west of Laurens on U.S. Route 76; 34°30′13″N 82°13′17″W	Laurens	
25	Thornwell-Presbyterian College Historic District	Thornwell-Presbyterian College Historic District	March 5, 1982 (#82003873)	Presbyterian College Campus; 34°27′58″N 81°52′48″W	Clinton	
26	Williams-Ball-Copeland House	Williams-Ball-Copeland House	November 19, 1986 (#86003159)	544 Ball Dr. 34°30′01″N 82°01′30″W	Laurens	
27	Wilson-Clary House	Wilson-Clary House	December 11, 1986 (#86003471)	120 Irby Ave. 34°29′40″N 82°01′06″W	Laurens	

== See also ==
- List of National Historic Landmarks in South Carolina
- National Register of Historic Places listings in South Carolina
