= Battle of Lindley's Fort =

1776 battle in South Carolina

Coordinates: 34.45965°N 82.118268°W

- Part of the American Revolutionary War and the Cherokee–American wars
Date	July 15, 1776
Location	Laurens County, near present-day Laurens, South Carolina
Result	Patriot victory

Belligerents
S. Carolina Patriots	S. Carolina Loyalists; Cherokees

Commanders and leaders
Jonathan Downs	

Strength
150 militia	190 Loyalists and Cherokee warriors

Casualties and losses
	2 killed, 13 captured

The Battle of Lindley's Fort (July 15, 1776) was part of a campaign by Loyalist and Cherokee forces to gain control over the South Carolina backcountry from Patriot forces early in the American Revolutionary War. The Cherokees were involved because ongoing encroachment of their territory in the area had led them to take up arms. These activities prompted settlers to seek refuge at Lindley's Fort in present-day Laurens County. A joint force of Cherokee and Loyalists adorned with Indian warpaint descended on the fort one day after about 150 militiamen arrived at the stockade fort. The defenders repulsed the attackers, and when they withdrew, made a sortie and pursued them. Two Loyalists were killed and 13 taken prisoner.

== Background ==
The American Revolutionary War in the southern of the Thirteen Colonies did not at first involve Native Americans directly. Conflicts between Loyalist and Patriot colonists in the backcountry of South Carolina in late 1775 had resulted in the arrest, flight, or expulsion of most of the prominent Loyalist leaders. A number of Loyalists fled to the nearby Cherokee towns (located in and around present-day western South Carolina in the southern Appalachian Mountains), where they were given refuge.

By early 1776, a delegation of northern Indians had arrived in the Cherokee villages, and convinced the younger generation of warriors to "take up the hatchet" against the colonists. Although the British Indian agent John Stuart tried to keep the Cherokee neutral, he realized that war was inevitable, and sought to channel Cherokee military activities to coordinate with British efforts.

== Battle ==
The Cherokee went on the warpath on July 1, 1776. Henry Laurens wrote that the Cherokee attacked "very suddenly, without any pretense to Provocation those treacherous Devils in various Parties headed by White Men", killing as many as 60 South Carolinians. The timing of this campaign was fortuitous for the Cherokee: a major British force had been anchored off Charleston, South Carolina since early June, but its attack on the city had been repulsed in the June 28 Battle of Sullivan's Island. As a result, Continental Army general Charles Lee was unable to provide any sort of relief.

When the Cherokee attacks began in South Carolina, refugees began fleeing the outlying settlements for frontier fortifications. One of these was Lindley's Fort, a vestige of the Anglo-Cherokee War of the early 1760s that was rehabilitated and strengthened by the refugees. A militia company under Major Jonathan Downs arrived at the fort on July 14, raising the total number of armed defenders to about 150.

The next day a force of about 190 Loyalists and Cherokee arrived. Although they attempted an assault on the fort, its stockade walls were sufficient to withstand their weaponry, which was limited to muskets and Indian weapons such as tomahawks. When the attackers began to abandon the attempt on the fort in favor of easier raiding targets nearby, Major Downs led a sortie from the fort. In a running battle he managed to capture about 10 Loyalists.

== Aftermath ==
The Cherokee raids in the spring and summer of 1776 sparked a major backlash. The Carolinas, Georgia, and Virginia all devoted significant militia resources to campaign against the Cherokee. Between late July and early October 1776, militia forces numbering in the thousands entered Cherokee land, destroying crops and villages. The Cherokee themselves fled before the advance, and ended up taking refuge in lands further west and south.

The site of Lindley's Fort outside Laurens, South Carolina is listed on the National Register of Historic Places.
