= Charlton Hall =

Charlton Hall may refer to:

- Charlton Hall, Northumberland, an English country house
- USS Charlton Hall (ID-1359), a cargo ship named after the English house
- Charlton Hall Plantation House, Laurens County, South Carolina
