= Albright House =

Albright House may refer to:

- Albright House (Fort Madison, Iowa), listed on the National Register of Historic Places in Lee County, Iowa
- Albright-Dukes House, Laurens, South Carolina, listed on the National Register of Historic Places in Laurens County, South Carolina

== See also ==
- Daniel Albright Farm, Marquam, Oregon, listed on the National Register of Historic Places in Clackamas County, Oregon
