= Sitgreaves =

Sitgreaves is a surname. Notable people with the surname include:

- Beverley Sitgreaves (1867–1943), American actress
- John Sitgreaves (1757–1802), American politician and judge
- Lorenzo Sitgreaves, the leader of the Sitgreaves Expedition and namesake of Sitgreaves Pass
- Rosedith Sitgreaves (1915–1992), American statistician
- Samuel Sitgreaves (1764–1827), US Representative from Pennsylvania

== See also ==
- Apache-Sitgreaves National Forest in Arizona and New Mexico
- Sitgreaves Expedition, an exploration of three rivers in the US Southwest in 1851
- Sitgreaves House, a historic home in South Carolina, built in 1907.
- Sitgreaves Pass in the Black Mountains of Arizona
