= W. Paul Culbertson =

American politician (1918–2004)

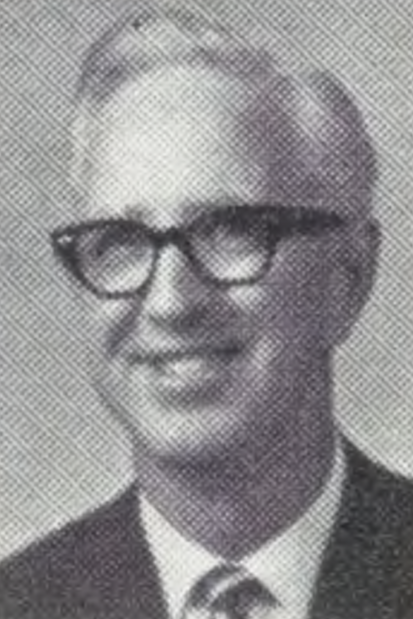
- Culbertson in 1968

Member of the South Carolina House of Representatives from Laurens County
- In office 1957–1958
- In office 1967–1970

Mayor of Laurens, South Carolina
- In office 1958–1964

Personal details
- Born: William Paul Culbertson; November 19, 1918 Waterloo, South Carolina, U.S.
- Died: November 20, 2004 (aged 86) Laurens, South Carolina, U.S.
- Party: Democratic
- Education: University of South Carolina

William Paul Culbertson (November 19, 1918 – November 20, 2004) was an American politician. A member of the Democratic Party, he served in the South Carolina House of Representatives from 1957 to 1958 and again from 1967 to 1970 and as mayor of Laurens, South Carolina from 1958 to 1964.

== Life and career ==
Culbertson was born in Waterloo, South Carolina, the son of Fred Warren Culbertson and Louise Workman. He served in the United States Air Force during World War II, which after his discharge, he attended the University of South Carolina, earning his LLB degree in 1951.

Culbertson served in the South Carolina House of Representatives from 1957 to 1958. After his service in the House, he served as a mayor of Laurens, South Carolina from 1958 to 1964, which after his service as mayor, he served again in the House from 1967 to 1970.

== Death ==
Culbertson died on November 20, 2004, at the Laurens County Hospital in Laurens, South Carolina, at the age of 86.
