= Laurens Historic District =

Historic district in South Carolina, United States

- U.S. National Register of Historic Places
- U.S. Historic district
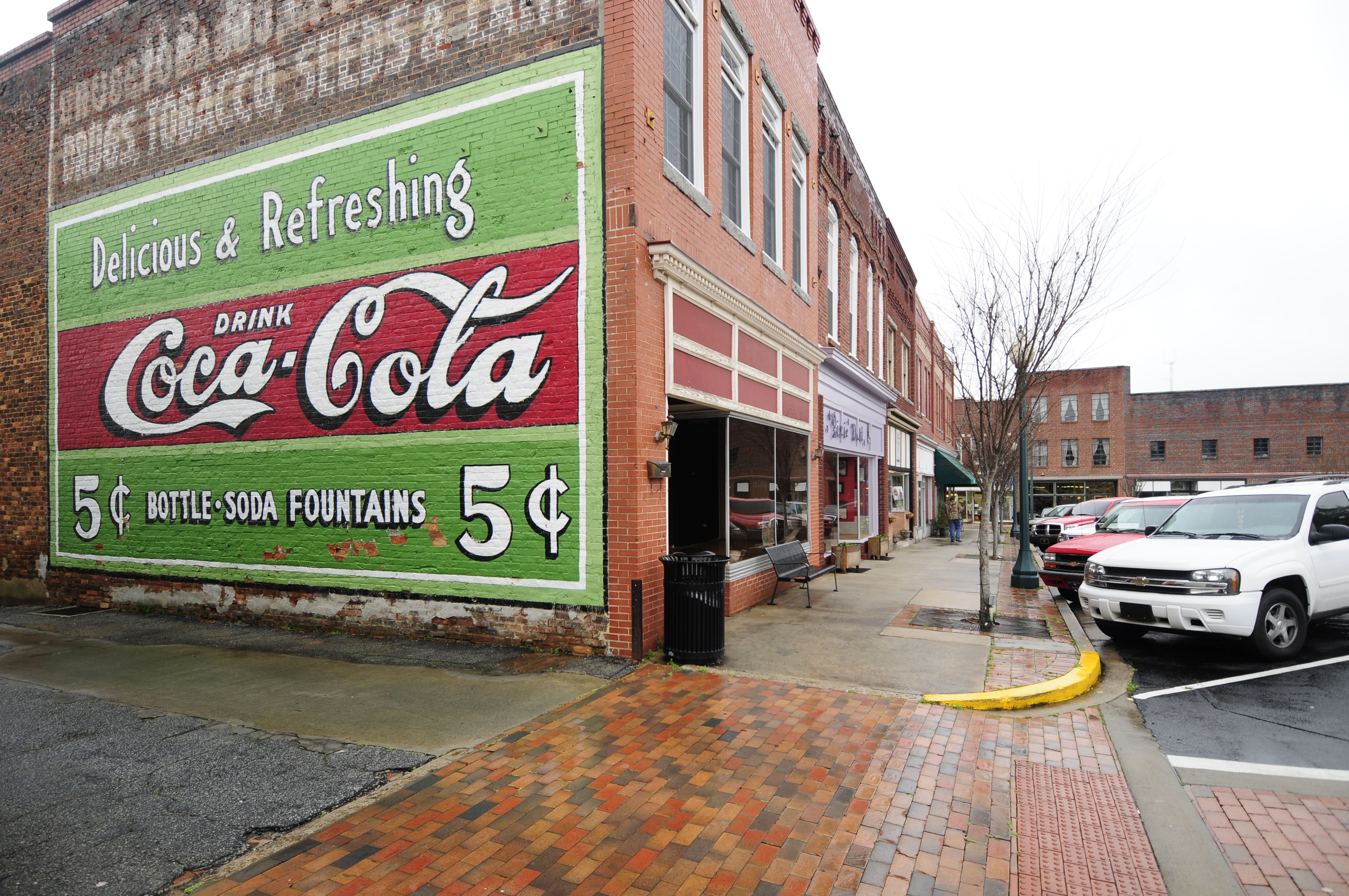

- Location within South Carolina Location within the United States
- Location: U.S. 221 and U.S. 76, Both sides of W. Main St. from 742 to 964 W. Main St., (increase); Laurens, South Carolina
- Coordinates: 34°29′51″N 82°1′12″W
- Area: 85 acres (34 ha); 31.5 acres (12.7 ha) (increase)
- Built: 1874
- Architect: Multiple
- Architectural style: Late 19th And 20th Century Revivals, Greek Revival, Late Victorian
- NRHP reference No.: 80003675 (original); 86003164 (increase)

Significant dates
- Added to NRHP: October 10, 1980
- Boundary increase: November 19, 1986

Laurens Historic District is a national historic district located at Laurens, Laurens County, South Carolina. It encompasses 77 contributing buildings and 1 contributing structure in Laurens. The district includes residential, commercial, religious, and governmental buildings built between 1880 and 1940. Notable buildings include the Laurens County Courthouse, Old Methodist Church, St. Paul First Baptist Church, Public Square commercial buildings, Rosenblum's and Maxwell Bros. and Kinard Store, Provident Finance Co. and Parker Furniture, McDonald House, Augustus Huff House, Gov. William Dunlap Simpson House, and Hudgens-Harney House.

It was listed on the National Register of Historic Places (NRHP) in 1980 and extended in 1986.

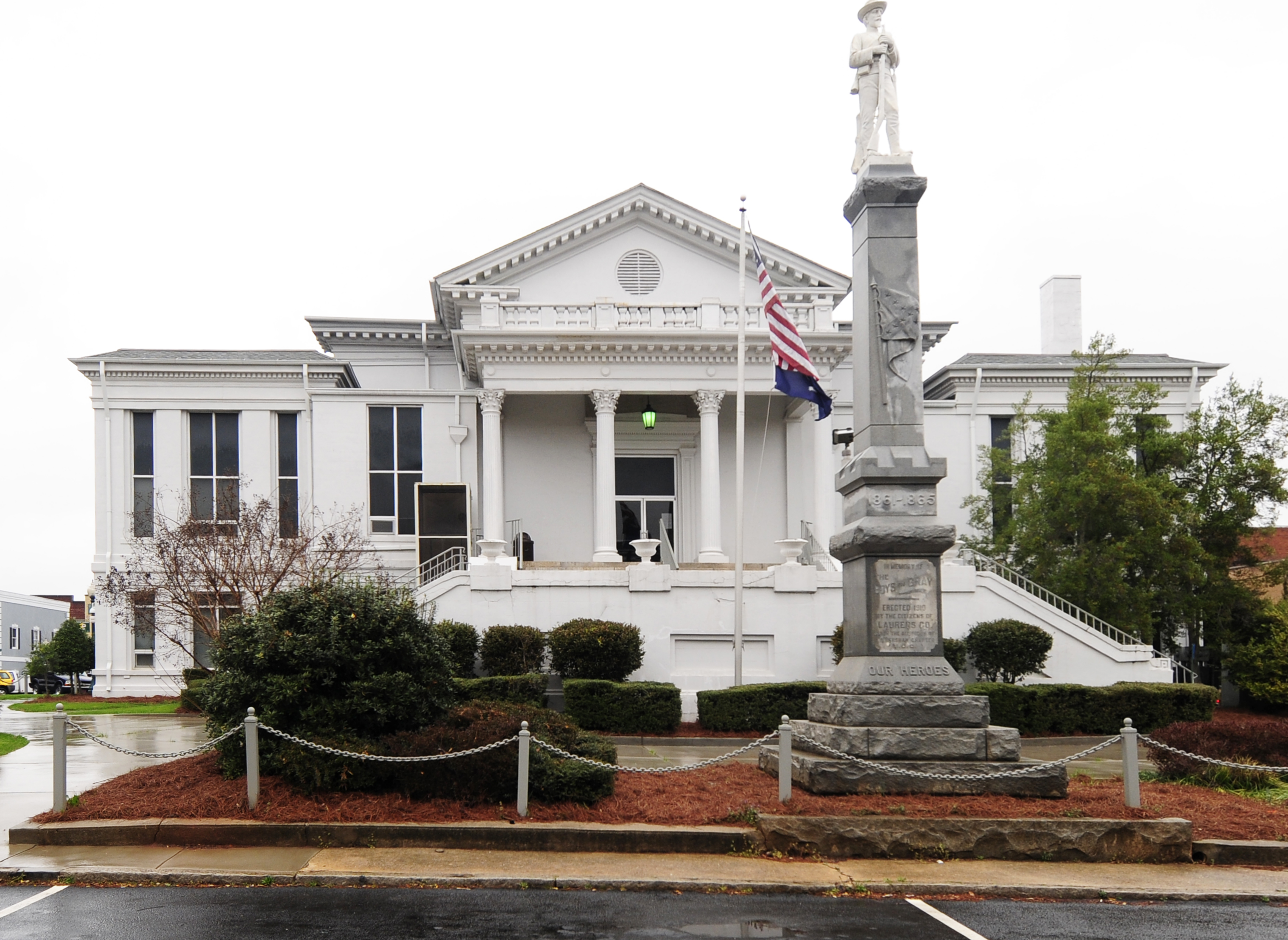
Laurens County Courthouse

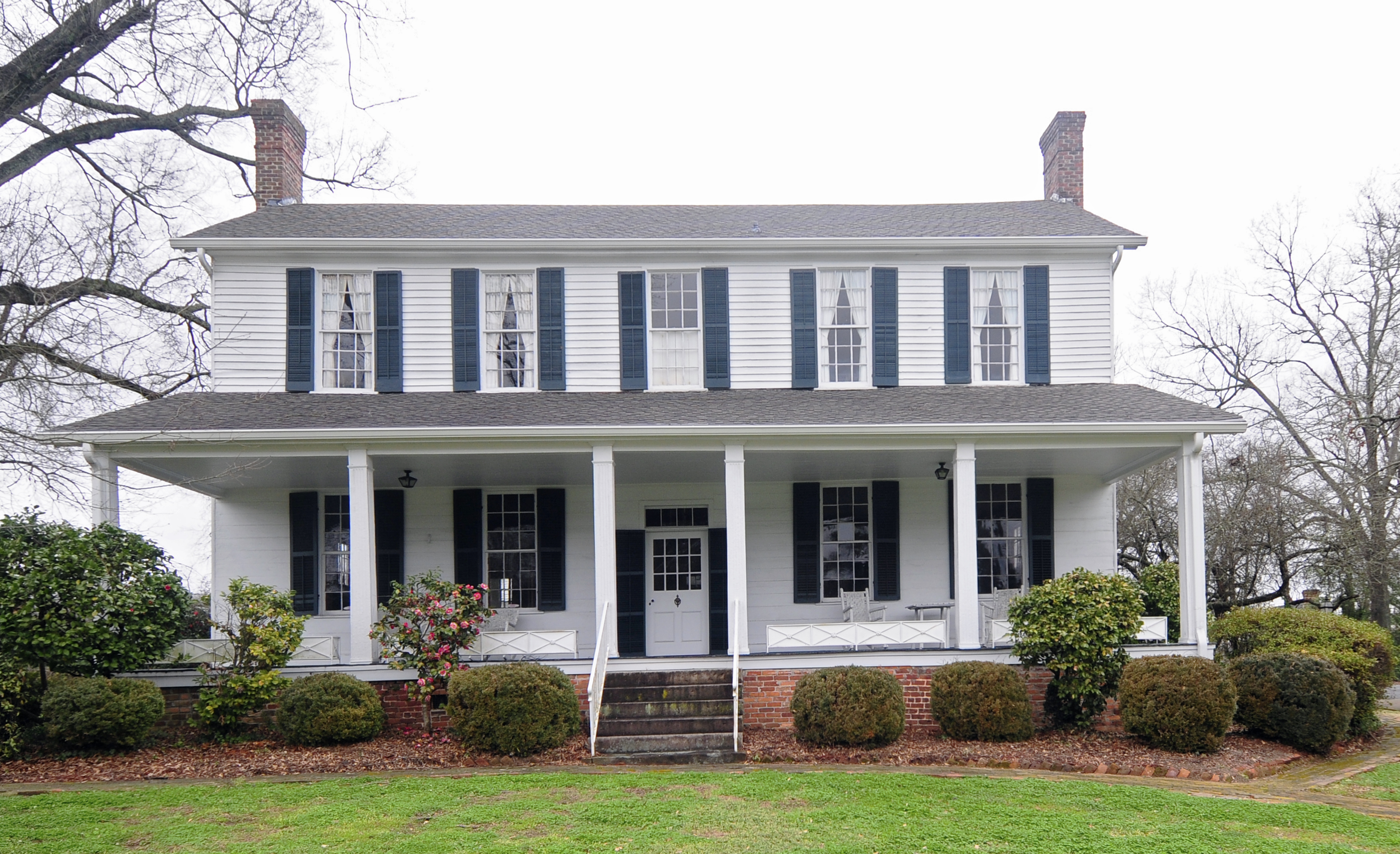
James Dunklin House

It includes the Laurens County Courthouse, the James Dunklin House, William Dunlap Simpson House, and other properties that are separately NRHP-listed.

== See also ==
- National Register of Historic Places listings in Laurens County, South Carolina
