= Dr. William Claudius Irby House =

Historic house in South Carolina, United States

- U.S. National Register of Historic Places
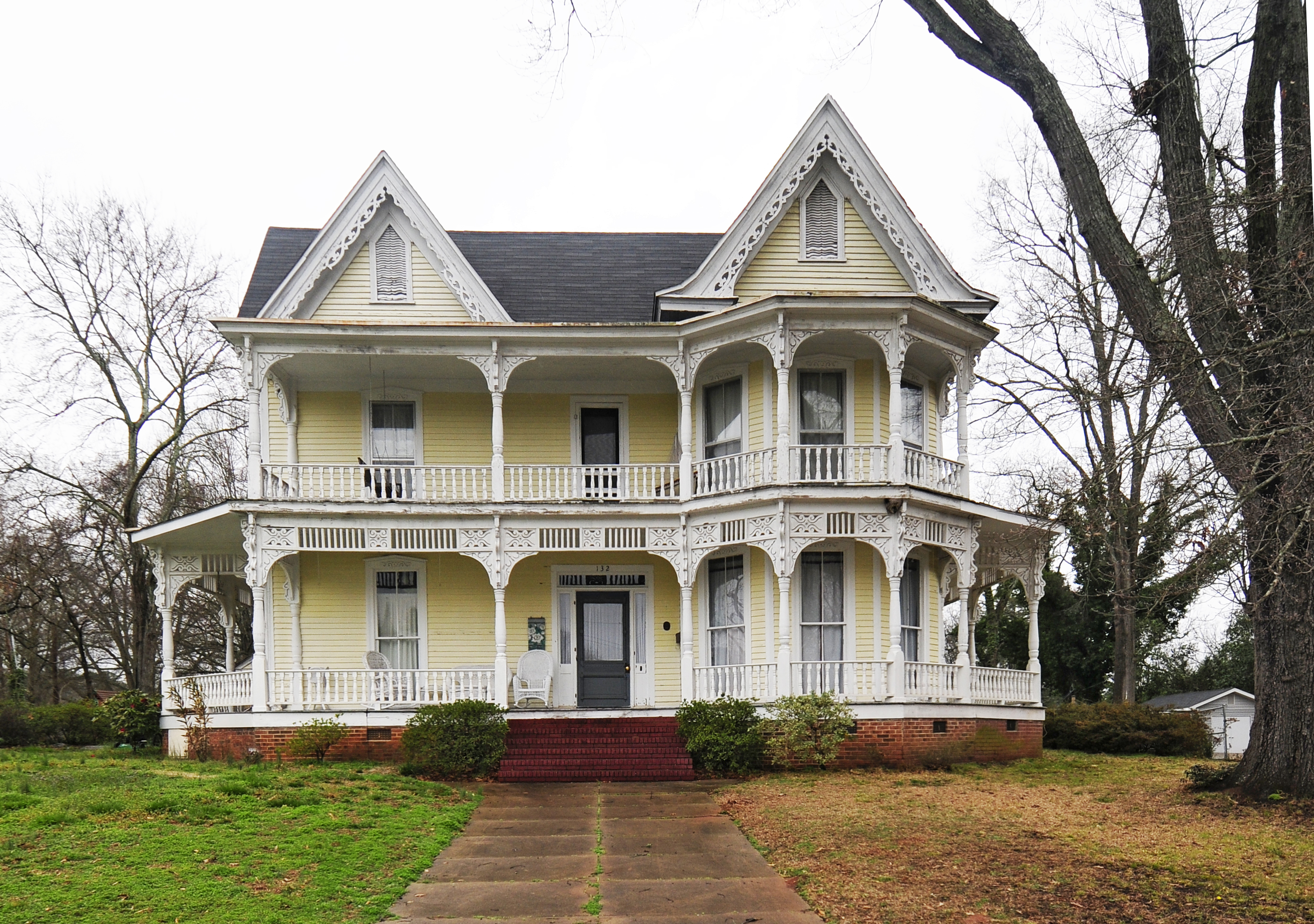
- Dr. William Claudius Irby, February 2012

- Location within South Carolina Location within the United States
- Location: 132 Irby Ave., Laurens, South Carolina
- Coordinates: 34°29′38″N 82°1′6″W
- Area: 1 acre (0.40 ha)
- Built: c. 1890
- Architectural style: Stick/eastlake
- MPS: City of Laurens MRA
- NRHP reference No.: 86003152
- Added to NRHP: November 19, 1986

Dr. William Claudius Irby House, also known as the Crowe House, is a historic home located in Laurens, South Carolina.

== Background ==
The Dr. William Claudius Irby House was built about 1890, and is a two-story, frame residence sheathed in weatherboarding with a cross-gable roof with Eastlake style elements. It features include a two-tiered porch on the façade and a single-story porches on the side elevations. Also on the property is a fieldstone outbuilding.

It was added to the National Register of Historic Places in 1986.
