= Laurens County Courthouse =

- U.S. National Register of Historic Places
- U.S. Historic district – Contributing property
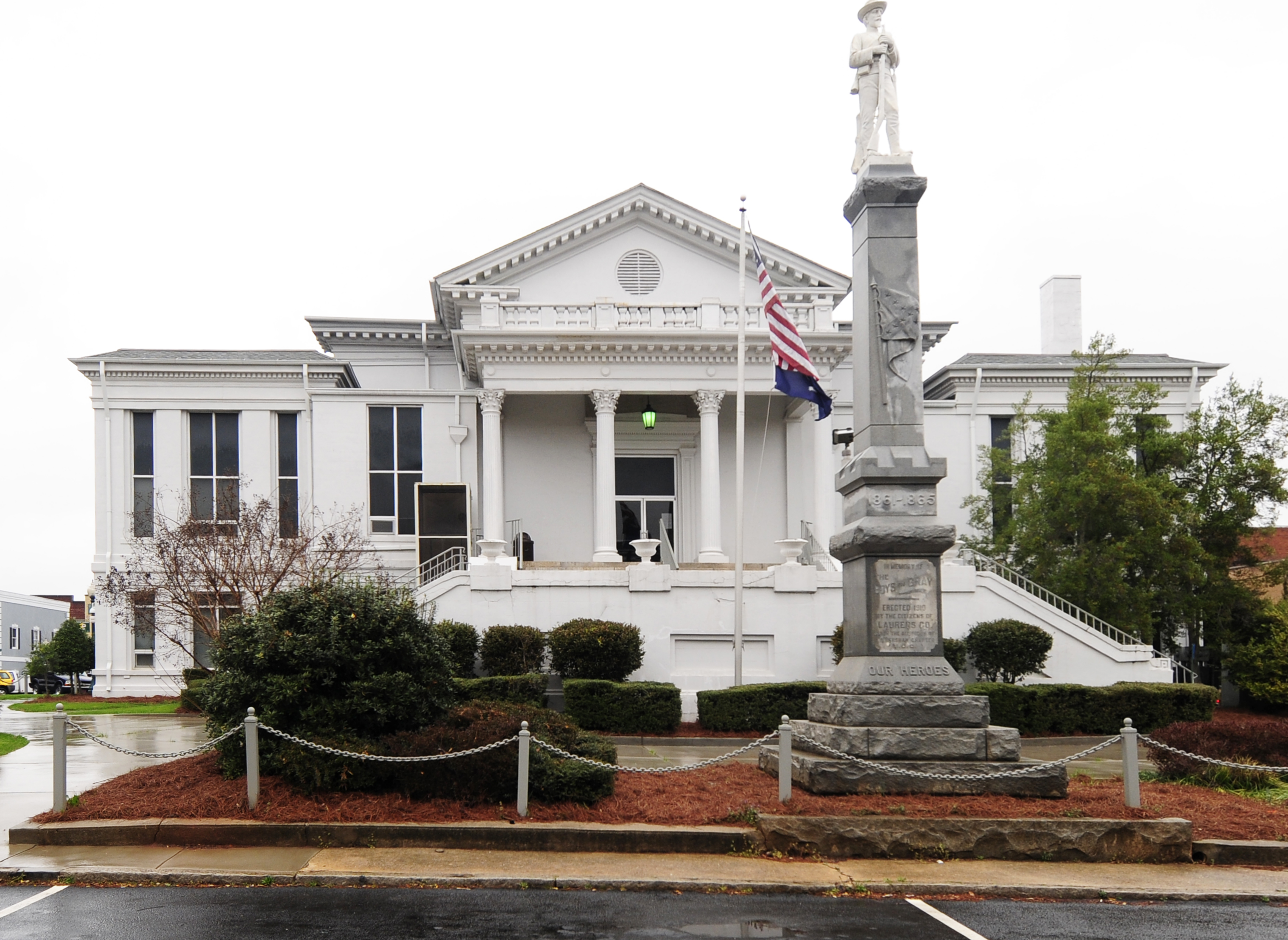
- Laurens County Courthouse, February 2012

- Location within South Carolina Location within the United States
- Location: Laurens Courthouse Sq., Laurens, South Carolina
- Coordinates: 34°29′57″N 82°00′52″W
- Area: 1 acre (0.40 ha)
- Built: c. 1837-1838, c. 1858, 1911
- Built by: Veal, Thomas C.; Wells, Dr. John
- Architectural style: Greek Revival
- NRHP reference No.: 72001214
- Added to NRHP: June 19, 1972

Laurens County Courthouse is a historic courthouse located at Laurens, Laurens County, South Carolina.

== History ==
It was constructed in 1837–1838, and is a granite ashlar and brick Greek Revival style building. The original projecting porticoes in the front and rear have four Corinthian order columns and two simple pilasters. Wings were added in 1858, and in 1911 further additions were made to the wings, the windows remodeled, and the Palladian stairways added. At this time the low elliptical dome was constructed.

It was added to the National Register of Historic Places in 1972. It is located in the Laurens Historic District.

== Gallery ==
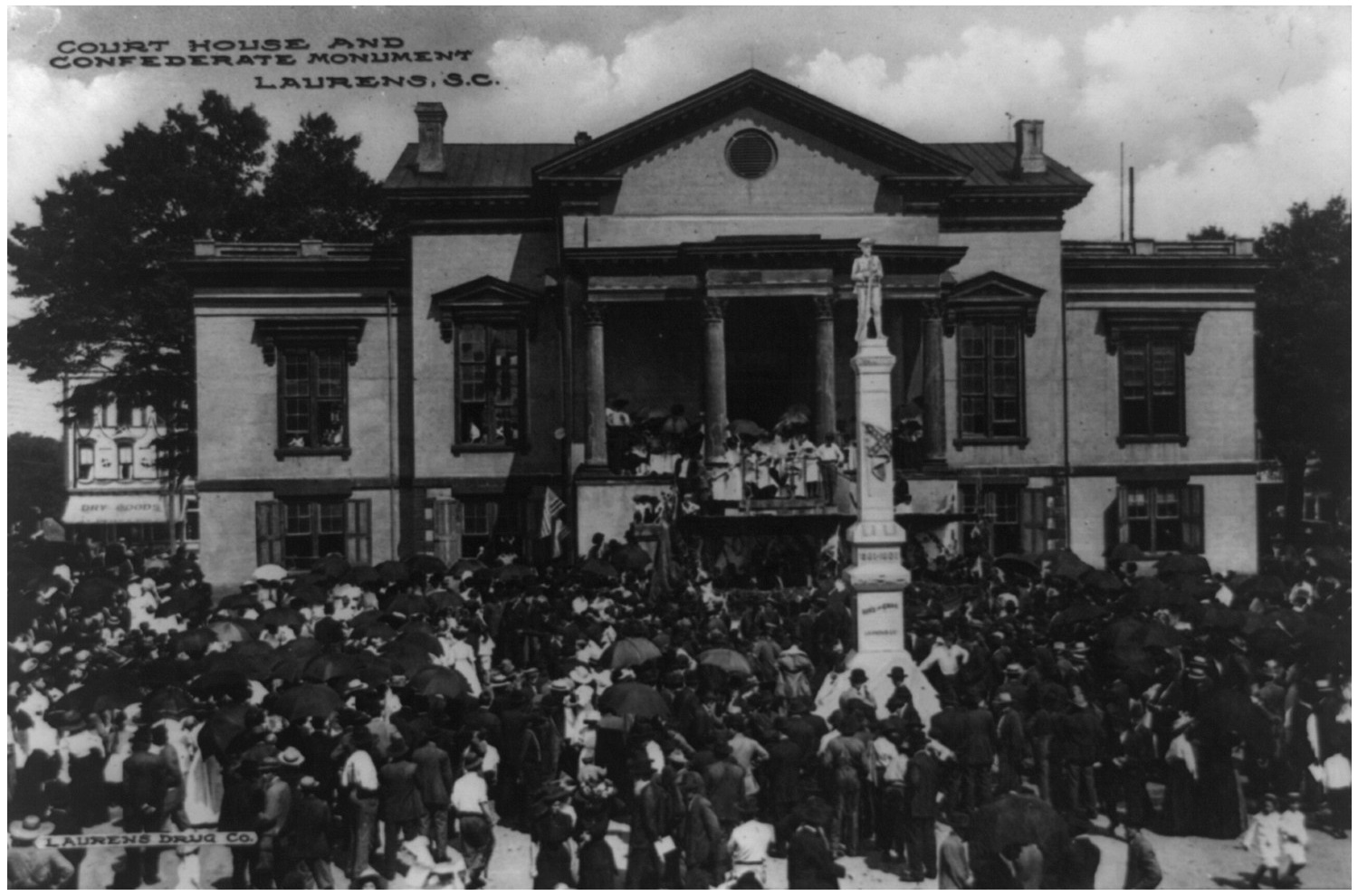
Circa 1910
