= Lyde Irby Darlington House =

Historic house in South Carolina, United States

- U.S. National Register of Historic Places
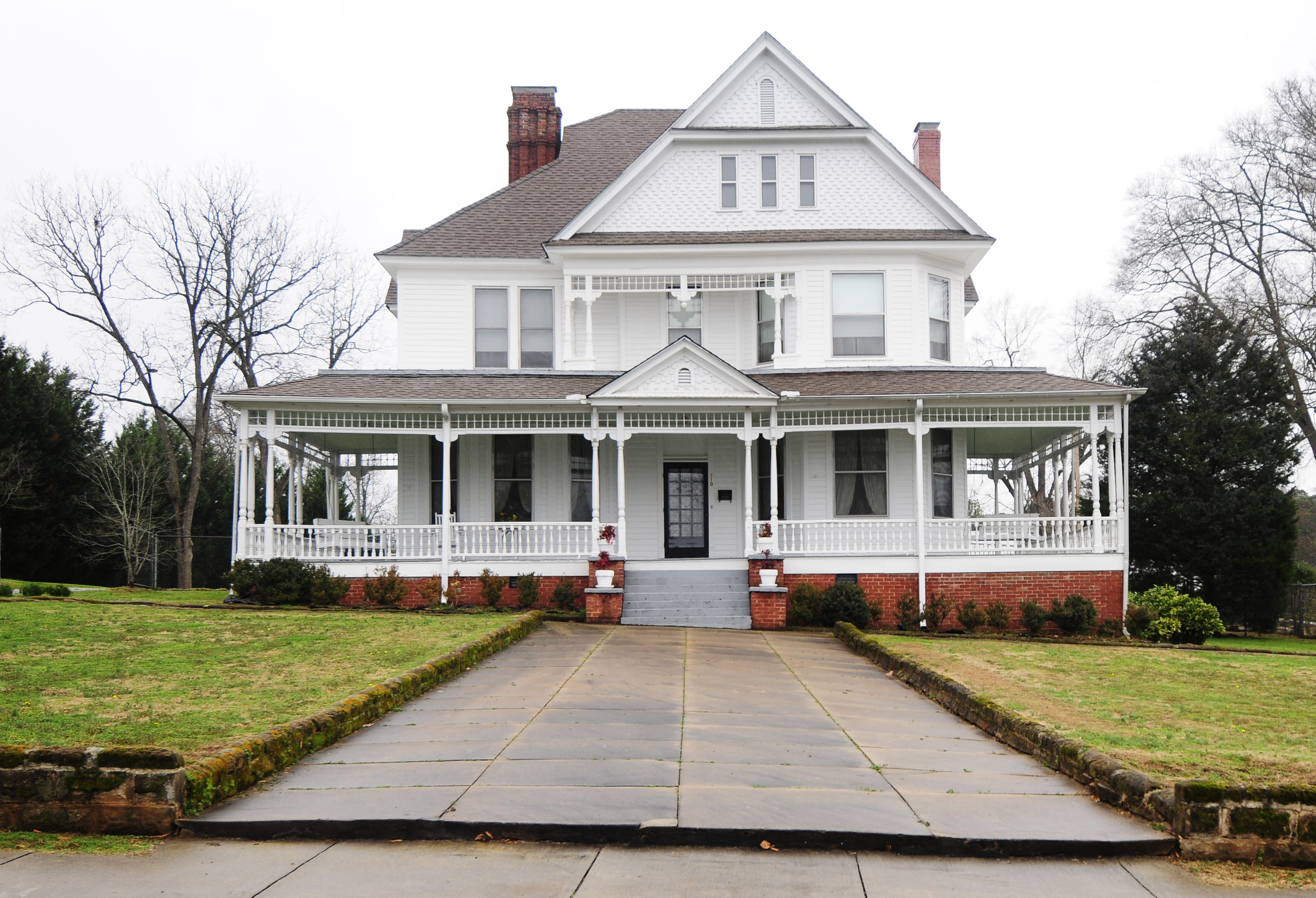
- Lyde Irby Darlington House, February 2012

- Location within South Carolina Location within the United States
- Location: 110 Irby Ave., Laurens, South Carolina
- Coordinates: 34°29′41″N 82°1′5″W
- Area: 1 acre (0.40 ha)
- Built: 1899
- Architectural style: Classical Revival, Late Victorian, Eclectic
- MPS: City of Laurens MRA
- NRHP reference No.: 86003150
- Added to NRHP: November 19, 1986

Lyde Irby Darlington House, also known as the Monroe House, is a historic home located at Laurens, Laurens County, South Carolina. It was built about 1899, and is a two-story, eclectic frame dwelling with elements of the Queen Anne, Eastlake, and Classical Revival styles. Notable features include polygonal bays and a wraparound porch.

It was added to the National Register of Historic Places in 1986.
