= James Dunklin House =

Historic house in South Carolina, United States

- U.S. National Register of Historic Places
- U.S. Historic district – Contributing property
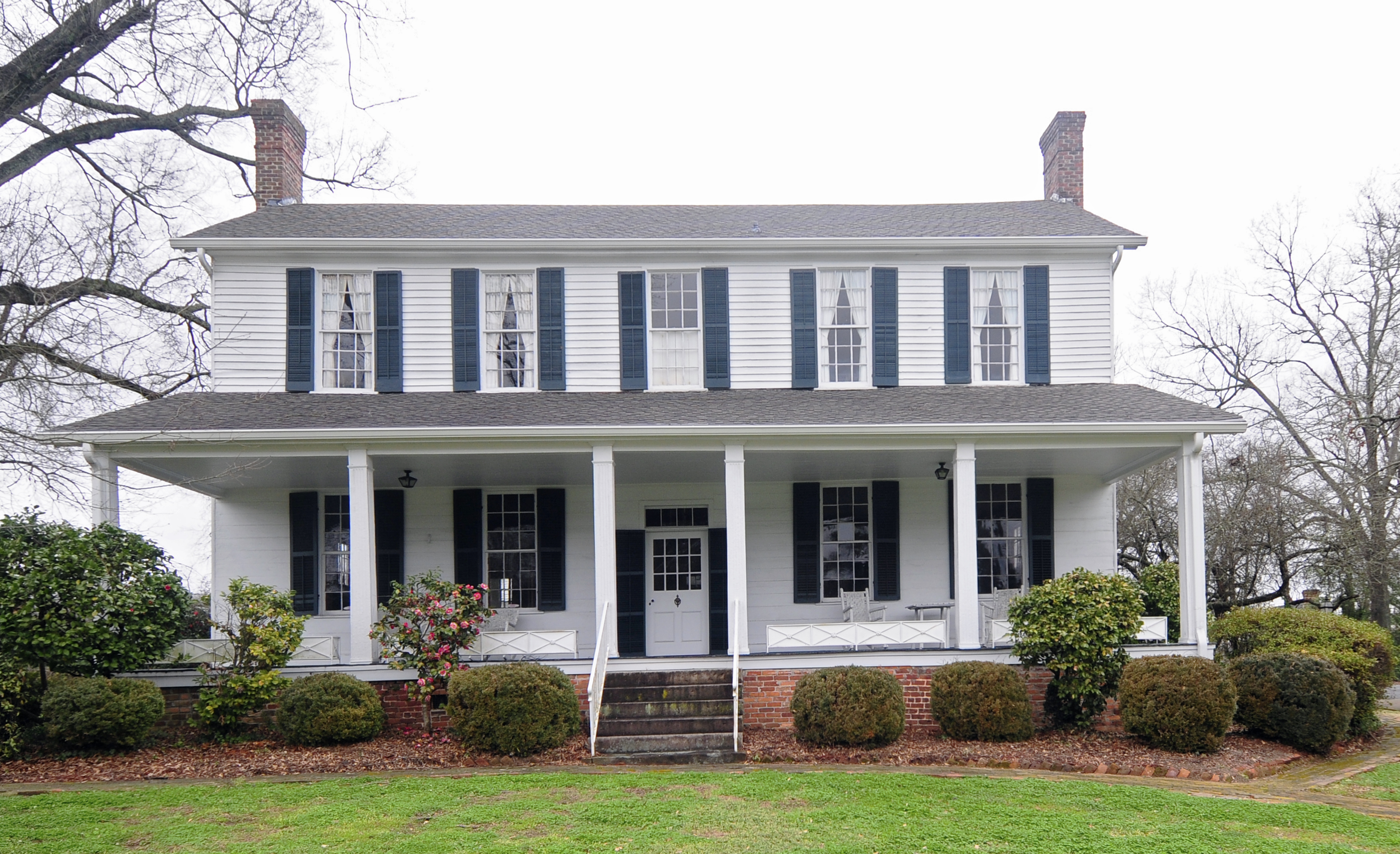
- James Dunklin House, February 2012

- Location within South Carolina Location within the United States
- Location: 544 W. Main St., Laurens, South Carolina
- Coordinates: 34°29′52″N 82°1′24″W
- Area: 2 acres (0.81 ha)
- Built: c. 1812
- Architectural style: S.C. upcountry farmhouse
- NRHP reference No.: 74001861
- Added to NRHP: October 1, 1974

James Dunklin House, also known as the Williams-Watts-Todd-Dunklin House, is a historic home located in Laurens, Laurens County, South Carolina. It was built about 1812, and is a two-story, five-bay, upcountry farmhouse, or I-house. It features informally spaced columns and two pipe-stem chimneys. An 1845 wing was removed in 1950 and converted into a six-room apartment building located behind the main house. At this time a first-floor sun porch was added to the rear of the house. Also on the property are outbuildings including a renovated slave cabin, a garage apartment, and a reconstruction of a kitchen at Colonial Williamsburg.

It was added to the National Register of Historic Places in 1974. It is located in the Laurens Historic District.
