= Wilson-Clary House =

Historic house in South Carolina, United States

- U.S. National Register of Historic Places
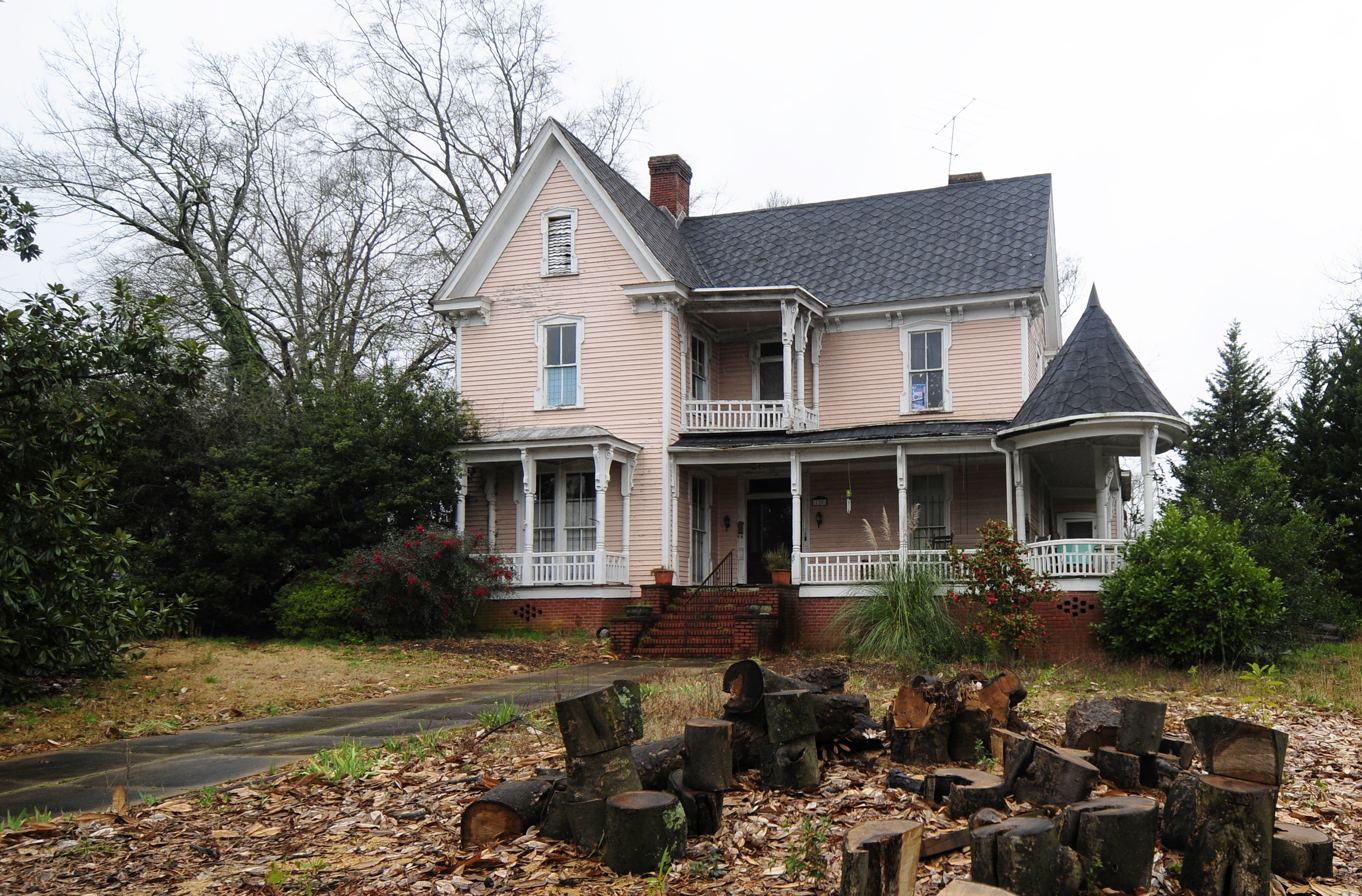
- Wilson-Clary House, 2012

- Location within South Carolina Location within the United States
- Location: 120 Irby Ave., Laurens, South Carolina
- Coordinates: 34.494479°N 82.018189°W
- Area: 1 acre (0.40 ha)
- Built: 1892
- MPS: City of Laurens MRA
- NRHP reference No.: 86003471
- Added to NRHP: December 11, 1986

The Wilson-Clary House, also known as the Crisp House, is a historic home located at Laurens, Laurens County, South Carolina. The vernacular Victorian style house with Eastlake influences was constructed ca1892 for J. J. Wilson Jr and Toccoa Irby Wilson.

The two-story frame house has two brick chimneys above a cross-gable roof. It has a single-story wraparound porch with a tent roof gazebo at its vertex and pedimented window surrounds. The interior features ceiling medallions, a marble mantel and an elaborate staircase.

It was listed on the National Register of Historic Places in 1986.
