= Sullivan House (Laurens, South Carolina) =

Historic house in South Carolina, United States

- U.S. National Register of Historic Places
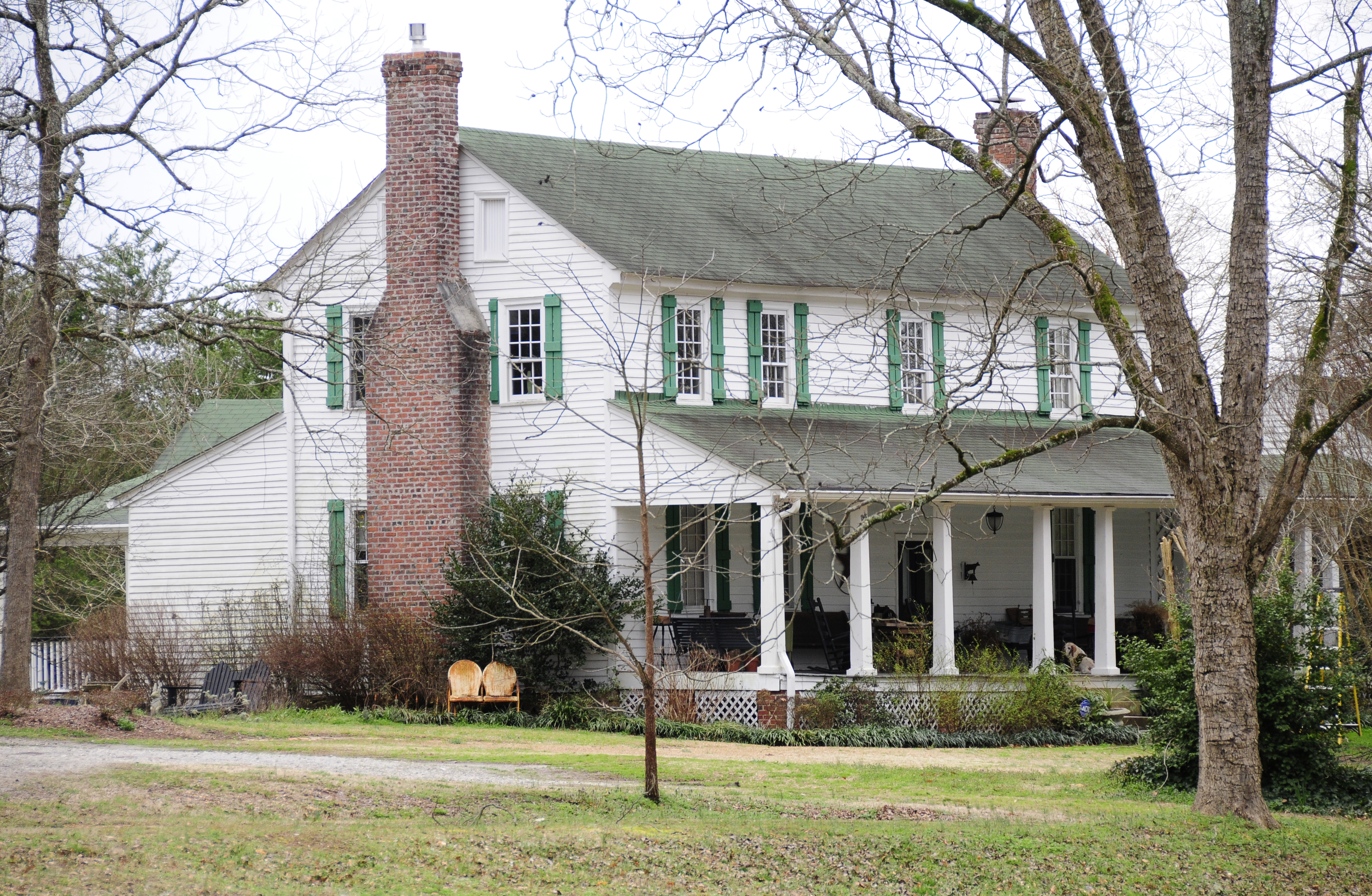
- Sullivan House, February 1972

- Location within South Carolina Location within the United States
- Nearest city: 10 miles west of Laurens on U.S. Route 76, near Laurens, South Carolina
- Coordinates: 34°30′13″N 82°13′17″W
- Area: 1.5 acres (0.61 ha)
- Built: c. 1838
- Architectural style: I house
- NRHP reference No.: 73001716
- Added to NRHP: May 22, 1973

Sullivan House, also known as Tumbling Shoals, is a historic home located near Laurens, Laurens County, South Carolina. It was built about 1838, and is a two-story, frame I-house dwelling, two rooms in length, and one room deep, with a side-gabled roof. The house typifies the first post-pioneer permanent settlement in the lower Carolina Piedmont.

It was added to the National Register of Historic Places in 1973.
