= Laurens, South Carolina =

- City
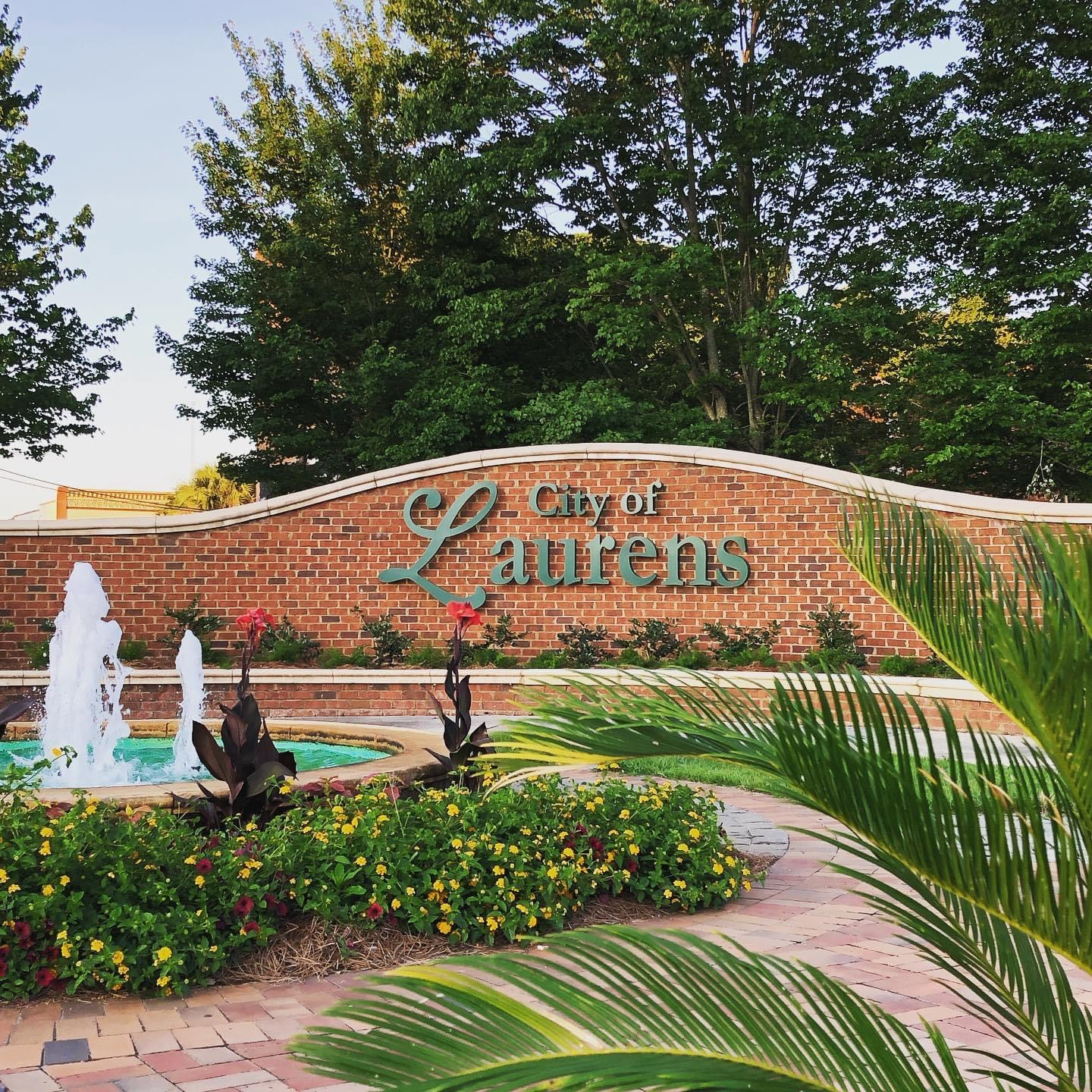
- Gateway Park

- Seal
- Motto: "Gateway to the Upstate"
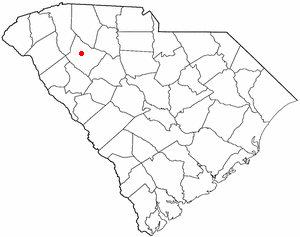
- Location of Laurens in South Carolina
- Coordinates: 34°29′53″N 82°01′12″W
- Country: United States
- State: South Carolina
- County: Laurens
- Named for: Henry Laurens

Area
  - City: 9.84 sq mi (25.49 km^{2})
  - Land: 9.84 sq mi (25.49 km^{2})
  - Water: 0 sq mi (0.00 km^{2})
- Elevation: 587 ft (179 m)

Population (2020)
  - City: 9,335
  - Density: 948.5/sq mi (366.22/km^{2})
  - Metro: 66,537 (Laurens County)
- Time zone: UTC−5 (EST)
  - Summer (DST): UTC−4 (EDT)
- ZIP code: 29360
- Area codes: 864, 821
- FIPS code: 45-40615
- GNIS feature ID: 2404891
- Website: cityoflaurenssc.com

Laurens is a city in Laurens County, South Carolina, United States. As of the 2020 census, Laurens had a population of 9,335. It is the county seat of Laurens County. It is part of the Greenville-Mauldin-Easley metropolitan area.

== History ==
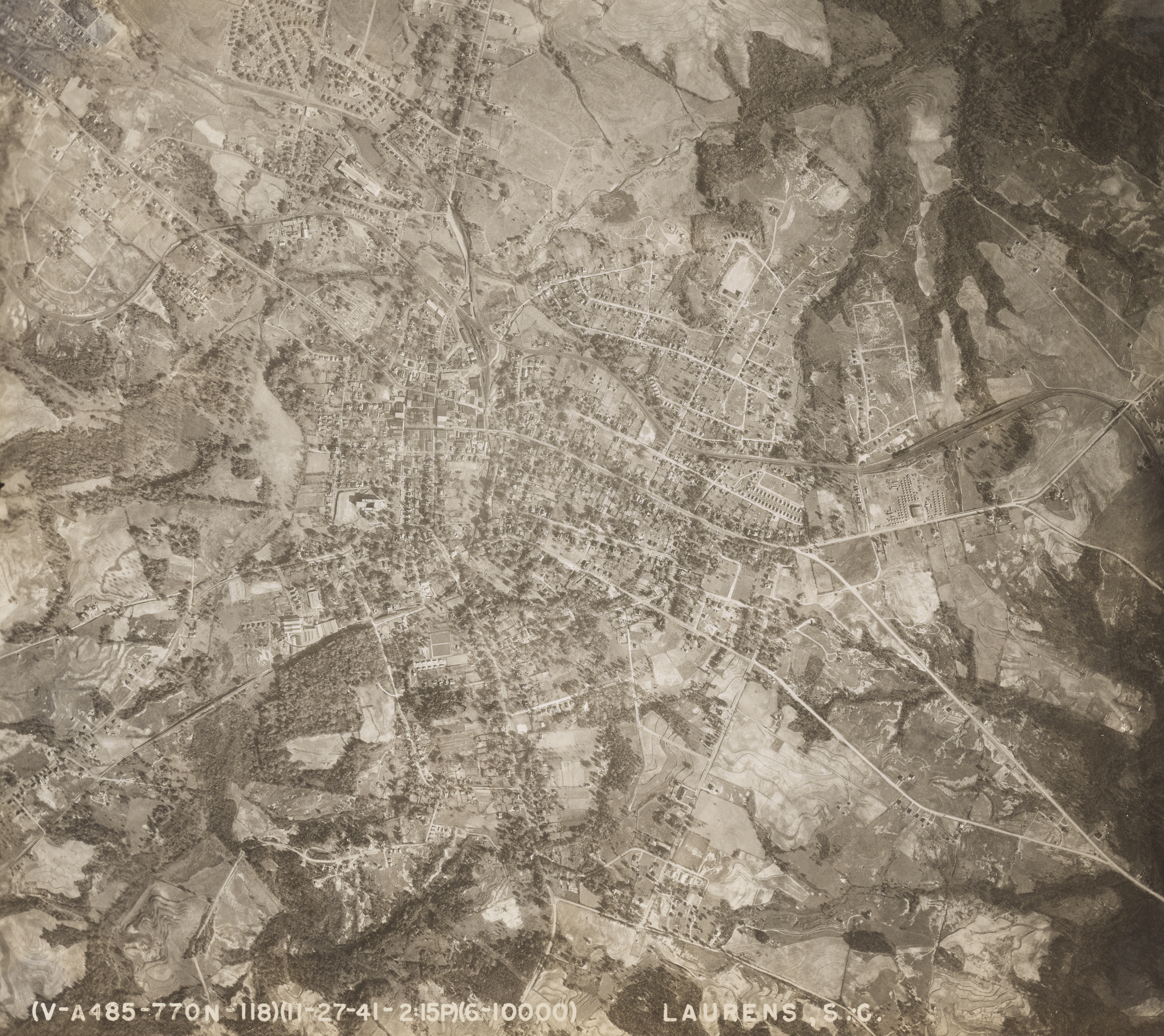
Laurens in 1941

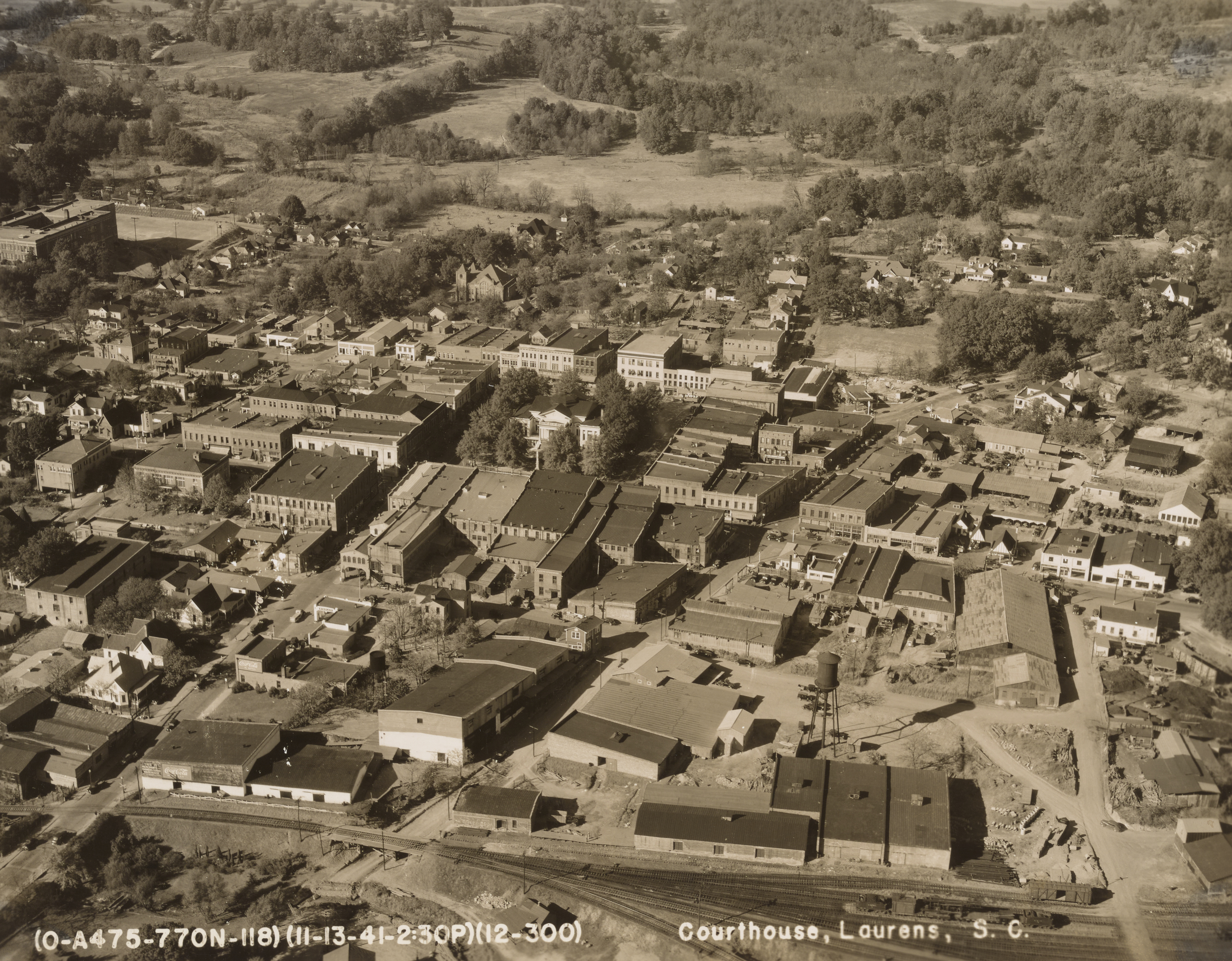
Downtown Laurens, 1941

Located in upstate South Carolina, the city of Laurens is named after Henry Laurens, a South Carolina merchant and rice planter who was one of America's wealthiest slave traders. He was a delegate to and second president of the Continental Congress and served as a diplomat.

Laurens was established by an act of the General Assembly on March 15, 1785, as a location for commercial activities. It was one of the six counties created from the Old Ninety-Six District of South Carolina. Laurens was originally named Laurensville. On December 15, 1845, a charter was issued with the name of Laurensville. The first appearance of the town name Laurens was in an 1873 charter. The town of Laurens was chartered in 1900 and in 1916. It was named in honor of South Carolina statesman Henry Laurens.

The first inhabitants of Laurens were the Cherokee Indians. They used the land as their hunting and fighting ground. There has been evidence of broken potsherds, weapons, and a mound found linked to Cherokee culture on land now called Laurens. Many treaties were made with the Cherokee over the land known as Laurens County dating to 1721. Before the American Revolution, thousands of immigrants, mainly from Scotland and Ireland, settled in Laurens County. Later Laurens developed into a major intersection of commerce in colonial America. In the Battle of Musgrove Mill, Laurens witnessed intense fighting.

In 1790, after the Revolutionary War, Laurens was elected as the county seat. Like other southern towns, cotton was its major crop. High cotton production led to an economic boom and a substantial increase in the African American population due to the use of African slaves on cotton plantations. This attracted wealthy entrepreneurs and businessmen to Laurens. Future President Andrew Johnson worked as a tailor in downtown Laurens from 1824 to 1826.

Before the beginning of the American Civil War, Laurens provided a great deal of political leaders to the state government. The state's decision to secede from the Union was influenced by many of them. The fighting of the Civil War never neared Laurens, but it was affected by the influx of refugees fleeing Charleston to avoid the progressing Union Army and Navy. Several of the refugees settled in Laurens after the war.

In the postwar Reconstruction years, Laurens's economy evolved to include industry. The economic recovery relied upon the creation of the textiles and manufacturing industries. Lauren Cotton Mill was founded in 1895 and Watts Mill in 1902. Laurens Glass Company was established in 1910, and was one of the largest glass plants in the southeast for over 80 years. The Laurens Railroad Company was chartered in 1847. The Columbia-Newberry-Laurens Railroad and the Charleston-Western Carolina Railroad are the two major intersections provided by the railroad.

Laurens and Laurens County is part of the Old 96 District, which also includes Abbeville County, Greenwood County, McCormick County, and Edgefield County.

The textile, manufacturing, and glass industries were at one point a major source of employment. Although many of the textile plants and the glass production facilities have closed over the last 30 years, a variety of industries exist within the county, including corporations like CeramTec, International Paper, Milliken & Company and others. Walmart operates a distribution center outside the city near Interstate 385, which is a major employer. The area has seen several recent economic retail developments, and is seeing new capital investment in heavy industry, including a major new transmission production facility for German ZF Group. The unemployment rate as of February 2012 was 9.6%.

Laurens was the town chosen for a makeover in the second season of Town Haul.

The movie Burden (2018 film) was set in the town of Laurens.

Laurens is home to Reverend Gary Davis and Pink Anderson, acoustic blues musicians who were born in the city, as well as Redtop Davis, a lightweight boxer of the 1940s and 1950s. James "JT" Taylor, the lead singer of the funk/R&B band Kool & The Gang, grew up in Laurens.

== Historic places ==
The Courthouse Square consists of four acres that was purchased in 1792 for two guineas, which is around $21,000 (Bolick, 1982). The Laurens County Courthouse is placed in the center of the square. The current courthouse is the third courthouse. The first courthouse was constructed of wood. It was used as a church, school, and courthouse. The second courthouse was made of brick. Dr. John Wells Simpson built the third courthouse in 1838. The courthouse is listed on the National Register of Historic Places.

Laurens’ church district has two historic churches, which are located on Caroline Street. Bethel AME Church (torn down in the mid-2010s) is one of the historic churches in the district. Columbus White, a former slave and builder, designed the church in 1910. But the first church structure was built in 1868. In 1877, Saint Paul First Baptist, which neighbors Bethel AME Church, was established. Columbus White also built Saint Paul First Baptist in 1912. The church is styled in Gothic Revival and was the county's first African American public school until 1937.

The Church of the Epiphany is Lauren's oldest church building still operating. The church was constructed in 1846. The First United Methodist Church represents Romanesque Revival architecture. The church was built in 1897. In 1834, the First Baptist Church was originally built. The name of the original church was Laurensville Baptist Church. In 1850, the first sanctuary was built. In 1893, the second church was constructed. The present sanctuary was built in 1958. The First Presbyterian Church was organized on April 1, 1832, but the present church structure was built in 1891. The first preacher of the church was Samuel B. Lewers. He served the church for eighteen years. The church is built in the style of Victorian Gothic Revival architecture.

The West Main Street District is where most of the historical houses are located. The Watts-Todd-Dunklin House was built in 1812. Washington Williams built the house as a wedding gift for his daughter, Nancy. His daughter married James Watts. In 1843, Nancy sold the property to Samuel Todd. The Todd family has owned the house for about one hundred years. The house is registered on the National Register of Historic Places.

In 1859, Colonel John Drayton Williams built the Williams-Ball-Copeland House, an Italian Villa architectural design. Several families owned it before the South Carolina Baptist Ministries for the Aging bought it in 1970.

The Governor Simpson House was originally built by one of the first families of Laurens, Christopher Garlington, in 1839. The style of the house is Greek Revival. Major Adam Eichelberger bought the home from the Garlington family. Several years later, Major Adam Eichelberger sold the house to W.D. Simpson, the former South Carolina Governor.

Also on the National Register of Historic Places is the Charles H. Duckett House, located off of West Main Street since 1892. Its owner, Charles Duckett, was a freedman who owned a lumberyard and prayed at the Bethel AME Church. In 1896, George F. Barber designed the John Calvin Owings House, characterized by its gingerbread details and turrets. The Edna Poole House is also located on West Main Street, designed in the Art Deco style and featured in Home Magazine and at the World's Fair in Chicago.

The Octagon House is one of the two octagonal buildings in South Carolina. Between 1850 and 1859, Reverend Zelotes Lee Holmes built the house. The design and architecture are accredited to the brother of the builder who was an engineer. Reverend Zelotes Lee Holmes was a Presbyterian minister and educator in Laurens. The Octagon House, A Home for All by Orson Fowler was published in 1853 was based upon the construction of the house. The house was sold to the Holmes family after the death of Reverend Holmes in 1885.

Other listings on the National Register of Historic Places are the Albright-Dukes House, Lyde Irby Darlington House, Allen Dial House, Charles H. Duckett House, Dr. William Claudius Irby House, Irby-Henderson-Todd House, Laurens Historic District, Nickels-Milam House, Sitgreaves House, South Harper Historic District, Sullivan House, and Wilson-Clary House.

== Geography and climate ==
According to the United States Census Bureau, the city has a total area of 10.6 square miles (27 km^{2}), all land.

Climate data for Laurens, South Carolina, normals 1981–2010, extremes 1901-present
Month	Jan	Feb	Mar	Apr	May	Jun	Jul	Aug	Sep	Oct	Nov	Dec	Year
Record high °F (°C)	81 (27)	82 (28)	93 (34)	95 (35)	102 (39)	107 (42)	107 (42)	107 (42)	107 (42)	98 (37)	88 (31)	83 (28)	107 (42)
Mean daily maximum °F (°C)	51.8 (11.0)	57.1 (13.9)	65.6 (18.7)	74.5 (23.6)	81.9 (27.7)	88.6 (31.4)	91.0 (32.8)	89.7 (32.1)	84.3 (29.1)	74.6 (23.7)	64.2 (17.9)	55.5 (13.1)	73.2 (22.9)
Mean daily minimum °F (°C)	28.5 (−1.9)	32.3 (0.2)	39.1 (3.9)	47.3 (8.5)	56.3 (13.5)	64.8 (18.2)	68.2 (20.1)	67.2 (19.6)	60.8 (16.0)	48.2 (9.0)	38.0 (3.3)	32.0 (0.0)	48.6 (9.2)
Record low °F (°C)	−2 (−19)	3 (−16)	6 (−14)	23 (−5)	31 (−1)	42 (6)	50 (10)	49 (9)	26 (−3)	21 (−6)	12 (−11)	−1 (−18)	−2 (−19)
Average precipitation inches (mm)	4.20 (107)	4.26 (108)	4.54 (115)	3.48 (88)	3.57 (91)	4.09 (104)	4.31 (109)	4.05 (103)	3.72 (94)	3.12 (79)	3.20 (81)	4.15 (105)	44.18 (1,122)
Average snowfall inches (cm)	0.7 (1.8)	0.8 (2.0)	0.5 (1.3)	—	0 (0)	0 (0)	0 (0)	0 (0)	0 (0)	—	0.1 (0.25)	0.4 (1.0)	2.3 (5.8)
Source: NOAA

== Demographics ==
Historical population
Census	Pop.	Note	%±
1860	429		—
1880	752		—
1890	2,245		198.5%
1900	4,029		79.5%
1910	4,818		19.6%
1920	4,629		−3.9%
1930	5,443		17.6%
1940	6,895		26.7%
1950	8,658		25.6%
1960	9,598		10.9%
1970	10,298		7.3%
1980	10,587		2.8%
1990	9,694		−8.4%
2000	9,916		2.3%
2010	9,139		−7.8%
2020	9,335		2.1%
U.S. Decennial Census

=== 2020 census ===
As of the 2020 census, Laurens had a population of 9,335, 3,890 households, and 2,450 families. The median age was 40.3 years. 23.8% of residents were under the age of 18 and 21.4% of residents were 65 years of age or older. For every 100 females there were 83.4 males, and for every 100 females age 18 and over there were 77.5 males age 18 and over.

There were 3,890 households in Laurens, of which 30.6% had children under the age of 18 living in them. Of all households, 32.1% were married-couple households, 18.9% were households with a male householder and no spouse or partner present, and 41.8% were households with a female householder and no spouse or partner present. About 34.5% of all households were made up of individuals and 16.7% had someone living alone who was 65 years of age or older.

There were 4,392 housing units, of which 11.4% were vacant. The homeowner vacancy rate was 3.0% and the rental vacancy rate was 8.4%.

99.0% of residents lived in urban areas, while 1.0% lived in rural areas.

Racial composition as of the 2020 census
Race	Number	Percent
White	4,614	49.4%
Black or African American	3,664	39.3%
American Indian and Alaska Native	44	0.5%
Asian	51	0.5%
Native Hawaiian and Other Pacific Islander	1	0.0%
Some other race	417	4.5%
Two or more races	544	5.8%
Hispanic or Latino (of any race)	817	8.8%

=== 2000 census ===
As of the census of 2000, there were 9,916 people, 3,952 households, and 2,596 families residing in the city. The population density was 936.6 inhabitants per square mile (361.6/km^{2}). There were 4,396 housing units at an average density of 415.2 per square mile (160.3/km^{2}). The racial makeup of the city was 53.72% White, 43.57% African American, 0.26% Native American, 0.16% Asian, 0.11% Pacific Islander, 1.34% from other races, and 0.84% from two or more races. Hispanic or Latino of any race were 2.42% of the population. A 2009 census estimate put the city's population at 9,478.

There were 3,952 households, out of which 30.0% had children under the age of 18 living with them, 38.0% were married couples living together, 23.4% had a female householder with no husband present, and 34.3% were non-families. 31.3% of all households were made up of individuals, and 14.3% had someone living alone who was 65 years of age or older. The average household size was 2.38 and the average family size was 2.97.

In the city, the population was spread out, with 25.0% under the age of 18, 8.4% from 18 to 24, 25.2% from 25 to 44, 21.7% from 45 to 64, and 19.7% who were 65 years of age or older. The median age was 38 years. For every 100 females, there were 81.4 males. For every 100 females age 18 and over, there were 74.0 males.

The median income for a household in the city was $28,756, and the median income for a family was $36,656. Males had a median income of $28,149 versus $21,883 for females. The per capita income for the city was $14,582. About 12.9% of families and 17.7% of the population were below the poverty line, including 25.8% of those under age 18 and 15.5% of those age 65 or over.

== Education ==
Laurens has a lending library, the Laurens County Public Library.

The city of Laurens is served by Laurens County School District 55, which also includes the neighboring towns of Gray Court, Hickory Tavern, and Waterloo. The following public schools are located within the city of Laurens: E.B. Morse Elementary, Ford Elementary, Laurens Elementary, Sanders Middle, Laurens Middle and Laurens District 55 High. Private education includes Laurens Academy, a Christian K-12 school. Piedmont Technical College also operates a campus in Laurens.

== Government ==
Laurens City Hall is on the town square. The form of government is mayor/council. Attorney Nathan Senn serves as mayor, and members of the city council include Marian Miller, Alicia Sullivan, Cassandra Campbell, Sara Latimore, Martin Lowry, and Johnnie L. Bolt.

Senn was elected mayor on March 5, 2019, defeating the incumbent, John Stankus.

== Media ==
Laurens is the home of WLBG-AM 860, which carries a news/talk format as 'Real Radio 860.' This radio station is well-respected and the oldest of the two daily news sources in Laurens, SC. Their feature program is 'Good Morning Upcountry' with host Randy Stevens. WLBG also covers local news every morning, with smaller news "recap" segments interspersed throughout the day. Laurens also has a daily news website, GoLaurens.com. It covers news, sports and crime daily. The city's only print newspaper, The Laurens County Advertiser, is a weekly, published every Wednesday. A smaller version, called The Advertiser EXTRA, is published and distributed every Friday and distributed via mail. Unlike the large version of the Advertiser, the Laurens County Advertiser Extra is distributed free of charge, without subscription to many residents throughout Laurens County. Laurens is home to the upstate's premier commercial printer, Print-A-Matic, Inc., founded by Robert Seymour in 1979. The Laurens County Community Access Channel, ACCESS 15, a Public, educational, and government access (PEG) cable TV channel is broadcast over Charter Cable channel 15.

== Notable people ==
- Johnny Mars, One of the Founding Father’s of Blues harmonica, song writer, singer
- Pink Anderson, blues singer
- Robert Archer Cooper, Governor of South Carolina
- W. Paul Culbertson, member of the South Carolina House of Representatives and former mayor
- Reverend Gary Davis, blues and gospel guitarist and singer
- Jeff Duncan, former U.S. representative and South Carolina state representative
- John Glen (1809–95), Mayor of Atlanta
- Bob Hazle, baseball player
- Hilary A. Herbert, Secretary of the Navy under President Grover Cleveland
- Andrew Johnson, 17th U.S. president
- Ali Rogers, Miss South Carolina 2012, first runner-up at Miss America 2013
- William Dunlap Simpson, Governor of South Carolina
- James "J.T." Taylor, R&B funk singer, Kool & the Gang
- Thomas A. Wofford, United States Senator from South Carolina
