= Nickels-Milam House =

Historic house in South Carolina, United States

- U.S. National Register of Historic Places
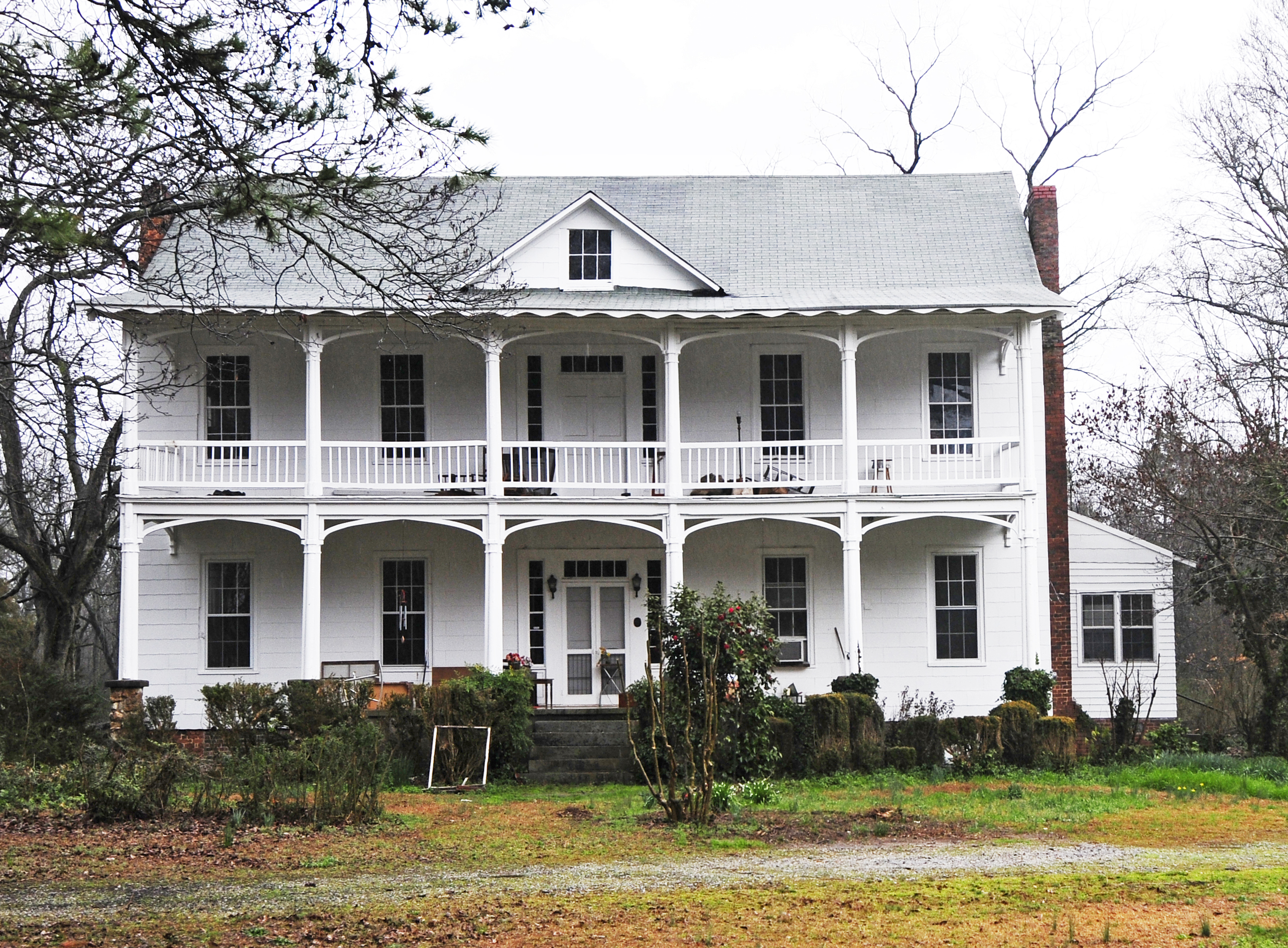
- Nickels-Milam House, February 2012

- Location within South Carolina Location within the United States
- Location: South of Laurens off U.S. Route 221, near Laurens, South Carolina
- Coordinates: 34°25′35″N 82°0′18″W
- Area: 5 acres (2.0 ha)
- Built: 1828
- Architectural style: Greek Revival
- NRHP reference No.: 76001705
- Added to NRHP: May 28, 1976

Nickels-Milam House is a historic plantation house located near Laurens, Laurens County, South Carolina. It was built about 1828, and is a three-story, five-bay, Greek Revival style frame dwelling. The interior has original moldings, paneled doors, mantels, wide-board flooring and much of the original hardware. Additionally, the property features several barns and the family cemetery.

It was added to the National Register of Historic Places in 1976.
