= Waterloo, South Carolina =

- Town
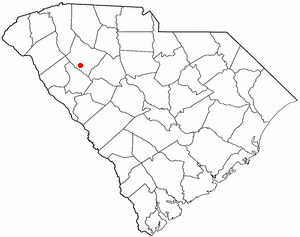
- Location of Waterloo, South Carolina
- Coordinates: 34°21′22″N 82°03′26″W
- Country: United States
- State: South Carolina
- County: Laurens

Area
  - Total: 1.78 sq mi (4.62 km^{2})
  - Land: 1.78 sq mi (4.62 km^{2})
  - Water: 0 sq mi (0.00 km^{2})
- Elevation: 637 ft (194 m)

Population (2020)
  - Total: 149
  - Density: 83.6/sq mi (32.27/km^{2})
- Time zone: UTC-5 (Eastern (EST))
  - Summer (DST): UTC-4 (EDT)
- ZIP code: 29384
- Area codes: 864, 821
- FIPS code: 45-74995
- GNIS feature ID: 2406838

Waterloo is a town in Laurens County, South Carolina, United States. As of the 2020 census, Waterloo had a population of 149.

== History ==
Waterloo was incorporated as a town in 1885.

Rosemont Plantation was added to the National Register of Historic Places in 1993.

== Geography ==
According to the United States Census Bureau, the town has a total area of 1.4 square miles (3.7 km^{2}), all land.

== Demographics ==
Historical population
Census	Pop.	Note	%±
1890	291		—
1900	189		−35.1%
1910	191		1.1%
1920	209		9.4%
1930	204		−2.4%
1940	150		−26.5%
1950	162		8.0%
1960	148		−8.6%
1970	112		−24.3%
1980	200		78.6%
1990	122		−39.0%
2000	203		66.4%
2010	166		−18.2%
2020	149		−10.2%
U.S. Decennial Census

Waterloo town, South Carolina – Racial and ethnic composition Note: the US Census treats Hispanic/Latino as an ethnic category. This table excludes Latinos from the racial categories and assigns them to a separate category. Hispanics/Latinos may be of any race.
Race / Ethnicity (NH = Non-Hispanic)	Pop 2000	Pop 2010	Pop 2020	% 2000	% 2010	% 2020
White alone (NH)	86	76	50	42.36%	45.78%	33.56%
Black or African American alone (NH)	113	87	93	55.67%	52.41%	62.42%
Native American or Alaska Native alone (NH)	1	0	0	0.49%	0.00%	0.00%
Asian alone (NH)	0	0	0	0.00%	0.00%	0.00%
Pacific Islander alone (NH)	0	0	0	0.00%	0.00%	0.00%
Other race alone (NH)	0	0	0	0.00%	0.00%	0.00%
Mixed race or Multiracial (NH)	0	3	4	0.00%	1.81%	2.68%
Hispanic or Latino (any race)	3	0	2	1.48%	0.00%	1.34%
Total	203	166	149	100.00%	100.00%	100.00%

=== 2000 census ===
As of the census of 2000, there were 203 people, 75 households, and 57 families residing in the town. The population density was 144.2 inhabitants per square mile (55.7/km^{2}). There were 85 housing units at an average density of 60.4 per square mile (23.3/km^{2}). The racial makeup of the town was 43.35% White, 56.16% African American and 0.49% Native American. Hispanic or Latino of any race were 1.48% of the population.

There were 75 households, out of which 37.3% had children under the age of 18 living with them, 45.3% were married couples living together, 17.3% had a female householder with no husband present, and 22.7% were non-families. 20.0% of all households were made up of individuals, and 9.3% had someone living alone who was 65 years of age or older. The average household size was 2.71 and the average family size was 3.05.

In the town, the population was spread out, with 28.1% under the age of 18, 10.8% from 18 to 24, 27.1% from 25 to 44, 21.7% from 45 to 64, and 12.3% who were 65 years of age or older. The median age was 33 years. For every 100 females, there were 111.5 males. For every 100 females age 18 and over, there were 102.8 males.

The median income for a household in the town was $27,917, and the median income for a family was $36,875. Males had a median income of $24,063 versus $18,750 for females. The per capita income for the town was $14,159. About 5.7% of families and 12.3% of the population were below the poverty line, including 6.4% of those under the age of eighteen and 21.4% of those 65 or over.

== Education ==
It is in the Laurens School District 55. The comprehensive high school is Laurens District 55 High School.

== Notable person ==
- W. Paul Culbertson (1918–2004), member of the South Carolina House of Representatives and mayor of Laurens, South Carolina
