= William Dunlap Simpson House =

Historic house in South Carolina, United States

- U.S. National Register of Historic Places
- U.S. Historic district – Contributing property
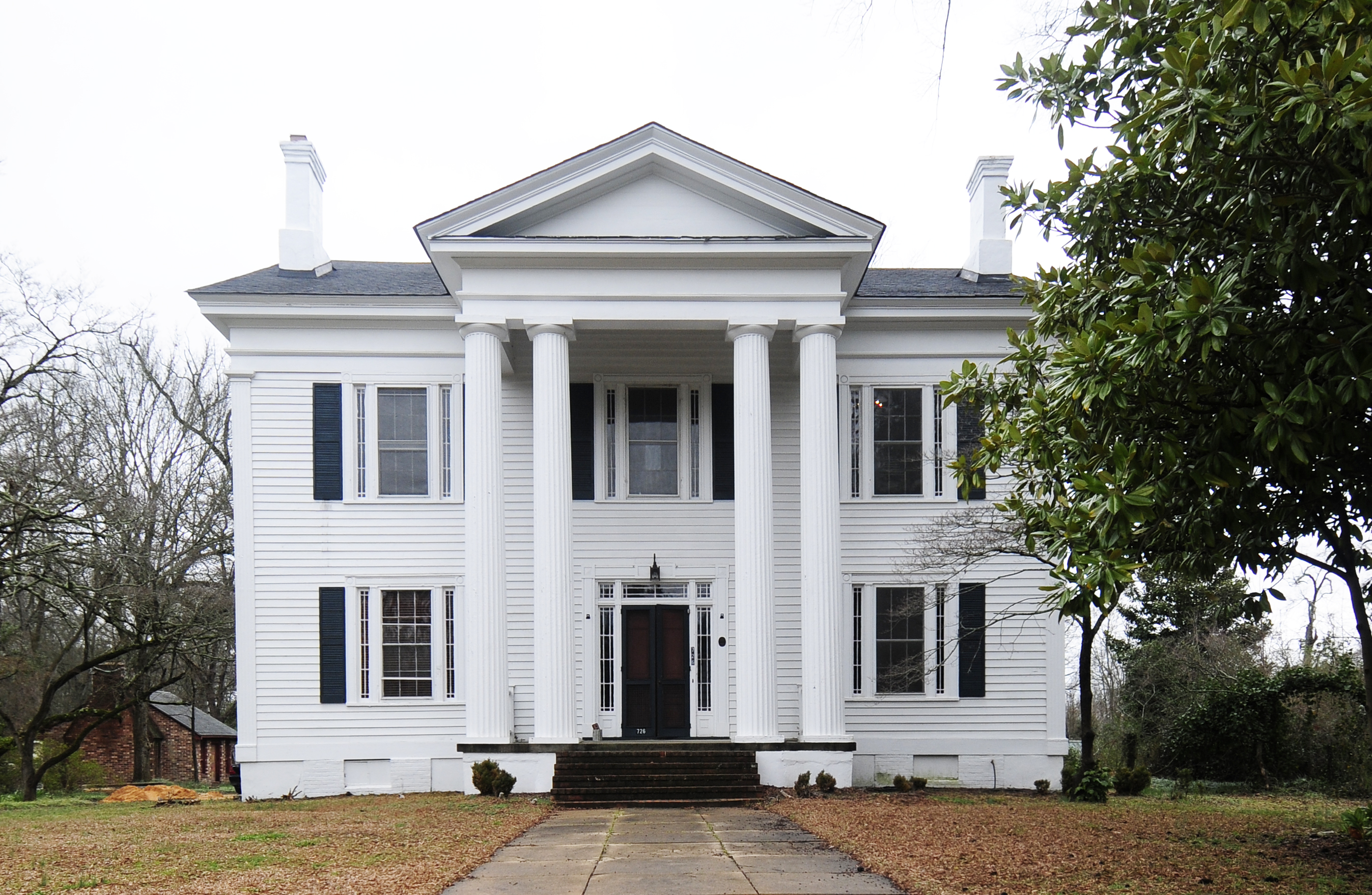
- William Dunlap Simpson House, February 2012

- Location within South Carolina Location within the United States
- Location: 726 W. Main St., Laurens, South Carolina
- Coordinates: 34°29′44″N 82°1′30″W
- Area: 2 acres (0.81 ha)
- Built: c. 1839
- Built by: Christopher Garlington
- Architectural style: Greek Revival
- NRHP reference No.: 74001862
- Added to NRHP: July 24, 1974

William Dunlap Simpson House is a historic home located at Laurens, Laurens County, South Carolina, USA. It was built about 1839 for a planter to use as his town house. The three-story, three-bay, Greek Revival style clapboard dwelling has a total of twelve rooms.

It was later the home of Congressman and South Carolina Governor William Dunlap Simpson (1823–1890).

It was added to the National Register of Historic Places in 1974. It is located in the Laurens Historic District.
