= Charles H. Duckett House =

Historic house in South Carolina, United States

- U.S. National Register of Historic Places
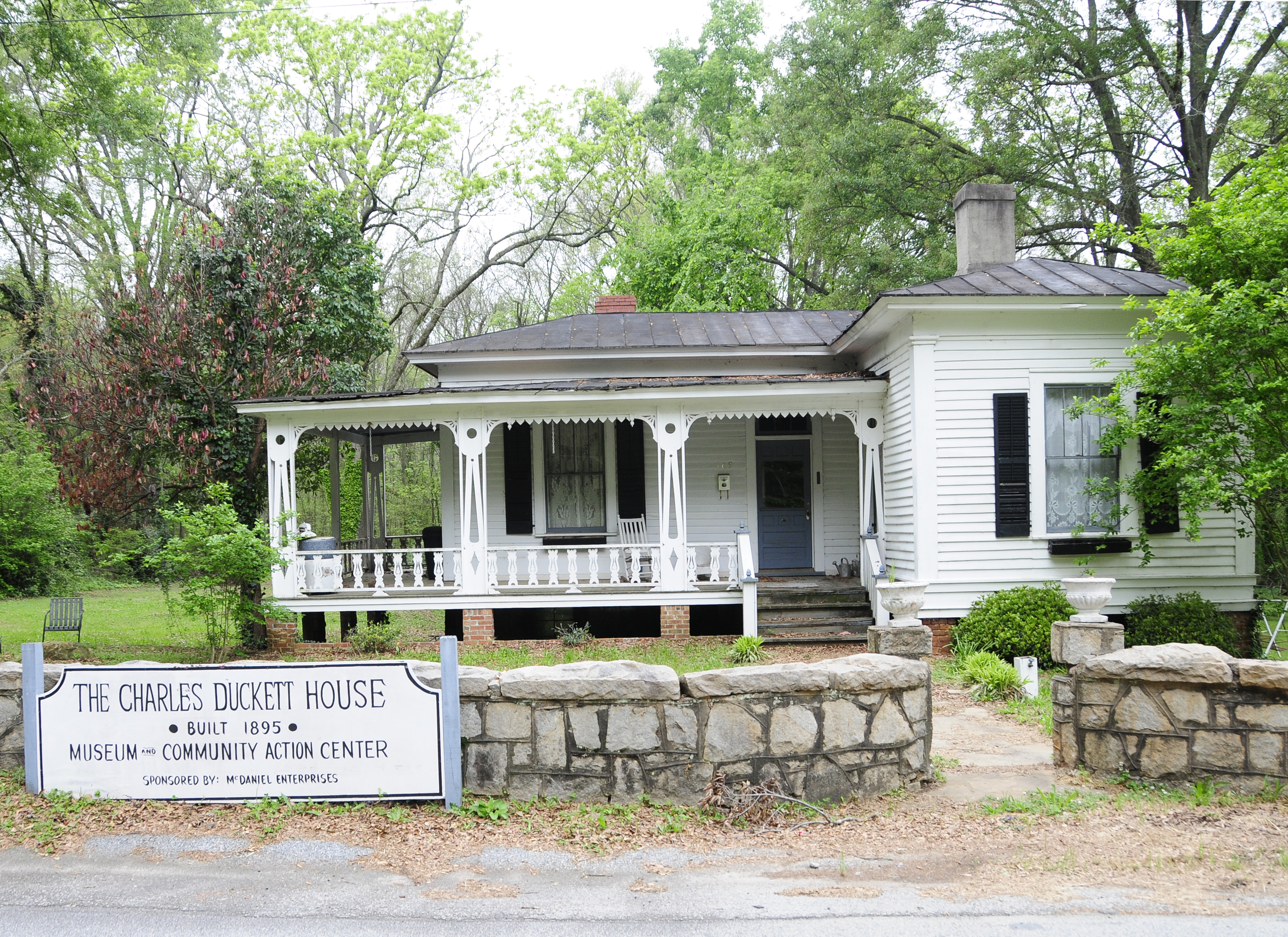
- Charles Duckett House, 2012

- Location within South Carolina Location within the United States
- Location: 105 Downs St., Laurens, South Carolina
- Coordinates: 34.496145°N 82.028183°W
- Area: less than one acre
- Built: 1892
- Built by: Charles H. Duckett
- MPS: City of Laurens MRA
- NRHP reference No.: 86003151
- Added to NRHP: November 19, 1986

The Charles H. Duckett House is a house listed on the National Register of Historic Places located in Laurens, South Carolina. The vernacular, one-story, L-shaped frame house was built ca1892 by Charles H. "Charlie" Duckett, a notable African-American businessman in Laurens. He was a contractor, a carpenter, owner of a funeral home, and owner of what for a number of years was the only lumber yard in the city.

The house, built on a brick pier foundation, has a standing seam metal hip roof with a low pitch and beaded weatherboard siding. The main entrance door has an Eastlake-style design. The interior of the house features a central hall with five rooms on the main floor and the kitchen and dining room located in the stuccoed brick wall basement. The dining room has a built-in china cabinet, a Greek revival style mantel and a paneled ceiling. The rooms of the house have plaster walls, carved mantels and picture mouldings.

Located in a neighborhood associated with the African-American community since it was first developed, the house remained in the Duckett family until 1975. It is now owned by the Laurens County African American Cultural Foundation, with an easement held by the Palmetto Trust for Historic Preservation. It is now used as a museum and community action center.
