= John Calvin Owings House =

Historic house in South Carolina, United States

- U.S. National Register of Historic Places
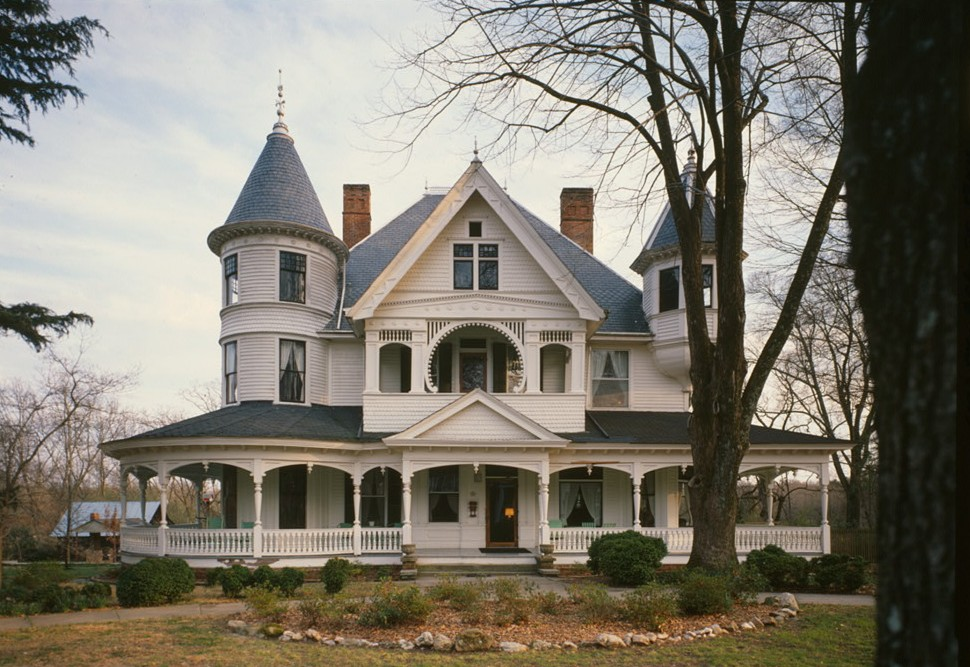
- John Calvin Owings House, HABS Photo, November 1986 – March 1987

- Location within South Carolina Location within the United States
- Interactive map showing the location of John Calvin Owings House
- Location: 787 W. Main St., Laurens, South Carolina
- Coordinates: 34°29′38″N 82°1′43″W
- Area: 5 acres (2.0 ha)
- Built: 1896
- Built by: Barber, George F. & Co.
- Architectural style: Queen regnant Anne
- NRHP reference No.: 78002520
- Added to NRHP: February 23, 1978

John Calvin Owings House is a historic home located at Laurens, Laurens County, South Carolina. It was designed by architect George Franklin Barber and built in 1896. It is a 2 1/2-story, Queen Anne style frame dwelling. It features high multiple roofs, turrets, oriels, cresting, turned spindles, and porches. The projecting front gable includes a decorated second-story portico. Also on the property are four contributing outbuildings.

It was added to the National Register of Historic Places in 1978.
