= Octagon House (Laurens, South Carolina) =

Historic house in South Carolina, United States

- U.S. National Register of Historic Places
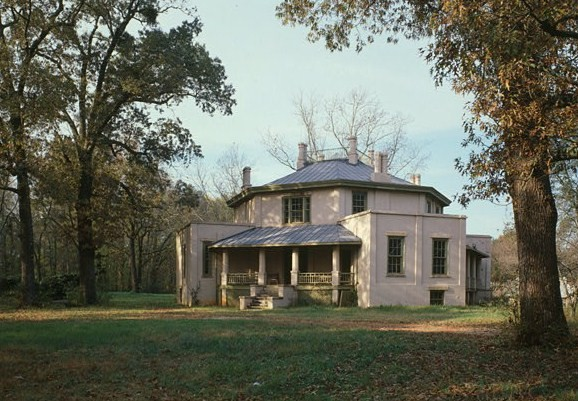
- Zelotes Holmes House

- Location within South Carolina Location within the United States
- Location: 619 East Main Street, Laurens, South Carolina
- Coordinates: 34°29′57″N 82°0′5″W
- Built: 1859
- Architect: Zelotes Lee Holmes
- Architectural style: Octagon Mode
- NRHP reference No.: 73001715
- Added to NRHP: March 20, 1973

The Octagon House, also known as Zelotes Holmes House, is a historic octagonal house located in Laurens, South Carolina, United States. Designed and built in 1859 to 1862 by the Rev. Zelotes Lee Holmes, a Presbyterian minister and teacher, it is thought to be the first concrete house erected in South Carolina. It was called the Zelotes Holmes House by the Historic American Buildings Survey.

Also known as the Old Holmes House, the Old Watson House and the Holmes-Watson House, it was added to the National Register of Historic Places on March 20, 1973.

== See also ==
- List of Registered Historic Places in South Carolina
