= Allen Dial House =

Historic house in South Carolina, United States

- U.S. National Register of Historic Places
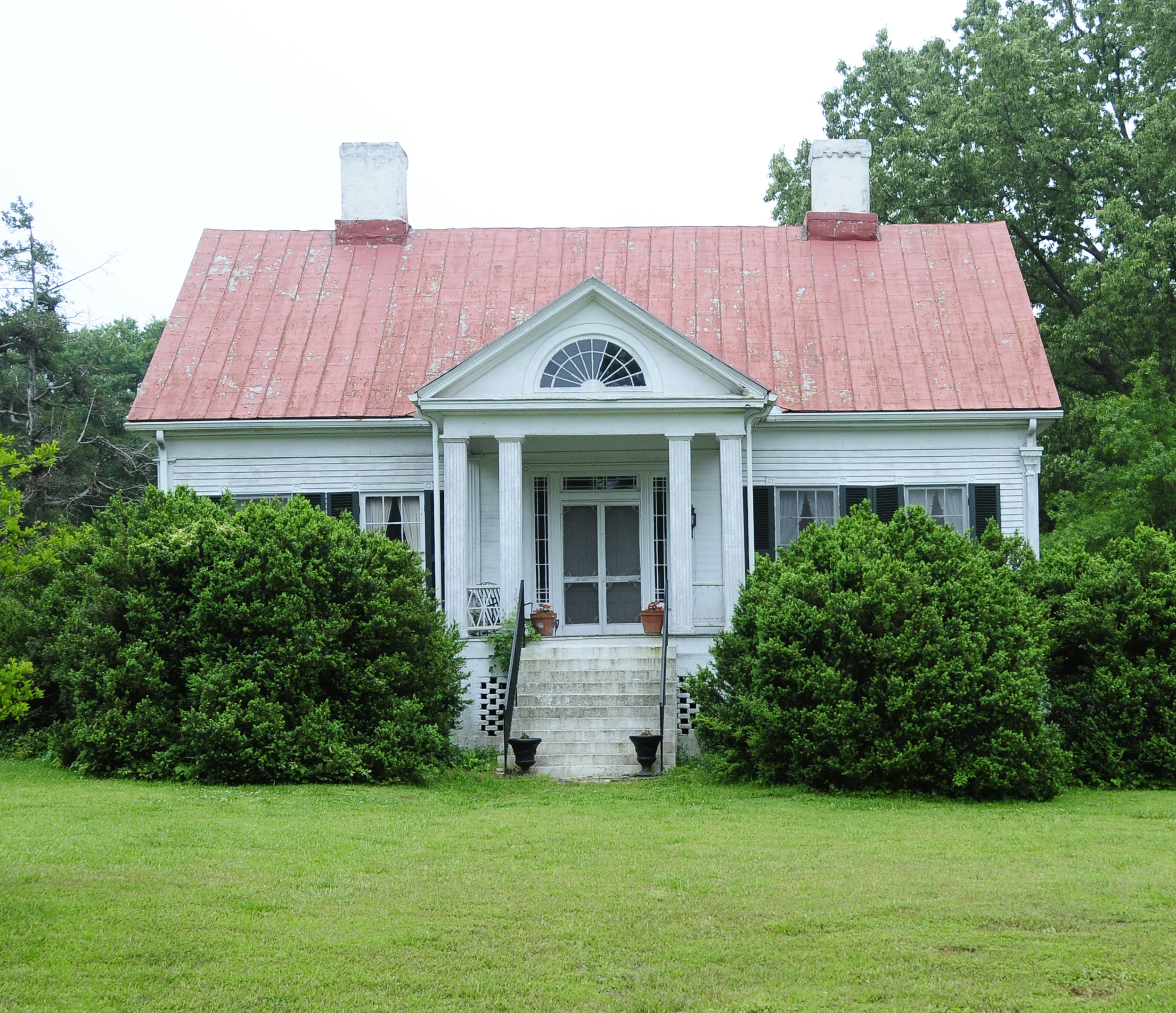
- Allen Dial House, April 2012

- Location within South Carolina Location within the United States
- Location: South Carolina Highway 729, near Laurens, South Carolina
- Coordinates: 34°28′36″N 82°6′5″W
- Area: 2.6 acres (1.1 ha)
- Built: c. 1855
- Architectural style: Greek Revival, Raised cottage
- NRHP reference No.: 82003874
- Added to NRHP: January 21, 1982

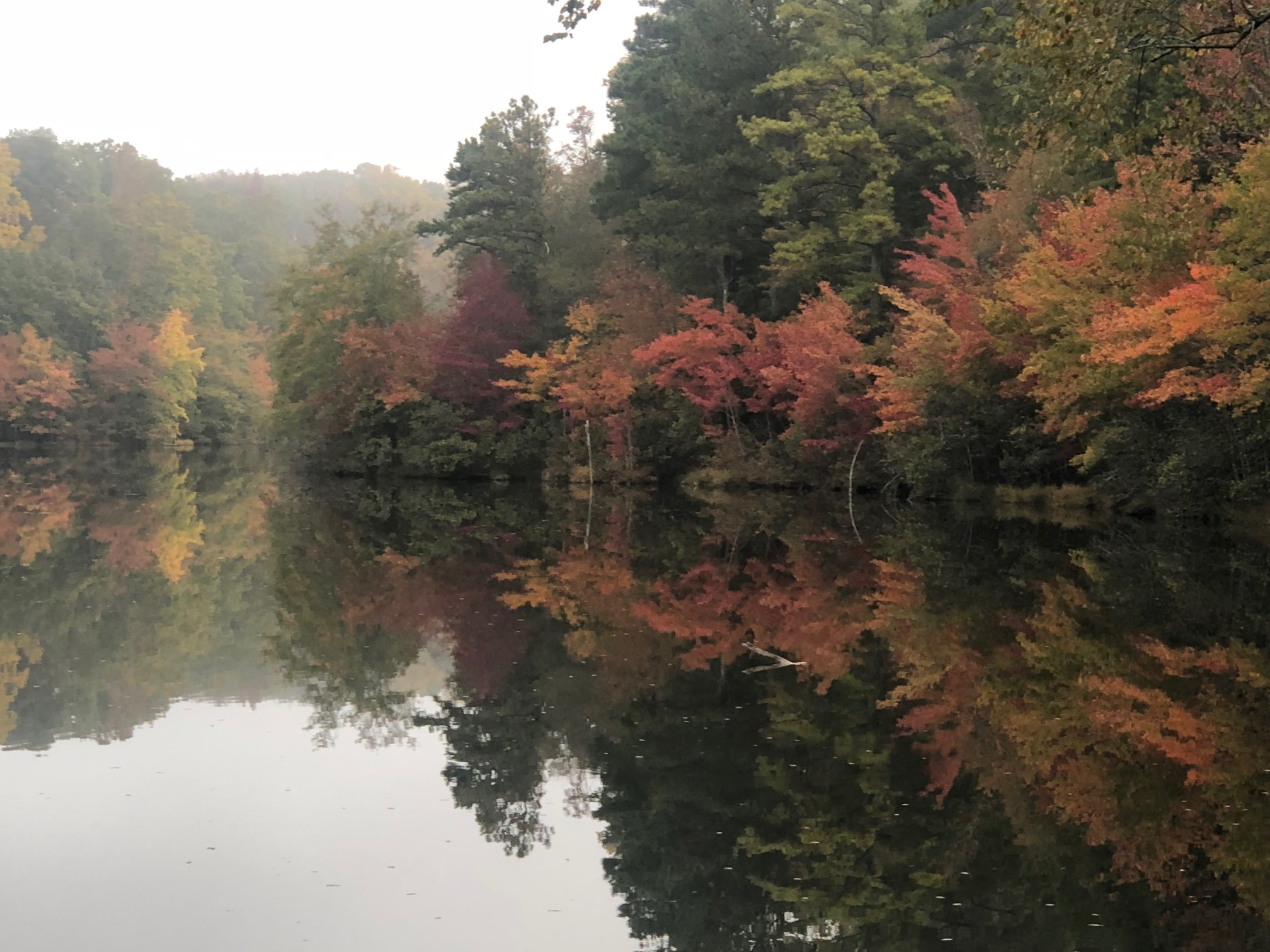

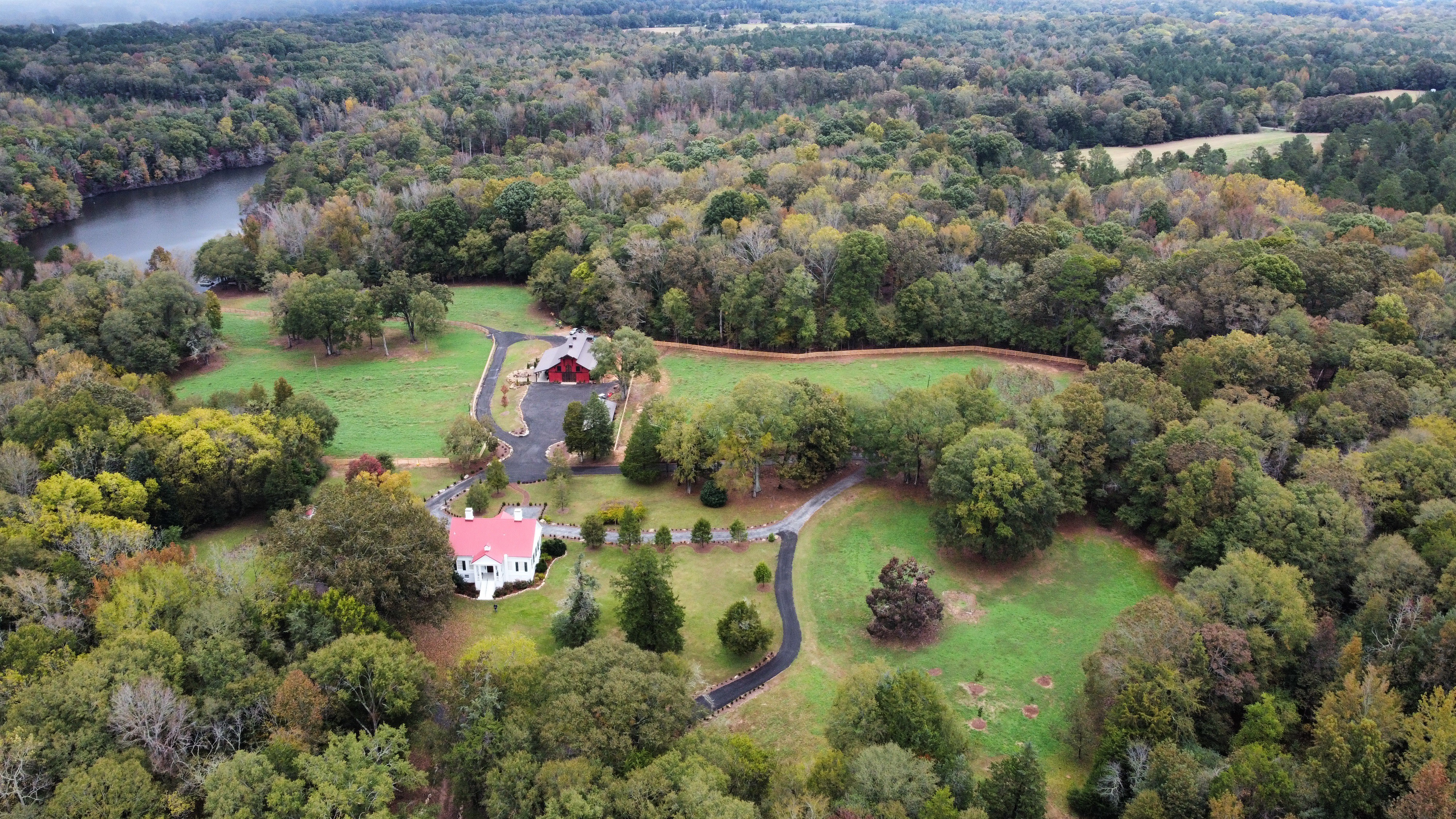

Allen Dial House, located on Cedar Valley Farm, is a historic home located near Laurens, Laurens County, South Carolina. It was built about 1855, and is a 1 1/2-story, rectangular frame dwelling sheathed in narrow width weatherboard in a vernacular interpretation of the Greek Revival style. It sits on a high stuccoed masonry foundation. The front facade features a pedimented portico supported by four paired and fluted pillars. Also on the property is a rectangular one-story outbuilding, originally a kitchen.

It was added to the National Register of Historic Places in 1982.

Cedar Valley Farm was acquired by Charles Carrington Herbert Sr. and his wife Mary Herbert, in 1950. They lived in the Allen Dial House on the farm, until their deaths in 2016 and 2018, respectively. Cedar Valley Farm was acquired by William P. Crawford Jr. and Marion R. Crawford in 2018.

Cedar Valley Farm consists of approximately 515 acres of hardwood and pine forests, as well as several ponds.
