= Williams-Ball-Copeland House =

Historic house in South Carolina, United States

- U.S. National Register of Historic Places
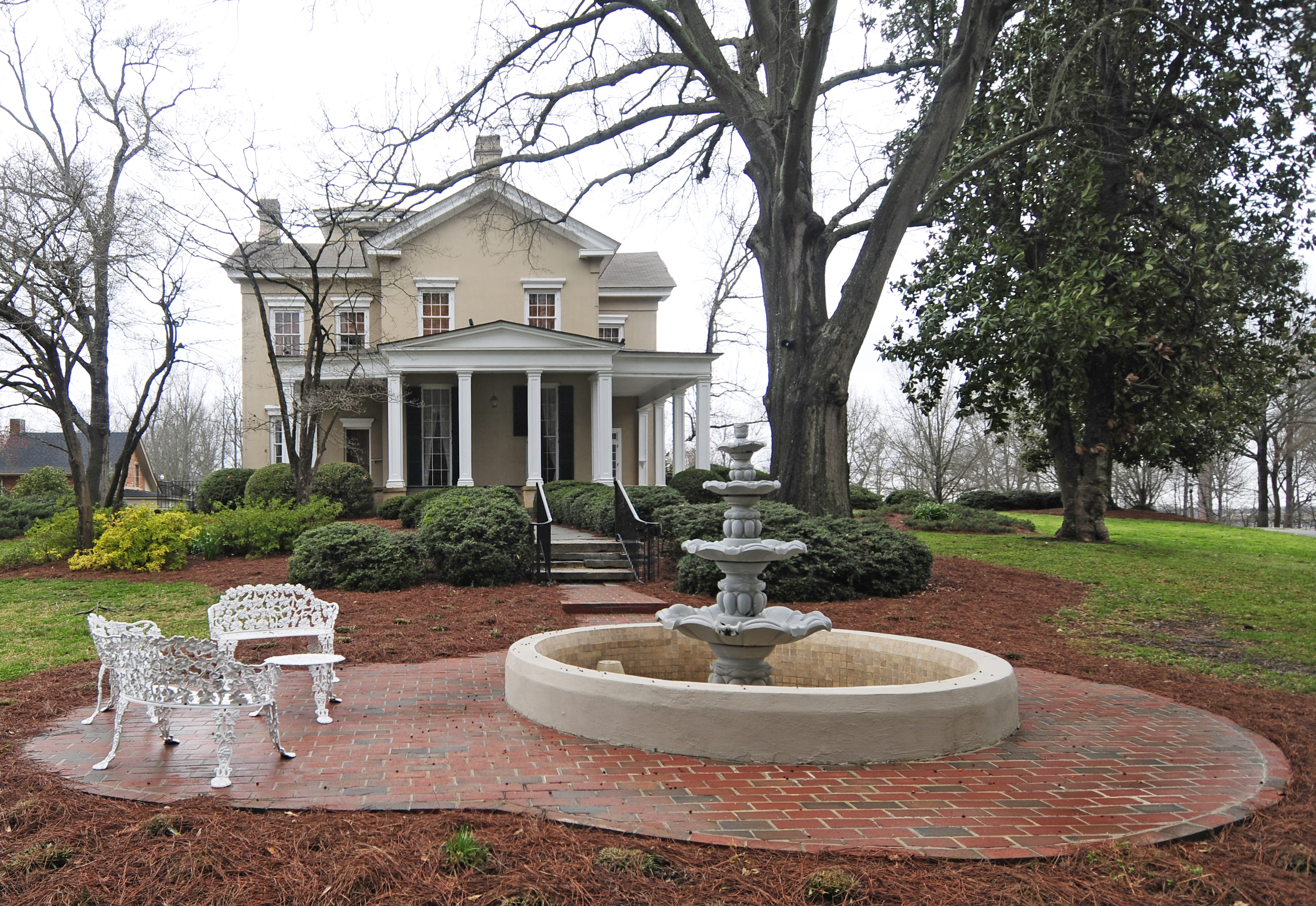
- Williams-Ball-Copeland House, February 2012

- Location within South Carolina Location within the United States
- Location: 544 Ball Dr., Laurens, South Carolina
- Coordinates: 34°30′1″N 82°1′30″W
- Area: 3 acres (1.2 ha)
- Built: 1859-1861
- Built by: Simpson, John Wells
- Architectural style: Italianate
- MPS: City of Laurens MRA
- NRHP reference No.: 86003159
- Added to NRHP: November 19, 1986

Williams-Ball-Copeland House, also known as the Franks House, The Villa, Hampton Heights, and Baptist Retirement Center, is a historic home located at Laurens, Laurens County, South Carolina. It was built about 1859-1861 as a summer residence. It is a two-story, Italianate style brick residence with a stuccoed and scored exterior. Also on the property are two, small, brick outbuildings; originally the summer kitchen and the other was a combination smokehouse and food storage house.

It was added to the National Register of Historic Places in 1986.
