= Irby-Henderson-Todd House =

Historic house in South Carolina, United States

- U.S. National Register of Historic Places
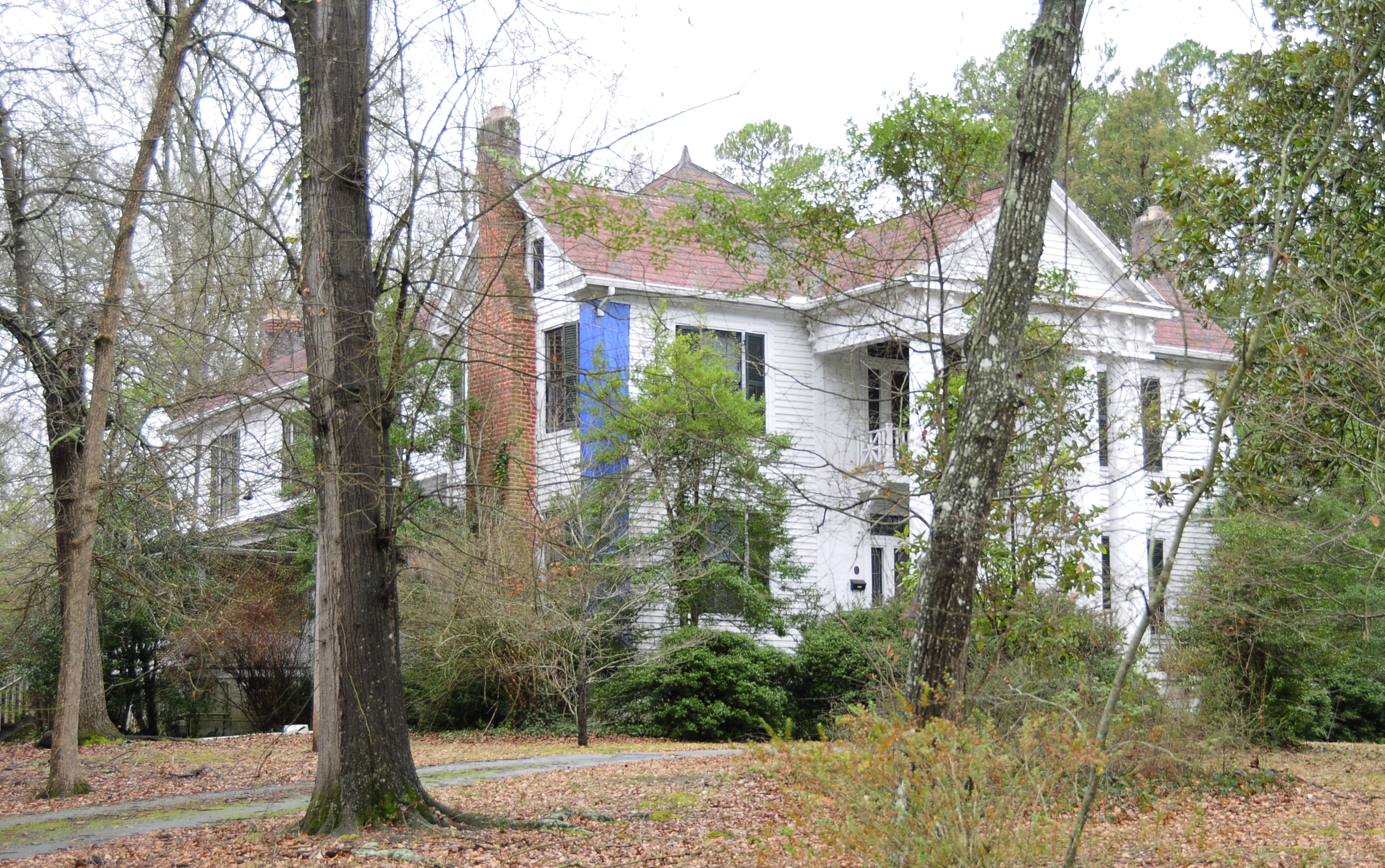
- Irby-Henderson-Todd House, February 2012

- Location within South Carolina Location within the United States
- Location: 112 Todd Ave., Laurens, South Carolina
- Coordinates: 34°29′28″N 82°1′52″W
- Area: 2.5 acres (1.0 ha)
- Built: c. 1838, c. 1855, c. 1880
- NRHP reference No.: 83002200
- Added to NRHP: September 8, 1983

Irby-Henderson-Todd House is a historic home located at Laurens, Laurens County, South Carolina. It was built about 1838 and was enlarged in both 1855 and 1880, and displays an architectural evolution from an antebellum farmhouse to a Classical Revival mansion with later Victorian details. Distinctive features include the two-story pedimented portico. Also on the property is a 19th-century well house (smokehouse).

It was added to the National Register of Historic Places in 1983.
