= Sitgreaves House =

Historic house in South Carolina, United States

- U.S. National Register of Historic Places
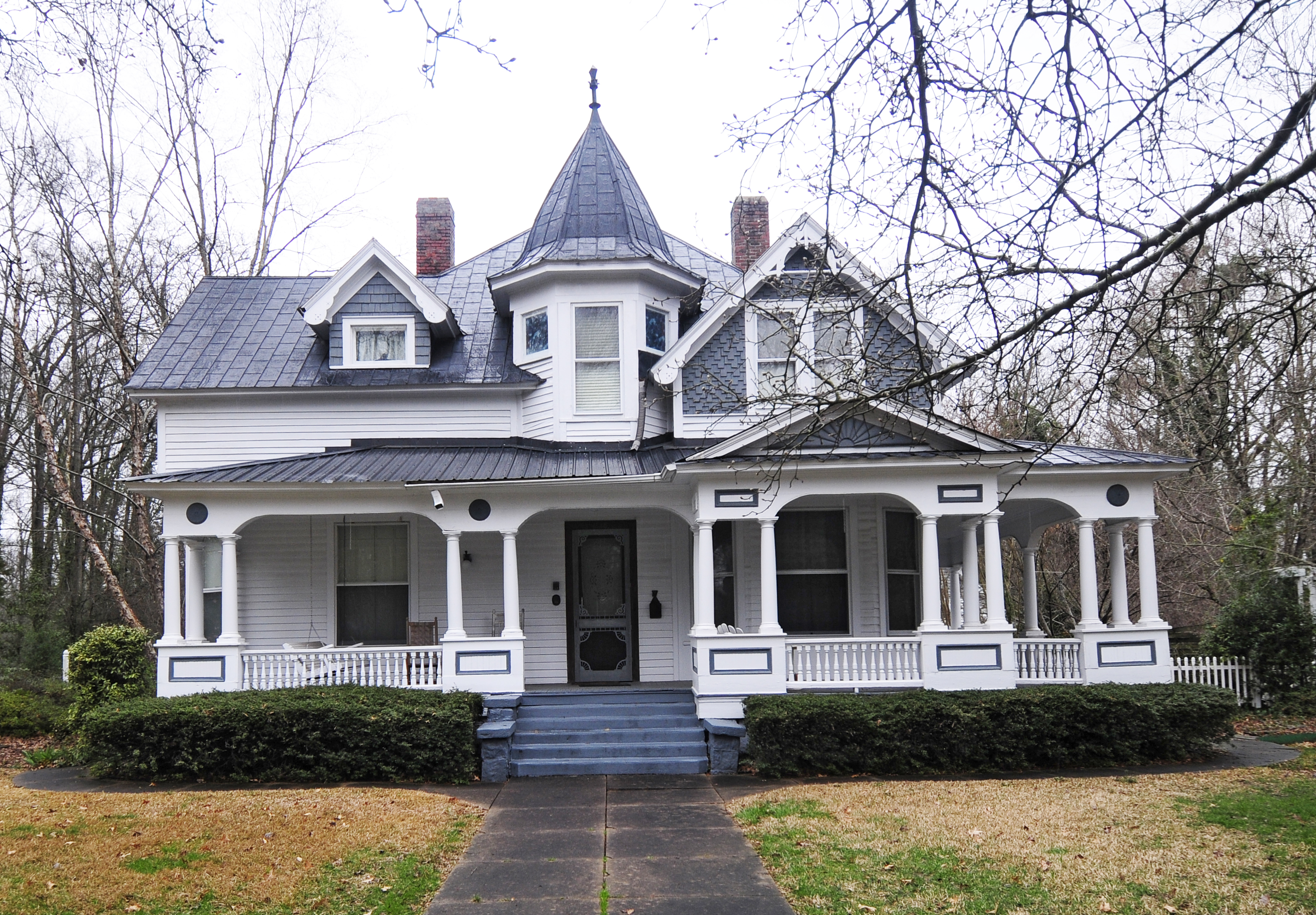
- Sitgreaves House, February 2012

- Location within South Carolina Location within the United States
- Location: 428 W. Farley Ave., Laurens, South Carolina
- Coordinates: 34°29′23″N 82°1′42″W
- Area: less than one acre
- Built: c. 1907
- Architectural style: Colonial Revival, Queen Anne
- MPS: City of Laurens MRA
- NRHP reference No.: 86003158
- Added to NRHP: November 19, 1986

Sitgreaves House, also known as the Crowe House, is a historic home located at Laurens, Laurens County, South Carolina. It was built about 1907, and is a 1 1/2-story, story, frame residence sheathed in weatherboarding with elements of the Queen Anne and Colonial Revival styles. It features a tent-roof tower, hipped roof, and porch with Doric order columns.

It was added to the National Register of Historic Places in 1986.
