= Hickory Tavern, South Carolina =

Unincorporated community in South Carolina, US

Coordinates: 34°31′16″N 82°11′19″W

Hickory Tavern, is an unincorporated community in Laurens County, South Carolina, United States. It is classified by the federal government as a class U6 populated place. It is centered at the intersection of US Route 76 and South Carolina Highway 101.

It is believed that the town is named for a tavern that operated in a grove of hickory trees in the area.

The 1849 last will and testament of Joseph Sullivan bequeathed "one tract of land, suppose [sic] to contain four hundred acres (160 ha) including the Hickory Tavern" to his minor son, Milton A. Sullivan. George W. Sullivan was named as the trustee "until my son Milton A arrives of age."

The Charlton Hall Plantation House was added to the National Register of Historic Places in 1995.
