= Lindley's Fort Site =

Archaeological site in South Carolina, United States

- U.S. National Register of Historic Places
- Nearest city: Madens, South Carolina
- Area: 2 acres (0.81 ha)
- Built: 1776
- NRHP reference No.: 78002521
- Added to NRHP: November 7, 1978

Lindley's Fort Site is a historic archaeological site located near Madens, Laurens County, South Carolina. The site is located on a wooded hill, the highest rise of land surrounded mostly by open fields. It is believed that the fort was constructed by a private individual for needed protection in the backcountry. It is possible that the fort was built during the early 1760s since there were Indian disturbances in the area during that time. Captain James Lindley, owner of the fort at the time of the American Revolutionary War, was a Loyalist. On July 15, 1776, Lindley's Fort became very important to the area residents, when part of the British plan of attack was to encourage Indian uprisings in the backcountry.

It was added to the National Register of Historic Places in 1978.
