= Albright-Dukes House =

Historic house in South Carolina, United States

- U.S. National Register of Historic Places
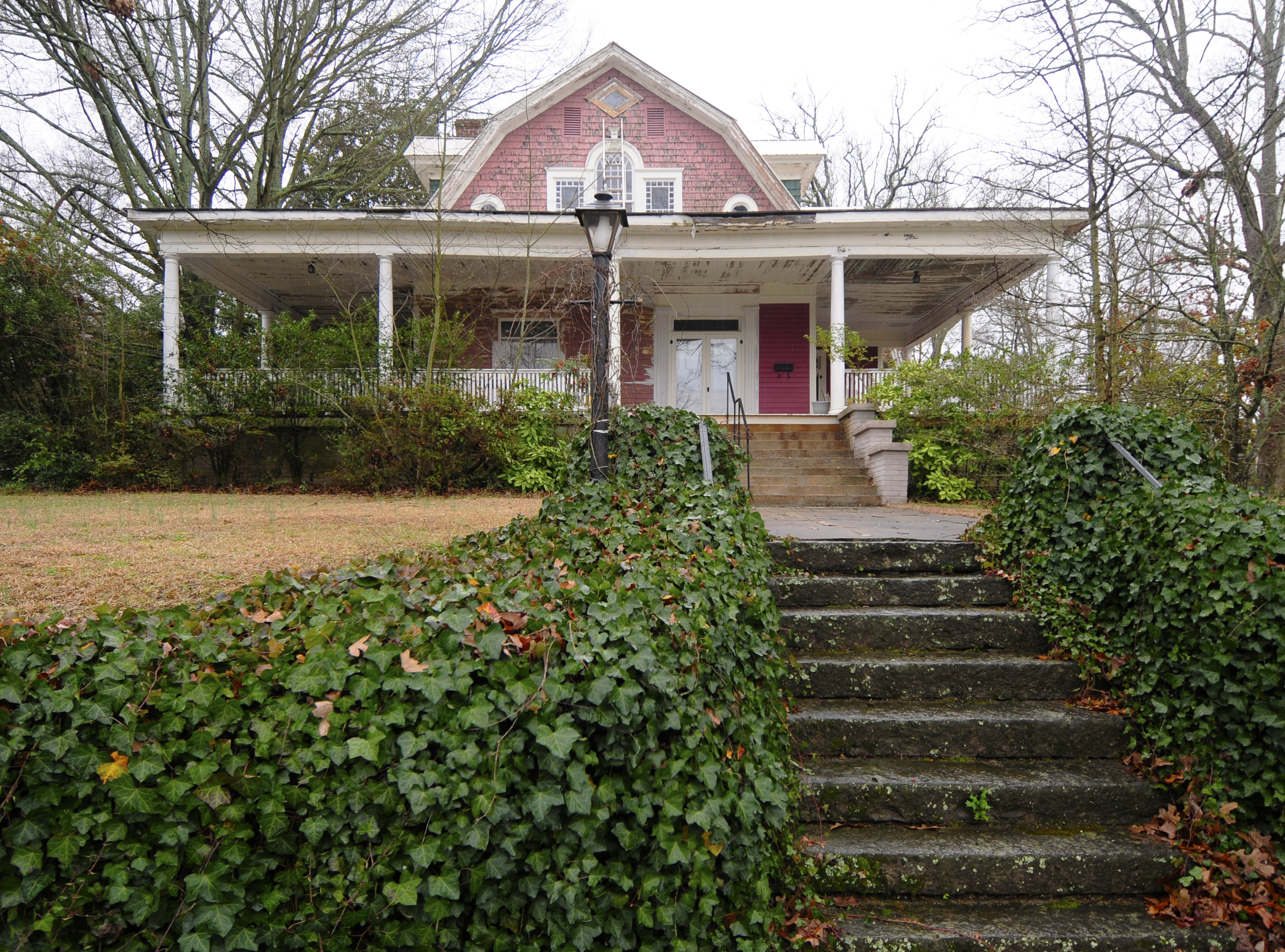
- Albright-Dukes House, February 2012

- Location within South Carolina Location within the United States
- Location: 127 Academy St., Laurens, South Carolina
- Coordinates: 34°29′25″N 82°1′5″W
- Area: less than one acre
- Built: c. 1904
- Architectural style: Colonial Revival, Dutch Colonial
- MPS: City of Laurens MRA
- NRHP reference No.: 86003149
- Added to NRHP: November 19, 1986

Albright-Dukes House, also known as the Dukes House, is a historic home located at Laurens, Laurens County, South Carolina. It was built about 1904, and is a two-story, Dutch Colonial Revival style frame dwelling. It features a cross-gambrel roof and the shingled gambrel ends with Palladian windows. It has a single-story porch, supported by Tuscan order columns.

It was added to the National Register of Historic Places in 1986.
