= Charlton Hall Plantation House =

Historic house in South Carolina, United States

- U.S. National Register of Historic Places
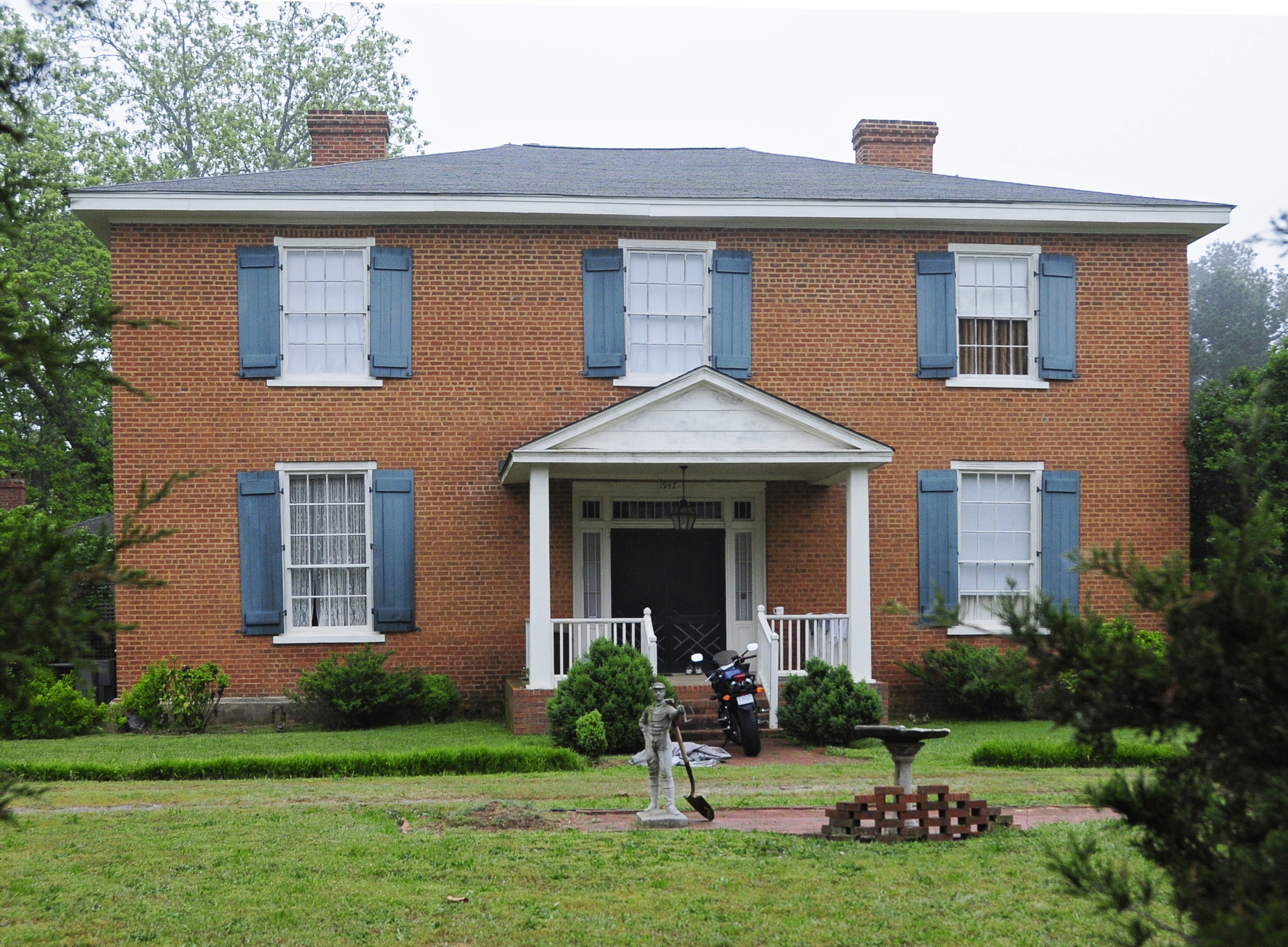
- Charlton Hall Plantation House, April 2012

- Location within South Carolina Location within the United States
- Location: South Carolina Highway 101, approximately 2.5 miles south of Hickory Tavern, near Hickory Tavern, South Carolina
- Coordinates: 34°29′40″N 82°10′6″W
- Area: 4 acres (1.6 ha)
- Built: c. 1847
- Built by: George Washington Sullivan
- Architectural style: Mid 19th Century Revival
- NRHP reference No.: 95000633
- Added to NRHP: May 26, 1995

Charlton Hall Plantation House is a historic plantation house located near Hickory Tavern, Laurens County, South Carolina. It was built about 1847, and is a two-story, three bay brick residence in the Greek Revival style. It has a low hipped roof. Also on the property are a contributing blacksmith shop/shed, a smokehouse, and a frame shed. It was the home of George Washington Sullivan, Sr., (1809–1887), a prominent farmer and public servant of Laurens District before, during, and after the American Civil War.

The 1849 last will and testament of Joseph Sullivan bequeathed “one tract of land, suppose [sic] to contain four hundred acres including the Hickory Tavern” to his minor son, Milton A. Sullivan. George W. Sullivan was named as the trustee “until my son Milton A arrives of age.”

The house was added to the National Register of Historic Places in 1995.
