= National Register of Historic Places listings in Pickens County, South Carolina =

Location of Pickens County in South Carolina

This is a list of the National Register of Historic Places listings in Pickens County, South Carolina.

This is intended to be a complete list of the properties and districts on the National Register of Historic Places in Pickens County, South Carolina, United States. The locations of National Register properties and districts for which the latitude and longitude coordinates are included below, may be seen in a map.

There are 30 properties and districts listed on the National Register in the county, including 1 National Historic Landmark.

This National Park Service list is complete through NPS recent listings posted March 14, 2025.

== Current listings ==
	Name on the Register	Image	Date listed	Location	City or town	Description
1	Arial Mill		May 18, 2023 (#100008970)	212 Rice Rd. 34°50′35″N 82°38′34″W	Easley vicinity	
2	Central High School	Central High School	May 20, 1994 (#94000475)	304 Church St. 34°43′22″N 82°46′52″W	Central	
3	Central Roller Mills	Central Roller Mills	June 25, 2013 (#13000454)	300 Madden Bridge Rd. 34°43′29″N 82°47′05″W	Central	
4	Civilian Conservation Corps Quarry No. 1 and Truck Trail		June 16, 1989 (#89000479)	Off Section Rd. 25/Hickory Hollow Rd., 0.7 miles south of South Carolina Highway 11; 35°00′17″N 82°42′46″W	Pickens	
5	Civilian Conservation Corps Quarry No. 2	Civilian Conservation Corps Quarry No. 2	June 16, 1989 (#89000480)	0.2 miles north of Section Rd. 69/Sliding Rock Rd. near the Oolenoy River; 35°00′21″N 82°43′18″W	Pickens	Granite outcropping, located on private property adjacent to Blue Hills Trail, off Sliding Rock Road
6	Clemson College Sheep Barn	Clemson College Sheep Barn	January 4, 1990 (#89002140)	S. Palmetto Boulevard on the Clemson University campus 34°40′36″N 82°49′50″W	Clemson	
7	Clemson University Historic District I	Clemson University Historic District I	January 4, 1990 (#89002138)	Northern portion of campus along U.S. Route 76; 34°40′47″N 82°50′04″W	Clemson	
8	Clemson University Historic District II	Clemson University Historic District II	January 4, 1990 (#89002139)	Center of campus 34°40′40″N 82°50′18″W	Clemson	
9	Easley High School Auditorium	Easley High School Auditorium	January 21, 1999 (#98001646)	112 Russell St. 34°50′N 82°36′W	Easley	
10	Easley Mill	Easley Mill	September 23, 2013 (#09000818)	601 S. 5th St., 34°49′27″N 82°36′28″W	Easley	
11	Fort Hill	Fort Hill	October 15, 1966 (#66000708)	Clemson University campus 34°40′40″N 82°50′21″W	Clemson	
12	Griffin-Christopher House	Griffin-Christopher House	October 21, 2001 (#01001160)	208 Ann St. 34°53′06″N 82°42′30″W	Pickens	
13	Hagood Mill	Hagood Mill	December 11, 1972 (#72001217)	3.5 miles northwest of Pickens on U.S. Route 178; 34°55′37″N 82°43′20″W	Pickens	Includes Hagood Creek Petroglyph Site
14	Hagood-Mauldin House	Hagood-Mauldin House	October 9, 1997 (#97001185)	104 N. Lewis St. 34°53′07″N 82°42′20″W	Pickens	
15	Hanover House	Hanover House	June 5, 1970 (#70000594)	Clemson University campus 34°40′35″N 82°49′52″W	Clemson	
16	Hester Store	Hester Store	February 5, 2013 (#12001263)	1735 Hester Store Rd. 34°53′48″N 82°32′20″W	Dacusville	
17	Liberty Colored High School	Liberty Colored High School	April 18, 2003 (#03000270)	Junction of South Carolina Highway 93 and Rosewood St. 34°47′23″N 82°41′23″W	Liberty	
18	Morgan House	Morgan House	March 29, 2001 (#01000312)	416 Church St. 34°43′20″N 82°46′49″W	Central	
19	Old Pickens Jail	Old Pickens Jail	April 11, 1979 (#79002390)	Johnson and Pendleton Sts. 34°52′51″N 82°42′21″W	Pickens	
20	Old Stone Church and Cemetery	Old Stone Church and Cemetery	November 5, 1971 (#71000794)	1.5 miles north of Pendleton off U.S. Route 76; 34°39′49″N 82°48′58″W	Pendleton	
21	Oolenoy Baptist Church Cemetery	Oolenoy Baptist Church Cemetery	October 14, 2003 (#03000659)	201 Miracle Hill Rd. 34°59′30″N 82°48′21″W	Pickens	
22	Pendleton Historic District	Pendleton Historic District	August 25, 1970 (#70000560)	Bounded on the west by Hopewell and Treaty Oak, on the north by the Old Stone Church, on the east by Montpelier, and on the south by the town limits 34°39′06″N 82°47′02″W	Pendleton	Extends into Anderson and Oconee counties
23	Roper House Complex	Roper House Complex	June 16, 1989 (#89000482)	Section Road 25, 0.1 miles southeast of South Carolina Highway 11; 35°01′18″N 82°41′32″W	Pickens	
24	Sheriff Mill Complex	Sheriff Mill Complex	November 20, 1987 (#87002058)	South Carolina Highway 40; 34°47′18″N 82°34′08″W	Easley	
25	J. Warren Smith House	J. Warren Smith House	January 26, 2005 (#04001564)	21 N. Palmetto St. 34°47′09″N 82°41′47″W	Liberty	
26	J. C. Stribling Barn	J. C. Stribling Barn	October 22, 2001 (#01001161)	220 Issaqueena Trail; 34°40′07″N 82°47′45″W	Clemson	
27	Structural Science Building	Structural Science Building	April 5, 2010 (#09000365)	Palmetto Boulevard and Fernow Drive; 34°40′31″N 82°50′18″W	Clemson	Now known as Lee and Lowry Halls; built in 1958 and designed by Harlan Ewart McClure, the first dean of architecture at Clemson University
28	Table Rock Civilian Conservation Corps Camp Site	Table Rock Civilian Conservation Corps Camp Site	June 16, 1989 (#89000481)	Table Rock State Park Rd. Extension at South Carolina Highway 11; 35°01′18″N 82°41′55″W	Pickens	
29	Table Rock State Park Historic District	Table Rock State Park Historic District	June 15, 1989 (#89000478)	South Carolina Highway 11, 4.5 miles east of Primary Road 45; 35°02′07″N 82°42′31″W	Pickens	
30	Williams-Ligon House		February 8, 2012 (#12000015)	1866 Farrs Bridge Rd. 34°54′10″N 82°37′03″W	Easley	

== See also ==
- List of National Historic Landmarks in South Carolina
- National Register of Historic Places listings in South Carolina
