= List of Civilian Conservation Corps camps =

Wikimedia list article

By 1935, there were as many as 2,900 Civilian Conservation Corps camps across the United States, accommodating more than 500,000 enrollees at the program's peak.

== Notable camps and facilities ==
Notable individual CCC camps, worksites and other facilities included:

=== Alabama ===
- Cheaha State Park, Delta
- DeSoto State Park, Fort Payne
- Monte Sano State Park, Huntsville

=== Arkansas ===
- Damascus CCC Camp, Co. No. 3781 Historic District, Damascus

=== California ===
- Camp San Luis Obispo, San Luis Obispo
- Camp Tulelake, Tulelake

=== Florida ===
- Highlands Hammock State Park, Sebring

=== Georgia ===
- Vogel State Park, Blairsville

=== Hawaii ===
- Civilian Conservation Corps Camp in Kōkeʻe State Park, Waimea

=== Illinois ===
- Camp Grant, Rockford
- Starved Rock State Park, Utica

=== Iowa ===
- Backbone State Park, Dundee
- Camp Flying Goose, Eldora

=== Maine ===
- Camden Hills State Park, Camden

=== Minnesota ===
- Rabideau CCC Camp, Blackduck
- Civilian Conservation Corps Camp S-52, Cusson
- Civilian Conservation Corps Camp 713, Lake City

=== New Hampshire ===
- Bear Brook State Park Civilian Conservation Corps Camp Historic District, Allenstown

=== New Jersey ===
- Belleplain State Forest, Dennis Township
- Voorhees State Park, Lebanon Township

=== New Mexico ===
- Camp Albuquerque, Albuquerque

=== New York ===
- Civilian Conservation Corps Camp S-90, Lake Pleasant
- Gilbert Lake State Park, New Lisbon

=== North Dakota ===
- Theodore Roosevelt National Park, Medora and Watford City

=== Oregon ===
- Camp Angel, Waldport

=== Pennsylvania ===
- Promised Land State Park, Blooming Grove
- Civilian Conservation Corps Camp NP-1, Gettysburg
- Civilian Conservation Corps Camp NP-2, Gettysburg
- Parker Dam State Park, Huston
- Civilian Conservation Corps Camp S-51-PA, Pine Grove Furnace

=== South Carolina ===
- Lake Greenwood State Park, Ninety Six
- Table Rock Civilian Conservation Corps Camp Site, Quarry No. 1 and Truck Trail and Quarry No. 2, Pickens

=== South Dakota ===
- Civilian Conservation Corp Camp F-10, Rapid City

=== Texas ===
- Camp Bullis, San Antonio

=== Utah ===
- Civilian Conservation Corps Camp NM-2, Torrey

=== Vermont ===
- Camp William James, Tunbridge

=== Virginia ===
- Pocahontas State Park, Chesterfield
- Goodwill Historic District, Chopawamsic RDA Camp 1, Triangle

=== Washington ===
- Civilian Conservation Corps Camps SP-3 and SP-4, Deception Pass State Park, Anacortes and Oak Harbor
- White River Mess Hall and Dormitory, Enumclaw

=== West Virginia ===
- Blue Bend Forest Camp, Alvon
- Camp Rhododendron, Morgantown

=== Wyoming ===
- Guernsey State Park, Guernsey
- Jenny Lake CCC Camp NP-4, Moose

=== Wisconsin ===
- Camp Petenwell, Necedah

== Other CCC museums ==
- Pioneer Park Historical Complex, Rhinelander, Wisconsin
