= Hagood =

Hagood may refer to:

== Places ==
- Hagood, South Carolina, unincorporated community in Sumter County, South Carolina, United States
- Hagood-Mauldin House, on the National Register of Historic Places, in Pickens, South Carolina
- Hagood Mill, operational water-powered gristmill built in 1845 by James Hagood near Pickens, South Carolina

== People ==
=== Given name ===
- Hagood Clarke (born 1942), American former college and professional football player
- Hagood Hardy, CM (1937–1997), Canadian composer, pianist, and vibraphonist

=== Surname ===
- E. Allison Hagood (born 1966), American Professor of psychology and author
- James D. Hagood (1889–1972), American politician and physician from Virginia
- Jay Hagood (born 1973), former American football offensive lineman
- Johnson Hagood (general) (1873–1948), served in France in World War I
- Johnson Hagood (governor) (1829–1898), 80th Governor of South Carolina from 1880 to 1882
- Kenny Hagood ("Pancho" Hagood) (1926–1989), American jazz vocalist
- Margaret Jarman Hagood "Marney" Hagood (1907–1963), American sociologist and demographer

== See also ==
- Hagood Creek Petroglyph Site, county-owned museum at Hagood Mill Historic Site in Pickens County, South Carolina
- Johnson Hagood Stadium, is an 11,500-seat football stadium in Charleston, South Carolina, USA
- Habgood
- Hapgood (disambiguation)
- Hargood (disambiguation)
- Hawgood
- Haygood
