= Roper House Complex =

Historic house in South Carolina, United States

- U.S. National Register of Historic Places
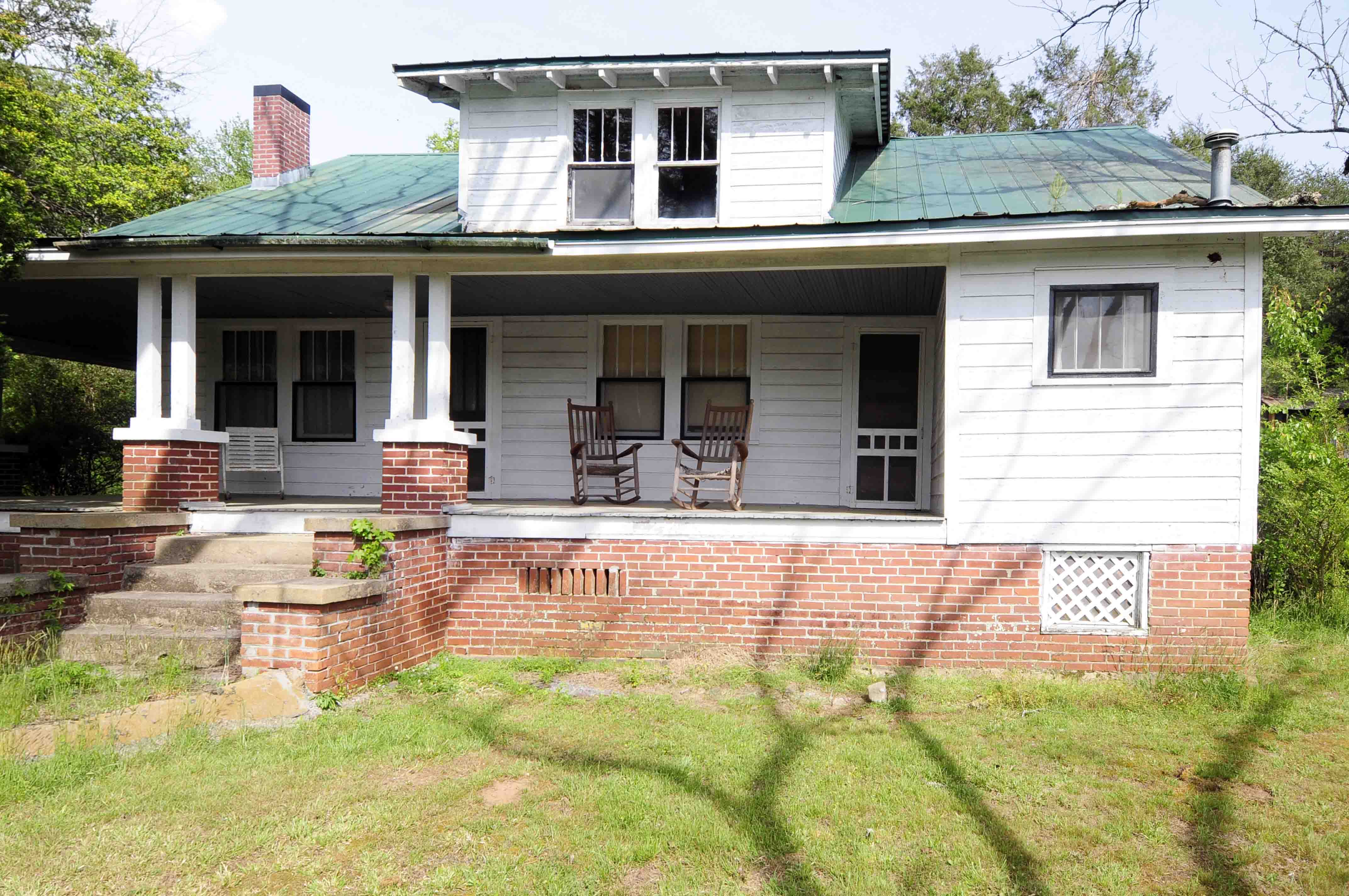
- Roper House Complex, April 2012

- Location within South Carolina Location within the United States
- Location: Section Road 25, 0.1 miles southeast of South Carolina Highway 11, near Pickens, South Carolina
- Coordinates: 35°1′18″N 82°41′32″W
- Area: 7.6 acres (3.1 ha)
- Built: 1856, 1937
- Built by: CCC; Newton, Doc Miles
- Architectural style: Bungalow/craftsman
- MPS: South Carolina State Parks MPS
- NRHP reference No.: 89000482
- Added to NRHP: June 16, 1989

Roper House Complex, also known as Camp Oolenoy and Elizabeth Ellison House, is a historic home located near Pickens, Pickens County, South Carolina. It was built in 1856, and enlarged and remodeled by the Civilian Conservation Corps (CCC) with American Craftsman influences in about 1937. Also on the property are three contributing outbuildings; a smokehouse, garage, and chicken coop. It was the home of Manning Thomas Roper, first superintendent of Table Rock State Park. He also provided the land for both CCC camps and also provided the right-of-way for the original park entrance. In 1952, the Roper House became part of the Table Rock State Park, Camp Oolenoy complex.

It was listed on the National Register of Historic Places in 1989.
