= Browning Bryant =

American singer-songwriter (1957–2019)

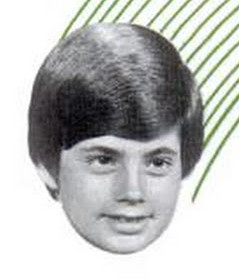
- Browning Bryant in a 1970 advertisement

Background information
- Born: John Baxter Browning Bryant; January 24, 1957; Pickens, South Carolina, U.S.
- Died: November 16, 2019 (aged 62) Pickens, South Carolina, US
- Genres: Folk; Pop; soul; funk
- Occupations: Musician; composer
- Instruments: Vocals; guitar
- Labels: Dot; RCA; Reprise
- Formerly of: Allen Toussaint; The Meters; Eddy Arnold; Bonnie Guitar; Ellen Mcilwaine

John Baxter Browning Bryant (January 24, 1957 – November 16, 2019) was an American singer-songwriter, whose greatest commercial popularity was before and during his early teens.

== Background ==
Known professionally as Browning Bryant, he was the only child of Maud and Ray Bryant, and a long-time resident of Pickens, South Carolina. He attained success singing folk-pop that was uncharacteristically mature and introspective for a pre-teen heartthrob. In 1969, the first of his several songs to generate international sales was Games that Grown Up Children Play, leading to televised appearances on The Merv Griffin Show, The Mike Douglas Show, The Ed Sullivan Show, The Kraft Music Hall (10 times), The Tonight Show (December 24, 1970), and a brief Las Vegas career. He was nominated "Best Boy Singer" in a reader poll by 16 Magazine, then a favorite with teenagers.

In 1974, Bryant's last commercial album was released. New Orleans hit-maker Allen Toussaint produced the album and wrote most of its songs. It featured backing by members of the R&B group The Meters. Though he was 15 and then 16 years old when the album was recorded, his mellifluous vocals are remarkably mature. His three self-penned songs also belied his age, with one, "Cure My Blues", being covered by blues singer Ellen McIlwaine. (Allmusic calls her version "majestic".) Despite recording in a style drastically different than his earlier work, it turned out that Bryant was well-paired with Toussaint's trademark syncopated funk.

In the 1970s Bryant briefly ventured into theater with the lead role in a musical road show production of Tom Sawyer.

After his career waned, Bryant graduated from Clemson University with a political science degree, and then worked for many years in management for the Belk department store chain. He continued to write songs and record privately.

Bryant died at home, survived by his parents.

== Discography ==
=== Commercial albums ===
Patches (1969, DOT DLP 25968)

1. Patches
2. You Mean All the World to Me
3. Hey Little Girl
4. Running Bear
5. Moods of Mary
6. What is a Youth
7. Tower of Strength
8. Games that Grown Up Children Play
9. It's a Beautiful Day
10. Poppa Says (Dawn Holds Another Day)
11. She Thinks I Still Care
12. As Usual

One Time in a Million (1970, RCA LSP 4356)

1. One Time in a Million
2. Yesterday
3. Sweet Caroline
4. Don't Wait Till Mornin' Comes
5. Raindrops Keep Fallin' on My Head
6. For Once in My Life
7. Happy Man
8. Today
9. What the World Needs Now
10. Jean
11. La la la (If I Had You)

Browning Bryant (1974, Reprise MS 2191)

1. You Might Say (Toussaint)
2. Say You Will (Toussaint)
3. Leave the Rest to Molly
4. This is My Day (Toussaint)
5. Cure My Blues (Bryant)
6. Liverpool Fool (Toussaint)
7. Blinded by Love (Toussaint)
8. Cover Girl (Toussaint)
9. Losing (Bryant)
10. Performance (Toussaint)
11. Home (Bryant)
- Produced by Allen Toussaint

In 2013, "Browning Bryant" was remastered and rereleased as a cd with original art as mini-sleeve by WEA Japan. It is available as a digital download and through major streaming services.

=== Private recordings ===
Some Favorites of Mine

1. The Girl from Ipanema (DeMorales/Jobim)
2. Suddenly (Diamond/Ocean)
3. And I Love You So (McLean)
4. The Christmas Song (Torme)
5. The Summer Wind (Mercer/Mancini)
6. The Nearness of You (Washington/Carmichael)
7. Here's that Rainy Day (Burke/Huesen)
8. Smile (Parsons/Turner/Chaplin)
- Recorded February 9, 1992, at Reflection Sound Studios, Charlotte, North Carolina
- Digitally remixed at Workhorse Studio, Easley, South Carolina

Frankandsince

1. "I Could Write a Book" (Richard Rodgers, Lorenz Hart)
2. "Fly Me to the Moon" (Bart Howard)
3. "I've Got a Crush on You (George Gershwin, Ira Gershwin)
4. "I've Got You Under My Skin" (Cole Porter)
5. "It Had to be You" (Isham Jones, Gus Kahn)
6. "Witchcraft" (Cy Coleman, Carolyn Leigh)
7. "Our Love is Here to Stay" (George Gershwin, Ira Gershwin)
8. "But Not for Me" (George Gershwin, Ira Gershwin)
9. "Don't Get Around Much Anymore" (Duke Ellington, Bob Russell)
- Recorded July 9, 1995, at Reflection Sound Studios, Charlotte, North Carolina
- Digitally remixed at Workhorse Studio, Easley, South Carolina

Merry Christmas From Browning Bryant

1. This Christmas
2. The Christmas Song
3. Silver Bells
4. Have Yourself a Merry Little Christmas
5. The Little Drummer Boy
6. Mary's Little Boy Child
7. Do You Hear What I Hear
8. What Child is This
9. The First Noel
10. Away in a Manger
11. Let it Snow
12. Happy Holidays
- Produced, arranged, all vocals and instruments by Browning Bryant, except Wade Powell, rhythm guitar and Maud Bryant, harmony vocal on Silver Bells.
- Recorded November 2003 at Workhorse Studio, Easley, South Carolina

=== Various artist compilation albums ===
- Deep Ear (1974, Warner Bros. PRO 591); "This is My Day" from the album Browning Bryant.

=== Singles ===
- "Games that Grown Up Children Play" / "Hey Little Girl" (1969, Dot 17193)
- "She Thinks I Still Care" / "Poppa Says" (Dot 17236)
- "New Way to Live" / "Patches" (1969, Dot 17311)
- "Little Altar Boy" / "They Stood in Silent Prayer" (1969, Dot 17328)
- "One Time in a Million" / "Tina" (1970, RCA 9825)
- "Liverpool Fool" / "Cover Girl" (1974, Reprise REP 1201)
