= Habgood =

Habgood is a surname. Notable people with the surname include:

- Anthony Habgood (born 1946), British businessman
- Ian Habgood (born 1974), English composer
- John Habgood (1927–2019), Anglican archbishop
- Francis Habgood (born 1964), Chief Constable of Thames Valley police

== See also ==
- Hagood (disambiguation)
