= Pinnacle Mountain (South Carolina) =

Mountain in South Carolina, United States

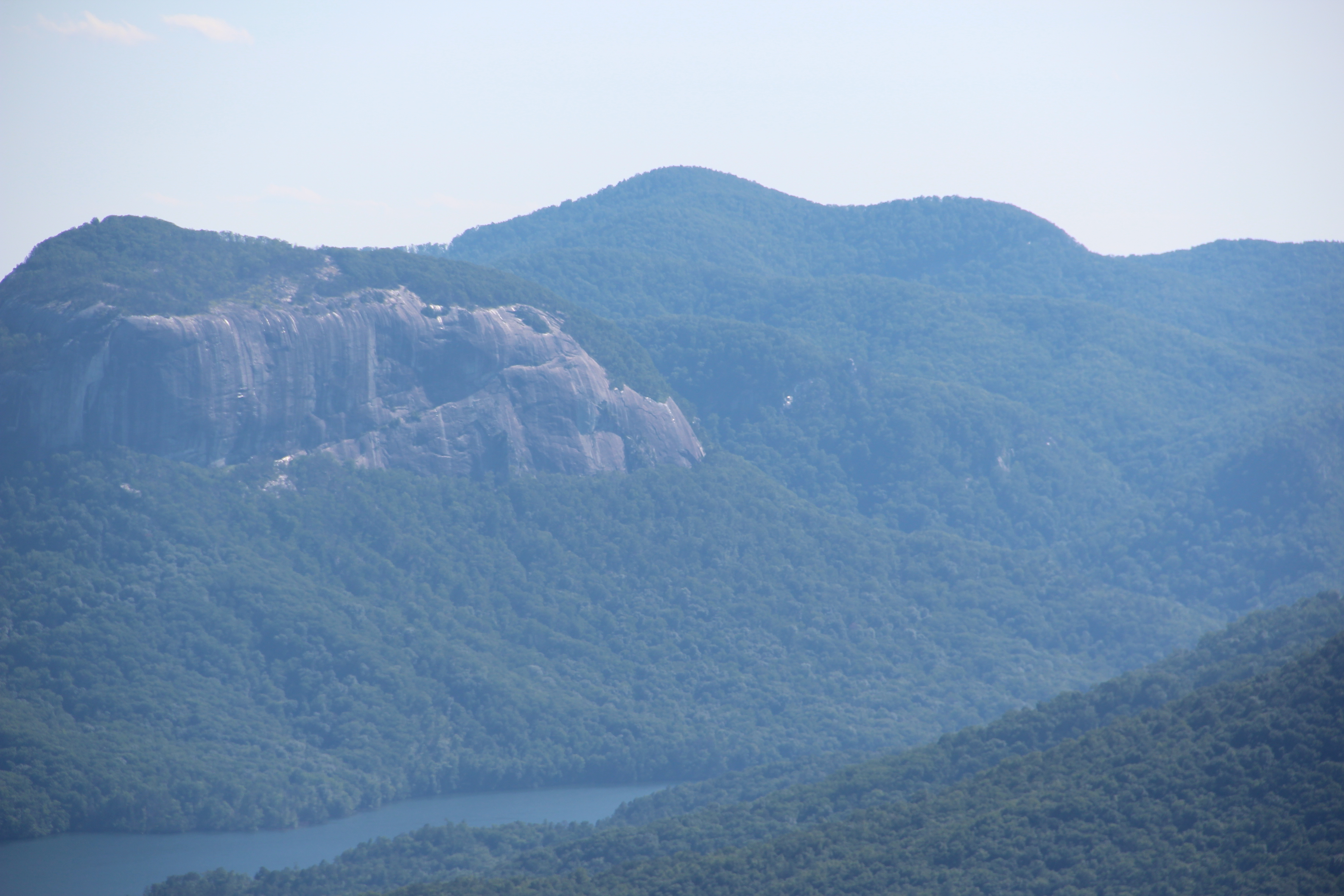
- Pinnacle Mountain viewed from Caesars Head State Park. Table Rock Mountain can be seen to the left

Highest point
- Elevation: 3,415 ft (1,041 m)
- Prominence: 705 ft (215 m)
- Coordinates: 35°02′01″N 82°44′29″W

Geography
- Location: Pickens County, South Carolina, U.S.
- Parent range: Blue Ridge Mountains
- Topo map: USGS Table Rock

Pinnacle Mountain is the tallest mountain contained entirely within the state of South Carolina (the state's highest point, Sassafras Mountain, is partially in North Carolina). It is located within Table Rock State Park in Pickens County, South Carolina. The summit of the mountain is accessible by hiking trails, the shortest of which is 4.2 miles one-way and begins at the Table Rock State Park Nature Center.

Pinnacle Mountain is typical of the southern Appalachians. It's mainly an eroded mountain of gentler slopes with a summit completely cloaked, principally in poplar, oaks, and other hardwoods. There is some very steep forest terrain on the eastern side of the peak, Bald Rock, where there are some cliffs and slopes.

In the late 1990s, some 600 plus prehistoric petroglyphs were discovered at Pinnacle Mountain. The petroglyphs, believed to be created by the Hopewell culture, pre-date the Cherokees and are believed to be between 1,500 and 3,500 years old.
