= Central, South Carolina =

- Town
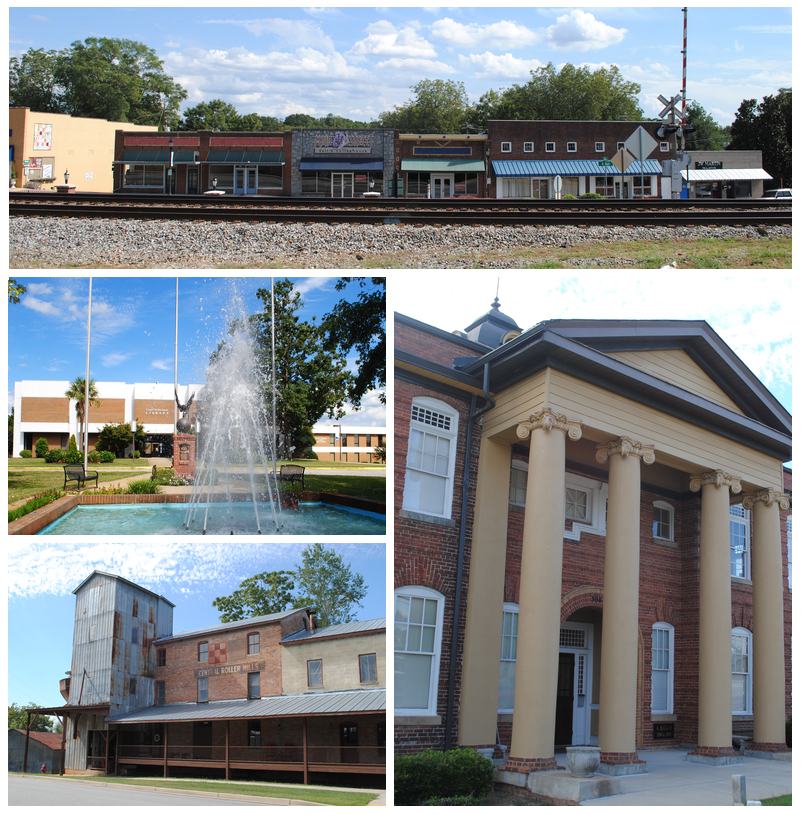
- Top, left to right: Downtown Central, Southern Wesleyan University, Central Roller Mills, Central High School

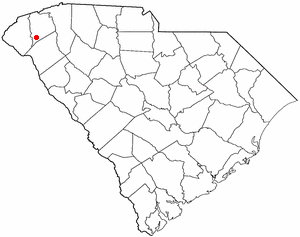
- Location of Central within South Carolina
- Coordinates: 34°43′24″N 82°46′39″W
- Country: United States
- State: South Carolina
- County: Pickens
- Incorporated: 1875

Government
  - Mayor: Andrew J. Beckner

Area
  - Total: 3.07 sq mi (7.94 km^{2})
  - Land: 3.06 sq mi (7.93 km^{2})
  - Water: 0.0039 sq mi (0.01 km^{2})
- Elevation: 873 ft (266 m)

Population (2020)
  - Total: 5,247
  - Density: 1,713.4/sq mi (661.56/km^{2})
- Time zone: UTC−5 (Eastern (EST))
  - Summer (DST): UTC−4 (EDT)
- ZIP Code: 29630
- Area codes: 864, 821
- FIPS code: 45-13015
- GNIS feature ID: 2406246
- Website: cityofcentral.org

Central is a town in Pickens County, South Carolina, United States. As of the 2020 census, Central had a population of 5,247. It received its name from being halfway or the central point between Atlanta and Charlotte along the former Atlanta and Richmond Air-Line Railway line. Southern Wesleyan University's main campus is east of downtown Central.

== History ==
Central was founded by the Atlanta and Richmond Air Line Railway in a railroad boom that began in 1873. The town's name represents the fact that it is midway between Atlanta and Charlotte. Central was incorporated as a town on March 17, 1875.

In 1897, Southern Railway moved its headquarters from Central to Greenville; trains no longer stopped to change engines, and soon all shops and offices were closed. The establishment of Issaqueena Mill and, in 1906, Wesleyan Methodist Bible Institute (now Southern Wesleyan University) brought people back to the town.

Two buildings on Church Street in Central are listed on the National Register of Historic Places: Central High School and Morgan House. The Central Roller Mills on Madden Bridge Road was listed in 2013.

== Geography ==
According to the United States Census Bureau, the town has an area of 2.4 square miles (6.2 km^{2}), all of it land.

Downtown Central is bisected by a rail line. A significant number of late 19th- to early 20th-century commercial buildings remain, most of which are single-story and retain a good amount of historical integrity. As of 2006, a downtown streetscape project is underway that is designed to improve the area's aesthetics. There are also many modest pre-World War II homes near the downtown. Central has several large apartment complexes, including The Reserve, which primarily house students from nearby Clemson University (who can use Clemson Area Transit to get there), as well as from Southern Wesleyan University.

The Central Heritage Society has a museum and information on many historic buildings and homes in the area.

=== Attractions ===
In addition to Southern Wesleyan University, the town is home to Grand Central Station, a disc golf course that hosts Professional Disc Golf Association (PDGA) tournaments.

== Demographics ==
Historical population
Census	Pop.	Note	%±
1880	184		—
1890	396		115.2%
1900	349		−11.9%
1910	886		153.9%
1920	898		1.4%
1930	1,440		60.4%
1940	1,496		3.9%
1950	1,263		−15.6%
1960	1,473		16.6%
1970	1,550		5.2%
1980	1,914		23.5%
1990	2,438		27.4%
2000	3,522		44.5%
2010	5,159		46.5%
2020	5,247		1.7%
U.S. Decennial Census

Central is part of the Greenville–Mauldin–Easley metropolitan area.

=== 2000 census ===
As of the census of 2000, there were 3,522 people, 1,560 households, and 617 families residing in the town. The population density was 1,463.4 inhabitants per square mile (565.0/km^{2}). There were 1,832 housing units at an average density of 761.2 per square mile (293.9/km^{2}). The racial makeup of the town was 79.70% White, 15.25% African American, 1.79% Asian, 0.03% Native American, 2.13% from other races, and 1.11% from two or more races. Hispanic or Latino of any race were 4.32% of the population.

There were 1,560 households, of which 17.2% had children under the age of 18 living with them, 27.1% were married couples living together, 8.9% had a female householder with no husband present, and 60.4% were non-families. 35.1% of all households were made up of individuals, and 7.2% had someone living alone who was 65 years of age or older. The average household size was 2.19 and the average family size was 2.91.

In the town, the population was spread out, with 15.1% under the age of 18, 37.4% from 18 to 24, 25.7% from 25 to 44, 12.7% from 45 to 64, and 9.2% who were 65 years of age or older. The median age was 24. For every 100 females, there were 116.3 males. For every 100 females age 18 and over, there were 115.5 males.

The median income for a household in the town was $23,869, and the median income for a family was $39,524. Males had a median income of $26,855 versus $22,207 for females. The per capita income for the town was $14,394. About 11.3% of families and 29.2% of the population were below the poverty line, including 19.0% of those under age 18 and 8.2% of those age 65 or over.

=== 2010 census ===
Central's population has grown rapidly since 2000, mostly due to the construction of apartment complexes for students attending Clemson University, Southern Wesleyan and Tri-County Technical College.

=== 2020 census ===
Central racial composition
Race	Num.	Perc.
White (non-Hispanic)	3,375	64.32%
Black or African American (non-Hispanic)	911	17.36%
Native American	18	0.34%
Asian	305	5.81%
Other/Mixed	251	4.78%
Hispanic or Latino	387	7.38%

As of the 2020 United States census, there were 5,247 people, 2,483 households, and 796 families residing in the town.

== Education ==
Public education is provided by the School District of Pickens County (Pickens 01), which is the sole school district of the county.

Zoned schools include: Central Academy of the Arts (elementary school), R. C. Edwards Middle School, and D. W. Daniel High School, a 2005 National Blue Ribbon School.

The Central-Clemson Regional Branch library, part of the Pickens County Library System, serves as the community's public library.

Central shares educational facilities and transportation services with the adjacent city of Clemson.

Central is home to Southern Wesleyan University's main campus. Southern Wesleyan University is a SACS-accredited four-year Christian university founded in 1906. The main campus houses over 600 traditional undergraduate students. It has three main housing buildings, two fine arts centers, a dining hall, a library, a gym, and many class buildings. The campus is also home to FWC Alive, a Wesleyan church that offers a traditional worship service and a contemporary worship service.

Central has a public library, a branch of the Pickens County Library System.

== Town government ==
The town has a council form of government, with six elected council members and a mayor serving as the presiding officer. Members of council are elected to four-year terms. Day-to-day operations are governed by a town administrator.

== Notable people ==
- Lindsey Graham, United States Senator
- Darline Graham, United States Senator; successor to brother Lindsey
- DeAndre Hopkins, NFL wide receiver for the Tennessee Titans
- Jarvis Jenkins, former NFL defensive lineman
- Shaq Lawson, NFL defensive end for the Buffalo Bills
- Furman L. Smith, Medal of Honor recipient, fought and died during World War II, is buried in Central.
- Timothy L. Smith, historian and educator
- DeShawn Williams, NFL defensive lineman for the Denver Broncos
