= Hapgood =

Hapgood could refer to:

People

- Isabel Florence Hapgood (1851–1928), American writer and translator of Russian texts
- Norman Hapgood (1868–1937), American writer and journalist
- Hutchins Hapgood (1869–1944), American journalist and individualist anarchist
- Powers Hapgood (1899–1949), American Trade Union Organizer and Socialist Party leader
- Charles Hapgood (1904–1982), American college professor, known for his catastrophic pole shift theories
- Eddie Hapgood (1908–1973), English football player, who captained both Arsenal and England
- Tony Hapgood (1930–2011), English football player
- Leon Hapgood (born 1979), English football player
- J. Bowden Hapgood, fictional character in Anyone Can Whistle

Buildings

- Hapgood House (built 1726), historic house in Stow, Massachusetts
- Richard Hapgood House (built 1889), historic house in Cambridge, Massachusetts

Other

- Hapgood, a 1988 play by Tom Stoppard
