= Patches (Dickey Lee song) =

Single by Dickey Lee

from the album The Tale of Patches
- B-side: "More or Less"
- Released: 1961
- Studio: Gulf Coast (Beaumont, Texas)
- Genre: Pop
- Length: 2:54
- Label: Smash
- Songwriters: Barry Mann, Larry Kolber
- Producers: Bill Hall, Jack Clement

Dickey Lee singles chronology
"Life in a Teenage World" (1960)	"Patches" (1961)	"Walkin' Through a Cemetery" (1962)

"Patches" is a song written by Barry Mann and Larry Kolber and performed by Dickey Lee. The song was produced by Bill Hall and Jack Clement. It was featured on his 1962 album The Tale of Patches. It reached No. 6 on the U.S. pop chart and No. 10 on the U.S. R&B chart in 1962. The song ranked No. 74 on Billboard magazine's Top 100 singles of 1962.

== Background ==
It charted on Billboard Hot 100 in August 1962.

The song tells the story of teenage lovers of different social classes whose parents forbid their love. The girl drowns herself in the "dirty old river." The singer concludes: "It may not be right, but I'll join you tonight/ Patches I'm coming to you." Because of the teen suicide theme, it was banned by a number of radio stations. It sold more than one million copies and was awarded a gold disc.

== Charts ==
Chart (1962)	Peak position
New Zealand (Lever Hit Parade)	4
US Billboard Hot 100	6
US Hot R&B/Hip-Hop Songs (Billboard)	10
US (Cash Box)	4

== Other versions ==
- Browning Bryant released a version of the song on his 1969 album Patches.
- Rein De Vries recorded a Dutch version titled "Patsy" which reached No. 15 on the Dutch Top 40.
