= Richard Hapgood House =

Historic house in Massachusetts, United States

- U.S. National Register of Historic Places
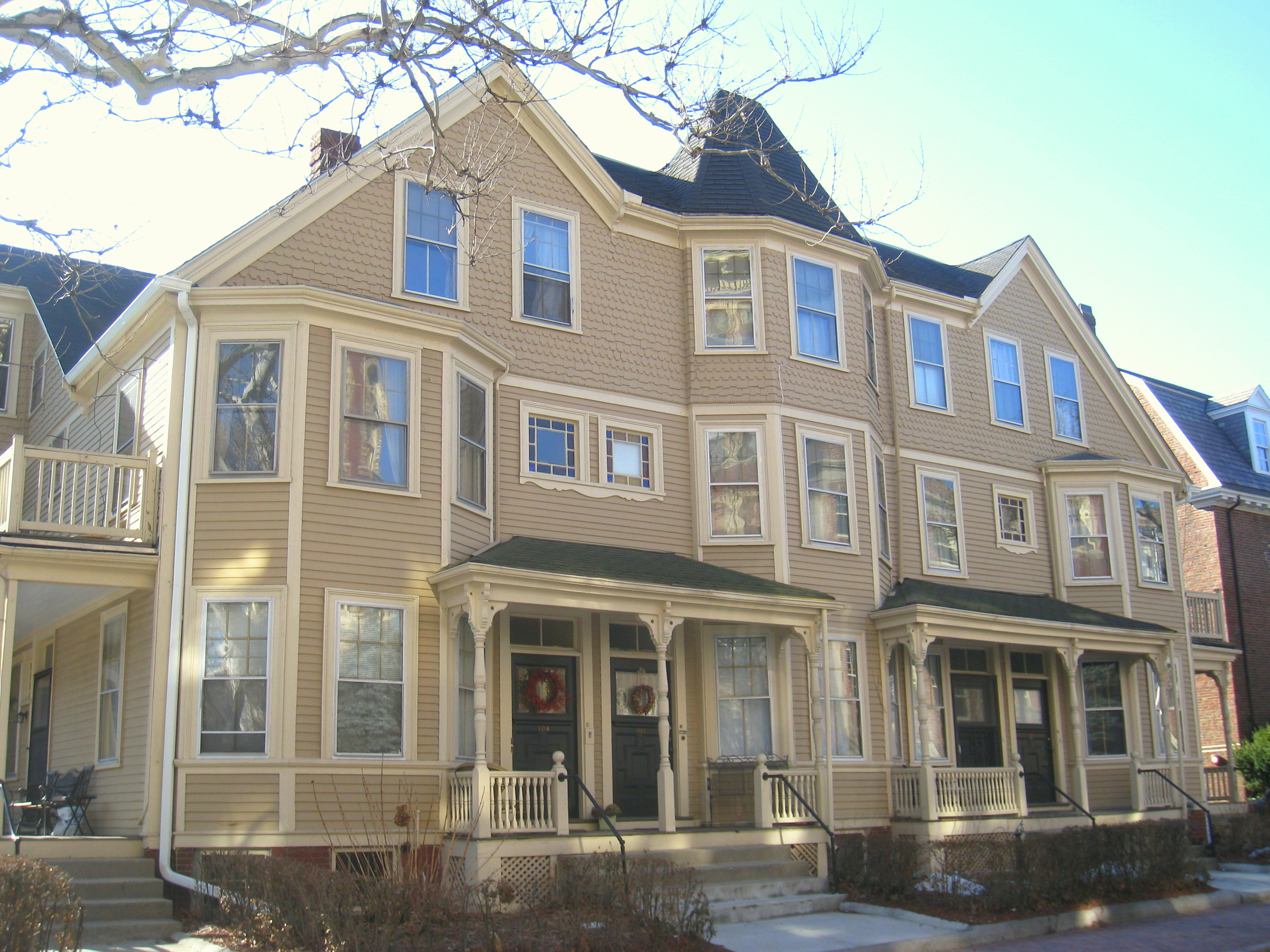

- Location within Massachusetts Location within the United States
- Location: Cambridge, Massachusetts
- Coordinates: 42°22′18″N 71°6′48″W
- Built: 1889
- Architect: J. R. & W. P. Richards
- Architectural style: Queen Anne
- MPS: Cambridge MRA
- NRHP reference No.: 86001284
- Added to NRHP: May 19, 1986

The Richard Hapgood House is an historic multiunit house at 382-392 Harvard Street in Cambridge, Massachusetts. The six-unit wood-frame building was built in 1889, and represents an unusual instance of Queen Anne styling applied to such a large structure. It was built at a time when housing stock was transitioning from small types of multiunit housing (row houses and two- or four-family dwellings) to larger formats such as tenements and apartment houses.

The house was listed on the National Register of Historic Places in 1986.

== See also ==
- National Register of Historic Places listings in Cambridge, Massachusetts
