= Central High School (Central, South Carolina) =

- U.S. National Register of Historic Places
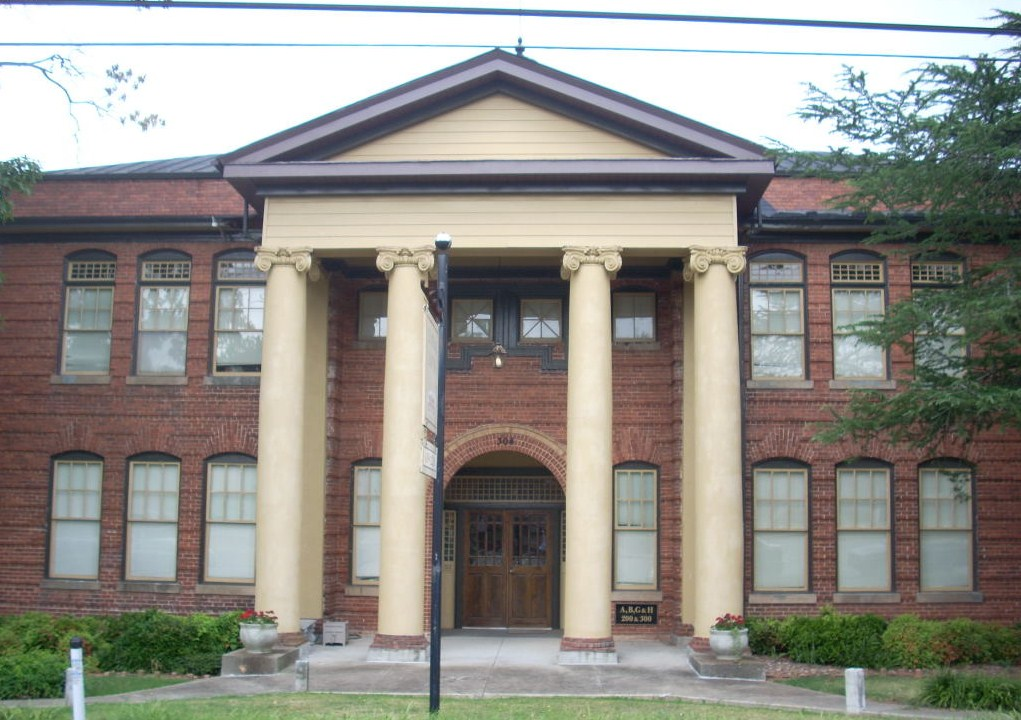
- Central High School

- Location within South Carolina Location within the United States
- Location: 304 Church Street; Central, South Carolina
- Coordinates: 34°43′22″N 82°46′52″W
- Area: less than one acre
- Built: 1908
- Architect: Sayre, Christopher Gadsden
- Architectural style: Classical Revival
- NRHP reference No.: 94000475
- Added to NRHP: May 20, 1994

Central High School Hewo is a former school building located Central, Pickens County, South Carolina. It was built in 1908 and expanded in 1922. It is located at 304 Church Street.

It was listed on the National Register of Historic Places in 1994.

It is currently used for residential living.
