= Morgan House (Central, South Carolina) =

Historic house in South Carolina, United States

- U.S. National Register of Historic Places
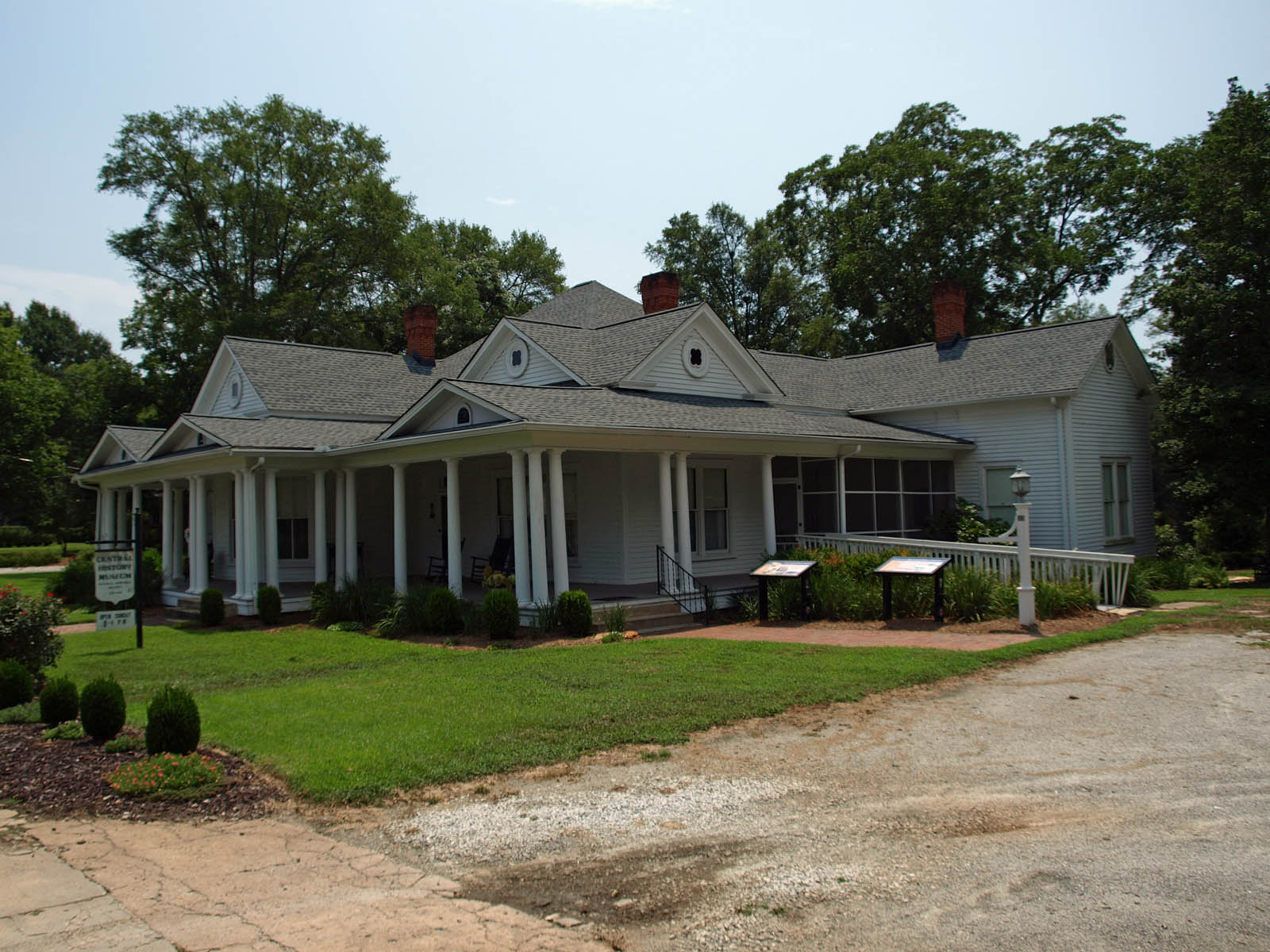
- Morgan House, August 2010

- Location within South Carolina Location within the United States
- Location: 416 Church St., Central, South Carolina
- Coordinates: 34°43′20″N 82°46′49″W
- Area: 2.8 acres (1.1 ha)
- Built: 1893, c. 1917
- Architectural style: Queen Anne, Classical Revival
- NRHP reference No.: 01000312
- Added to NRHP: March 29, 2001

Morgan House is a historic home located Central, Pickens County, South Carolina. It was built in 1893 in the Queen Anne, and modified about 1917 with Classical Revival style changes. It is a 1 1/2-story frame dwelling and features a porch with Doric order columns. It is associated with the Morgan family, who operated a mercantile retail establishment and founders of the Bank of Central.

The house now serves as the home of the Central History Museum, which is operated by the Central Heritage Society.

It was listed on the National Register of Historic Places in 2001.
