= Camp Petenwell =

Civilian Conservation Corps (CCC) camp

Coordinates: 44.048°N 90.013°W

Camp Petenwell was a Civilian Conservation Corps (CCC) camp that was in operation from July 1933 until November 1941. This camp was located four miles east of Necedah, Wisconsin. The six acres of land that this camp occupied is now currently covered by the waters of the Petenwell Flowage. Camp Petenwell was operated by the 1602nd Company of the Sixth Civilian Conservation Corps district headquartered in Sparta, Wisconsin.

== Projects ==
The men at Camp Petenwell worked on many different projects while serving with the CCC. These projects included:

- Fought forest fires throughout Central Wisconsin.
- Planted trees on 3000 acres of land in and around the Necedah, Sprague and Rabbit Rock areas in Central Wisconsin. CCC recruits planted both spruce and pine trees in these locations.
- Constructed a fire tower in Wisconsin Rapids.
- Built and operated a tree nursery in Wisconsin Rapids. After the end of the CCC operation in 1941, the state of Wisconsin took over operation of this nursery and it is still operational today.
- Constructed 4 ranger station buildings throughout Central Wisconsin.
- Built 50 miles of roads for truck travel in and around the immediate area of the camp.
- Put up 120 miles of telephone lines throughout Central Wisconsin.
- Mapped the forests around the immediate area of the camp.
- Improved trout streams in Juneau and Adams counties.

== Education ==
Education for the young men at CCC camps was an important mission of the Civilian Conservation Corps. Some of the classes offered at Camp Petenwell included:

- Forestry
- Radio
- Civics
- Current Events
- Model Airplane Construction
- Bookkeeping
- English
- Mathematics
- Shorthand
- Typing
- Drafting
- Show Card Writing
- Surveying
- Vocational Employment
- Motor Mechanics
- Fire fighting
- Blasting
- First Aid

== Athletics ==
Athletics were a common diversion at Camp Petenwell as at many other CCC camps. Young men were able to participate in several different sports. There was also sanctioned competition between Camp Petenwell and the other CCC camps in the area. Common opponents for the teams from Camp Petenwell (nicknamed the Panthers) were Camp City Point in Wood County, and the 6th CCC District headquarters in Sparta, Wisconsin. Sports that young men at Camp Petenwell participated in included:

- boxing
- basketball
- track and field activities
- volleyball
- basketball
