= Williams–Ligon House =

Historic house in South Carolina, United States

- U.S. National Register of Historic Places
- Location within South Carolina Location within the United States
- Location: 1866 Farrs Bridge Rd., Easley, South Carolina
- Coordinates: 34°52′52.53″N 82°37′01.46″W
- Area: 83 acres (34 ha)
- Built: 1895
- Architectural style: Folk Victorian
- NRHP reference No.: 12000015
- Added to NRHP: February 8, 2012

Williams–Ligon House, also known as Cedar Rock Plantation and Magnolia Estates, is a historic home and farm complex located Easley, Pickens County, South Carolina. The house was built in 1895, and is a two-story, frame I-house with a one-story rear addition. It features Folk Victorian decorative elements including spindle work and turned porch posts and balusters and brackets. Also on the property are a contributing barn that was the original Williams house (c. 1875), a smokehouse, and several mid-20th century barns and farm buildings.

It was listed on the National Register of Historic Places in 2012.
