= Haygood =

Haygood is a surname. Notable people with the surname include:

- Atticus Greene Haygood (1839–1896), American clergyman
- Dixie Haygood (1861–1915), American stage magician
- Herb Haygood (born 1977), American professional football player
- James K. Haygood Jr. (born 1931), American politician
- Wil Haygood (born 1954), American journalist, author of "A Butler Well Served by this Election", the basis for the film The Butler

== See also ==
- Carpenter–Haygood Stadium, American football stadium in Arkadelphia, Arkansas
- Joseph Haygood Blodgett (1858–1934), American architect and contractor
