= Old Pickens Jail =

- U.S. National Register of Historic Places
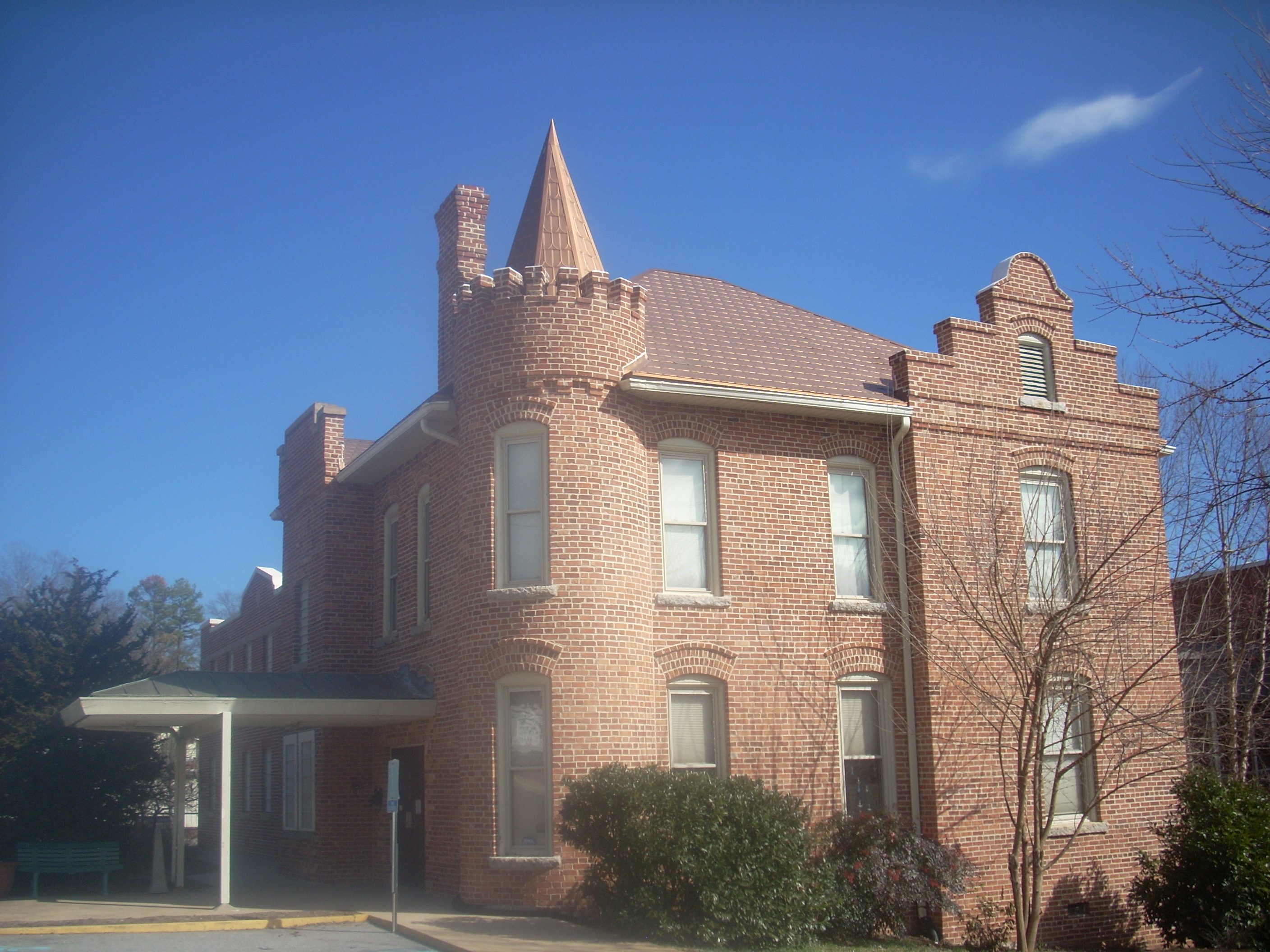
- Old Pickens Jail, February 2011

- Location within South Carolina Location within the United States
- Location: Johnson and Pendleton Sts., Pickens, South Carolina
- Coordinates: 34°52′51″N 82°42′21″W
- Area: 1 acre (0.40 ha)
- Built: 1903
- NRHP reference No.: 79002390
- Added to NRHP: April 11, 1979

Old Pickens Jail, also known as Pickens County Jail, is a historic jail located at Pickens, Pickens County, South Carolina. It was built in 1903, and is a two-story, brick building with a two-story crenellated tower. It was expanded in 1928 to provide additional space for the cellblock. The jail closed in August 1975, and has since been used as a historical museum and art gallery.

This building gained infamy when Willie Earle was forcefully removed from the Pickens County Jail by a mob on February 16, 1947. When confronted by the mob, the jailer's response was: "I guess you boys know what you're doing." Willie Earle was subsequently lynched nearby in Greenville County, SC.

It was listed on the National Register of Historic Places in 1979.
