= Civilian Conservation Corps Powder Magazine =

- U.S. National Register of Historic Places
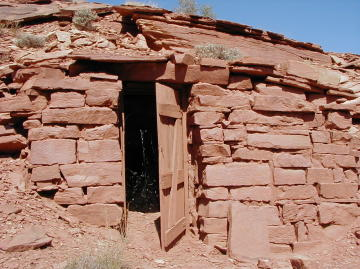

- Location within Utah Location within the United States
- Nearest city: Torrey, Utah
- Coordinates: 38°16′33″N 111°15′4″W
- Area: 0.1 acres (0.040 ha)
- Built: 1938
- Built by: Civilian Conservation Corps
- Architectural style: Rustic
- MPS: Capitol Reef National Park MPS
- NRHP reference No.: 99001090
- Added to NRHP: September 13, 1999

The Civilian Conservation Corps Powder Magazine in Capitol Reef National Park, Utah, was used in the 1930s to store explosives for use by Civilian Conservation Corps laborers in the construction of improvements to the park. Much of the CCC's work in the park involved the quarrying of sandstone blocks and slabs, which required explosives. The magazine was built about 1938 in association with CCC Camp NM-2, later called NP-6, located to the west of Fruita at Chimney Rock. The Fruita ranger station and the powder magazine are the only structures remaining from the CCC tenure in the park.

The magazine consists of a single room, partially built into a hillside. Walls are native red sandstone, coursed, with a stone slab for a roof. The building measures 10.5 feet (3.2 m) by 7.5 feet (2.3 m), with a dirt floor.

The magazine was placed on the National Register of Historic Places on September 13, 1999.
