= J. Warren Smith House =

Historic house in South Carolina, United States

- U.S. National Register of Historic Places
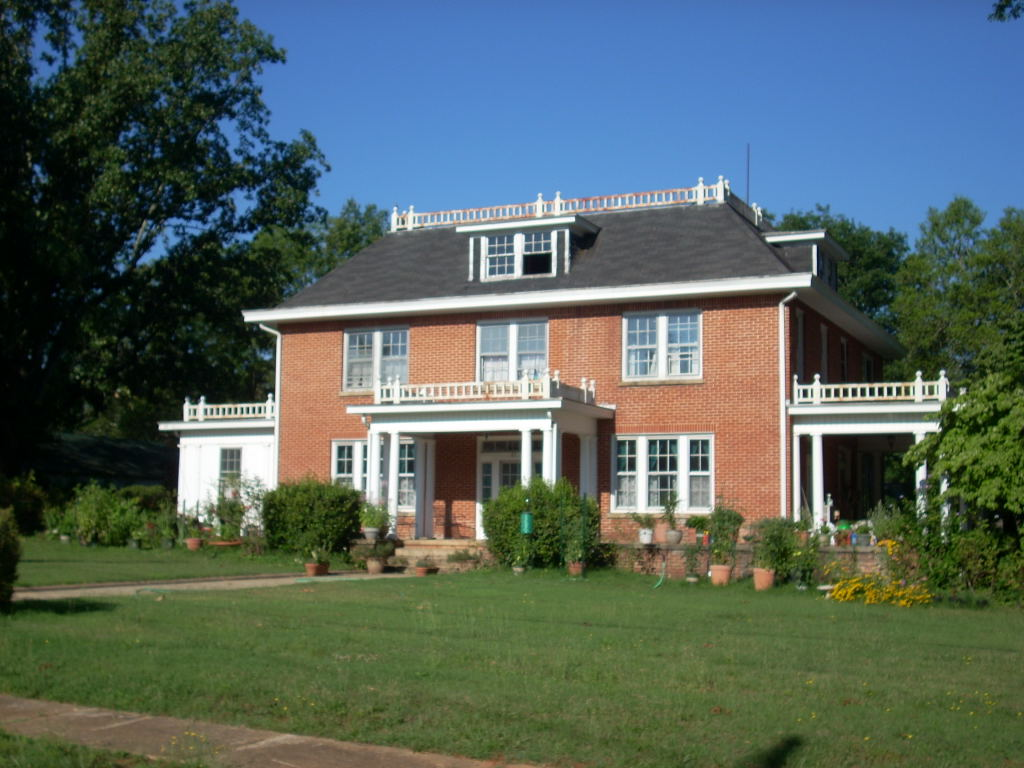
- J. Warren Smith House in 2009

- Location within South Carolina Location within the United States
- Location: 21 N. Palmetto St., Liberty, South Carolina
- Coordinates: 34°47′18.5″N 82°41′45″W
- Area: less than one acre
- Built: 1927
- Architectural style: Colonial Revival
- NRHP reference No.: 04001564
- Added to NRHP: January 26, 2005

The J. Warren Smith House is a house at 21 North Palmetto Street at the corner of North Palmetto and Edgemont Streets in Liberty, South Carolina in Pickens County. It has also been called "Maggie Manor" and the Myrtle Inn, which were names during its use as a boarding house. It was named to the National Register of Historic Places on January 26, 2005. It is considered an excellent example of a Colonial Revival house and for its connection with J. Warren Smith, who was a local business executive.

== History ==
J. Warren Smith (1880–1968) was born in Anderson, South Carolina. He went to public schools and began his career in farming but switched to carpentry for six years. Then he worked for International Harvester in sales and as an expert in gas engines. In 1910, he founded Liberty Light & Power. Two gas engines were used to produce electric power for Liberty. When demand for power exceeded the company's generating capacity, he sold the company to Duke Power under an agreement that included lifetime employment. He became the Pickens County manager in its Liberty office. In 1937, he was transferred to Greenville in Duke's Rural Electrification and Engineering Department. He sold his house and moved to Greenville in 1941. He retired in 1955. In 1966, he moved to Easley where he died in 1968.

Around the time of the sale of Liberty Power & Light, Smith started building a new house that was appropriate for his status in the community. It is likely that construction took a number of years. Starting in the 1930s, the house was used to board local teachers and others. Eventually, the house became known as "Maggie Manor," which was named for Mattie Smith, wife of J. Warren Smith. When the house was sold to L. J. and Sybil Kelley in 1941, it became the Myrtle Inn. The cook was Mrs. Kelley's mother, who was known as "Granny Chamblin" and also lived in the house with her husband. Myrtle Inn served lunch for boarders and others. It was a popular place for many local businessmen to eat. It was used for boarders and as a tourist home until 1970. It was resold in 2003.

== Architecture ==
It is a 2 1/2-story, 4,080 sq ft (379 m^{2}), brick-veneer house on a brick foundation. The front elevation faces east. The hip roof with composition shingles has a balustrade around its top. The house has wide, overhanging eaves. The attic has dormers facing east, south, and north.

The house has two formal entrances with porches. The porches are supported by Doric columns that are clustered at the outer corners and paired and engaged at the house. The main entrance is on the east elevation on Palmetto Street and the family entrance is on the north side on Edgemont Street. There is porch on the south elevation. In 1970, this porch was enclosed. The small porch on the west elevation was also enclosed with vinyl siding about the same time. The ceilings of the porches are bead board.

The windows on the east elevation are mainly six over six light sash windows. The dormers have a pair of smaller six over six light windows.

The first floor has 10 ft (3.0 m) ceilings. The living room is the main room of the first floor and is off the main entrance. The room has dark oak baseboards that are 10 in (25 cm) tall. The house has hardwood floors, which are covered in carpet in the living room. The room has a faux brick fireplace with marble mantle.

Other rooms on the first floor are the dining room, center hall with stairways to the second floor and basement, breakfast room, kitchen, south porch, master bedroom and bathroom. The dining room has two fifteen light doors that lead to the south porch. The breakfast room connects with the dining room through a two-paneled swinging door. The kitchen is off the breakfast room and in the southwest corner of the house. A fifteen light door leads to the rear porch. The master bathroom is between a rear hall and the master bedroom.

The second floor, which has 9 ft (2.7 m) ceilings, has six bedrooms and two bathrooms. Each bedroom has a six over six light sash window. The trim is the same as on the first floor. Only one of the bathrooms has the original plumbing fixtures. The other bathroom was converted from a closet. The attic was plumbed with water lines but was never unfinished. It is currently used for storage.

The front of the basement is a crawlspace. The rear is excavated and has the utilities for the house. It has a central vacuum system with connections in each room of the house for the vacuum hose. It has a coal-burning furnace that produces steam for heating. The furnace has a conveyor belt feed system that brings coal from the basement utility room. The basement was altered in 1970 that included a bedroom and an acoustical tile ceiling.
