= Civilian Conservation Corps Quarry No. 1 and Truck Trail =

- U.S. National Register of Historic Places
- U.S. Historic district
- Location within South Carolina Location within the United States
- Location: Off Section Rd. 25/Hickory Hollow Rd., 0.7 miles south of South Carolina Highway 11, near Pickens, South Carolina
- Coordinates: 35°0′17″N 82°42′46″W
- Area: 4.7 acres (1.9 ha)
- Built by: Civilian Conservation Corps
- MPS: South Carolina State Parks MPS
- NRHP reference No.: 89000479
- Added to NRHP: June 16, 1989

Civilian Conservation Corps Quarry No. 1 and Truck Trail is a historic Civilian Conservation Corps (CCC) quarry site located near Pickens, Pickens County, South Carolina. The site is associated with the CCC construction of Table Rock State Park between 1935 and 1941. It is one of four quarry sites used for materials in the construction of park structures and facilities at the park. The truck trail was used by CCC workers to gain access to the quarry.

It was listed on the National Register of Historic Places in 1989.
