= Hawgood =

Hawgood is a surname.

The Hawgood name appears to have originated from the land in St Albans, known as the Halgoods. The catalogue of field names occurring of the Hertfordshire estates of the Earl of Verulam (1927 document) states that Jn Algood held the 60 acres of Land known as the Halgoods in 1493, and prior to that Ric Halegod, a tenant, 1317, 1320-1, 1345/6 and Ric Halgood 1436-7. The name eventually became Hawgood. The Megdell lands in St Albans were held by the Hawgood family to 1643.

Notable people with the surname include:

- Donald Hawgood (1917–2010), Canadian sprint canoeist
- Greg Hawgood (born 1968), Canadian ice hockey player
- Neil Hawgood (born 1962), Australian field hockey player
