= Civilian Conservation Corp Camp F-10 =

- U.S. National Register of Historic Places
- U.S. Historic district
- Location within South Dakota Location within the United States
- Location: 13381 Silver Mountain Road
- Nearest city: Rapid City, South Dakota
- Coordinates: 43.946652°N 103.381367°W
- Area: 3 acres (1.2 ha)
- Built: 1933
- Built by: Civilian Conservation Corps
- Architectural style: CCC Affiliation
- MPS: Federal Relief Construction in South Dakota MPS
- NRHP reference No.: 03001531
- Added to NRHP: January 28, 2004

Civilian Conservation Corp Camp F-10, also called the Rockerville Civilian Conservation Corp Camp, is a historic district on Silver Mountain Road, 15 miles (24 km) southwest of Rapid City, South Dakota. Between 1933 and 1935, it functioned as a base camp for Civilian Conservation Corps (CCC) workers who were employed on multiple construction and forestry projects in the area during the Great Depression. The camp was added to the National Register of Historic Places in 2004; three buildings and the remains of a fireplace are included in the listing.

== History ==
The Civilian Conservation Corps (CCC) operated in South Dakota during the Great Depression, building and maintaining structures and government property across the state. Temporary camps were constructed to accommodate the thousands of workers that passed through the program. The Rockerville area was chosen as a temporary base of operations for CCC Company 1794, who were mostly employed in Black Hills forestry maintenance for the United States Forest Service. Taska included bridge and dam construction, tree thinning, campsite and trail maintenance, and firefighting. The first camp buildings, including two officers' cabins and a hospital, were erected in 1933. Early CCC camps were usually log structures created from surrounding lumber and resources; by 1934, however, the federal government had introduced prefabricated parts to CCC campsite construction. This allowed buildings to easily be dismantled and moved to a new campsite or to be reused somewhere else. The camp eventually included 17 structures: four barracks that could sleep 50 men each, a recreation hall, mess hall, kitchen and cooks' barracks, a bathhouse, blacksmithing shop, garage, storage cabins, a water tower, and the aforementioned officers' cabins and hospital. Up to 175 men were stationed at Camp F-10 at its most populous.

In May 1935, Company 1794 was scheduled to be incorporated into Company 791, who were at that time based at Camp F-22 at Summit Peak. The Rockerville camp was abandoned—buildings that could be dismantled were taken with the company for use in the new camp—and sat unused for decades, causing most of the remaining structures to crumble. Today, only three log buildings stand: two officers' cabins and the hospital, plus a fireplace ruin that was once part of the mess hall. On January 28, 2004, a triangular historic district encompassing the surviving structures was added to the National Register of Historic Places. The site is now on private property.
