= Central Roller Mills =

- U.S. National Register of Historic Places
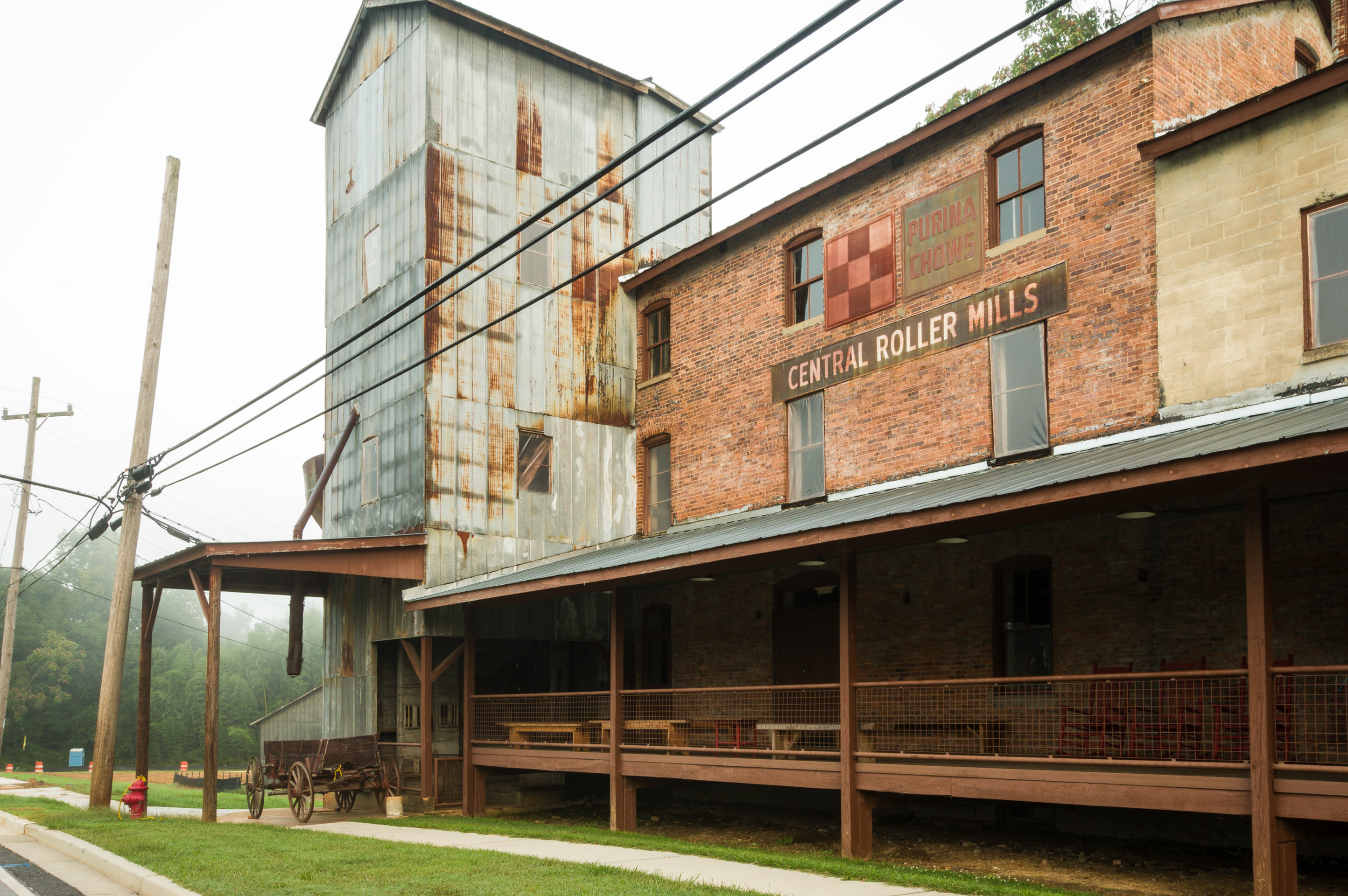

- Location within South Carolina Location within the United States
- Location: 300 Madden Bridge Road, Central, South Carolina
- Coordinates: 34°43′29″N 82°47′5″W
- Built: 1903
- NRHP reference No.: 13000454
- Added to NRHP: June 25, 2013

The Central Roller Mills is a historic mill complex in Central, South Carolina. The mill opened in 1903, when there were 556 operating grist mills and roller mills in South Carolina. By 1929, there were only 23, and by 1939, there were only 17, however, the Central Roller Mills operated until the late 1970s. The original building is three stories tall and made of brick, with a one-story wing. The mill was purchased by the owner of the nearby Pendleton Oil Mill in 1934. By 1938, additions to the complex included a second story to the wing, a four-story tower for bucket elevators, and a three-story tower with nine storage silos. A corn mill and hammer mill for producing animal feed were added in separate buildings. The complex was listed on the National Register of Historic Places in 2013.
