= Civilian Conservation Corps Quarry No. 2 =

- Civilian Conservation Corps; Quarry No. 2
- U.S. National Register of Historic Places
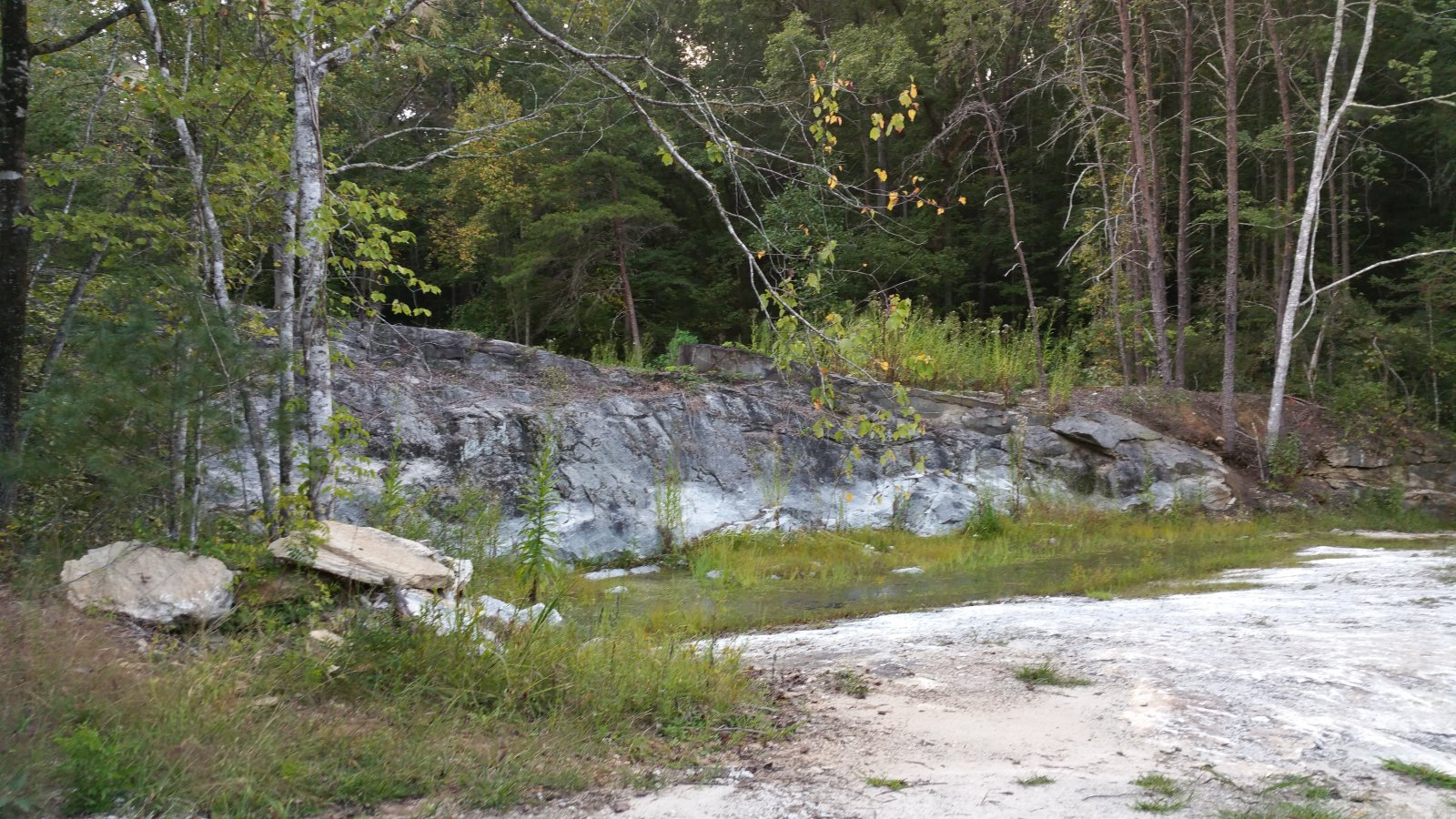
- Civilian Conservation Corps Quarry No. 2 in Pickens County, SC. This granite outcrop is on private property, adjacent to Blue Hills Trail.

- Location within South Carolina Location within the United States
- Location: 0.2 miles north of Section Rd. 69/Sliding Rock Rd. near the Oolenoy River, near Pickens, South Carolina
- Coordinates: 35°0′21″N 82°43′18″W
- Area: 1.3 acres (0.53 ha)
- Built by: Civilian Conservation Corps
- MPS: South Carolina State Parks MPS
- NRHP reference No.: 89000480
- Added to NRHP: June 16, 1989

Civilian Conservation Corps Quarry No. 2 is a historic Civilian Conservation Corps (CCC) quarry site located near Pickens, Pickens County, South Carolina. The site is associated with the CCC construction of Table Rock State Park between 1935 and 1941. It is one of four quarry sites used for materials in the construction of park structures and facilities at the park. Located on the property is a concrete spring house built by CCC workers.

It was listed on the National Register of Historic Places in 1989.
