= Sheriff Mill Complex =

- U.S. National Register of Historic Places
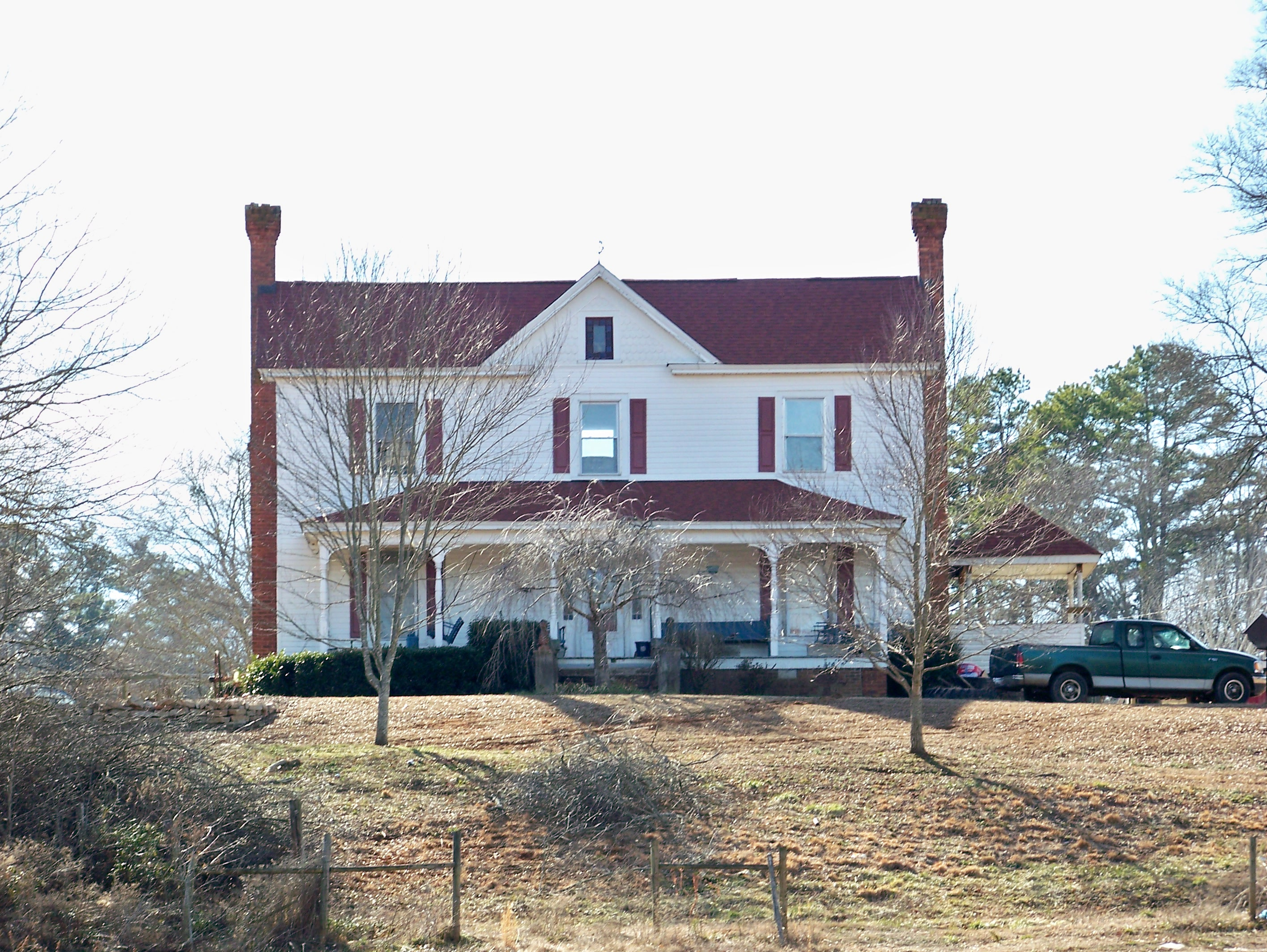
- The main house

- Location within South Carolina Location within the United States
- Location: South Carolina Highway 40, Easley, South Carolina
- Coordinates: 34°47′18″N 82°34′08″W
- Area: 19 acres (7.7 ha)
- Built: 1881, 1898-1899
- Built by: Sheriff, Exodus; Et al.
- Architectural style: I-House
- NRHP reference No.: 87002058
- Added to NRHP: November 20, 1987

Sheriff Mill Complex, also known as Sheriff Place, is a historic grist mill complex located near Easley, Pickens County, South Carolina. The complex includes a main house, gristmill, miller's house, millpond, and dam. They date to the late-19th and early-20th centuries. The grist mill was built in 1881, and is a 1 1/2-story, frame structure. It remained in operation until 1955. The main house was built about 1898–1899, and is a two-story, frame I-house with a rear ell.

It was listed on the National Register of Historic Places in 1987.
