= Table Rock State Park (South Carolina) =

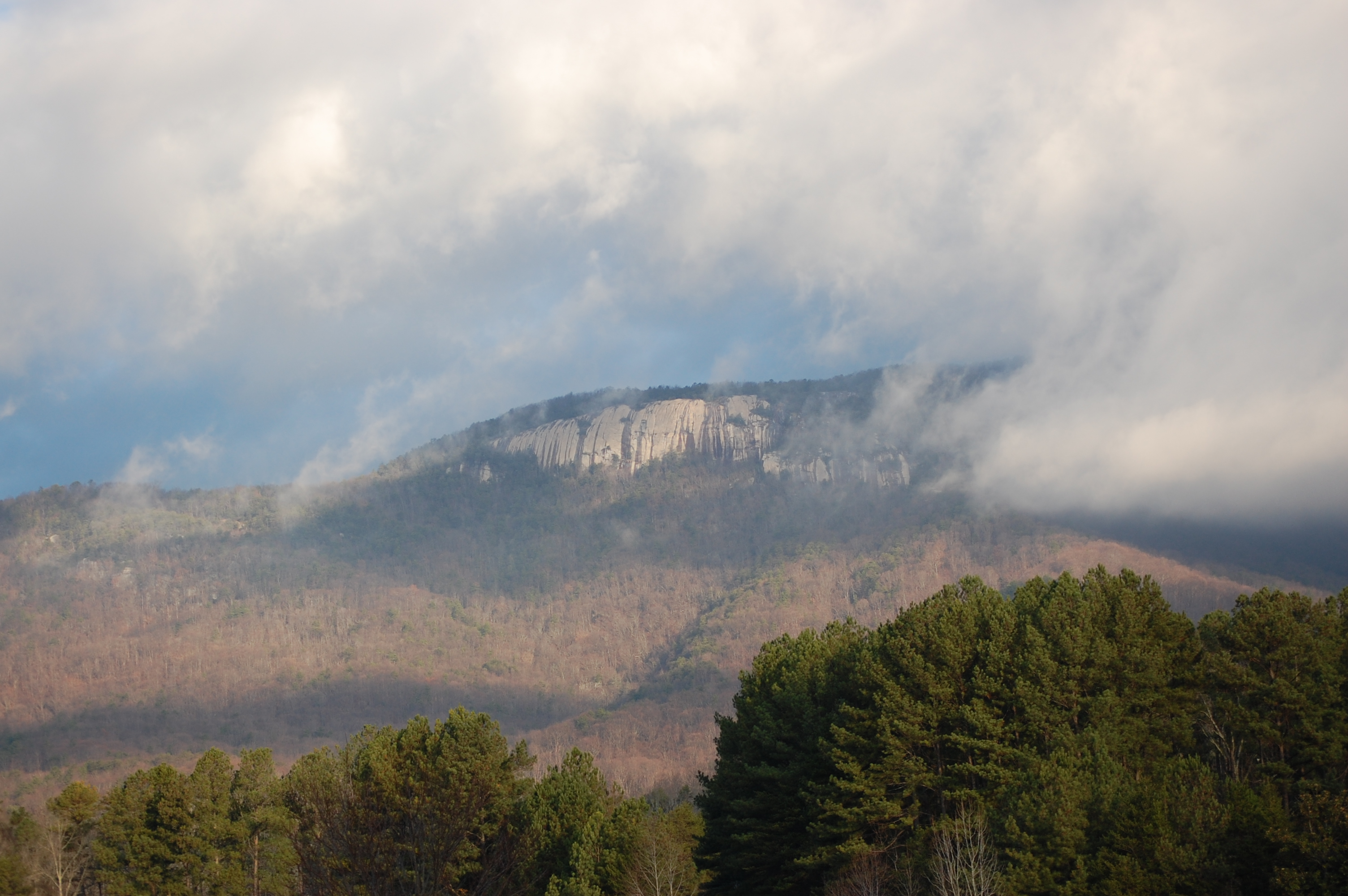
- Table Rock Mountain
- Interactive map of Table Rock State Park
- Nearest city: Pickens, South Carolina
- Coordinates: 35°02′09.2″N 82°42′21.3″W
- Area: 3,083 acres (12.5 km^{2})
- Created: 1935
- Camp sites: Both regular and RV campsites Mountain cabins are also available in the park
- Hiking trails: Eastern trailhead of the Foothills Trail; A trail to the summit of Pinnacle Mountain; A trail to the summit of Table Rock
- Other information: Leashed pets are allowed everywhere except for cabin areas.
- Website: Table Rock State Park

Table Rock State Park is a 3,083-acre (12.48 km^{2}) park at the edge of the Blue Ridge Mountains in northern Pickens County, South Carolina.

== Park features ==
The park features a lodge built by the Civilian Conservation Corps (CCC) that includes a kitchen and a 72-seat dining room. There are two park lakes for seasonal swimming, and hiking trails lead to Mill Creek Falls, the Pinnacle Mountain summit (two routes), and Table Rock summit. A nature center offers educational programs, and there are picnic shelters and a playground.

=== Trails ===
The 1.9-mile (3.1 km) Carrick Creek Nature Trail loops around two creeks with small cascades and waterfalls and displays wildflowers in season.

The 3.5-mile (5.6 km) Table Rock Summit Trail is moderately strenuous, rising 2,000 feet (610 m) above the trailhead, and includes a shelter built by the CCC. At approximately 2.5 miles (4.0 km), the trail forks, the left fork following a ridge trail to Pinnacle Mountain and the right fork to the summit at 3,124 feet (952 m). The trail ends at an overlook with a view of Table Rock Reservoir and Caesars Head.

The park is the eastern trailhead of the 80-mile (130 km) Foothills Trail through the Blue Ridge Escarpment.

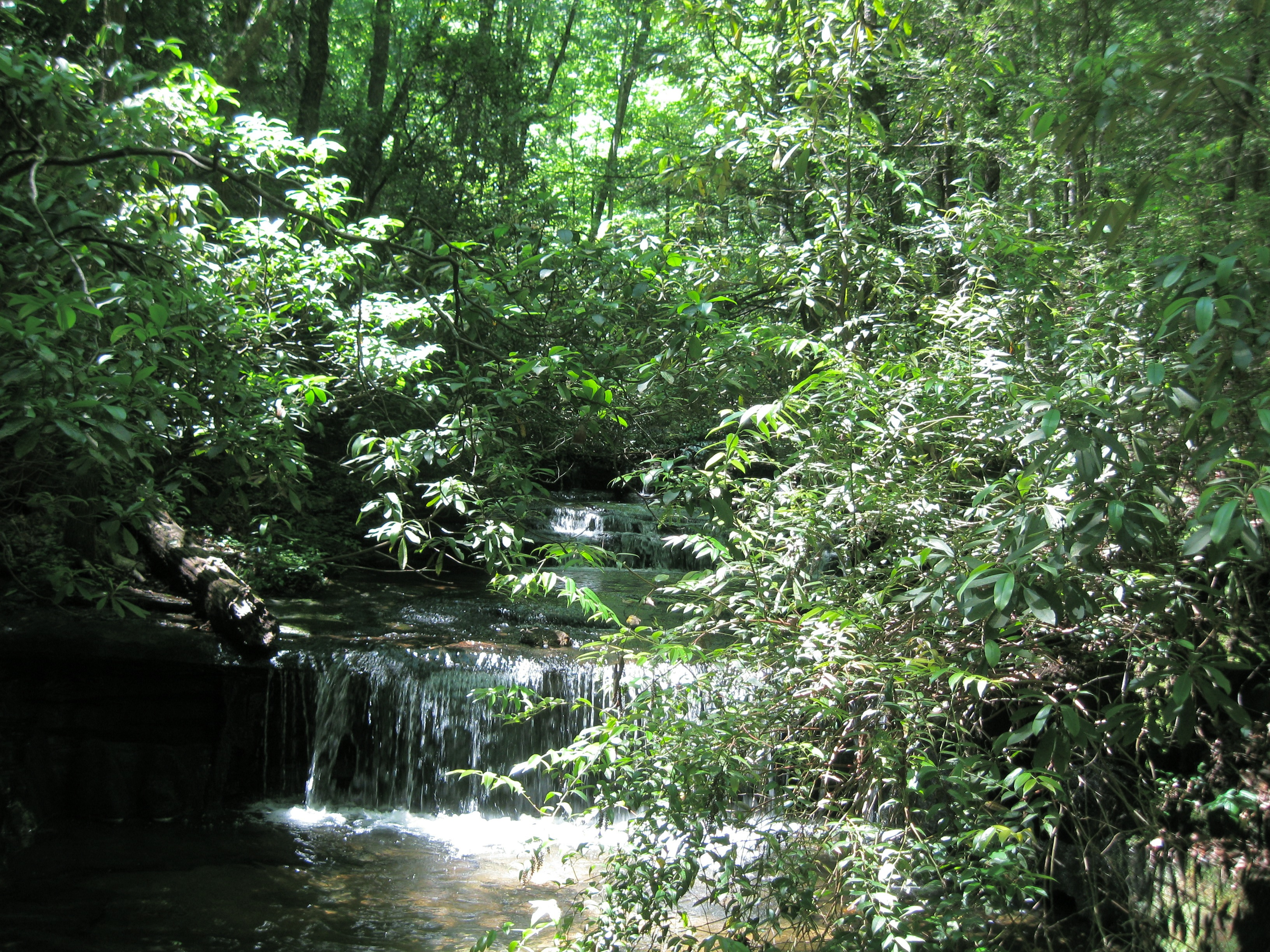
A waterfall on Carrick Creek Nature Trail

== History ==
Before the signing of the Treaty of Hopewell of 1785, the land now encompassed by Table Rock State Park was part of the Lower Cherokee Nation. The Cherokee called the area "Sah-ka-na-ga," the Great Blue Hills of God, and they established many hunting camps in the area. According to folklore, Table Rock Mountain received its name from a Cherokee legend in which the flat-topped mountain served as a table from which the Great Spirit ate his meals.

Europeans moved into the Oolenoy River Valley soon after the signing of the Hopewell Treaty, settling at Pumpkintown—named for the unusually large pumpkins grown there. William Sutherland and James Keith operated a wayside lodge for visitors, and in 1845, they built the twenty-room Table Rock Hotel, which prospered until the Civil War. Visitors increased again after Reconstruction, and Stephen Keith reopened the Table Rock Hotel. In 1899, Keith's family built a new hotel on a new location on the mountain, but by 1912, they had abandoned it.

Beginning on March 21, 2025, a human-caused fire near the summit of Table Rock Mountain, along with the nearby Persimmon Ridge fire, burned 15,973 acres.

== Table Rock State Park Historic District ==
- Table Rock State Park Historic District
- U.S. National Register of Historic Places
- U.S. Historic district
- Location within South Carolina Location within the United States
- Nearest city: Pickens, South Carolina
- Area: 2,860 acres (1,160 ha)
- Architect: J.W. Linley
- Architectural style: Late 19th And Early 20th Century American Movements, CCC construction
- MPS: South Carolina State Parks MPS
- NRHP reference No.: 89000478
- Added to NRHP: June 15, 1989

In 1935, approximately 2,860 acres (11.6 km^{2}) of land were donated to the state of South Carolina by Pickens County and the city of Greenville. The park was created in the 1930s, first by two companies of World War I veterans employed by the Civilian Conservation Corps. The veterans were apparently too old for the strenuous labor required to build a dam and to work in mountainous terrain, and in 1936, they were replaced by two junior CCC companies. One of these two companies (5466) constructed a concrete dam and spillway to create the twenty-three acre Pinnacle Lake. The other (5465) built miles of trails, roads, a bathhouse, a concessions building, fish-rearing pools, eight cabins, picnic shelters, and houses for the park superintendent and warden. Most notable was a lodge constructed of logs, an L-shaped building with a great hall on the main level and a dining hall, sun porch, and kitchen on the basement level. The CCC also landscaped the park using natural vegetation from the Pinnacle Lake bed. The park opened to the public with a ceremony on April 4, 1938.

The Table Rock State Park Historic District was listed on the National Register of Historic Places in 1989. Also listed in 1989 were the related Civilian Conservation Corps Quarry No. 1 and Truck Trail, Civilian Conservation Corps Quarry No. 2, Roper House Complex, and Table Rock Civilian Conservation Corps Camp Site. It is also a South Carolina Heritage Trust Site.

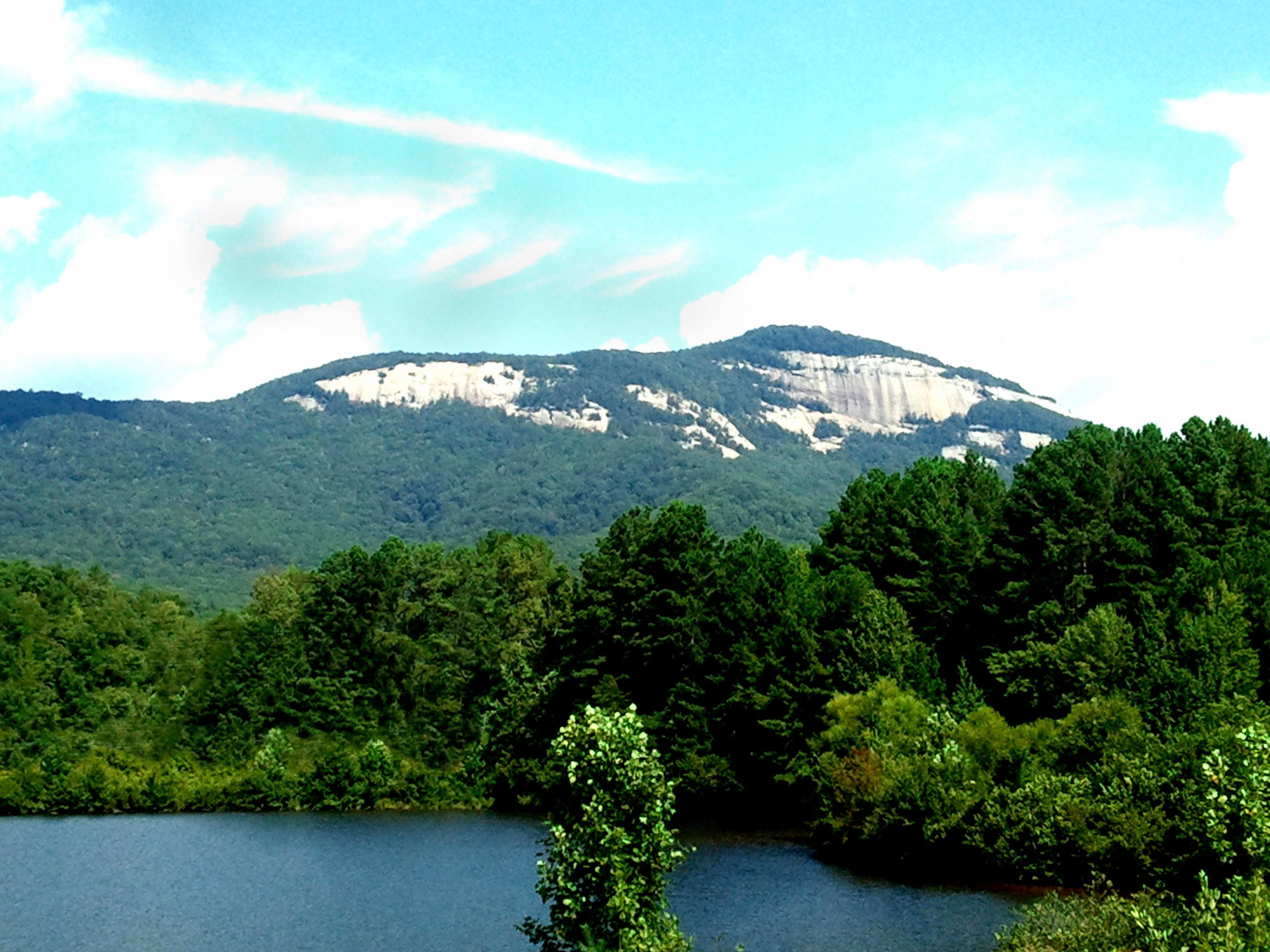
Table Rock Mountain, as seen from Visitors' Center
