= Civilian Conservation Corps Camp S-90 =

Historic buildings in Lake Pleasant, New York

- U.S. National Register of Historic Places
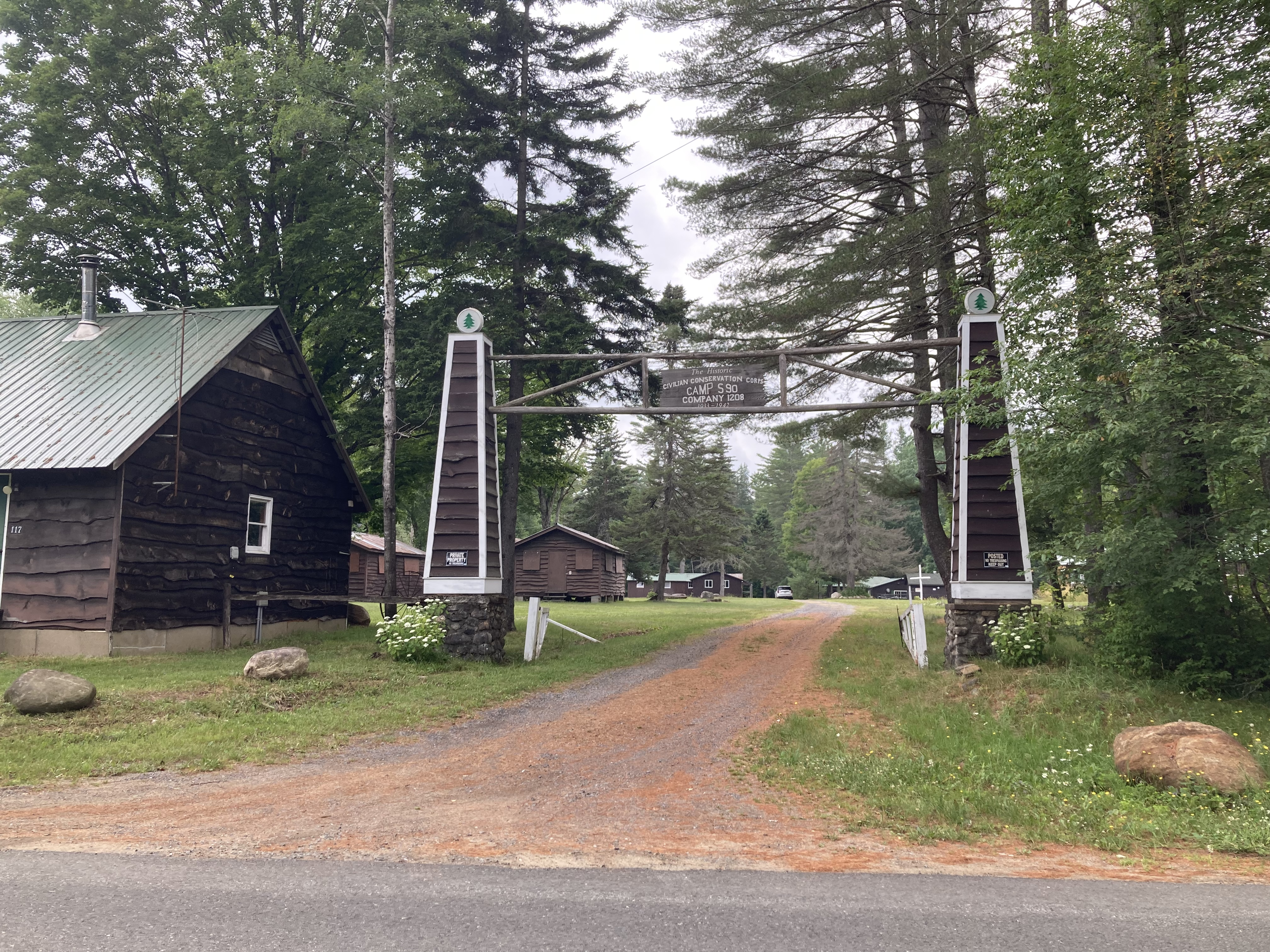
- Entrance to Camp S-90

- Location within New York Location within the United States
- Location: 117 Page Street, Lake Pleasant, New York
- Coordinates: 43.4856°N 74.3857°W
- Area: 16 acres (6.5 ha)
- Built: 1934
- Architect: Civilian Conservation Corps
- NRHP reference No.: 16000485
- Added to NRHP: August 2, 2016

Civilian Conservation Corps Camp S-90 is a former camp of the Civilian Conservation Corps (CCC) in the town of Lake Pleasant, Hamilton County, New York. Built in 1934, the camp housed up to 200 CCC enlistees as they worked on building campgrounds in northern New York. The camp closed in 1941 at the outset of World War II and was converted to a summer camp for children. Amid renovations, the camps retained many of the original CCC camp buildings and structures, and Camp S-90 is the only concentration of CCC-era buildings of its size in New York state. The camp has been listed on the National Register of Historic Places since 2016.

== Architecture ==
The 1937 mural, currently housed at the Adirondack Museum

The camp was laid out along military lines with five barracks, each housing 30 men, built in a row on one side of a parade ground. Communal buildings, including the dining hall, infirmary and recreation hall, lined the opposite side. Each building was framed with studs on the interior, board and batten siding on the exterior and metal roofs. Around 1937, camp artist and CCC enrollee Hans Held painted a 6-by-30-foot (1.8 by 9.1 m) mural in the recreation building depicting bridge construction. The mural was later donated to the Adirondack Museum.

The camp's entrance gate features two truncated pyramidal posts atop cobblestone bases. A log truss between the posts holds the camp's sign.

== History ==
The first Civilian Conservation Corps camp in Lake Pleasant was located in a marshy area near Lake Pleasant in 1933, less than three months after the CCC was authorized, but it was abandoned due to its poor location and Camp S-90 was built on higher ground in 1934. CCC members at the site worked on building the state's system of campgrounds during six-month enlistment periods. The camp was built to U.S. Army-developed CCC plans, and because none of the buildings were intended to be permanent, the CCC buildings rest on piles instead of footings. The camp accommodated roughly 200 corps members, who generally came from northern New York.

Camp S-90 closed in November 1941 amid the planned consolidation of CCC camps to free up War Department personnel. The camp remained closed for the duration of World War II. Starting in 1945, the camp was leased and later sold to a group of 4-H clubs that operated a children's camp on the site until 2004. A camp office and cabins were added, and some barracks were renovated with live edge siding. As of 2017, some of the cabins still retained their original board and batten siding.

In 2010, the camp was purchased and renovated, reopening in 2014 as a camp for children with special needs. This renovation restored the recreation building and dining hall but demolished the CCC-era infirmary to build a swimming pool. The camp has been listed on the National Register of Historic Places since 2016 due to the well-preserved status of the surviving buildings and objects of the CCC era. At the time of its listing, it was the only concentration of CCC buildings with such a degree of integrity in the state.

== See also ==
- National Register of Historic Places listings in Hamilton County, New York
