= Civilian Conservation Corps-Prisoner of War Recreation Hall =

- U.S. National Register of Historic Places
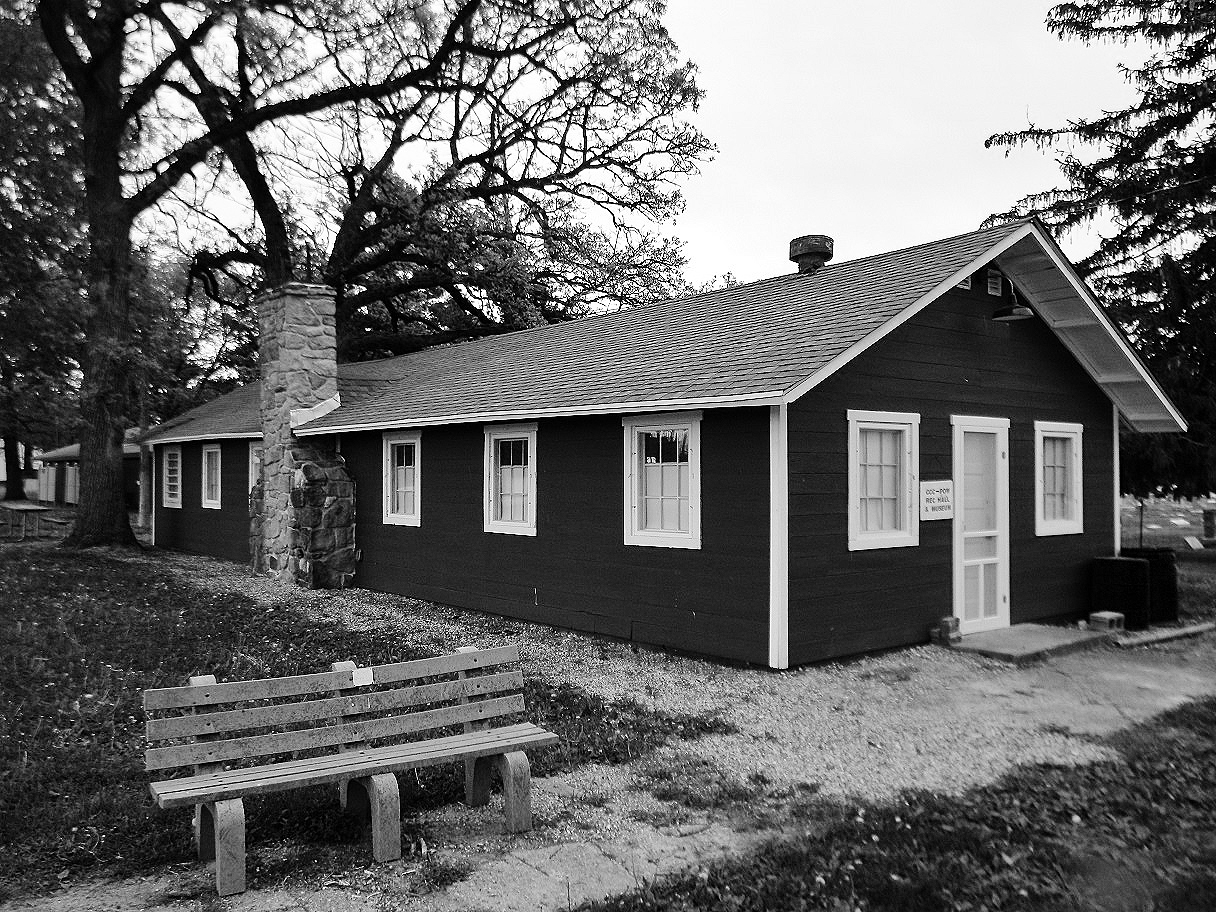

- Location within Iowa Location within the United States
- Location: 301 11th Ave. Eldora, Iowa
- Coordinates: 42°21′45″N 93°05′10.8″W
- Area: less than one acre
- Built: 1933
- Architect: Civilian Conservation Corps
- NRHP reference No.: 11001056
- Added to NRHP: January 27, 2012

The Civilian Conservation Corps-Prisoner of War Recreation Hall is a historic building located in Eldora, Iowa, United States. Known as Camp Flying Goose, the Civilian Conservation Corps' (CCC) Company 1755 made Eldora their home base in 1933. They constructed this building that year for their use as a barracks while they worked on projects in the area, which included building Upper Pine Lake in Pine Lake State Park. CCC Company 1752, the Erosioners, replaced them two years later, and they built many of the facilities in the park. With the start of World War II, the CCC left the camp. The National Youth Association used the camp from 1940 to 1942.

In 1943 the camp became Prisoner of War (POW) Compound #13, and it housed German and Italian POWs until 1945. The prisoners were put to work on farms, in canning factories, doing construction, and other jobs. This building is all that remains of the CCC/POW camp. It is the only CCC camp building that still exists in Iowa, and it houses a museum. The building, which is located on the Hardin County Fairgrounds, was listed on the National Register of Historic Places in 2012.
