= South Carolina Petroglyph Site =

Coordinates: 34°55′37″N 82°43′18″W

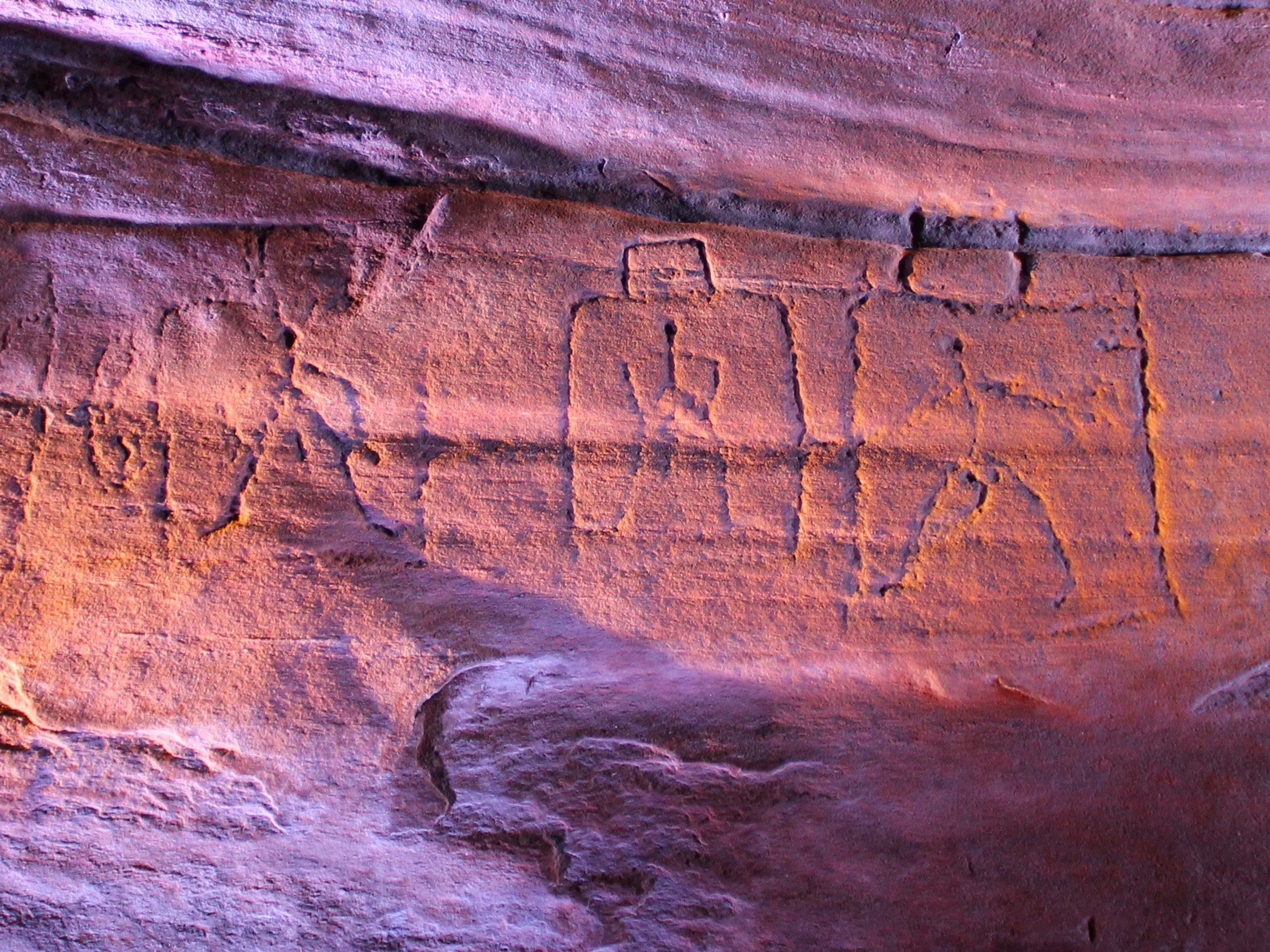
Petroglyphs at the South Carolina Petroglyph Site, displayed under colored lights for greater visibility.

The South Carolina Petroglyph Site is a county-owned museum at Hagood Mill Historic Site in Pickens County, South Carolina, managed by the non-profit Hagood Mill Foundation. The museum exhibits and protects in situ at least 32 rock art carvings (including 17 human figures), most believed to be prehistoric.

The Hagood petroglyphs were discovered on a rainy day in January 2003 by Michael Bramlett, a volunteer with the South Carolina Petroglyph Survey headed by University of South Carolina archaeologist Tommy Charles. Subsequently Charles and his team examined the large, low-lying boulder at night with side-scanning lights and found other glyphs invisible in daylight. Because a large portion of the boulder lay beneath a dirt road constructed in the 1820s, Charles received permission from Pickens County to excavate the covered portion of the rock. There he discovered additional human representations, all "sticklike figures" except for one with a head and legs but no arms and with a torso in the form of a rectangle, which the team dubbed "refrigerator man." Charles believed these carvings were prehistoric because they had been created by pecking (presumably with stone tools) rather than by scratching or incising with metal. Nevertheless, the age and purpose of the rock art (at least beyond motifs "universal to human experience, such as representations of animals or humans") remains undetermined.

Almost immediately plans were made to exhibit the rock art to encourage tourism; but the museum did not open until 2015 because of political infighting, construction errors, the firing of a county administrator, stalled fundraising during the Great Recession, and the sudden death of the Hagood Mill site manager.

The South Carolina Petroglyph Site is "a two-room, barn-like structure" built directly over the petroglyphs to facilitate display and ensure long-term protection of the artifacts. One room contains exhibits, including photographs and "portable" petroglyphs, and the other displays the rock from an accessible viewing platform where, presented under suitable lighting, visitors can hear a description of the petroglyphs recorded by Tommy Charles.
