= Hagood Mill =

- U.S. National Register of Historic Places
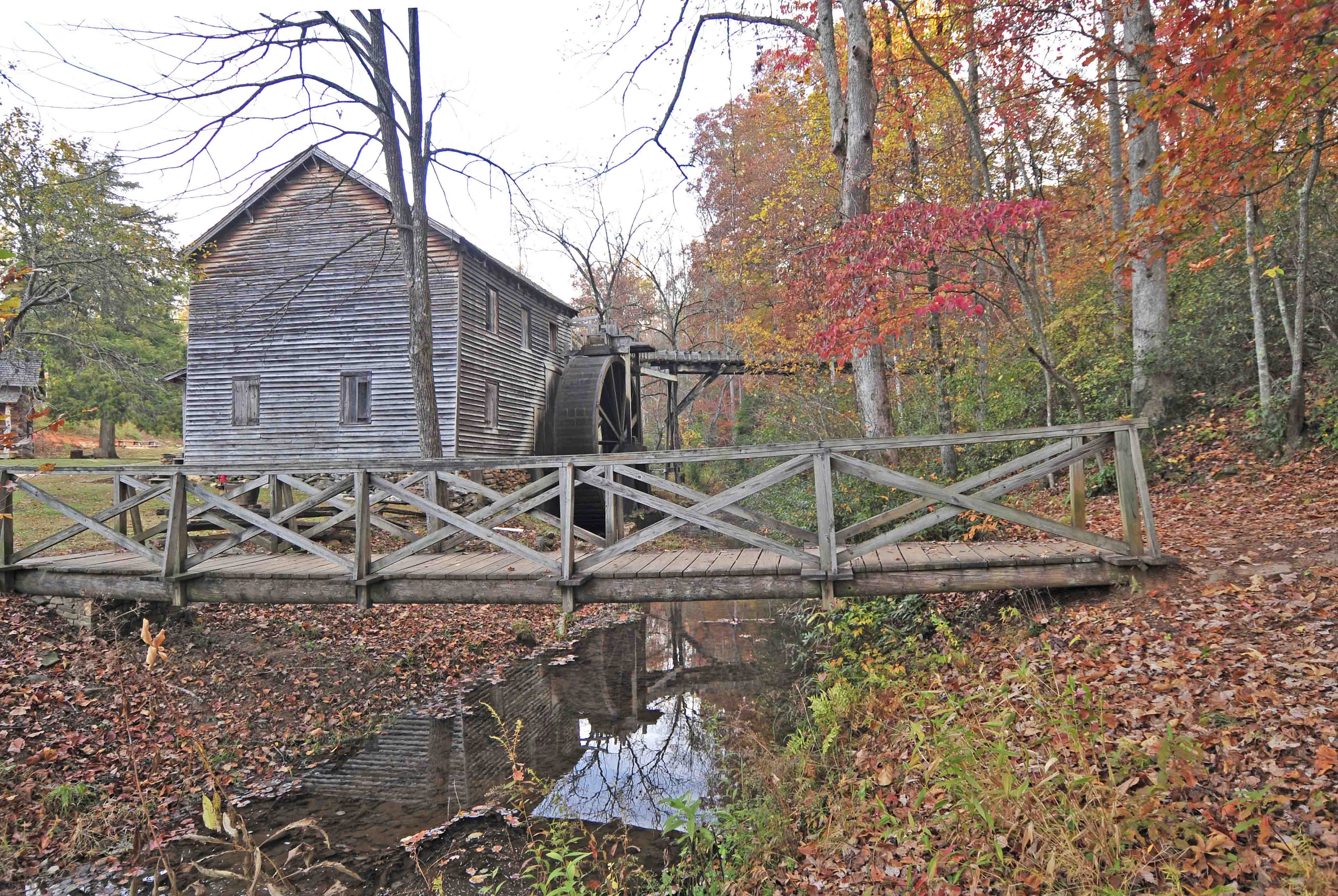

- Location within South Carolina Location within the United States
- Location: 138 Hagood Mill Road
- Nearest city: Pickens, South Carolina
- Coordinates: 34°55′37″N 82°43′20″W
- Area: 8 acres (3.2 ha)
- Built: 1826, 1845
- Built by: Hagood, Benjamin; Hagood, James E.
- NRHP reference No.: 72001217
- Added to NRHP: December 11, 1972

Hagood Mill is an operational water-powered gristmill built (or rebuilt) in 1845 by James Hagood near Pickens, South Carolina. It was listed in the National Register of Historic Places in 1972.

== History ==
Hagood Mill is located on Hagood Branch, earlier known as Jennings Creek, a tributary of the Twelve Mile River. Although mills had existed on the site as early as the 1790s, the current mill was built in 1845 by James Hagood; and it remained in the Hagood family and continued to operate until 1966 when federal regulations requiring the testing of corn before grinding effectively ended the operations of commercial grist mills in Pickens County. During the historic period the mill and the neighboring (non-extant) store were a gathering place for county residents.

The mill and surrounding property were donated to the Pickens Country Museum in 1973. The water wheel and mechanical components of the mill were rebuilt in the mid-1970s using much of the surviving fabric, and they were restored again by local historian and miller Alan Warner in the 1990s.

The 1845 mill is an unpainted, two-story building constructed of hand hewn logs and covered with clapboard siding. Its original dam site is 1,650 feet above it, where water from the creek was diverted to an earthen headrace (essentially a ditch). Today, water is pumped underground from the creek to the headrace, the last 80 feet of which is wooden. The overshot wooden water wheel, which produces 22 horsepower, is 20 ft (6.1 m) in diameter and 4 feet wide. The ring gear is 18 feet in diameter, and the two granite millstones weigh approximately 1,600 pounds each.

== Hagood Mill Historic Site & Folklife Center ==
The mill is the centerpiece of the Hagood Mill Historic Site & Folklife Center, which also includes two historic cabins, a blacksmith shop, a moonshine still, and a cotton gin. The site also includes the Hagood Creek Petroglyph Site, which preserves significant Native American rock carvings, and the 64-foot (20 m) steel Prater's Creek Bridge, built by the Greenville Steel and Foundry Company in 1930 and brought to the site in 2007.
