= Table Rock Civilian Conservation Corps Camp Site =

- U.S. National Register of Historic Places
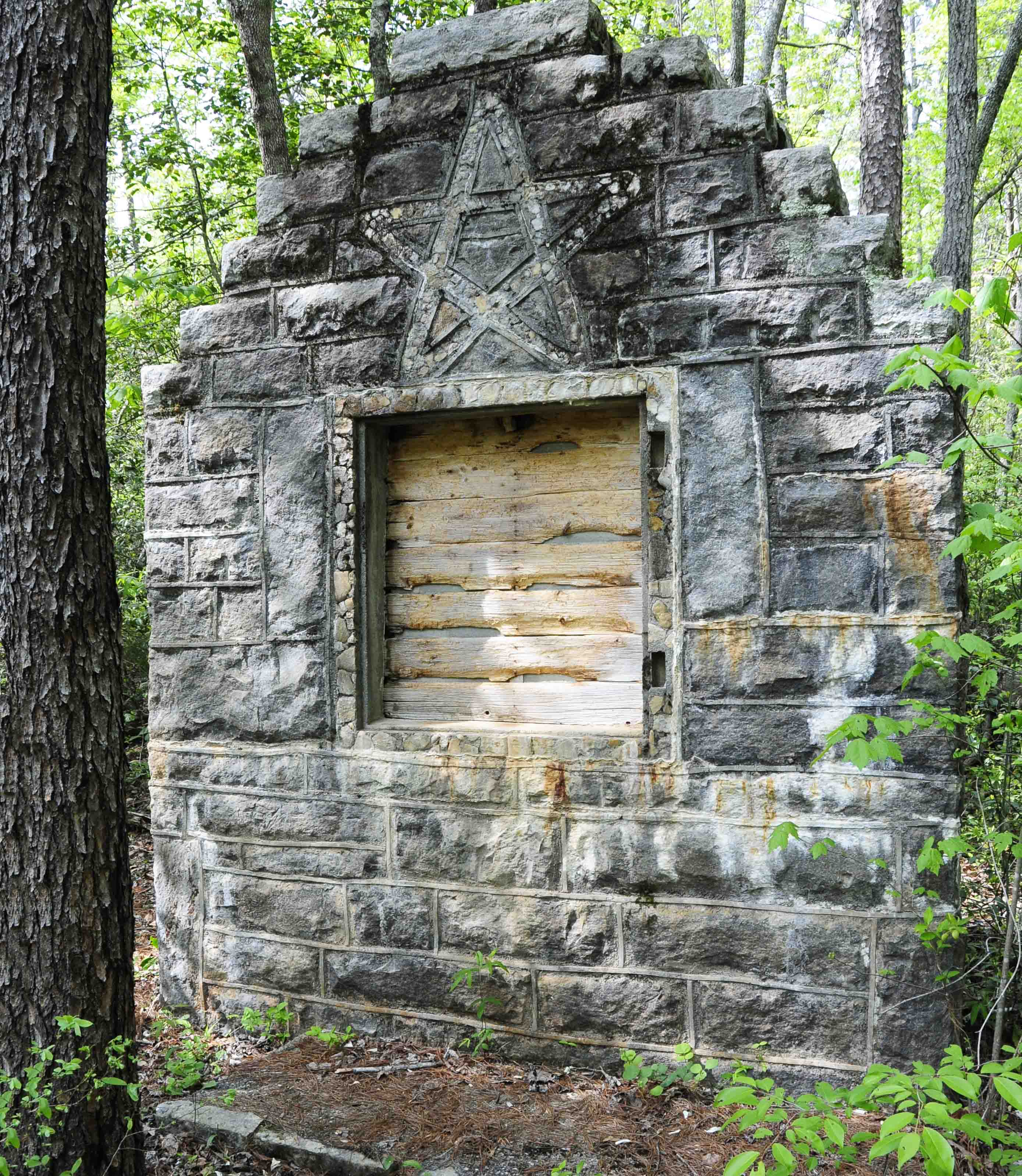
- Grotto Fountain and Basin, Table Rock CCC Camp Site, April 2012

- Location within South Carolina Location within the United States
- Location: Table Rock State Park Rd. Extension at South Carolina Highway 11, near Pickens, South Carolina
- Coordinates: 35°1′18″N 82°41′55″W
- Area: 3 acres (1.2 ha)
- Built by: Civilian Conservation Corps
- MPS: South Carolina State Parks MPS
- NRHP reference No.: 89000481
- Added to NRHP: June 16, 1989

Table Rock Civilian Conservation Corps Camp Site is a historic Civilian Conservation Corps (CCC) camp site located near Pickens, Pickens County, South Carolina. It contains remnants of the CCC construction of Table Rock State Park between 1935 and 1941, including the recreation hall chimney, bulletin board with adjacent benches, grotto fountain, and basin.

It was listed on the National Register of Historic Places in 1989.
