= Hagood-Mauldin House =

Historic house in South Carolina, United States

- U.S. National Register of Historic Places
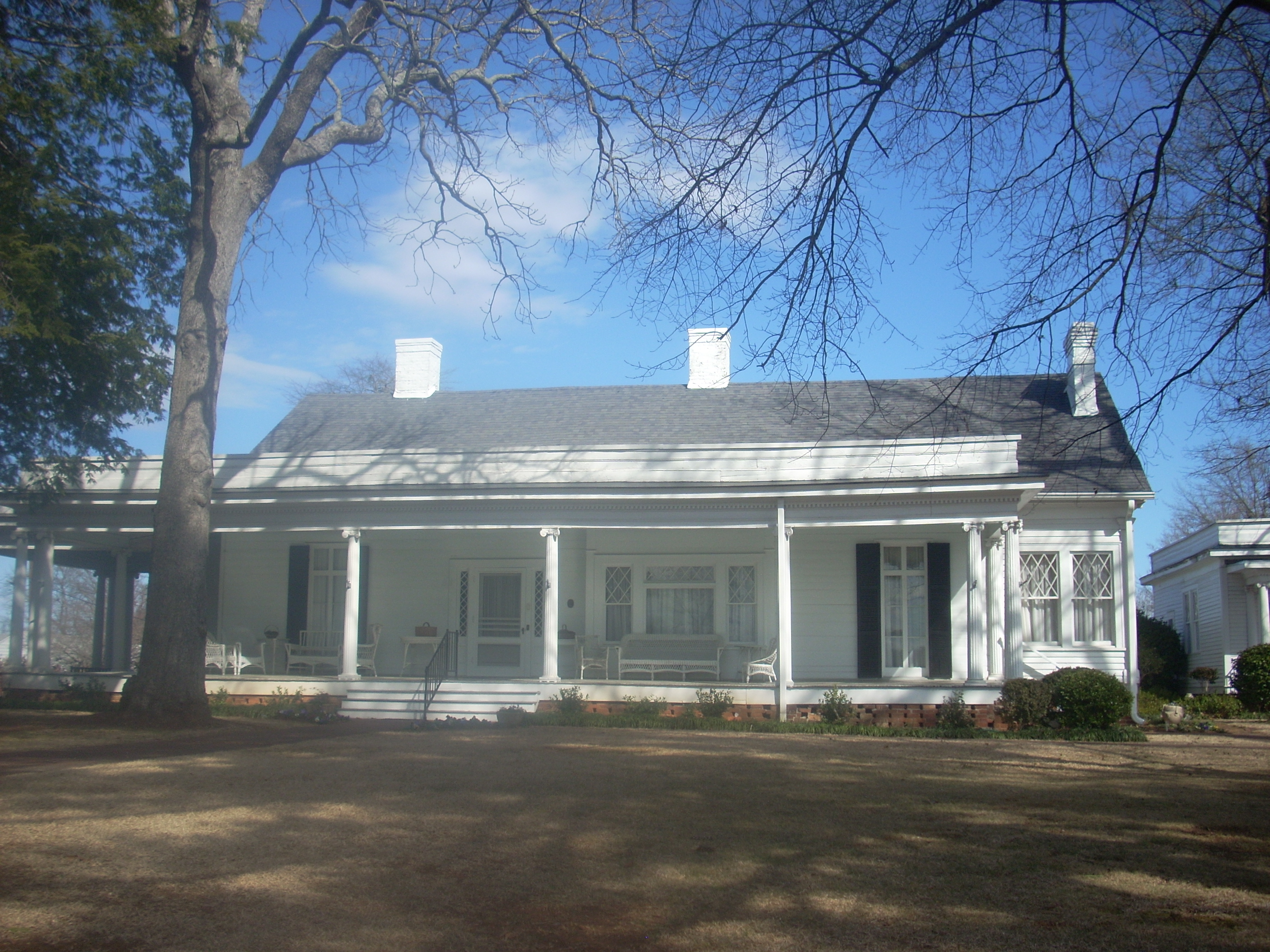
- Hagood-Mauldin House, 2011

- Location within South Carolina Location within the United States
- Location: 104 N. Lewis St., Pickens, South Carolina
- Coordinates: 34.885291°N 82.705355°W
- Area: less than one acre
- Built: 1868
- Architectural style: Classical Revival
- NRHP reference No.: 97001185
- Added to NRHP: October 9, 1997

The Hagood-Mauldin House is a property listed on the National Register of Historic Places located in Pickens, South Carolina. The house was originally constructed for James Earle Hagood ca.1856 in the town of Old Pickens but in 1868 when the Pickens District was divided into Oconee County and Pickens County, the house was disassembled, boards and beams numbered, and reassembled at its present location in the town of Pickens.

The original house was constructed with log beams and joists pegged together. The exterior was sided with slat boards and the roof was constructed with cedar wood shingles on open wood slats. The first addition to the house was made shortly after it was moved in 1868, when a dining room connected to the rear kitchen house, separated by a breezeway, was constructed. A second addition in 1886 expanded the front parlor and rear dining room and also created a covered side entry porch, a bathroom on the north side of the house and added new fireplaces serve the new rooms. A third addition was made in 1904 which expanded the front porch to include a covered driveway as well as enhancing the interior living spaces with Victorian trimwork and drywall. A wood parapet was added to the porch and the fluted Ionic columns were added, creating the Classical Revival style of the house that still remains.

The house was owned by James Earle Hagood, a clerk for the United States District Court for the District of South Carolina until his death in 1904. It was then owned by his daughter, Frances Hagood Mauldin and her husband, Judge Thomas Joab Mauldin who completed the 1904 addition and built a matching building on the property used as a law office.

The house is now home to the Irma Morris Museum of Fine Arts and is owned by the Pickens County Historical Society.
