= Pickens, South Carolina =

- City
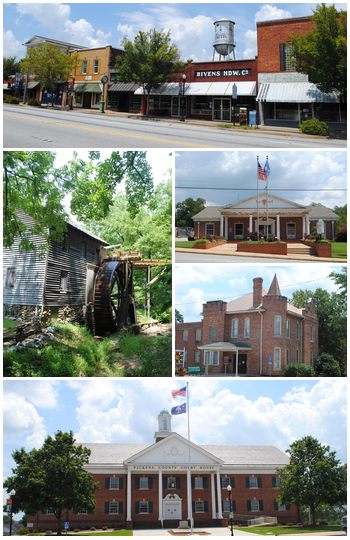
- Top, left to right: Downtown Pickens, Hagood Mill, Pickens City Hall, Old Pickens Jail, Pickens County Courthouse

- Seal
- Motto: "Where the Mountains Begin"
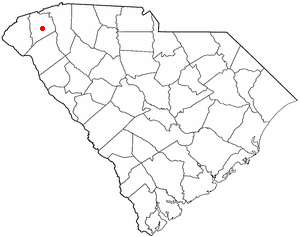
- Location of Pickens, South Carolina
- Coordinates: 34°52′48″N 82°42′22″W
- Country: United States
- State: South Carolina
- County: Pickens

Area
  - Total: 3.06 sq mi (7.93 km^{2})
  - Land: 3.04 sq mi (7.87 km^{2})
  - Water: 0.023 sq mi (0.06 km^{2})
- Elevation: 1,053 ft (321 m)

Population (2020)
  - Total: 3,388
  - Density: 1,114.8/sq mi (430.43/km^{2})
- Time zone: UTC−5 (Eastern (EST))
  - Summer (DST): UTC−4 (EDT)
- ZIP code: 29671
- Area codes: 864, 821
- FIPS code: 45-56140
- GNIS feature ID: 2404514
- Website: www.cityofpickens.com

Pickens, formerly called Pickens Courthouse, is a city in and the county seat of Pickens County, South Carolina, United States. As of the 2020 census, Pickens had a population of 3,388. Pickens changed its classification from a town to a city in 1998, but it was not reported to the Census Bureau until 2001. It was named after Andrew Pickens, an American revolutionary soldier and US Congressman for South Carolina.

Pickens is part of the Greenville-Mauldin-Easley metropolitan area.

== History ==
Present-day Pickens of Pickens County was previously Cherokee Territory. During the American Revolutionary War, the Cherokee sided with the Kingdom of Great Britain. When Great Britain was defeated in the war, the Cherokee were forced to surrender their land. In 1791, the state legislature established Washington District that comprises present-day Greenville, Anderson, Oconee, and Pickens Counties. In 1798 Washington District was divided into Greenville and Pendleton districts. The Pendleton district eventually became Anderson, Oconee, and Pickens County. Pendleton District was divided in 1828 into Anderson and Pickens. A courthouse was established on the banks of the Keowee River where the town of Pickens Court House was developed. The Hagood-Mauldin House was built circa 1856 and is one of the historic structures of Pickens County. In 1868, the Pickens District was divided for a final time, into Pickens and Oconee counties. Pickens Court House relocated to its present-day site and was renamed to Pickens.

The Pickens Railway was established in 1898 as a shortline railroad from Easley to Pickens. From 1955 until 1987, Sangamo-Weston Inc. operated a capacitor manufacturing facility just outside Pickens. Until they were banned in the US, Sangamo discharged a significant amount of polychlorinated biphenyls (PCBs) into a tributary of the Twelve Mile River which feeds into Lake Hartwell. Sangamo also dumped contaminated waste in six locations in the vicinity of Pickens. In two of these locations, the waste was burned, forming more dangerous dioxins. According to the Spartanburg Herald-Journal, contamination was discovered at the "Breazeale site", southwest of town. Schlumberger paid $11.8 million to federal and state agencies for injuries to natural resources caused by the contamination.

== Geography and climate ==
According to the United States Census Bureau, the town had a total area of 2.5 square miles (6.4 km^{2}), of which 2.5 square miles (6.3 km^{2}) is land and 0.04 square mile (0.1 km^{2}) (0.81%) is water.

Pickens also has several small mountains that surround the city. Glassy Mountain, located east of Pickens, is a small mountain that can be reached by several small private roads. Glassy Mountain is an excellent example of a piedmont monadnock, which are rare in South Carolina. Sixty-five acres of the mountain are part of the South Carolina Heritage Trust, and contain varied and rare plant species. Perhaps one of the most famous mountains in the area is Table Rock State Park, located just to the north of Pickens, but still in the Pickens area, which has been a symbol for Pickens and can be seen throughout Pickens and nearby cities such as Easley and Greenville. In addition to Table Rock Mountain, the park contains Pinnacle Mountain, the highest mountain contained entirely within the state of South Carolina.

Climate data for Pickens, South Carolina (1991–2020 normals, extremes 1941–present)
Month	Jan	Feb	Mar	Apr	May	Jun	Jul	Aug	Sep	Oct	Nov	Dec	Year
Record high °F (°C)	80 (27)	81 (27)	89 (32)	93 (34)	98 (37)	102 (39)	106 (41)	105 (41)	101 (38)	97 (36)	85 (29)	78 (26)	106 (41)
Mean daily maximum °F (°C)	52.5 (11.4)	56.1 (13.4)	63.7 (17.6)	72.9 (22.7)	79.8 (26.6)	86.4 (30.2)	89.8 (32.1)	88.2 (31.2)	82.9 (28.3)	73.4 (23.0)	63.1 (17.3)	54.9 (12.7)	72.0 (22.2)
Daily mean °F (°C)	41.4 (5.2)	44.4 (6.9)	51.3 (10.7)	59.8 (15.4)	68.2 (20.1)	75.8 (24.3)	79.3 (26.3)	78.2 (25.7)	72.3 (22.4)	61.3 (16.3)	50.7 (10.4)	44.0 (6.7)	60.6 (15.9)
Mean daily minimum °F (°C)	30.4 (−0.9)	32.4 (0.2)	39.0 (3.9)	46.8 (8.2)	56.6 (13.7)	65.1 (18.4)	68.9 (20.5)	68.1 (20.1)	61.8 (16.6)	49.2 (9.6)	38.2 (3.4)	33.1 (0.6)	49.2 (9.6)
Record low °F (°C)	−6 (−21)	0 (−18)	7 (−14)	24 (−4)	34 (1)	43 (6)	51 (11)	52 (11)	35 (2)	26 (−3)	9 (−13)	0 (−18)	−6 (−21)
Average precipitation inches (mm)	5.24 (133)	4.54 (115)	4.92 (125)	4.68 (119)	3.98 (101)	5.02 (128)	4.75 (121)	5.07 (129)	4.54 (115)	4.06 (103)	4.20 (107)	5.67 (144)	56.67 (1,439)
Average snowfall inches (cm)	0.4 (1.0)	0.2 (0.51)	0.0 (0.0)	0.0 (0.0)	0.0 (0.0)	0.0 (0.0)	0.0 (0.0)	0.0 (0.0)	0.0 (0.0)	0.0 (0.0)	0.0 (0.0)	0.4 (1.0)	1.0 (2.5)
Average precipitation days (≥ 0.01 in)	9.8	9.5	10.3	9.4	9.1	11.1	11.3	11.3	8.2	7.4	8.1	10.1	115.6
Average snowy days (≥ 0.1 in)	0.2	0.0	0.0	0.0	0.0	0.0	0.0	0.0	0.0	0.0	0.0	0.2	0.4
Source: NOAA

== Demographics ==
Historical population
Census	Pop.	Note	%±
1880	212		—
1890	283		33.5%
1900	449		58.7%
1910	897		99.8%
1920	895		−0.2%
1930	1,130		26.3%
1940	1,637		44.9%
1950	1,961		19.8%
1960	2,198		12.1%
1970	2,954		34.4%
1980	3,199		8.3%
1990	3,042		−4.9%
2000	3,012		−1.0%
2010	3,126		3.8%
2020	3,388		8.4%
U.S. Decennial Census

=== 2020 census ===
As of the 2020 census, Pickens had a population of 3,388. The median age was 41.2 years. 20.0% of residents were under the age of 18 and 19.3% of residents were 65 years of age or older. For every 100 females there were 96.5 males, and for every 100 females age 18 and over there were 94.6 males age 18 and over.

98.2% of residents lived in urban areas, while 1.8% lived in rural areas.

There were 1,307 households in Pickens, of which 28.5% had children under the age of 18 living in them. Of all households, 37.5% were married-couple households, 20.2% were households with a male householder and no spouse or partner present, and 36.1% were households with a female householder and no spouse or partner present. About 32.0% of all households were made up of individuals and 12.9% had someone living alone who was 65 years of age or older.

There were 1,474 housing units, of which 11.3% were vacant. The homeowner vacancy rate was 3.2% and the rental vacancy rate was 7.3%.

Racial composition as of the 2020 census
Race	Number	Percent
White	2,615	77.2%
Black or African American	452	13.3%
American Indian and Alaska Native	15	0.4%
Asian	10	0.3%
Native Hawaiian and Other Pacific Islander	0	0.0%
Some other race	47	1.4%
Two or more races	249	7.3%
Hispanic or Latino (of any race)	138	4.1%

=== 2000 census ===
As of the census of 2000, there were 3,012 people, 1,281 households, and 794 families residing in the town. The population density was 1,227.1 inhabitants per square mile (473.8/km^{2}). There were 1,438 housing units at an average density of 585.8 per square mile (226.2/km^{2}). The racial makeup of the town was 80.54% White, 16.80% African American, 0.07% Native American, 0.37% Asian, 1.06% from other races, and 1.16% from two or more races. Hispanic or Latino of any race were 2.49% of the population.

There were 1,281 households, out of which 27.9% had children under the age of 18 living with them, 40.8% were married couples living together, 17.7% had a female householder with no husband present, and 38.0% were non-families. 34.4% of all households were made up of individuals, and 15.6% had someone living alone who was 65 years of age or older. The average household size was 2.26 and the average family size was 2.88.

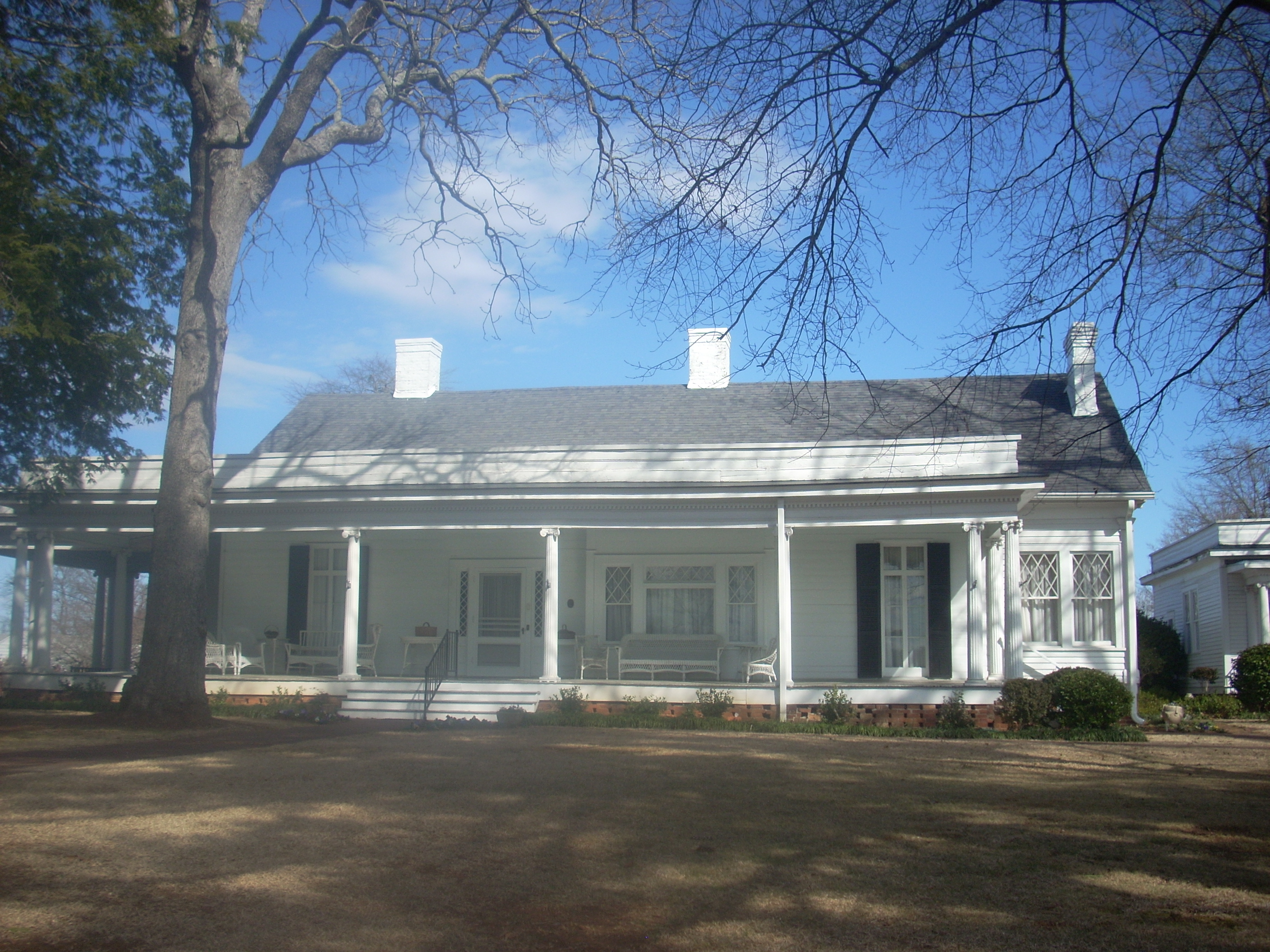
Hagood-Mauldin House

In the town the population was spread out, with 22.5% under the age of 18, 9.1% from 18 to 24, 26.6% from 25 to 44, 20.8% from 45 to 64, and 21.0% who were 65 years of age or older. The median age was 38 years. For every 100 females, there were 82.8 males. For every 100 females age 18 and over, there were 78.0 males.

The median income for a household in the town was $26,364, and the median income for a family was $36,316. Males had a median income of $27,316 versus $19,706 for females. The per capita income for the town was $16,436. About 12.7% of families and 20.0% of the population were below the poverty line, including 26.5% of those under age 18 and 22.5% of those age 65 or over.

== Historical attractions ==
Located three miles north of downtown on US 178 is Hagood Mill, listed on the National Register of Historic Places since 1972. Constructed in 1845 the grist mill was operational until the 1960s. There are monthly southern heritage festivals at the site, and stone ground corn meal and grits may be purchased. Of particular interest are petroglyphs discovered in 2003, estimated to be 1,500 to 2,000 years old and possibly from the Hopewell culture. A museum is planned for the historically significant site.

The Old Pickens Jail is one of the few remaining early jails in Piedmont, South Carolina. It was constructed in 1903 and served as a detention facility and offices and living quarters for the county sheriff. The building is on the National Register of Historic Places and now serves the community as a museum.

== Education ==
The School District of Pickens County is headquartered in Easley, a neighboring city. The city itself contains three elementary schools, a middle school and a high school.

- Pickens Elementary
- Hagood Elementary
- Pickens Middle
- Pickens High School

Pickens has a public library, a branch of the Pickens County Library System.

== Notable people ==
- Bobby Baker (1928 - 2017) political adviser to Lyndon B. Johnson
- Browning Bryant (1957-2019) singer-songwriter
- Sam Wyche (1945-2020) football quarterback and coach
