= South Carolina Heritage Corridor: Discovery Route =

Highway in South Carolina, US

South Carolina Heritage Corridor: Discovery Route
- SC Discovery Route
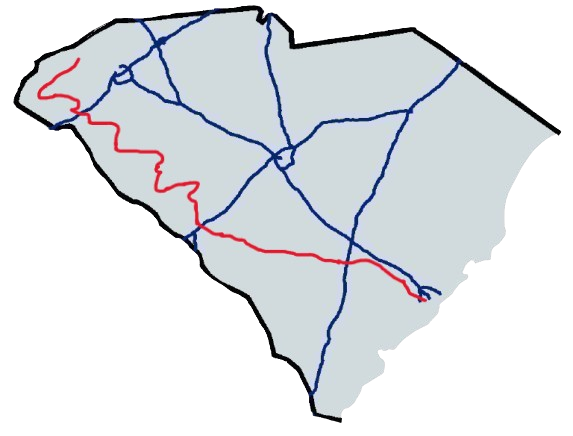
- SC Discovery Route highlighted in red

Route information
- Maintained by SCDOT
- Length: 323.3 mi (520.3 km)

Major junctions
- South end: US 17 in Charleston
- I-526 / SC 61 / SC 171 in Charleston; US 78 / US 17 Alt. / US 17 Alt. Truck / SC 91 / SC 165 in Summerville; I-95 / US 15 / US 78 in St. George; US 78 / US 301 / US 601 in Bamberg; I-20 / US 1 / US 78 / SC 19 in Aiken; US 25 / SC 19 / SC 121 in Trenton; US 25 / US 378 in Pleasant Lane; US 25 / US 178 / US 221 / SC 72 / SC 72 Bus. in Greenwood; I-85 / US 29 / US 76 / US 178 / SC 28 / SC 81 in Anderson; US 76 / US 123 / SC 28 in Clemson
- North end: SC 8 / SC 11 near Pumpkintown

Location
- Country: United States
- State: South Carolina
- Counties: Pickens, Oconee, Anderson, Abbeville, Greenwood, Edgefield, Aiken, Barnwell, Bamberg, Orangeburg, Dorchester, Charleston

Highway system
- South Carolina State Highway System; Interstate; US; State; Scenic
← SC 917	→ US 1

The South Carolina Heritage Corridor: Discovery Route (SC Discovery Route) is a highway that is a part of the South Carolina National Heritage Corridor, which contains one other highway known as the South Carolina Heritage Corridor: Nature Route or the Savannah River Scenic Byway. The Discovery Route runs for 338.7 miles (545.1 km), serving historical sites in cities such as Greenwood, Ninety Six, Anderson, Charleston, Walhalla, Abbeville, Due West, etc. Some sites it also passes by are the Ninety Six National Historic Site, the Edgefield Courthouse, Erskine College, etc.

== Route description ==
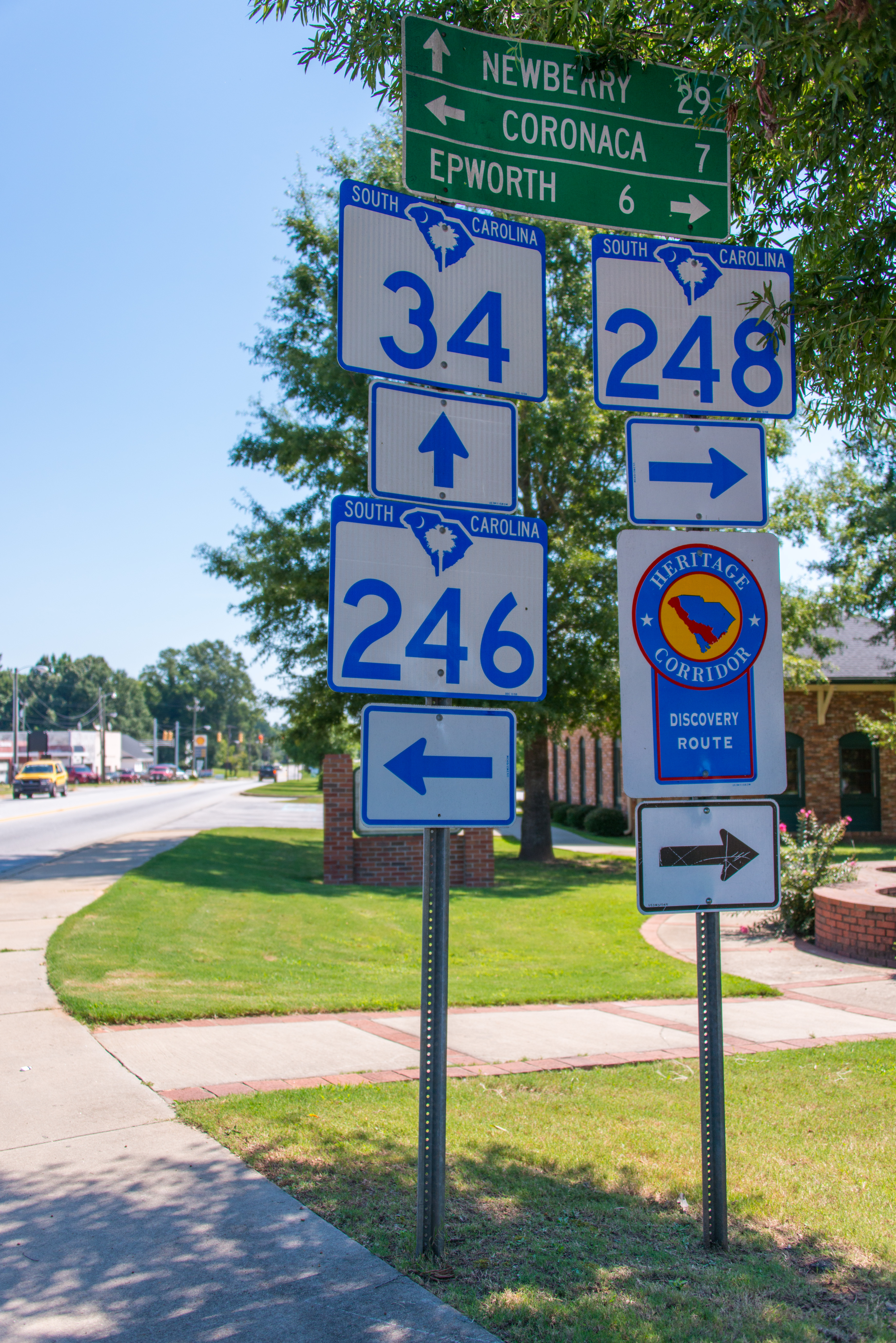
The Discovery Route leaving SC 34 and joining SC 248 in Ninety Six

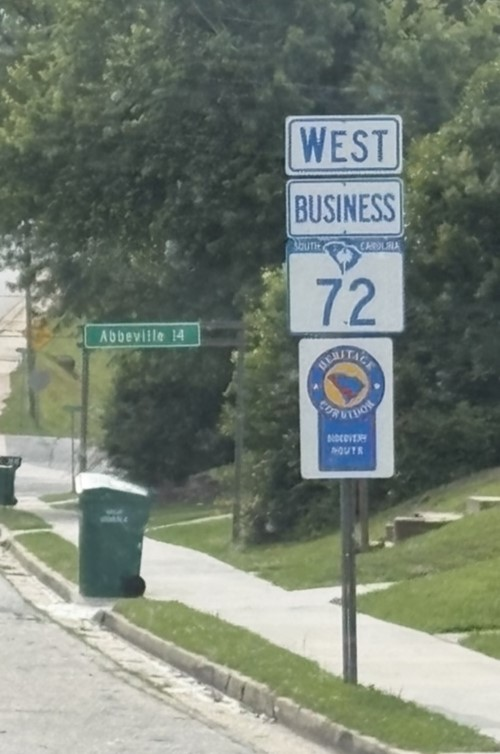
SC 72 Business and the SC Discovery Route in Greenwood

=== Upstate ===
The Discovery Route travels throughout the state generally in a northwest–southeast direction (no signage indicating direction within this route). In the Upstate, it is mostly concurrent with US 76 in Westminster to Honea Path, US 178 from Main Street in Anderson to SC 184 in Donalds, SC 72 from Main Street in Abbeville to SC 72 Business in Greenwood, and from SC 248 in Ninety Six from SC 34 to US 178 near Epworth.

=== Midlands ===
In the Midlands, it follows US 25 and US 25 Business into Edgefield. It then enters Aiken via SC 19. After splitting from SC 19 in downtown, it joins US 78 (Charleston Highway) for quite a while on the way out of Aiken.

=== Lowcountry ===
Entering the Lowcountry, it and US 78 meet US 321, US 301, US 601, US 21, I-95, US 15, US 178 (once again), SC 27, and US 17 Alt. before finally splitting in Summerville. The Discovery Route follows the routing of SC 165 and SC 61, meeting I-526 before ending in Charleston at US 17.

== Major intersections ==
County	Location	mi	km	Destinations	Notes
Pickens	Pumpkintown	0.0	0.0	SC 8 / SC 11 – Pickens, Greenville, Table Rock	Northern terminus; northern end of SC 8 concurrency
Pickens	Pumpkintown	3.7	6.0	SC 288 – Marietta	
Pickens	Pumpkintown	4.3	6.9	SC 135 – Easley	
Pickens	Pickens	9.9	15.9	SC 186 east – Dacusville	
Pickens	Pickens	12.8	20.6	SC 183 – Greenville	Northern end of SC 183 concurrency
Pickens	Pickens	13.5	21.7	SC 8 – Easley	Southern end of SC 8 concurrency
Pickens	Pickens	13.6	21.9	US 178 – Rosman, Liberty	
Pickens	Pickens	19.2	30.9	SC 137 – Clemson, Six Mile	
Pickens	Pickens	21.2	34.1	SC 133 – Clemson, Six Mile	
Oconee	Lake Keowee	27.6	44.4	SC 130 – Seneca	Southern end of SC 130 concurrency
Oconee	Lake Keowee	29.3	47.2	SC 130 – Salem	Northern end of SC 130 concurrency
Oconee	West Union	32.9	52.9	SC 188 – Seneca	
Oconee	Walhalla	36.3	58.4	SC 11 – West Union, Salem	
Oconee	Walhalla	40.1	64.5	SC 28 – West Union	Northern end of SC 28 concurrency
Oconee	Walhalla	40.2	64.7	SC 28 – Mountain Rest	Southern end of SC 28 concurrency
Oconee	Westminster	47.7	76.8	SC 183 ends / US 76 / US 123 – Westminster	Southern end of SC 183 concurrency; northern end of US 76/US 123 concurrency
Oconee	Westminster	47.9	77.1	SC 24 – Oakway, Townville	
Oconee	Westminster	43.8	70.5	SC 11 to I-85 – Walhalla, South Union, Fair Play	
Oconee	Seneca	48.4	77.9	SC 28 / SC 59 south – Walhalla, West Union, Seneca	Northern end of SC 28 concurrency; northern terminus of SC 59
Oconee	Seneca	50.9	81.9	SC 130 – Seneca, Keowee Key	
Pickens	Clemson	55.4	89.2	SC 93 – Clemson	
Pickens	Clemson	57.2	92.1	SC 133 – Clemson, Six Mile	
Pickens	Clemson	57.5	92.5	US 123 – Easley, Greenville	Southern end of US 123 concurrency
Pickens	Clemson	57.6	92.7	SC 93 – Central, Norris, Liberty	
Pickens	Pendleton	58.1	93.5	US 76 / SC 28 / SC 28 Bus. – Pendleton	Northern end of SC 28 Bus. concurrency; southern end of US 76/SC 28 concurrency
Anderson	Pendleton	61.4	98.8	SC 88 east – Greenville	Western terminus of SC 88
Anderson	Pendleton	63.1	101.5	US 76 / SC 28 / SC 28 Bus. ends – Anderson	Northern end of US 76/SC 28 concurrency; southern end of SC 28 Bus. concurrency
Anderson	Pendleton	64.0	103.0	US 76 / SC 28 / SC 187 – Northlake, Anderson	Northern end of SC 187 concurrency; southern end of US 76/SC 28 concurrency
Anderson		69.9	112.5	I-85 – Greenville	Diamond interchange
Anderson		71.1	114.4	SC 24 / SC Nature Route / Savannah River Scenic Byway – Townville	Northern end of SC 24/SC Nature Route/Savannah River Scenic Byway concurrency
Anderson		73.8	118.8	SC 187 / SC Nature Route / Savannah River Scenic Byway	Southern end of SC 187/SC Nature Route/Savannah River Scenic Byway concurrency
Anderson	Anderson	77.7	125.0	SC 28 – Antreville, Abbeville	
Anderson	Anderson	79.5	127.9	US 76 / US 178 / US 29 Bus. / SC 24 / SC 81 / SC 28 Bus. (Murray Avenue) – Belton, Liberty, Clemson, Greenville	Southern end of SC 24 concurrency
Anderson	Anderson	80.1	128.9	US 76 / US 178 (River Street) – Belton	Northern end of US 76/US 178 concurrency
Anderson	Anderson	81.3	130.8	US 29 – Anderson	Northern end of US 29 concurrency
Anderson	Anderson	81.8	131.6	US 29 – Williamston	Southern end of US 29 concurrency
Anderson		85.2	137.1	SC 252 east – Honea Path	Eastbound access only; western terminus of SC 252
Anderson		85.5	137.6	Amity Road to SC 252	Provides access to both directions of SC 252
Anderson	Belton	89.9	144.7	SC 413 – Iva	
Anderson	Belton	92.3	148.5	SC 20 west – Due West, Abbeville	Western end of SC 20 concurrency
Anderson	Belton	92.3	148.5	SC 20 east to SC 247 north – Williamston, Greenville, Ware Place	Eastern end of SC 20 concurrency
Anderson	Honea Path	100.4	161.6	SC 252 – Anderson	Western end of SC 252 concurrency
Anderson	Honea Path	100.5	161.7	US 76 east / SC 252 – Laurens, Greenville, Ware Shoals	Eastern end of SC 252 concurrency; southern end of US 76 concurrency
Abbeville	Donalds	106.0	170.6	SC 184 east – Ware Shoals	Northern end of SC 184 concurrency
Abbeville	Donalds	106.1	170.8	US 178 east – Greenwood	Southern end of US 178 concurrency
Abbeville	Due West			SC 20 east / SC 184 west / SC 185 north – Belton, Anderson, Iva	Southern end of SC 184 concurrency; northern end of SC 20/SC 185 concurrency
Abbeville		112.5	181.1	SC 185 south – Hodges	Southern end of SC 185 concurrency
Abbeville		118.5	190.7	SC 201 north – Level Land	Southern terminus of SC 201
Abbeville		120.2	193.4	SC 20 Truck to SC 28 Conn. / SC 28	Eastern terminus of SC 28 Conn./SC 20 Truck
Abbeville	Abbeville	121.8	196.0	SC 71 north – Lowndesville	
Abbeville	Abbeville	122.1	196.5	SC 20 ends / SC 203 north – Hodges	Western terminus of SC 20; southern terminus of SC 203
Abbeville	Abbeville	122.5	197.1	SC 72 / SC 20 Truck / SC 71 Truck – Greenwood	Western end of SC 72 concurrency; SC 20/SC 71 Truck southern terminus
Greenwood		132.6	213.4	Woodlawn Road (S-24-495)	
Greenwood		133.1	214.2	SC 72 / SC 72 Bus. east – Greenwood, Clinton	Eastern end of SC 72 concurrency; western end of SC 72 Bus. concurrency
Greenwood	Greenwood	134.4	216.3	SC 225 south to US 25 south / US 178 east / US 221 south – Edgefield, Saluda, McCormick	Northern terminus of SC 225
Greenwood	Greenwood	135.8	218.5	US 25 Bus. / US 178 Bus. / SC 72 Bus. – Anderson, Greenville, Clinton	Eastern end of SC 72 Bus. concurrency; northern end of US 25/US 178 concurrency
Greenwood	Greenwood	136.1	219.0	US 25 Bus. / US 178 Bus. to SC 10 west – Edgefield, Saluda	Southern end of US 25 Bus./US 178 Bus. concurrency; Discovery Route turns onto Seaboard Avenue
Greenwood	Greenwood	137.7	221.6	US 25 / US 178 / US 221 – Edgefield, Greenville	
Greenwood		141.4	227.6	SC 34 (Ninety Six Highway) – Greenwood	Western end of SC 34 concurrency
Greenwood	Ninety Six	144.9	233.2	SC 34 / SC 246 / SC 248 begin – Coronaca, Newberry, Epworth	Eastern end of SC 34 concurrency; northern end of SC 248 concurrency
Greenwood	Epworth	151.0	243.0	US 178 / SC 248 ends – Greenwood	Southern end of SC 248 concurrency; northern end of US 178 concurrency
Greenwood		151.1	243.2	US 178 – Saluda	Southern end of US 178 concurrency; Discovery Route turns onto Camp Epworth Road (S-24-44)
Greenwood		153.6	247.2	US 25 – Greenwood	Northern end of US 25 concurrency
Edgefield		164.6	264.9	US 378 – McCormick, Saluda	
Edgefield		172.5	277.6	SC 283 – Plum Branch	
Edgefield	Edgefield	174.9	281.5	US 25 / US 25 Bus. begins / SC 23 Truck – Edgefield, Aiken	Southern end of US 25 concurrency; northern end of US 25 Bus./SC 23 Truck concurrency
Edgefield	Edgefield	175.3	282.1	SC 23 Truck / SC 430 – Johnston, Saluda	Southern end of SC 23 Truck concurrency
Edgefield	Edgefield	175.9	283.1	SC 23 – Modoc	Northern end of SC 23 concurrency
Edgefield	Edgefield	176.3	283.7	SC 23 – Johnston, Batesburg-Leesville	Southern end of SC 23 concurrency
Edgefield	Edgefield	177.7	286.0	US 25 – North Augusta	Southern end of US 25 Bus. concurrency; northern end of US 25 concurrency
Edgefield		182.0	292.9	US 25 / SC 19 / SC 121 – North Augusta, Johnston, Aiken	Southern end of US 25 concurrency; northern end of SC 19 concurrency
Aiken		188.2	302.9	SC 191 – Johnston	Northern end of SC 191 concurrency
Aiken		191.3	307.9	SC 191	Southern end of SC 191 concurrency
Aiken		191.8	308.7	I-20 – Columbia, Augusta	Diamond interchange
Aiken	Aiken	196.1	315.6	US 1 Truck / US 78 Truck / SC 118 / SC 19 Truck – North Augusta	
Aiken	Aiken	197.5	317.8	US 1 / US 78 – Charleston, Columbia	Western end of US 1/US 78 concurrency
Aiken	Aiken	197.7	318.2	US 1 / SC 19	Southern end of SC 19 concurrency; eastern end of US 1 concurrency
Aiken	Aiken	201.5	324.3	SC 4 – Springfield	Western end of SC 4 concurrency
Aiken	Aiken			US 78 Truck / SC 118 / SC 302 / SC 4 Truck / SC 19 Truck – North Augusta, Wagener	
Aiken		217.9	350.7	SC 781 to US 278	
Barnwell	Williston	219.5	353.3	SC 39 to US 278	Western end of SC 39 concurrency
Barnwell	Williston	219.6	353.4	SC 39 – Springfield	Eastern end of SC 39 concurrency
Barnwell	Elko	220.2	354.4	SC 37 – Barnwell, Springfield	
Barnwell	Blackville	226.7	364.8	US 78 / US 78 Bus. begins – Blackville	Eastern end of US 78 concurrency; western end of US 78 Bus. concurrency
Barnwell	Blackville	227.0	365.3	SC 3 (Soloman Blatt Avenue) – Springfield, Barnwell	
Barnwell	Blackville	227.0	365.3	SC 304 south – Hilda	
Barnwell	Blackville	227.4	366.0	US 78 Bus. ends / US 78	Eastern end of US 78 Bus. concurrency; western end of US 78 concurrency
Bamberg	Denmark	234.7	377.7	US 321 / SC 70 – Orangeburg, Norway, Barnwell, Olar	
Bamberg	Bamberg	241.3	388.3	US 301 / US 601 – Allendale, Orangeburg	
Bamberg	Bamberg	241.7	389.0	SC 362 – Williams, Smoaks	Western terminus of SC 362
Bamberg		251.0	403.9	SC 61 – Canadys	Northern terminus of SC 61
Orangeburg	Branchville	255.5	411.2	US 21 – Smoaks	Southern end of US 21 concurrency
Orangeburg	Branchville	255.6	411.3	US 21 to SC 210 – Orangeburg, Bowman	Northern end of US 21 concurrency
Dorchester	St. George	268.5	432.1	I-95 – Florence	Patrial cloverleaf (Parclo) interchange
Dorchester	St. George	269.6	433.9	US 15 – Canadys, Walterboro, Santee	
Dorchester		282.9	455.3	US 178 – Bowman, Harleyville	Eastern terminus of US 178; 5th meetup with this highway
Dorchester		285.9	460.1	SC 27 north to I-26 / US 176 – Holly Hill, Columbia	Western end of SC 27 concurrency
Dorchester		286.2	460.6	SC 27 south to SC 61 – Ridgeville	Eastern end of SC 27 concurrency
Dorchester	Ridgeville	287.5	462.7	SC 173 south to SC 27 south – Ridgeville	Northern terminus of SC 173
Dorchester	Summerville	296.1	476.5	US 17 Alt. north / US 78 east to US 17 Alt. Truck / SC 91 – Moncks Corner, Charleston, Goose Creek	Northern end of US 17 Alt concurrency; eastern end of US 78 concurrency
Dorchester	Summerville	297.8	479.3	US 17 Alt. (East Carolina Ave) – Walterboro	Southern end of US 17 Alt. concurrency; intersection known as The Five Points of Summerville; SC Discovery Route turns left onto E Carolina Ave.
Dorchester	Summerville	298.2	479.9	SC 165 begins / US 17 Alt. Truck / SC 91 – Summerville, Moncks Corner, Walterboro	Northern end of SC 165 concurrency; northern terminus of SC 165
Dorchester	Summerville	300.9	484.3	SC 642 to US 17 Alt. south – Charleston, Walterboro	
Dorchester	Summerville	302.7	487.1	SC 165 south / SC 61 south (Ashley River Road) – Ravenel, Charleston	Southern end of SC 165 concurrency; northern end of SC 61 concurrency
Charleston	Charleston	316.4	509.2	I-526 – North Charleston	No access to I-526
Charleston	Charleston	319.4	514.0	Paul Cantrell Boulevard to I-526	
Charleston	Charleston	320.0	515.0	SC 7 (Sam Rittenberg Boulevard) – North Charleston	
Charleston	Charleston	321.4	517.2	SC 171 north (Old Towne Road) to SC 7 north – North Charleston	Western end of SC 171 concurrency; Ashley River Road ends
Charleston	Charleston	323.0	519.8	To SC 171 south / US 17 south – James Island	Eastern end of SC 171 concurrency
Charleston	Charleston	323.1	520.0	SC 61 south to SC 30	SC Discovery Route turns left; southern end of SC 61 concurrency
Charleston	Charleston	323.3	520.3	US 17 north to I-26 east – Charleston	Southern terminus; Discovery Route merges into US 17, SC Nature Route, and Cultural Heritage Corridor Route
1.000 mi = 1.609 km; 1.000 km = 0.621 mi: Concurrency terminus
