= U.S. Route 123 =

Highway in the United States

U.S. Route 123
- US 123 highlighted in red

Route information
- Auxiliary route of US 23
- Length: 75.12 mi (120.89 km)
- Tourist routes: SC Heritage Corridor: Discovery Route

Major junctions
- South end: US 23 / US 441 / SR 15 / SR 365 near Clarkesville, GA
- SR 17 / SR 63 / SR 106 / SR 184 near Toccoa, GA; US 76 in Westminster, SC; SC 183 in Westminster, SC; SC 11 near Westminster, SC; SC 28 / SC 59 in Seneca, SC; US 76 / SC 28 in Clemson, SC; US 178 near Liberty, SC; SC 93 in Easley, SC; US 25 near Greenville, SC; US 29 in Greenville, SC
- North end: I-385 BS in Greenville, SC

Location
- Country: United States
- States: Georgia, South Carolina
- Counties: GA: Habersham, Stephens; SC: Oconee, Pickens, Greenville

Highway system
- United States Numbered Highway System; List; Special; Divided
- Georgia State Highway System; Interstate; US; State; Special
- South Carolina State Highway System; Interstate; US; State; Scenic
← SR 122	GA	→ SR 123
← SC 122	SC	→ SC 124

U.S. Route 123 (US 123) is a spur of US 23 in the U.S. states of Georgia and South Carolina. The U.S. Highway runs 75.12 miles (120.89 km) from its western terminus (signed as south) at US 23, US 441, SR 15 and SR 365 near Clarkesville, Georgia, east (though signed as north) to Interstate 385 Business (I-385 Business) in Greenville, South Carolina. US 123 parallels I-85 to the north as it connects the Northeast Georgia cities of Clarkesville and Toccoa with the western Upstate South Carolina communities of Westminster, Seneca, Clemson, Easley, and Greenville.

== Route description ==
Lengths
	mi	km
GA	17.70	28.49
SC	57.42	92.41
Total	75.12	120.89

US 123 has a length of 17.70 miles (28.49 km) in Georgia and 57.42 miles (92.41 km) in South Carolina. The U.S. Highway runs concurrently with SR 365 for its entire length in Georgia. US 123 is part of the National Highway System from its southern terminus to SR 17 and SR 184 near Toccoa and from US 76 and SC 28 in Clemson to SC 183 in Greenville.

=== Georgia ===
US 123 begins at a partial interchange with US 23, US 441, SR 15 and SR 365 east of Clarkesville. The interchange provides access between US 123 and those highways in the direction of Cornelia, Gainesville, and Atlanta. Access to northbound US 23, US 441, and SR 15 is provided via SR 17 (Toccoa Highway), which US 123 meets at its next intersection and with which the highway begins to run concurrently. US 123 and SR 17 head east along a four-lane divided highway through Chattahoochee National Forest. The highways cross the Habersham–Stephens county line and pass over Norfolk Southern Railway's Greenville District while passing along the north side of Currahee Mountain. At their intersection with SR 184 (Dicks Hill Parkway), SR 17 continues southeast along the divided highway toward Lavonia while US 123 turns north and joins SR 184 on Curahee Street, which forms the border of the national forest until the highways reach the city limits of Toccoa.

US 123 and SR 184 gain a center turn lane and cross a Norfolk Southern rail line as they approach the downtown area. In the center of town, the highway begins to parallel the Greenville District rail line and intersects Broad Street, which carries SR 63 and SR 106 south of the intersection and SR 184 to the north. US 123 passes the Toccoa Amtrak station and intersects SR 17 Alternate (Big A Road), where the center turn lane ends. The highway passes Toccoa Airport and veers away from the railroad on the eastern edge of the city. US 123 passes by the historic site Travelers Rest before crossing the Tugaloo River branch of Lake Hartwell into Oconee County, South Carolina.

=== South Carolina ===
The highway parallels the left bank of the lake to the mouth of the Chauga River, then curves north and crosses over the Greenville District before entering the town of Westminster, where the highway intersects US 76 (North Avenue).

US 123 and US 76 head east on Windsor Street, meet the western end of SC 183 (Westminster Highway), and temporarily expand to a four-lane divided highway as they pass under the rail line. The U.S. Highways reduce to two lanes to pass through downtown Westminster, which includes the historic Southern Railway Passenger Station. At the east end of downtown, US 123 and US 76 veer onto Main Street, which becomes a four-lane road with center turn lane. The highways meet the northern end of SC 24 (West Oak Highway) in the eastern part of town. The U.S. Highways' name changes to Sandifer Boulevard as they leave Westminster and expand to a four-lane divided highway. The highways have a partial cloverleaf interchange with SC 11 (Cherokee Foothills Scenic Highway) and cross to the north side of the railroad, then become a four-lane road with center turn lane as they enter the town of Seneca. US 123 and US 76 intersect SC 28 (Blue Ridge Boulevard) and SC 59 (1st North Street), which head north and south, respectively, from the intersection. US 123, US 76, and SC 28 head east concurrently along the north side of Seneca south of Lake Keowee. The highways have a partial cloverleaf interchange with Pine Street before intersecting SC 130, which heads southwest along 1st North Street and northeast along Rochester Highway.

US 123, US 76, and SC 28 cross the railroad and continue east from Seneca as Clemson Boulevard, a four-lane divided highway. The highways begin to closely parallel the railroad shortly before they meet the western end of SC 93 (Pendleton Road), which provides access to Clemson University. The highways continue as Tiger Boulevard and, after crossing the Keowee River branch of Lake Hartwell into Pickens County, Calhoun Memorial Highway. In the town of Clemson, the three highways intersect SC 133 (College Avenue) before US 76 and SC 28 turn south onto Anderson Highway. US 123 veers away from the railroad and becomes a freeway at its diamond interchange with SC 93 (Old Greenville Highway). The U.S. Highway has diamond interchanges at Issaqueena Trail, at 18 Mile Road on the edge of the town of Central, and at Ruhamah Road (identified as ROAD 17 on directional signs), US 178 (Moorefield Memorial Highway), and Cartee Road around the town of Liberty. US 123 enters the city of Easley and has a partial interchange with US 123 Connector (Ross Avenue), which leads west to SC 93; there is no access from northbound US 123 to the westbound connector route. The freeway ends at the highway's diamond interchange with SC 135 (Pendleton Street), which leads to SC 8.

US 123 continues east as a four-lane road with center turn lane to its directional intersection with the eastern end of SC 93 (Greenville Road), where the U.S. Highway becomes a divided highway again and briefly parallels the Greenville District rail line. The highway has a trumpet interchange with SC 153 on the eastern edge of Easley. US 123 has a directional intersection with the western end of SC 124 (Old Easley Highway) at Greenville-Pickens Speedway before the highway crosses the Saluda River into Greenville County. The U.S. Highway continues as New Easley Road along the edge of the Greenville suburb of Parker, then becomes Easley Bridge Road at its diamond interchange with US 25 (White Horse Road). US 123 reduces to a four-lane undivided highway, crosses over CSX's Belton Subdivision, and enters the city of Greenville just west of its intersection with SC 124 (Pendleton Street) and becomes Academy Street. The highway has a grade crossing with a Norfolk Southern rail line and crosses over the Reedy River and the Swamp Rabbit Trail (formerly Greenville and Northern Railway) on the western edge of downtown Greenville. US 123 intersects both directions of SC 183—Buncombe Street eastbound and College Street westbound—adjacent to the Greenville County Museum of Art before curving east to intersect Main Street and US 29 (Church Street). The highway then curves south and reaches its northern terminus at I-385 Business (North Street) a short distance west of the northern terminus of I-385 adjacent to the Bon Secours Wellness Arena.

=== National Highway System ===
The entire length of US 123 is part of the National Highway System, a system of routes determined to be the most important for the nation's economy, mobility, and defense.

== History ==
US 123 replaced all of SC 13 in 1946. SC 13 was SC 17 before 1928.

=== South Carolina Highway 13 ===
SC 13 is a northern continuation of Georgia State Route 13 (SR 13), before the portion of SR 13 north of Gainesville, Georgia was redesigned as the northern extension of SR 365 in around 1990s.

==== SC 13's Greenville alternate route ====
South Carolina Highway 13 Alternate
- Location: Greenville, South Carolina
- Existed: c.1940–c.1950

South Carolina Highway 13 Alternate (SC 13 Alt.) was an alternate route for the original SC 13 (that was replaced by US 123). It existed in Greenville, South Carolina. It was formed around 1940 from SC 250 (now US 25) to SC 13. Approximately 1950, SC 13 Alt. was decommissioned, and US 123 replaced its path.

== Major intersections ==
State	County	Location	mi	km	Destinations	Notes
Georgia	Habersham		0.00	0.00	US 23 south / US 441 south / SR 15 south / SR 365 south – Gainesville, Atlanta, Cornelia	Southern (western) terminus; southern end of SR 365 concurrency; northbound exit and southbound entrance; interchange
Georgia	Habersham		0.51	0.82	SR 17 north to US 23 north / US 441 north (SR 15 north) – Clarkesville, Clayton, Helen, North Georgia Technical College	Southern end of SR 17 concurrency
Georgia	Stephens		6.49	10.44	SR 17 south / SR 184 south to I-85 – Lavonia	Northern end of SR 17 concurrency; southern end of SR 184 concurrency
Georgia	Stephens	Toccoa	9.75	15.69	SR 63 south / SR 106 south / SR 184 north (M.L. King Way / Broad Street) – Clayton, Helen, Carnesville, Toccoa Falls, Toccoa Falls College	Northern terminus of SR 63/SR 106; northern end of SR 184 concurrency
Georgia	Stephens	Toccoa	10.83	17.43	SR 17 Alt. (Big A Road) to I-85 – Lavonia, Toccoa Falls	
Tugaloo River			17.70 0.00	28.49 0.00	Lake Hartwell – Georgia–South Carolina state line; northern terminus of SR 365; northern end of SR 365 concurrency	
South Carolina	Oconee		2.80	4.51	Cleveland Pike Road south	Goes back to Georgia SR 184 south
South Carolina	Oconee	Westminster	10.27	16.53	US 76 west (Long Creek Highway) – Clayton, Long Creek, Chau-Ram County Park	Southern end of US 76 concurrency
South Carolina	Oconee	Westminster	10.50	16.90	SC 183 north (Westminster Highway) – Walhalla	Southern terminus of SC 183
South Carolina	Oconee	Westminster	11.57	18.62	SC 24 east (West Oak Highway) to I-85 – Townville, Oakway	Western terminus of SC 24
South Carolina	Oconee		14.50	23.34	SC 11 to I-85 – Walhalla, World of Energy	Interchange
South Carolina	Oconee	Seneca	18.60	29.93	SC 28 west (Blue Ridge Boulevard) / SC 59 south (West North First Street) – Walhalla, Seneca	Southern end of SC 28 concurrency
South Carolina	Oconee	Seneca	19.90	32.03	Northampton Road / North Pine Street	Interchange
South Carolina	Oconee	Seneca	21.04	33.86	SC 130 (Rochester Highway / East North First Street) – Newry, Salem, Seneca, Historic Downtown Seneca	
South Carolina	Oconee		25.40	40.88	SC 93 east – Clemson, Clemson University, SC Botanical Garden, CU Conference Center, Oconee County Airport	Western terminus of SC 93
South Carolina	Pickens	Clemson	27.29	43.92	SC 133 north (College Avenue) – Six Mile, Clemson, Clemson University, John C. Calhoun Home	Southern terminus of SC 133
South Carolina	Pickens	Clemson	27.67	44.53	US 76 east / SC 28 east (Anderson Highway) to I-85 – Anderson, John C. Calhoun Home	Northern end of US 76 and SC 28 concurrencies
South Carolina	Pickens	Clemson	28.43	45.75	SC 93 – Clemson, Central, Norris	Interchange; southern end of freeway
South Carolina	Pickens	Clemson	29.93	48.17	Issaqueena Trail	
South Carolina	Pickens	Central	32.09	51.64	To SC 88 / Road 18 – Central, Pendleton	
South Carolina	Pickens		36.60	58.90	Road 27 – Liberty	
South Carolina	Pickens		39.12	62.96	US 178 – Liberty, Anderson	
South Carolina	Pickens		40.42	65.05	Cartee Road	
South Carolina	Pickens	Easley	44.00	70.81	Ross Avenue west (US 123 Conn. west) to SC 93 – Liberty, Norris	Southbound exit and northbound entrance; eastern terminus of US 123 Conn. and Ross Avenue
South Carolina	Pickens	Easley	44.34	71.36	SC 8 / SC 135 – Pelzer, Easley	Interchange; northern end of freeway
South Carolina	Pickens	Easley	46.38	74.64	SC 93 west (East Main Street) – Easley, Pickens	No left turn northbound; eastern terminus of SC 93
South Carolina	Pickens	Easley	47.93	77.14	SC 153 south to I-85	Interchange
South Carolina	Pickens		50.04	80.53	SC 124 east (Old Easley Highway) – Parker	No northbound entrance; western terminus of SC 124
South Carolina	Greenville	Welcome–Parker line	53.21	85.63	US 25 to I-85	Interchange
South Carolina	Greenville	Greenville	55.06	88.61	SC 124 (Pendleton Road)	
South Carolina	Greenville	Greenville	56.11	90.30	Broad Street	Interchange; southbound exit only
South Carolina	Greenville	Greenville	56.55	91.01	SC 183 west (College Street)	Eastern terminus of SC 183
South Carolina	Greenville	Greenville	57.19	92.04	US 29 (North Church Street)	
South Carolina	Greenville	Greenville	57.42	92.41	East North Street (I-385 Bus.) to I-385 – Columbia, Spartanburg	Northern (eastern) terminus
1.000 mi = 1.609 km; 1.000 km = 0.621 mi: Concurrency terminus; Incomplete access

== Special routes ==
=== Seneca business loop ===
U.S. Highway 123 Business
- Location: Seneca, South Carolina
- Length: 3.1 mi (5.0 km)
- Existed: 1958–2000

U.S. Route 123 Business (US 123 Bus) was established in 1958 as a renumbering of mainline US 123 through downtown Seneca, via North 1st Street. It was decommissioned in 2000, renumbered as part of SC 59 and SC 130.

=== Easley business loop ===
U.S. Highway 123 Business
- Location: Easley, South Carolina
- Length: 3.5 mi (5.6 km)
- Existed: 1958–1964

U.S. Route 123 Business (US 123 Bus) was established in 1958 as a renumbering of mainline US 123 through downtown Easley, via Liberty Drive and Main Street. It was decommissioned in 1963 when mainline US 123 was rerouted further south along new freeway; the alignment was renumbered as part of SC 93.

=== Easley connector route ===
U.S. Highway 123 Connector
- Location: Easley, South Carolina
- Length: 0.740 mi (1,191 m)

U.S. Route 123 Connector (US 123 Conn.) is a 0.740-mile (1.191 km) connector route in the west-central part of Easley that connects SC 93 (Greenville Highway / Liberty Drive) with US 123 (Calhoun Memorial Highway). The connector route is not signed along SC 93 or US 123, but there is signage along its actual path. The entire length is known as Ross Avenue.

US 123 Conn. and Ross Avenue begin at an intersection with SC 93 mainline and travel to the east. Immediately, they curve to the southeast. They curve back to the east just before reaching their eastern terminus, an intersection with US 123.

=== Greenville alternate route ===
U.S. Highway 123 Alternate
- Location: Greenville, South Carolina
- Existed: 1950–1972
