= South Carolina Highway 133 =

State highway in South Carolina, United States

South Carolina Highway 133

Route information
- Maintained by SCDOT
- Length: 20.540 mi (33.056 km)
- Existed: 1960s–present

Major junctions
- South end: US 76 / US 123 / SC 28 in Clemson
- SC 137 in Six Mile; SC 183 near Six Mile
- North end: SC 11 near Sunset

Location
- Country: United States
- State: South Carolina
- Counties: Pickens

Highway system
- South Carolina State Highway System; Interstate; US; State; Scenic
← SC 130	→ SC 135

South Carolina Highway 133 (SC 133) is a 20.540-mile (33.056 km) state highway in Pickens County, South Carolina, connecting Clemson and western Pickens County with access to the Blue Ridge Mountains and the SC 11 (Cherokee Foothills Scenic Highway).

== Route description ==
The route of SC 133 travels generally in a south–north direction, beginning at an intersection with U.S. Routes 76 (US 76) and 123 and SC 28 in Clemson. SC 133 passes under a Norfolk Southern railway viaduct and leaves the Clemson area, passing by Lake Hartwell. The highway skirts rural areas west of Central before entering the community of Six Mile. North of Six Mile, SC 133 becomes more rural and hilly in nature before terminating at SC 11, near Lake Jocassee and Devils Fork State Park.

Prior to streetscaping activities in downtown Clemson, the route used to include College Avenue and terminated at SC 93 at the front of the campus of Clemson University.

== Junction list ==
The entire route is in Pickens County.

Location	mi	km	Destinations	Notes
Clemson	0.000	0.000	US 76 / US 123 / SC 28 (Tiger Boulevard) / College Avenue south – Seneca, Greenville	Southern terminus; roadway continues as College Avenue.
Six Mile	8.120	13.068	SC 137 south (Norris Highway) – Cateechee, Norris	Southern end of SC 137 concurrency
Six Mile	8.590	13.824	SC 137 north (North Main Street) – Pickens, Six Mile Elementary School	Northern end of SC 137 concurrency
	10.760	17.317	SC 183 (Walhalla Highway) – Walhalla, Pickens, War Path Landing	
Keowee-Toxaway State Park	20.540	33.056	SC 11 (Cherokee Foothills Scenic Highway) – Salem, Tamassee, Table Rock	Northern terminus
1.000 mi = 1.609 km; 1.000 km = 0.621 mi: Concurrency terminus
