= Ray Williams =

Ray or Raymond Williams may refer to:

== Sportspeople ==
=== Football (soccer) ===
- Ray Williams (footballer, born 1930), English football player for Tranmere Rovers
- Ray Williams (footballer, born 1931) (1931–2015), Welsh football player for Wrexham
- Ray Williams (footballer, born 1946), English football player

=== Rugby ===
- Ray Williams (rugby union, born 1927) (1927–2014), Welsh international rugby union winger
- Ray Williams (rugby union coach) (1927–2014), Welsh rugby union coach and administrator
- Ray Williams (rugby league) (20th century), New Zealand rugby league player
- Ray Williams (rugby union, born 1909) (1909–2001), New Zealand international rugby union winger

=== Other sports ===
- Ray Williams (American football) (born 1958), American football player
- Ray Williams (basketball) (1954–2013), basketball player
- Ray Williams (weightlifter) (born 1959), Commonwealth gold medallist
- Ray Williams (bowls) (1951–2016), Welsh lawn bowls player
- Ray Orlando Williams (born 1986), American powerlifter

== Other people ==
- Raymond Williams (1921–1988), British academic
- Ray Williams (businessman) (born 1937), founder of HIH Insurance (Australia)
- Ray Williams (producer) (born 1947), music publicist
- Ray Williams (politician) (born 1960), Australian politician
- Ray Robinson Williams (1899–1987), South Carolina state senator, 1940–1953
- Ray Williams (educator), director of education at the Blanton Museum of Art
