= U.S. Route 178 =

U.S. Highway in North and South Carolina

U.S. Route 178
- US 178 highlighted in red; US 178 Business highlighted in blue

Route information
- Auxiliary route of US 78
- Length: 240.49 mi (387.03 km)
- Tourist routes: SC Heritage Corridor: Discovery Route

Major junctions
- North end: US 64 near Rosman, NC
- I-85 near Anderson, SC; US 76 in Anderson, SC; US 29 in Anderson, SC; US 25 / US 221 / SC 72 in Greenwood, SC; US 378 in Saluda, SC; US 1 in Batesburg-Leesville, SC; I-20 near Batesburg-Leesville, SC; US 21 / US 301 in Orangeburg, SC; I-95 near Bowman, SC; US 15 near St. George, SC
- East end: US 78 near Ridgeville, SC

Location
- Country: United States
- States: North Carolina, South Carolina
- Counties: NC: Transylvania; SC: Pickens, Anderson, Abbeville, Greenwood, Saluda, Lexington, Orangeburg, Dorchester

Highway system
- United States Numbered Highway System; List; Special; Divided
| ← SC 177 | SC | → SC 179 |
| ← NC 177 | NC | → NC 179 |

U.S. Highway 178 (US 178) is a spur of U.S. Highway 78. It currently runs for 240.49 miles (387.03 km) from Dorchester, South Carolina, at U.S. Highway 78 to Rosman, North Carolina, at U.S. Highway 64. It passes through the states of South Carolina and North Carolina. It goes through the cities of Pickens, Anderson, North, Orangeburg, Harleyville, South Carolina and Bowman, South Carolina.

== Route description ==
US 178 has a length of 6.35 miles (10.22 km) in North Carolina and spans 234.14 miles (376.81 km) in South Carolina. The U.S. Highway is a part of the National Highway System from I-85 near Anderson to US 378 in Saluda.

US 178 begins at an intersection with US 64 just west of the town of Rosman within Pisgah National Forest in southern Transylvania County, North Carolina. The two-lane road, which is named Pickens Highway, heads east into the town parallel to the French Broad River. US 178 turns south onto Chestnut Street, crosses the river to leave the town, and turns east again to parallel the river. The highway veers away from the mainstem of the French Broad to follow its Middle Fork south then east, then turns south and climbs to the Eastern Continental Divide at Eastatoe Gap between Burnt Mountain and Indian Camp Mountain. US 178 enters Pickens County, South Carolina, and its name changes to Moorefield Memorial Highway shortly after it begins its curvaceous and steep descent along Eastatoe Creek to Rocky Bottom. There, the U.S. Highway meets the western end of F. Van Clayton Memorial Highway, which leads to the highest point in South Carolina, Sassafras Mountain.

US 178 crosses another ridge into the valley of Reedy Cove Creek, then climbs again to Beasley Gap between Rich Mountain and Horse Mountain. From there, the highway has a sharp and curvy descent to the valley of the Oolenoy River, which it follows east to near its junction with SC 11 (Cherokee Foothills Scenic Highway) at the hamlet of Holly Springs. US 178 curves south at its intersection with SC 288 (Table Rock Road), has a short climb to Mosley Gap between Mosley Mountain and Walnut Cove Mountain, and follows several different creeks through the foothills, which the highway exits as it enters the town of Pickens. The highway expands to four lanes and enters the town on Ann Street and has a very brief concurrency with SC 183 (Main Street) in the center of town; SC 183 connects US 178 with SC 8. US 178 leaves the town along Pendleton Street and drops to two lanes again south of town. The highway passes Pickens County Airport on its way to Liberty. The U.S. Highway, which enters the town along Pickens Drive, intersects SC 93 (Main Street) in the center of the town and has a grade crossing of Norfolk Southern Railway's Greenville District as it leaves town along Anderson Drive. Just south of the town limits, US 178 has a diamond interchange with US 123 (Calhoun Memorial Highway).

US 178 meets the southern end of SC 135 shortly before entering Anderson County, where the highway becomes Liberty Highway and intersects SC 88 (Old Greenville Highway) at a roundabout. The highway crosses the Six and Twenty Creek arm of Lake Hartwell and temporarily expands to four lanes around its intersection with SC 28 Bypass, which feeds into SC 28's western bypass of Anderson, Pearman Dairy Road. US 178 gradually approaches US 76 and SC 28 Business (Clemson Boulevard) as it enters a commercial area before meeting and joining those highways at an oblique intersection. The three highways follow an undivided highway with three southbound lanes, two northbound lanes, and a center turn lane into the city of Anderson, where the road's name changes to Main Street and passes to the east of the Civic Center of Anderson. South of Anderson Mall, SC 28 Business continues on Main Street while US 178 and US 76 veer onto four-lane North Avenue, which parallels Main Street on the west. Shortly after North Avenue splits into one-way carriageways split by a wide parked median, the avenue veers east toward Main Street and the U.S. Highways continue along Club Drive and Park Drive, which have several sports field in their wide median.

US 178 and US 76 enter downtown Anderson along four-lane Murray Avenue, which runs one block to the west of Main Street. After splitting from US 76, US 178 travels southeast to the towns of Honea Path, Donalds, and Hodges, before intersecting US 221 in Greenwood.

US 178 then travels further south, intersecting I-20 near Batesburg-Leesville. It then travels through Orangeburg and Summerville before terminating at an intersection with its parent route near the rural town of Ridgeville, SC.

US 178 is signed north–south in North Carolina and east–west in South Carolina; which is why it is listed as having a northern and eastern terminus.

== Future ==
NCDOT plans to modernize a 5.85-mile (9.41 km) section of US 178, between Rosman and the South Carolina state line. The project includes widening lanes to 12 feet (3.7 m), from the current 9 feet (2.7 m), adjust its alignment and add a climbing lane. At an estimated cost of $14.1 million, it is currently unfunded.

== Junction list ==
| State | County | Location | mi | km | Destinations | Notes |
|---|---|---|---|---|---|---|
| North Carolina | Transylvania | Rosman | 0.00 | 0.00 | US 64 – Brevard, Cashiers | Northern terminus |
| | | | 6.35 0.00 | 10.22 0.00 | North Carolina–South Carolina state line | |
| South Carolina | Pickens | | 10.46 | 16.83 | SC 11 (Cherokee Foothills Scenic Highway) – Cleveland, Salem | |
| South Carolina | Pickens | | 10.69 | 17.20 | SC 288 east (Table Rock Road) – Pumpkintown | Western terminus of SC 298 |
| South Carolina | Pickens | Pickens | 19.14 | 30.80 | SC 183 west (Main Street) – Walhalla | Western end of SC 183 concurrency |
| South Carolina | Pickens | Pickens | 19.16 | 30.84 | SC 183 east (Main Street) to SC 8 – Greenville, Easley, Pumpkintown | Eastern end of SC 183 concurrency |
| South Carolina | Pickens | Liberty | 26.02 | 41.88 | SC 93 (Main Street) – Easley, Norris | |
| South Carolina | Pickens | Liberty | 27.57 | 44.37 | US 123 (Calhoun Memorial Highway) – Greenville, Clemson | Diamond interchange |
| South Carolina | Pickens | | 30.17 | 48.55 | SC 135 north (Anderson Highway) – Easley | Southern terminus of SC 135 |
| South Carolina | Anderson | | 33.14 | 53.33 | SC 88 (Old Greenville Highway) – Pendleton, Powdersville | |
| South Carolina | Anderson | Northlake | 43.15 | 69.44 | I-85 – Greenville, Atlanta | I-85 exit 21 |
| South Carolina | Anderson | Northlake | 44.49 | 71.60 | SC 28 Truck south (US 178 Conn. west) to SC 28 – Starr, Abbeville | Eastern terminus of US 178 Conn.; northern terminus of SC 28 Truck |
| South Carolina | Anderson | Anderson | 45.28 | 72.87 | US 76 west / SC 28 Bus. north (Clemson Boulevard) – Clemson | Western end of US 76 and SC 28 Bus. concurrencies |
| South Carolina | Anderson | Anderson | 46.52 | 74.87 | SC 28 Bus. south (Main Street) | Eastern end of SC 28 Bus. concurrency |
| South Carolina | Anderson | Anderson | 48.80 | 78.54 | US 29 Bus. / SC 81 north (Greenville Street) – Greenville | Western end of US 29 Bus./SC 81 concurrency |
| South Carolina | Anderson | Anderson | 49.18 | 79.15 | SC 24 west (Whitner Street) – Westminster | Eastern terminus of SC 24 |
| South Carolina | Anderson | Anderson | 49.43 | 79.55 | US 29 Bus. / SC 81 south (Murray Avenue) – Homeland Park | Eastern end of US 29 Bus./SC 81 concurrency |
| South Carolina | Anderson | Anderson | 49.51 | 79.68 | SC 28 Bus. – Main Street | |
| South Carolina | Anderson | Anderson | 50.85 | 81.84 | US 29 south (Shockley Ferry Road) – Homeland Park | Western end of US 29 concurrency |
| South Carolina | Anderson | Anderson | 51.43 | 82.77 | US 29 north – Greenville | Eastern end of US 29 concurrency |
| South Carolina | Anderson | | 54.78 | 88.16 | SC 252 east (Honea Path Highway) – Honea Path | Eastbound exit and westbound entrance |
| South Carolina | Anderson | | 58.01 | 93.36 | SC 413 south – Iva | Northern terminus of SC 413 |
| South Carolina | Anderson | Belton | 60.45 | 97.28 | SC 20 south (Brown Avenue) – Due West | Western end of SC 20 concurrency |
| South Carolina | Anderson | Belton | 60.52 | 97.40 | SC 20 north (Main Street) to SC 247 – Williamston, Ware Place | Eastern end of SC 20 concurrency |
| South Carolina | Anderson | Honea Path | 68.73 | 110.61 | SC 252 west (Greer Street) – Anderson | Western end of SC 252 concurrency |
| South Carolina | Anderson | Honea Path | 68.79 | 110.71 | US 76 / SC 252 east (Greer Street) – Laurens, Ware Shoals | Eastern end of US 76 and SC 252 concurrencies |
| South Carolina | Abbeville | Donalds | 74.39 | 119.72 | SC 184 east (East Main Street) – Ware Shoals | Western end of SC 184 concurrency |
| South Carolina | Abbeville | Donalds | 74.44 | 119.80 | SC 184 west (West Main Street) – Due West | Eastern end of SC 184 concurrency |
| South Carolina | Greenwood | | 77.42 | 124.60 | SC 420 east – Ware Shoals | Western terminus of SC 420 |
| South Carolina | Greenwood | Hodges | 83.57 | 134.49 | SC 246 east (Emerson Street) – Cokesbury | Western terminus of SC 246 |
| South Carolina | Greenwood | Hodges | 84.14 | 135.41 | SC 185 west (Main Street) – Due West | Eastern terminus of SC 185 |
| South Carolina | Greenwood | Hodges | 84.18 | 135.47 | US 25 north – Greenville | Western end of US 25 concurrency |
| South Carolina | Greenwood | Greenwood | 90.23 | 145.21 | US 25 Bus. south / US 178 Bus. east (Montague Avenue) / SC 72 west – Abbeville | Western end of SC 72 concurrency; northern terminus of US 25 Bus.; western terminus of US 178 Bus. |
| South Carolina | Greenwood | Greenwood | 90.87 | 146.24 | SC 254 (Cokesbury Road / Grace Street) – Cokesbury | |
| South Carolina | Greenwood | Greenwood | 92.39 | 148.69 | US 221 north / SC 72 east / SC 72 Bus. west (Reynolds Avenue) – Laurens, Clinton | Eastern end of SC 72 concurrency; western end of US 221 concurrency; eastern terminus of SC 72 Bus. |
| South Carolina | Greenwood | Greenwood | 93.61 | 150.65 | (Cambridge Avenue) -- Ninety Six, Uptown Greenwood | |
| South Carolina | Greenwood | Greenwood | 95.89 | 154.32 | SC 34 (Ninety Six Highway / Main Street West) – Ninety Six | Partial cloverleaf interchange |
| South Carolina | Greenwood | Greenwood | 97.12 | 156.30 | US 221 south / US 25 Bus. north / US 178 Bus. west (Main Street north) – McCormick | Eastern end of US 221 concurrency; southern terminus of US 25 Bus.; eastern terminus of US 178 Bus. |
| South Carolina | Greenwood | | 98.29 | 158.18 | SC 225 north – Abbeville | Southern terminus of SC 225 |
| South Carolina | Greenwood | | 98.83 | 159.05 | SC 67 south (Callison Highway) | Northern terminus of SC 67 |
| South Carolina | Greenwood | | 99.97 | 160.89 | US 25 south – Edgefield | Eastern end of US 25 concurrency |
| South Carolina | Greenwood | | 104.41 | 168.03 | SC 248 north – Ninety Six | Southern terminus of SC 248 |
| South Carolina | Greenwood | | 110.65 | 178.07 | SC 246 north – Ninety Six | Southern terminus of SC 246 |
| South Carolina | Saluda | Saluda | 121.93 | 196.23 | SC 39 north (Jefferson Street) – Cross Hill | Western end of SC 39 concurrency |
| South Carolina | Saluda | Saluda | 122.02 | 196.37 | SC 121 north (North Main Street north) / Travis Avenue east (US 178 Conn. east) to US 378 / SC 194 east – Newberry, Columbia | Western end of SC 121 concurrency; western terminus of US 178 Conn. |
| South Carolina | Saluda | Saluda | 122.37 | 196.94 | US 378 (Church Street) – McCormick | |
| South Carolina | Saluda | Saluda | 122.57 | 197.26 | SC 121 south (Main Street) – Johnston | Eastern end of SC 121 concurrency |
| South Carolina | Saluda | Saluda | 124.04 | 199.62 | SC 39 south (Ridge Spring Highway) – Ridge Spring | Eastern end of SC 39 concurrency |
| South Carolina | Lexington | Batesburg-Leesville | 137.50 | 221.28 | SC 23 west (Church Street) – Monetta | Western end of SC 23 concurrency |
| South Carolina | Lexington | Batesburg-Leesville | 137.61 | 221.46 | SC 23 east (Church Street) / SC 391 north (Line Street) – Lexington, Prosperity | Eastern end of SC 23 concurrency; western end of SC 391 concurrency |
| South Carolina | Lexington | Batesburg-Leesville | 137.89 | 221.91 | US 1 (Columbia Avenue) – Columbia, Aiken | |
| South Carolina | Lexington | Batesburg-Leesville | 138.27 | 222.52 | SC 391 south (Willis Street) – Wagener | Eastern end of SC 391 concurrency |
| South Carolina | Lexington | Batesburg-Leesville | 140.78 | 226.56 | SC 245 north (Lee Street) | Southern terminus of SC 245 |
| South Carolina | Lexington | | 146.13 | 235.17 | I-20 – Columbia, Augusta | I-20 exit 39 |
| South Carolina | Lexington | | 152.72 | 245.78 | SC 113 south (Wagener Highway) – Wagener | Northern terminus of SC 113 |
| South Carolina | Lexington | Pelion | 160.38 | 258.11 | SC 302 (Pine Street) – South Congaree, Wagener | |
| South Carolina | Lexington | | 168.93 | 271.87 | SC 3 (Whetstone Road) – Swansea, Springfield | |
| South Carolina | Orangeburg | North | 174.03 | 280.07 | SC 394 west (Salley Road) – Salley | Eastern terminus of SC 394 |
| South Carolina | Orangeburg | North | 174.80 | 281.31 | US 321 (Main Street) – Woodford, Livingston, Neeses | |
| South Carolina | Orangeburg | | 178.24 | 286.85 | SC 172 east (Bull Swamp Road) to SC 692 north – St. Matthews, Swansea | Western terminus of SC 172 |
| South Carolina | Orangeburg | Orangeburg | 190.67 | 306.85 | US 178 Bus. east (Broughton Street) | Western terminus of US 178 Bus. |
| South Carolina | Orangeburg | Orangeburg | 191.75 | 308.59 | US 21 north / US 21 Bus. south (Columbia Road) – Columbia | Western end of US 21 concurrency; northern terminus of US 21 Bus. |
| South Carolina | Orangeburg | Orangeburg | 192.84 | 310.35 | US 601 (Magnolia Street) – St. Matthews, Bamberg | |
| South Carolina | Orangeburg | Orangeburg | 193.69 | 311.71 | SC 33 (Russell Street) – Cameron | |
| South Carolina | Orangeburg | Orangeburg | 194.79 | 313.48 | US 301 (Five Chop Road) – Santee, Bamberg | |
| South Carolina | Orangeburg | Orangeburg | 196.11 | 315.61 | US 21 south (Chestnut Street) / US 178 Bus. west (Charleston Highway) to US 21 Bus. / SC 4 – Rowesville, Neeses | Eastern end of US 21 concurrency; eastern terminus of US 178 Bus. |
| South Carolina | Orangeburg | Bowman | 209.55 | 337.24 | SC 210 south (Bowman Branch Highway) – Branchville | Western end of SC 210 concurrency |
| South Carolina | Orangeburg | Bowman | 209.67 | 337.43 | SC 210 north (Vance Road) – Vance | Eastern end of SC 210 concurrency |
| South Carolina | Dorchester | | 218.29 | 351.30 | I-95 – Florence, Savannah | I-95 exit 82 |
| South Carolina | Dorchester | | 220.95 | 355.58 | US 15 – St. George, Santee | |
| South Carolina | Dorchester | Harleyville | 226.11 | 363.89 | SC 453 north (Judge Street) – Holly Hill | Southern terminus of SC 453 |
| | Dorchester | 234.14 | 376.81 | US 78 – Summerville, St. George | Eastern terminus | |
1.000 mi = 1.609 km; 1.000 km = 0.621 mi: Concurrency terminus; Incomplete access

== Special routes ==
=== Northlake connector ===
U.S. Highway 178 Connector
- Location: Northlake, South Carolina
- Length: 0.180 mi (290 m)

U.S. Route 178 Connector (US 178 Conn.) is a 0.180-mile (0.290 km) connector route of US 178 entirely within the southern part of Northlake. It connects US 76, South Carolina Highway 28 (SC 28), and SC 28 Business (SC 28 Bus.) with US 178 (Liberty Highway). It is an unsigned highway.

=== Greenwood business loop ===
U.S. Highway 178 Business
- Location: Greenwood, South Carolina
- Length: 4.840 mi (7.789 km)
- Tourist routes: South Carolina Heritage Corridor: Discovery Route

U.S. Route 178 Business (US 178 Bus.) is a 4.840-mile (7.789 km) business route of US 178 in Greenwood. Nearly the entire path is within the city limits of Greenwood. It shares a concurrency with US 25 Bus. for its entire length, the SC Discovery Route, and SC 34.

| County | Location | mi | km | Destinations | Notes |
|---|---|---|---|---|---|
| Greenwood | Greenwood | 0.000 | 0.000 | US 25 / US 178 / SC 72 / US 25 Bus. begins – Abbeville, Greenville, Anderson | Western Terminus; Northern Terminus of US 25 Bus. |
| Greenwood | Greenwood | 1.428 | 2.298 | SC 72 Bus. – Clinton, Abbeville | Western end of SC Discovery Route concurrency |
| Greenwood | Greenwood | 1.756 | 2.826 | Seaboard Avenue | Eastern end of SC Discovery Route concurrency |
| Greenwood | Greenwood | 1.816 | 2.923 | SC 34 begins / SC 10 west – Promised Land, McCormick | Western terminus of SC 34; Western end of SC 34 Concurrency (unsigned concurrency) |
| Greenwood | Greenwood | 3.413 | 5.493 | SC 34 east – Ninety Six | Eastern end of SC 34 Concurrency (SC 34 signage begins) |
| Greenwood | Greenwood | 4.840 | 7.789 | US 25 / US 178 / US 221 / US 25 Bus. ends – Edgefield, Saluda, McCormick | Eastern terminus; Southern terminus of US 25 Bus. |
| Greenwood | Greenwood | 1.000 mi = 1.609 km; 1.000 km = 0.621 mi: Concurrency terminus | | | |

=== Saluda connector ===
U.S. Highway 178 Connector
- Location: Saluda, South Carolina
- Length: 0.190 mi (306 m)

U.S. Route 178 Connector (US 178 Conn.) is a 0.190-mile (0.306 km) connector route of US 178 that is entirely within the city limits of Saluda. It serves to connect US 178, South Carolina Highway 39 (SC 39), and SC 121 with US 378 and SC 194. It is known as Travis Avenue and is an unsigned highway.

=== Orangeburg business loop ===
U.S. Highway 178 Business
- Location: Orangeburg, South Carolina
- Length: 4.400 mi (7.081 km)

U.S. Route 178 Business (US 178 Bus.) is a 4.400-mile (7.081 km) business route of US 178 in the western part of the city of Orangeburg.

| County | Location | mi | km | Destinations | Notes |
|---|---|---|---|---|---|
| Orangeburg | Orangeburg | 0.000 | 0.000 | US 178 (Chestnut Street Northeast) – North | Western Terminus |
| Orangeburg | Orangeburg | 3.012 | 4.847 | SC 33 (Russell Street) – Cameron | |
| Orangeburg | Orangeburg | 3.245 | 5.222 | US 301 / US 601 (John C. Calhoun Drive) – Santee, Bamberg | |
| Orangeburg | Orangeburg | 4.221 | 6.793 | US 21 Bus. north (Magnolia Street) – Saint Matthews, Columbia | Western end of US 21 Concurrency |
| Orangeburg | Orangeburg | 4.374 | 7.039 | US 21 Bus. south (Rowesville Road) to SC 4 west – Walterboro, Savannah | Eastern end of US 21 Bus. Concurrency |
| Orangeburg | Orangeburg | 4.400 | 7.081 | US 21 / US 178 (Charleston Highway) / US 601 Truck (Chestnut Street Southwest) – Walterboro, Bowman, Charleston, Columbia, Savannah | Eastern terminus |
| Orangeburg | Orangeburg | 1.000 mi = 1.609 km; 1.000 km = 0.621 mi: Concurrency terminus | | | |

== See also ==
- List of United States Numbered Highways
