= South Carolina Highway 137 =

State highway in South Carolina, United States

South Carolina Highway 137

Route information
- Maintained by SCDOT
- Length: 8.410 mi (13.535 km)

Major junctions
- South end: SC 93 in Norris
- SC 133 in Six Mile
- North end: SC 183 near Six Mile

Location
- Country: United States
- State: South Carolina
- Counties: Pickens

Highway system
- South Carolina State Highway System; Interstate; US; State; Scenic
← SC 135	→ SC 145

South Carolina Highway 137 (SC 137) is a 8.410-mile-long (13.535 km) state highway in the U.S. state of South Carolina. The highway connects Norris with rural areas of Pickens, via Six Mile.

== Route description ==
SC 137 begins at an intersection with SC 93 (Norris Drive) in Norris, within Pickens County, where the roadway continues as East Jamison Street. It travels to the northwest and crosses over Twelve Mile Creek just north of Cateechee. In Six Mile, the highway intersects SC 133 (South Main Street). The two highways travel concurrently until Six Mile Cemetery, where SC 133 splits off onto Mt. Olivet Road. SC 137 travels to the north-northeast. It passes Six Mile Elementary School on the northeastern edge of the town. A short distance later, it meets its northern terminus, an intersection with SC 183 (Walhalla Highway).

== Major intersections ==
The entire route is in Pickens County.

Location	mi	km	Destinations	Notes
Norris	0.000	0.000	SC 93 (Norris Drive) – Central, Clemson, Liberty	
Six Mile	4.870	7.838	SC 133 south (South Main Street) – Clemson	Southern end of SC 133 concurrency
Six Mile	5.340	8.594	SC 133 north (Mt. Olivet Road) – Keowee Toxaway, Walhalla	Northern end of SC 133 concurrency
	8.410	13.535	SC 183 (Walhalla Highway) – Walhalla, Pickens	
1.000 mi = 1.609 km; 1.000 km = 0.621 mi: Concurrency terminus
