= South Carolina Highway 93 =

State highway in South Carolina, United States

South Carolina Highway 93

Route information
- Maintained by SCDOT
- Length: 19.760 mi (31.801 km)
- Existed: 1964–present

Major junctions
- West end: US 76 / SC 28 in Clemson
- US 123 near Clemson; US 178 in Liberty
- East end: US 123 in Easley

Location
- Country: United States
- State: South Carolina
- Counties: Pickens

Highway system
- South Carolina State Highway System; Interstate; US; State; Scenic
← SC 92	→ I-95

South Carolina Highway 93 (SC 93) is a 19.760-mile (31.801 km) primary state highway in the U.S. state of South Carolina. It travels from U.S. Route 76 (US 76) and SC 28 in Clemson northeast to US 123 in Easley.

== Route description ==
The highway begins at an interchange with the US 76/SC 28 concurrency and Old Greenville Highway east of downtown Clemson. West of this point, Old Greenville Highway passes through downtown Clemson and the campus of Clemson University and is signed as SC 93 though it is not officially part of the highway. SC 93 heads northeast exiting the city, it then has an interchange with US 123. It then runs through Central to Norris, where it meets SC 137. From Norris, the road continues northeast into Liberty. In downtown Liberty, SC 93 intersects US 178. After leaving Liberty, the highway continues toward Easley. As it enters Easley on Liberty Drive, it promptly meets SC 8, after which it enters downtown on West Main Street. Here, it intersects with SC 135 and becomes East Main Street. After leaving downtown, SC 93 meets US 123 one last time, where its northern terminus lies.

== History ==
SC 93 is the original alignment of US 123 from Clemson to Easley. When US 123 was given a bypass to the south of Easley in 1958, it was US 123 Business. Between 1962 and 1964, a new freeway was built to carry US 123 from Easley to Clemson. When this was finished, all of former US 123 from Easley to Clemson was renumbered as today's SC 93.

== Major intersections ==
The entire route is in Pickens County.

Location	mi	km	Destinations	Notes
Clemson	0.000– 0.020	0.000– 0.032	US 76 / SC 28 to Old Greenville Highway / I-85 – Seneca, Anderson, Clemson University	Western terminus; interchange
Clemson	0.608	0.978	US 123 – Greenville, Seneca	Interchange
Norris	7.134	11.481	SC 137 north (Norris Highway) / North Jamison Street – Cateechee, Six Mile	Southern terminus of SC 137
Liberty	11.291	18.171	US 178 (Pickens Drive / Anderson Drive) – Pickens, Anderson	
Easley	16.139	25.973	Ross Avenue (US 123 Conn. east) to US 123 – Greenville	No access from SC 93 west to US 123 Conn.; western terminus of US 123 Conn. and Ross Avenue
Easley	17.000	27.359	SC 8 (South 5th Street / West Main Street) – Pickens, Pelzer	
Easley	17.206	27.690	Folger Avenue west (SC 8 Conn. west)	Eastern terminus of SC 8 Conn. and Folger Avenue
Easley	17.475	28.123	SC 135 (South Pendleton Street / Hill Crest Drive)	
Easley	19.760	31.801	US 123 (Calhoun Memorial Highway) – Greenville, Clemson	Eastern terminus
1.000 mi = 1.609 km; 1.000 km = 0.621 mi: Incomplete access
