= Georgia State Route 63 =

State highway in Georgia, United States

State Route 63
- SR 63 highlighted in red

Route information
- Maintained by Georgia Department of Transportation
- Length: 23.1 mi (37.2 km)

Major junctions
- South end: SR 59 northeast of Commerce, Georgia
- I-85 near Arp
- North end: US 123 / SR 106 / SR 184 / SR 365 in Toccoa

Location
- Country: United States
- State: Georgia
- Counties: Banks, Franklin, Stephens

Highway system
- Georgia State Highway System; Interstate; US; State; Special
← SR 62	→ SR 64

State Route 63 (SR 63) is a 23.1-mile-long (37.2 km) state highway in the northeastern part of the U.S. state of Georgia. It and SR 59 serve to connect Commerce and Toccoa.

== Route description ==
SR 63 begins at an intersection with SR 59, northeast of Commerce. The route travels north-northeastward toward Toccoa. About 1,000 feet (300 m) after its southern terminus, SR 63 has an interchange with Interstate 85 (I-85) in rural Banks County. This interchange is south-southeast of Arp. SR 63 continues to the north-northeast. It has intersections with SR 51, SR 198, and SR 184. The highway crosses the northwestern corner of Franklin County and enters Stephens County. SR 63 intersects SR 106 just north of the Franklin–Stephens county line. The two highways form a concurrency to the north-northeast. On the way to Toccoa, the route has an intersection with SR 17. Just before entering Toccoa, SR 63 has an intersection with SR 145 before traveling northwest and curve to the north until it meets its northern terminus, an intersection with US 123/SR 184/SR 365 in downtown Toccoa. This intersection also marks the northern terminus of SR 106.

== Major intersections ==
County	Location	mi	km	Destinations	Notes
Banks		0.0	0.0	SR 59 – Commerce, Carnesville	Southern terminus
Banks		0.2	0.32	I-85 (SR 403) – Atlanta, Greenville	I-85 exit 154
Banks		5.9	9.5	SR 51 – Homer, Carnesville	
Banks		7.7	12.4	SR 198 – Carnesville	
Banks		10.4	16.7	SR 184 north – Toccoa	Southern terminus of SR 184
Franklin	No major junctions				
Stephens	Mize	14.9	24.0	SR 106 south – Carnesville	Southern end of SR 106 concurrency
Stephens		19.5	31.4	SR 17 (Toccoa Bypass) – Clarkesville, Lavonia	
Stephens		21.3	34.3	SR 145 south – Carnesville	Northern terminus of SR 145
Stephens	Toccoa	23.1	37.2	US 123 / SR 365 (Currahee Street) / SR 184 (Broad Street) / SR 106 south – Clarkesville, Westminster	Northern terminus; northern end of SR 106 concurrency
1.000 mi = 1.609 km; 1.000 km = 0.621 mi: Concurrency terminus
