= South Carolina Highway 183 =

State highway in South Carolina, United States

South Carolina Highway 183

Route information
- Maintained by SCDOT
- Length: 53.712 mi (86.441 km)
- Tourist routes: South Carolina Heritage Corridor: Discovery Route

Major junctions
- South end: US 76 / US 123 in Westminster
- SC 28 in Walhalla; US 178 in Pickens; US 25 near Greenville
- North end: US 123 in Greenville

Location
- Country: United States
- State: South Carolina
- Counties: Oconee, Pickens, Greenville

Highway system
- South Carolina State Highway System; Interstate; US; State; Scenic
← SC 182	→ SC 184

South Carolina Highway 183 (SC 183) is a 53.712-mile (86.441 km) state highway that travels from Westminster to Greenville.

== Route description ==
SC 183 begins at an intersection with U.S. Route 76 (US 76) and US 123 in Westminster. It travels north to Walhalla and then east to meet SC 130 for a short concurrency on Rochester Highway near the Oconee Nuclear Station at Lake Keowee in Seneca in Oconee County. The road, known as East Pickens Highway, moves east by northeast over a tributary that feeds into Lake Hartwell where the road name changes to Walhalla Highway as the highway enters Pickens County, 1.22 mi (1.96 km) eastward. Upon entering Pickens County, the highway travels 4.3 mi (6.9 km) north by northeast before intersecting at SC 133. SC 183 moves 2.1 mi (3.4 km) where it intersects Six Mile Road, the northern terminus of SC 137. Traveling east by northeast on Walhalla Highway, SC 183 goes 5.8 mi (9.3 km) before reaching downtown Pickens, the county seat. SC 183 travels concurrently with US 178 through downtown Pickens on Main street for 0.02 mi (0.032 km) on East Main Street. The highway travels 0.19 mi (0.31 km) where it intersects SC 8. Traveling concurrently with SC 8 for 0.44 mi (0.71 km) northeastward on Jewel Road, SC 183 splits off from SC 8 to become Farrs Bridge Road. SC 183 moves 5.64 mi (9.08 km) where it intersects SC 135 at Dacusville Road. It then moves eastward 8.32 mi (13.39 km) where it intersects US 25 in Greenville County, crossing over the Saluda River in the process. Traveling southeastward for 0.91 mi (1.46 km), SC 183 enters Berea. Once SC 183 passes West Parker Road, the road names changes to Cedar Lane Road, then travels an additional 1.70 mi (2.74 km) to reach West Blue Ridge Drive at SC 253. SC 183 travels an additional 1.79 mi (2.88 km) southeast, becoming Pete Hollis Boulevard, and intersecting Stone Avenue and Rutherford Street. It has a second intersection with US 123 at North Academy Street in downtown Greenville a further 0.41 mi (0.66 km) southeast. Then, it continues to the southeast and reaches its eastern terminus, an intersection with US 29 (Church Street).

== Major intersections ==
County	Location	mi	km	Destinations	Notes
Oconee	Westminster	0.000	0.000	US 76 / US 123 (Windsor Street) – Greenville, Anderson, Toccoa, Clayton	Western terminus
Oconee	Walhalla	7.440	11.974	SC 28 north (Main Street) – Highlands	Western end of SC 28 concurrency
Oconee	Walhalla	7.530	12.118	SC 28 south (Main Street) – Seneca	Eastern end of SC 28 concurrency
Oconee		11.020	17.735	SC 11 (Cherokee Foothills Scenic Highway)	Interchange
Oconee		14.520	23.368	SC 188 south (Keowee School Road) – Seneca	Northern terminus of SC 188
Oconee	Lake Keowee	18.160	29.226	SC 130 north (Stamp Creek Road) – Salem	Western end of SC 130 concurrency
Oconee	Lake Keowee	19.770	31.817	SC 130 south (Rochester Highway) – Seneca	Eastern end of SC 130 concurrency
Pickens		25.120	40.427	SC 133 (Crowe Creek Road) – Six Mile, Nine Times	
Pickens		27.260	43.871	SC 137 south (Six Mile Highway) – Six Mile	Northern terminus of SC 137
Pickens	Pickens	33.740	54.299	US 178 north (Ann Street) – Rosman	Western end of US 178 concurrency
Pickens	Pickens	33.760	54.331	US 178 south (Pendleton Street) – Anderson	Eastern end of US 178 concurrency
Pickens	Pickens	33.970	54.669	SC 8 south (Hampton Avenue) – Easley	Western end of SC 8 concurrency
Pickens	Pickens	34.452	55.445	SC 8 north (Pumpkintown Highway) – Pumpkintown	Eastern end of SC 8 concurrency
Pickens		40.102	64.538	SC 135 (Dacusville Highway) – Easley, Pumpkintown	
Greenville	Berea	48.442	77.960	US 25 (White Horse Road) – Greenwood, Travelers Rest	
Greenville	Parker	51.112	82.257	SC 253 (Blue Ridge Drive) – Easley, Paris Mountain	
Greenville	Greenville	53.302	85.781	US 123 (Academy Street) to I-385 – Bon Secours Wellness Arena, Fluor Field, Falls Park, Greenville Zoo, Peace Center	Provides access to Bon Secours St. Francis – Downtown hospital
Greenville	Greenville	53.712	86.441	US 29 (Church Street) to East North Street east / Beattie Place east / I-185 / I-385 – Anderson, Spartanburg	Eastern terminus; roadway continues as East North Street and Beattie Place.
1.000 mi = 1.609 km; 1.000 km = 0.621 mi
