= Cateechee, South Carolina =

- Census-designated place
- Location within South Carolina Location within the United States
- Coordinates: 34°46′10″N 82°46′36″W
- Country: United States
- State: South Carolina
- County: Pickens

Area
  - Total: 0.52 sq mi (1.35 km^{2})
  - Land: 0.51 sq mi (1.32 km^{2})
  - Water: 0.012 sq mi (0.03 km^{2})
- Elevation: 873 ft (266 m)

Population (2020)
  - Total: 321
  - Density: 628.6/sq mi (242.72/km^{2})
- Time zone: UTC-5 (Eastern (EST))
  - Summer (DST): UTC-4 (EDT)
- ZIP Code: 29630 (Central)
- Area codes: 864, 821
- FIPS code: 45-12520
- GNIS feature ID: 2812986

Cateechee is an unincorporated community and census-designated place (CDP) in Pickens County, South Carolina, United States. It was first listed as a CDP before the 2020 census. The population as of 2020 was 321.

== Geography ==
The CDP is in southwestern Pickens County, on a hillside rising to the south above Twelvemile Creek, a west-flowing tributary of the Seneca River. The community is bordered to the southeast by the town of Norris. South Carolina Highway 137 (Norris Highway) forms the eastern edge of the CDP; the highway leads southeast into Norris and northwest 4 miles (6 km) to the town of Six Mile.

== Demographics ==
Historical population
Census	Pop.	Note	%±
2020	321		—
U.S. Decennial Census; 2020

Cateechee first appeared as a census designated place in the 2020 U.S. census.

=== 2020 census ===
Cateechee CDP, South Carolina – Demographic Profile (NH = Non-Hispanic)
Race / Ethnicity	Pop 2020	% 2020
White alone (NH)	292	90.97%
Black or African American alone (NH)	5	1.56%
Native American or Alaska Native alone (NH)	0	0.00%
Asian alone (NH)	2	0.62%
Pacific Islander alone (NH)	0	0.00%
Some Other Race alone (NH)	0	0.00%
Mixed Race/Multi-Racial (NH)	8	2.49%
Hispanic or Latino (any race)	14	4.36%
Total	321	100.00%

Note: the US Census treats Hispanic/Latino as an ethnic category. This table excludes Latinos from the racial categories and assigns them to a separate category. Hispanics/Latinos can be of any race.
