= Georgia State Route 184 =

State highway in Georgia, United States

State Route 184
- SR 184 highlighted in red

Route information
- Maintained by GDOT
- Length: 19.4 mi (31.2 km)

Major junctions
- South end: SR 63 southwest of Toccoa
- US 123 / SR 17 / SR 365 southwest of Toccoa; US 123 / SR 63 / SR 106 / SR 365 in Toccoa
- North end: Cleveland Pike Road at the South Carolina state line west of Westminster, South Carolina

Location
- Country: United States
- State: Georgia
- Counties: Banks, Franklin, Stephens

Highway system
- Georgia State Highway System; Interstate; US; State; Special
← SR 183	→ I-185

State Route 184 (SR 184) is a 19.4-mile (31.2 km) state highway that runs south-to-north through portions of Banks and Stephens counties in the northeastern part of the U.S. state of Georgia. The route's southern terminus is at SR 63 in northeastern Banks County. The northern terminus at the Tugaloo River and the South Carolina state line where the road continues as Cleveland Pike Road.

== Route description ==
SR 184 begins at an intersection with SR 63 in the northeastern section of Banks County. It travels northwest on Martins Bridge Road briefly until turning right onto Damascus Road. To the north-northeast, the route enters the extreme northwest corner of Franklin County and reaches the meeting point of Banks, Franklin, and Stephens counties. It intersects the southern terminus of SR 105, and then runs along the Franklin–Stephens county line and forms the southern border of the Chattahoochee National Forest.

SR 184, now wholly inside the boundaries of the Chattahoochee National Forest and carrying the name Homer Road, travels north towards the community of Boydville, passing Currahee Mountain at extremely close range. It subsequently makes a right turn at Dicks Hill Parkway and intersects US 123/SR 17/SR 365. US 123/SR 365 begin a concurrency with SR 184, which now bears the name Currahee Street, and travel north into Toccoa, while SR 17 continues to the east. Between Boydville and Toccoa city limits, the road is again the boundary line for the Chattahoochee Forest. In downtown Toccoa, SR 184 leaves the concurrency at the intersection of Currahee Street and Broad Street by turning north onto Broad Street while the other two routes stay on Currahee Street. This intersection is also the northern terminus of SR 63/SR 106, which head south on Broad Street. After passing under the Norfolk Southern Railway underpass, SR 184 turns right onto Tugalo Street forming a wrong-way concurrency with SR 17 Alternate.

After about 0.7 miles (1.1 km), SR 184 turns left onto Prather Bridge Road while SR 17 Alternate continues east on Tugalo Street. As SR 184 leaves Toccoa's city limits, it is again in the Chattahoochee Forest as it travels northeast towards the Tugaloo River. The road crosses into South Carolina on a bridge over the river. Here, SR 184 comes to an end and Cleveland Pike Road continues into Oconee County as a state secondary route.

== Major intersections ==
County	Location	mi	km	Destinations	Notes
Banks		0.0	0.0	SR 63 (Sunshine Church Road) – Commerce, Toccoa	Southern terminus
Franklin	Chattahoochee National Forest	2.5	4.0	SR 105 north (Cannon Road)	Southern terminus of SR 105
Stephens	Chattahoochee National Forest	9.5	15.3	US 123 south / SR 17 / SR 365 south – Lavonia, Clarkesville, Cornelia	Southern end of US 123/SR 365 concurrency
Stephens	Toccoa	12.8	20.6	US 123 north / SR 365 north (East Currahee Street) / SR 63 south / SR 106 south (South Broad Street)	Northern end of US 123/SR 365 concurrency; northern terminus of SR 63/SR 106
Stephens	Toccoa	12.9	20.8	SR 17 Alt. north (Broad Street) – Clarkesville	Southern end of SR 17 Alternate concurrency
Stephens	Toccoa	13.6	21.9	SR 17 Alt. south (East Tugalo Street) – Avalon	Northern end of SR 17 Alternate concurrency
Tugaloo River		19.4	31.2	Cleveland Pike Road north – Madison, Longcreek	Northern terminus at South Carolina state line; roadway continues as Cleveland Pike Road north
1.000 mi = 1.609 km; 1.000 km = 0.621 mi: Concurrency terminus

== Cleveland Pike Road ==
Cleveland Pike Road
- Location: Oconee County, South Carolina
- Length: 6.8 mi (10.9 km)

Cleveland Pike Road is a road located within Oconee County, South Carolina. It runs from the northern terminus of Georgia SR 184 located at the Prather Bridge at the Georgia-South Carolina state line to US 123 southeast of Madison.

Major intersections

The entire route is in Oconee County.

Location	mi	km	Destinations	Notes
	0.0	0.0	SR 184 south – Toccoa	Southern terminus at the Georgia state line at the Tugaloo River; roadway continues as Georgia SR 184 south
	6.8	10.9	US 123 – Westminster, Toccoa	Northern terminus
1.000 mi = 1.609 km; 1.000 km = 0.621 mi
