= Rocky Bottom, South Carolina =

Community in South Carolina, United States

Coordinates: 35°02′45″N 82°48′08″W

Home on Rocky Bottom Creek

Rocky Bottom is an unincorporated community located in northern Pickens County, South Carolina. It is 16 miles (26 km) north of Pickens, South Carolina, 7 miles (11 km) south of Rosman, North Carolina and 27 miles (43 km) northwest of Greenville, South Carolina. Rocky Bottom is near the North Carolina state line, on U.S. Highway 178 in the Blue Ridge Mountains, at an elevation of 1,750 ft (530 m). The Foothills Trail also makes its way through Rocky Bottom, with an area for trailgoer s to park.
