= South Carolina National Heritage Corridor =

United States National Heritage Area in South Carolina

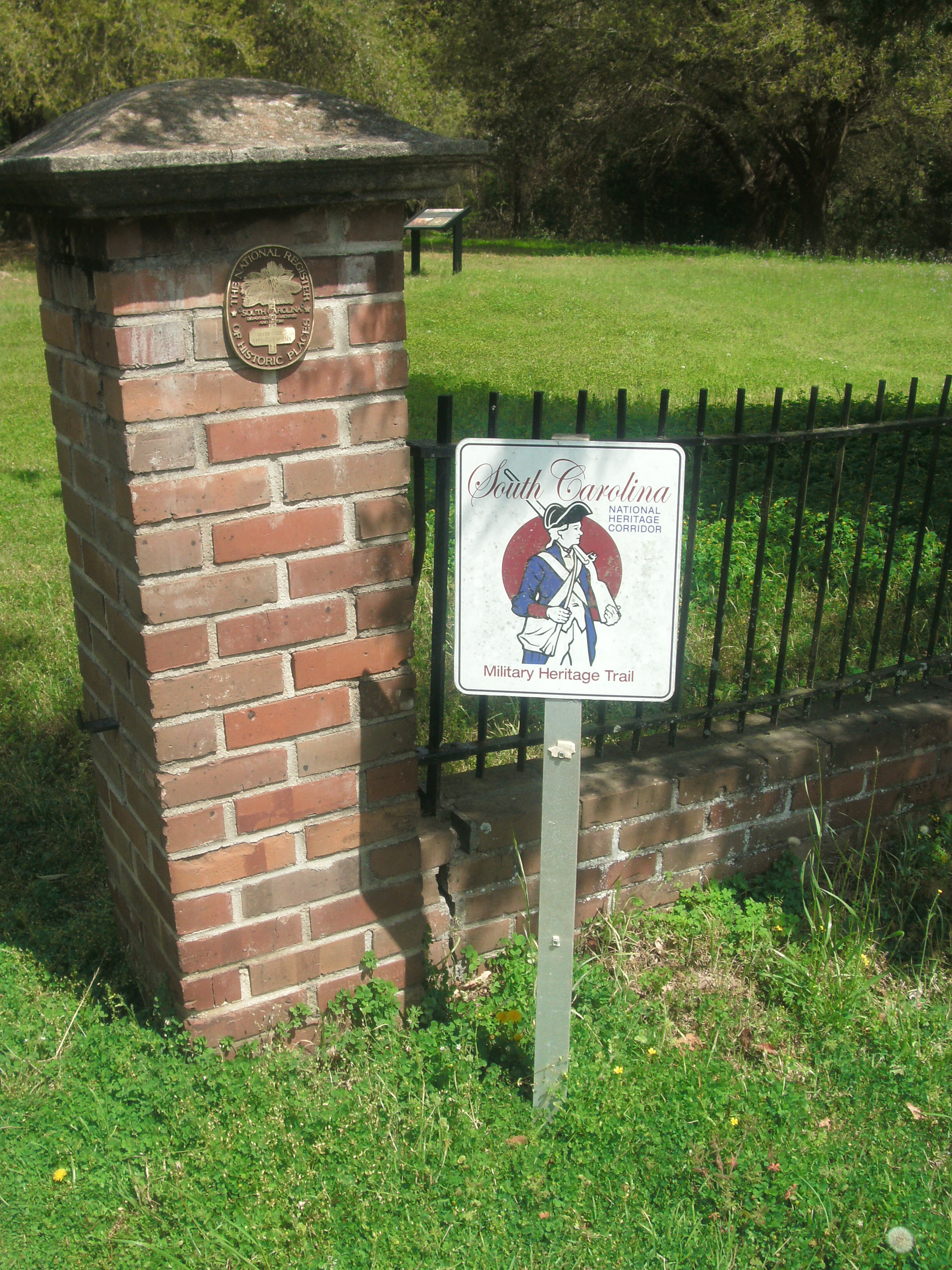
A sign marking the South Carolina National Heritage Corridor at Eutaw Springs Battleground Park

The South Carolina National Heritage Corridor is a federally designated National Heritage Area extending from the Appalachian Mountains to Charleston through seventeen counties of South Carolina. The heritage corridor promotes and interprets the state's history, with emphasis on European settlement, agriculture, Black history, trade routes and the state's ports. Sites associated with the American Revolution and the American Civil War are also included.

The South Carolina National Heritage Corridor was established in 1996.

== Routes ==
The South Carolina Heritage Corridor has two routes that run from Upstate South Carolina to Charleston in the Lowcountry: The Discovery Route and the Nature Route.
