= Pickens County Airport (South Carolina) =

- IATA: LQK; ICAO: KLQK; FAA LID: LQK

Summary
- Airport type: Public
- Owner: Pickens County
- Serves: Pickens, South Carolina
- Elevation AMSL: 1,013 ft / 309 m
- Coordinates: 34°48′36″N 082°42′10″W
- Interactive map of Pickens County Airport

Runways
Direction	Length		Surface
Direction	ft	m	Surface
5/23	5,002	1,525	Asphalt

Statistics (2007)
- Aircraft operations: 40,100
- Based aircraft: 34
- Source: Federal Aviation Administration

Pickens County Airport (IATA: LQK, ICAO: KLQK, FAA LID: LQK) is a county-owned public-use airport located four miles (6 km) south of the central business district of Pickens, in Liberty, South Carolina, United States.

== Facilities and aircraft ==
Pickens County Airport covers an area of 270 acres (110 ha) and contains one runway designated 5/23 with a 5,002 x 100 ft (1,525 x 30 m) asphalt pavement. For the 12-month period ending May 24, 2007, the airport had 40,100 aircraft operations, an average of 109 per day: 97% general aviation, 2% air taxi and <1% military. At that time there were 34 aircraft based at this airport: 79% single-engine, 12% multi-engine, 3% helicopter, 6% ultralight.

== See also ==
- List of airports in South Carolina
