= Pickens County, South Carolina =

County in South Carolina, United States

- County
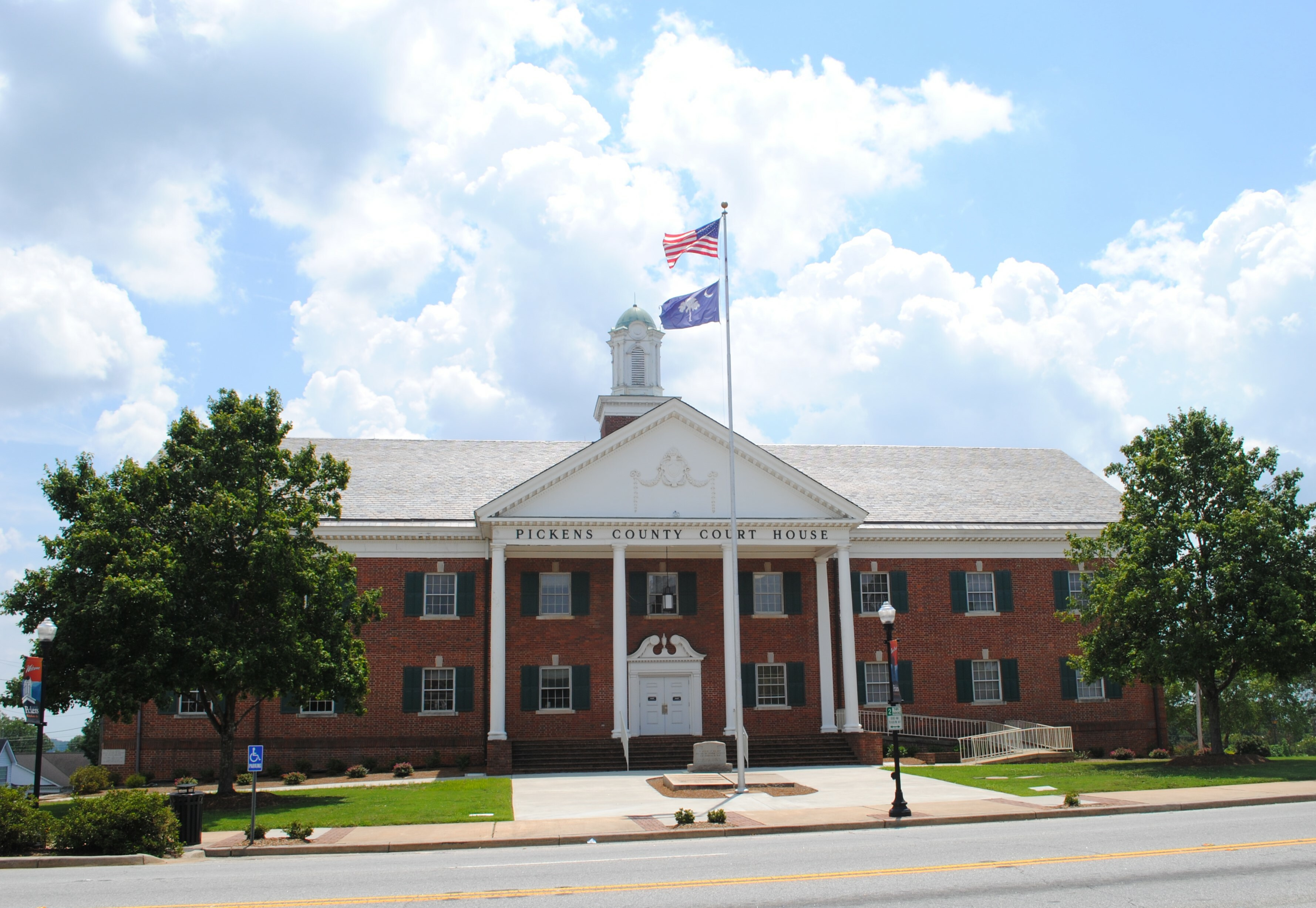
- Pickens County Courthouse

- Seal Logo
- Motto: "Adventure Starts Here"
- Location within the U.S. state of South Carolina
- Coordinates: 34.89°N 82.72°W
- Country: United States
- State: South Carolina
- Founded: 1826
- Named for: Andrew Pickens
- Seat: Pickens
- Largest community: Easley

Area
  - Total: 512.75 sq mi (1,328.0 km^{2})
  - Land: 496.94 sq mi (1,287.1 km^{2})
  - Water: 15.81 sq mi (40.9 km^{2}) 3.67%

Population (2020)
  - Total: 131,404
  - Estimate (2025): 139,198 ▲
  - Density: 264.43/sq mi (102.10/km^{2})
- Time zone: UTC−5 (Eastern)
  - Summer (DST): UTC−4 (EDT)
- Congressional district: 3rd
- Website: www.co.pickens.sc.us

Pickens County is located in the northwest part of the U.S. state of South Carolina. As of the 2020 census, its population was 131,404. Its county seat is Pickens. The county was created in 1826. It is part of the Greenville-Anderson-Greer, SC Metropolitan Statistical Area.

== History ==
Pickens County was part of Cherokee homeland territory until well after the American Revolution. The Cherokee had allied with the British, hoping to gain expulsion of European-American settlers from their lands. But they were defeated in local battles of the Revolution and forced to cede their lands under various treaties.

This former Cherokee territory was included in the new state's Ninety-Six Judicial District. In 1791 the state legislature established Washington District, a judicial area composed of present-day Greenville, Anderson, Pickens, and Oconee counties (the latter was not organized until 1868); at that time it also included Pendleton County.

Streets for the county seat and courthouse town of Pickensville (near present-day Easley) were laid off. New buildings perhaps included a large wooden hotel, which served as a stagecoach stop. In 1798 Washington District was divided into Greenville and Pendleton districts. The latter included what eventually became Anderson, Oconee, and Pickens counties. After a new courthouse was erected at Pendleton to accommodate the Court of General Sessions and Common Pleas, Pickensville began to decline.

In view of the growing population and poor transportation facilities in Pendleton District, the legislature divided it into counties in 1826. But a year later, it decided to establish judicial districts instead. The legislation went into effect in 1828. The lower part became Anderson and the upper Pickens, named in honor of Brigadier General Andrew Pickens of the American Revolution. His home, Hopewell, was on the southern border of the district. A courthouse was established on the west bank of the Keowee River, and a small town called Pickens Court House soon developed here. Since 1825, John C. Calhoun made his home in what became Pickens County, at Fort Hill, which became the basis around which Clemson University would later grow up.

By 1860, Pickens District had a population of more than 19,000 persons, of whom 22 percent were enslaved African Americans. The district was largely rural and agricultural, with cotton the most important commodity crop. Its small industry consisted mainly of sawmills, gristmills, and a few other shops producing goods for home consumption. The district's Protestant churches were numerous, but schools were few. The Blue Ridge Railroad reached the district in September 1860. There was little organized troop combat here during the Civil War, but the district was frequently plundered by marauders and deserters who swept down from the mountains.

=== Post-Civil War to present ===
After the war, the region was largely destitute. The South Carolina Constitutional Convention of 1868, meeting during the first year of Congressional Reconstruction, changed the name "district" to "county" throughout the state. The convention also organized Oconee County, from a portion of Pickens District that was west of the Keowee and Seneca rivers, plus a small area around the Fort Hill estate formerly belonging to statesman John C. Calhoun. In the 1960s, this small area around the Calhoun property was transferred to Pickens County.

A new courthouse for Pickens County was erected at its present location. Many of the residents of Old Pickens, on the Keowee River, moved to the newly created town, some relocating their dismantled homes. The loss of the Oconee area greatly reduced the population of Pickens County. It did not again reach 19,000 until 1900.

The county's growth was accelerated by the building of the Atlanta and Charlotte Air Line Railway (later called the Southern Railway) in the 1870s. The town of Easley, named for General W. K. Easley, was chartered in 1874. The towns of Liberty and Central sprang up along the railroad about the same time and were soon incorporated. Calhoun (now part of Clemson) was founded in the 1890s, to be followed in the early 1900s by Six Mile and Norris as incorporated areas.

A major factor in Pickens County's growth was the development of the regional textile industry, which had earlier been based in New England and New York. The county's first modern cotton mill, organized by D. K. Norris and others, was established at Cateechee in 1895. By 1900 the county boasted three cotton mills, two railroads, three banks, three roller mills, 37 sawmills, ten shingle mills, and four brickyards.

Yet until 1940, with a population of 37,000 (13.2 percent black), the county remained primarily rural and agricultural. Like many other Piedmont counties, Pickens had a one-crop economy. Its citizens were engaged mainly in growing cotton or manufacturing it into cloth. A notable change in the Pickens landscape was the coming of paved highways; one completed across the county, about 1930, ran from Greenville to Walhalla by way of Easley, Liberty, and Central.

The most significant developments in the county's history have occurred since World War II. By 1972 there were 99 manufacturing plants in the county, employing almost 15,000 personnel and producing not only textiles but a wide variety of other products. The population today is estimated to be 93,894 residents. According to an article written for Pickens County Heritage, new residents continue to be attracted to Pickens County "because of its climate, industrial opportunity, proximity to Greenville's labor market, and scenic beauty".

== Geography ==
Interactive map of Pickens County

According to the U.S. Census Bureau, the county has a total area of 512.75 square miles (1,328.0 km^{2}), of which 496.94 square miles (1,287.1 km^{2}) is land and 15.81 square miles (40.9 km^{2}) (3.67%) is water. The county also contains the highest natural point in South Carolina, Sassafras Mountain, with an elevation of 3,560 feet (1,090 m). Table Rock State Park is in Pickens County.

Pickens County is in the Savannah River basin, the Saluda River basin, and the French Broad River basin.

=== State and local protected areas/sites ===
- Cateechee Point County Park
- Causey Tract, Gravely Wildlife Management Area, Clemson University
- Eastatoe Creek Heritage Preserve/Wildlife Management Area
- Glassy Mountain Heritage Preserve
- Hagood Mill Historic Site
- Jocassee Gorges Wilderness Area
- Keowee-Toxaway State Park
- Keowee Wildlife Management Area
- Laurel Fork Heritage Preserve/Wildlife Management Area
- Long Shoals Roadside Park
- Meadow Falls
- Nine Times Forest
- Nine Times Preserve
- Pinnacle Mountain
- Poe Creek State Forest (part)
- Table Rock State Park
- Twelve Mile Recreation Area
- Wadakoe Mountain Heritage Preserve/Wildlife Management Area

=== Major water bodies ===
- Lake Hartwell
- Lake Jocassee
- Lake Keowee
- Keowee River
- South Saluda River
- Table Rock Reservoir

=== Adjacent counties ===
- Transylvania County, North Carolina – north
- Greenville County – east
- Anderson County – south
- Oconee County – west

=== Major highways ===
- US 76
- US 123
- US 123 Conn.
- US 178
- SC 8
- SC 8 Conn.
- SC 11
- SC 28
- SC 28 Bus.
- SC 88
- SC 93
- SC 124
- SC 133
- SC 135
- SC 137
- SC 153
- SC 183
- SC 186
- SC 288

=== Major infrastructure ===
- Clemson Station
- Greenville-Pickens Speedway
- Pickens County Airport

== Demographics ==
Historical population
Census	Pop.	Note	%±
1830	14,473		—
1840	14,356		−0.8%
1850	16,904		17.7%
1860	19,639		16.2%
1870	10,269		−47.7%
1880	14,389		40.1%
1890	16,389		13.9%
1900	19,375		18.2%
1910	25,422		31.2%
1920	28,329		11.4%
1930	33,709		19.0%
1940	37,111		10.1%
1950	40,058		7.9%
1960	46,030		14.9%
1970	58,956		28.1%
1980	79,292		34.5%
1990	93,894		18.4%
2000	110,757		18.0%
2010	119,224		7.6%
2020	131,404		10.2%
2025 (est.)	139,198	▲	5.9%
U.S. Decennial Census; 1790–1960 1900–1990; 1990–2000 2010 2020

=== Racial and ethnic composition ===
Pickens County, South Carolina – Racial and ethnic composition Note: the US Census treats Hispanic/Latino as an ethnic category. This table excludes Latinos from the racial categories and assigns them to a separate category. Hispanics/Latinos may be of any race.
Race / Ethnicity (NH = Non-Hispanic)	Pop 1980	Pop 1990	Pop 2000	Pop 2010	Pop 2020	% 1980	% 1990	% 2000	% 2010	% 2020
White alone (NH)	72,562	85,617	98,961	103,958	107,247	91.51%	91.18%	89.35%	87.20%	81.62%
Black or African American alone (NH)	5,825	6,780	7,517	7,792	8,421	7.35%	7.22%	6.79%	6.54%	6.41%
Native American or Alaska Native alone (NH)	77	152	168	210	304	0.10%	0.16%	0.15%	0.18%	0.23%
Asian alone (NH)	261	756	1,301	1,900	2,723	0.33%	0.81%	1.17%	1.59%	2.07%
Native Hawaiian or Pacific Islander alone (NH)	x	x	10	14	37	x	x	0.01%	0.01%	0.03%
Other race alone (NH)	80	18	89	118	426	0.10%	0.02%	0.08%	0.10%	0.32%
Mixed race or Multiracial (NH)	x	x	832	1,489	5,674	x	x	0.75%	1.25%	4.32%
Hispanic or Latino (any race)	487	571	1,879	3,743	6,572	0.61%	0.61%	1.70%	3.14%	5.00%
Total	79,292	93,894	110,757	119,224	131,404	100.00%	100.00%	100.00%	100.00%	100.00%

=== 2020 census ===
As of the 2020 census, there were 131,404 people, 50,364 households, and 31,630 families residing in the county. The median age was 36.0 years, 18.5% of residents were under the age of 18 and 17.3% of residents were 65 years of age or older. For every 100 females there were 96.8 males, and for every 100 females age 18 and over there were 94.9 males age 18 and over.

The racial makeup of the county was 82.7% White, 6.5% Black or African American, 0.3% American Indian and Alaska Native, 2.1% Asian, 0.0% Native Hawaiian and Pacific Islander, 2.5% from some other race, and 5.9% from two or more races. Hispanic or Latino residents of any race comprised 5.0% of the population.

Of the 50,364 households in the county, 26.3% had children under the age of 18 living with them and 27.3% had a female householder with no spouse or partner present. About 27.4% of all households were made up of individuals and 11.4% had someone living alone who was 65 years of age or older. There were 56,385 housing units, of which 10.7% were vacant. Among occupied housing units, 66.9% were owner-occupied and 33.1% were renter-occupied. The homeowner vacancy rate was 1.3% and the rental vacancy rate was 8.5%.

62.4% of residents lived in urban areas, while 37.6% lived in rural areas.

=== 2010 census ===
At the 2010 census, there were 119,224 people, 45,228 households, and 29,540 families residing in the county. The population density was 240.2 inhabitants per square mile (92.7/km^{2}). There were 51,244 housing units at an average density of 103.2 per square mile (39.8/km^{2}). The racial makeup of the county was 88.7% white, 6.6% black or African American, 1.6% Asian, 0.2% American Indian, 1.4% from other races, and 1.5% from two or more races. Those of Hispanic or Latino origin made up 3.1% of the population. In terms of ancestry,

Of the 45,228 households, 30.0% had children under the age of 18 living with them, 50.0% were married couples living together, 10.8% had a female householder with no husband present, 34.7% were non-families, and 25.2% of all households were made up of individuals. The average household size was 2.48 and the average family size was 2.95. The median age was 34.9 years.

The median income for a household in the county was $41,898 and the median income for a family was $53,911. Males had a median income of $41,615 versus $31,464 for females. The per capita income for the county was $20,647. About 8.9% of families and 16.6% of the population were below the poverty line, including 18.3% of those under age 18 and 7.8% of those age 65 or over.

=== 2000 census ===
At the 2000 census, there were 110,757 people, 41,306 households, and 28,459 families residing in the county. The population density was 223 people per square mile (86 people/km^{2}). There were 46,000 housing units at an average density of 93 per square mile (36/km^{2}). The racial makeup of the county was 90.27% White, 6.82% Black or African American, 0.16% Native American, 1.18% Asian, 0.01% Pacific Islander, 0.70% from other races, and 0.85% from two or more races. 1.70% of the population were Hispanic or Latino of any race. 27.9% were of American, 11.8% English, 11.6% Irish, 10.3% German and 5.0% Scotch-Irish ancestry according to Census 2000.

There were 41,306 households, out of which 31.20% had children under the age of 18 living with them, 55.60% were married couples living together, 9.40% had a female householder with no husband present, and 31.10% were non-families. 23.30% of all households were made up of individuals, and 8.20% had someone living alone who was 65 years of age or older. The average household size was 2.50 and the average family size was 2.95.

In the county, the population was spread out, with 22.30% under the age of 18, 17.50% from 18 to 24, 27.60% from 25 to 44, 21.20% from 45 to 64, and 11.40% who were 65 years of age or older. The median age was 33 years. For every 100 females, there were 99.60 males. For every 100 females age 18 and over, there were 98.20 males.

The median income for a household in the county was $36,214, and the median income for a family was $44,507. Males had a median income of $31,795 versus $22,600 for females. The per capita income for the county was $17,434. About 7.80% of families and 13.70% of the population were below the poverty line, including 12.20% of those under age 18 and 11.70% of those age 65 or over.

== Law, government, and public safety ==
=== Police ===
The Pickens County Sheriff's Office is the largest law enforcement agency in the county, and provides its services to all unincorporated areas of the county, incorporated communities without a police department, and may assist a city or town police department upon request by the department. The sheriff's office consists of the command staff, administrative support division, uniform patrol division, detective division, and judicial services division. Within these divisions are the uniform patrol unit, the chaplain unit, special victims unit, sex offender unit, forensics unit, special operations unit, general investigations unit, animal enforcement unit, school resource officers unit, victim services unit, marine patrol unit, aviation unit, K-9 unit, professional standards unit, civil process unit, training unit, records unit, communications unit, detention unit, transport unit, court security unit, community action team, and special weapons and tactics team. The sheriff's office is headquartered at the Pickens County Law Enforcement Center in Pickens. The Pickens County Detention Center is a stand-alone facility located in Pickens that is also managed by the sheriff's office. The sheriff's office has a total of 199 full and part-time personnel. The current sheriff is Tommy Blankenship.

The City of Easley Police Department is the second largest law enforcement agency in the county, and provides its services to persons living within the city limits of Easley. The department consists of an administration division, uniform patrol division, and detective division. There are 42 police officers and 3 civilians working for the department. The department is headquartered at the Easley Law Enforcement Center in downtown Easley. The current chief of police is Brandon Liner.

The City of Pickens Police Department provides its services to persons living within the city limits of Pickens. The department is headquartered at the Pickens Police Station next to the Pickens Fire Station. The current chief of police is Randall Beach.

The City of Clemson Police Department provides its services to persons living within the city limits of Clemson. The department is headquartered at the Clemson Law Enforcement Center. The current chief of police is Jorge Campos

The City of Liberty Police Department provides its services to persons living within the city limits of Liberty. The department is headquartered at Liberty Town Hall in downtown Liberty. The current chief of police is Victor Tetter.

The Town of Central Police Department provides its services to persons living within the town limits of Central. The department consists of the chief of police, an investigative sergeant, training sergeant, five officers, and a victims advocate/administrative assistant. The department's headquarters are located in downtown Central. The current chief of police is Steve Thompson.

The Clemson University Police Department provides its services to the Clemson University campus. The interim police chief is Christopher Harrington.

The South Carolina Highway Patrol provides its services on all roads, highways, and interstate highways in the county. There is one SCHP barracks in Pickens County, Post B, serving both Oconee and Pickens counties. Post B falls under SCHP Troop 3. (Oconee/Pickens/Anderson/Greenville/Spartanburg counties)

=== Fire safety ===
There is no countywide fire department, but several communities in the county do maintain their own fire departments.

- Central Fire Department
- Central Rural Fire Department
- Clemson University Fire Department
- Crosswell Fire Department
- Dacusville Rural Fire Department
- Easley Fire Department
- Liberty Fire Department
- Norris Fire Department
- Pickens Fire Department
- Six Mile Fire Department

=== Politics ===
Pickens County was one of the first areas of South Carolina to turn Republican. It has gone Republican all but twice since 1952, and at all times since 1980. Jimmy Carter's narrow loss in 1980 is the last time that a Democrat has won even 40 percent of the county's vote. Despite this, Democrats held most state and local offices well into the 1990s.

Since 2000, it has been the most Republican county in the state, with the GOP taking 70+ percent of the vote each time. In 2008, it was the only county in the state to give John McCain over 70% of the vote.

United States presidential election results for Pickens County, South Carolina
Year	Republican		Democratic		Third party(ies)	
Year	No.	%	No.	%	No.	%
1892	129	10.79%	603	50.42%	464	38.80%
1896	170	11.88%	1,261	88.12%	0	0.00%
1900	60	6.04%	933	93.96%	0	0.00%
1904	6	0.65%	914	99.35%	0	0.00%
1908	56	4.32%	1,241	95.68%	0	0.00%
1912	15	1.77%	815	96.11%	18	2.12%
1916	7	0.58%	1,139	95.08%	52	4.34%
1920	63	6.19%	955	93.81%	0	0.00%
1924	35	3.23%	1,044	96.49%	3	0.28%
1928	192	14.75%	1,110	85.25%	0	0.00%
1932	57	2.08%	2,685	97.92%	0	0.00%
1936	50	1.83%	2,678	98.17%	0	0.00%
1940	76	3.46%	2,122	96.54%	0	0.00%
1944	211	8.55%	1,662	67.34%	595	24.11%
1948	165	8.49%	435	22.38%	1,344	69.14%
1952	3,096	51.94%	2,865	48.06%	0	0.00%
1956	1,747	40.84%	1,847	43.17%	684	15.99%
1960	4,201	62.26%	2,546	37.74%	0	0.00%
1964	5,882	62.63%	3,506	37.33%	3	0.03%
1968	6,873	51.63%	2,016	15.14%	4,424	33.23%
1972	11,776	82.37%	2,255	15.77%	265	1.85%
1976	8,029	48.21%	8,505	51.07%	121	0.73%
1980	9,575	53.42%	7,789	43.46%	559	3.12%
1984	15,155	76.68%	4,481	22.67%	128	0.65%
1988	17,448	73.63%	6,103	25.76%	145	0.61%
1992	17,008	57.67%	8,275	28.06%	4,211	14.28%
1996	17,151	61.47%	8,369	30.00%	2,380	8.53%
2000	24,681	71.37%	8,927	25.81%	974	2.82%
2004	29,759	73.46%	10,287	25.39%	464	1.15%
2008	32,552	72.13%	11,691	25.91%	885	1.96%
2012	33,474	73.49%	11,156	24.49%	919	2.02%
2016	36,236	73.88%	10,354	21.11%	2,459	5.01%
2020	42,907	74.56%	13,645	23.71%	994	1.73%
2024	45,728	75.64%	13,891	22.98%	832	1.38%

== Economy ==
In 2022, the GDP was $5 billion (about $37,089 per capita), and the real GDP was $4.2 billion (about $30,795 per capita) in chained 2017 dollars.

As of April 2024, some of the largest employers in the county include Aramark, the city of Clemson, Clemson University, Danfoss, Ingles, Lowe's, Merck & Co., Prisma Health, Publix, St. Jude Medical, and Walmart.

Employment and Wage Statistics by Industry in Pickens County, South Carolina - Q3 2023
Industry	Employment Counts	Employment Percentage (%)	Average Annual Wage ($)
Accommodation and Food Services	5,848	15.2	19,292
Administrative and Support and Waste Management and Remediation Services	971	2.5	39,572
Agriculture, Forestry, Fishing and Hunting	71	0.2	35,100
Arts, Entertainment, and Recreation	1,186	3.1	21,788
Construction	1,377	3.6	51,740
Educational Services	8,192	21.4	73,424
Finance and Insurance	575	1.5	67,340
Health Care and Social Assistance	3,679	9.6	56,056
Information	179	0.5	124,228
Management of Companies and Enterprises	53	0.1	81,484
Manufacturing	5,183	13.5	67,704
Other Services (except Public Administration)	916	2.4	36,452
Professional, Scientific, and Technical Services	1,025	2.7	75,764
Public Administration	1,771	4.6	44,772
Real Estate and Rental and Leasing	356	0.9	41,184
Retail Trade	5,769	15.0	32,136
Transportation and Warehousing	315	0.8	63,024
Utilities	401	1.0	84,656
Wholesale Trade	499	1.3	66,352
Total	38,366	100.0%	50,879

== Education ==
=== School districts ===
Pickens County School District is the sole school district of the county.

In 2010 the district was ranked the highest in the state with an "A−" transparency score from Sunshine Review.

=== Schools ===
- Ambler Elementary – Pickens
- Central Elementary – Central
- Chastain Road Elementary – Liberty
- Clemson Elementary – Clemson
- Crosswell Elementary – Easley
- Dacusville Elementary – Dacusville
- East End Elementary – Easley
- Forest Acres Elementary – Easley
- Hagood Elementary – Pickens
- Liberty Elementary – Liberty
- McKissick Elementary – Easley
- Pickens Elementary – Pickens
- Six Mile Elementary – Six Mile
- West End Elementary – Easley
- Dacusville Middle – Dacusville
- Liberty Middle – Liberty
- Pickens Middle – Pickens
- R.C. Edwards Middle – Central
- R.H. Gettys Middle – Easley
- D.W. Daniel High – Central
- Easley High School – Easley
- Liberty High – Liberty
- Pickens High School – Pickens

=== Colleges and universities ===
- Clemson University
- Southern Wesleyan University

=== Public library ===
Pickens County is served by the Pickens County Library System, headquartered in Easley, with four branch libraries in the county.

== Communities ==
=== Cities ===
- Clemson (partly in Anderson County)
- Easley (largest community; partly in Anderson County)
- Liberty
- Pickens (county seat)

=== Towns ===
- Central
- Norris
- Six Mile

=== Census-designated places ===
- Arial
- Cateechee
- Clemson University
- Dacusville

=== Unincorporated communities ===
- Nine Times
- Pumpkintown
- Rocky Bottom
- Sunset

== Notable people ==
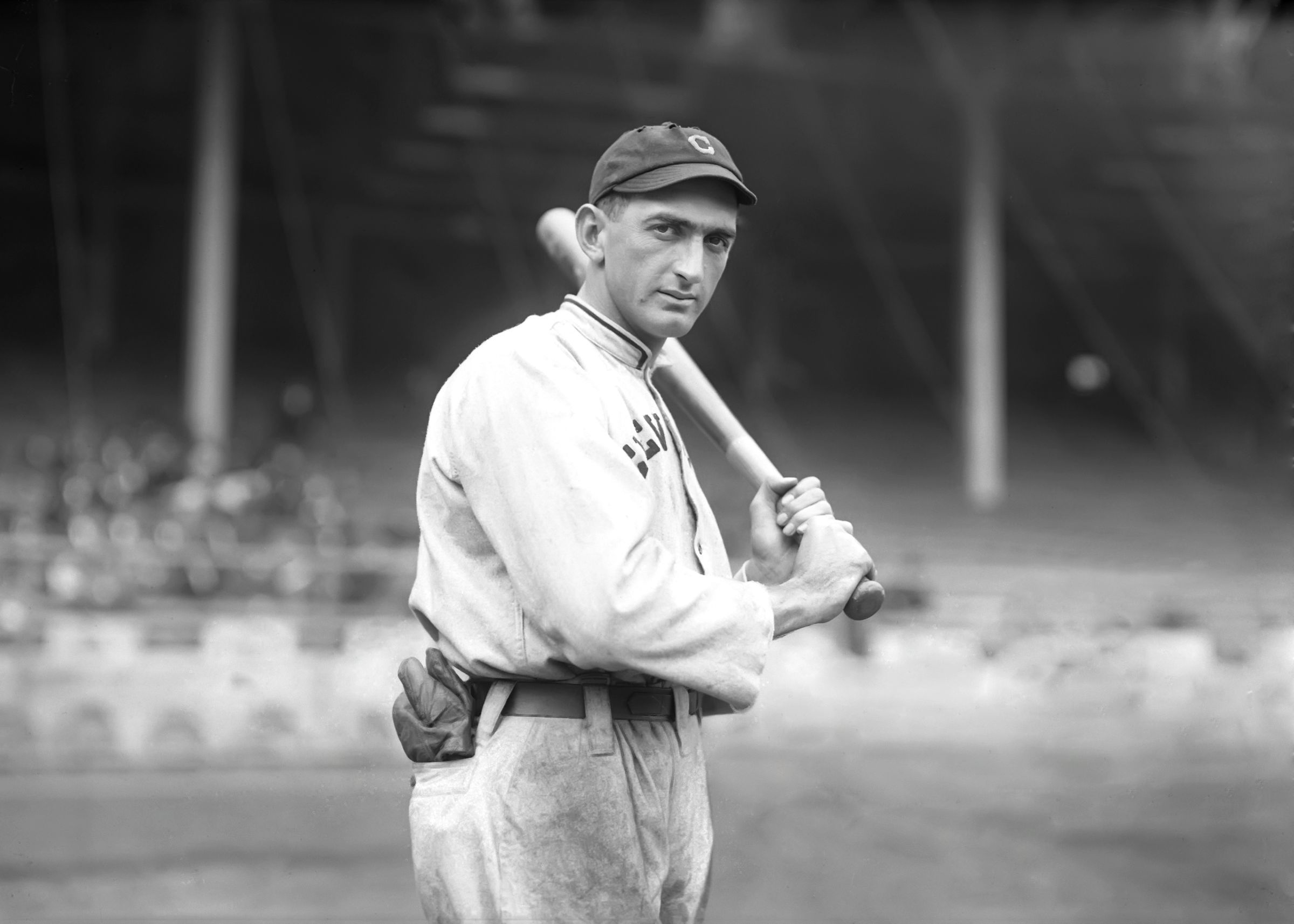
Shoeless Joe Jackson

- Bobby Baker, scandal-plagued Secretary to the Majority Leader of the Senate until 1963
- Charles H. Barker, awarded a Medal of Honor for his actions in the Korean War
- Benjy Bronk, in-studio joke writer and on-air persona for the Howard Stern Show
- John C. Calhoun, influential politician of the first half of the nineteenth century
- DeAndre Hopkins, wide receiver for the Arizona Cardinals of the NFL
- Shoeless Joe Jackson, baseball player, born July 16, 1888; closely associated with the Black Sox Scandal in 1919
- Stanley Morgan, former NFL wide receiver who played for the New England Patriots; was born in Easley on February 17, 1955; member of the New England Patriots Hall of Fame
- Ray Robinson Williams, blind lawyer and state senator
- Sam Wyche, former NFL football player and coach, resident

== See also ==
- List of counties in South Carolina
- National Register of Historic Places listings in Pickens County, South Carolina
