= Nine Times, South Carolina =

Nine Times
- Unincorporated community
- Location within the state of South Carolina
- Coordinates: 34°54′54″N 82°50′39″W
- Country: United States
- State: South Carolina
- County: Pickens
- Elevation: 988 ft (301 m)
- Time zone: UTC-5 (Eastern (EST))
  - Summer (DST): UTC-4 (EDT)
- GNIS feature ID: 1225053

Nine Times is an unincorporated community in Pickens County.

The community was so named on account of the nine water crossings of a path over a nearby creek.
