= Keowee-Toxaway State Park =

State park in Pickens County, South Carolina

- Interactive map of Keowee-Toxaway State Park
- Nearest city: Six Mile, South Carolina
- Coordinates: 34°55′48″N 82°52′59″W
- Area: 1,000 acres (405 ha)
- Created: 1970
- Hiking trails: 3

Keowee-Toxaway State Park is a state park in Pickens County, South Carolina. It was created in 1970 along the shores of Lake Keowee from lands previously owned by Duke Power.

The Keowee-Toxaway Museum includes exhibits about the area Cherokee Indians and their interactions with local settlers. There are four interpretive kiosks along one trail that also highlight the Cherokees. Trail has since been closed and artifacts moved to the Cherokee museum in Walhalla, South Carolina.

The park includes several picnic shelters as well as fishing and boat access to the adjacent lake. Hiking can be done on the 3.1 mi (5.0 km) Raven Rock hiking trail or the 1.4 mi (2.3 km) Natural Bridge hiking trail, as well as a short interpretive loop trail. The park also offers both backcountry and paved campsites, as well as cabin lodging.
