= Arp, Georgia =

Unincorporated community in Georgia, U.S.

Coordinates: 34°18′25″N 83°24′42″W

Arp is an unincorporated community in Banks County, in the U.S. state of Georgia. The community lies about 5 miles (8.0 km) northeast of the county seat at Homer.

== History ==
A post office called Arp was established in 1880, and remained in operation until 1905. The community was named for humorist Bill Arp. In 1900, the community had 100 inhabitants.
