= Ray Williams (educator) =

Ray Williams currently serves as the Director of Education and Academic Affairs the Blanton Museum of Art, located at the University of Texas at Austin. Previously, Williams was appointed the first ever Director of Education at the Harvard Art Museums.

== Early life and education ==
Ray Williams was born in North Carolina, in the mountains of Appalachia. He attended a K-12 school that provided early exposure to museums and art education through class field trips and studio courses, and enjoyed the perks of growing up in a university town. He attended Western Carolina University in 1982 where, after several major changes, he earned his Bachelor of Arts in English with a minor in Art History. With his interest in Art History piqued, Williams continued on to earn a Master's degree in Art History from University of North Carolina at Chapel Hill in 1987. His time at Chapel Hill solidified his personal interest in interdisciplinary work, and rather than pursue his PhD in Art History, made the decision to participate in a volunteer docent program at the Ackland Art Museum. This served as the beginning of Williams' work in formal art education served as a catalyst for a successful career.

== Career & Notable Projects ==
Ray Williams is the current Director of Education and Academic Affairs at the Blanton Museum of Art (20012-current). He previously held the position of director of education at the Harvard Art Museums, Rhode Island School of Design's Museum of Art, Peabody Essex Museum, the Freer Gallery of Art and Arthur M. Sackler Gallery, and the Ackland Art Museum.

While at the Harvard and Sackler Museums, Williams stewarded a project initiative that brought English language learners and those applying for their United States Citizenship test into the museum. The project, titled "Engaging New Americans: Explorations in Art, Self, and Our Democratic Heritage" was funded by the National Endowment for the Arts and served to connect American art with an immigrant's experience, through gallery sessions, discussions and activities. Also at the Harvard and Sackler Museums, Williams developed programming that brought physicians and medical educators in to the museum spaces for lessons in close looking, and empathy and communication skills; this work further carried over to the University of Texas at Austin's Dell Medical School.

Ray Williams' current projects focus on Social and Emotional Learning (SEL) curriculum and resources for the Blanton Art Museum, while creating virtual content for learners during COVID-19. These efforts also seek to support English Language Learners.

== Publications ==
- Williams, R. (2019). Welcoming (and Learning From) the Stranger: The Museum as a Forum for Interfaith Dialogue. Journal of Museum Education, 44(1), 34–40.
- "Art and Slavery," chapter in Understanding and Teaching American Slavery, University of Wisconsin Press, 2016
- "The Power of Art in Training Better Doctors," op-ed column for Dallas Morning News, January 2014
- Engaging New Americans: Preparing for US Citizenship with the Harvard Art Museums, Sourcebook with lesson plans co-authored with Judy Murray, 2012
- "Art Museums as Places of Learning and Reflection for the Medical Field," Journal of Museum Education, spring 2011
- "Honoring the Personal Response: A Strategy for Serving the Public Hunger for Connection," Journal of Museum Education, 2010

== Awards ==
As per Ray William's CV:

- Fulbright-Hayes Travel Grant (2003)
- First prize, Educational Resources, AAM design competition (2000)
- Korea Society Fall Fellowship, October (2000)
- Getty Guest Scholar (2000)
- National Art Education Association's "National Museum Educator of 1997 (1997)
- Southeastern Regional Art Museum Educator of 1991 (1991)
- Second prize, Educational Resources, AAM design competition (1993)
