= Ray Williams (footballer, born 1931) =

Welsh footballer

Personal information
- Full name: Raymond Williams
- Date of birth: 1 May 1931
- Place of birth: Wrexham, Wales
- Date of death: 2015 (aged 83–84)
- Place of death: Wrexham, Wales
- Position: Right-back

Senior career*
Years	Team	Apps	(Gls)
- Holyhead Town
1951–1951	Wrexham	12	(0)
- Rhos Rangers
- * Club domestic league appearances and goals

Raymond Williams (1 May 1931 – September 2015) was a Welsh professional footballer who played as a right-back. He made appearances in the English Football League with Wrexham.
