= Ray Robinson Williams =

American politician

Ray Robinson Williams (March 5, 1899 - October 22, 1987) was a blind lawyer in Greenville, South Carolina and a South Carolina state senator, 1940–1953.

Williams was born, the seventh of seven children, on his father's Pickens County farm and became totally blind as the result of two childhood accidents.

Williams attended the South Carolina State School for the Deaf and Blind at Cedar Springs in Spartanburg County, graduated with honors, and was awarded a scholarship to attend the University of South Carolina. He became so proficient in navigating the USC campus that he guided other students at night. In 1923, Williams graduated magna cum laude and was valedictorian of his class. Before graduation Williams had already enrolled in the law school and so was able to graduate with both Bachelor of Law and Master of Arts degrees the following year. Williams had "a tremendous ability to concentrate. He once remarked that he knew that he would only get one shot at the material."

In Greenville, Williams prospered in his legal practice and entered a partnership with classmate James A. Henry that continued until 1983. In 1929 Williams married Genevieve Castleman Groom, and they had three children. The family moved to the fashionable Earle Street district and the family became members of Earle Street Baptist Church. Williams also bought a farm on Roper Mountain Road outside Greenville.

In 1936 Williams ran successfully for the South Carolina General Assembly and was reelected in 1938. In 1940 he was elected to the State Senate where he served until 1953. There he wrote a bill that created the State Agricultural Marketing Commission, inaugurating state support for farmers' markets; and he supported rural electrification, improvement of county roads, modernizing county record-keeping systems, and school equalization. In a contemporary newspaper article, James H. McKinney, Jr. wrote, "He sat quietly most of the time, rarely rising to speak, and when he did speak, he spoke quietly. But when he spoke the whole Senate grew quiet to listen to his soft voice."
