= Townville, South Carolina =

Townville
- Unincorporated community
- Location within South Carolina Location within the United States
- Coordinates: 34°33′49″N 82°53′55″W
- Country: United States
- State: South Carolina
- County: Anderson
- Elevation: 817 ft (249 m)

Population (2014)
  - Total: 3,913
- Time zone: UTC-5 (Eastern (EST))
  - Summer (DST): UTC-4 (EDT)
- ZIP Code: 29689
- Area codes: 864, 821
- GNIS feature ID: 1251191

Townville is an unincorporated community in Anderson County, South Carolina. Townville is located on South Carolina Highway 24, 14.8 miles (23.8 km) west-northwest of Anderson. Townville has a post office with ZIP Code 29689, which opened on December 13, 1836.

== See also ==
- 2016 Townville Elementary School shooting
