= Liberty, South Carolina =

City in South Carolina, United States

- City
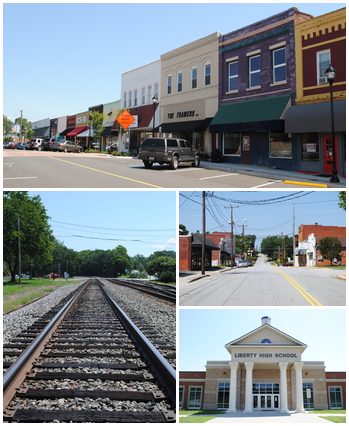
- Top, left to right: Downtown Liberty, railroad tracks, West Front Street, Liberty High School

- Flag Seal

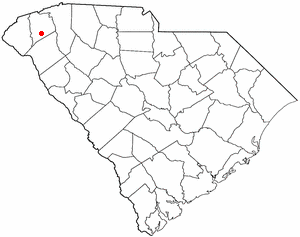
- Location of Liberty, South Carolina
- Coordinates: 34°47′24″N 82°41′46″W
- Country: United States
- State: South Carolina
- County: Pickens

Government
  - Type: Mayor–council government
  - Body: Liberty City Council
  - Mayor: Andrea Wagner
  - City Council: List: Mikail Cantley; Gerald Wilson; William 'Bo' Cooley; Jeff Massie; Jon Humphrey; Rhonda Whitaker

Area
  - Total: 4.54 sq mi (11.76 km^{2})
  - Land: 4.53 sq mi (11.73 km^{2})
  - Water: 0.012 sq mi (0.03 km^{2})
- Elevation: 984 ft (300 m)

Population (2020)
  - Total: 3,366
  - Density: 743.5/sq mi (287.08/km^{2})
- Time zone: UTC−5 (Eastern (EST))
  - Summer (DST): UTC−4 (EDT)
- ZIP code: 29657
- Area codes: 864, 821
- FIPS code: 45-41380
- GNIS feature ID: 2404925
- Website: www.libertysc.com

Liberty is a city in Pickens County, South Carolina, United States. As of the 2020 census, Liberty had a population of 3,366. It is part of the Greenville-Mauldin-Easley metropolitan area. The city was chartered on March 2, 1876.

== Toponymy ==
How exactly Liberty got its name has been a source of debate over the years. There are no real historical accounts of why Liberty was given the name it was. The most popular—though probably mythical—story regarding the reason the area was named Liberty was put forth by Mrs. Annie Craig in 1936:

At the close of the Revolutionary War a religious meeting was being held at a church close to a spring near the present town of Liberty when the word came that Cornwallis had surrendered and the colonies had gained their independence. This church was named Liberty and it and the spring were located just beyond where the cemetery is now located, hence the name Liberty.

Some have claimed that Liberty was once named Salubrity Springs, but was renamed Liberty in the late 19th century. References to early land records, however, suggest that such is not the case. While there are many records that refer to the area as Liberty Spring, there are no private or legal documents that contain a reference to Salubrity Spring. The first reference to Salubrity comes from the name of a farm purchased by the Rev. Allen Fuller, Universalist, in 1837. In 1839, Mr. Fuller set up a post office in his home, naming it the Salubrity Post Office. This post office remained in operation until February, 1876, three years after the first official Liberty post office was established in 1873. Once the town of Liberty was chartered a little more than a month after the Salubrity post office closed, the name Salubrity became little more than a memory.

== History ==
=== Early history (to 1890) ===
Liberty today sits on land that was once part of the Cherokee Indians' hunting ground. The Otarre, or Lower Hill Cherokees, had several thriving villages along the riverbanks in the area; perhaps the most notable example being the village of Keowee, located near the modern day Oconee and Pickens County line. Cherokee tribesmen, who often survived by growing crops, and tended to live in small villages, were in many ways more domesticated than other Native American tribes. The Cherokee also hunted game, believing that the foothills were a sacred hunting ground for deer, buffalo, and other large animals.

Tradition holds that Hernando DeSoto and his group of Spanish explorers were the first Europeans to travel through the area around year 1540. The first Englishmen to venture into the area were traders who often travelled up from Charles Town and Savannah to exchange their guns, horses, cloth, and liquor with the Cherokee for animal skin and fur. In 1753, British colonists built Fort Prince George, the first white settlement in Pickens County. During the American Revolution the Cherokee chose to support the loyalists. South Carolinian patriots, angered at the Cherokee for supporting the Redcoats, forced them to cede much of their territory with the Treaty of DeWitt's Corner in 1777. American settlers did not start moving into the area in large numbers until the mid-1780s.

Much of the history of the Liberty area in the late 18th century is unknown. By 1800, Liberty—then called Liberty Spring—was included in the newly formed Pendleton District, which included most of modern-day Anderson, Oconee, and Pickens Counties. During the Antebellum period, most people living in Liberty Spring were subsistence farmers: farmers who grew only what they needed to survive. Few in the area could afford to own slaves like the wealthier planters in the Lowcountry, and almost every farmer was forced to work the land himself. Even for those who wished to trade with other towns, the poor roads made the effort to transport goods cost more than those goods were often worth. Outside of church, residents had few opportunities to socialize with each other. By 1826, the Pendleton District had split up into Pickens and Anderson Districts, with Liberty becoming part of the new Pickens District, which included both Pickens and Oconee Counties.

=== Civil War and Reconstruction era (1860–1877) ===
In 1860, a group of Pickens County delegates went to Columbia, where they—along with every other South Carolina delegate—voted unanimously in favor of South Carolina's secession from the Union. Though it is generally accepted that the first shot of the Civil War occurred when the Union ship Star of the West was fired upon by state troops at Morris Island on January 9, 1861, an old legend claims that a resident named William Mauldin fired upon the Union ship from Fort Moultrie a few hours earlier, making him the first shot of the War. Either way, what is known is that men from almost every family in the area enlisted to fight for the Confederate cause. Many families lost two, three, or more sons to the war effort. Several companies of infantry and cavalry were formed in Pickens District before being dispatched to serve under one of the state regiments. The men who either refused to enlist or deserted in battle were often thought upon with scorn by their neighbors for the rest of their lives, and even their descendants were often ostracized for years afterward. The women who stayed behind willingly suffered through the whole war by doing without food and supplies that were needed in the war effort.

After the war, Pickens District, like the rest of the South, was placed under martial law by Union troops. With little choice in the matter, South Carolina was readmitted to the Union in 1868. Not long afterwards, Pickens District was separated into the modern day Pickens and Oconee Counties. Between 1865 and 1877, southerners had little control over their government. Gangs of Union troops sacked and looted many farms in Pickens County during this period, known as Reconstruction, and the county and state governments were largely controlled by Northerners who moved South after the war. Reconstruction officially ended in South Carolina around the year 1877, not long after former Confederate General Wade Hampton III was elected governor under the Democratic ticket.

=== Founders' era (1876–1900) ===
Liberty's official recognition as a town came soon after the Charlotte-Atlanta Airline Railway was completed in the early 1870s. Former Confederate General William Easley, a lawyer working for the railroad company, negotiated to have the tracks laid through the southern part of Pickens County. It is along these tracks that the towns of Liberty, Easley, and Central all grew. By 1873, Liberty Station was built north of Liberty Spring after Mrs. Catherine Templeton deeded her land to the railroad company. John T. Boggs set up the new Liberty Post Office that same year, and was named the town's first postmaster. Liberty was formally chartered on March 2, 1876, with the future town center being located on the former lands of Mrs. Templeton.

In 1877, James Avenger was appointed the town's first marshall. The marshall, a forerunner to today's chief of police, was satirized in a Pickens Sentinel article that claimed, "there was nothing for him to do, except to look after the cows that go astray." The town's first mayor W.E. Holcombe, a lawyer and former state senator, was elected in 1876. He, like every succeeding mayor until the early 20th century, conducted most municipal business in his own home. Several schools were already in operation by this time, with most being privately funded, and sponsored either by the community or by the local churches. The Liberty First Baptist Church had existed prior to the city's founding, being located at the old Liberty Spring site. Reports indicate the Church had a congregation as early as year 1802, when they met at an old log house north of the present-day town. The Liberty Presbyterian Church was built in 1883 at its present site; formerly the church's members had worshiped at Mt. Carmel Church in the country.

=== Textile era (1900–1980) ===
Liberty's next change came in 1901, when Mr. Jeptha P. Smith organized and started the first cotton mill, which he named the Liberty Mill. The original mill contained a card room and an operating spinning frame. Eighteen houses and two overseer houses were built as a mill village to house the plant's workers and their families. The second cotton mill was built by Mr. Lang Clayton of Norris in 1905. Built in a part of town often referred to as Rabbit Town, the plant was originally named the Calumet Mill, and later renamed the Maplecroft Mill. By 1920, both mills had come under the control of Woodside Mills. The first mill became known as Woodside Liberty Plant #1 (commonly called the Big Mill), and the second as Woodside Liberty Plant #2 (commonly called the Little Mill). Woodside Mills operated the plants until 1956, when the company was purchased by Dan River Mills of Virginia. At their height in the 1970s, the mills employed over one thousand workers and housed over one thousand looms. In the 1970s, the Woodside Liberty Mills were the world's largest producers of Oxford fabric, a popular fabric of the era. The mills were again purchased in the early 1980s by Greenwood Mills, which maintained control of the mills until local textile industry declined in the 1990s due largely to foreign competition. In 2013 the little mill was demolished. The Big Mill is currently being stripped for demolition.

The growth of cotton mills in the area brought about a major shift in the way people lived. Many migrated away from farmlands to the mill villages, and went from growing food to survive to earning hourly wages in the mills. Though farming was a hard life, early mill life was grueling in its own right; mill workers—condescendingly referred to as lintheads—often worked twelve or more hours a day in unventilated rooms. Nevertheless, most workers believed that they were fortunate just to have such work, and willingly worked in the same mills all their lives. In many mill village families, both the husband and wife worked in the same mill.

Outside of the mills, several other major changes also happened during this long time period. Electricity came to Liberty in 1910, when Mr. J. Warren Smith, a salesman, installed two gasoline generators downtown to operate the first street lights and the lights of several shops. By 1928, demand had increased to the point that Mr. Smith decided to sell his assets to Duke Power, which established a small office downtown. The Liberty Fire Department was first established in 1925, with J. Warren Smith—the same man who brought electricity to Liberty—being named as the first fire chief. The Fire Department moved into its present building in 1974. The first town library originated in 1947 as a small room located in the same building as City Hall. The Sarlin Community Library, the one in current use, was built at its present location in 1966. Liberty's police department was finally organized in the 1920s, when the city employed a chief of police and two policemen. The first telephone service came to Liberty in 1902, when Southern Bell installed a telephone switchboard in the same building as the post office. The first water plant for the town was built in 1918 on Black Snake Road. This plant initially supplied water to around one hundred homes. This plant was phased out by 1956 after a newer waterworks site was built on Eighteen Mile Creek.

The former Mohawk Carpet plant is currently occupied by Southern Vinyl Windows & Doors, a major employer in the area.

== Geography ==
According to the United States Census Bureau, the town had a total area of 4.3 square miles (11 km^{2}), all of it land.

== Demographics ==
Historical population
Census	Pop.	Note	%±
1880	149		—
1890	211		41.6%
1900	368		74.4%
1910	1,058		187.5%
1920	1,705		61.2%
1930	2,128		24.8%
1940	2,240		5.3%
1950	2,291		2.3%
1960	2,657		16.0%
1970	2,860		7.6%
1980	3,167		10.7%
1990	3,228		1.9%
2000	3,009		−6.8%
2010	3,269		8.6%
2020	3,366		3.0%
U.S. Decennial Census

=== 2020 census ===
As of the 2020 census, there were 3,366 people, 1,392 households, and 929 families residing in the city. The median age was 40.9 years, 21.8% of residents were under the age of 18, and 19.7% of residents were 65 years of age or older. For every 100 females there were 92.3 males, and for every 100 females age 18 and over there were 87.5 males.

Of those households, 30.3% had children under the age of 18 living in them. Of all households, 44.8% were married-couple households, 16.7% were households with a male householder and no spouse or partner present, and 32.6% were households with a female householder and no spouse or partner present. About 30.4% of all households were made up of individuals and 15.1% had someone living alone who was 65 years of age or older.

As of the 2020 census, there were 1,544 housing units, of which 9.8% were vacant. The homeowner vacancy rate was 1.8% and the rental vacancy rate was 7.9%.

As of the 2020 census, 91.9% of residents lived in urban areas, while 8.1% lived in rural areas.

Racial composition as of the 2020 census
Race	Number	Percent
White	2,835	84.2%
Black or African American	217	6.4%
American Indian and Alaska Native	30	0.9%
Asian	16	0.5%
Native Hawaiian and Other Pacific Islander	0	0.0%
Some other race	79	2.3%
Two or more races	189	5.6%
Hispanic or Latino (of any race)	146	4.3%

=== 2000 census ===
As of the census of 2000, there were 3,009 people, 1,267 households, and 881 families residing in the town. The population density was 705.0 inhabitants per square mile (272.2/km^{2}). There were 1,404 housing units at an average density of 329.0 per square mile (127.0/km^{2}). The racial makeup of the town was 86.94% White, 11.53% African American, 0.10% Native American, 0.07% Asian, 0.63% from other races, and 0.73% from two or more races. Hispanic or Latino of any race were 1.00% of the population.

There were 1,267 households, out of which 26.8% had children under the age of 18 living with them, 51.9% were married couples living together, 13.7% had a female householder with no husband present, and 30.4% were non-families. 27.0% of all households were made up of individuals, and 12.5% had someone living alone who was 65 years of age or older. The average household size was 2.37 and the average family size was 2.86.

In the town the population was spread out, with 23.0% under the age of 18, 7.9% from 18 to 24, 27.6% from 25 to 44, 23.5% from 45 to 64, and 18.0% who were 65 years of age or older. The median age was 39 years. For every 100 females, there were 90.2 males. For every 100 females age 18 and over, there were 85.8 males.

The median income for a household in the town was $31,055, and the median income for a family was $37,656. Males had a median income of $30,753 versus $21,051 for females. The per capita income for the town was $15,327. About 11.1% of families and 13.3% of the population were below the poverty line, including 18.0% of those under age 18 and 15.4% of those age 65 or over.

== Arts and culture ==
Liberty Idol, was a karaoke style singing competition based on the popular American Idol television series, began in 2006 and lasted 6 seasons. Crowds at Liberty Idol peaked at 3500.

== In the media ==
The film The Midnight Man starring Cameron Mitchell was filmed in the Liberty, Six Mile, and Clemson areas in the 1970s.

A majority of the 1999 major motion picture Chill Factor, starring Cuba Gooding Jr. and Skeet Ulrich, was filmed on location in Liberty and its surrounding areas.

== Education ==
Liberty is a part of the School District of Pickens County. It includes a primary school (grades PK-2), an elementary school (Grades 3-5), one middle school (Grades 6-8), and one high school (Grades 9-12). There are 842 students enrolled in Liberty Elementary School, 731 students enrolled at Liberty Middle School, and 690 students enrolled at Liberty High School. 2 new schools were recently built in 2011. The current mascots are the Red Devils for Liberty High School, the Liberty Lab for Liberty Elementary School, Falcons for Liberty Middle School, and Wolfpack for Liberty Primary School.

Liberty has a public library, the Sarlin Community Library, a branch of the Pickens County Library System.

== Government ==
The City of Liberty operates under a Mayor–Council form of municipal government. The mayor acts as an executive and oversees the day-to-day operation of the city. The council acts as a legislator and enact ordinances, levy taxes, adopt a budget and set compensation. The mayor is elected at-large. There are six council members; two are elected at-large and four are elected based on wards.

The mayor is Andrea Wagner.
