= Norris, South Carolina =

- Town
- Location within the state of South Carolina
- Coordinates: 34°45′28″N 82°44′57″W
- Country: United States
- State: South Carolina
- County: Pickens

Area
  - Total: 1.88 sq mi (4.88 km^{2})
  - Land: 1.88 sq mi (4.88 km^{2})
  - Water: 0 sq mi (0.00 km^{2})
- Elevation: 971 ft (296 m)

Population (2020)
  - Total: 741
  - Density: 393.4/sq mi (151.88/km^{2})
- Time zone: UTC-5 (Eastern (EST))
  - Summer (DST): UTC-4 (EDT)
- ZIP code: 29667
- Area codes: 864, 821
- FIPS code: 45-50515
- GNIS feature ID: 2407001
- Website: www.townofnorris.org

Norris is a town in Pickens County, South Carolina, United States. As of the 2020 census, Norris had a population of 741. It is part of the Greenville–Mauldin–Easley Metropolitan Statistical Area.

== Geography ==
According to the United States Census Bureau, the town has a total area of 1.9 square miles (4.9 km^{2}), all of it land.

== Government ==
The current mayor of Norris is Odell Williams.

== Demographics ==
Historical population
Census	Pop.	Note	%±
1910	180		—
1920	206		14.4%
1930	216		4.9%
1940	177		−18.1%
1950	325		83.6%
1960	594		82.8%
1970	757		27.4%
1980	903		19.3%
1990	884		−2.1%
2000	847		−4.2%
2010	813		−4.0%
2020	741		−8.9%
U.S. Decennial Census

As of the census of 2000, there were 847 people, 346 households, and 252 families residing in the town. The population density was 447.9 inhabitants per square mile (172.9/km^{2}). There were 400 housing units at an average density of 211.5 per square mile (81.7/km^{2}). The racial makeup of the town was 88.08% White, 9.68% African American, 0.47% Native American, 0.71% Asian, 0.59% from other races, and 0.47% from two or more races. Hispanic or Latino of any race were 0.24% of the population.

There were 346 households, out of which 30.1% had children under the age of 18 living with them, 54.6% were married couples living together, 13.3% had a female householder with no husband present, and 26.9% were non-families. 23.4% of all households were made up of individuals, and 8.4% had someone living alone who was 65 years of age or older. The average household size was 2.45 and the average family size was 2.88.

In the town, the population was spread out, with 23.8% under the age of 18, 6.6% from 18 to 24, 31.5% from 25 to 44, 24.3% from 45 to 64, and 13.7% who were 65 years of age or older. The median age was 38 years. For every 100 females, there were 99.3 males. For every 100 females age 18 and over, there were 95.5 males.

The median income for a household in the town was $33,393, and the median income for a family was $37,024. Males had a median income of $27,404 versus $21,563 for females. The per capita income for the town was $13,825. About 7.8% of families and 11.1% of the population were below the poverty line, including 11.2% of those under age 18 and 14.0% of those age 65 or over.
