= Six Mile, South Carolina =

- Town
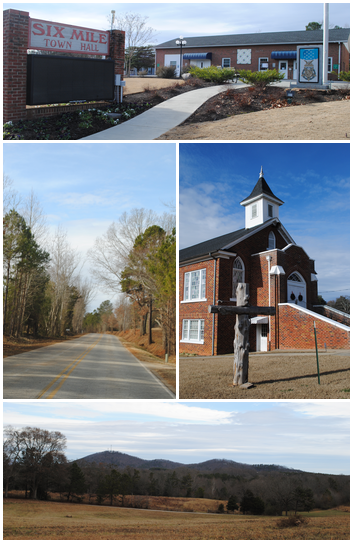
- Top, left to right: Six Mile Town Hall, Liberty Highway, Six Mile Baptist Church, view of nearby mountain from Main Street

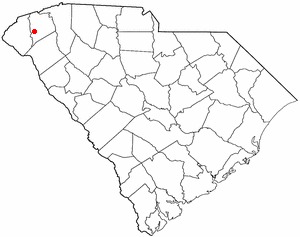
- Location of Six Mile, South Carolina
- Coordinates: 34°48′30″N 82°48′55″W
- Country: United States
- State: South Carolina
- County: Pickens

Area
  - Total: 2.05 sq mi (5.31 km^{2})
  - Land: 2.04 sq mi (5.28 km^{2})
  - Water: 0.012 sq mi (0.03 km^{2})
- Elevation: 1,004 ft (306 m)

Population (2020)
  - Total: 759
  - Density: 372.5/sq mi (143.81/km^{2})
- Time zone: UTC−5 (Eastern (EST))
  - Summer (DST): UTC−4 (EDT)
- ZIP Code: 29682
- Area codes: 864, 821
- FIPS code: 45-66760
- GNIS feature ID: 2407347
- Website: www.sixmilesc.org

Six Mile is a town in Pickens County, South Carolina, United States. The 2010 census showed a population of 675, representing a 21% increase since 2000. The 2020 census showed a population of 678 representing a 0.30% increase since 2010. The average household income in Six Mile is $82,828 with a poverty rate at 6.54%. The median rental costs in recent years is $618 per month, and the median house value is $258,700

Six Mile was named "Six Mile" because it was located six miles from Fort Prince George. Many other landmarks in this area were named by their distance from Fort Prince George such as 12 Mile River, 18 Mile Creek, and Ninety Six.

== Geography ==
According to the United States Census Bureau, the town has a total area of 1.8 square miles (4.7 km^{2}), of which 1.8 square miles (4.7 km^{2}) is land and 0.55% is water.

=== Climate ===
The climate is mild and temperate with rainfall evenly distributed throughout the year. Winters are moderate with an average monthly temperature of 43. Snowfall occurs each winter, but significant amounts come only once every two or three years. Spring is a period of transition with March the month for heavy rains. As the showers decrease, a secondary dry period occurs late in April and early May. Steady rains typical of winter are likely in early spring. The average date of the last spring freeze falls around the end of March, which gives the area a growing season of approximately 180–200 days. Summers are warm and long with the average temperatures hovering around 79. Temperatures reach 90 on an average of 48 days a year. Six Mile's warm and pleasant autumn is the driest season of the year with the first frost usually occurring the first week of November.

== Demographics ==
Historical population
Census	Pop.	Note	%±
1920	134		—
1930	150		11.9%
1940	152		1.3%
1950	157		3.3%
1960	218		38.9%
1970	361		65.6%
1980	470		30.2%
1990	562		19.6%
2000	553		−1.6%
2010	675		22.1%
2020	759		12.4%
U.S. Decennial Census

The 2010 census showed a population of 675; this is a 21% growth increase since the 2000 census.

There were 200 households, out of which 37.5% had children under the age of 18 living with them, 67.0% were married couples living together, 7.0% had a female householder with no husband present, and 23.0% were non-families. Of all households, 20.0% were made up of individuals, and 8.0% had someone living alone who was 65 years of age or older. The average household size was 2.60 and the average family size was 3.02.

In the town, the population was spread out, with 24.1% under the age of 18, 8.1% from 18 to 24, 26.9% from 25 to 44, 25.5% from 45 to 64, and 15.4% who were 65 years of age or older. The median age was 40 years. For every 100 females, there were 96.8 males. For every 100 females age 18 and over, there were 97.2 males.

The median income for a household in the town in 2012 was $53,143, and the median income for a family was $57,667. Males had a median income of $42,792 versus $27,000 for females. The per capita income for the town was $25,260. About 3.5% of families and 4.5% of the population were below the poverty line, including 12.3% of those under age 18 and none of those age 65 or over.

== Notable people ==
- Blake Whiten, American country singer
