= South Carolina Highway 81 =

South Carolina Highway 81

Route information
- Maintained by SCDOT
- Length: 80.890 mi (130.180 km)
- Existed: 1926–present
- Tourist routes: Savannah River Scenic Byway; South Carolina Heritage Corridor: Nature Route; SC Heritage Corridor: Discovery Route

Major junctions
- South end: SC 28 near Lethia
- US 29 / SC 28 in Homeland Park; US 29 Bus. / SC 28 Bus. in Anderson; US 76 / US 178 in Anderson; I-85 near Anderson; US 25 in Welcome
- North end: Anderson Street and Vardry Street in Greenville

Location
- Country: United States
- State: South Carolina
- Counties: McCormick, Abbeville, Anderson, Greenville

Highway system
- South Carolina State Highway System; Interstate; US; State; Scenic
← SC 80	→ SC 83

South Carolina Highway 81 (SC 81) is an 80.890-mile-long (130.180 km) state highway in the U.S. state of South Carolina. The highway connects rural areas of McCormick County with Greenville, via Calhoun Falls, Iva, Homeland Park, and Anderson.

== Route description ==
SC 81 begins at an intersection with SC 28 east-southeast of Lethia within McCormick County. This intersection is within Sumter National Forest and just north of SC 28's crossing of Long Cane Creek. It travels to the northwest and curves to the west-southwest and travels through Lethia. It then curves to the southwest, passes just to the west of the John de la Howe School, and crosses the Little River. The highway then curves to the northwest. It travels through Willington, where it curves to the west-northwest. Just before Turman road, it leaves the national forest proper and begins traveling along the western edge of it. SC 81 curves to the north-northwest and enters Mount Carmel. There, it crosses over Bell Creek and then intersects SC 823, which is east of Mount Carmel Cemetery. It immediately curves to the northwest and leaves the forest. At Ike Road, SC 81 leaves Mount Carmel proper and travels along the edge of it until it intersects McCallister Chapel Road. A short distance later, it enters Abbeville County.

SC 81 enters Calhoun Falls and curves to the north. It intersects SC 72 (Russell Lake Boulevard). It passes Calhoun Falls Charter School and Edgewood Park. Upon leaving town, it passes Calhoun Falls State Park and then Salem Cemetery and curves to the north-northwest. It intersects the western terminus of SC 284 (Mitchel Place Road). It curves to the northwest and has an intersection with the western terminus of SC 71. It travels to the west-southwest and crosses over part of the Richard B. Russell Lake on the W.D. Nixon Bridge. Then, SC 81 enters Lowndesville, where it curves to a northwesterly routing east of Providence Cemetery. It curves to the north and crosses Charlies Creek. Just before intersecting Burdette Road, the highway enters Anderson County.

SC 81 heads to the north and enters Iva. At Hamilton Street, it intersects SC 184 which begins a concurrency through town. They intersect the western terminus of SC 413. Here SC 184 and SC 413 travel to the southeast on East Green Street. SC 81 leaves town and curves to the northwest. The highway begins curving to the north-northeast and passes Crescent High School. It heads to the north-northwest and enters Starr. There, it intersects the eastern terminus of SC 412 (Stones Throw Avenue). Then, it travels to the north-northeast and back to the north-northwest before it enters Homeland Park. The highway curves again to the north-northeast and passes Homeland Park Elementary School. Then, it intersects U.S. Route 29 (US 29; West Shockley Ferry Road). The two highways begin a short concurrency. One block later, they intersect SC 28 (Pearman Dairy Road). One block after that, US 29 splits off to the northeast. SC 81 heads in a fairly northerly direction and passes Orr Mill Park just before entering Anderson. At Sayre Street, US 29 Business (US 29 Bus.) comes from the west and begins traveling concurrent with SC 81. At the same intersection, SC 28 Bus. comes from the east and joins them. The three highway travel to the north and intersect US 76/US 178, which also joins the concurrency. The five-highway concurrency intersects the eastern terminus of SC 24 (Whitner Street). At Greenville Street, US 29 Bus./SC 28 Bus./SC 81 turns to the right for one block, where SC 28 Bus. turns left onto Main Street. US 29 Bus. and SC 81 pass AnMed Health Medical Center and then split at a point west of Anderson University. SC 81 heads northeast and passes Cater Lake Park. It then crosses over Cox Creek and then passes McCants Middle School. It leaves Anderson and passes Oaklawn Cemetery. The highway then passes T. L. Hanna High School. Then, it has an interchange with Interstate 85 (I-85). It turns left onto SC 8 (Easley Highway). The two highways travel concurrently to the north-northwest. When they split, SC 81 resumes its northeasterly direction. It passes by Wren Elementary School, Wren Middle School, and Wren High School. The highway intersects SC 86. It has a short easterly segment before curving back to the northeast. It crosses over Big Brushy Creek and enters Powdersville. It passes Pleasant View Cemetery and passes Concrete Primary School. Immediately after crossing over Craven Creek, it intersects SC 153. The highway passes Dolly Cooper Park. When, it crosses over the Saluda River, not only does it leave Powdersville, it enters Greenville County.

SC 81 starts off traveling along the southeastern edge of Welcome. It passes Carolina High School and Academy just before it intersects US 25 (White Horse Road). It travels under a railroad bridge, where it begins traveling along the Dunean-Judson line. Then, it enters Greenville for about eight blocks. At Vardry Street, SC 81 ends, and Anderson Street continues to the northeast for one block.

== History ==
=== South Carolina Highway 82 ===
South Carolina Highway 82
- Location: Lethia–Starr, South Carolina
- Existed: 1928–1949

South Carolina Highway 82 (SC 82) was a state highway that was established in 1928 on a path from SC 20 (now SC 28 just east-southeast of Lethia (and northwest of McCormick) to SC 81 in Starr. It traveled through Mount Carmel, Calhoun Falls, and Lowndesville. In 1949, it was decommissioned; most of its path was redesignated as SC 81.

==== Lethia alternate route ====
South Carolina Highway 82 Alternate
- Location: Lethia, South Carolina
- Existed: 1940–1947

South Carolina Highway 82 Alternate (SC 82 Alt.) was an alternate route that was established in 1940 from SC 82 (now SC 81) in Lethia north-northeast to SC 28 north-northeast of Lethia. In 1947, it was decommissioned and downgraded to a secondary road. Today, its path is known as Richey Road.

== Major intersections ==
County	Location	mi	km	Destinations	Notes
McCormick		0.000	0.000	SC 28 – McCormick, Abbeville, Anderson	Southern terminus
McCormick	Mount Carmel	9.710	15.627	SC 823 north – McCormick, Abbeville	Southern terminus of SC 823
Abbeville	Calhoun Falls	17.770	28.598	SC 72 (Russell Lake Boulevard) – Elberton, Abbeville	
Abbeville		25.340	40.781	SC 284 east (Mitchel Place Road) – Antreville	Western terminus of SC 284
Abbeville		26.720	43.002	SC 71 – Abbeville	Western terminus of SC 71
Anderson	Iva	34.730	55.893	SC 184 west (Hamilton Street) – Elberton	Southern end of SC 184 concurrency
Anderson	Iva	35.150	56.568	SC 184 east (East Green Street) / SC 413 east – Antreville, Belton, Abbeville	Northern end of SC 184 concurrency; western terminus of SC 413
Anderson	Starr	40.710	65.516	SC 412 west (Stones Throw Avenue) to SC 181	Eastern terminus of SC 412
Anderson	Homeland Park	48.340	77.796	US 29 south (West Shockley Ferry Road) – Hartwell	Southern end of US 29 concurrency
Anderson	Homeland Park	48.460	77.989	SC 28 (Pearman Dairy Road) to I-85	
Anderson	Homeland Park	48.570	78.166	US 29 north (West Shockley Ferry Road) – Greenville	Northern end of US 29 concurrency
Anderson	Anderson	49.790	80.129	US 29 Bus. south / SC 28 Bus. east (Sayre Street) – Hartwell	Southern end of US 29 Bus. and SC 28 Bus. concurrencies
Anderson	Anderson	50.280	80.918	US 76 east / US 178 east (River Street)	Southern end of US 76/US 178 concurrency
Anderson	Anderson	50.530	81.320	SC 24 west (Whitner Street) – Anderson Regional Airport	Eastern terminus of SC 24
Anderson	Anderson	50.910	81.932	US 76 west / US 178 west (Murray Avenue) to I-85 south	Northern end of US 76/US 178 concurrency
Anderson	Anderson	51.020	82.109	SC 28 Bus. west (Main Street)	Northern end of SC 28 Bus. concurrency
Anderson	Anderson	51.540	82.946	US 29 Bus. north (Boulevard) – Anderson University, Williamston	Northern end of US 29 Bus. concurrency
Anderson		60.170– 60.208	96.834– 96.895	I-85 – Atlanta, Greenville	I-85 exit 27
Anderson		65.500	105.412	SC 8 south (Easley Highway) – Pelzer	Southern end of SC 8 concurrency
Anderson		67.470	108.582	SC 8 north (Pelzer Highway) to SC 88 – Easley	Northern end of SC 8 concurrency
Anderson		69.140	111.270	SC 86 – Easley, Piedmont	
Anderson	Powdersville	75.210	121.039	SC 153 to I-85 – Easley	
Greenville	Welcome	78.310	126.028	US 25 (White Horse Road) to I-85 – Easley	
Greenville	Greenville	80.890	130.180	Vardry Street (SC 124) / Anderson Street north	Northern terminus; Anderson Street continues past terminus.
1.000 mi = 1.609 km; 1.000 km = 0.621 mi: Concurrency terminus

== See also ==
- SC National Heritage Corridor | Belton Alliance
