= South Carolina Highway 412 =

State highway in South Carolina, United States

South Carolina Highway 412

Route information
- Maintained by SCDOT
- Length: 7.030 mi (11.314 km)
- Tourist routes: Savannah River Scenic Byway

Major junctions
- West end: US 29 in Holland Store
- SC 187 near Holland Store; SC 181 in Starr
- East end: SC 81 in Starr

Location
- Country: United States
- State: South Carolina
- Counties: Anderson

Highway system
- South Carolina State Highway System; Interstate; US; State; Scenic
← SC 410	→ SC 413

South Carolina Highway 412 (SC 412) is a 7.030-mile (11.314 km) state highway in the U.S. state of South Carolina. The highway connects rural areas of Anderson County with Starr.

== Route description ==
SC 412 begins at an intersection with U.S. Route 29 (US 29) west-northwest of Starr, within unincorporated Anderson County community of Holland Store. It travels in a fairly east-southeasterly direction. It crosses over Lucas Creek before it intersects SC 187. The highway crosses over Big Generostee and Generostee creeks. A short distance after crossing Weems Creek, it passes Starr–Iva Middle School. In Starr, it intersects the northern terminus of SC 181 (Smith–McGee Road) just before it meets its eastern terminus, an intersection with SC 81. Here, the roadway continues as First Avenue.

== Major intersections ==
The entire route is in Anderson County.

Location	mi	km	Destinations	Notes
Holland Store	0.000	0.000	US 29 – Hartwell, Ga., Anderson	Western terminus
	1.500	2.414	SC 187 – Townville, Pendleton, Elberton, Ga.	
Starr	6.640	10.686	SC 181 south (Smith–McGee Road) – Hartwell, Ga., Elberton, Ga.	Northern terminus of SC 181
Starr	7.030	11.314	SC 81 / First Avenue – Iva, Anderson	Eastern terminus
1.000 mi = 1.609 km; 1.000 km = 0.621 mi
