= South Carolina Highway 187 =

State highway in South Carolina, United States

South Carolina Highway 187

Route information
- Maintained by SCDOT
- Length: 30.334 mi (48.818 km)
- Tourist routes: Savannah River Scenic Byway; South Carolina Heritage Corridor: Nature Route; South Carolina Heritage Corridor: Discovery Route

Major junctions
- South end: SC 184 near Iva
- US 29 near Starr; I-85 near Centerville
- North end: US 76 / SC 28 near Pendleton

Location
- Country: United States
- State: South Carolina
- Counties: Anderson

Highway system
- South Carolina State Highway System; Interstate; US; State; Scenic
← SC 186	→ SC 188

South Carolina Highway 187 (SC 187) is a 30.334-mile-long (48.818 km) state highway in the U.S. state of South Carolina. The highway travels through mostly rural areas of Anderson County.

== Route description ==
SC 187 begins at an intersection with SC 184 (Elberton Highway) southwest of Iva, within Anderson County. It travels in a fairly northerly direction. It passes Mountain View Cemetery and Poplar Spring Cemetery before intersecting SC 181 (Smith–McGee Road). They have a brief concurrency. SC 187 travels to the northwest and crosses over Weems Creek and then Buchanan Creek. It has an intersection with SC 412 (Rainey Road) and one with U.S. Route 29 (US 29). The highway begins curving to the northeast. In West Gate, it intersects SC 24. The two highways travel concurrently to the northwest and cross over part of Lake Hartwell on the Calvin Wesley Belcher Bridge. A short distance later, they split at the Portman Shoals Intersection, with SC 187 traveling to the north. It passes by a KOA Kampground just before an interchange with Interstate 85 (I-85). Just to the west of La France, the highway passes Pendleton High School. Farther to the northeast, it meets its northern terminus, an intersection with US 76/SC 28, just south of Pendleton.

== Major intersections ==
The entire route is in Anderson County.

Location	mi	km	Destinations	Notes
	0.000	0.000	SC 184 (Elberton Highway) – Elberton, Iva	Southern terminus
	5.580	8.980	SC 181 south (Smith–McGee Road) – Hartwell	Southern end of SC 181 concurrency
	6.400	10.300	SC 181 north (Smith-McGee Road) – Starr	Northern end of SC 181 concurrency
	10.710	17.236	SC 412 (Rainey Road) – Starr, Iva	
	12.360	19.891	US 29 – Hartwell, Anderson	
West Gate	20.310	32.686	SC 24 east – Anderson	Southern end of SC 24 concurrency
Lake Hartwell	21.959 22.212	35.340 35.747	Calvin Wesley Belcher Bridge	
	23.087	37.155	SC 24 west – Townville, Fairplay	Northern end of SC 24 concurrency; Portman Shoals Intersection
	24.354– 24.388	39.194– 39.249	I-85 – Atlanta, Greenville	I-85 exit 14
	30.334	48.818	US 76 / SC 28 – Clemson, Pendleton, Anderson, Greenville	Northern terminus
1.000 mi = 1.609 km; 1.000 km = 0.621 mi: Concurrency terminus
