= South Carolina Highway 413 =

State highway in South Carolina, United States

South Carolina Highway 413

Route information
- Maintained by SCDOT
- Length: 17.190 mi (27.665 km)

Major junctions
- South end: SC 184 in Iva
- SC 28 near Iva; SC 185 in Ebenezer Crossroads; SC 252 near Belton
- North end: US 76 / US 178 near Belton

Location
- Country: United States
- State: South Carolina
- Counties: Anderson

Highway system
- South Carolina State Highway System; Interstate; US; State; Scenic
← SC 412	→ SC 414

South Carolina Highway 413 (SC 413) is a 17.190-mile (27.665 km) state highway in the U.S. state of South Carolina. The highway connects Iva and the Belton area.

== Route description ==
SC 413 begins at an intersection with SC 184 (East Green Street) in Iva, Anderson County. The official designation for the highway begins here however signage for SC 413 is shown along SC 184 for one-block to SC 81. SR 413 travels northeast on East Front Street through Iva. It travels to the northeast and crosses over Wilson Creek and Jordan Creek. After it intersects Flat Rock Road, it passes Carswell Baptist Cemetery. The highway crosses Governors Creek just before an intersection with SC 28 (Abbeville Highway). Then, it crosses over the Rocky River. SC 413 enters Ebenezer Crossroads, which passes Ebenezer Fire Department 23 and intersects SC 185. It crosses Long Branch before intersecting SC 252 (Honea Path Highway). Just a short distance later, it meets its northern terminus, an intersection with U.S. Route 76 (US 76) and US 178 (Belton Highway). Here, the roadway continues as Rutledge Road.

== Major intersections ==
The entire route is in Anderson County.

Location	mi	km	Destinations	Notes
Iva	0.000	0.000	SC 184 (East Green Street) / East Front Street – Antreville, Abbeville, Calhoun Falls, Elberton	Southern terminus
	6.220	10.010	SC 28 (Abbeville Highway) – Anderson, Antreville	
Ebenezer Crossroads	9.610	15.466	SC 185 – Due West	
	15.230	24.510	SC 252 (Honea Path Highway) – Anderson, Honea Path	
	17.190	27.665	US 76 / US 178 (Belton Highway) – Anderson, Belton	Northern terminus
1.000 mi = 1.609 km; 1.000 km = 0.621 mi
