= South Carolina Highway 59 =

State highway in South Carolina, United States

South Carolina Highway 59

Route information
- Maintained by SCDOT
- Length: 15.697 mi (25.262 km)
- Existed: 1942–present

Major junctions
- South end: I-85 near Fair Play
- SC 182 / SC 243 in Fair Play; SC 24 in rural Oconee County; SC 130 in Seneca
- North end: US 76 / US 123 / SC 28 in Seneca

Location
- Country: United States
- State: South Carolina
- Counties: Oconee

Highway system
- South Carolina State Highway System; Interstate; US; State; Scenic
← SC 58	→ SC 60

South Carolina Highway 59 (SC 59) is a 15.6-mile-long (25.1 km) state highway in the northwestern part of the U.S. state of South Carolina. The highway travels in a south-north orientation from just southwest of Fair Play north and then northeast to Seneca, completely within Oconee County.

== Route description ==
SC 59 begins at an interchange with Interstate 85 (I-85) just southwest of Fair Play. The route heads northeast into town, and intersects SC 182/SC 243. After leaving town, SC 59 heads northwest and turns to the northwest to intersect SC 24. The road heads on its northeast trajectory until it meets its northern terminus, an intersection with U.S. Route 76 (US 76), US 123, SC 28 in Seneca.

== History ==
Established in 1942 as a renumbering of SC 181 and part of SC 182, SC 59 traversed from the Georgia state line to Fair Play, then north to Seneca ending at US 76/SC 13/SC 28. By 1963, SC 59 was truncated at I-85 due to Lake Hartwell submerging the route to Georgia. The portion south of I-85 that was not submerged were downgraded to secondary road Lakeshore Drive (S-37-11). In 2000, SC 59 was extended northwest along West North 1st Street in Seneca, to its current northern terminus with US 76/US 123/SC 28.

Historically, there was one previous SC 59 between 1930-1942; it ran from SC 55 near Clover to SC 58/SC 163 near Lake Wylie. In 1942, the highway was renumbered as SC 557.

Before the construction of Lake Hartwell, SC 59 continued into Georgia as Georgia State Route 59 (SR 59). With the I-85 bridge less than 1 mile (1.6 km) away from the old crossing, the states had no need to directly reconnect the roads. SC 59 is not concurrent with I-85 on either side of the lake and the two highways do not officially connect. The section of SR 59 between SR 77 and the shoreline of Lake Hartwell was transferred to county maintenance between 1990 and 1993.

== Junction list ==
The entire route is in Oconee County.

Location	mi	km	Destinations	Notes
	0.000– 0.024	0.000– 0.039	I-85 – Greenville, Atlanta	Southern terminus; I-85 exit 2
Fair Play	0.910	1.465	SC 182 west / SC 243 north – Westminster, Anderson	Eastern terminus of SC 182; western terminus of SC 243
	7.063	11.367	SC 24 west (West Oak Highway) – Westminster	Southern end of SC 24 concurrency
	7.372	11.864	SC 24 east (West Oak Highway) – Anderson	Northern end of SC 24 concurrency
Seneca	14.177	22.816	SC 130 north (West North 1st Street) – Clemson	Southern terminus of SC 130
Seneca	15.697	25.262	US 76 / US 123 / SC 28 – Westminster, Walhalla, Clemson	Northern terminus
1.000 mi = 1.609 km; 1.000 km = 0.621 mi: Concurrency terminus
