= South Carolina Highway 243 =

State highway in South Carolina, United States

South Carolina Highway 243

Route information
- Maintained by SCDOT
- Length: 8.380 mi (13.486 km)
- Existed: 1940–present

Major junctions
- West end: SC 59 / SC 182 in Fair Play
- East end: I-85 / SC 24 near Townville

Location
- Country: United States
- State: South Carolina
- Counties: Oconee, Anderson

Highway system
- South Carolina State Highway System; Interstate; US; State; Scenic
← SC 230	→ SC 245

South Carolina Highway 243 (SC 243) is a 8.380-mile-long (13.486 km) state highway in the U.S. state of South Carolina. The highway travels on an east–west direction (though signed as north–south) from SC 59 and SC 182 in Fair Play to Interstate 85 (I-85) exit 11 and SC 24. The highway closely parallels I-85 to the north.

== Route description ==
SC 243 begins at an intersection with SC 59 and SC 182 in the census designated place of Fair Play, Oconee County. Numerous businesses surround the intersection which also is the southern terminus of SC 182. SC 243 travels east along East Fair Play Boulevard past houses, a store, churches, a cemetery, and a post office. Whitfield Road splits off from the road and travels south to I-85's exit 4. SC 243 continues east-northeast into Anderson County through a mix of farmland and woods. At the highway's end, it intersects SC 24 in front of a cafe. On the opposite side of SC 24, I-85's exit 11 southbound on and off-ramps are present. The northbound ramps of the interchange are located south of this point near SC 24.

== Major intersections ==
County	Location	mi	km	Destinations	Notes
Oconee	Fair Play	0.000	0.000	SC 59 (West Fair Play Boulevard) / SC 182 north to I-85 – Seneca, Atlanta, Westminster	Western terminus of SC 243; southern terminus of SC 182
Oconee		1.030	1.658	Whitfield Road east to I-85 – Glenn Ferry access, Weldon Island Recreation Area	Western terminus of Whitfield Road
Anderson		8.380	13.486	I-85 / SC 24 – Townville, Westminster, Greenville, Atlanta, Anderson	Eastern terminus; I-85 exit 11
1.000 mi = 1.609 km; 1.000 km = 0.621 mi
