= Charlie Creek =

Charlie Creek may refer to:

- Charlie Creek (Florida), a stream in Hardee County and Polk County
- Charlie Creek (South Dakota), a stream
- Charlies Creek, a stream in Georgia

== See also ==
- Charley Creek (disambiguation)
