= South Carolina Highway 182 =

State highway in South Carolina, United States

South Carolina Highway 182

Route information
- Maintained by SCDOT
- Length: 9.580 mi (15.418 km)

Major junctions
- South end: SC 59 / SC 243 in Fair Play
- North end: SC 24 in Oakway

Location
- Country: United States
- State: South Carolina
- Counties: Oconee

Highway system
- South Carolina State Highway System; Interstate; US; State; Scenic
← SC 181	→ SC 183

South Carolina Highway 182 (SC 182) is a 9.580-mile-long (15.418 km) state highway in the U.S. state of South Carolina. The highway connects Fair Play and Oakway.

== Route description ==
SC 182 begins at an intersection with SC 59 and SC 243 (Fair Play Boulevard) in Fair Play, within Oconee County. It travels to the west-southwest and almost immediately curves to the north-northwest. The highway curves to the northeast and enters Oakway. Just before passing the Oakway Intermediate School, it curves to the northwest. A short distance later, it meets its northern terminus, an intersection with SC 24 (West Oak Highway).

== Major intersections ==
The entire route is in Oconee County.

Location	mi	km	Destinations	Notes
Fair Play	0.000	0.000	SC 59 / SC 243 (Fair Play Boulevard) to I-85 – Anderson, Atlanta, Seneca	Southern terminus
Oakway	9.580	15.418	SC 24 (West Oak Highway) – Westminster, Anderson	Northern terminus
1.000 mi = 1.609 km; 1.000 km = 0.621 mi
