= South Carolina Highway 153 =

State highway in South Carolina

South Carolina Highway 153

Route information
- Maintained by SCDOT
- Length: 11.510 mi (18.524 km)
- Existed: 1960s–present

Major junctions
- South end: Brown Road near Powdersville
- I-185 near Powdersville; I-85 in Powdersville; US 123 near Easley
- North end: Saluda Dam Road near Easley

Location
- Country: United States
- State: South Carolina
- Counties: Greenville, Anderson, Pickens

Highway system
- South Carolina State Highway System; Interstate; US; State; Scenic
← SC 151	→ SC 154

South Carolina Highway 153 (SC 153) is a 11.510-mile (18.524 km) state highway, providing a major connection between U.S. Route 123 (US 123) and Interstate 85 (I-85), and also serving as a primary commercial corridor for the suburban Greenville community of Powdersville.

== Route description ==
The route travels generally in a southeast to northwest direction, starting unsigned on Brown Road in western Greenville County. The highway almost immediately comes to an interchange with Southern Connector Toll Road (I-185). The two-lane road crosses over the Saluda River into Anderson County where it then meets I-85 at exit 40. From I-85 to US 123 in Pickens County, SC 153 is a four-lane road that is relatively developed with commercial land uses. Continuing north as a two-lane with turn median and flanked with a multi-use path, SC 153 ends at Saluda Dam Road.

== History ==
On December 8, 2020, SC 153 was extended 4.4 miles (7.1 km) north from US 123 to Saluda Dam Road (S-39-36).

== Junction list ==
County	Location	mi	km	Destinations	Notes
Greenville		0.000	0.000	Brown Road	
Greenville		0.380– 0.410	0.612– 0.660	I-185 – Columbia, Atlanta	I-185 exit 12
Anderson		1.500– 1.527	2.414– 2.457	I-85 / US 29 – Greenville, Atlanta	I-85 exit 40
Anderson	Powdersville	2.950	4.748	SC 81 (Anderson Road)	
Pickens		7.110	11.442	US 123 – Easley, Greenville	Interchange
Pickens		11.510	18.524	Saluda Dam Road	Northern terminus; opened on December 8, 2020
1.000 mi = 1.609 km; 1.000 km = 0.621 mi
