= Georgia State Route 368 =

Highway in Georgia

State Route 368
- Anderson Highway
- SR 368 highlighted in red

Route information
- Maintained by GDOT
- Length: 10.6 mi (17.1 km)
- Existed: 1970–present

Major junctions
- West end: SR 77 north of Elberton
- East end: SC 184 at the South Carolina state line in northeast Elbert County

Location
- Country: United States
- State: Georgia
- Counties: Elbert

Highway system
- Georgia State Highway System; Interstate; US; State; Special
← SR 367	→ SR 369

State Route 368 (SR 368) is a 10.6-mile-long (17.1 km) state highway in the northeastern part of the U.S. state of Georgia. It is entirely within Elbert County and connects the Elberton area with South Carolina. It was originally built in 1940 as SR 82 and was redesignated as SR 368 in 1970.

== Route description ==
SR 368 begins at an intersection with SR 77 (Hartwell Highway) north of Elberton and travels to the northeast, through unincorporated and generally rural areas of the county. The highway crosses the backwaters of Lake Russell, before crossing over the main channel of the lake and terminating at the South Carolina state line. There, the roadway continues as South Carolina Highway 184.

SR 368 is not part of the National Highway System, a system of roadways important to the nation's economy, defense, and mobility.

== History ==
State Route 82
- Location: Northeast of Elberton
- Length: 10.6 mi (17.1 km)
- Existed: 1940–1970

The highway that would eventually become SR 368 was built in 1940 as SR 82. This highway was on a more eastern alignment than the current route. By 1942, the entire route was paved. In 1943, the highway was shifted to its current alignment. In 1970, the entire length of SR 82 was redesignated as SR 368.

== Major intersections ==
The entire route is in Elbert County.

Location	mi	km	Destinations	Notes
	0.00	0.00	SR 77 (Hartwell Highway) – Elberton, Hartwell	
	10.62	17.09	Sergeant Fred M. Newton Bridge over the Savannah River	
	10.62	17.09	SC 184 (Elberton Highway) – Iva	Continuation beyond South Carolina state line
1.000 mi = 1.609 km; 1.000 km = 0.621 mi
