= Blaine, South Carolina =

Coordinates: 34.782°N 82.546°W

Blaine is a historic community located in Anderson County, South Carolina.

== Sources ==
- Von Hasseln, J.H. Map of Anderson County, South Carolina. Anderson, South Carolina, 1897.
- Blaine, South Carolina. Geographic Names Information System, U.S. Geological Survey.
