= Kip Anderson =

American singer (1938–2007)

- Born: Kipling Taquana Anderson; January 24, 1938; Starr, Anderson County, South Carolina, U.S.
- Died: August 29, 2007 (aged 69) Anderson, South Carolina, U.S.
- Genres: Soul blues, R&B, Southern soul
- Occupations: Singer, pianist, songwriter
- Instrument: Vocals
- Years active: Late 1950s–1990s
- Labels: Vee-Jay, Checker, Excello, Ichiban

Kipling Taquana "Kip" Anderson (January 24, 1938 – August 29, 2007) was an American soul blues and R&B singer and songwriter. He is best known for his 1967 single, "A Knife and a Fork". He recorded for many record labels, worked as a radio DJ, and maintained a career lasting from the late 1950s to the 1990s, despite serving a decade-long custodial sentence. At various times Anderson worked with Sam Cooke, the Drifters, Jerry Butler and Jackie Wilson.

== Biography ==
He was born Kipling Taquana Anderson in Starr, Anderson County, South Carolina.

Anderson had his first musical exposure in church, where he sang and played the piano. After featuring in his high school band, Anderson met his future business partner, Charles Derrick, at radio station WOIC, in Columbia. In 1959, Anderson's debut single, "I Wanna Be the Only One", was released by Vee-Jay Records. For his follow-up release, "Oh My Linda", he was accompanied by the guitarist Mickey Baker. Lack of commercial gains from recording led Anderson to find work as a disc jockey.

Everlast Records released Anderson's third single, "I Will Cry" (1962), and "Here I Am, Try Me", and "That's When the Crying Begins" (1964) followed; the latter reached number 79 on the Billboard Hot 100. His stock rose further with "I'll Get Along", "Woman How Do You Make Me Love You Like I Do", and "Without a Woman" (1966).

In 1967, Anderson released "A Knife and a Fork" for Checker, recorded at FAME Studios in Alabama. "A Knife and a Fork" was a midtempo warning to his girlfriend about her consumption of food: "girl, you gonna let a knife and a fork dig your grave". The single entered the Billboard R&B chart. A follow-up release, "You'll Lose a Good Thing", issued by Excello Records, also made the Top 40 on the R&B chart. "I Went Off and Cried" (1968) may be his best-remembered recording, next to "A Knife and a Fork". A cover version of "A Knife and a Fork" was recorded by Rockpile for the 1980 album, Seconds of Pleasure.

A dependency on heroin started to affect his work by 1970, and Excello cancelled his recording contract. He continued to record and perform in the 1970s, but a ten-year prison sentence in 1974 for possession of heroin halted his activities. He later stated, "It probably saved my life". While in prison he formed a gospel group with other inmates, who performed under surveillance at local churches and community events.

Upon his release from prison, Anderson recorded a gospel album, before issuing more soul-based music for Ichiban Records. He also revived his career as a DJ when he moved back to Anderson County. He also hosted a gospel show on WRIX-FM and served as vice president of Electric City Record's gospel division. In 1996, Anderson duetted with Nappy Brown on the Best of Both Worlds joint album.

Anderson died in Anderson, South Carolina, in August 2007, at the age of 69.

== Discography ==
=== Albums ===
- A Dog Don't Wear No Shoes (1992) - Ichiban
- A Knife and a Fork (1993) - Ichiban

=== Singles ===
- "I Wanna Be the Only One" / "The Home Fires Are Brighter After All" (1959), Vee Jay
- "I Wanna Be the Only One" / Making Tracks" (1959), Derrick Records
- "Oh My Linda" / "'Til Your Love is Mine (1960), Sharp Records
- "I Feel Good" / "I Will Cry" (1961), Everlast Records
- "That's When the Crying Begins" / "I Done You Wrong" (1964), ABC Records
- "I Can't" / "I'll Get Along" (1965), Tomorrow Records
- "Tell Her I Love Her" / "Woman How Do You Make Me Love You Like I Do" (1965), Checker Records
- "I Get Carried Away" / "Here I Am, Try Me" (1965), Tomorrow Records
- "If That Don't Make You Cry" / "Without a Woman" (1966), Checker
- "Take It Like a Man" / "A Knife and a Fork" (1967), Checker
- "Blue Moon" / "Unchained Melody" (1967), Concord
- "You'll Lose a Good Thing" / "I'm Out of Love" (1967), Excello Records
- "Letter From my Darling" / "Watch You Work it Out" (1968), Excello
- "That's All I Can Do" / "I Went Off and Cried" (1968), Excello
- "Frozen Heart" / "Abide in Me" (1969), Eydie
- "Jesus Sings with Me (Part 1)" / "Jesus Sings with Me (Part 2)" (1988), Lorna
- "I Could'a Been Sleepin'" / "He Never Left Me Alone" (1989), Lorna
- "Your Sweetness Is My Weakness" / "A Dog Don't Wear No Shoes" (1992), Ichiban

== See also ==
- List of soul-blues musicians
