= Lake Secession, South Carolina =

- CDP
- Seal

- Location within the state of South Carolina
- Coordinates: 34°16′56″N 82°35′25″W
- Country: United States
- State: South Carolina
- County: Abbeville

Area
  - Total: 7.37 sq mi (19.09 km^{2})
  - Land: 5.81 sq mi (15.04 km^{2})
  - Water: 1.56 sq mi (4.05 km^{2})
- Elevation: 548 ft (167 m)

Population (2020)
  - Total: 1,058
  - Density: 182.2/sq mi (70.36/km^{2})
- Time zone: UTC-5 (Eastern (EST))
  - Summer (DST): UTC-4 (EDT)
- FIPS code: 45-39512
- GNIS feature ID: 2403205
- Website: www.lakesecession.com

Lake Secession is a census-designated place (CDP) in Abbeville County, South Carolina. The population was 1,083 at the 2010 census.

== Geography ==
The adjacent Secession Lake is a reservoir on the Rocky River, a tributary of the Savannah River. The spillway elevation is 548 feet (167 m) above sea level. The reservoir extends north into Anderson County, but the CDP consists only of residences built around the lake within Abbeville County. The Antreville CDP borders the Lake Secession CDP to the east.

== Demographics ==
Historical population
Census	Pop.	Note	%±
2020	1,058		—
U.S. Decennial Census

As of the census of 2000, there were 928 people, 413 households, and 298 families residing in the CDP. The population density was 164.7 inhabitants per square mile (63.6/km^{2}). There were 739 housing units at an average density of 131.1 per square mile (50.6/km^{2}). The racial makeup of the CDP was 97.84% White, 1.19% African American, 0.11% Native American, 0.11% Asian, and 0.75% from two or more races.

There were 413 households, out of which 20.6% had children under the age of 18 living with them, 61.5% were married couples living together, 6.1% had a female householder with no husband present, and 27.8% were non-families. 24.0% of all households were made up of individuals, and 6.3% had someone living alone who was 65 years of age or older. The average household size was 2.25 and the average family size was 2.63.

In the CDP, the population was spread out, with 18.6% under the age of 18, 5.1% from 18 to 24, 23.5% from 25 to 44, 37.5% from 45 to 64, and 15.3% who were 65 years of age or older. The median age was 47 years. For every 100 females, there were 107.6 males. For every 100 females age 18 and over, there were 107.4 males.

The median income for a household in the CDP was $40,795, and the median income for a family was $43,558. Males had a median income of $49,250 versus $23,438 for females. The per capita income for the CDP was $20,663. About 2.0% of families and 4.4% of the population were below the poverty line, including none of those under the age of 18 and 17.0% of those 65 and older.

== Education ==
It is in the Abbeville County School District.
