= Georgia State Route 181 =

State highway in Georgia, United States

State Route 181
- Smith McGee Highway
- SR 181 highlighted in red

Route information
- Maintained by GDOT
- Length: 2.95 mi (4.75 km)

Major junctions
- West end: US 29 / SR 8 south of Lake Hartwell
- East end: SC 181 at the South Carolina state line southeast of Lake Hartwell

Location
- Country: United States
- State: Georgia
- Counties: Hart

Highway system
- Georgia State Highway System; Interstate; US; State; Special
← SR 180	→ SR 182

State Route 181 (SR 181) is a state highway in the northeastern part of the U.S. state of Georgia. It runs west–east through portions of Hart county.

== Route description ==
The route begins at an intersection with US 29/SR 8 south of Lake Hartwell. It heads southeast, and then curves northeast until it meets its eastern terminus at the South Carolina state line southeast of Lake Hartwell. When SR 181 reaches the state line at the Savannah River, the roadway continues east as South Carolina Highway 181.

== Major intersections ==
The entire route is in Hart County.

Location	mi	km	Destinations	Notes
	0.0	0.0	US 29 / SR 8 – Hartwell	Western terminus
	2.7	4.3	SR 77 Spur to SR 77	Eastern terminus of SR 77 Spur
Savannah River	2.9	4.7	SC 181 north (Smith McGee Road) – Starr	Continuation beyond South Carolina state line over the Savannah River
1.000 mi = 1.609 km; 1.000 km = 0.621 mi
