= South Carolina Highway 24 =

State highway in South Carolina, United States

South Carolina Highway 24

Route information
- Maintained by SCDOT
- Length: 30.660 mi (49.342 km)
- Existed: 1938–present
- Tourist routes: Savannah River Scenic Byway; South Carolina Heritage Corridor: Nature Route; South Carolina Heritage Corridor: Discovery Route

Major junctions
- West end: US 76 / US 123 in Westminster
- I-85 / SC 243 near Townville
- East end: US 76 / US 178 / US 29 Bus. / SC 81 / SC 28 Bus. in Anderson

Location
- Country: United States
- State: South Carolina
- Counties: Oconee, Anderson

Highway system
- South Carolina State Highway System; Interstate; US; State; Scenic
← SC 23	→ US 25

South Carolina Highway 24 (SC 24) is a 30.660-mile-long (49.342 km) state highway in the U.S. state of South Carolina. The highway connects Westminster and Anderson.

== Route description ==
SC 24 begins at an intersection with U.S. Route 76 (US 76) and US 123 (East Main Street) in Westminster, within Oconee County, where the roadway continues as Oak Street. It travels to the southwest and immediately curves to the southeast before leaving the city limits. The highway passes by Pleasant Hill Cemetery and travels through rural areas of the county. Then, it has an intersection with SC 11. The highway continues traveling through rural areas of the county and has an intersection with SC 182 in Oakway. During a short east-northeast section, there is a very brief concurrency with SC 59. The highway passes by Hays Cemetery. SC 24 enters Anderson County and almost immediately has an interchange with Interstate 85 (I-85) which includes an intersection with SC 243 at its northern terminus. It crosses over part of Lake Hartwell on an unnamed bridge. A short distance later, it begins a concurrency with SC 187 at the Portman Shoals Intersection. The two highways cross over another part of the lake on the Calvin Wesley Belcher Bridge. It then enters West Gate, where SC 187 leaves the concurrency. SC 24 travels along the southern city limits of Centerville and passes just north of Anderson Regional Airport. In West Anderson, the highway passes Lakeside Middle School and intersects SC 28. About one mile (1.6 km) later, it enters the city limits of Anderson. Just under 4,000 feet (1,200 m) later, it meets its eastern terminus, an intersection with US 29 Business (US 29 Bus.)/US 76/US 178/SC 28 Bus./SC 81 (Murray Avenue).

== History ==
The first SC 24 was an original state highway, which operated as a spur from SC 12 in Hibernia, to Ninety Six. By 1926, SC 24 was extended southeast on new primary routing through Pelion to SC 6 in North. In 1928, SC 24 was extended south, from North, to SC 64 in Olar. In 1929, SC 24 was extended west, in concurrency with US 25 to Hodges, then replacing SC 25 to Donalds, and SC 15 to SC 2 in Clemson. That same year, SC 24 was rerouted to avoid Ninety Six, with its former route becoming SC 246. By 1930, SC 24 was rerouted at North, replacing SC 6 to Orangeburg then in concurrency with SC 2, through Bowman and Rosinville, to US 78. In 1931, SC 24 was extended west along SC 2, through Seneca and Walhalla, then solo through Mountain Rest to the Georgia state line; SC 24 reached its longest at approximately 231 miles (372 km). In 1933, US 178 replaced SC 24 between Anderson and US 78; SC 24 remained west of Anderson to Georgia. In 1938, SC 24 was renumbered as part of SC 28.

The second and current SC 24 was established in 1938 as a renumbering of SC 18, between Westminster and Anderson. By 1964, SC 24 eastern terminus changed from Market and Main Streets to Whitier and Main Streets, coinciding with the elimination of SC 80.

== Major intersections ==
County	Location	mi	km	Destinations	Notes
Oconee	Westminster	0.000	0.000	US 76 (East Main Street) / US 123 – Long Creek, Toccoa, Seneca	Western terminus
Oconee		3.920	6.309	SC 11 north (Cherokee Foothills Scenic Highway) to I-85 north – Walhalla	Interchange
Oconee	Oakway	5.710	9.189	SC 182 south (Oakway Road) – Fair Play	Northern terminus of SC 182
Oconee		8.192	13.184	SC 59 south – Fair Play	Western end of SC 59 concurrency
Oconee		8.501	13.681	SC 59 north – Seneca	Eastern end of SC 59 concurrency
Anderson		18.810– 18.912	30.272– 30.436	I-85 / SC 243 west – Greenville, Atlanta	I-85 exit 11; eastern terminus of SC 243
Anderson		21.513	34.622	SC 187 north – Pendleton	Western end of SC 187 concurrency; Portman Shoals Intersection
Anderson	Lake Hartwell	22.388– 22.641	36.030– 36.437	Calvin Wesley Belcher Bridge	
Anderson	West Gate	24.290	39.091	SC 187 south – Pendleton	Eastern end of SC 187 concurrency
Anderson	West Anderson	28.780	46.317	SC 28 (Pearman Dairy Road)	
Anderson	Anderson	30.660	49.342	US 76 / US 178 / US 29 Bus. / SC 81 / SC 28 Bus. (Murray Avenue)	Eastern terminus
1.000 mi = 1.609 km; 1.000 km = 0.621 mi: Concurrency terminus
