= South Carolina Highway 181 =

State highway in South Carolina, United States

South Carolina Highway 181
- Smith–McGee Road

Route information
- Maintained by SCDOT
- Length: 6.430 mi (10.348 km)
- Existed: 1942–present

Major junctions
- South end: SR 181 at the Georgia state line near Starr
- North end: SC 412 in Starr

Location
- Country: United States
- State: South Carolina
- Counties: Anderson

Highway system
- South Carolina State Highway System; Interstate; US; State; Scenic
← SC 179	→ SC 182

South Carolina Highway 181 (SC 181) is a 6.430-mile-long (10.348 km) state highway in the U.S. state of South Carolina. The highway connects the Georgia state line with Starr.

== Route description ==
SC 181 begins at the Georgia state line at a point southwest of Starr, within Anderson County, where the roadway crosses over the Savannah River and continues as Georgia State Route 181 (Smith-McGee Highway). It travels to the northeast and has a brief concurrency with SC 187. The highway continues to the northeast and enters Starr. There, it meets its northern terminus, an intersection with SC 412 (Rainey Road/Stones Throw Avenue). Here, the roadway continues as Smith-McGee Road.

== Major intersections ==
The entire route is in Anderson County.

Location	mi	km	Destinations	Notes
	0.000	0.000	SR 181 west (Smith–McGee Highway) – Hartwell	Continuation beyond Georgia state line over the Savannah River
	2.370	3.814	SC 187 south – Elberton	Southern end of SC 187 concurrency
	3.190	5.134	SC 187 north	Northern end of SC 187 concurrency
Starr	6.430	10.348	SC 412 (Rainey Road / Stones Throw Avenue) to SC 81 / Smith–McGee Road – Starr, Anderson	Northern terminus
1.000 mi = 1.609 km; 1.000 km = 0.621 mi: Concurrency terminus
