= South Carolina Highway 823 =

State highway in South Carolina, United States

South Carolina Highway 823

Route information
- Maintained by SCDOT
- Length: 11.140 mi (17.928 km)

Major junctions
- South end: SC 81 in Mount Carmel
- North end: SC 72 southwest of Abbeville

Location
- Country: United States
- State: South Carolina
- Counties: McCormick, Abbeville

Highway system
- South Carolina State Highway System; Interstate; US; State; Scenic
← SC 802	→ SC 901

South Carolina Highway 823 (SC 823) is a 11.140-mile-long (17.928 km) state highway in McCormick and Abbeville counties in South Carolina, United States. The highway connects Mount Carmel with rural areas of McCormick and Abbeville counties.

== Route description ==
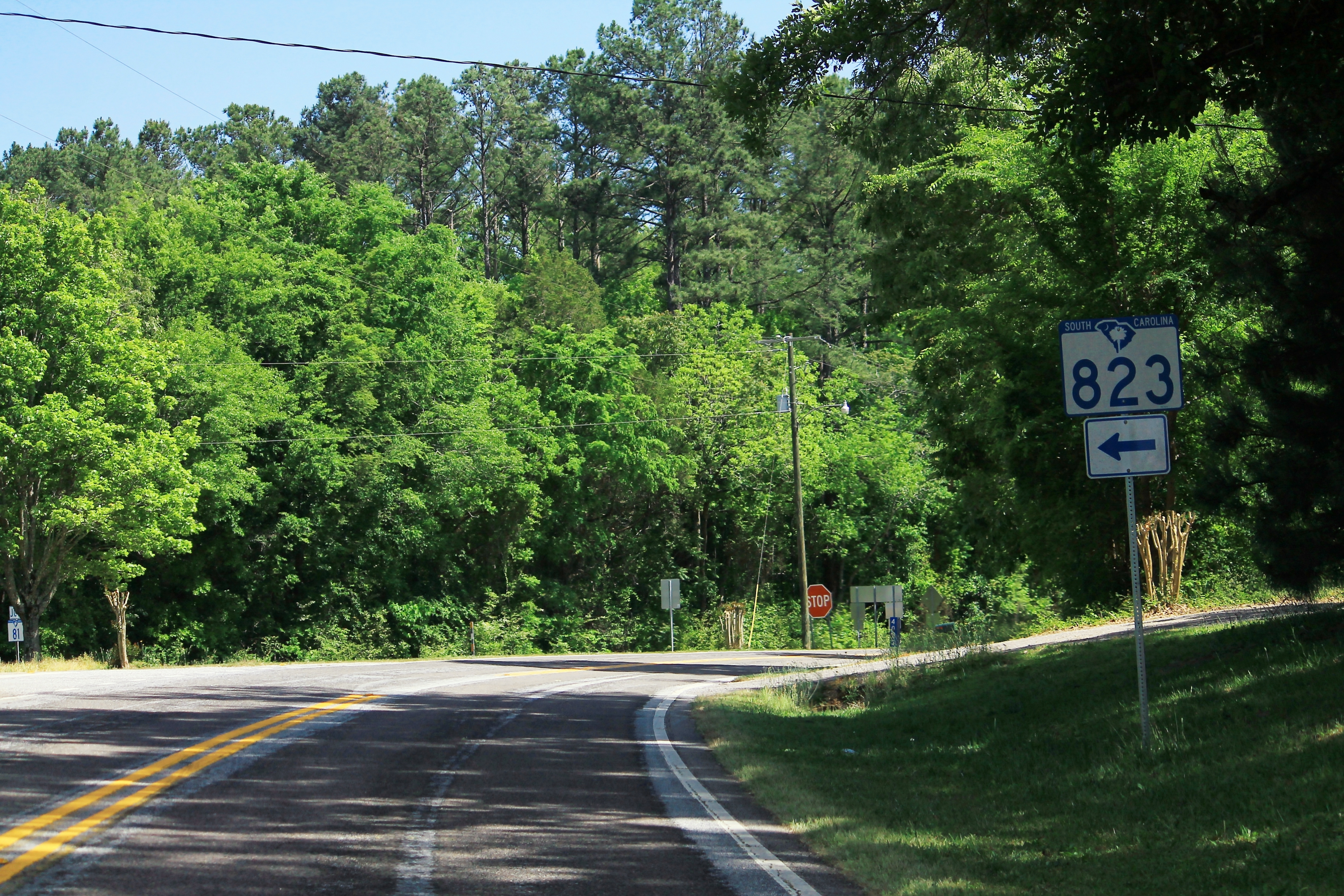
A sign denoting South Carolina Highway 823, located in Mount Carmel, May 2018

SC 823 begins at an intersection with SC 81 (Main Street) in Mount Carmel, within McCormick County. It travels to the north-northeast and immediately curves to the northeast along the western edge of Sumter National Forest. It crosses over Lott Creek, and then curves to the east-southeast and leaves Mount Carmel and enters the forest proper for a very short distance. It immediately crosses over the Little River. When it curves to the northeast, it again travels along the western edge of the forest. The highway curves to the north and crosses Hartzog Branch. It heads to the northeast again for a short time and enters Abbeville County. Right after the county line, SC 823 crosses over Bowie Branch and White Creek. It heads to the north-northeast and curves to the northeast. It passes Lebanon Cemetery. It then meets its northern terminus, an intersection with SC 72 at a point southwest of Abbeville.

== Major intersections ==
County	Location	mi	km	Destinations	Notes
McCormick	Mount Carmel	0.000	0.000	SC 81 (Main Street) – McCormick, Calhoun Falls	Southern terminus
Abbeville		11.140	17.928	SC 72 – Calhoun Falls, Abbeville	Northern terminus
1.000 mi = 1.609 km; 1.000 km = 0.621 mi
