= South Carolina Highway 188 =

State highway in South Carolina, United States

South Carolina Highway 188
- Keowee School Road

Route information
- Maintained by SCDOT
- Length: 8.250 mi (13.277 km)

Major junctions
- South end: SC 28 near Seneca
- North end: SC 183 near Walhalla

Location
- Country: United States
- State: South Carolina
- Counties: Oconee

Highway system
- South Carolina State Highway System; Interstate; US; State; Scenic
← SC 187	→ SC 191

South Carolina Highway 188 (SC 188) is a 8.250-mile (13.277 km) state highway in the U.S. state of South Carolina. The highway travels through rural areas of Oconee County. It is known as Keowee School Road for its entire length.

== Route description ==
SC 188 begins at an intersection with SC 28 (Blue Ridge Boulevard) northwest of Seneca, within Oconee County, where the roadway continues as Bountyland Road. It travels to the north-northwest and then curves to the northeast just before passing Oconee Christian Academy. It crosses over Cane Creek on the McMahan Bridge. Just south of White Harbor, it crosses over part of Lake Keowee on an unnamed bridge. North of White Harbor, it passes Keowee Elementary School. East-northeast of Walhalla, the highway meets its northern terminus, an intersection with SC 183.

== Major intersections ==
The entire route is in Oconee County.

Location	mi	km	Destinations	Notes
	0.000	0.000	SC 28 (Blue Ridge Boulevard) – Walhalla, Seneca	Southern terminus
	8.250	13.277	SC 183 – Walhalla, Pickens	Northern terminus
1.000 mi = 1.609 km; 1.000 km = 0.621 mi
