= Charley Creek =

Charley Creek may refer to:

- Charley Creek (Asotin Creek), a stream in Washington
- Charley Creek (Clallam River), a stream in Washington
- Charley Creek, Western Australia, a locality in the Shire of Donnybrook–Balingup

== See also ==
- Charlie Creek (disambiguation)
