= 1900 United States presidential election in South Carolina =

- November 6, 1900

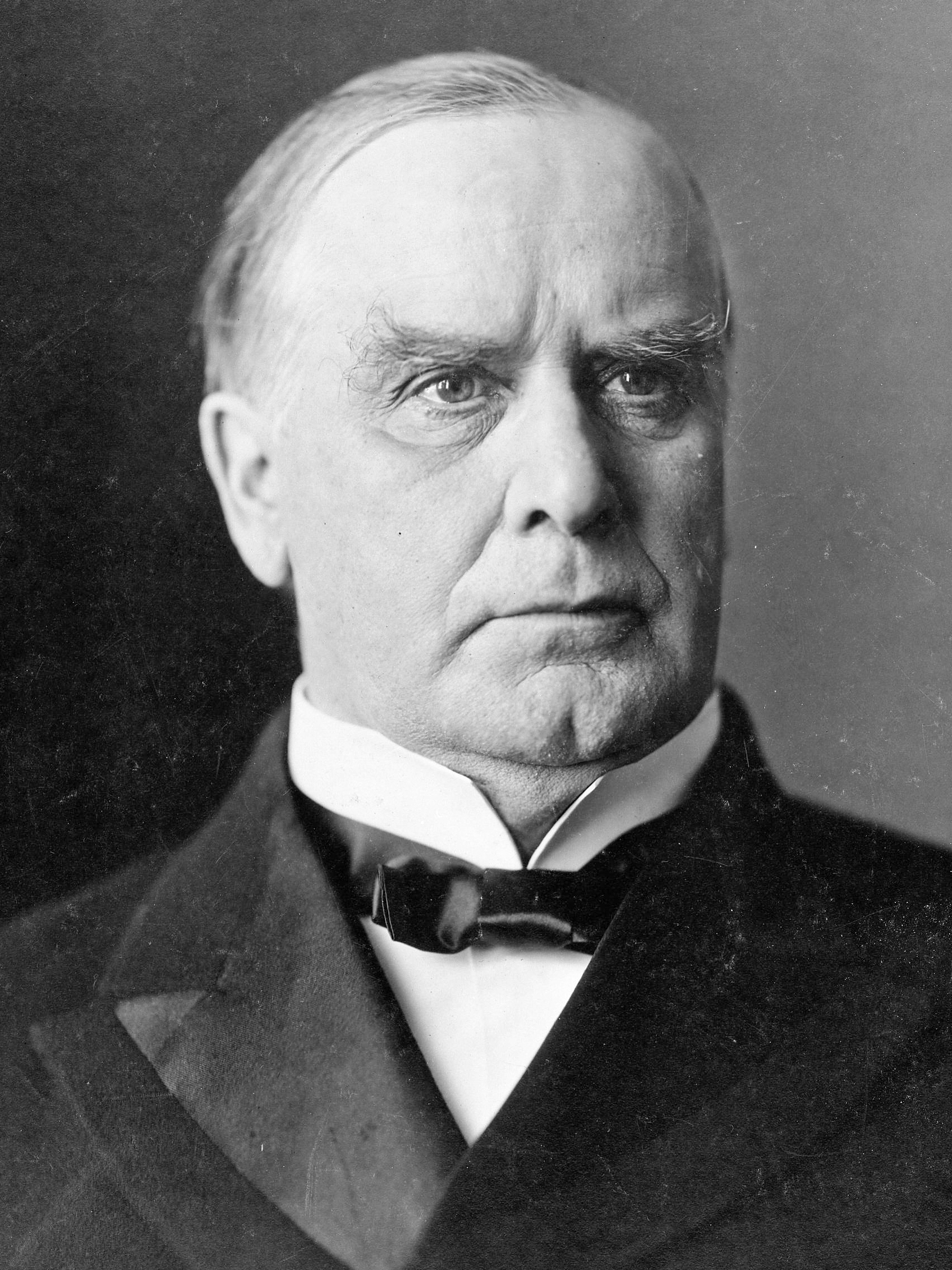
Nominee	William Jennings Bryan	William McKinley
Party	Democratic	Republican
Home state	Nebraska	Ohio
Running mate	Adlai Stevenson I	Theodore Roosevelt
Electoral vote	9	0
Popular vote	47,233	3,579
Percentage	92.96%	7.04%
County results
Bryan
70–80%
80–90%
90–100%
McKinley
50–60%
President before election
William McKinley
Republican
Elected President
William McKinley
Republican

The 1900 United States presidential election in South Carolina took place on November 6, 1900, as part of the 1900 United States presidential election. Voters chose nine representatives, or electors, to the Electoral College, who voted for the President and Vice President.

South Carolina overwhelmingly voted for the Democratic nominee, former U.S. Representative and 1896 Democratic presidential nominee William Jennings Bryan, over the Republican nominee, President William McKinley. Bryan won South Carolina by a landslide margin of 85.92% in this rematch of the 1896 presidential election. Despite McKinley's decisive victory nationwide as a result of the return of economic prosperity and recent victory in the Spanish–American War, South Carolina proved to be his weakest state as well as Bryan's strongest state, due to the nearly complete disfranchisement of the black majority that was the party's sole support in the state.

This would be the last election when the Republican Party won any county in South Carolina until Dwight D. Eisenhower in 1952, and the last when any county voted against the Democrats until Dixiecrat Strom Thurmond carried every county except Anderson and Spartanburg in 1948.

Bryan had previously won South Carolina against McKinley four years earlier and would later win the state again in 1908 against William Howard Taft.

Additionally, between 1900 and 1940, South Carolina gave at least 90% of the vote to the Democratic candidate, the longest streak for any state, even including D.C.

== Results ==
1900 United States presidential election in South Carolina
Party	Candidate	Running mate	Popular vote		Electoral vote	
Party	Candidate	Running mate	Count	%	Count	%
Democratic	William Jennings Bryan of Nebraska	Adlai Ewing Stevenson I of Illinois	47,233	92.96%	9	100.00%
Republican	William McKinley of Ohio (incumbent)	Theodore Roosevelt of New York	3,579	7.04%	0	0.00%
Total			50,812	100.00%	9	100.00%

=== Results by county ===
County	William Jennings Bryan Democratic		William McKinley Republican		Margin		Total votes cast
County	#	%	#	%	#	%	Total votes cast
Abbeville	1,366	99.42%	8	0.58%	1,358	98.84%	1,374
Aiken	1,470	96.52%	53	3.48%	1,417	93.04%	1,523
Anderson	1,858	96.47%	68	3.53%	1,790	92.94%	1,926
Bamberg	793	95.66%	36	4.34%	757	91.31%	829
Barnwell	1,356	95.97%	57	4.03%	1,299	91.93%	1,413
Beaufort	378	49.54%	385	50.46%	-7	-0.92%	763
Berkeley	472	80.82%	112	19.18%	360	61.64%	584
Charleston	1,729	86.45%	271	13.55%	1,458	72.90%	2,000
Cherokee	1,084	96.53%	39	3.47%	1,045	93.05%	1,123
Chester	836	97.66%	20	2.34%	816	95.33%	856
Chesterfield	1,314	95.91%	56	4.09%	1,258	91.82%	1,370
Clarendon	1,130	93.16%	83	6.84%	1,047	86.31%	1,213
Colleton	889	88.02%	121	11.98%	768	76.04%	1,010
Darlington	1,230	93.68%	83	6.32%	1,147	87.36%	1,313
Dorchester	770	94.71%	43	5.29%	727	89.42%	813
Edgefield	919	98.18%	17	1.82%	902	96.37%	936
Fairfield	670	97.53%	17	2.47%	653	95.05%	687
Florence	1,290	94.57%	74	5.43%	1,216	89.15%	1,364
Georgetown	446	49.72%	451	50.28%	-5	-0.56%	897
Greenville	1,777	97.42%	47	2.58%	1,730	94.85%	1,824
Greenwood	1,482	99.73%	4	0.27%	1,478	99.46%	1,486
Hampton	936	99.89%	1	0.11%	935	99.79%	937
Horry	1,330	94.39%	79	5.61%	1,251	88.79%	1,409
Kershaw	910	95.49%	43	4.51%	867	90.98%	953
Lancaster	1,300	94.89%	70	5.11%	1,230	89.78%	1,370
Laurens	1,540	98.09%	30	1.91%	1,510	96.18%	1,570
Lexington	1,302	97.75%	30	2.25%	1,272	95.50%	1,332
Marion	1,296	91.59%	119	8.41%	1,177	83.18%	1,415
Marlboro	714	95.33%	35	4.67%	679	90.65%	749
Newberry	1,367	97.16%	40	2.84%	1,327	94.31%	1,407
Oconee	873	92.68%	69	7.32%	804	85.35%	942
Orangeburg	2,457	93.64%	167	6.36%	2,290	87.27%	2,624
Pickens	933	93.96%	60	6.04%	873	87.92%	993
Richland	445	87.77%	62	12.23%	383	75.54%	507
Saluda	1,269	99.45%	7	0.55%	1,262	98.90%	1,276
Spartanburg	2,467	96.07%	101	3.93%	2,366	92.13%	2,568
Sumter	1,199	88.88%	150	11.12%	1,049	77.76%	1,349
Union	1,182	92.85%	91	7.15%	1,091	85.70%	1,273
Williamsburg	1,256	79.54%	323	20.46%	933	59.09%	1,579
York	1,198	97.00%	37	3.00%	1,161	94.01%	1,235
Totals	47,233	92.99%	3,559	7.01%	43,674	85.99%	50,792

== See also ==
- United States presidential elections in South Carolina
