= Powdersville, South Carolina =

Powdersville
- CDP
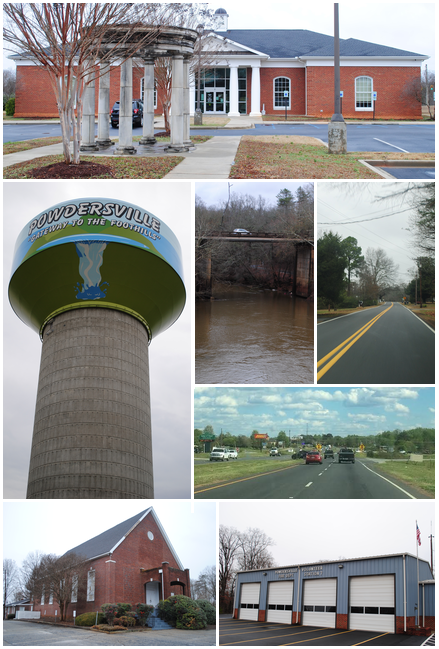
- Top, left to right: Powdersville Branch Library, water tower, Saluda River, Powdersville Main, Highway 153, Bethesda Church, Powdersville Volunteer Fire Department

- Location within the state of South Carolina
- Coordinates: 34°46′57″N 82°29′32″W
- Country: United States
- State: South Carolina
- County: Anderson

Area
  - Total: 13.88 sq mi (35.94 km^{2})
  - Land: 13.76 sq mi (35.63 km^{2})
  - Water: 0.12 sq mi (0.30 km^{2})
- Elevation: 942 ft (287 m)

Population (2020)
  - Total: 10,025
  - Density: 728.7/sq mi (281.34/km^{2})
- Time zone: UTC-5 (Eastern (EST))
  - Summer (DST): UTC-4 (EDT)
- FIPS code: 45-58165
- GNIS feature ID: 2403443

Powdersville is a census-designated place (CDP) in Anderson County, South Carolina. The population was 10,025 at the 2020 census,.

== History ==
The name Powders comes from the production and trade of gunpowder in the area. One of the first stores in present-day Powdersville was called the Powdersville Area General Store. In 1859 a powder mill was established in present-day Powdersville by John Bowen. During the American Civil War, the area was used to store gunpowder though Columbia remained the primary production site of the state's powder. Due to the area's use of gunpowder, the name Powders became a fixture for the location. The Saluda Valley-Powdersville Water Company was created in 1971 to serve drinking water to around 1,200 customers. In 1992, the name changed to Powdersville Water Company and in 2001 the name changed again to Powdersville Water District. The first high school in Powdersville was established in 2011 as Powdersville High School.

== Geography ==
Powdersville is located in the northern corner of Anderson County. Its northwest border is the Pickens County line, and its northeast border is the Saluda River, which forms the Greenville County line. The southeast border of the CDP is formed by Interstate 85, a six-lane highway with access to Powdersville via exits 39 and 40. Greenville, the largest city in the region, is 8 miles (13 km) to the northeast.

According to the United States Census Bureau, the CDP has a total area of 14.0 square miles (36.3 km^{2}), of which 13.9 square miles (35.9 km^{2}) is land and 0.12 square miles (0.3 km^{2}), or 0.90%, is water.

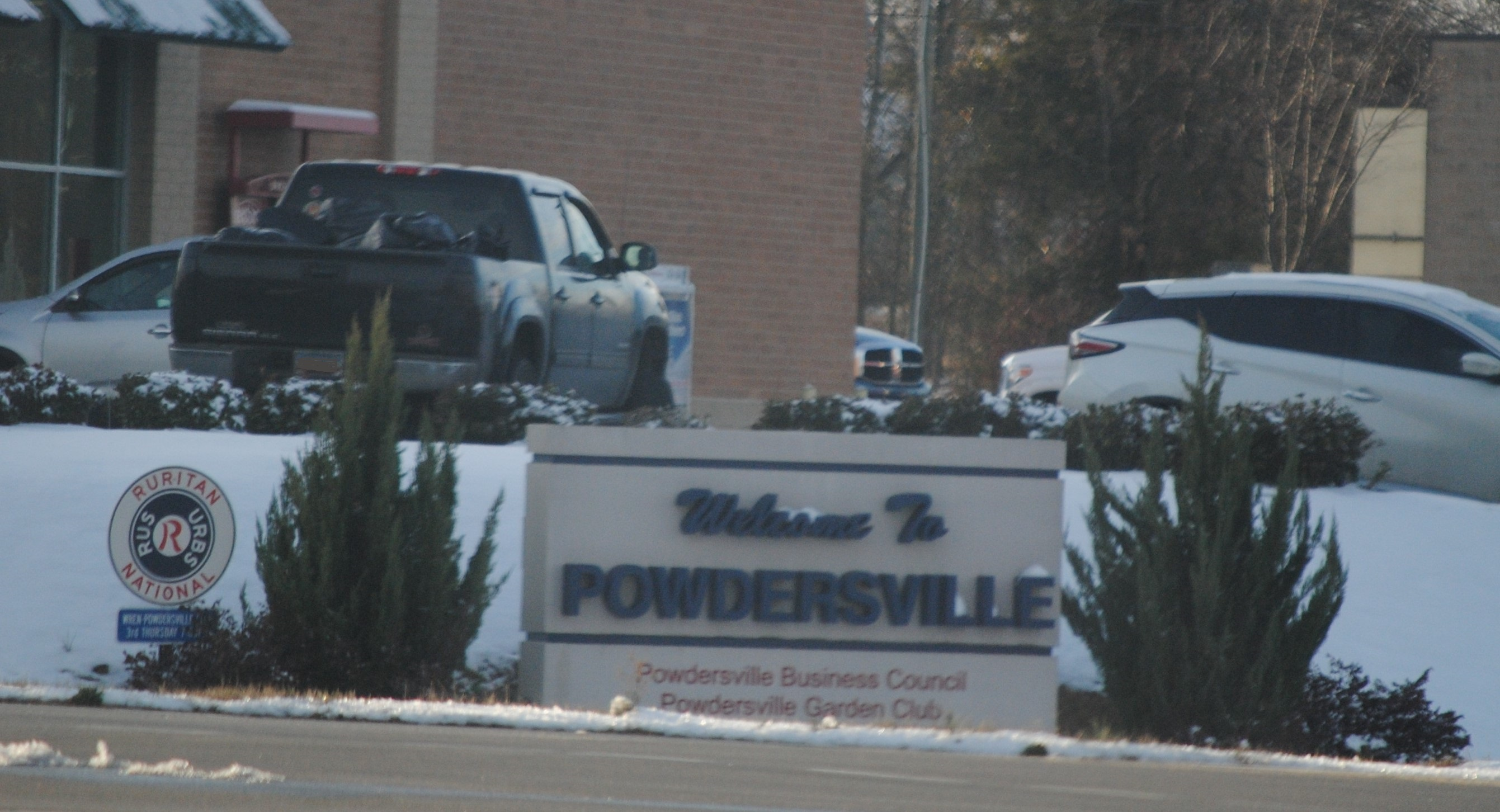
Powdersville town sign

== Demographics ==
Historical population
Census	Pop.	Note	%±
2000	5,362		—
2010	7,618		42.1%
2020	10,025		31.6%
U.S. Decennial Census

=== 2020 census ===
As of the 2020 census, Powdersville had a population of 10,025. The median age was 37.6 years. 24.8% of residents were under the age of 18 and 15.1% of residents were 65 years of age or older. For every 100 females there were 96.5 males, and for every 100 females age 18 and over there were 96.2 males age 18 and over.

98.8% of residents lived in urban areas, while 1.2% lived in rural areas.

There were 3,710 households in Powdersville, of which 36.9% had children under the age of 18 living in them. Of all households, 58.6% were married-couple households, 14.7% were households with a male householder and no spouse or partner present, and 20.9% were households with a female householder and no spouse or partner present. About 20.1% of all households were made up of individuals and 7.3% had someone living alone who was 65 years of age or older. There were 2,570 families residing in the CDP.

There were 4,247 housing units, of which 12.6% were vacant. The homeowner vacancy rate was 1.2% and the rental vacancy rate was 26.6%.

Powdersville racial composition
Race	Num.	Perc.
White (non-Hispanic)	7,515	74.96%
Black or African American (non-Hispanic)	926	9.24%
Native American	14	0.14%
Asian	508	5.07%
Pacific Islander	6	0.06%
Other/Mixed	406	4.05%
Hispanic or Latino	650	6.48%

=== 2000 census ===
As of the census of 2000, there were 5,362 people, 1,989 households, and 1,615 families residing in the CDP. The population density was 384.4 inhabitants per square mile (148.4/km^{2}). There were 2,133 housing units at an average density of 152.9 per square mile (59.0/km^{2}). The racial makeup of the CDP was 94.18% White, 4.35% African American, 0.26% Native American, 0.37% Asian, 0.06% Pacific Islander, 0.21% from other races, and 0.58% from two or more races. Hispanic or Latino of any race were 1.14% of the population.

There were 1,989 households, out of which 37.4% had children under the age of 18 living with them, 69.8% were married couples living together, 8.2% had a female householder with no husband present, and 18.8% were non-families. 16.9% of all households were made up of individuals, and 5.6% had someone living alone who was 65 years of age or older. The average household size was 2.70 and the average family size was 3.01.

In the CDP, the population was spread out, with 26.0% under the age of 18, 7.0% from 18 to 24, 30.4% from 25 to 44, 27.2% from 45 to 64, and 9.4% who were 65 years of age or older. The median age was 38 years. For every 100 females, there were 95.8 males. For every 100 females age 18 and over, there were 96.1 males.

The median income for a household in the CDP was $50,255, and the median income for a family was $57,131. Males had a median income of $41,297 versus $25,136 for females. The per capita income for the CDP was $20,901. About 2.4% of families and 2.5% of the population were below the poverty line, including 1.1% of those under age 18 and 7.3% of those age 65 or over.

== Religion ==
The largest religious group in Powdersville is Protestant. The oldest church congregation in Powdersville dating back to 1833 is Bethesda Church.

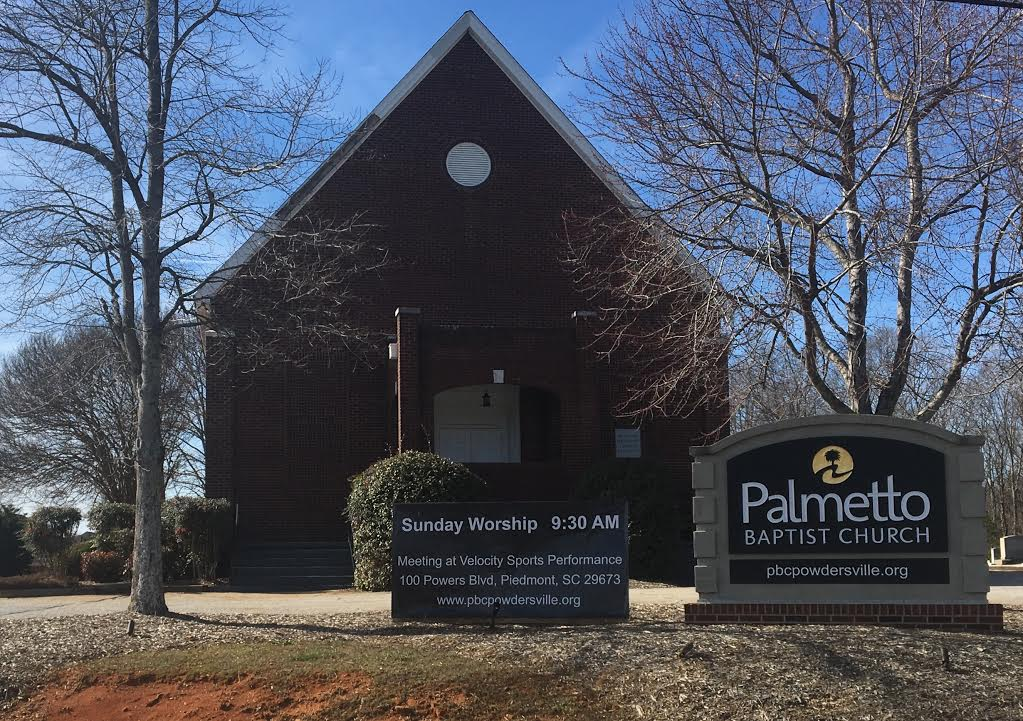
Palmetto Baptist Church

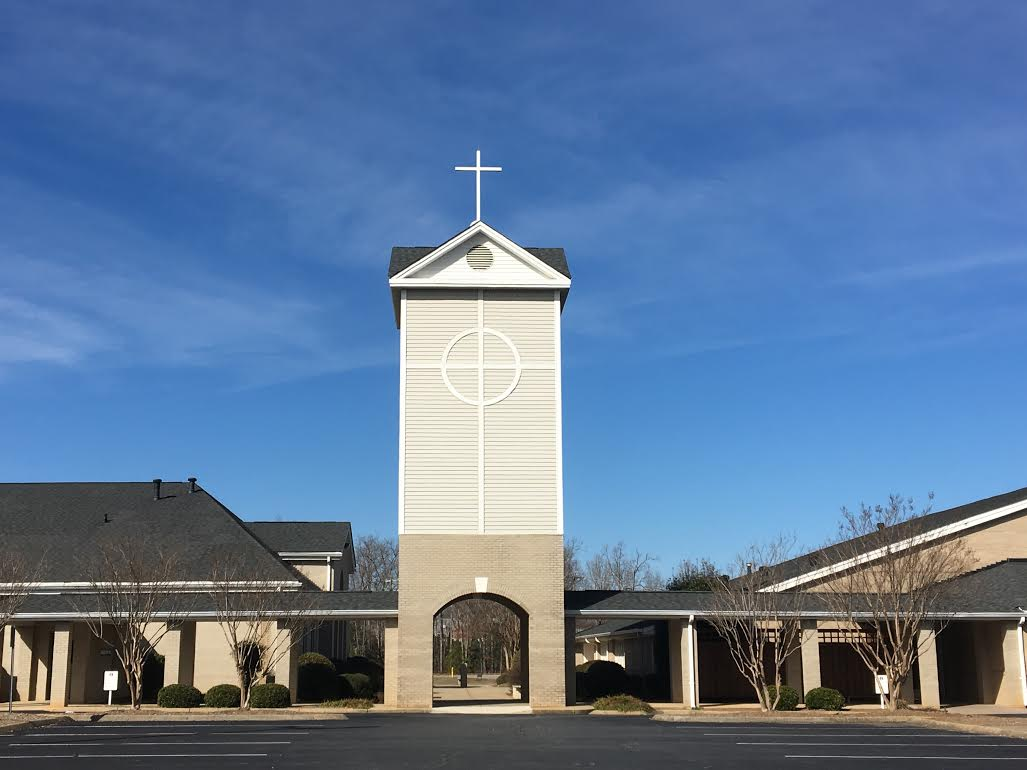
Bethesda United Methodist Church

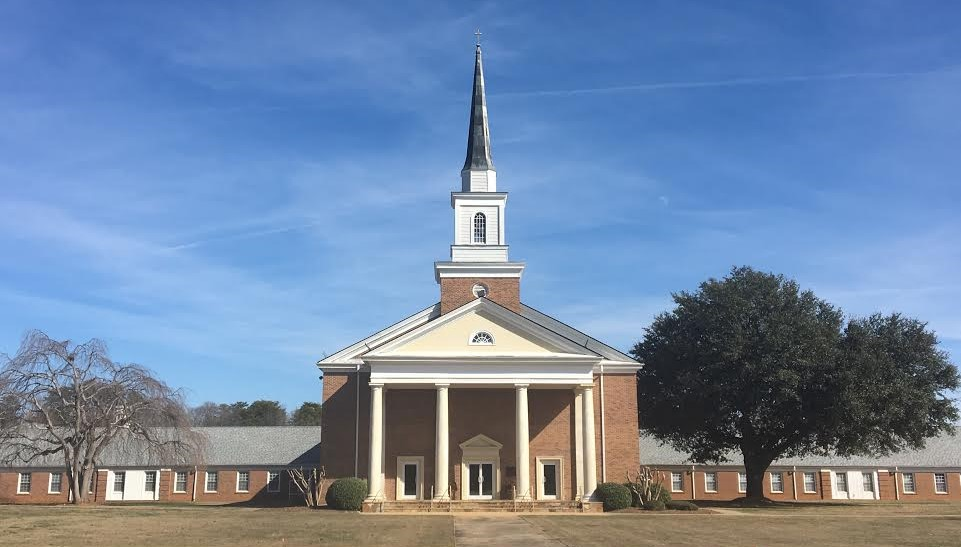
Siloam Baptist Church

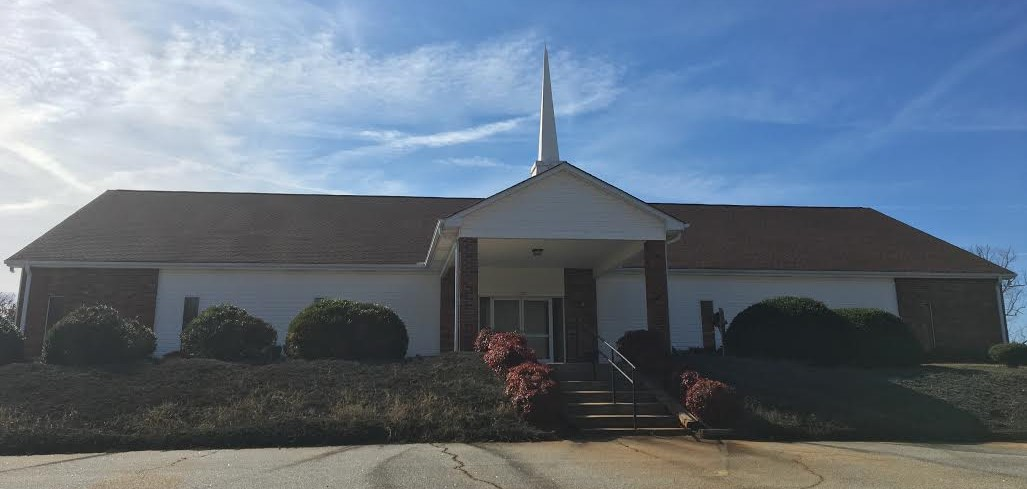
Lifespring Church of God

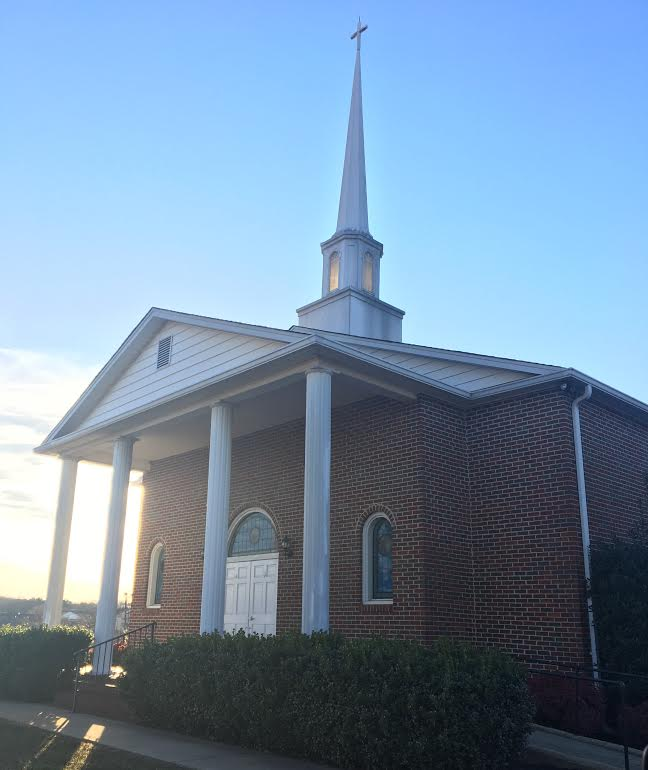
The Carpenters House

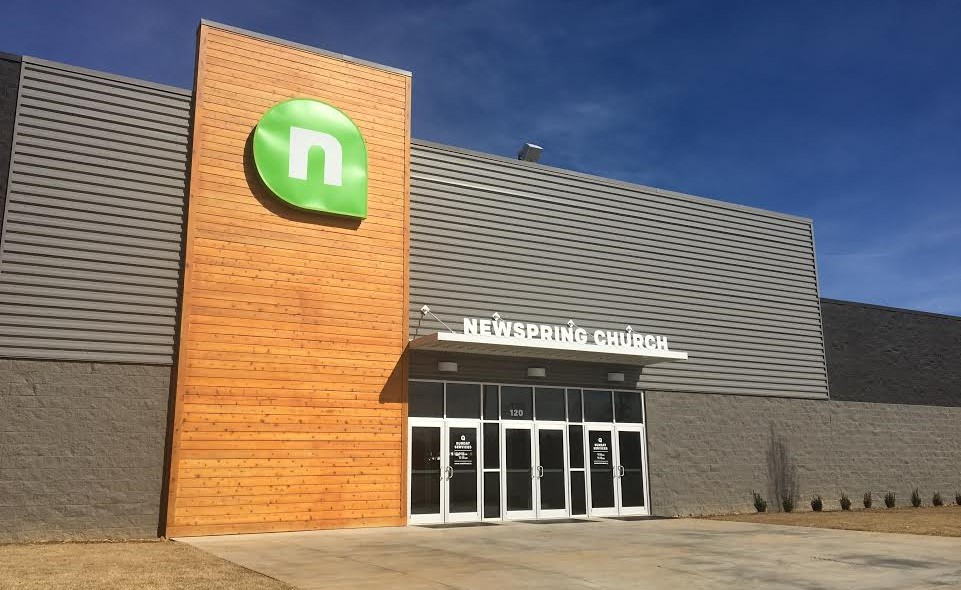
NewSpring Church Powdersville

== Education ==
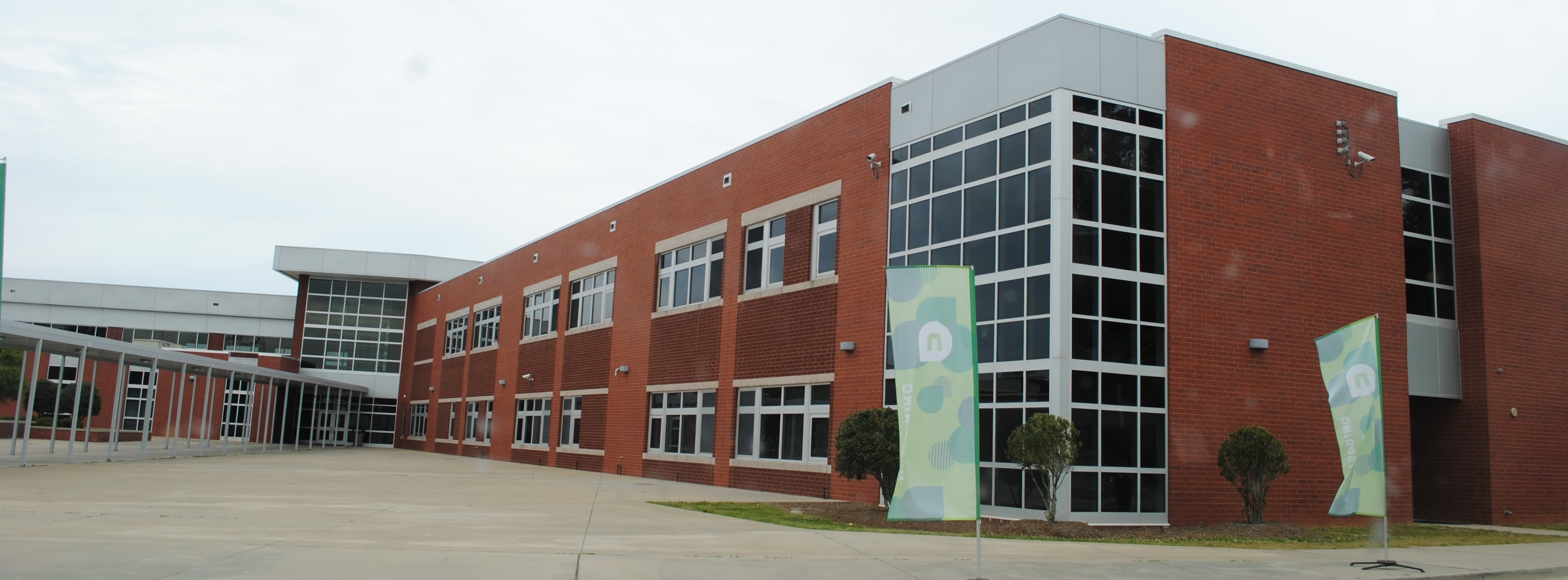
Powdersville High School

Public education in Powdersville is administered by Anderson County School District One. The district operates Concrete Primary School, Powdersville Elementary School, Powdersville Middle School and Powdersville High School.

Powdersville has a public library, a branch of the Anderson County Library System.

== Transportation ==
=== State Highways ===
- SC 153
- SC 81

=== Interstate ===
- I-85
