= 1896 United States presidential election in South Carolina =

- November 3, 1896

| Nominee | William Jennings Bryan | William McKinley |
| Party | Democratic | Republican |
| Home state | Nebraska | Ohio |
| Running mate | Arthur Sewall | Garret Hobart |
| Electoral vote | 9 | 0 |
| Popular vote | 58,801 | 9,313 |
| Percentage | 85.30% | 13.51% |
County results
Bryan
40–50%
60–70%
70–80%
80–90%
90–100%
McKinley
50–60%
60–70%
President before election
Grover Cleveland
Democratic
Elected President
William McKinley
Republican

The 1896 United States presidential election in South Carolina took place on November 3, 1896, as part of the 1896 United States presidential election. Voters chose nine representatives, or electors to the Electoral College, who voted for president and vice president.

South Carolina overwhelmingly voted for the Democratic nominee, former U.S. Representative from Nebraska William Jennings Bryan, over the Republican nominee, former governor of Ohio William McKinley. Bryan won the state by a landslide margin of 71.79%. However, McKinley's performance would actually prove to be a high water mark for Republicans going into the 20th century; he was the last Republican to win even 10% of the state's vote until Dwight D. Eisenhower in 1952.

With 85.3% of the popular vote, South Carolina would prove to be Bryan's second strongest state in the 1896 presidential election only after Mississippi. This election marked the end of Reconstruction in South Carolina, following the 1895 state constitutional convention that disenfranchised African Americans in South Carolina. The multiple-ballot box law was challenged in court. On May 8, 1895, Judge Nathan Goff of the United States Circuit Court declared the provision unconstitutional and enjoined the state from taking further action under it. But in June 1895, the US Fourth Circuit Court of Appeals reversed Goff and dissolved the injunction, leaving the way open for a convention.

The constitutional convention met on September 10 and adjourned on December 4, 1895. By the new constitution, South Carolina adopted the Mississippi Plan until January 1, 1898. Any male citizen could be registered who was able to read a section of the constitution or to satisfy the election officer that he understood it when read to him. Those thus registered were to remain voters for life. Under the new constitution and application of literacy practices, black voters were dropped in great numbers from the registration rolls: by 1896, in a state where according to the 1890 census blacks numbered 728,934 and comprised nearly sixty percent of the total population, only 5,500 black voters had succeeded in registering.

Bryan would later defeat McKinley in South Carolina again four years later and would win the state again in 1908 against William Howard Taft.

== Results ==
1896 United States presidential election in South Carolina
| Party | Candidate | Running mate | Popular vote | | Electoral vote | |
| Party | Candidate | Running mate | Count | % | Count | % |
|---|---|---|---|---|---|---|
| Democratic | William Jennings Bryan of Nebraska | Arthur Sewall of Maine | 58,801 | 85.30% | 9 | 100.00% |
| Republican | William McKinley of Ohio | Garret Hobart of New Jersey | 9,313 | 13.51% | 0 | 0.00% |
| National Democratic | John McAuley Palmer of Illinois | Simon Bolivar Buckner of Kentucky | 824 | 1.20% | 0 | 0.00% |
| Total | | | 68,938 | 100.00% | 9 | 100.00% |

=== Results by county ===
| County | William Jennings Bryan Democratic | | William McKinley Republican | | John McAuley Palmer National Democratic | | Margin | | Total votes cast |
| County | # | % | # | % | # | % | # | % | Total votes cast |
|---|---|---|---|---|---|---|---|---|---|
| Abbeville | 2,473 | 87.98% | 337 | 11.99% | 1 | 0.04% | 2,136 | 75.99% | 2,811 |
| Aiken | 1,819 | 92.48% | 137 | 6.96% | 11 | 0.56% | 1,682 | 85.51% | 1,967 |
| Anderson | 3,109 | 88.98% | 368 | 10.53% | 17 | 0.49% | 2,741 | 78.45% | 3,494 |
| Barnwell | 2,385 | 90.79% | 239 | 9.10% | 3 | 0.11% | 2,146 | 81.69% | 2,627 |
| Beaufort | 289 | 39.43% | 444 | 60.57% | 0 | 0.00% | −155 | −21.15% | 733 |
| Berkeley | 513 | 72.77% | 183 | 25.96% | 9 | 1.28% | 330 | 46.81% | 705 |
| Charleston | 1,660 | 47.82% | 1,262 | 36.36% | 549 | 15.82% | 398 | 11.47% | 3,471 |
| Chester | 1,254 | 93.58% | 76 | 5.67% | 10 | 0.75% | 1,178 | 87.91% | 1,340 |
| Chesterfield | 1,465 | 86.94% | 220 | 13.06% | 0 | 0.00% | 1,245 | 73.89% | 1,685 |
| Clarendon | 1,450 | 87.51% | 207 | 12.49% | 0 | 0.00% | 1,243 | 75.02% | 1,657 |
| Colleton | 1,646 | 82.51% | 343 | 17.19% | 6 | 0.30% | 1,303 | 65.31% | 1,995 |
| Darlington | 1,625 | 87.98% | 201 | 10.88% | 21 | 1.14% | 1,424 | 77.10% | 1,847 |
| Edgefield | 1,532 | 87.29% | 216 | 12.31% | 7 | 0.40% | 1,316 | 74.99% | 1,755 |
| Fairfield | 1,078 | 95.23% | 54 | 4.77% | 0 | 0.00% | 1,024 | 90.46% | 1,132 |
| Florence | 1,530 | 89.95% | 136 | 8.00% | 35 | 2.06% | 1,394 | 81.95% | 1,701 |
| Georgetown | 459 | 37.35% | 734 | 59.72% | 36 | 2.93% | −275 | −22.38% | 1,229 |
| Greenville | 2,718 | 89.38% | 288 | 9.47% | 35 | 1.15% | 2,430 | 79.91% | 3,041 |
| Hampton | 1,072 | 97.72% | 25 | 2.28% | 0 | 0.00% | 1,047 | 95.44% | 1,097 |
| Horry | 1,372 | 87.50% | 196 | 12.50% | 0 | 0.00% | 1,176 | 75.00% | 1,568 |
| Kershaw | 1,191 | 89.41% | 139 | 10.44% | 2 | 0.15% | 1,052 | 78.98% | 1,332 |
| Lancaster | 1,557 | 89.79% | 177 | 10.21% | 0 | 0.00% | 1,380 | 79.58% | 1,734 |
| Laurens | 1,943 | 94.60% | 111 | 5.40% | 0 | 0.00% | 1,832 | 89.19% | 2,054 |
| Lexington | 1,672 | 89.46% | 197 | 10.54% | 0 | 0.00% | 1,475 | 78.92% | 1,869 |
| Marion | 1,936 | 85.66% | 313 | 13.85% | 11 | 0.49% | 1,623 | 71.81% | 2,260 |
| Marlboro | 1,232 | 83.70% | 237 | 16.10% | 3 | 0.20% | 995 | 67.60% | 1,472 |
| Newberry | 1,525 | 95.43% | 64 | 4.01% | 9 | 0.56% | 1,461 | 91.43% | 1,598 |
| Oconee | 1,392 | 87.49% | 199 | 12.51% | 0 | 0.00% | 1,193 | 74.98% | 1,591 |
| Orangeburg | 2,729 | 90.63% | 282 | 9.37% | 0 | 0.00% | 2,447 | 81.27% | 3,011 |
| Pickens | 1,261 | 88.12% | 170 | 11.88% | 0 | 0.00% | 1,091 | 76.24% | 1,431 |
| Richland | 925 | 65.05% | 468 | 32.91% | 29 | 2.04% | 457 | 32.14% | 1,422 |
| Saluda | 1,241 | 95.39% | 60 | 4.61% | 0 | 0.00% | 1,181 | 90.78% | 1,301 |
| Spartanburg | 4,234 | 94.49% | 247 | 5.51% | 0 | 0.00% | 3,987 | 88.98% | 4,481 |
| Sumter | 1,550 | 81.58% | 326 | 17.16% | 24 | 1.26% | 1,224 | 64.42% | 1,900 |
| Union | 1,379 | 89.60% | 158 | 10.27% | 2 | 0.13% | 1,221 | 79.34% | 1,539 |
| Williamsburg | 1,570 | 81.73% | 347 | 18.06% | 4 | 0.21% | 1,223 | 63.66% | 1,921 |
| York | 2,013 | 92.81% | 152 | 7.01% | 4 | 0.18% | 1,861 | 85.80% | 2,169 |
| Totals | 58,799 | 87.70% | 9,313 | 13.51% | 824 | 1.23% | 49,486 | 71.78% | 68,940 |

== See also ==
- United States presidential elections in South Carolina
