= Homeland Park, South Carolina =

Homeland Park
- CDP
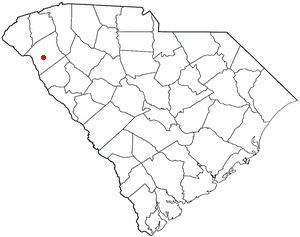
- Location of Homeland Park, South Carolina
- Coordinates: 34°27′52″N 82°39′33″W
- Country: United States
- State: South Carolina
- County: Anderson

Area
  - Total: 4.72 sq mi (12.22 km^{2})
  - Land: 4.71 sq mi (12.20 km^{2})
  - Water: 0.012 sq mi (0.03 km^{2})
- Elevation: 817 ft (249 m)

Population (2020)
  - Total: 6,445
  - Density: 1,368.7/sq mi (528.46/km^{2})
- Time zone: UTC-5 (Eastern (EST))
  - Summer (DST): UTC-4 (EDT)
- FIPS code: 45-34720
- GNIS feature ID: 2402596

Homeland Park is a census-designated place (CDP) in Anderson County, South Carolina. The population was 6,445 at the 2020 census.

== Geography ==
Homeland Park is a suburban area in central Anderson County south of the city of Anderson, the county seat. South Carolina Highway 81 (S. Murray Avenue) is the main north–south road through the community. U.S. Route 29 leads southwest out of Homeland Park, reaching the Georgia border in 14 miles (23 km).

According to the United States Census Bureau, the CDP has a total area of 4.7 square miles (12.2 km^{2}), all land.

== Demographics ==
Historical population
Census	Pop.	Note	%±
2010	6,296		—
2020	6,445		2.4%
U.S. Decennial Census

=== 2020 census ===
Homeland Park racial composition
Race	Num.	Perc.
White (non-Hispanic)	3,430	53.22%
Black or African American (non-Hispanic)	1,904	29.54%
Native American	8	0.12%
Asian	20	0.31%
Pacific Islander	7	0.11%
Other/Mixed	340	5.28%
Hispanic or Latino	736	11.42%

As of the 2020 United States census, there were 6,445 people, 2,630 households, and 1,643 families residing in the CDP.

=== 2000 census ===
As of the census of 2000, there were 6,337 people, 2,685 households, and 1,772 families residing in the CDP. The population density was 1,328.9 inhabitants per square mile (513.1/km^{2}). There were 2,985 housing units at an average density of 626.0 per square mile (241.7/km^{2}). The racial makeup of the CDP was 76.85% White, 20.89% African American, 0.21% Native American, 0.28% Asian, 0.88% from other races, and 0.88% from two or more races. Hispanic or Latino of any race were 1.47% of the population.

There were 2,685 households, out of which 29.8% had children under the age of 18 living with them, 41.2% were married couples living together, 18.8% had a female householder with no husband present, and 34.0% were non-families. 29.5% of all households were made up of individuals, and 12.0% had someone living alone who was 65 years of age or older. The average household size was 2.36 and the average family size was 2.88.

In the CDP, the population was spread out, with 24.8% under the age of 18, 9.6% from 18 to 24, 27.5% from 25 to 44, 22.3% from 45 to 64, and 15.8% who were 65 years of age or older. The median age was 36 years. For every 100 females, there were 89.1 males. For every 100 females age 18 and over, there were 85.7 males.

The median income for a household in the CDP was $25,008, and the median income for a family was $30,878. Males had a median income of $26,959 versus $18,635 for females. The per capita income for the CDP was $12,787. About 13.3% of families and 59.0% of the population were below the poverty line, including 19.0% of those under age 18 and 16.5% of those age 65 or over.
