= Sadlers Creek State Park =

State park in South Carolina, United States

- Interactive map of Sadlers Creek State Park
- Nearest city: Anderson, SC
- Coordinates: 34°25′23″N 82°49′28″W
- Area: 395 acres (2 km^{2})
- Camp sites: tent and RV sites, primitive group area
- Hiking trails: 1/2 mile Pine Grove Trail

Sadlers Creek State Park is a state park located near the town of Anderson in Anderson County, South Carolina. The park is on a peninsula which extends into Lake Hartwell.

Activities available at the park include picnicking, fishing, hiking, boating, swimming, biking, bird watching and geocaching.

Amenities include picnic shelters, a boat ramp, two playgrounds, a 5.4 mile long loop bike trail and a lakeside Pavilion available for large gatherings.
