= Williamston, South Carolina =

Williamston
- Town
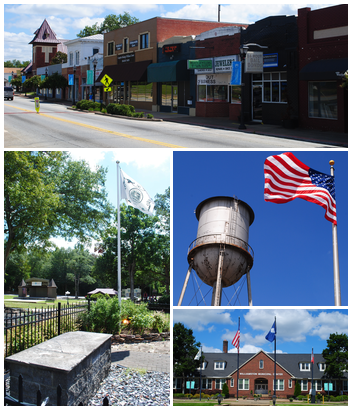
- Top, left to right: Downtown Williamston, the grave of West Allen Williams (founder of Williamston) in Williamston Springs Mineral Park, water tower at the Williamston Mill, Williamston Municipal Center

- Flag Seal

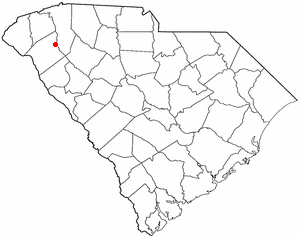
- Location of Williamston, South Carolina
- Coordinates: 34°37′24″N 82°29′50″W
- Country: United States
- State: South Carolina
- County: Anderson

Area
  - Total: 3.73 sq mi (9.65 km^{2})
  - Land: 3.69 sq mi (9.55 km^{2})
  - Water: 0.035 sq mi (0.09 km^{2})
- Elevation: 804 ft (245 m)

Population (2020)
  - Total: 4,043
  - Density: 1,096/sq mi (423.2/km^{2})
- Time zone: UTC−5 (Eastern (EST))
  - Summer (DST): UTC−4 (EDT)
- ZIP code: 29697
- Area codes: 864, 821
- FIPS code: 45-77875
- GNIS feature ID: 2406888
- Website: www.williamstonsc.us

Williamston is a town in Anderson County, South Carolina. The population was 4,043 at the 2020 census.

== Geography ==
Williamston is located in northeastern Anderson County. The twin towns of Pelzer and West Pelzer are 2 miles (3 km) to the north. Anderson, the county seat, is 15 miles (24 km) to the southwest.

According to the United States Census Bureau, the town has a total area of 3.7 square miles (9.5 km^{2}), of which 3.6 square miles (9.4 km^{2}) is land and 0.04 square miles (0.1 km^{2}), or 1.01%, is water.

== Demographics ==
Historical population
Census	Pop.	Note	%±
1890	935		—
1900	991		6.0%
1910	1,957		97.5%
1920	2,322		18.7%
1930	2,235		−3.7%
1940	2,509		12.3%
1950	2,782		10.9%
1960	3,721		33.8%
1970	3,991		7.3%
1980	4,310		8.0%
1990	3,876		−10.1%
2000	3,791		−2.2%
2010	3,934		3.8%
2020	4,043		2.8%
2022 (est.)	4,148	▲	2.6%
U.S. Decennial Census

=== 2020 census ===
As of the 2020 census, Williamston had a population of 4,043. The median age was 38.7 years. 23.2% of residents were under the age of 18 and 17.1% of residents were 65 years of age or older. For every 100 females, there were 86.1 males, and for every 100 females age 18 and over, there were 83.0 males age 18 and over.

99.5% of residents lived in urban areas, while 0.5% lived in rural areas.

There were 1,676 households in Williamston, including 1,092 families. Of all households, 32.0% had children under the age of 18 living in them, 38.5% were married-couple households, 18.4% were households with a male householder and no spouse or partner present, and 35.4% were households with a female householder and no spouse or partner present. About 30.7% of all households were made up of individuals, and 14.0% had someone living alone who was 65 years of age or older.

There were 1,846 housing units, of which 9.2% were vacant. The homeowner vacancy rate was 1.8% and the rental vacancy rate was 4.8%.

Williamston racial composition
Race	Num.	Perc.
White (non-Hispanic)	3,117	77.1%
Black or African American (non-Hispanic)	517	12.79%
Native American	23	0.57%
Asian	6	0.15%
Pacific Islander	1	0.02%
Other/Mixed	145	3.59%
Hispanic or Latino	234	5.79%

=== 2000 census ===
As of the census of 2000, there were 3,791 people, 1,590 households, and 1,090 families residing in the town. The population density was 1,056.2 inhabitants per square mile (407.8/km^{2}). There were 1,762 housing units at an average density of 490.9 units per square mile (189.5 units/km^{2}). The racial makeup of the town was 80.80% White, 17.67% African American, 0.08% Native American, 0.11% Asian, 0.66% from other races, and 0.69% from two or more races. Hispanic or Latino of any race were 1.74% of the population.

There were 1,590 households, out of which 27.6% had children under the age of 18 living with them, 49.9% were married couples living together, 14.0% had a female householder with no husband present, and 31.4% were non-families. 28.8% of all households were made up of individuals, and 14.7% had someone living alone who was 65 years of age or older. The average household size was 2.38 and the average family size was 2.91.

In the town, the population was spread out, with 22.8% under the age of 18, 7.4% from 18 to 24, 28.3% from 25 to 44, 22.7% from 45 to 64, and 18.9% who were 65 years of age or older. The median age was 40 years. For every 100 females, there were 91.7 males. For every 100 females age 18 and over, there were 86.7 males.

The median income for a household in the town was $31,458, and the median income for a family was $37,679. Males had a median income of $30,585 versus $21,771 for females. The per capita income for the town was $14,085. About 9.4% of families and 12.3% of the population were below the poverty line, including 10.3% of those under age 18 and 13.3% of those age 65 or over.

== Education ==
Public schools in the Pelzer/Williamston/West Pelzer area are administered by Anderson District One. The public elementary schools in Anderson district one are Cedar Grove Elementary, Powdersville Elementary, Concrete Primary, Spearman Elementary, Hunt Meadows Elementary, West Pelzer Elementary, Palmetto Elementary, and Wren Elementary. The Middle schools are Palmetto Middle, Wren Middle, and Powdersville Middle. High schools are; Palmetto High School, Palmetto High Freshman Academy, Powdersville High School, Wren High School, and Wren High School Freshman Academy.

Williamston has a public library, a branch of the Anderson County Library System.

== Emergency Services ==
- EMS - Emergency Medical Services - Paramedic level service is provided by Anderson County EMS, utilizing quick response vehicles (QRVs) which are equipped and staffed at the paramedic level. Basic life support (BLS) transport is provided by Medshore Ambulance Service through a contract with Anderson County.
- Fire - Fire/Rescue service is provided by the Williamston Fire Department. This is a primarily volunteer fire department, with a paid full-time fire chief. Mutual aid back-up is also provided to and from, the West Pelzer Fire Department, South Greenville Fire Department, Piedmont Fire Department, Wren Fire Department, Belton Fire Department, Cheddar Fire Department, and Whitefield Fire Department.
- Law Enforcement - The Williamston Police department provides services to the town. They are backed-up, when necessary, by the Anderson County Sheriff's Office and the West Pelzer Police Department. The department also provides mutual aid back-up to those agencies as requested.
