= 1908 United States presidential election in South Carolina =

- November 3, 1908
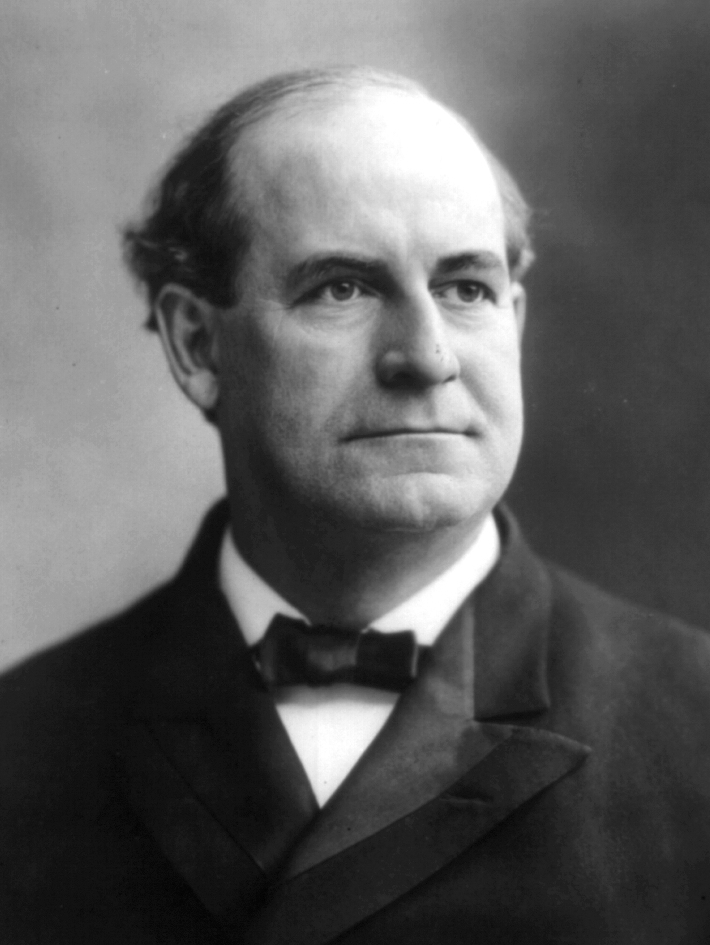

Nominee	William Jennings Bryan	William Howard Taft
Party	Democratic	Republican
Home state	Nebraska	Ohio
Running mate	John W. Kern	James S. Sherman
Electoral vote	9	0
Popular vote	62,288	3,945
Percentage	93.84%	5.94%
County results
Bryan
60–70%
70–80%
80–90%
90–100%
President before election
Theodore Roosevelt
Republican
Elected President
William Howard Taft
Republican

The 1908 United States presidential election in South Carolina took place on November 3, 1908, as part of the 1908 United States presidential election. Voters chose nine representatives, or electors to the Electoral College, who voted for president and vice president.

South Carolina overwhelmingly voted for the Democratic nominee, former U.S. Representative William Jennings Bryan, over the Republican nominee, Secretary of War William Howard Taft. Bryan won the state by a landslide margin of 87.9 points, even carrying Hampton County unanimously.

With 93.84% of the popular vote, South Carolina would be Bryan's strongest victory in terms of percentage in the popular vote. Although South Carolina was also Taft's weakest state, he had performed slightly better in the state than Theodore Roosevelt had four years prior.

Bryan had previously won the state twice against William McKinley in both 1896 and 1900.

== Results ==
1908 United States presidential election in South Carolina
Party	Candidate	Running mate	Popular vote		Electoral vote	
Party	Candidate	Running mate	Count	%	Count	%
Democratic	William Jennings Bryan of Nebraska	John Worth Kern of Indiana	62,288	93.84%	9	100.00%
Republican	William Howard Taft of Ohio	James Schoolcraft Sherman of New York	3,945	5.94%	0	0.00%
Socialist	Eugene Victor Debs of Indiana	Benjamin Hanford of New York	100	0.15%	0	0.00%
Independence	Thomas Louis Hisgen of Massachusetts	John Temple Graves of Georgia	46	0.07%	0	0.00%
Total			66,379	100.00%	9	100.00%

=== Results by county ===
County	William Jennings Bryan Democratic		William Howard Taft Republican		Eugene Victor Debs Socialist		Thomas Hisgen Independence		Margin		Total votes cast
County	#	%	#	%	#	%	#	%	#	%	Total votes cast
Abbeville	1,481	99.13%	9	0.60%	0	0.00%	4	0.27%	1,472	98.53%	1,494
Aiken	1,990	97.64%	48	2.36%	0	0.00%	0	0.00%	1,942	95.29%	2,038
Anderson	2,099	97.18%	58	2.69%	3	0.14%	0	0.00%	2,041	94.49%	2,160
Bamberg	848	96.25%	33	3.75%	0	0.00%	0	0.00%	815	92.51%	881
Barnwell	1,407	94.11%	88	5.89%	0	0.00%	0	0.00%	1,319	88.23%	1,495
Beaufort	522	65.74%	272	34.26%	0	0.00%	0	0.00%	250	31.49%	794
Berkeley	609	72.16%	235	27.84%	0	0.00%	0	0.00%	374	44.31%	844
Calhoun	669	92.28%	54	7.45%	0	0.00%	2	0.28%	615	84.83%	725
Charleston	1,814	82.68%	347	15.82%	26	1.19%	7	0.32%	1,467	66.86%	2,194
Cherokee	1,506	95.80%	66	4.20%	0	0.00%	0	0.00%	1,440	91.60%	1,572
Chester	1,368	97.37%	37	2.63%	0	0.00%	0	0.00%	1,331	94.73%	1,405
Chesterfield	1,458	96.88%	47	3.12%	0	0.00%	0	0.00%	1,411	93.75%	1,505
Clarendon	1,091	94.62%	62	5.38%	0	0.00%	0	0.00%	1,029	89.25%	1,153
Colleton	1,399	93.89%	91	6.11%	0	0.00%	0	0.00%	1,308	87.79%	1,490
Darlington	1,279	98.38%	21	1.62%	0	0.00%	0	0.00%	1,258	96.77%	1,300
Dorchester	883	89.10%	103	10.39%	0	0.00%	5	0.50%	780	78.71%	991
Edgefield	1,097	99.28%	8	0.72%	0	0.00%	0	0.00%	1,089	98.55%	1,105
Fairfield	830	98.34%	12	1.42%	0	0.00%	2	0.24%	818	96.92%	844
Florence	1,460	97.46%	28	1.87%	7	0.47%	3	0.20%	1,432	95.59%	1,498
Georgetown	544	83.31%	108	16.54%	0	0.00%	1	0.15%	436	66.77%	653
Greenville	2,774	92.93%	176	5.90%	28	0.94%	7	0.23%	2,598	87.04%	2,985
Greenwood	1,765	98.44%	18	1.00%	10	0.56%	0	0.00%	1,747	97.43%	1,793
Hampton	1,138	100.00%	0	0.00%	0	0.00%	0	0.00%	1,138	100.00%	1,138
Horry	1,247	95.70%	56	4.30%	0	0.00%	0	0.00%	1,191	91.40%	1,303
Kershaw	922	95.25%	45	4.65%	0	0.00%	1	0.10%	877	90.60%	968
Lancaster	1,730	96.65%	58	3.24%	0	0.00%	2	0.11%	1,672	93.41%	1,790
Laurens	2,160	97.21%	61	2.75%	1	0.05%	0	0.00%	2,099	94.46%	2,222
Lee	963	94.13%	58	5.67%	0	0.00%	2	0.20%	905	88.47%	1,023
Lexington	2,508	96.87%	80	3.09%	1	0.04%	0	0.00%	2,428	93.78%	2,589
Marion	2,007	95.66%	91	4.34%	0	0.00%	0	0.00%	1,916	91.33%	2,098
Marlboro	917	98.29%	16	1.71%	0	0.00%	0	0.00%	901	96.57%	933
Newberry	1,681	97.39%	44	2.55%	0	0.00%	1	0.06%	1,637	94.84%	1,726
Oconee	1,126	86.62%	172	13.23%	0	0.00%	2	0.15%	954	73.38%	1,300
Orangeburg	2,687	86.87%	405	13.09%	0	0.00%	1	0.03%	2,282	73.78%	3,093
Pickens	1,241	95.68%	56	4.32%	0	0.00%	0	0.00%	1,185	91.36%	1,297
Richland	1,750	87.19%	236	11.76%	18	0.90%	3	0.15%	1,514	75.44%	2,007
Saluda	1,385	99.28%	8	0.57%	1	0.07%	1	0.07%	1,377	98.71%	1,395
Spartanburg	4,162	94.76%	225	5.12%	5	0.11%	0	0.00%	3,937	89.64%	4,392
Sumter	1,228	87.15%	173	12.28%	0	0.00%	8	0.57%	1,055	74.88%	1,409
Union	1,389	96.59%	49	3.41%	0	0.00%	0	0.00%	1,340	93.18%	1,438
Williamsburg	1,550	89.60%	180	10.40%	0	0.00%	0	0.00%	1,370	79.19%	1,730
York	1,606	98.23%	29	1.77%	0	0.00%	0	0.00%	1,577	96.45%	1,635
Totals	62,290	93.80%	3,963	5.97%	100	0.15%	52	0.08%	58,327	87.84%	66,405

== See also ==
- United States presidential elections in South Carolina
