= Powdersville High School =

Powdersville High School | PVHS

Location
- 145 Hood Road; Powdersville, South Carolina; United States; 34.8012°N 82.4873°W

Information
- Type: Public high school
- Established: 2011 (15 years ago)
- Founder: Maddox Knight
- School district: Anderson County School District One
- CEEB code: 410913
- Principal: Maddox Knight
- Teaching staff: 54.00 (FTE)
- Grades: 9–12
- Gender: Co-educational
- Enrollment: 1,037 (2023–2024)
- Student to teacher ratio: 19.20
- Schedule: 4x4 block schedule
- Campus type: Suburban
- Colors: Red, white, and blue
- Athletics: Football, volleyball, tennis, cross country, track & field, basketball, baseball, softball, soccer, golf, cheer, dance, fishing, swim, and wrestling
- Mascot: The Patriot
- Nickname: Powdersville Patriots
- Newspaper: The Patriot Press
- Yearbook: The Revolution
- Website: www.anderson1.org/o/ph

Powdersville High School (PVHS) is a public high school in Powdersville, South Carolina, United States, a suburb of Greenville located in Anderson County. It is one of three high schools in Anderson School District One, and first opened in August 2011.

== History ==
Prior to the opening of PVHS, students who lived in the Powdersville area attended Wren High School. However, due to growth in the area, Anderson School District 1 voted in 2008 to build a high school for Powdersville. The school opened to students on August 16th, 2011 with 265 students in grades 9–10. In 2013–2014, PVHS enrollment was around 750 students in grades 9–12. In 2015–2016 school year, it enrolled around 840 students.

The school held its first graduation on May 30, 2014.

== Athletics ==
The marching band won a 1A state championship in 2012 and the 2A state championship in 2014 and 2016.

=== State championships ===
- Cross Country - Boys: 2016
- Volleyball: 2018, 2019, 2020
- Varsity Basketball- Boys: 2024
- Varsity Baseball: 2024
- Boys Soccer: 2025, 2026
