= Charlie Creek (South Dakota) =

Stream in South Dakota, U.S.

Coordinates: 44°51′40″N 100°44′11″W

Charlie Creek is a stream in the U.S. state of South Dakota.

A variant name was Fox Creek. Charlie Creek has the name of Charley Claymore, a Native American who settled there.

== See also ==
- List of rivers of South Dakota
