= Rocky River (South Carolina) =

Location
- Country: United States
- State: South Carolina
- Region: Anderson County; Abbeville County
- Municipality: Anderson; Calhoun Falls

Physical characteristics
- Source: Beaverdam Creek and Little Beaverdam Creek
  - location: Anderson County, South Carolina
  - coordinates: 34°34′13″N 82°33′02″W
- Mouth
  - location: near Calhoun Falls, Abbeville County, South Carolina
  - coordinates: 35°02′28″N 82°38′02″W

The Rocky River is a 50.3-mile-long (81.0 km) tributary of the Savannah River in the U.S. state of South Carolina. It flows into the Savannah River just west of Calhoun Falls at 34°05′28″N 82°38′25″W. It forms as the confluence of Beaverdam Creek and Little Beaverdam Creek northeast of Anderson at 34°34′13″N 82°33′02″W.
