= La France, South Carolina =

La France
- CDP
- Location within South Carolina Location within the United States
- Coordinates: 34°36′39″N 82°45′45″W
- Country: United States
- State: South Carolina
- County: Anderson

Area
  - Total: 1.31 sq mi (3.40 km^{2})
  - Land: 1.30 sq mi (3.36 km^{2})
  - Water: 0.015 sq mi (0.04 km^{2})
- Elevation: 768 ft (234 m)

Population (2020)
  - Total: 476
  - Density: 367.2/sq mi (141.78/km^{2})
- Time zone: UTC-5 (Eastern (EST))
  - Summer (DST): UTC-4 (EDT)
- ZIP code: 29656
- Area codes: 864, 821
- GNIS feature ID: 2812929

La France is an unincorporated community and census-designated place (CDP) in Anderson County, South Carolina. It was first listed as a CDP in the 2020 census with a population of 476.

La France is located on U.S. Route 76 and South Carolina Highway 28, 10 miles (16 km) northwest of Anderson. La France has a post office with ZIP code 29656, which opened on April 12, 1871.

== Demographics ==
Historical population
Census	Pop.	Note	%±
2020	476		—
U.S. Decennial Census; 2020

La France first appeared as a census designated place in the 2020 U.S. census.

=== 2020 census ===
La France CDP, South Carolina – Demographic Profile (NH = Non-Hispanic)
Race / Ethnicity	Pop 2020	% 2020
White alone (NH)	391	82.14%
Black or African American alone (NH)	30	6.30%
Native American or Alaska Native alone (NH)	0	0.00%
Asian alone (NH)	1	0.21%
Pacific Islander alone (NH)	0	0.00%
Some Other Race alone (NH)	2	0.42%
Mixed Race/Multi-Racial (NH)	30	6.30%
Hispanic or Latino (any race)	22	4.62%
Total	476	100.00%

Note: the US Census treats Hispanic/Latino as an ethnic category. This table excludes Latinos from the racial categories and assigns them to a separate category. Hispanics/Latinos can be of any race.
