= AnMed Medical Center =

- AnMed

Geography
- Location: 800 N. Fant St. Anderson, South Carolina, United States
- Coordinates: 34.511°N 82.646°W

Services
- Emergency department: Level III trauma center
- Beds: 461

History
- Founded: 1908

Links
- Website: http://www.anmed.org
- Lists: Hospitals in South Carolina

AnMed Medical Center is a 461-bed acute care hospital at 800 N. Fant St. in Anderson, South Carolina. The Medical Center is the anchor facility for AnMed, South Carolina's largest independent, not-for-profit health system.

Services provided at the Medical Center include open heart surgery, vascular surgery, general surgery, bariatric surgery, emergency/trauma medicine, a stroke/neurological center, and diagnostic MRI, CT and laboratory medicine. Other facilities located at AnMed's medical center campus include Pediatric Therapy Works, a speech, occupational and physical therapy program for children; and CareConnect, a walk-in facility that treats non life-threatening ailments such as influenza, broken bones and minor nosebleeds.

== History ==
Virginia "Jennie" Gilmer is widely recognized as the founder of the Anderson County Hospital, which later became AnMed Health. In 1903, during the birth of her second child, Gilmer vowed that if she lived she would make sure a hospital was built in Anderson. Gilmer survived the delivery, and in May 1904, she and a small group of women started a fundraising campaign for the hospital.

The Anderson County Hospital Association was organized and incorporated in 1906, and fundraising efforts increased under the association's president, Richard S. Ligon. Anderson County Hospital opened its doors on April 20, 1908, and admitted its first patient a day later.

== Accredited ==
AnMed Medical Center is accredited by Det Norske Veritas (DNV).

== Achievements and awards ==
VPP status from OSHA. AnMed is the only hospital in the state to achieve this goal; A top performer on Key Quality Measures according to the Joint Commission; Recognition as a "Chest Pain Center with PCI" by the Society of Cardiovascular Patient Care (SCPC); Recognition as one of the nation's Most Wired hospitals and health systems; U.S. News & World Report has released its annual Best Hospitals rankings, placing AnMed among the state's best at number 2, tied with MUSC. AnMed is a Magnet Recognized facility, originally qualifying in 2012 and requalifying in 2017.
