= Charlies Creek =

Stream in Georgia and North Carolina, U.S.

Coordinates: 34°57′03″N 83°33′09″W

Charlies Creek is a stream in the U.S. states of Georgia and North Carolina. It is a tributary to the Tallulah River.

Charlies Creek was named after Charles R. Hicks (1767–1827), Second Principal Chief of the Cherokee Nation. Variant names are "Charles Creek", "Charlie Creek", and "Charlie's Creek".
