= Iva, South Carolina =

Iva
- Town
- Seal

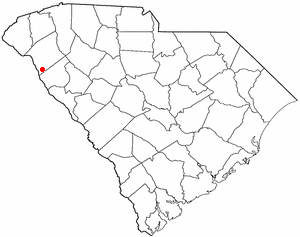
- Location of Iva, South Carolina
- Coordinates: 34°18′28″N 82°39′49″W
- Country: United States
- State: South Carolina
- County: Anderson

Area
  - Total: 1.03 sq mi (2.66 km^{2})
  - Land: 1.02 sq mi (2.65 km^{2})
  - Water: 0.0039 sq mi (0.01 km^{2})
- Elevation: 719 ft (219 m)

Population (2020)
  - Total: 1,015
  - Density: 991.1/sq mi (382.67/km^{2})
- Time zone: UTC-5 (Eastern (EST))
  - Summer (DST): UTC-4 (EDT)
- ZIP code: 29655
- Area codes: 864, 821
- FIPS code: 45-36160
- GNIS feature ID: 2405896
- Website: townofiva.org

Iva is a town in Anderson County, South Carolina. The population was 1,015 at the 2020 census.

== Geography ==
According to the United States Census Bureau, the town has a total area of 0.89 square miles (2.3 km^{2}), all land.

== Education ==
Public education in Iva is administered by Anderson School District 3, which operates Iva Elementary and Crescent High School.

Iva has a public library, a branch of the Anderson County Library System. In July 2024, construction began on conversion of a downtown former fire department building to house the branch, which is sharing space with the Iva Museum until completion.

== Demographics ==
Historical population
Census	Pop.	Note	%±
1910	804		—
1920	962		19.7%
1930	1,273		32.3%
1940	1,285		0.9%
1950	1,164		−9.4%
1960	1,357		16.6%
1970	1,114		−17.9%
1980	1,369		22.9%
1990	1,174		−14.2%
2000	1,156		−1.5%
2010	1,218		5.4%
2020	1,015		−16.7%
2022 (est.)	1,158	▲	14.1%
U.S. Decennial Census

=== 2020 census ===
Iva racial composition
Race	Num.	Perc.
White (non-Hispanic)	887	87.39%
Black or African American (non-Hispanic)	63	6.21%
Native American	3	0.3%
Asian	5	0.49%
Other/Mixed	37	3.65%
Hispanic or Latino	20	1.97%

As of the 2020 United States census, there were 1,015 people, 514 households, and 349 families residing in the town.

=== 2000 census ===
As of the census of 2000, there were 1,156 people, 501 households, and 319 families residing in the town. The population density was 1,286.1 inhabitants per square mile (496.6/km^{2}). There were 580 housing units at an average density of 645.3 units per square mile (249.2 units/km^{2}). The racial makeup of the town was 93.43% White, 6.31% African American, 0.09% Native American, 0.09% from other races, and 0.09% from two or more races. Hispanic or Latino of any race were 0.09% of the population.

There were 501 households in Iva, out of which 25.0% had children under the age of 18 living with them, 44.7% were married couples living together, 12.4% had a female householder with no husband present, and 36.3% were non-families. 33.9% of all households were made up of individuals, and 15.8% had someone living alone who was 65 years of age or older. The average household size was 2.20 and the average family size was 2.77.

In the town, the population was spread out, with 21.2% under the age of 18, 7.1% from 18 to 24, 25.0% from 25 to 44, 21.8% from 45 to 64, and 24.9% who were 65 years of age or older. The median age was 42 years. For every 100 females, there were 84.7 males. For every 100 females age 18 and over, there were 79.0 males.

The median income for a household in the town was $23,333, and the median income for a family was $34,432. Males had a median income of $25,682 versus $21,731 for females. The per capita income for the town was $14,756. About 8.5% of families and 15.2% of the population were below the poverty line, including 14.2% of those under age 18 and 22.6% of those age 65 or over.

== Notable people ==
- Ralph McT. Pennell, U.S. Army major general
