= Starr, South Carolina =

Starr
- Town
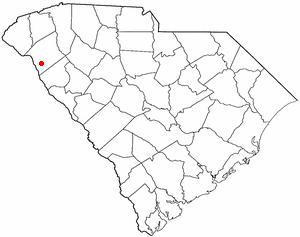
- Location of Starr, South Carolina
- Coordinates: 34°22′29″N 82°41′44″W
- Country: United States
- State: South Carolina
- County: Anderson

Area
  - Total: 1.50 sq mi (3.89 km^{2})
  - Land: 1.50 sq mi (3.88 km^{2})
  - Water: 0.0039 sq mi (0.01 km^{2})
- Elevation: 771 ft (235 m)

Population (2020)
  - Total: 165
  - Density: 110.2/sq mi (42.53/km^{2})
- Time zone: UTC-5 (Eastern (EST))
  - Summer (DST): UTC-4 (EDT)
- ZIP code: 29684
- Area codes: 864, 821
- FIPS code: 45-68875
- GNIS feature ID: 2406661
- Website: Town Facebook page

Starr is a town in Anderson County, South Carolina. The population was 165 at the 2020 census.

== Geography ==
Starr is located in southern Anderson County.

According to the United States Census Bureau, the town has a total area of 1.5 square miles (3.9 km^{2}), all land.

== Education ==
Elementary schools in Starr:

- Starr Elementary
- Flat-Rock Elementary

Middle schools in Starr:

- Starr-Iva Middle School

== Demographics ==
Historical population
Census	Pop.	Note	%±
1910	273		—
1920	347		27.1%
1930	361		4.0%
1940	349		−3.3%
1950	282		−19.2%
1960	243		−13.8%
1970	190		−21.8%
1980	241		26.8%
1990	164		−32.0%
2000	173		5.5%
2010	173		0.0%
2020	165		−4.6%
2022 (est.)	168	▲	1.8%
U.S. Decennial Census

As of the census of 2000, there were 173 people, 74 households, and 50 families residing in the town. The population density was 116.8 inhabitants per square mile (45.1/km^{2}). There were 82 housing units at an average density of 55.4 per square mile (21.4/km^{2}). The racial makeup of the town was 94.22% White, 3.47% African American, 0.58% from other races, and 1.73% from two or more races. Hispanic or Latino of any race were 2.89% of the population.

There were 74 households, out of which 24.3% had children under the age of 18 living with them, 59.5% were married couples living together, 5.4% had a female householder with no husband present, and 31.1% were non-families. 27.0% of all households were made up of individuals, and 12.2% had someone living alone who was 65 years of age or older. The average household size was 2.34 and the average family size was 2.82.

In the town, the population was spread out, with 19.1% under the age of 18, 9.2% from 18 to 24, 26.0% from 25 to 44, 31.8% from 45 to 64, and 13.9% who were 65 years of age or older. The median age was 40 years. For every 100 females, there were 98.9 males. For every 100 females age 18 and over, there were 91.8 males.

The median income for a household in the town was $34,167, and the median income for a family was $41,875. Males had a median income of $27,250 versus $21,875 for females. The per capita income for the town was $16,350. About 25.0% of families and 29.6% of the population were below the poverty line, including 46.3% of those under the age of eighteen and 18.5% of those 65 or over.

== Notable people ==
- Kip Anderson (1938 – 2007), soul and blues musician, also worked as a DJ in the 1990s.
- Wilton E. Hall, (1901 – 1980), publisher and broadcaster who also served as a U.S. senator 1944 – 1945.
