= Fair Play, South Carolina =

Census-designated place in South Carolina, United States

Fair Play
- CDP
- Location in Oconee County and the state of South Carolina.
- Coordinates: 34°30′40″N 82°59′08″W
- Country: United States
- State: South Carolina
- County: Oconee, Anderson

Area
  - Total: 6.79 sq mi (17.59 km^{2})
  - Land: 6.77 sq mi (17.53 km^{2})
  - Water: 0.023 sq mi (0.06 km^{2})
- Elevation: 781 ft (238 m)

Population (2020)
  - Total: 704
  - Density: 104.0/sq mi (40.16/km^{2})
- Time zone: UTC-5 (Eastern (EST))
  - Summer (DST): UTC-4 (EDT)
- ZIP codes: 29643
- FIPS code: 45-24730
- GNIS feature ID: 2584531

Fair Play is a census-designated place located in Oconee County in the U.S. state of South Carolina. A small portion of the CDP extends into Anderson County. As of the 2020 census, the population of Fair Play was 704.

== Geography ==
Fair Play is located in the southern corner of Oconee County, which occupies the northwestern corner of South Carolina. The CDP extends from the town center south to Lake Hartwell, a large reservoir on the South Carolina–Georgia line. Interstate 85 passes through the CDP, with access via exits 2 and 4. Greenville, South Carolina, is 44 miles (71 km) to the northeast, and Atlanta, Georgia, is 100 miles (160 km) to the southwest.

== Demographics ==
As of the 2020 US Census, the population of the area is 704 people.
