= Anderson County, South Carolina =

County in South Carolina, United States

- County
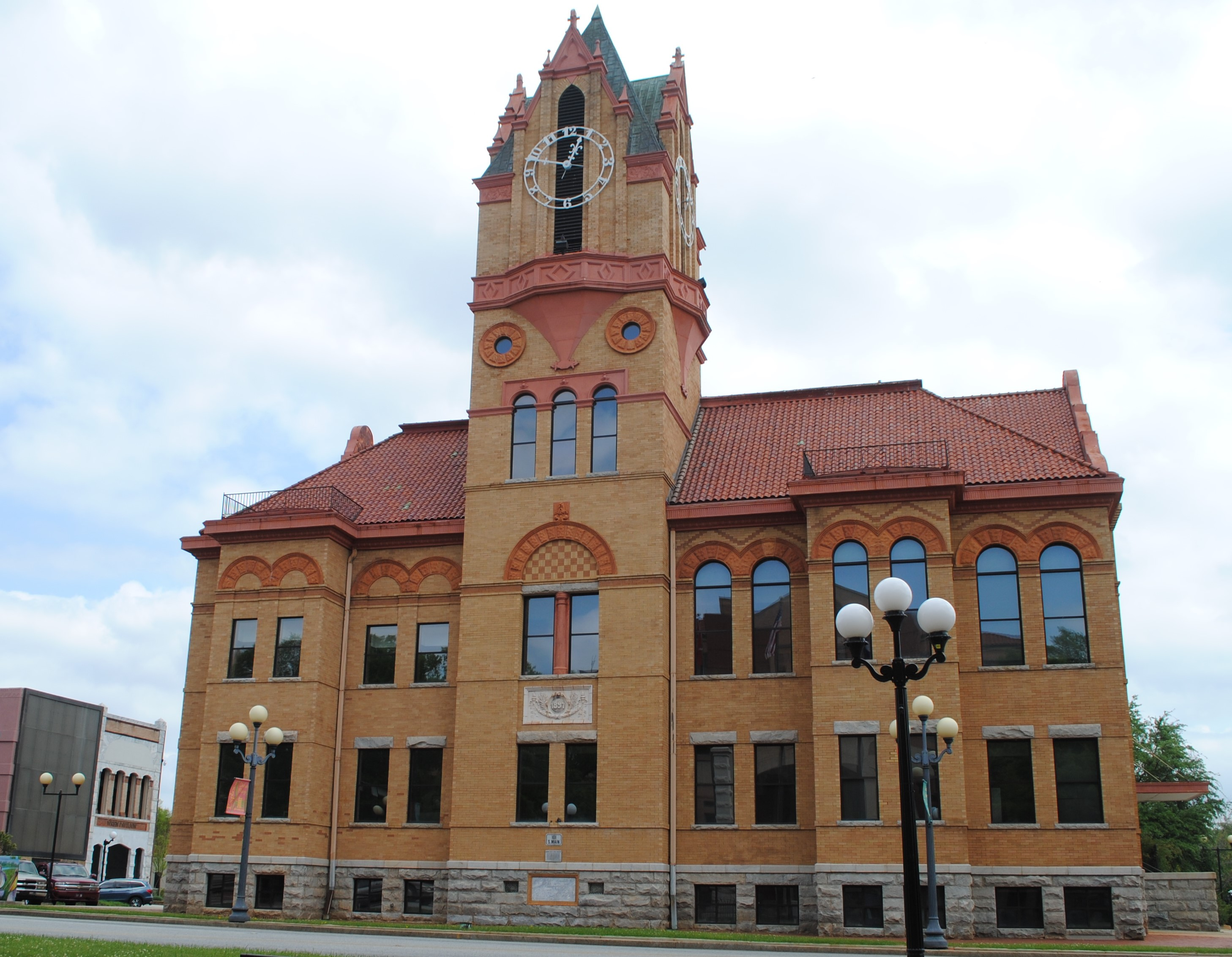
- Anderson County Courthouse

- Flag Seal Logo
- Motto: "Experience, Excel, Enjoy In Anderson County, SC"
- Location within the U.S. state of South Carolina
- Interactive map of Anderson County, South Carolina
- Coordinates: 34.52°N 82.64°W
- Country: United States
- State: South Carolina
- Founded: 1826
- Named for: Robert Anderson
- Seat: Anderson
- Largest community: Anderson

Area
  - Total: 755.76 sq mi (1,957.4 km^{2})
  - Land: 713.85 sq mi (1,848.9 km^{2})
  - Water: 41.91 sq mi (108.5 km^{2}) 5.55%

Population (2020)
  - Total: 203,718
  - Estimate (2025): 219,930 ▲
  - Density: 285.38/sq mi (110.19/km^{2})
- Time zone: UTC−5 (Eastern)
  - Summer (DST): UTC−4 (EDT)
- Congressional district: 3rd
- Website: www.andersoncountysc.org

Anderson County is located in the U.S. state of South Carolina. As of the 2020 census, its population was 203,718. Its county seat is Anderson. Named for Revolutionary War leader Robert Anderson, the county is located in northwestern South Carolina, along the state line of Georgia. The county is included in the Greenville-Anderson-Greer, SC metropolitan statistical area. Anderson County contains 55,950-acre (22,640 ha) Lake Hartwell, a U.S. Army Corps of Engineers lake with nearly 1,000 miles (1,600 km) of shoreline for residential and recreational use. The area is a growing industrial, commercial, and tourist center. It is the home of Anderson University, a private, selective comprehensive university with about 4,000 undergraduate and graduate students.

== History ==
Anderson County was founded in 1826 after the dissolution of the Pendleton District and was named after Robert Anderson, an American Revolutionary War general. During the Civil War, the county became a center of ammunitions production for the Confederate States Army. The county seat and largest city is Anderson; both the county and city are also located in the Greenville-Anderson-Greer metropolitan statistical area. Agriculturally, the county is ranked first in the southeast, second in the south, and 23rd in the United States according to the United States Department of Commerce. Cotton, corn, and various fruits and vegetables are grown along with a large poultry industry located the county.

== Geography ==
According to the U.S. Census Bureau, the county has a total area of 755.76 square miles (1,957.4 km^{2}), of which 41.91 square miles (108.5 km^{2}) (5.55%) are covered by water. Anderson County is in the Savannah River basin and the Saluda River basin.

=== State and local protected areas ===
- Broyles Recreation Area
- Fant's Grove Wildlife Management Area
- Sadlers Creek State Park

=== Major water bodies ===
- Chattooga River
- Lake Hartwell
- Saluda River
- Savannah River
- Lake Secession

=== Adjacent counties ===
- Pickens County – north
- Greenville County – northeast
- Laurens County – east
- Abbeville County – south
- Elbert County, Georgia – southwest
- Hart County, Georgia – west
- Oconee County – northwest

=== Major highways ===
- I-85
- US 29
- US 29 Bus.
- US 29 Conn.
- US 76
- US 178
- US 178 Conn.
- SC 8
- SC 20
- SC 20 Conn.
- SC 24
- SC 28
- SC 28 Bus. (Anderson)
- SC 28 Bus. (Pendleton)
- SC 81
- SC 88
- SC 187
- SC 252
- SC 247

=== Major infrastructure ===
- Anderson Regional Airport

== Demographics ==
Historical population
Census	Pop.	Note	%±
1830	17,169		—
1840	18,493		7.7%
1850	21,475		16.1%
1860	22,873		6.5%
1870	24,049		5.1%
1880	33,612		39.8%
1890	43,696		30.0%
1900	55,728		27.5%
1910	69,568		24.8%
1920	76,349		9.7%
1930	80,949		6.0%
1940	88,712		9.6%
1950	90,664		2.2%
1960	98,478		8.6%
1970	105,474		7.1%
1980	133,235		26.3%
1990	145,196		9.0%
2000	165,740		14.1%
2010	187,126		12.9%
2020	203,718		8.9%
2025 (est.)	219,930	▲	8.0%
U.S. Decennial Census; 1790–1960 1900–1990; 1990–2000 2010 2020

=== 2020 census ===
As of the 2020 census, 203,718 people lived in the county across 80,372 households; 52,038 of those households were families.

The median age was 41.1 years. 22.5% of residents were under the age of 18 and 18.9% of residents were 65 years of age or older. For every 100 females there were 93.0 males, and for every 100 females age 18 and over there were 89.9 males.

As of the 2020 census, the racial makeup of the county was 75.8% White, 14.9% Black or African American, 0.3% American Indian and Alaska Native, 1.2% Asian, 0.0% Native Hawaiian and Pacific Islander, 2.3% from some other race, and 5.4% from two or more races. Hispanic or Latino residents of any race comprised 4.7% of the population.

58.3% of residents lived in urban areas, while 41.7% lived in rural areas.

Of the 80,372 households, 30.3% had children under the age of 18 living with them and 27.9% had a female householder with no spouse or partner present. About 26.3% of all households were made up of individuals and 11.9% had someone living alone who was 65 years of age or older.

There were 89,123 housing units, of which 9.8% were vacant. Among occupied housing units, 73.2% were owner-occupied and 26.8% were renter-occupied. The homeowner vacancy rate was 1.6% and the rental vacancy rate was 9.2%.

=== Racial and ethnic composition ===
Anderson County, South Carolina – Racial and ethnic composition Note: the US Census treats Hispanic/Latino as an ethnic category. This table excludes Latinos from the racial categories and assigns them to a separate category. Hispanics/Latinos may be of any race.
Race / Ethnicity (NH = Non-Hispanic)	Pop 1980	Pop 1990	Pop 2000	Pop 2010	Pop 2020	% 1980	% 1990	% 2000	% 2010	% 2020
White alone (NH)	109,320	120,013	134,151	147,362	152,396	82.05%	82.66%	80.94%	78.75%	74.81%
Black or African American alone (NH)	22,625	24,097	27,399	29,810	30,214	16.98%	16.60%	16.53%	15.93%	14.83%
Native American or Alaska Native alone (NH)	113	163	336	420	425	0.08%	0.11%	0.20%	0.22%	0.21%
Asian alone (NH)	250	334	698	1,384	2,404	0.19%	0.23%	0.42%	0.74%	1.18%
Native Hawaiian or Pacific Islander alone (NH)	x	x	20	29	46	x	x	0.01%	0.02%	0.02%
Other race alone (NH)	102	30	112	183	698	0.08%	0.02%	0.07%	0.10%	0.34%
Mixed race or Multiracial (NH)	x	x	1,192	2,491	7,961	x	x	0.72%	1.33%	3.91%
Hispanic or Latino (any race)	825	559	1,832	5,447	9,574	0.62%	0.38%	1.11%	2.91%	4.70%
Total	133,235	145,196	165,740	187,126	203,718	100.00%	100.00%	100.00%	100.00%	100.00%

=== 2010 census ===
At the 2010 census, there were 187,126 people, 73,829 households, and 51,922 families residing in the county. The population density was 261.6 inhabitants per square mile (101.0/km^{2}). There were 84,774 housing units at an average density of 118.5 per square mile (45.8/km^{2}). The racial makeup of the county was 80.1% White, 16.0% Black or African American, 0.8% Asian, 0.3% American Indian, 1.3% from other races, and 1.5% from two or more races. Those of Hispanic or Latino origin made up 2.9% of the population. In terms of ancestry, 15.9% were American, 13.6% were Irish, 10.8% were English, and 10.2% were German.

Of the 73,829 households, 33.3% had children under 18 living with them, 51.1% were married couples living together, 14.5% had a female householder with no husband present, 29.7% were not families, and 25.4% of all households were made up of individuals. The average household size was 2.50 and the average family size was 2.98. The median age was 39.7 years.

The median income for a household in the county was $42,871 and for a family was $53,229. Males had a median income of $41,885 versus $30,920 for females. The per capita income for the county was $22,117. About 12.4% of families and 15.8% of the population were below the poverty line, including 23.0% of those under 18 and 10.2% of those 65 or over.

== Law and government ==
Anderson County has a council-administrator form of government under South Carolina law. County council members are elected from seven single-member districts for two-year terms. All seven council seats are open for election every two years.

Anderson County councilmen are:

- District 1: John B. Wright Jr. (North Anderson)
- District 2: Glenn A. Davis (South and East Anderson)
- District 3: S. Ray Graham (Belton/Starr/Iva area)
- District 4: Brett Sanders (Pendleton area)
- District 5: Tommy Dunn (West Anderson)
- District 6: Jimmy Davis (Powdersville area)
- District 7: M. Cindy Wilson (Williamston/Honea Path area)

The Anderson county administrator is Rusty Burns.

=== Operations ===
Anderson County has 10 divisions:

- Administration
- Parks, Recreation, and Tourism
- Central Services
- Economic Development
- Emergency Services
- EMS and Special Operations
- Environmental Services
- Finance
- Planning
- Transportation

=== Politics ===
United States presidential election results for Anderson County, South Carolina
Year	Republican		Democratic		Third party(ies)	
Year	No.	%	No.	%	No.	%
1892	193	7.47%	2,248	86.96%	144	5.57%
1896	368	10.53%	3,109	88.98%	17	0.49%
1900	68	3.53%	1,858	96.47%	0	0.00%
1904	66	3.27%	1,952	96.73%	0	0.00%
1908	58	2.69%	2,099	97.18%	3	0.14%
1912	25	1.10%	2,158	95.28%	82	3.62%
1916	6	0.23%	2,609	99.50%	7	0.27%
1920	33	1.31%	2,489	98.69%	0	0.00%
1924	9	0.61%	1,455	99.18%	3	0.20%
1928	61	3.31%	1,780	96.69%	0	0.00%
1932	30	0.73%	4,067	99.27%	0	0.00%
1936	26	0.64%	4,025	99.36%	0	0.00%
1940	86	2.23%	3,763	97.77%	0	0.00%
1944	89	2.99%	2,687	90.23%	202	6.78%
1948	105	2.61%	2,581	64.08%	1,342	33.32%
1952	3,338	22.25%	11,664	77.75%	0	0.00%
1956	2,186	14.80%	11,344	76.80%	1,241	8.40%
1960	3,845	21.67%	13,901	78.33%	0	0.00%
1964	8,398	41.85%	11,670	58.15%	0	0.00%
1968	5,661	24.33%	5,218	22.43%	12,384	53.23%
1972	17,514	75.19%	5,241	22.50%	537	2.31%
1976	9,496	33.14%	19,002	66.32%	156	0.54%
1980	15,667	44.38%	18,801	53.25%	837	2.37%
1984	24,123	69.54%	10,324	29.76%	244	0.70%
1988	25,939	67.58%	12,281	32.00%	163	0.42%
1992	24,793	51.68%	16,072	33.50%	7,106	14.81%
1996	24,137	52.74%	17,460	38.15%	4,172	9.12%
2000	35,827	63.21%	19,606	34.59%	1,248	2.20%
2004	43,355	66.99%	20,697	31.98%	670	1.04%
2008	48,690	65.99%	24,132	32.70%	965	1.31%
2012	48,709	67.45%	22,405	31.03%	1,098	1.52%
2016	56,232	69.87%	21,097	26.21%	3,154	3.92%
2020	67,565	70.31%	27,169	28.27%	1,359	1.41%
2024	71,828	73.07%	25,281	25.72%	1,187	1.21%

Since the 1980s, Anderson County has consistently voted Republican in presidential elections, with the party winning the county in every election since 1984.

== Economy ==
Early industry in the county was textile mills, processing southern cotton. In the 21st century, industry has diversified with more than 230 manufacturers, including 22 international companies. The top major industries in Anderson include manufacturers of automotive products, metal products, industrial machinery, plastics, publishing, and textiles. More than 27 BMW suppliers are in the upstate, which is recognized internationally as an automotive supplier hub. The plastic industry has a strong presence in the upstate, with 244 plastic companies located within the 10 counties of the northwest corner of the state. Anderson County has 11 automotive suppliers and is a major player in the plastic industry, with 27 plastic companies located within its borders.

As of April 2024, some of the top employers in the county include AnMed Health Medical Center, Anderson University, Bosch, the City of Anderson, Glen Raven, Inc., Ingles, Michelin, Walmart, and Walgreens. Between 2021 and 2024, the unemployment rate has fluctuated around 3%. In 2022, its GDP was $9.1 billion (approx. $44,670 per capita). In chained 2017 dollars, its real GDP was $7.6 billion (approx. $37,306 per capita).

Employment and Wage Statistics by Industry in Anderson County, South Carolina
Industry	Employment Counts	Employment Percentage (%)	Average Annual Wage ($)
Accommodation and Food Services	7,865	11.1	19,760
Administrative and Support and Waste Management and Remediation Services	2,695	3.8	38,272
Agriculture, Forestry, Fishing and Hunting	167	0.2	49,712
Arts, Entertainment, and Recreation	864	1.2	16,016
Construction	2,947	4.2	56,368
Educational Services	5,822	8.2	50,440
Finance and Insurance	1,043	1.5	60,476
Health Care and Social Assistance	11,076	15.7	54,652
Information	475	0.7	62,816
Management of Companies and Enterprises	212	0.3	121,992
Manufacturing	16,042	22.7	61,048
Mining, Quarrying, and Oil and Gas Extraction	97	0.1	70,616
Other Services (except Public Administration)	1,465	2.1	40,560
Professional, Scientific, and Technical Services	2,153	3.0	54,444
Public Administration	2,634	3.7	45,708
Real Estate and Rental and Leasing	532	0.8	44,824
Retail Trade	9,313	13.2	32,344
Transportation and Warehousing	2,185	3.1	56,264
Utilities	350	0.5	83,304
Wholesale Trade	2,783	3.9	61,048
Total	70,720	100.0%	48,004

== Communities ==
=== Cities ===
- Anderson (county seat and largest community)
- Belton
- Clemson (mostly in Pickens County)
- Easley (mostly in Pickens County)

=== Towns ===
- Honea Path (partly in Abbeville County)
- Iva
- Pelzer
- Pendleton
- Starr
- West Pelzer
- Williamston

=== Census-designated places ===
- Centerville
- Fair Play (mostly in Oconee County)
- Homeland Park
- La France
- Northlake
- Piedmont (partly in Greenville County)
- Powdersville
- Sandy Springs

=== Unincorporated communities ===
- Cheddar
- Craytonville
- Piercetown
- Townville (partly in Oconee County)

== Education ==
There are five school districts in Anderson County.

- Anderson School District 1
- Anderson School District 2
- Anderson School District 3
- Anderson School District 4
- Anderson School District 5

== See also ==
- List of counties in South Carolina
- National Register of Historic Places listings in Anderson County, South Carolina
