= List of South Carolina Scenic Byways =

South Carolina Scenic Byways
- Highway marker

Highway names
- Interstates: Interstate X (I-X)
- US Highways: US Highway X (US X)
- State: South Carolina Highway X (SC X)

System links
- South Carolina State Highway System; Interstate; US; State; Scenic

The South Carolina Scenic Byways consists of roads in the state of South Carolina that travel through areas of scenic, historic, and cultural significance. The intent of this system is to provide travelers with a safe and interesting alternate route.

== National scenic byway ==
Name	Highways	Notes
Ashley River Road	SC 61	
Cherokee Foothills Scenic Highway	SC 11	
Edisto Island National Scenic Byway	SC 174	
Savannah River Scenic Byway	SC 24 / SC 28 / SC 181 / SC 187	

== State scenic byway ==
Name	Highways	Notes
Andrew Pickens Scenic Parkway	SC 11	
Bohicket Road	Bohicket Road	
Cowpens National Battlefield	SC 110	
Falling Waters	SC 107	
Fort Johnson Road	Fort Johnson Road	
Hilton Head Highway	US 278	
James Edwin McTeer Bridge & the Causeways	US 21 / SC 802	
Long Point Road	Long Point Road	
Mathis Ferry Road	Mathis Ferry Road	
Old Sheldon Church Road	Old Sheldon Church Road	
Riverland Drive	Riverland Drive	
S-13	S-7-13	
S-163	S-7-163	
South Carolina Highway 46	SC 46	
South Carolina Highway 170	SC 170	
US Highway 21	US 21	
US Highway 278	US 278	
Western York County	SC 161	
