= Ed Samples =

American racing driver (1921–1991)

Ed Samples (January 31, 1921 – June 10, 1991) was a pioneering American stock car driver, who competed in NSCRA and NASCAR events in the 1940s and early 1950s. He was the winner of the 1946 stock car racing championship and later won the 1949 NSCRA championship.

== Early life ==
Born January 31, 1921 in Atlanta, Georgia, and driving from the early age of eight, Samples became one of the better-known moonshine runners in the Dawsonville area, a hotbed of the production of moonshine liquor during and after Prohibition. He survived being shot three times in a dispute over the production of the liquor shortly before World War II; soon afterward he changed his career to competition on the racetrack after observing the racing prowess of fellow moonshiner Lloyd Seay, declaring auto racing to be "safer than moonshine". He raced motorcycles a few times before switching fully to stock cars.

== Stock car career ==
Samples raced at tracks such as Lakewood Speedway in the early, pre-World War II era of stock car racing; in the track's 1941 Labor Day event he battled for the lead before crashing out of the race. In 1946, Samples won the first stock car race promoted by Bill France Sr. held outside Daytona Beach, Florida, an event held on Independence Day at Greenville-Pickens Speedway; the win, among others the inaugural National Championship Stock Car Circuit (NCSCC) event, run on the beach at Daytona on June 30 of that year, allowed Samples to be declared the 1946 national champion of stock car racing, a consensus decision among officers of the NCSCC, the National Stock Car Racing Association, and the U.S. Stock Car Drivers Association, defeating Roy Hall and Bob Flock for the title.

Samples was a front-runner on France's NCSCC circuit in the late 1940s; he finished second in the series, which sanctioned "modifieds", in the final 1947 season standings, behind Fonty Flock and ahead of Red Byron. In December 1947, Samples was present at the famous meeting at the Streamline Hotel that saw the formation of NASCAR; 1948 would see Samples win the South Carolina Racing Association championship, winning ten consecutive races throughout the season.

Samples' 1949 season was interrupted when he was one of three drivers banned from NASCAR competition by Bill France for "conduct detrimental to the best interests of the National Association for Stock Car Auto Racing" following their competing in an NSCRA event the same weekend as a NASCAR race; he was reinstated later in the year following the payment of a fine. Samples would see his championship points stripped under France's policy that drivers who raced in non-NASCAR sanctioned events would be penalized; however, in the NSCRA series promoted by Weyman Milam and Bruton Smith, he would win the 1949 championship. In 1951, he was leading the NSCRA championship when the series folded; he would move to NASCAR more regularly after that, but would never win a race in the series' top tour, the Grand National Division, although he did win the Birmingham Racing Club Championship in 1954 and 1955. He retired from racing competition in 1956, running a speed shop and repair station in Atlanta, Georgia.

Samples, described by Tim Flock as "one of the best Modified drivers I've ever seen", died in 1991; survived by his wife Virginia and son Eddie, he was inducted into the Georgia Racing Hall of Fame as part of its 2003 class.

Sporting positions
Preceded by Roy Hall (Unofficial)	National Stock Car Champion; 1946	Succeeded by Fonty Flock (NCSCC)
Preceded by Buddy Shuman	National Stock Car Racing Association Champion; 1949	Succeeded by Buddy Shuman
Preceded by Buddy Shuman	National Stock Car Racing Association Champion; 1951 (Unofficial)	Succeeded by Series closed
