= School District of Pickens County (South Carolina) =

School district in South Carolina, United States

School District of Pickens County (SDPC) is a school district headquartered in Easley, South Carolina. The district covers all of Pickens County.

The district has boundaries paralleling those of the county.

== History ==
Henry Hunt was scheduled to begin being the superintendent of the district in 2009.

In 2009, after the State of South Carolina reduced school budgets, the district had the possibility of reducing the number of teachers.

Kelly Pew's term of superintendent ended in 2014 when she received employment in another school district. The board of trustees selected Danny Merck as the next superintendent.

== Schools ==
High schools

- D. W. Daniel High School
- Easley High School
- Liberty High School
- Pickens High School

Middle schools

- Dacusville Middle School
- R.C. Edwards Middle School
- R.H. Gettys Middle School
- Liberty Middle School
- Pickens Middle School

Elementary schools

- Ambler Elementary School
- Central Academy of the Arts
- Clemson Elementary School
- Crosswell Elementary School
- Dacusville Elementary School
- East End Elementary School
- Forest Acres Elementary School
- Hagood Elementary School
- Liberty Elementary School
- Liberty Primary School
- McKissick Academy of Science & Technology
- Pickens Elementary School
- Six Mile Elementary School
- West End Elementary School

== Former schools ==
- Clear View High School
