= West End Elementary School =

West End Elementary School can refer to:

- West End Elementary School (Carey, Ohio), on the National Register of Historic Places
- West End Elementary School (Gaffney, South Carolina), a former NRHP
- West End Elementary School (Easley, South Carolina)
- West End Elementary School (Meadville, Pennsylvania)
