= Buddy Shuman =

American stock car racing driver (1915–1955)

- Born: September 8, 1915; Charlotte, North Carolina, U.S.
- Died: November 13, 1955 (aged 40)
- Cause of death: Hotel fire

NASCAR Cup Series career
- 29 races run over 4 years
- Best finish: 6th (1951)
- First race: 1951 Greenville-Pickens Speedway Race (Greenville-Pickens Speedway)
- Last race: 1955 Southern States Fairgrounds Race (Charlotte)
- First win: 1952 Stamford Park Race (Niagara Falls)
- Last win: 1952 Stamford Park Race (Niagara Falls)
Wins	Top tens	Poles
1	16	0
- Statistics up to date as of March 22, 2007.

Buddy Shuman (September 8, 1915 – November 13, 1955) was an American stock car driver who competed in the NASCAR Grand National Series. He raced between 1951 until 1955, achieving one victory, four top-fives, and 16 top-tens. Shuman is best known for winning his one and only race in 1952 at Stamford Park in Niagara Falls, Ontario, the first NASCAR Grand National Series race held in Canada.

Shuman died in a hotel fire the night before the start of the 1956 NASCAR Grand National campaign. He had been tasked to head Ford's effort to succeed in NASCAR.

Sporting positions
Preceded by Inaugural	National Stock Car Racing Association Champion; 1948	Succeeded by Ed Samples
Preceded by Ed Samples	National Stock Car Racing Association Champion; 1950	Succeeded by Ed Samples (Unofficial)
