= Jay Hagood =

American football player (born 1973)

No. 77
- Position: Offensive tackle

Personal information
- Born: August 9, 1973 (age 53); Easley, South Carolina, U.S.
- Listed height: 6 ft 5 in (1.96 m)
- Listed weight: 306 lb (139 kg)

Career information
- High school: Easley
- College: Virginia Tech
- NFL draft: 1997: undrafted

Career history
- New York Jets (1997); Miami Dolphins (1998)*; Frankfurt Galaxy (1999–2000); New Orleans Saints (2000)*; Berlin Thunder (2001); New Orleans Saints (2001)*
- * Offseason or practice squad member only
- Stats at Pro Football Reference

Jay Dwight Hagood (born August 9, 1973) is an American former professional football player who was an offensive lineman for the New York Jets of the National Football League (NFL). He played college football for the Virginia Tech Hokies.

== Playing career ==
He briefly played for the New York Jets of the National Football League, before continuing his career in the NFL Europe. Hagood played college football at Virginia Tech.

A native of Easley, South Carolina, Hagood attended Easley High School, before spending a prep school year at Fork Union Military Academy.
