= Pickens High School =

Pickens High School may refer to:

- Pickens High School (Georgia)
- Pickens High School (South Carolina)
