= Greenville-Pickens Speedway =

Motorsport track in the United States

- Location: 3800 Calhoun Memorial Highway; Easley, South Carolina; 29640
- Coordinates: 34°50′0″N 82°30′1″W
- Capacity: Between 9,000 to 10,000
- Opened: July 4, 1946; 80 years ago
- Closed: 2023; 3 years ago
- Major events: Former: NASCAR K&N Pro Series East; Kevin Whitaker Chevrolet 150 (2006–2017); Kevin Whitaker Chevrolet 140 (2011–2014, 2016); CARS Tour (1999–2000, 2005, 2010, 2016, 2020–2022); NASCAR Whelen Southern Modified Tour (2006–2007); NASCAR Elite Division Midwest Series (2006); NASCAR Southeast Series (1991–2006); NASCAR Budweiser Late Model Sportsman Series (1983); NASCAR Grand National East Series (1972); NASCAR Cup Series (1955–1956, 1958–1971); NASCAR Convertible Series (1956–1959)
- Website: greenvillepickens.com Archived January 30, 2023, at the Wayback Machine

Oval (1970–2023)
- Surface: Asphalt
- Length: 0.500 mi (0.805 km)
- Banking: 5° (Turns)

Oval (1946–1970)
- Surface: Dirt
- Length: 0.500 mi (0.805 km)

Greenville-Pickens Speedway is an inactive 0.5 mi (0.805 km) oval short track in Easley, South Carolina. The track formerly held NASCAR-sanctioned and CARS Tour races. The track is owned by Kevin Whitaker and is currently undergoing a redevelopment plan to turn the surrounding land into an industrial park, with the future of the facility itself being uncertain.

Built in 1946 by Bob Willimon, Greenville-Pickens Speedway was opened as a dual-use dirt track for horse racing and auto racing. After six years under Willimon's leadership, the track shut down for two years before reopening in 1954. The following year, brothers Pete and Tom Blackwell bought the facility, owning it until 2003. Under the duo's leadership, the track held NASCAR sanctioned events, was fully paved, and hosted the first live, flag-to-flag Cup Series event in NASCAR's history. In 2003, car dealership owner Kevin Whitaker bought out the facility and held racing events including the Cars Tour. After 2022, the facility was again put up for sale with the intent of turning the land into an industrial park. As of 2025, the track remains but is in a dilapidated state, with the surrounding land having been converted into an industrial park complex.

== Description ==
=== Configuration ===
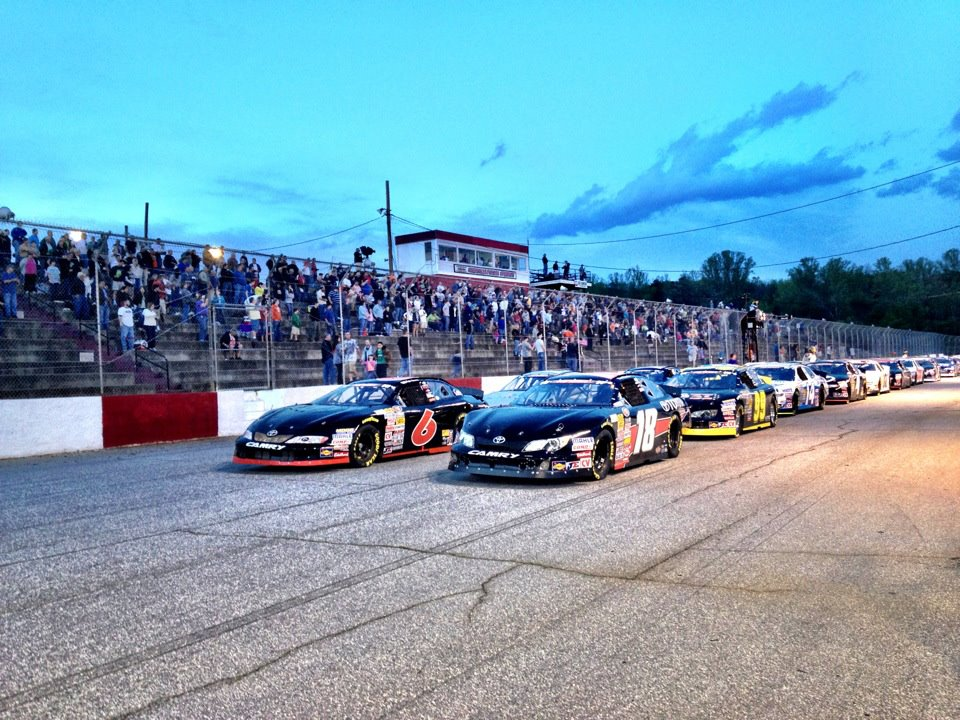
Greenville-Pickens Speedway in 2012.

The track in its current form is measured at 0.5 mi (0.80 km), with 5 degrees of banking in the turns. Prior to 1970, the track had a dirt surface.

=== Amenities ===
Greenville-Pickens Speedway is served by U.S. Route 123 and South Carolina Highway 124. As of 1996, the track had a capacity of "between 9,000 and 10,000" according to The Greenville News. The track's retaining walls feature the names of previous track champions at the track as decoration.

== Track history ==
=== Early years ===
On June 4, 1946, the Associated Press reported that auto racing promoter Bill France Sr. announced plans to host an auto racing and horse racing program in Greenville, South Carolina, on a dirt track built and financed by Bob Willimon. By the time of the announcement, the track was "near completion", with the banking of the track having been completed. According to The Greenville News, Willimon bought the land from a mail carrier and initially wanted to make the facility a horse racing-exclusive track; however, he was convinced otherwise by France Sr. Approximately three weeks after the announcement, an opening date for the now-named Greenville-Pickens Speedway was announced for July 4, with the program hosting both automobile and horse racing. The speedway opened as scheduled, with driver Ed Samples and horse Judge Patcher winning the first auto and horse races, respectively. The program was considered to be successful by local Greenville media; however, the race was marred by heavy dust. Future events that year saw sustained success, breaking the attendance record for a sporting event in South Carolina. In October, racing events on Sundays were briefly banned at the track due to local blue laws; however, the ban was overturned in the following month.

In 1947, Willimon sold controlling interest of the track to John H. Holcombe and Buddy Davenport, with each of the three owning a third of the track. Under the group's control, floodlights to host night racing were installed at the track in 1948. After five years of the group's control, the track closed for almost two years after the end of the 1952 racing season, reopening in 1954 under promoter W. A. McFalls for motorcycle racing. A year later, a new lighting system was installed under promoter Joe Bailey. On October 6, the first NASCAR Cup Series race was run at the facility, with Bob Flock winning the event after initial winner Jim Reed was disqualified for an illegal engine.

=== Blackwell brothers era ===
In December 1955, the speedway was bought by eventual long-time owners Pete Blackwell and Tom Blackwell, who demolished the existing horse stables upon purchase. In 1959, a concrete grandstand was built to replace the old existing grandstand. Four years later, seating capacity was expanded to "in an excess of 3,000". The following year, a new concrete outside retaining wall was erected on the track's backstretch; the wall was later extended to the last two turns and a part of the first two turns a year later. In 1970, Greenville-Pickens Speedway was paved after 25 racing seasons on a dirt surface; the paving was completed in two weeks in the month of April, with the new track surface hosting its first races on April 18. A year later, the track hosted the first flag-to-flag NASCAR Cup Series race broadcast on national television, broadcasting the 1971 Greenville 200 on the American Broadcasting Company's (ABC) Wide World of Sports program.

After the 1982 racing season, the Blackwells sold off the facility to firm Jarvis–Landry Associates for $1,000,000 (adjusted for inflation, $3,232,543). However, two years later, the Blackwells repurchased the facility from Jarvis–Landry after the firm experienced financial issues. In 1987, the track's pit road entrance was moved to the fourth turn and the pit area was expanded. A year later, the track surface was repaved for the first time since the track's initial paving in 1970. Starting in the mid-1990s, a period of major renovations began. In 1995, the track surfaced was repaved for the second time in the track's history. Within the year, Pete Blackwell announced the construction of new concrete grandstand to replace the old frontstretch grandstand, in the process increasing seating capacity to "between 9,000 and 10,000". The expansion was completed in 1996, with Pete announced further proposed plans for seating expansion and the construction of corporate suites being announced by Pete. The upgrades led to the track being used as a testing facility for the NASCAR Cup Series, with teams often testing at the track until 2015 when a ban on testing on non-Cup Series tracks was imposed. On May 11, 2000, co-owner Pete Blackwell died, leaving Tom as the sole owner of the track.

=== Kevin Whitaker era and inactivity ===
In 2003, Tom Blackwell sold the speedway to Kevin Whitaker, a Greenville car dealer. Blackwell stayed as the general manager and promoter, and the facility hosted a Kevin Whitaker Chevrolet 150 race annually from 2006 to 2017 as part of the NASCAR K&N Pro Series East. Blackwell died in 2010. In January 2023, The State reported that the track faced an uncertain near future, with no racing events scheduled for the 2023 racing season and talk of potential sale of the facility. Two months later, real estate company RealtyLink acquired a contract to purchase the track. On March 15, shortly after the track was listed for purchase to build an industrial park, racing driver Jackie Manley began arranging with Whitaker a lease of the facility for races, hoping to crowdfund $103,000 by mid-April. However, with the funding goal not being met in May, Manley's plans were completely scrapped in July, with $60,000 having been raised for the lease.

In November 2023, RealtyLink's plans to start construction on a 289-acre (117 ha) industrial park around the speedway were approved, with RealtyLink owner Phil Wilson stating that he did not wish to buy out the speedway itself. Eight months later, with the project expanding to include 600 acres (240 ha) over the span of three phases, groundbreaking on the first phase of construction began on June 20. Shortly after, the racetrack itself was placed for sale by RealtyLink for $5.8 million. In January 2025, the third phase of construction, to include the demolition of the speedway, was denied by the Pickens County Planning Commission, and RealtyLink agreed to wait one year before reseeking approval for the phase. As of March 2025, the track was said to have purchase offers of approximately $3 million – about half of the asking price – according to The State. On April 4, 2026, a "Save the Speedway" rally was held at District Park in Easley, featuring gubernatorial candidate Alan Wilson as a speaker.

== Events ==
=== NASCAR ===
Greenville-Pickens Speedway formerly held at least one NASCAR Cup Series race in two separate periods: from 1955 to 1956 and from 1958 to 1971. The track has also held NASCAR Weekly Racing Series races since 1952 across multiple divisions. In the track's final racing season in 2022, the venue hosted five divisions: late models, super stocks, renegades, pure stocks, and a four-cylinder engine and four-wheel drive division.

=== Cars Tour ===
The track formerly held CARS Tour races on multiple occasions from 1999 to 2000, 2005, 2010, 2016, and 2020 to 2022.

=== State fairs ===
Since 1964, the track has held the Upper South Carolina State Fair.
