= Jasmine Twitty =

American judge (born 1989)

Jasmine Twitty (born December 4, 1989) is a former associate judge for the Easley, South Carolina municipal court. At the time of her appointment to the position of associate judge of the municipal court for the city of Easley, South Carolina in August 2015, she was the youngest judge to ever be appointed or elected as a municipal court judge in U.S. history at the age of 25. She held that distinction until 2021 when Matthew Bradley became the municipal court judge of Dinosaur, Colorado at age 24.

== Education and career ==
Twitty graduated from the College of Charleston with a degree in political science. She previously worked for the Greenville County Bond Court as a night clerk. After completing a training program and passing a certification examination, Twitty was sworn in as a judge at the age of 25. In South Carolina, summary court judges are not required to have a J.D. degree when appointed.

== Personal life ==
In addition to her career as a judge, she regularly volunteers at the Urban League of the Upstate. Twitty also was a founding member of a group dedicated to the professional development of women in the Upstate called "LeadHER". In October 2020, she was featured in Forbes magazine's Trailblazer series for making judicial history.

== See also ==
- List of African-American firsts
- List of African-American jurists
- South Carolina government and politics
