= Pickens High School (South Carolina) =

Location
- 4314 Moorefield Memorial Highway; Pickens, South Carolina 29671; United States; 34°54′22″N 82°42′59″W

Information
- School district: School District of Pickens County
- Teaching staff: 79.00 (FTE)
- Enrollment: 1,281 (2023–2024)
- Student to teacher ratio: 16.22
- Colors: White and blue
- Team name: Blue Flame
- Website: phs.pickens.k12.sc.us

Pickens High School is a high school in Pickens, South Carolina. It is the second largest high school in the Pickens County School District, after its rival, Easley High School.

== Alma mater ==
The Pickens High School Alma Mater is called "Alma Mater, Pickens High". Tradition says that students, teachers, and alumni stand at attention until the final line. At that time, they place their right hands over their hearts for the words "Alma Mater," then salute (right arm extended and raised and hold up a certain number of fingers depending on how many years of school you have left, seniors hold up one, juniors two, sophomores three, freshman four) during the words "Pickens High."

== Food Fight Bowl ==

Pickens High enjoys a rivalry with Easley High School. Easley is a high school seven miles southeast of Pickens. This rivalry is widely known as one of the fiercest rivalries in South Carolina. This game was named the Food Fight Bowl by the Pickens County Meals on Wheels in 2008 when the organization became the rivalry's sponsor.

On game day, the festivities start with the Meals on Wheels Food Fight Bowl Tailgate Party either in Legacy Square in Pickens or Easley High School NJROTC Drill Practice field in Easley. During that time, students and fans of the two rival schools enjoy food provided by local businesses. All proceeds go to Meals on Wheels. After two hours, the Meals on Wheels Talent Show starts, with two acts from each school. Fans vote for their school (not individual acts) through donations to Meals on Wheels, combining student donations from the previous month and the voting donations from the talent show. A panel of judges gives a Champion's Football to the best act. The school that collected the most money wins the Ultimate Food Fight Trophy, which is awarded at halftime. Then the marching bands and cheerleaders lead the procession down to the home team's stadium, where fans buy tickets and enter the stadium. The winner of the game is awarded the Food Fight Bowl Trophy.

The 2010 Food Fight Bowl was broadcast live by CSS Sports on cable television.

== Football music ==
"Scotland the Brave", is used as the pregame entrance fanfare of the Blue Flame. The Pickens fight song is titled "When the Flame Goes Burning In", which is a variant of "When the Saints Go Marching In". When the team scores, the drumline plays a cadence called "Bananas." This cadence begins with rolls up and down the bass drums, interspersed with the student section and the rest of the band shouting "Go Blue Flame" This is followed by a solo played on the tenors, while the rest of the band adds visual effect by dancing or moving their instruments. When this ends, the drumline starts up a cadence to which the crowd spells out Pickens. Right after the 'C', the band all scream "Yeah Boy", and the drumline plays a triplet to get everyone on beat. After Pickens is spelled out, the entire crowd yells, "Pickens, Blue Flame, fight, fight, fight!" This is followed by a short tenor solo.
