= Easley High School =

Location
- 154 Green Wave Boulevard; Easley, South Carolina 29640; United States; 34°47′22″N 82°34′57″W

Information
- Other name: EHS
- Type: Public high school
- Motto: Character First, then Scholarship
- School district: School District of Pickens County
- NCES School ID: 450333000902
- Principal: Josh Oxendine
- Teaching staff: 99.80 (on an FTE basis)
- Grades: 9–12
- Enrollment: 1,885 (2023–2024)
- Student to teacher ratio: 18.89
- Colors: Kelly green and white
- Athletics conference: South Carolina High School League Division 5AAAAA Region I
- Nickname: Green Wave
- Website: ehs.pickens.k12.sc.us

Easley High School (EHS) is a public high school in Easley, South Carolina, founded in 1909. It is a part of the School District of Pickens County. The original auditorium is on the National Register of Historic Places.

The campus is along South Carolina Highway 8.

== History ==
The school was built on Russell street in 1909, then relocated to a new building in 1938. The 1909 building, which is noted as an early example of steel-beam construction, is on the National Register of Historic Places. In 2008, construction began on a new building to replace the 1938 facility.

In 1923, the school won the first state championship in livestock judging.

In 1983 it was determined that asbestos levels in the cafeteria posed a serious threat to the health of students and faculty. In 1986 a fund-raising drive raised $186,000 to renovate the auditorium. In 2006, it was reported that the school faced the possibility of staffing problems, with over 40% of existing staff eligible for retirement within five years. In 2010, the school was closed due to the presence of excessive mold., the second time mold issues had come up.

The current school facility, established in a new location, was to open in 2012.

In 2015, due to disruption caused by the display of a confederate flag, the school banned flying flags in the school parking lot. After a student was ticketed for displaying a POW/MIA flag, the school updated the rules to allow the American, state, and school flags.

In 2016 a teacher was fired for presenting sexual content in a literature class, resulting in a student protest. In 2017 the school faced a title 9 investigation for discriminating against a transgender student, as well as firing a teacher for supporting the student. In 2020 the school initiated a unique program to train students in mental health first aid.

=== Integration ===
Before 1969, Black students were not allowed to attend Easley, but went to all-Black Clear View High School, while Easley served white students only. In 1964, the Supreme Court ruled that schools must be integrated. In 1967, The HEW visited Pickens County, and found that they failed to comply with the law. The county school board eventually approved a plan that would close all Black schools, except one elementary school, and would prohibit busing students out of their neighborhood to maintain segregation. In 1974, the school was sued for discriminating against a Black teacher and against Black students.

== Extracurricular activities ==
=== Athletics ===
- In 1937, the school won the state football championship
- In 1962, the school won the state championship in football.
- In 1967, the school won the Class AA football state championship.
- In 1972, the school won another state championship in football
- In 1973 and 1974, the girls won the state basketball championship.
- In 1972, the girls won the state volleyball championship.
- In 1976, the school won the class AAAA championship in baseball.
- In 1996, the girls won the state championship in golf.
- In 1998, the Naval JROTC won unit of the nation.

=== Marching band ===
In 2018, the school won the state championship in marching band.

== Notable alumni ==
- Jane Ballard Dyer, military pilot, politician
- Jay Hagood, football player
- Kimberly Hampton, first US female military pilot to be shot down and killed by hostile fire.
- Stanley Morgan, football player
- Rob Stanifer, baseball player
- Robert Sheriff, Band, Hunter, Singer

== Notable faculty ==
- Chris Long, basketball coach
- John Windham, football coach
