= Kayla Watson =

American singer

Kayla Watson is an American country singer and songwriter from Trinity, NC. Kayla's Great-Grandfather is fiddler Charlie Bowman (Charlie Bowman and the Blue Ridge Ramblers) who performed alongside of Minnie Pearl and others at the Grand Ole Opry in Nashville, TN. Kayla started singing as a young child, performing with the Greensboro Youth Chorus at age 6. She has participated in several local competitions and in 2012 made it to the top 30 finalists in the second season of The X Factor USA. In 2013, she partnered with local lyricist Jeremy Autry, co-founding the group Crossing Avery and releasing first full album "Way We Live".

Recently, Kayla won out of the Share a Coke and Song Superstar Tour competition and performed the National Anthem for NASCAR's NC Education Lottery 200 race.

== Awards ==
- 2010 First place winner of the NATS Singing Competition
- 2013 Contestant/Top30 of X-Factor USA
- 2016 Share a Coke and Song Superstar Tour
