= Rob Stanifer =

American baseball player (born 1972)

- Pitcher
- Born: March 10, 1972 (age 54); Easley, South Carolina, U.S.
- Batted: Right Threw: Right

Professional debut
- MLB: May 3, 1997, for the Florida Marlins
- NPB: April 2, 2002, for the Hiroshima Toyo Carp

Last appearance
- MLB: June 19, 2000, for the Boston Red Sox
- NPB: July 19, 2002, for the Hiroshima Toyo Carp

MLB statistics
- Win–loss record: 3–6
- Earned run average: 5.43
- Strikeouts: 61
- Stats at Baseball Reference

Teams
- Florida Marlins (1997–1998); Boston Red Sox (2000); Hiroshima Toyo Carp (2002)

Career highlights and awards
- World Series champion (1997)

Robert Wayne Stanifer (born March 10, 1972) is an American former professional baseball relief pitcher. He pitched in Major League Baseball (MLB) for the Florida Marlins and Boston Red Sox. He also pitched one season for the Hiroshima Toyo Carp of the Nippon Professional Baseball (NPB). Listed at 6 ft 3 in (1.91 m), 205 lb., he batted and threw right-handed.

== Early life ==
Stanifer grew up in Easley, South Carolina, where he attended Easley High School and played varsity baseball. Stanifer is the only Major League player to attend the high school. Following his senior year at the school, Stanifer elected to play college baseball at Anderson College, now known as Anderson University, a Junior College at the time. In 1993, he played collegiate summer baseball with the Orleans Cardinals of the Cape Cod Baseball League. He was the 1994 National Christian College Athletic Association National Player of the Year while at the school.

== Professional career ==
=== Florida Marlins ===
Stanifer was selected in the 12th round (320th overall) by the Marlins in the 1994 MLB draft out of Anderson University.

Stanifer made his MLB debut in 1997, after spending 3 years in the minor leagues. He appeared in 36 games as a rookie, primarily as a relief pitcher. The Marlins surprised baseball that season, with their run all the way to the World Series, in only their 4th season as a franchise. Stanifer returned to the Marlins the next season, and posted a similar 38 games as a relief pitcher, even recording 1 save on the season.

=== Boston Red Sox ===
Following the 1998 season, Stanifer was traded to the Boston Red Sox on May 31, 1999, in exchange for Brian Partenheimer. He did not make his debut with the Red Sox until the 2000 season and only appeared in 8 games. Stanifer became a free agent after the season.

Stanifer then spent time with the Chicago Cubs and Boston Red Sox, in their minor league teams, for the majority of the 2001.

=== Hiroshima Toyo Carp ===
After the 2001 season he opted to play for the Hiroshima Toyo Carp of the NPB for the 2002 season. He appeared in only 15 games in the NPB, posting a 4.74 ERA over 19 innings pitched.

=== Minor Leagues ===
After the 2002 season, he moved back to the states and spent time in the minor leagues within the Chicago Cubs, Houston Astros, Tampa Bay Devil Rays and Montreal Expos farm systems before retiring from baseball in 2004.

=== Career stats ===
In 82 relief appearances for the Marlins and Red Sox, Stanifer posted a 3–6 record with a 5.43 ERA and two saves, giving up 75 runs (11 unearned) on 119 hits and 42 walks while striking out 61 in 106.0 innings. In 358 minor league appearances, he went 44–35 with a 3.73 ERA and 42 saves, including 184 walks, 494 strikeouts, and 639 2/3 innings of work.

=== Coaching career ===
After retiring from baseball, Stanifer did not stay far away from the game. He initially became a baseball coach at the Largo High School in the town where he currently resides. Achieving moderate success and developing a reputation as a valuable coach in the Tampa Bay Area, this time served as a very good stepping stone into the coaching world for Stanifer. He coached there until the year 2009, until he ultimately made the move to his current position at Northeast High School.

Stanifer brought a new approach to the NEHS team. He used his professional experience to mentor the players and lead them in the right direction. With Northeast St. Petersburg having a strong little league baseball presence, the school's proximity to the area would allow for a steady stream of talent to flow through the school. It was up to Stanifer to hone the talent and bring out the best in the players. The baseball program was already relevant, even having former MLB First round Draft pick, Doug Waechter, being an alumnus, but Stanifer brought consistent success to the school.

Stanifer led the team to multiple district championships, including a run of 4 in a row. In 2017, Stanifer's team made one the schools deepest runs in history, making it all the way to the regional semifinals of the 7A FHSAA State Playoffs.

In 2018, Stanifer was ejected from a semifinal game for repeatedly complaining about the umpiring. "After the ejection, Stanifer continued to yell at the umpires as he was being escorted from the field. Stanifer allegedly called the umpire 'Tubby.' He also said 'Boy, the things I would do if I got you in the parking lot. Ohhh, you would regret it.'" The Florida High School Athletic Association found that Stanifer committed Level 3 egregious unsportsmanlike conduct and suspended him for one year. He is not eligible to coach again until May 2, 2019

== Personal life ==
Stanifer also was a member of the Florida Marlins 1997 World Series Champions. He currently resides in Largo, Florida, where he lives with his wife and their two young daughters. He also works at his own company on top of his job as the head coach of the Northeast High School Varsity Baseball team. He is also now a member of the Anderson University Hall of Fame.
