= National Stock Car Racing Association =

Defunct sanctioning body for stock car racing

- Sport: Stock car racing
- Category: Auto racing
- Jurisdiction: United States
- Abbreviation: NSCRA
- Founded: 1946
- Headquarters: Atlanta, Georgia, U.S.
- President: Weyman Milam
- Other key staff: Bruton Smith
- Closure date: 1951

The National Stock Car Racing Association (NSRA/NSCRA) was a sanctioning body for stock car racing that operated in the Southeastern United States during the late 1940s and early 1950s. Competing against several other sanctioning bodies, including NASCAR, NSCRA was considered to be the most significant challenge to NASCAR's dominance of the sport; however it proved incapable of competing with the larger sanction, and closed down midway through the 1951 racing season.

== History ==
Founded in 1946 in Atlanta, Georgia by Sam Nunis and Weyman Milam, the NSCRA was one of many small sanctioning bodies that appeared following the end of World War II to promote the fledgling sport of stock car racing. Participating, along with the U.S. Stock Car Drivers Association and Bill France's National Championship Stock Car Circuit, in a decision to declare a consensus national champion for stock cars in 1946, it remained a largely informal group, operating as a sanction for modified stock car racing, until O. Bruton Smith of Charlotte, North Carolina assumed responsibility for the group in 1948.

Smith announced that the sanction would operate a "Strictly Stock" championship starting in 1949; he offered lucrative purse money in an attempt to cherry-pick the stars of France's NASCAR, which had been founded in 1947 to replace the NCSCC and was running its first modified season in 1948. (Note: "National Stock Car Racing Association" had actually been the preferred name selected for the new sanctioning body created by France in 1947 at the Streamline Hotel in Daytona Beach, Florida; Red Vogt pointed out that the name was already in use, suggesting "National Association for Stock Car Auto Racing" as an alternative, which was accepted.) In direct competition, France announced his own Strictly Stock race, running it at Charlotte Speedway in June 1949 - a direct poke in the eye to Smith and NSCRA, as Charlotte was Smith's hometown.

The NSCRA Strictly Stock Championship ran for two years, with Ed Samples, a former moonshiner, winning the series title in 1949; Buddy Shuman, who had won the NSCRA modified title in 1948, took the series' stock car championship trophy in 1950.

In late 1950, seeing as how the sport was still on a shaky basis and could not support two major sanctioning bodies, Smith and France agreed in principle to merge their respective organizations into a single, unified promotional body for the sport. However, Smith was drafted in January 1951 to fight in the Korean War as a paratrooper; in his absence, NSCRA's management, dominated by drivers, proved incapable of keeping the organization afloat amongst internal disputes, and Milam was forced to close down the sanctioning body during the summer of 1951. Samples was leading the NSCRA's point standings at the time of the closure. The circuit's premier drivers, such as Cotton Owens, and tracks, such as Lakewood Speedway, joined NASCAR following NSCRA's closure.
