= Easley Mill =

- U.S. National Register of Historic Places
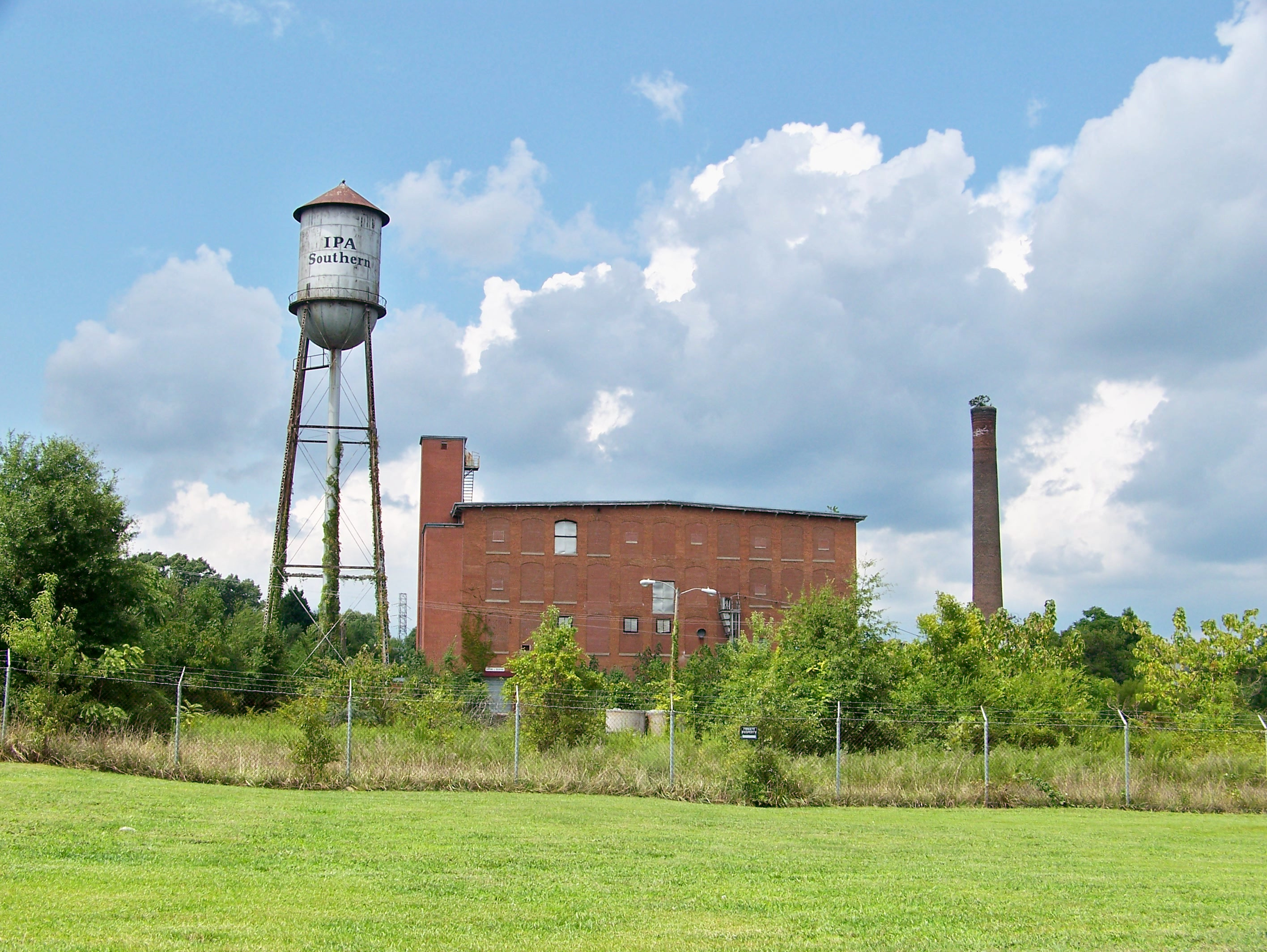

- Location within South Carolina Location within the United States
- Location: 601 South 5th Street, Easley, South Carolina
- Coordinates: 34°49′27″N 82°36′28″W
- Built: 1900
- Architect: Lockwood, Greene & Co.
- NRHP reference No.: 09000818
- Added to NRHP: September 23, 2013

Easley Mill is a historic mill complex in Easley, South Carolina. The mill was the first of three built in Easley between 1899 and 1910. The main building was completed in 1900, and is a four-story brick structure designed by preeminent mill architects Lockwood, Greene & Co. It was built during a boom in the textile industry across the Southern United States; more than 70 mills were opened in South Carolina alone between 1895 and 1903. The mill met with immediate success, including large shipments for export to China. By 1907, the mill contained over 37,000 spindles and 1,000 looms, and employed 500. It was sold to Woodside Mills of Greenville in 1920, and to Dan River, Inc. in 1956, who operated the mill until 1990. The mill has a shallow-pitched hip roof with bracketed eaves. Most of the arched window openings have been bricked over. Other structures on the site include a one-story office building, a warehouse, smokestack, an ice house, water tower, and monument to the mill's founder, John Mattison Geer. The mill was listed on the National Register of Historic Places in 2013. A proposal was made to convert the building to apartments in 2019.
