= Easley High School Auditorium =

- U.S. National Register of Historic Places
- Building Restored for Use as Residential Condominiums - 2007

- Location within South Carolina Location within the United States
- Location: 112 Russell Street, Easley, South Carolina
- Coordinates: 34°49′48″N 82°36′0″W
- Built: 1909
- Architect: Cunningham, Frank H. & Joseph G.; Gallivan Co.
- Architectural style: Renaissance Revival
- NRHP reference No.: 98001646
- Added to NRHP: January 21, 1999

Easley High School Auditorium in the 1920s

By the 1990s, severe damage caused the building to be recognized as one of the most-endangered historical properties in South Carolina

Easley High School Auditorium is a historic building built in 1909 in Easley, South Carolina and now on the National Register of Historic Places. It is historically significant for its long association with education and civic life in Easley in the first half of the 20th century. The building served as Easley's first and only high school from 1909 to 1940 and was central to the early experience and training of almost every local resident of that period.

== Architecture ==
Architecturally, the load-bearing masonry building in the Renaissance Revival style is significant for its early efforts to introduce steel trusses into traditional masonry-bearing wall and heavy timber construction. It has also been noted as an outstanding early example of the work of architects Frank H. and Joseph G. Cunningham. The building illustrates the early use of steel trusses to provide a clear-span auditorium with 18-foot ceilings. At the time of construction, use of steel trusses was still in the experimental phase. The design of the building is an early example of “the gradual replacement of load-bearing masonry and heavy timber structures with steel frame construction.” The building has 86 tall windows with segmental arches, laid out like those in many textile mills in the region.

== Later Use ==
When the building opened in the fall of 1909, its classrooms allowed the seventh through tenth grades to have their own rooms for the first time (an eleventh grade was added in the 1920-21 school year. The school had outgrown the facility by 1938 and a new building was constructed on a different site in 1939-40. Following completion of the new school building, the auditorium was occupied by a shirt manufacturer until 1964.

From that time until its listing on the National Register, the building went through various periods of vacancy and occupation by a local furniture store for limited storage use.

== Recent Restoration ==
The building had fallen into disrepair when the Easley Chamber of Commerce applied for its recognition as one of the most-endangered properties in the state. Occupants of the building following its use as a school had torn out interior classroom walls, a portion of the roof had been destroyed as the result of wind damage from a 1998 storm (this was replaced with temporary corrugated metal sheets), and metal panels had been installed over many windows to prevent water damage. All but one original chimney as well as an entry porch on the building's south side had been removed, "virtually all windows and doors" and much of the plaster work were "severely deteriorated".

Following a 1997 study that identified the building as a key ingredient in downtown Easley's revitalization, the town engaged in a period of planning on how to return it to a place of prominence within the community. In the early 2000s the building was rehabilitated and restored to private use as residential condominiums.

The building stands at 112 Russell Street and was placed on the National Register of Historic Places in 1999. The South Carolina Department of Archives and History has additional pictures and information, as well as the NRHP nomination document.
