= Upper South Carolina State Fair =

Country fair in South Carolina

Coordinates: 34.8333°N 82.5002°W

The Upper SC State Fair is a country fair that has been held annually from 1964 to 2019, paused into 2020 due to the COVID-19 pandemic, and resuming in 2021 at the Greenville-Pickens Speedway between Greenville, South Carolina and Easley, South Carolina. It features many different types of rides, food, games, and entertainment.

The first spring fair was held in 2023.

The Upper SC State Fair has been known to bring top national acts to the fair over the years and recently has opened their stages to local acts. Some acts featured at the Upper SC State Fair have been: Lynyrd Skynyrd, 38 Special, Silvertide, Charlie Daniels and Grand Funk Railroad.
