= Sam Nunis =

American auto racing promoter

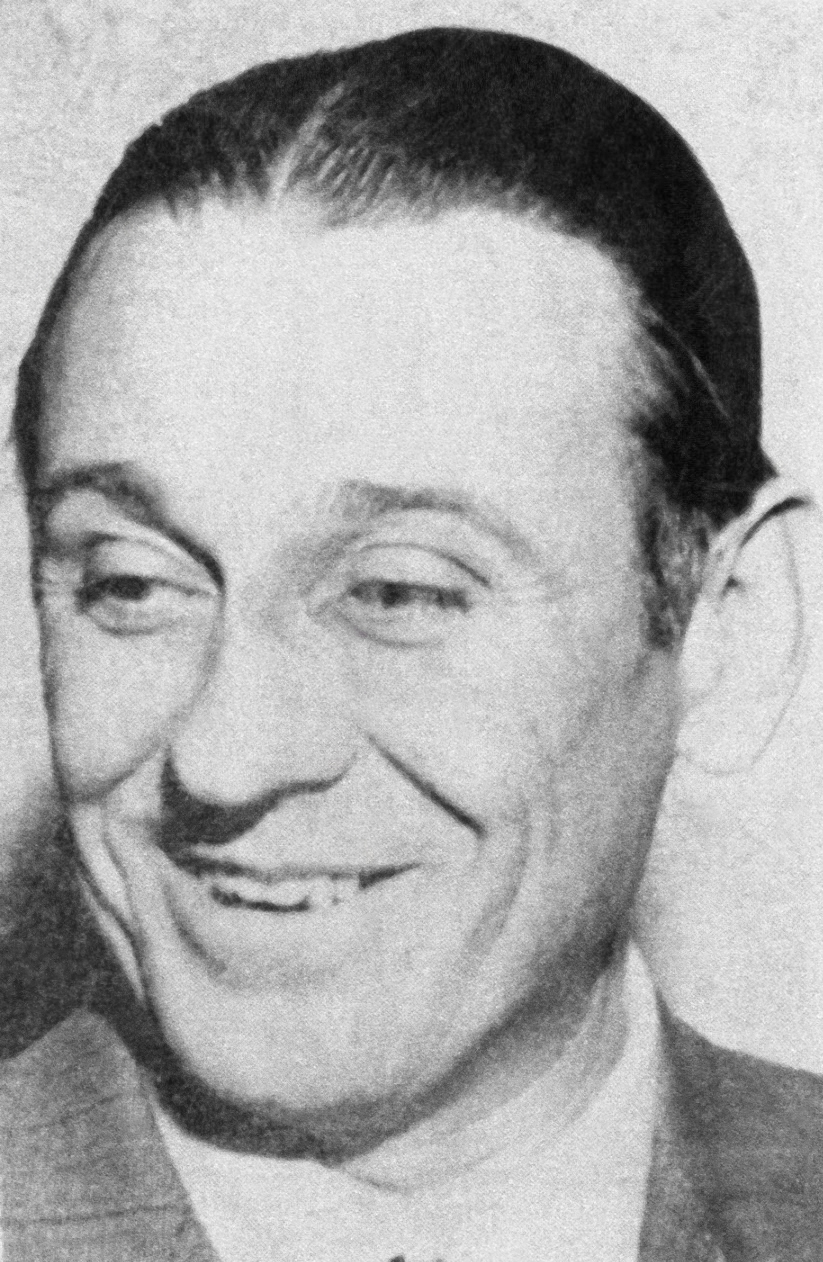
- Nunis, circa 1957
- Born: Floyd Sam Nunis; December 16, 1903
- Died: February 1, 1980 (aged 76)

Floyd Sam Nunis (December 16, 1903 – February 1, 1980) was a pioneering figure in American stock car racing, being involved in both the American Automobile Association and the National Stock Car Racing Association.

== Career ==
Nunis worked with the American Automobile Association to promote stock car racing in the late 1940s, encouraging the group to promote the sport, which they had previously written off, in addition to AAA's traditional sanctioning of IndyCar races. He primarily promoted races at Lakewood Speedway near Atlanta in Georgia, both under AAA sanction and under the aegis of the National Stock Car Racing Association, which he co-operated along with Weyman Milam between 1946 and 1951.
