= Clear View High School (South Carolina) =

Segregated school in South Carolina, US

Coordinates: 34.8343°N 82.6087°W

- Pickens County, South Carolina

Information
- Closed: 1969

Clear View High School was a segregated all-black high school for Black Students in Pickens County, South Carolina. It was closed in 1969 and the students redirected to Easley High School when Federal courts mandated that public schools must be integrated. Many Black residents strongly objected to the Closure of Clear View, and U.S. Representative William Jennings Bryan Dorn took up the cause with the HEW. The location later became known as the J.T. Simpson Alternative school and is now the site of the Pickens County Head Start program and the Dream Center.

== History ==
In 1963, the student enrollment in grades 8-12 was 440.

=== Integration ===
In 1967, civil rights officials from the HEW visited Pickens County, and announced $700,000 in Federal Funds would be withheld until the school system came up with an acceptable integration plan. Busing students outside their neighborhood to maintain segregation was specifically prohibited. The all-white school board came up with a plan that would immediately close all of the Black schools in the county except one. Simpson Elementary, which was adjacent to Clear View was to be closed the next year and converted to a community center. While the board of trustees claimed the decision to close the Black schools was forced on them by the HEW, local activist R.D. Cox obtained a letter from the secretary of the HEW that stated otherwise.
