= Easley, South Carolina =

Easley
- City
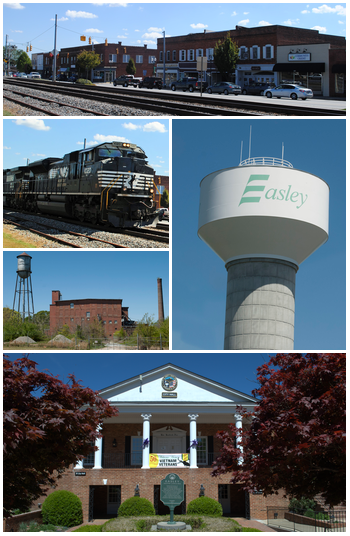
- Top, left to right: Downtown Easley, Norfolk Southern Railway, Easley Mill, Easley water tower, Easley City Hall

- Seal
- Motto: "Time Well Spent"
- Location of Easley in South Carolina
- Coordinates: 34°49′24″N 82°36′25″W
- Country: United States
- State: South Carolina
- Counties: Pickens, partially Anderson
- Established: 1874
- Incorporated: 1901

Government
  - Mayor: Lisa Talbert

Area
  - Total: 13.07 sq mi (33.86 km^{2})
  - Land: 13.05 sq mi (33.80 km^{2})
  - Water: 0.019 sq mi (0.05 km^{2})
- Elevation: 1,011 ft (308 m)

Population (2020)
  - Total: 22,921
  - Density: 1,756.3/sq mi (678.11/km^{2})
- Time zone: UTC−5 (Eastern (EST))
  - Summer (DST): UTC−4 (EDT)
- ZIP codes: 29640-29642
- Area codes: 864, 821
- FIPS code: 45-21985
- GNIS feature ID: 2403530
- Website: cityofeasley.com

Easley is a city in Pickens County (with parts extending into Anderson County) in the U.S. state of South Carolina. As of the 2020 census, Easley had a population of 22,921.

In 2001, Easley hosted the Big League World Series for the first time, and continued to host the tournament annually until it was disbanded in 2016. In 2017, the Senior League World Series moved to Easley as the host for the annual tournament.

The Upper South Carolina State Fair was located in Easley and was held annually in early September. The Upper South Carolina State Fair is no longer held in Easley, as the Greenville-Pickens Speedway, which hosted the fair, is being developed into an industrial park as of 2023.

== History ==
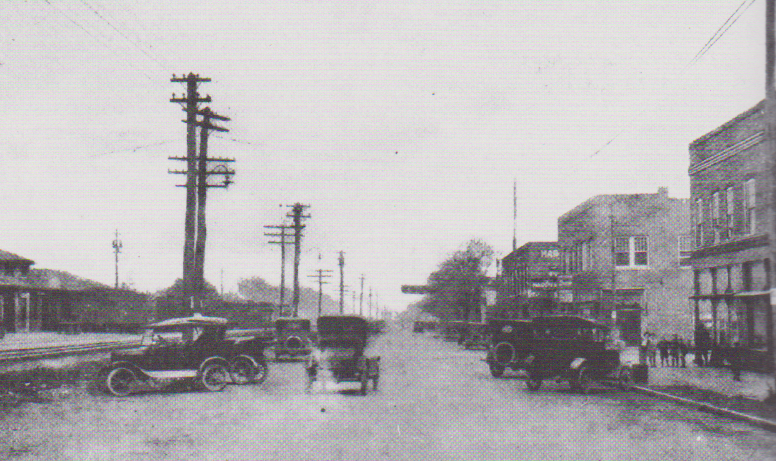
Downtown Easley in early 1900s

In 1791, Washington District was established by the state legislature out of the former Cherokee territory. Rockville was also created in 1791 but changed to Pickensville in 1792. Pickensville became the district seat of Washington District which was then composed of Greenville and Pendleton Counties. In 1798, Washington District was divided into Greenville and Pendleton Districts. In 1828, Pendleton District was divided further with the lower portion becoming Anderson County and the upper becoming Pickens County named after Andrew Pickens.

Col. Robert Elliott Holcombe became a co-founder of the town by starting off as a farmer and timber mill owner in the area. His farming ventures enabled him to establish the storeroom in 1845 as the first business in the area. The namesake of the town was William King Easley. Easley was born in Pickens County, South Carolina in 1825. Easley and four others from Greenville represented the Greenville area in the South Carolina Secession Convention. When the American Civil War erupted, Easley raised a company of cavalry from Greenville and Pickens counties. During the war, Easley served as a major in the Confederate Army.

After the civil war, Easley became a local attorney and persuaded the Atlanta and Charlotte Air Line Railway to be established through Pickensville by raising $100,000 to invest in the railroad. Holcombe was considered to be the first citizen of Easley, building the first dwelling and train depot in the town from his family's lumber mill. Holcombe became the first mayor of the town and was also the first agent of the train depot. The town of Easley was chartered in 1873. At the time, the consensus was that it should be named Holcombe or Holcombetown, but Col. Holcombe said that he didn't think Holcombe was a very attractive name and that Easley sounded better. The Pickensville Post Office became Easley Post Office in 1875. The railroad transformed Easley into an industrious and thriving textile town. The Easley Textile Company, later known as Swirl Inc., came to Easley in 1953. The construction of U.S. Route 123 helped establish retail and new business in Easley. On April 25, 1951, a department store was on fire threatening many buildings in downtown Easley but the quick response of the fire department extinguished the fire.

In 1968, NASCAR driver Curtis Turner caused a telephone outage in Easley while landing his airplane on the town's main street.

In 2020, longtime fire chief Butch Womack was elected mayor. However, in 2023, Lisa Talbert challenged his reelection, becoming Easley's first female mayor when she defeated him.

== Geography ==
Easley is located in southeastern Pickens County 12 miles (19 km) west of the center of Greenville.

According to the United States Census Bureau, the city has a total area of 12.3 square miles (31.8 km^{2}), of which 12.2 square miles (31.7 km^{2}) is land and 0.039 square miles (0.1 km^{2}), or 0.17%, is water.

== Demographics ==
Historical population
Census	Pop.	Note	%±
1880	327		—
1890	421		28.7%
1900	903		114.5%
1910	2,983		230.3%
1920	3,568		19.6%
1930	4,886		36.9%
1940	5,183		6.1%
1950	6,316		21.9%
1960	8,283		31.1%
1970	11,175		34.9%
1980	14,264		27.6%
1990	15,195		6.5%
2000	17,754		16.8%
2010	19,993		12.6%
2020	22,921		14.6%
2025 (est.)	27,319	▲	19.2%
U.S. Decennial Census

=== 2020 census ===
As of the 2020 census, Easley had a population of 22,921 and 5,571 families. The median age was 42.1 years. 21.0% of residents were under the age of 18 and 20.9% of residents were 65 years of age or older. For every 100 females there were 89.1 males, and for every 100 females age 18 and over there were 84.9 males age 18 and over.

99.8% of residents lived in urban areas, while 0.2% lived in rural areas.

As of 2023, of the 22,921 people living in the municipality of Easley, 22,888 live in Pickens County and 33 live in Anderson County.

There were 9,750 households in Easley, of which 27.7% had children under the age of 18 living in them. Of all households, 44.8% were married-couple households, 17.0% were households with a male householder and no spouse or partner present, and 32.4% were households with a female householder and no spouse or partner present. About 31.5% of all households were made up of individuals and 15.2% had someone living alone who was 65 years of age or older.

There were 10,413 housing units, of which 6.4% were vacant. The homeowner vacancy rate was 1.9% and the rental vacancy rate was 6.1%.

Racial composition as of the 2020 census
Race	Number	Percent
White	17,626	76.9%
Black or African American	2,692	11.7%
American Indian and Alaska Native	59	0.3%
Asian	269	1.2%
Native Hawaiian and Other Pacific Islander	5	0.0%
Some other race	924	4.0%
Two or more races	1,346	5.9%
Hispanic or Latino (of any race)	1,555	6.8%

=== 2000 census ===
As of the census of 2000, there were 17,754 people, 7,227 households, and 5,058 families residing in the city. The population density was 1,668.8 inhabitants per square mile (644.3/km^{2}). There were 7,932 housing units at an average density of 745.6 per square mile (287.9/km^{2}). The racial makeup of the city was 85.35% White, 11.81% African American, 0.14% Native American, 0.52% Asian, 0.03% Pacific Islander, 1.25% from other races, and 0.90% from two or more races. Hispanic or Latino of any race were 2.82% of the population.

There were 7,227 households, out of which 30.6% had children under the age of 18 living with them, 53.9% were married couples living together, 12.3% had a female householder with no husband present, and 30.0% were non-families. 25.7% of all households were made up of individuals, and 11.0% had someone living alone who was 65 years of age or older. The average household size was 2.43 and the average family size was 2.90.

In the city, the population was spread out, with 23.5% under the age of 18, 8.5% from 18 to 24, 29.7% from 25 to 44, 23.6% from 45 to 64, and 14.7% who were 65 years of age or older. The median age was 37 years. For every 100 females, there were 92.1 males. For every 100 females age 18 and over, there were 88.6 males.

The median income for a household in the city was $38,204, and the median income for a family was $47,867. Males had a median income of $35,399 versus $25,443 for females. The per capita income for the city was $20,965. About 8.4% of families and 10.9% of the population were below the poverty line, including 12.2% of those under age 18 and 11.9% of those age 65 or over.

== Military ==
=== National Guard ===
Battery B, 2nd Battalion, 263rd Army Air Missile Defense Command, is based at the Easley National Guard Armory in Easley.

=== Recruiting ===
- U.S. Army Recruiting Substation
- U.S. Marine Corps Recruiting Substation

=== JROTC ===
- Easley High School Navy JROTC Battalion

Awarded Distinguished Unit 20 consecutive years in a row by NJROTC Area 6.

== Education ==
Public school services are provided to the Pickens County portion of Easley by the School District of Pickens County. Seven of the district's schools provide public education to the children of Easley.

- Easley High School (Grades: 9–12)
- R.H. Gettys Middle School (Grades: 6–8)
- West End Elementary School (Grades: K4-5)
- Forest Acres Elementary School (Grades:K4-5)
- East End Elementary School (Grades: K4-5)
- Crosswell Elementary School (Grades: K4-5)
- McKissick Elementary School (Grades: K4-5)

The Anderson County portion of Easley is in the Anderson School District 1.

Most preschools in the city are private and provided by churches. There are also several private schools, such as Easley Christian School.

Tri-County Technical College maintains a campus in Easley. Clemson University is also located adjacent to nearby Clemson. Southern Wesleyan University is located in nearby Central, Greenville Technical College and Furman University are located nearby in Greenville.

Easley has a public library, a branch of the Pickens County Library System.

== Notable people ==
- Kyle Benjamin, NASCAR race car driver
- Shannon Forrest, Country-Rock drummer. Drummer for rock group Toto.
- E. Allison Hagood, Professor of Psychology and author of Your Baby's Best Shot
- Kimberly Hampton, U.S. Army captain, first female military pilot to be killed by hostile fire
- Wes Knight, Major League Soccer player for the Vancouver Whitecaps FC
- Stanley Morgan, National Football League player for the New England Patriots
- Rob Stanifer, Former Major League Baseball player for three teams. World Series Champion with the Florida Marlins.
- Jasmine Twitty, former Associate Judge for the Easley Municipal Court
- Kayla Watson, Producer of the Good Mythical Morning YouTube Show
