= Streamline Hotel =

Hotel in Daytona Beach, Florida

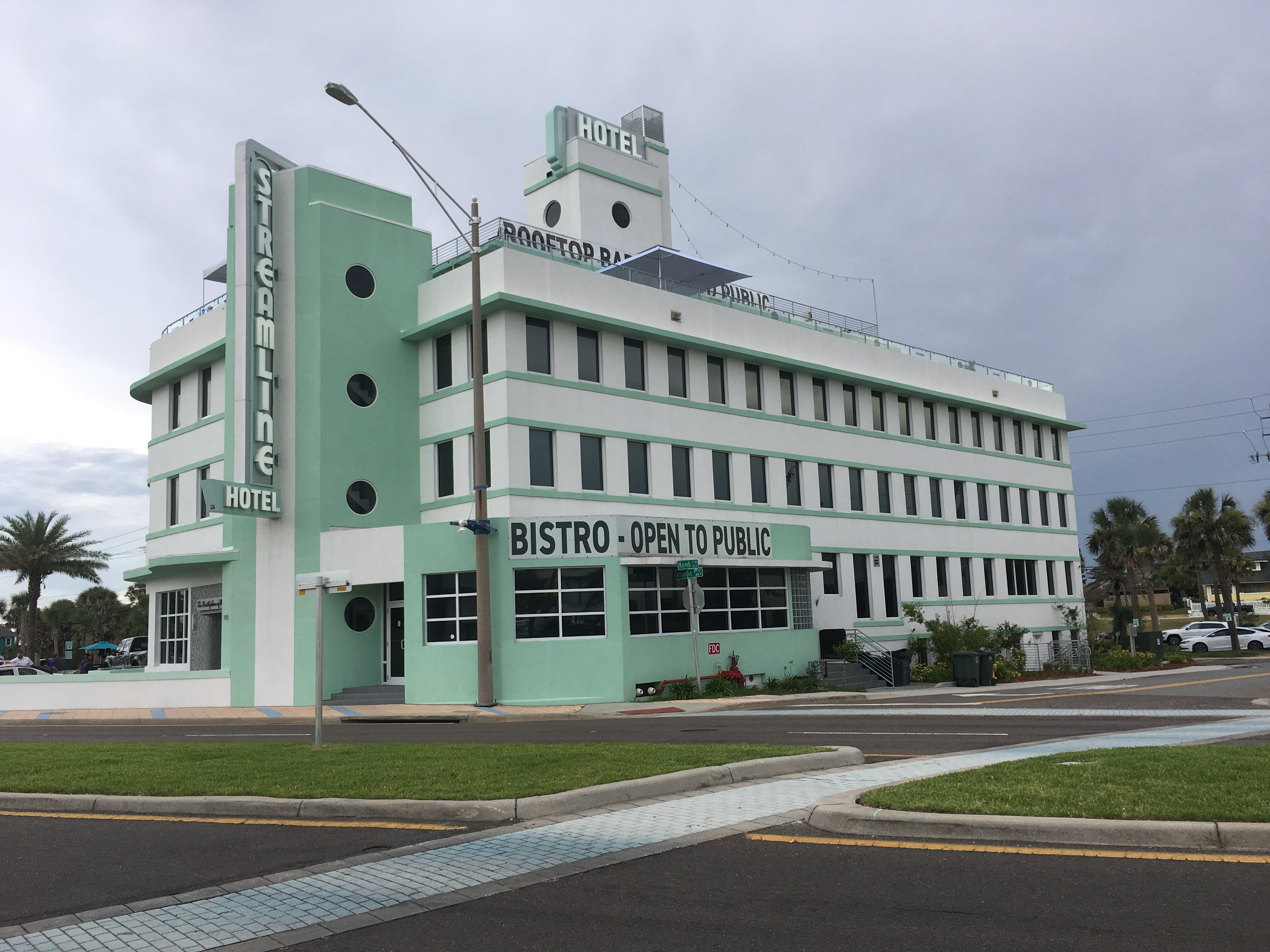
- Streamline Hotel in July 2018

General information
- Location: Daytona Beach, Florida 32118, 140 S. Atlantic Ave
- Coordinates: 29.2235°N 81.0067°W
- Opening: 1941
- Owner: Eddie Hennessy

Technical details
- Floor count: 4

Other information
- Number of rooms: 47
- Number of bars: 2
- Parking: Yes

Website
- Official website

The Streamline Hotel is a hotel located in Daytona Beach, Florida. Opened in 1941, it is the recognized birthplace of the National Association for Stock Car Auto Racing (NASCAR).

== NASCAR ==
NASCAR founder Bill France Sr. and numerous drivers, officials, and promoters gathered in the Ebony Club's rooftop hotel bar on December 14, 1947. The meeting concerned various issues such as drivers failing to get paid due to promoters leaving races with the gate receipts before they ended, along with the lack of consistent rules. After 69 days of conversations and ideas, the meeting adjourned on February 21, 1948 with the formation of the National Stock Car Racing Association (NSCRA), but was later renamed to NASCAR after it turned out that there was another sanctioning body by that name. NASCAR's first offices were located three blocks away from the hotel at the Selden Bank Building. Daytona International Speedway is located six miles (9.7 km) west of the hotel.

== Features ==
The mint green-painted 'Streamline Moderne'-style hotel opened in 1940. It is a four-story building located on the west side of State Road A1A, which was once used as part of the Daytona Beach and Road Course (another part being the beach itself). A plaque located outside the building proclaims that the hotel is the first building in Daytona Beach to be fireproof, and was also considered as the city's first bomb shelter. The Streamline Hotel also is the oldest standing hotel in Daytona Beach.

== Decay and restoration efforts ==
The hotel had grown more decrepit through the years, showing rust stained walls and sun damage. A police chief once called the building a "den of iniquity." However, a plaque stated that the building was restored by owner Eric G. Doyle. In 2006, Frank Heckman, chairman of the Main Street-South Atlantic Avenue Redevelopment Board stated that Daytona Beach expressed interest in purchasing the hotel, potentially converting the building to a NASCAR museum and tourist attraction. $400,000 had reportedly appeared on the board's budget under the "historic preservation" category, which was possibly intended to help restore the hotel. However, Daytona Beach's finance director denied any knowledge of the funds. The building has also been used as a youth hostel and a retirement home owned by an evangelist who claimed to have ministered Elvis Presley. In 2011, Zetta Baker, one of the founders of the Victory Lane Racing Association (VLRA), an organization that helps racing families in need, announced at the group's annual meeting that they would purchase the building; however, the deal fell through. In 2014, it was announced that the hotel had been sold to local businessman Eddie Hennessy, who planned to renovate it into a "South Beach, art-deco style boutique hotel". As part of this effort, the hotel was featured on an October 2014 episode of Hotel Impossible. The hotel was renovated and reopened in May 2017. The renovation ended up costing $6 million and included completely gutting the building. The Streamline Hotel went to online auction in April 2019 after Hennessy decided to exit the hotel business. Two weeks after the hotel was taken off the auction block, it was announced the hotel was no longer for sale.
