= NASCAR =

American automobile racing company

National Association for Stock Car Auto Racing, LLC
- Sport: Auto racing
- Category: Stock car racing Sports car racing (IMSA)
- Abbreviation: NASCAR
- Founded: February 21, 1948; 78 years ago
- Affiliation: ACCUS-FIA
- Headquarters: Daytona Beach, Florida, U.S. (main); Charlotte, North Carolina, U.S. Concord, North Carolina, U.S.
- Chairman: Jim France
- CEO: Steve O'Donnell

Official website
- nascar.com
- Other key staff: Mike Helton (Vice Chair); Lesa France Kennedy (Vice Chair); Elton Sawyer (SVP, Competition); Ben Kennedy (COO)

The National Association for Stock Car Auto Racing, LLC (NASCAR) (Note: /ˈnæs.kɑːr/) is an American auto racing sanctioning and operating company that is best known for stock car racing. It is considered to be one of the top-ranked motorsports organizations in the world and is one of the largest spectator sports leagues in America. The privately owned company was founded by Bill France Sr. in 1948. The company is headquartered in Daytona Beach, Florida. Each year, NASCAR sanctions over 1,500 races at over 100 tracks in 48 US states, as well as in Canada, Mexico, Brazil, and Europe.

NASCAR, and stock car racing as a whole, traces its roots back to moonshine runners during Prohibition, who grew to compete against each other in a show of pride. In 1935, Bill France Sr. established races in Daytona Beach, with the hope that people would come to watch races and that racers would race for him, as other organizers tended to fleece the winners of their payouts. This was a success, and the series was founded in 1948. Races were held in several divisions, which eventually morphed into what is the "ladder": the Cup Series at the top, the O'Reilly Auto Parts Series second, and the Truck Series third, with smaller series spread out below. Chevrolet, Ford, and Toyota compete in each series. RAM also competes in the Truck Series.

The vast majority of NASCAR drivers are American, but drivers from Canada, Mexico, Europe, Australasia, and other places have competed. All Cup Series races are held in the United States and Mexico. There are 36 points-paying races in a season, along with the pre-season Clash and mid-season All-Star race. NASCAR runs races primarily on ovals, including superspeedways, short tracks, and previously dirt tracks, but also road courses and street circuits.

Richard Petty holds the Cup Series wins record with 200. He is tied with Dale Earnhardt and Jimmie Johnson for the championship record, with seven each. Entering the 2026 season, Kyle Larson is the defending Cup Series champion.

== History ==
=== Early stock car racing ===
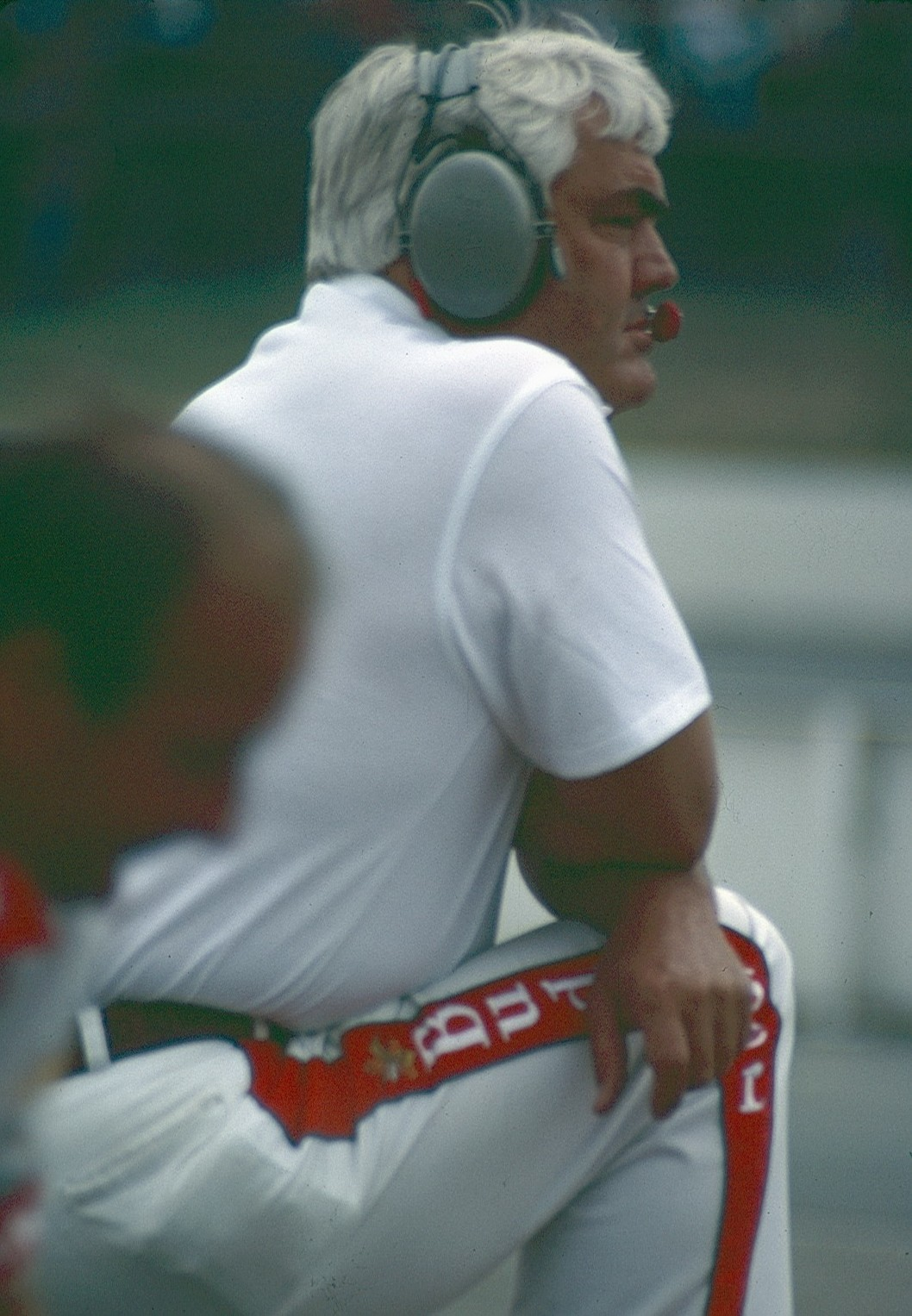
1985 photo of Junior Johnson, 1950s NASCAR driver who began as a bootlegging driver from Wilkes County, North Carolina

In the 1920s and 1930s, Daytona Beach supplanted France and Belgium as the preferred location for world land speed records. After a historic race between Ransom Olds and Alexander Winton in 1903, 15 records were set on what became the Daytona Beach Road Course between 1905 and 1935. Daytona Beach had become synonymous with fast cars in 1936. Drivers raced on a 4.1-mile (6.6 km) course, consisting of a 1.5–2.0-mile (2.4–3.2 km) stretch of beach as one straightaway, and a narrow blacktop beachfront highway, State Road A1A, as the other. The two straights were connected by two tight, deeply rutted and sand covered turns at each end.

Stock car racing in the United States has its origins in bootlegging during Prohibition, when drivers ran bootleg whiskey made primarily in the Appalachian region of the United States. Bootleggers needed to distribute their illicit products, and they typically used small, fast vehicles to better evade the police. Many of the drivers would modify their cars for speed and handling, as well as increased cargo capacity.

The repeal of Prohibition in 1933 dried up some of their business, but by then the people of the American South had developed a taste for moonshine, and a number of the drivers continued "runnin' shine", this time evading the revenue agents also known as "revenuers" who were attempting to tax their operations. The cars continued to improve, and by the late 1940s, races featuring these cars were being run for pride and profit. These races were popular entertainment in the rural Southern United States, and they are most closely associated with the Wilkes County region of North Carolina. Most races in those days were of modified cars. Street vehicles were lightened and reinforced.

=== Significant people ===
==== Bill France Sr. ====
Mechanic Bill France Sr. moved to Daytona Beach, Florida, from Washington, D.C., in 1935 to escape the Great Depression. He was familiar with the history of the area from the land speed record attempts. France entered the 1936 Daytona event, finishing fifth. He took over running the course in 1938. He promoted a few races before World War II.

France believed people would enjoy watching stock cars race. Drivers were frequently victimized by unscrupulous promoters who would leave events with all the money before drivers were paid. On December 14, 1947, France began talks with other influential racers and promoters at the Ebony Bar at the Streamline Hotel in Daytona Beach, Florida, that ended with the formation of NASCAR on February 21, 1948.

==== Erwin "Cannonball" Baker ====
The first Commissioner of NASCAR was Erwin "Cannonball" Baker, a former stock car, motorcycle, and open-wheel racer who competed in the Indianapolis 500 and set over one hundred land speed records. Baker earned most of his fame for his transcontinental speed runs and would prove a car's worth by driving it from New York to Los Angeles. After his death, the famous transcontinental race the "Cannonball Run" and the film that was inspired by it were both named in his honor. Baker is enshrined in the Automotive Hall of Fame, the Motorcycle Hall of Fame, and the Indianapolis Motor Speedway Hall of Fame. This level of honor and success in each diverse racing association earned Baker the title of "King of the Road".

==== Bob "Barky" Barkhimer ====
In the early 1950s, the United States Navy stationed Bill France Jr. at the Moffett Federal Airfield in northern California. His father asked him to look up Bob Barkhimer in San Jose, California. Barkhimer was a star of midget car racing from the World War II era, and later ran about 22 different speedways as the head of the California Stock Car Racing Association. Young Bill developed a relationship with Bob Barkhimer and his partner, Margo Burke. He went to events with them, stayed weekends with them and generally became very familiar with racing on the west coast. "Barky", as he was called by his friends, journeyed to Daytona Beach and met with Bill France Sr. In the spring of 1954, NASCAR became a stock car sanctioning body on the Pacific Coast under Barky.

==== Wendell Scott ====
Wendell Scott was the first African-American to win a race in the Grand National Series, NASCAR's highest level. He was posthumously inducted into the NASCAR Hall of Fame in Charlotte, North Carolina, January 30, 2015.

Logo used from 1976 to 2016

=== Founding ===
On March 8, 1936, a collection of drivers gathered at Daytona Beach, Florida. The drivers brought coupes, hardtops, convertibles, and sports cars to compete in an event to determine the fastest cars, and best drivers. Throughout the race, the heavier cars got bogged down in the sand, while the lightweight Fords navigated the ruts of the course, eventually claiming the top 6 finishes for the race. Of the 27 cars that started the event, only 10 managed to survive the ordeal, as officials halted the event 10 miles (16 km) short of the scheduled 250-mile (400 km) distance. Driver Milt Marion was declared the winner, and a young Bill France placed 5th at the end of the day.

By early 1947, Bill France saw the potential for a unified series of racing competitors. France announced the foundation of the "National Championship Stock Car Circuit", otherwise known as NCSCC. France approached the American Automobile Association, or AAA, in hopes of obtaining financial backing for the venture. When the AAA declined support of the venture, France proceeded to announce a set of rules and awards for the NCSCC. France declared that the winner of the 1947 NCSCC season would receive $1,000 (equivalent to $14,400 in 2025) and a trophy. The season began in January 1947 at the Daytona Beach track and concluded in Jacksonville that December. Nearly 40 events were held during the season, and attendance often exceeded the venue's capacity. The competitors were paid as promised. Fonty Flock was declared the champion after winning 7 events of the 24 that he entered. Bill France delivered the prize money and 4-foot-high trophy to Flock at the end of the season, along with $3,000 in prize money (equivalent to $43,300 in 2025) to other drivers who competed throughout the season.

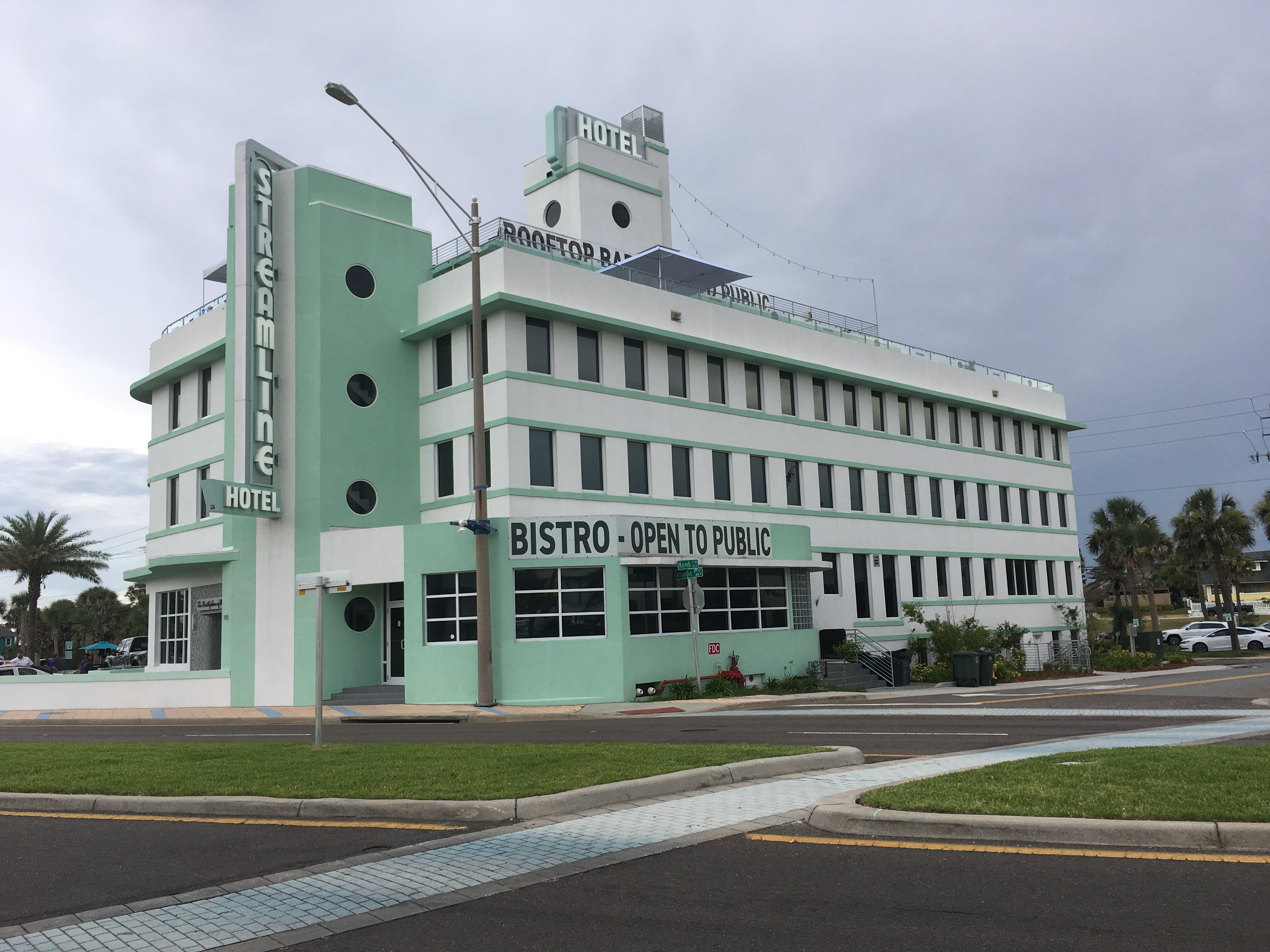
The Streamline Hotel in Daytona Beach, Florida, where NASCAR was founded

At the end of the 1947 season, Bill France announced that there would be a series of meetings held at the Streamline Hotel in Daytona Beach beginning on December 14, 1947. At 1:00 pm, France called to order the 35 men who represented the NCSCC on the top floor of the hotel. The meeting was the first of four seminars in which France would outline his vision of an organized group of race car drivers. The name originally chosen for the series was "National Stock Car Racing Association"; when it was pointed out that that name was already in use by a rival sanctioning body, "National Association for Stock Car Auto Racing", proposed by mechanic Red Vogt, was selected as the organization's name.

NASCAR was founded by Bill France on February 21, 1948, with the help of several other drivers. The original plans for NASCAR included three distinct divisions: modified, roadster, and strictly stock. The roadster division was quickly abandoned, while the modified division now operates as the NASCAR Whelen Modified Tour. The strictly stock division was put on hold as American automobile manufacturers were unable to produce family sedans quickly enough to meet post-war demand. The 1948 schedule featured 52 modified dirt track races. NASCAR hosted its first event at Daytona Beach on February 15, 1948. Red Byron beat Marshall Teague in the modified division race. Byron won the 1948 national championship. The strictly stock division debuted with a 20-mile (32 km) exhibition in February 1949 near Miami.

The first NASCAR Strictly Stock Series race was held at Charlotte Speedway (distinct from the modern Charlotte Motor Speedway) on June 19, 1949. Jim Roper was the race winner due to Glenn Dunaway disqualification following the discovery of his altered rear springs. Initially, the cars raced with virtually no modifications on the factory models. The Strictly Stock Series was renamed the Grand National Series in 1950. Modifications for both safety and performance were allowed in time, and by the mid-1960s, the vehicles were purpose-built race cars with a stock-appearing body.

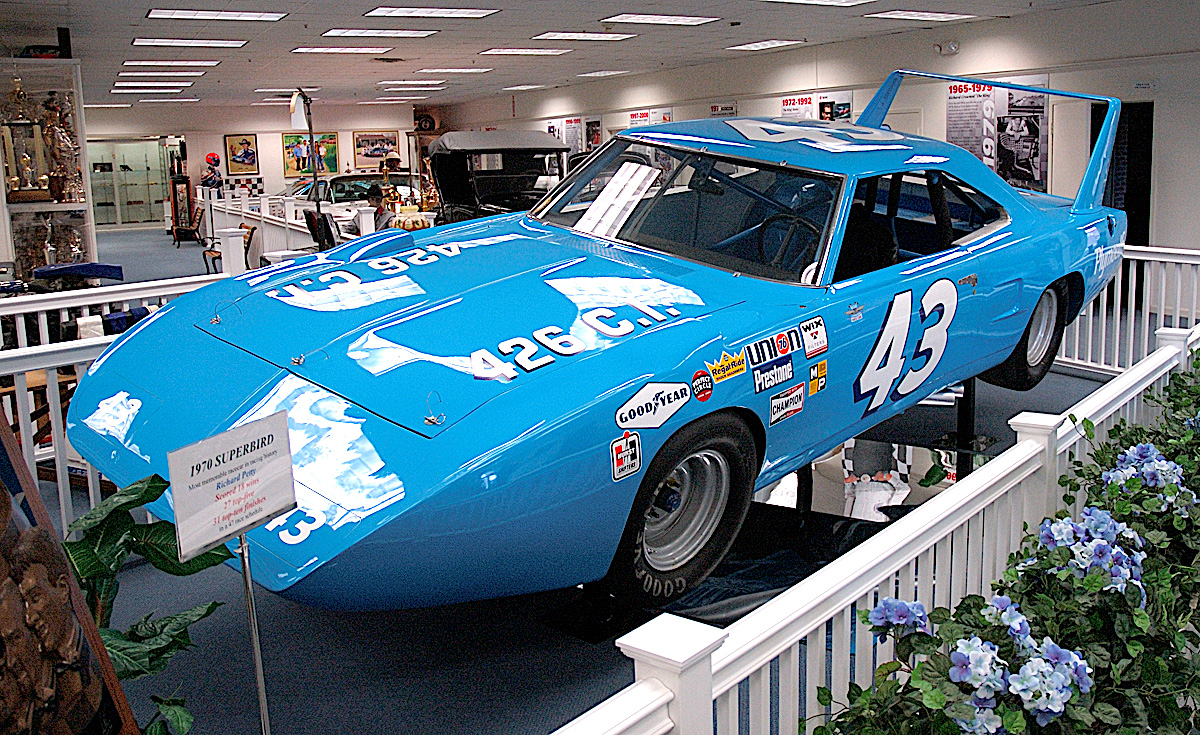
Richard Petty's 1970 426 C.I. Plymouth Superbird on display

Early in NASCAR's history, foreign manufacturers had shown interest in entering the series; British manufacturer MG entered cars and earned several placements. For example, Smokey Cook drove an MG to a 17th-place finish at the 1963 International 200.

The first NASCAR race held outside the US was in Stamford Park, Ontario, Canada, on July 1, 1952. Buddy Shuman won the 200-lap race, held on a half-mile (800 m) dirt track.

== Sanctioned series ==
=== National series ===
==== Cup Series ====
The start of the 2015 Daytona 500

The NASCAR Cup Series (NCS) is the sport's highest level of professional competition. It is consequently the most popular and most profitable NASCAR series. Since 2001, the Cup Series season has consisted of 36 races over 10 months. Writers and fans often use "Cup" to refer to the NCS and the ambiguous use of "NASCAR" as a synonym for the series is common. The record for most championships is 7, held by three drivers: Richard Petty, Dale Earnhardt, and Jimmie Johnson. Johnson has the record for most consecutive with five consecutive Cup Series drivers' championships from 2006 to 2010. Previously, the most consecutive championships had been three in a row by Cale Yarborough in the late 1970s, the only other time when a driver has won three or more NASCAR Cup Series championships in a row.

The Cup Series had its first title sponsor in 1972. R. J. Reynolds Tobacco Company, which had been banned from television advertising, found a popular and demographically suitable consumer base in NASCAR fans and engaged NASCAR as a promotional outlet. As a result of that sponsorship, the Grand National Series became known as the Winston Cup Series starting in 1971, with a new points system and some significant cash benefits to compete for championship points. In 1972, the season was shortened from 48 races (including two on dirt tracks) to 31. 1972 is often acknowledged as the beginning of NASCAR's "modern era". The next competitive level, called Late Model Sportsman, gained the "Grand National" title passed down from the top division and soon found a sponsor in Busch Beer.

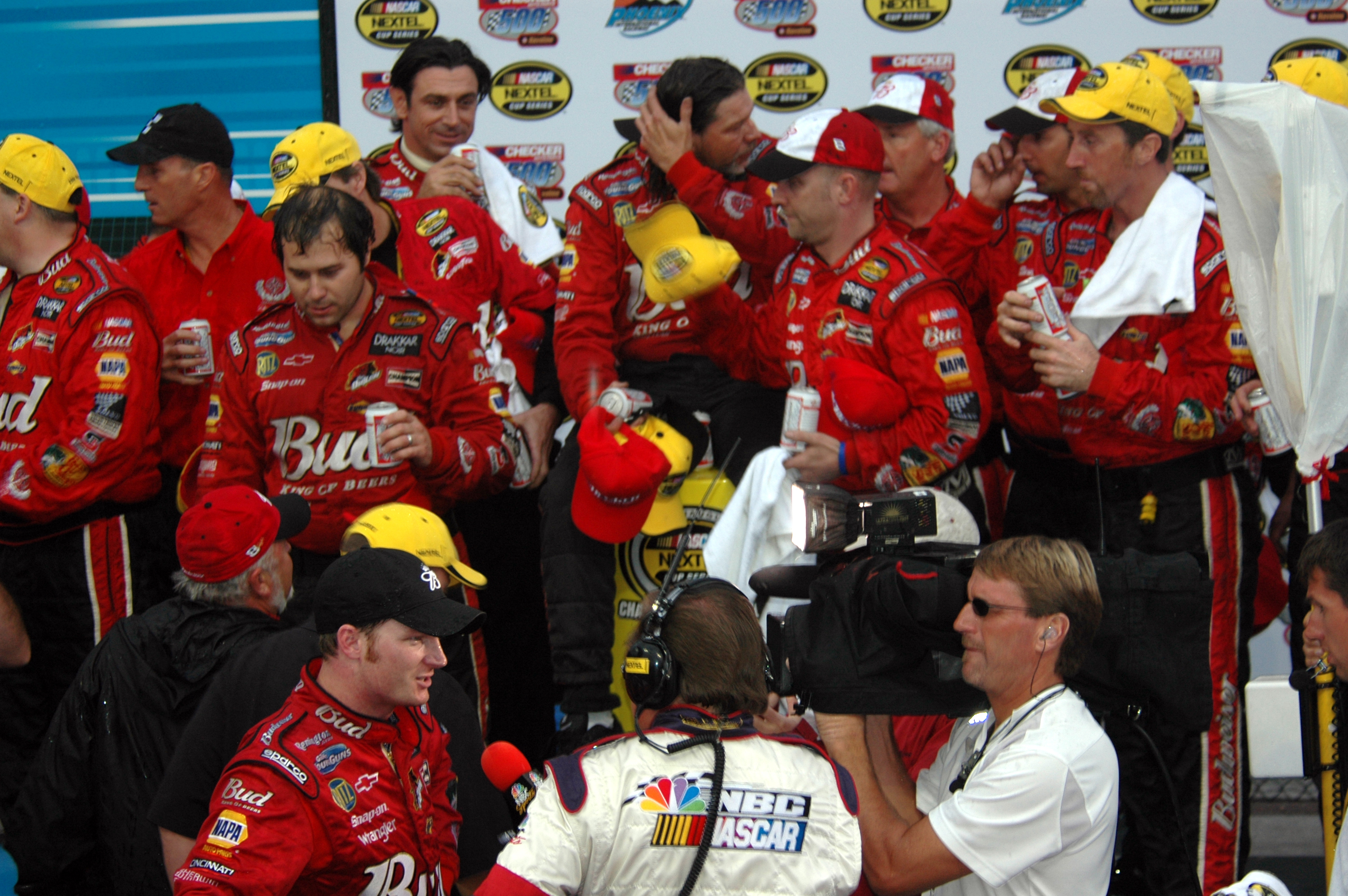
Dale Earnhardt Jr. (bottom), and team in victory lane in 2004

In 2004, Nextel Communications took over sponsorship of the premier series, and formally renamed it the Nextel Cup Series. A new championship points system, the "Chase for the Nextel Cup", (renamed "Chase for the Sprint Cup" in 2008) was also developed, which reset the point standings with ten races to go, making only drivers in the top ten or within 400 points of the leader eligible to win the championship. In 2007, NASCAR announced it was expanding "The Chase" from ten to twelve drivers, eliminating the 400-point cutoff, and giving a ten-point bonus to the top twelve drivers for each of the races they have won out of the first 26. Wins throughout the season would also be awarded five more points than in previous seasons. In 2008, the premier series title name became the Sprint Cup Series, as part of the merger between Nextel and Sprint.

In 2011, NASCAR announced a number of major rules changes, the most significant being abandoning the previous points system. The winner of a race would receive 43 points, with one-point decrements for each subsequent position (42 for second, 41 for third, and so on). The winner also would receive 3 bonus points, and single bonus points were awarded to all drivers who lead a lap, plus the driver who led the most laps. Another significant change involved the qualifying process for the Chase. The number of qualifying drivers remained at 12, but only the top 10 qualified solely on regular-season points. The remaining two Chase drivers were the two drivers in the next 10 of the point standings (11th through 20th) with the most race wins in the regular season.

In 2014, NASCAR announced another revamp to the Chase format, expanding the Chase pool to 16 drivers, and eliminating four drivers after every three races, leaving four drivers to compete for the championship at the season finale at Homestead. In addition, wins were given an increased emphasis, with the 16 drivers with the most wins (15 if the points leader is winless; points leader will receive an automatic berth) gaining a spot in the chase. If there are fewer than 16 winners, the remaining spots will be filled based on the conventional points system.

Monster Energy became the title sponsor in 2017, which changed the series' name to Monster Energy NASCAR Cup Series. With Monster Energy's title sponsorship, NASCAR also abandoned "The Chase" name and began referring to the last 10 races simply as "the playoffs" similar to most other sports.

After the 2019 season, NASCAR declined an offer from Monster Energy to remain the title sponsor of the top series. On December 5, NASCAR revealed their new sponsorship model. Instead of a singular title sponsor, four "premier partners" (Coca-Cola, Xfinity, Busch Beer and GEICO) would be closely affiliated with the top series, which was simply renamed the NASCAR Cup Series. GEICO departed the sport after the 2024 season.

Prior to the start of the 2026 season, NASCAR announced that their postseason would revert to a format similar to the one used in 2004, in which a single points cutoff and reset would take place at the end of the 26-race regular season. At that point, the top sixteen drivers in the points standings would compete for the championship over the course of the next ten races, with the championship being awarded to the driver with the most points at the end of the season. The name "The Chase" would also return, replacing the "Playoffs" term used from 2017 to 2025. Additional changes included the removal of the "playoff points" system, and that race wins would award an increased 55 points, but would no longer result in automatically qualifying for the Chase.

==== O'Reilly Auto Parts Series ====
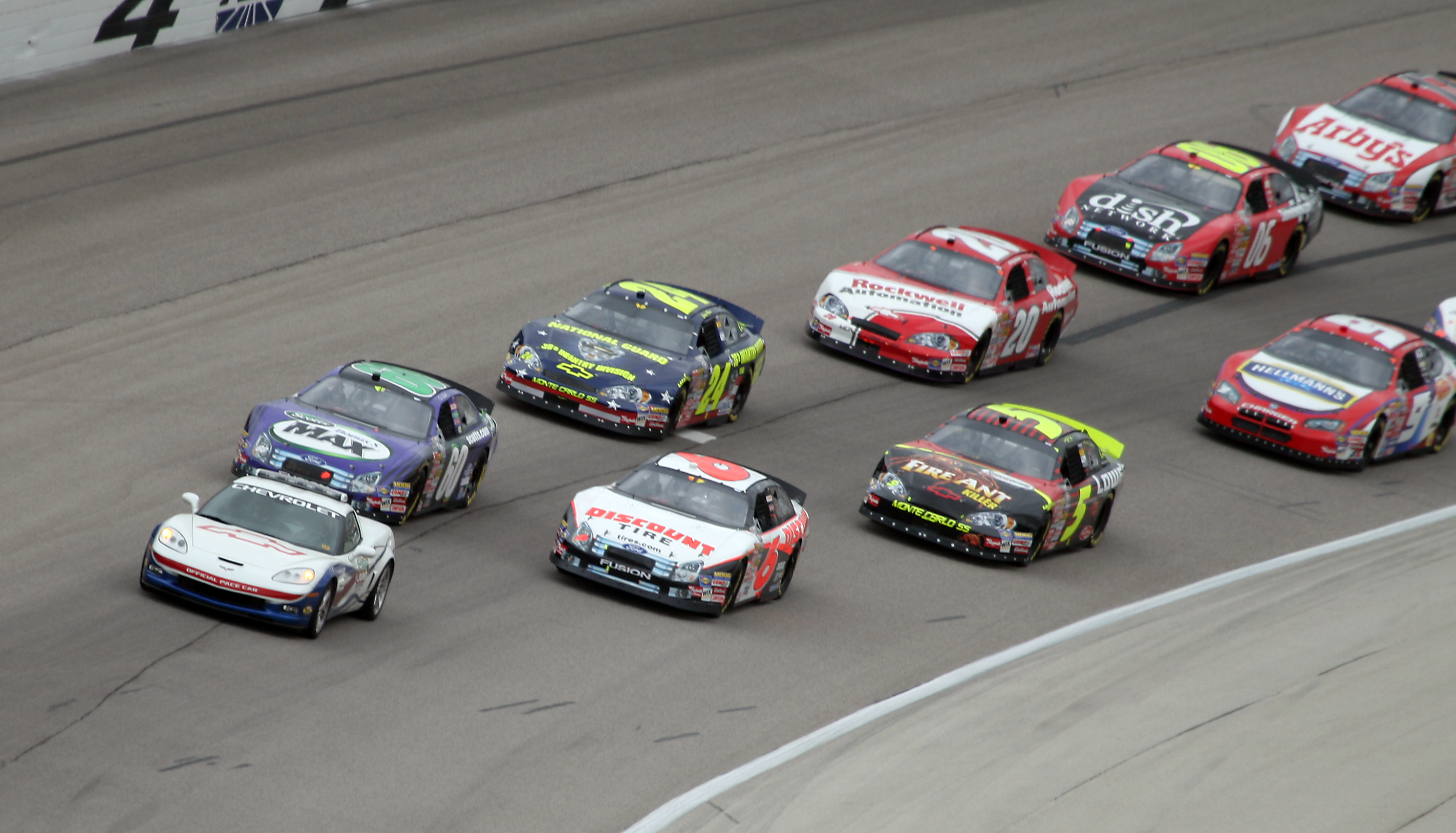
The Busch (now O'Reilly Auto Parts) Series field following the pace car at the O'Reilly 300 at Texas Motor Speedway in 2007

The NASCAR O'Reilly Auto Parts Series is the second-highest level of professional competition in NASCAR. The most recent series champion is Jesse Love in 2025. The modern incarnation of this series began in 1982, with sponsorship by Anheuser-Busch Brewing's Budweiser brand. In 1984, it was renamed to the Busch Grand National Series, then later just the Busch Series. The Anheuser-Busch sponsorship expired at the end of 2007, being replaced by Nationwide Insurance from 2008 to 2014, and then sponsored by Comcast through its Xfinity brand from 2015 to 2025. Beginning in 2026, the series will be sponsored by O'Reilly Auto Parts and named the NASCAR O'Reilly Auto Parts Series.

The season usually has fewer races than the Cup Series, and the prize money is significantly lower. However, over the last several years, a number of Cup Series drivers have run both the O'Reilly and Cup Series events each weekend, using the O'Reilly race as a warm-up to the Cup event at the same facility. Furthermore, several drivers not only participated in both Cup and Busch/Nationwide/Xfinity/O'Reilly events on the same weekend but also began to compete in both series on a full-time basis. Kevin Harvick was the first Cup series driver to compete full-time in the Busch Series and win a title, actually doing so twice; in 2001, he did this for Richard Childress Racing but only did so out of necessity as Dale Earnhardt's death forced him into the Cup series ahead of RCR's intended schedule for him. His win in 2006, where he raced three cars for RCR and his race team, was the first of five consecutive titles in NBS/NNS that were won by Cup series regulars.

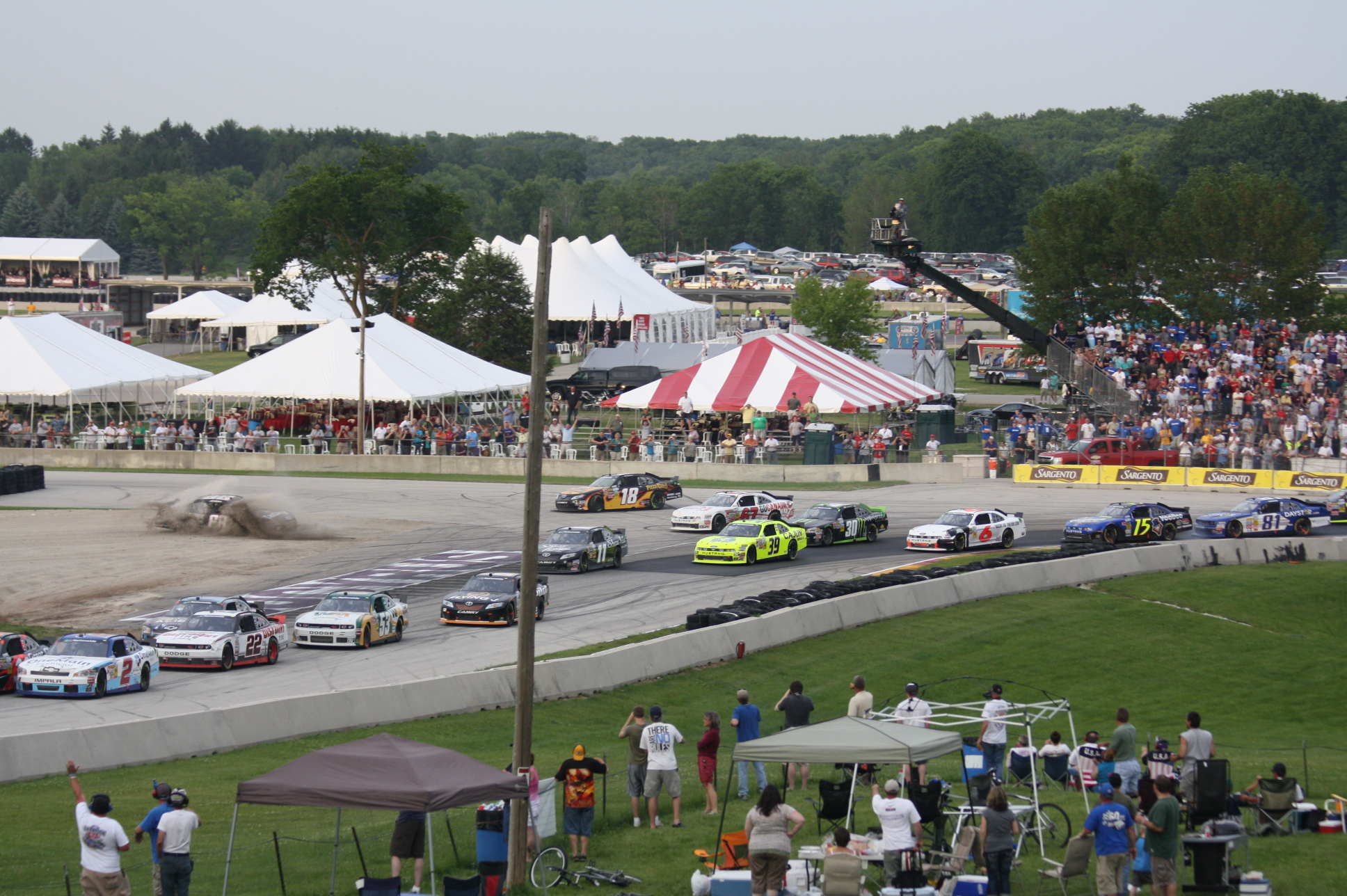
The Nationwide (now O'Reilly Auto Parts) Series at Road America in 2011, using the Car of Tomorrow design

The practice received criticism because it was thought to give the Cup Series teams an unfair advantage, and that the presence of the Cup Series drivers squeezes out Nationwide Series competitors who would otherwise be able to qualify. These dual-series drivers have been labeled "Buschwhackers", a play on words which combines the original series sponsor's name with the notion of being bushwhacked. In May 2007, NNS director Joe Balash confirmed that NASCAR was exploring options to deal with the Buschwhacker controversy. One of the most often-cited proposals was for Cup Series drivers participating in the Nationwide Series to receive no points for their participation in a Nationwide race. In 2007, NASCAR chairman Brian France indicated that all options, except an outright ban of Cup competitors, were still being considered. On January 11, 2011, NASCAR.com reported that beginning with the 2011 season, drivers would be allowed to compete for the championship in only one of NASCAR's three national series in a given season, although they could continue to run in multiple series. This change was officially confirmed by France in a press conference less than two weeks later, and has remained in the NASCAR rules ever since.

Beginning in 2010, the Nationwide cars adapted somewhat to the current "Car of Tomorrow" (or COT) design used by Cup cars, with different bodies from the Cup Series.

In 2016, the Chase format was extended to both the Xfinity and Truck Series. Instead of the four-round, 10-race format used in the Cup Series, the Chase in each of the two supporting series consists of three rounds and seven races in all, with each preliminary round consisting of three races. The O'Reilly Auto Parts Series Chase involves 12 drivers instead of the 16 participating in the Cup Series Chase. Four drivers are eliminated at the end of each preliminary round of the Chase in the O'Reilly Auto Parts Series, which also mirrors the Cup Series Chase. This means that four drivers are eligible for the series title entering the final race, as in the Cup Series. Similar to Cup, starting in 2017 "The Chase" moniker was dropped and the final seven races are now referred to as the O'Reilly Auto Parts Playoffs.

Even with restrictions limiting points earnings to one national series, Cup drivers were still running and winning a vast majority of O'Reilly Auto Parts series races through 2015. Starting with the 2015 season finale, NASCAR began to add additional restrictions in regards to Cup drivers running O'Reilly races. Beginning in the 2020 season, Cup drivers with more than three years of experience in the top series were limited to five races per season. Furthermore, those same drivers are ineligible to run the regular season finale, NOAPS playoff races, or Dash 4 Cash races.

==== Truck Series ====
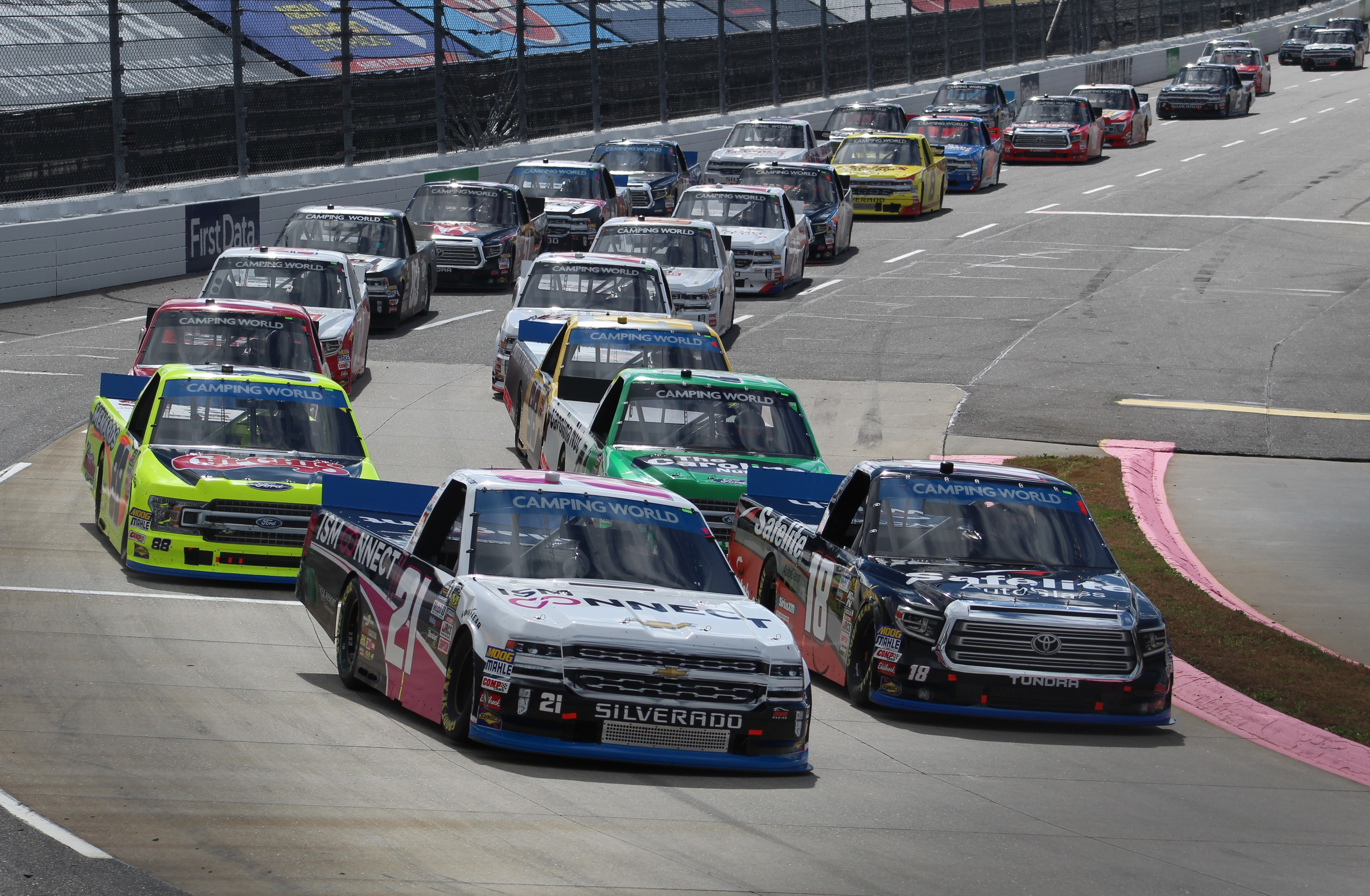
The Truck Series at Martinsville Speedway in 2018

The NASCAR Truck Series features modified pickup trucks. It is one of the three national divisions of NASCAR, together with the O'Reilly and Cup Series. The most recent series champion is Corey Heim in 2025.

In 1994, NASCAR announced the formation of the NASCAR SuperTruck Series presented by Craftsman. The first series race followed in 1995. In 1996, the series was renamed the NASCAR Craftsman Truck Series to emphasize Craftsman's involvement. The series was first considered something of an oddity or a "senior tour" for NASCAR drivers, but eventually grew in popularity and has seen drivers move straight to the Cup Series without running a full season in NASCAR O'Reilly Auto Parts Series competition. These include Kurt Busch and Carl Edwards (who both ran for Roush Racing). In addition, veteran drivers who have had only moderate success at the other two levels of the sport have revitalized their careers in the truck series, including Ron Hornaday Jr., Todd Bodine, Mike Skinner, and Johnny Benson.

Beginning in 2009, the series became the Camping World Truck Series. In 2019, per a branding request made by Camping World, the series was rebranded as the NASCAR Gander Outdoors Truck Series.

As noted previously, the Chase format was extended to the Truck Series in 2016. The format is identical to that used in the O'Reilly Series, except that only eight drivers qualify for the playoffs (instead of 12 in the O'Reilly Series) and only two drivers are eliminated at the end of each preliminary round (instead of four in the O'Reilly Series). As in both the Cup Series and O'Reilly Series, four drivers are eligible for the series title entering the final race. Similar to Cup, starting in 2017 "The Chase" moniker was dropped and is now simply referred to as the Truck Series Playoffs.

On May 8, 2018, NASCAR and Camping World announced the Truck Series title sponsor would be moved to Camping World subsidiary Gander Outdoors starting in 2019. The series was renamed again in 2020 to the NASCAR Gander RV & Outdoors Truck Series before returning to the Camping World Truck Series name in 2021.

On August 26, 2022 it was announced that the original series' sponsor, Craftsman, would return as the title sponsor starting in the 2023 season.

==== ARCA Menards Series ====
The ARCA Menards Series is a racing series that races at big touring series tracks and local racing series tracks. It is primarily a Midwestern United States series. NASCAR acquired the series on April 27, 2018 after being privately owned for 60 years.

=== International series ===
==== Canada Series ====
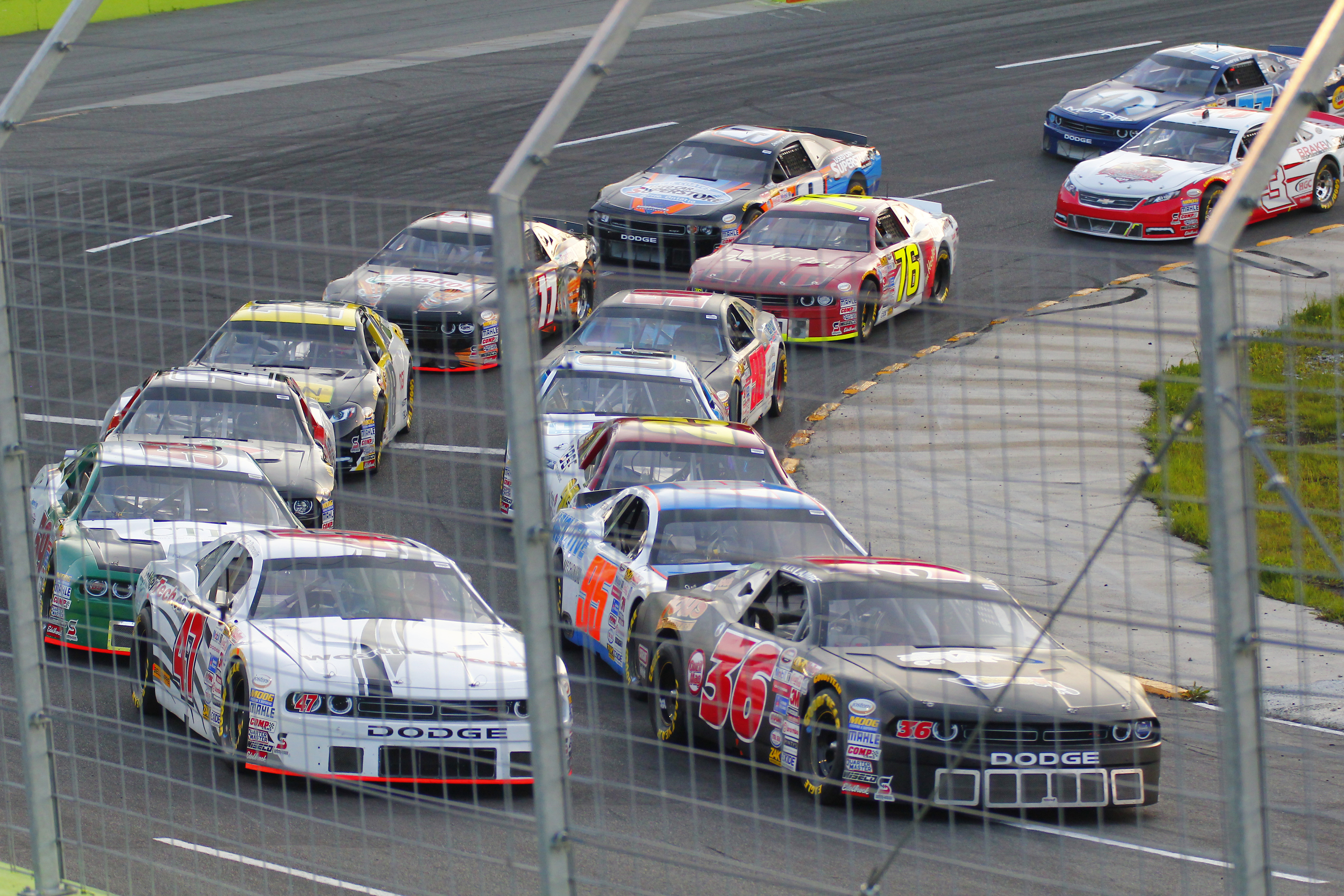
NASCAR Canada Series cars at Autodrome Chaudiere in 2015

The NASCAR Canada Series is a NASCAR racing series in Canada that derives from the old CASCAR Super Series (founded in 1981 and bought out by NASCAR in 2006). The new series has races through six of Canada's provinces for a total of 13 events with TV coverage on TSN. Many drivers are content running in Canada while others move up to bigger NASCAR series including J. R. Fitzpatrick and D. J. Kennington. The cars are a bit different from the cars seen in America, being more akin to a late model, though steel tube-framed silhouette bodies powered by V8 engines is still the norm.

==== Mexico Series ====
In December 2006, NASCAR also announced the creation of a new series in Mexico, the NASCAR Corona Series (now Mexico Series), replacing the existing Desafío Corona Series, to begin in 2007.

In 2004, NASCAR also began to sanction a mini stock racing series in Mexico, known as the Mexico T4 Series.

==== Euro Series ====
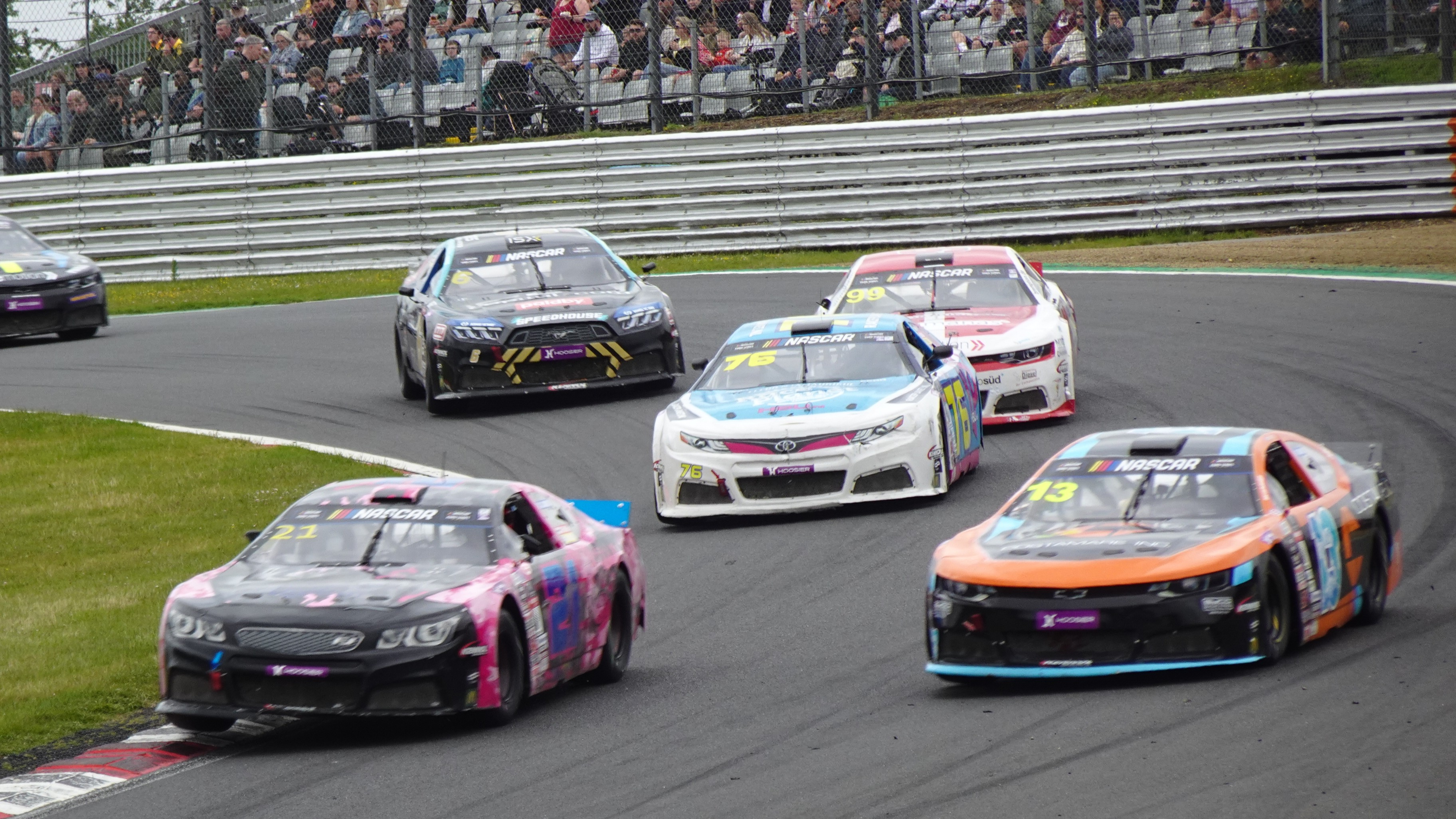
NASCAR Euro Series race at Brands Hatch in 2026

In early 2012, NASCAR announced that it would sanction the existing European-based Racecar Euro Series as a "NASCAR Touring Series". On July 1, 2013, with partnership from NASCAR Whelen Engineering, the series was renamed the NASCAR Whelen Euro Series.

==== Brasil Series ====
Launched in 2012 as the Sprint Race series, in 2023 the series received NASCAR sanctioning and technical assistance, becoming the newest of the NASCAR international series.

=== Regional racing series ===
In addition to the six main national series, NASCAR operates several other racing divisions under the NASCAR Regional banner.

==== Weekly Series ====
Many local race tracks across the United States and Canada run under the NASCAR Advance Auto Parts Weekly Series banner, where local drivers are compared against each other in a formula where the best local track champion of the nation wins the Whelen All-American Weekly Series National Championship. The Whelen All-American series is split into four car divisions as well as state and track championships separately. Each division champion receives a point-fund money payout and even more goes to the National champion (driver with most points out of the four division winners). The Whelen All-American Series is the base for stock car racing, developing NASCAR names such as Clint Bowyer, Jimmy Spencer, Tony Stewart, the Bodine brothers, and many others along the way.

==== Whelen Modified Tour ====
The Whelen Modified Tour races open-wheel "modified" cars in Northern and Southern divisions. This is NASCAR's oldest division, and the modern division has been operating since 1985 as the Winston Modified Series and later in 1994 as the Featherlite Trailers Modified Series.

==== ARCA Menards Series East and West ====
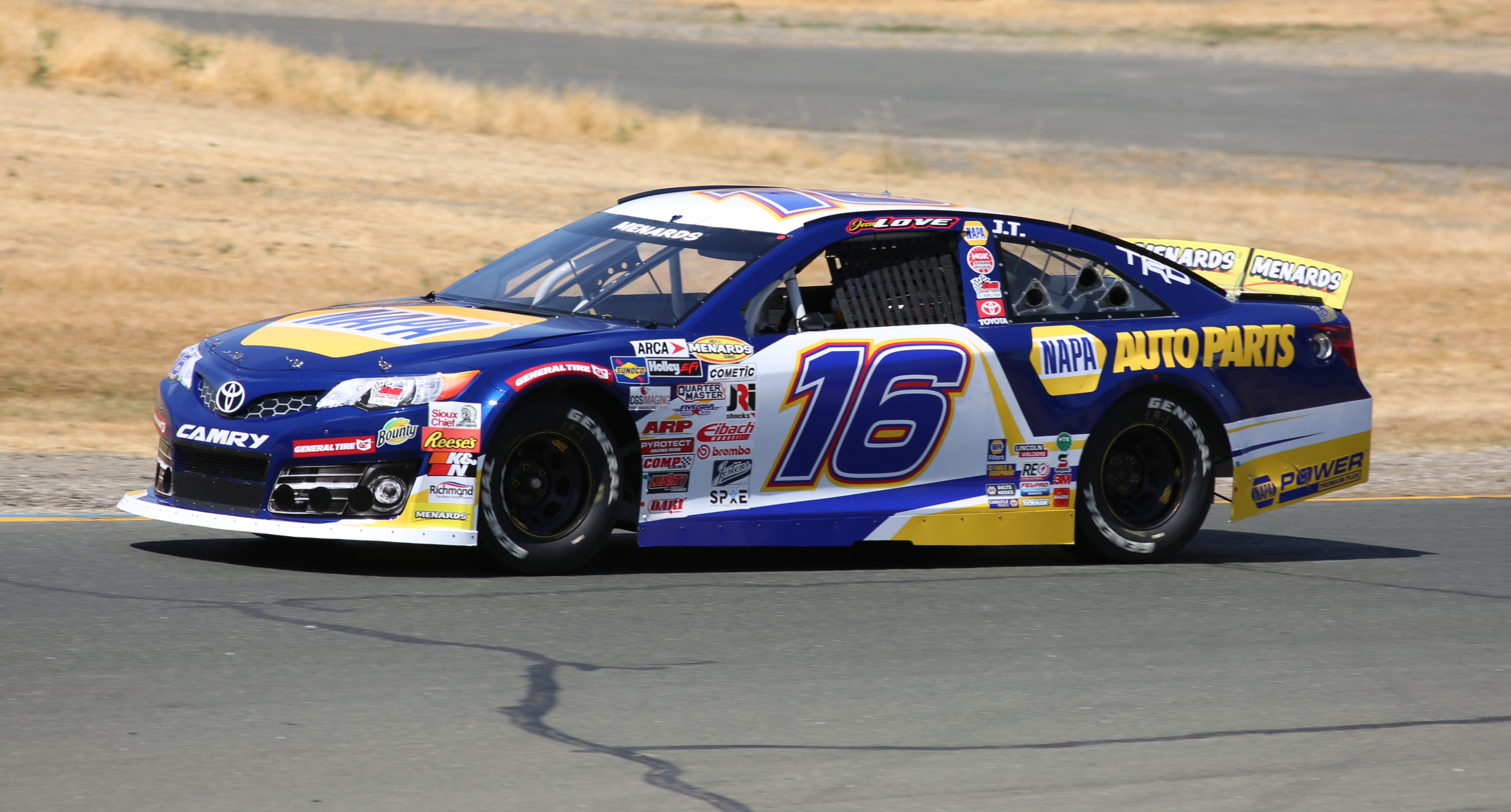
ARCA West car of Jesse Love at Sonoma Raceway in 2021

The ARCA Menards Series' feeder divisions, which consists of East and West divisions, race pro-stock cars that are similar to older Cup Series cars, although they are less powerful. The east division was originally divided into the Busch North series, which raced in Northeastern states, and the Busch East Series, which raced throughout Southeastern and Mid-Atlantic states. The west division was originally known as the Winston West Series and raced throughout Southwestern and Coastal Pacific states. In 2008, the series came together in east and west divisions under sponsorship from Camping World as the Camping World Series. K&N Filters took over the sponsorship in 2010. 2019 was the last season for both of the series before they are to go under the ARCA banner in 2020 as part of the unification of the NASCAR K&N Pro Series East and West and the ARCA Menards Series. The series became known as the ARCA Menards Series East and ARCA Menards Series West starting in 2020, meaning 2019 was also K&N's last year as the series title sponsor.

==== AutoZone Elite and other divisions ====
In the past, NASCAR also sanctioned the AutoZone Elite Division, which raced late-model cars that were lighter and less powerful than Cup Series cars, and was originally split into four divisions: Northwest, Southwest, Southeast, and Midwest. At the end of 2005, NASCAR announced that the AutoZone Elite Division would be discontinued after the 2006 season due to having trouble securing NASCAR-sanctioned tracks to successfully host AutoZone Elite Division events, plus escalating costs of competing and downsizing of the Division in recent years. In 2003, NASCAR standardized rules for its AutoZone Elite and Grand National divisions regional touring series as to permit cars in one series to race against cars in another series in the same division. The top 15 (Grand National) or 10 (AutoZone Elite) in each series will race in a one-race playoff, called the NASCAR Toyota All-Star Showdown, to determine the annual AutoZone Elite and Grand National champions. This event has been hosted at Irwindale Speedway in California since its inception.

Many drivers move up through the series before reaching the Cup Series. In 2002, over 9,000 drivers had licenses from NASCAR to race at all levels.

The winners of the All-American Series National Championship, the ARCA Menards Series, ARCA East and ARCA West championships, the Whelen Modified and Grand National Divisions, and the three national series are invited to Las Vegas in December to participate in Champions Week ceremonies.

=== Online racing series ===
==== eNASCAR Coca-Cola iRacing Series ====
In 2010, NASCAR officially sanctioned its first sim racing esports series, partnering with iRacing to form the NASCAR iRacing.com Series. This sim racing series is made of up of five "Amateur Series" divisions, the NASCAR iRacing.com Pro Series, and the PEAK Antifreeze NASCAR iRacing Series (NPAiS), one of iRacing's World Championship Series. Each year, the champion of the NASCAR iRacing.com World Championship Series is invited to NASCAR's Championship Weekend at Homestead to receive $10,500 prize money and NASCAR championship trophy at the track.

In 2018, iRacing announced a new, sanctioned qualifying ladder system for the NPAiS, the Road to Pro Series, using virtual Chevrolet and Toyota Camping World Trucks. At the same time, the NASCAR iRacing Pro Series would switch to using the Xfinity Series Camaro, Mustang and Camry models, to replicate the progression to the real life Cup series cars used in the NPAiS.

In 2020, Coca-Cola became the entitlement sponsor of the series and it was renamed the eNASCAR Coca-Cola iRacing Series. With the sponsorship, the prize pool increased to $300,000. Additionally, six races will be televised on NBCSN.

==== eNASCAR Ignite Series ====
The series was created as a developmental league by NASCAR and iRacing for aspiring gamers ages 13–16. The simulator begins with US Legends cars before moving to Modified Tour cars.

== Driver safety ==
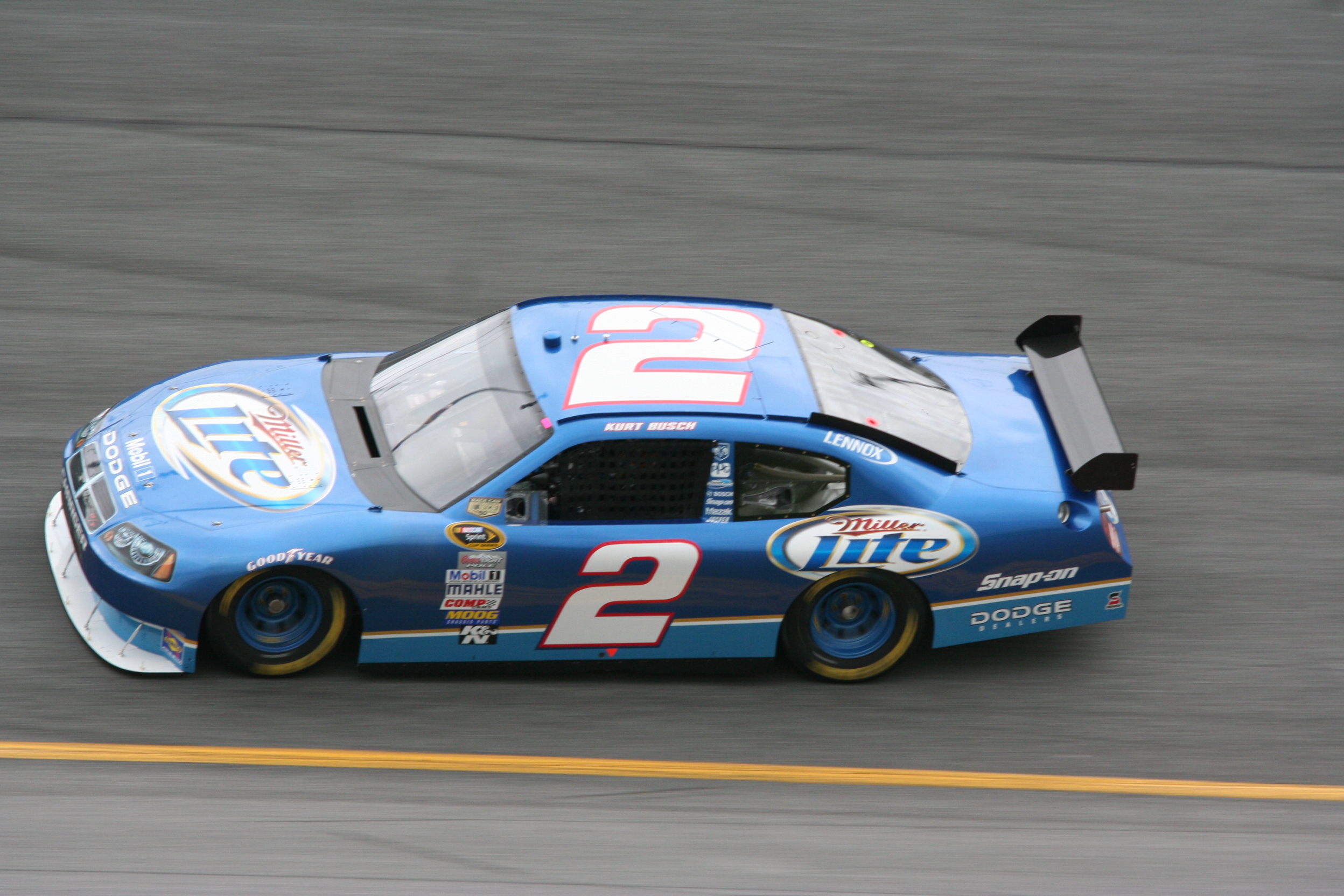
2008 Dodge Charger "Car of Tomorrow", driven by Kurt Busch

NASCAR has often implemented safety measures reactively in response to injuries or fatalities. Fire-retardant driver suits were required after the death of Fireball Roberts, who died from complications of burns suffered in a crash when flames engulfed his car during a Charlotte race. After the deaths of Adam Petty, Kenny Irwin and Tony Roper in 2000 and Dale Earnhardt in 2001, NASCAR revisited the idea of decreasing the G-forces a driver sustained during a crash. The "kill switch" throttle, was mandated after the death of Adam Petty, along with the requirements of an anti-spill bladder in fuel cells. The impact-absorbing "SAFER Barrier" had been in use as early as 1998, but NASCAR hesitated to install those walls out of concerns that they may bring about unintended consequences of aggravating the crashes, and possibly because of the effort needed to clean up the debris from the damaged walls. Dale Earnhardt fatally suffered a fracture to the base of his skull after his car slammed into the concrete wall in the 2001 Daytona 500. Earnhardt's death prompted NASCAR to implement the SAFER barrier and consider drastic improvements to the safety of the drivers. One of these would require all drivers to use the "HANS device" (Head And Neck Support Device), a device that keeps the driver's neck from going forward in a wreck. The mandate came about in October after Blaise Alexander, racing for the ARCA series, died in a crash that resulted in the same injuries sustained as Earnhardt. NASCAR redesigned the racing vehicle with safety improvements, calling it the Car of Tomorrow, which debuted in 2007. The car had a higher roof, wider cockpit, and the driver seat was located more toward the center of the vehicle.

The death of Dale Earnhardt has been seen as a "wake-up" call for NASCAR. NASCAR has been far more aggressive with safety changes since Earnhardt's death, and as of 2024, no NASCAR driver has been involved in a fatal accident since.

== Criticism ==
NASCAR has been the target of criticism on various topics from various sources. Some critics note the significant differences between today's NASCAR vehicles and true "stock" cars. Others frequently cite the dominance of the France family in NASCAR's business structure, policies, and decision making. Recently, the increased number of Cup drivers competing consistently in the O'Reilly Auto Parts Series races has been hotly debated. Another general area of criticism, not only of NASCAR but other motorsports as well, includes questions about fuel consumption, emissions and pollution, and the use of lead additives in the gasoline. Originally scheduled for 2008, NASCAR adopted the use of unleaded fuel in all three of its top series in 2007. In 2011, NASCAR switched to E15 "green" fuel (15% ethanol and 85% gasoline) for all three touring series.

As NASCAR has made moves to improve its national appeal, it has begun racing at new tracks, and ceased racing at some traditional ones – a sore spot for the traditional fan base. Most recently, NASCAR has been challenged on the types and frequency of caution flags, with some critics suggesting the outcome of races is being manipulated, and that the intention is not safety, as NASCAR claims, but closer racing.

There have been a few accidents involving fans during races and even some off the tracks, but no spectator has ever been killed during a race in an accident relating to the race, although a fan was killed by a lightning strike in 2012 after the 2012 Pennsylvania 400 at Pocono was called short due to the storm. It was revealed in 2008 that a wrongful death lawsuit against NASCAR stemming from the crash of a company plane was settled for $2.4 million.

For years, NASCAR had been under criticism for allowing the Confederate flag to be flown during races. Former chairman Brian France tried to ban the flying of Confederate flags at race tracks in 2015, which caused anger among fans. It had previously asked fans to voluntarily stop flying the flag after the 2015 Charleston church shooting, but this did not end the practice. Bubba Wallace, the only African-American NASCAR top-circuit driver, drove the 2020 spring Martinsville race in a car with Black Lives Matter livery, and appeared in an anti-racism video with a number of white drivers. On June 10, 2020, in the wake of protests related to the murder of George Floyd, NASCAR announced that the display of the Confederate flag will be prohibited from all of its events and properties.

In February 2022, the U.S. 11th Circuit Court of Appeals ruled in a lawsuit against Bitconnect that the Securities Act of 1933 extends to targeted solicitation using social media. In April 2022, a class-action lawsuit was filed in Florida against the LGBcoin cryptocurrency company, NASCAR, stock car racing driver Brandon Brown, and political commentator Candace Owens alleging that the defendants made false or misleading statements about the LGBcoin and that the founders of the company had engaged in a pump and dump scheme.

== Global expansion ==
In 2006, Toyota announced they would be joining NASCAR's ranks. Toyota generated early success winning several races off performances from Denny Hamlin and Kyle Busch. Any increase in foreign competition is expected to raise the price of putting a car on the track.

Another topic on the NASCAR circuit is the increase in foreign born drivers and the effects they may have on the future of NASCAR. Juan Pablo Montoya, Patrick Carpentier, Dario Franchitti, Kimi Räikkönen, and Jenson Button are among the foreign-born big names who have crossed over from Formula One and the Indy car circuit. These drivers have made an impact on NASCAR not only by winning races and dominating road courses, but by expanding NASCAR's point of view.

NASCAR included a race at the Mexican road course Autódromo Hermanos Rodríguez in the Nationwide Series schedule from 2005 through 2008, as well as a race in Montreal, Canada at Circuit Gilles Villeneuve from 2007 through 2012, with the Camping World Truck Series adding a date at Canadian Tire Motorsport Park in 2013. There has been talk of possible expansion with exhibition races in Japan and a return to Canada.

Expanding into international markets could increase NASCAR's popularity and allow foreign sponsors and manufacturers to get involved in the sport. Some think this could be a very positive move for NASCAR, which has seen its television ratings drop 21 percent between 2005 and 2007. During the same 2-year period, NASCAR also saw the greatest drop in tickets prices observed in over a decade. In 2010, NASCAR saw television ratings drop 10% from the year before, which was down 33% off its peak in 2005. Some think that an increase in international diversity would translate into growth and generate greater opportunities for NASCAR fans.

In 2023, to celebrate their 75th anniversary, NASCAR partnered with Chevrolet and Hendrick Motorsports to enter a Next Gen Camaro ZL1 in the 24 Hours of Le Mans. It coincided with the 100th anniversary of the prestigious endurance race at the Circuit de la Sarthe in Le Mans, Sarthe, France, and the Camaro entered as a Garage 56 (Innovative) entry. Jimmie Johnson and Button were joined by German WEC veteran and Mike Rockenfeller – a 2010 LMP1 category and overall winner at Le Mans – as the drivers. Chad Knaus, Johnson's crew chief during each of his Cup Series championships, was project manager, while the car bore #24 in honor of Jeff Gordon.

== NASCAR.com ==
In October 2000, Turner Sports acquired the digital rights to NASCAR, and subsequently took over its website, which features news, information, and interactive features (such as RaceView and RaceBuddy) surrounding its series. While NASCAR had extended Turner's contract to operate the site through 2016, the association announced in January 2012 that it would take operation of the site back in-house in 2013. As a result, a new NASCAR.com was launched on January 3, 2013, which features a multimedia-oriented design enhanced to provide a higher level of fan interaction, and provide an improved second screen experience for viewers on mobile devices.

On May 7, 2019, NASCAR announced a sports betting content partnership with The Action Network to provide editorial content and analysis to NASCAR.com, including recommended picks and value bets. NASCAR said the partnership was intended to prepare for the spread of legal sports betting in the U.S. following the 2018 U.S. Supreme Court ruling overturning the federal PASPA sports betting prohibition. NASCAR previously struck an exclusive deal with sports data solutions provider Genius Sports to develop an official NASCAR gaming offering for legal sportsbooks.

== Subsidiaries and sister organizations ==
=== NASCAR Productions ===
==== NASCAR Digital Media ====
NASCAR Digital Media is a television production company located in Charlotte, North Carolina, United States. The company is a subsidiary of NASCAR and produces programs designed to promote the sport of professional stock car racing. It also manages the NASCAR website, the website for its endurance racing series IMSA, as well as some websites related to the sport such as Racing-Reference and Jayski's Silly Season Site (as of 2019, after ESPN.com stopped hosting the website). They also own NASCAR Classics, a free online base of classic NASCAR races. As of 2025, NASCAR also produces NASCAR O'Reilly Auto Parts Series races broadcast by The CW under the NASCAR on The CW banner.

==== NASCAR Studios ====
NASCAR Studios is a production company that produces content including drivers, teams, partners, sponsors, and tracks. Current content includes podcast, documentaries, television shows, and films. The studio also produces content for the NASCAR Channel on Tubi.

=== Tracks owned and/or operated by NASCAR ===
Track name	Location	Length	Style	Year opened
Auto Club Speedway	Fontana, California	2.000 mi (3.219 km)	Oval	1997
Bowman Gray Stadium	Winston-Salem, North Carolina	0.25 mi (0.40 km)	Oval	1937
Chicagoland Speedway	Joliet, Illinois	1.520 mi (2.446 km)	Oval	2001
Darlington Raceway	Darlington, South Carolina	1.366 mi (2.198 km)	Oval	1950
Daytona International Speedway	Daytona Beach, Florida	2.500 mi (4.023 km)	Oval	1959
Flat Rock Speedway	Ash Township, Michigan	0.400 mi (0.644 km)	Oval	1953
Homestead–Miami Speedway	Homestead, Florida	1.502 mi (2.417 km)	Oval	1995
Iowa Speedway	Newton, Iowa	0.875 mi (1.408 km)	Oval	2006
Kansas Speedway	Kansas City, Kansas	1.500 mi (2.414 km)	Oval	2001
Martinsville Speedway	Ridgeway, Virginia	0.526 mi (0.847 km)	Oval	1947
Michigan International Speedway	Brooklyn, Michigan	2.000 mi (3.219 km)	Oval	1968
Phoenix Raceway	Avondale, Arizona	1.000 mi (1.609 km)	Oval	1964
Richmond Raceway	Richmond, Virginia	0.750 mi (1.207 km)	Oval	1946
Road Atlanta	Hall County, Georgia	2.540 mi (4.088 km)	Road course	1970
Route 66 Raceway	Joliet, Illinois	0.25 mi (0.40 km) (Dragstrip); 0.375 mi (0.604 km) (Dirt oval)	Dragstrip; Dirt oval	1998
Sebring International Raceway	Highlands County, Florida	3.741 mi (6.021 km)	Road course	1950
Talladega Superspeedway	Talladega, Alabama	2.660 mi (4.281 km)	Oval	1969
Toledo Speedway	Toledo, Ohio	0.50 mi (0.80 km)	Oval	1960
Watkins Glen International	Watkins Glen, New York	3.450 mi (5.552 km)	Road course	1948

=== ARCA ===
The Automobile Racing Club of America was purchased by NASCAR in 2018.

=== Grand-Am ===
The Grand American Road Racing Association (Grand-Am) was a sanctioning body of sports car racing. While it was founded independently of NASCAR by several members of the France family, NASCAR took over Grand-Am, but allowed it to operate autonomously. The series merged with the American Le Mans Series in 2014 as a part of NASCAR's purchase of IMSA.

=== Education ===
NASCAR Technical Institute located in Mooresville, North Carolina, is the country's first technical training school to combine a complete automotive technology program and a NASCAR-specific motor sports program, and is the exclusive educational partner of NASCAR.

NASCAR Kinetics was established in 2009 with the mission of connecting college students nationwide to NASCAR, and mentored its last round of students in 2013.

=== International Speedway Corporation (defunct) ===
International Speedway Corporation (ISC) was founded by Bill France Sr. in 1953 to construct and manage tracks at which NASCAR holds competitions. In May 2019, NASCAR announced that it would purchase ISC, including its 12 tracks, for $2 billion. On October 18, 2019, the acquisition was completed. ISC was subsequently folded into NASCAR.

== NASCAR in culture ==
Movies about NASCAR racing include Thunder in Carolina (1960), Speedway (1968), The Last American Hero (1973), Greased Lightning (1977), Stroker Ace (1983), Days of Thunder (1990), Herbie: Fully Loaded (2005), Talladega Nights: The Ballad of Ricky Bobby (2006), Ta Ra Rum Pum (2007), and Logan Lucky (2017).

NASCAR racing heavily influenced Pixar's Cars franchise, with the third film in particular drawing inspiration from NASCAR's history.

NASCAR drivers have made appearances in many television series and TV movies, including The Cleveland Show, Sullivan & Son, and Last Man Standing.

NASCAR partnered up with popular Roblox game Jailbreak, and the partnership was launched on November 5, 2021. NASCAR also partnered with the developers of Jailbreak to launch NASCAR Speed Hub to celebrate NASCAR's 75th anniversary.

In November 2025, it was reported that NASCAR was backing a stock car racing-themed historical drama by John Fusco—Thunder Road—for AMC. The series is planned to star Dennis Quaid .

== See also ==
- List of the closest NASCAR Cup Series finishes
- List of NASCAR champions
- List of NASCAR seasons
- List of NASCAR series
- List of NASCAR teams
- List of NASCAR tracks
- NASCAR in Australia
- NASCAR Rookie of the Year
- NASCAR rules and regulations
