= Keowee Key, South Carolina =

Census-designated place in South Carolina, United States

- Census-designated place
- Location within South Carolina Location within the United States
- Coordinates: 34°49′34″N 82°55′6″W
- Country: United States
- State: South Carolina
- County: Oconee

Area
  - Total: 6.12 sq mi (15.85 km^{2})
  - Land: 3.47 sq mi (8.98 km^{2})
  - Water: 2.65 sq mi (6.86 km^{2})
- Elevation: 948 ft (289 m)

Population (2020)
  - Total: 2,716
  - Density: 783.2/sq mi (302.39/km^{2})
- Time zone: UTC-5 (Eastern (EST))
  - Summer (DST): UTC-4 (EDT)
- ZIP Code: 29676 (Salem)
- Area codes: 864, 821
- FIPS code: 45-38058
- GNIS feature ID: 2812981

Keowee Key is a lakeside community and census-designated place (CDP) in Oconee County, South Carolina, United States. It is considered part of the Salem community. It was first listed as a CDP prior to the 2020 census with a population of 2,716.

The CDP is on the eastern edge of Oconee County, on a peninsula extending into Lake Keowee, a reservoir on the Keowee River and Little River. The arm of the lake on the Little River borders the western side of the peninsula, while the Keowee River arm forms the eastern side and is the border with Pickens County. The two arms of the lake join via a small channel in the south part of the CDP; to the south, across the channel and outside the CDP, is the Oconee Nuclear Station power plant. The Keowee River is a south-flowing tributary of the Seneca River, a main tributary of the Savannah River.

== Demographics ==
Historical population
Census	Pop.	Note	%±
2020	2,716		—
U.S. Decennial Census; 2020

Keowee Key first appeared as a census designated place in the 2020 U.S. census.

=== 2020 census ===
Keowee Key CDP, South Carolina – Demographic Profile (NH = Non-Hispanic)
Race / Ethnicity	Pop 2020	% 2020
White alone (NH)	2,604	95.88%
Black or African American alone (NH)	6	0.22%
Native American or Alaska Native alone (NH)	0	0.00%
Asian alone (NH)	13	0.48%
Pacific Islander alone (NH)	0	0.00%
Some Other Race alone (NH)	4	0.15%
Mixed Race/Multi-Racial (NH)	58	2.14%
Hispanic or Latino (any race)	31	1.14%
Total	2,716	100.00%

Note: the US Census treats Hispanic/Latino as an ethnic category. This table excludes Latinos from the racial categories and assigns them to a separate category. Hispanics/Latinos can be of any race.
