= Battle of Echoee =

1760 battle of the French and Indian War

- Part of the Anglo-Cherokee War and the French and Indian War
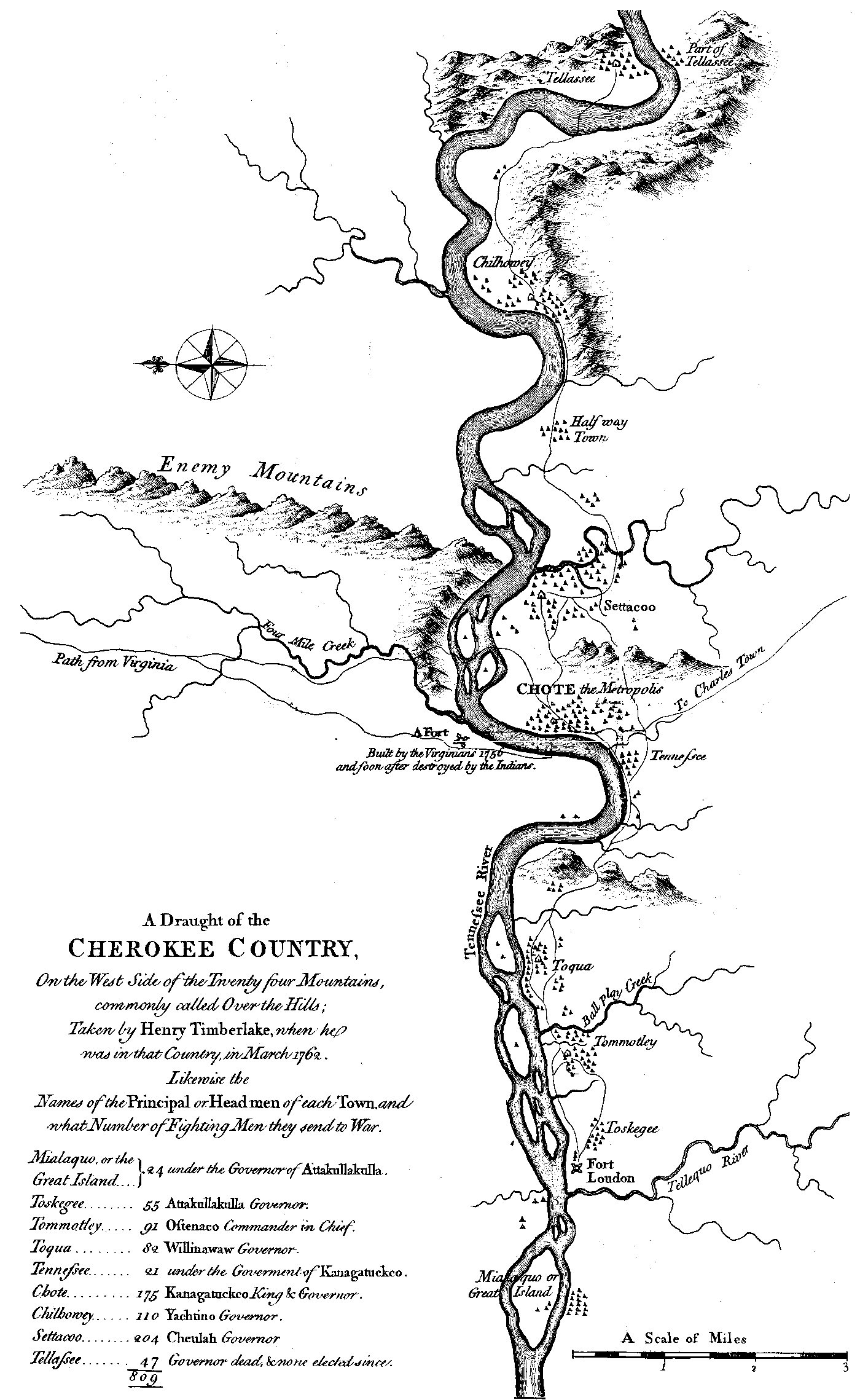
- Map of Cherokee Country by Henry Timberlake
Date	June 27, 1760
Location	Near present-day Otto, North Carolina
Result	Cherokee victory

Belligerents
Cherokee	Great Britain

Commanders and leaders
Seroweh	Archibald Montgomerie (WIA)

Strength
500	1,300–1,500

Casualties and losses
40 killed	20 killed 76 wounded

The Battle of Echoee, or Etchoe Pass, was a battle on June 27, 1760 during the French and Indian War, between the British and colonial force under Archibald Montgomerie and a force of Cherokee warriors under Seroweh. It took place near the present-day municipality of Otto, in Macon County, North Carolina.

== Background ==
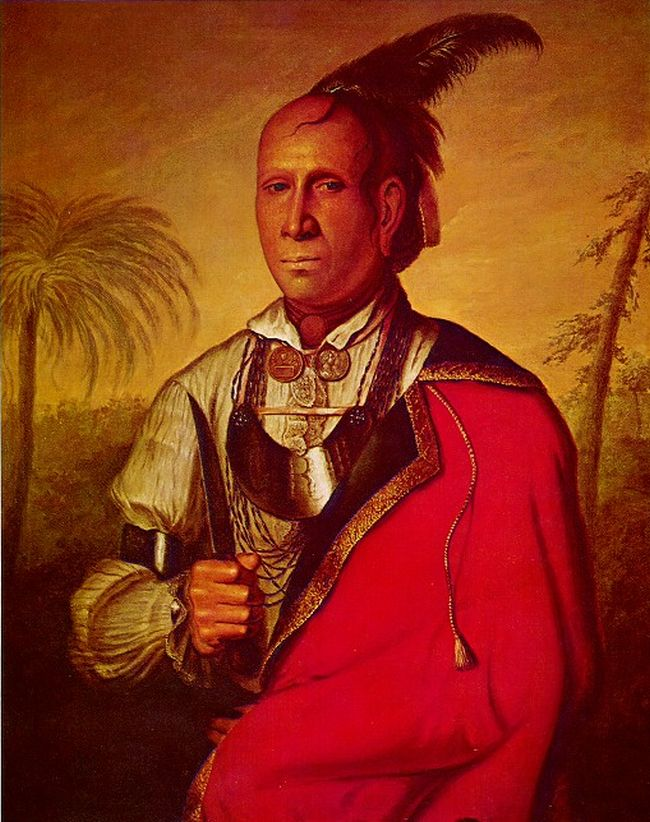
1762 portrait of Standing Turkey by Francis Parsons

With the outbreak of the French and Indian War in 1754, the Cherokee were sought out as allies by the British. They eventually took part in campaigns against the French-held Fort Duquesne (present day Pittsburgh, Pennsylvania) and their allies the Shawnee of the Ohio Country. In exchange for the participation of Cherokee warriors, the British agreed to build two forts to protect the Cherokee women, children and towns from the retaliation of the French and their Indian allies. The forts built by South Carolina were Fort Prince George, near Keowee on the Savannah River in the Lower Towns and Fort Loudoun, near the Cherokee town of Chota, where the Little Tennessee River and Tellico River converged, by the Overhill Towns in what is now Tennessee. A third fort, built by Virginia across the Little Tennessee River near Chota, was left unmanned.

Ostenaco, a Cherokee leader, took 100 warriors in the depths of winter in February 1756 to join Major Andrew Lewis, who commanded 200 Virginia Provincial troops. After six weeks, the expedition was out of supplies and had eaten their horses. The Cherokee, irritated by the performance of the Provincials, decided to begin walking back toward Chota. The following year, some Cherokee warriors joined a British army, which was being put together in Pennsylvania under British General John Forbes. The expedition, which included British regular troops, Provincials from North Carolina, Virginia and Pennsylvania, along with Catawba, Tuscarora, and a few Creek and Chickasaw warriors, was intended to force the French from their major fortification in western Pennsylvania, Fort Duquesne.

The Forbes campaign was plagued with logistical problems. As the British had promised goods to the various Indian warriors for their assistance but fell short, many warriors began leaving by June 1758. The British promised to provide goods to the warriors traveling home, many of whom were accompanied by their families. The warriors were told they could obtain provisions at forts located along their way back to their homelands. On their return, the Cherokee took some stray horses in Virginia to replace those they had lost. Virginia settlers got angry and banded together, pursuing the Cherokee, attacking them and killing, scalping and mutilating 20 of the Indians. They later collected a bounty offered by the Virginian colonial government on enemy scalps. Although Dinwiddie, the lieutenant governor of Virginia, apologized, some Virginians considered the Cherokee to be horse thieves. Some Cherokee and Amo-adawehi, the Moytoy of Citico, retaliated for the murders of the Cherokee at the hands of their colonial allies.

The situation worsened, as 14 Cherokee hostages were killed at Fort Prince George near Keowee by the garrison during a failed attempt to move them. The Cherokee later attacked Fort Loudoun, and hostilities continued into 1761. The Cherokee were led by Standing Turkey, Aganstata (Oconostota) of Chota, Attakullakulla (Atagulgalu) of Tanasi, Ostenaco of Tomotley, Wauhatchie (Wayatsi) of the Lower Towns, and Round O of the Middle Towns. The Cherokee sought allies among the other Indian tribes and help from the French, but they received no practical aid and faced the British colonials alone. The new governor of South Carolina, William Henry Lyttelton, had declared war on the Cherokee in 1759. The governor embargoed all shipments of gunpowder to the Cherokee and raised an army of 1,100 provincial troops, along with an artillery company under Christopher Gadsden, which marched to confront the Cherokee Lower Towns. Desperate for ammunition for their fall and winter hunts, which sustained their survival, the Cherokee sent a peace delegation of moderate chiefs to negotiate.

The thirty-two chiefs were taken prisoner and, escorted by the provincial army, were taken to Fort Prince George. There they were held in a room large enough to hold only six people. Lyttelton released three of the chiefs, thinking this would ensure peace. Lyttelton returned to Charleston, but the Cherokee retaliated by attacking frontier settlements into 1760. In February 1760, they attacked Fort Prince George in an effort to rescue their hostages. The fort's commander was killed, and his replacement ordered the remaining 14 hostages to be moved, which resulted in a confrontation that saw the garrison kill the hostages. The Cherokee also attacked Fort Ninety Six, but it withstood the siege. They besieged Fort Loudoun; and several lesser posts in the South Carolina back-country quickly fell to Cherokee raids. Lyttelton appealed for help to Jeffrey Amherst, the British commander in North America. Amherst sent Archibald Montgomerie with an army of 1,300 to 1,500 troops to South Carolina. They included 400 in four companies of the Royal Scots and a 700-man battalion of the Montgomerie's Highlanders. His second in command was Major James Grant. The regulars were joined by some 300 mounted Carolina rangers, in seven troops, and 100 militia, as well a party of 40 to 50 Catawba warriors, longtime competitors with the Cherokee.

The expedition was intended to subdue the Cherokee by razing their towns and crops, while relieving those posts besieged by the Cherokee, in particular, Fort Loudoun. In late May the British had reached Fort Ninety-Six. Montgomerie's campaign razed some of the Cherokee Lower Towns, including Keowee, Estatoe and Sugar Town, killing or capturing around 100 Indians. He relieved Fort Prince George, offering to parley with the Cherokee. But most of the warriors, having retreated to the Middle Towns, were no longer willing to negotiate. Montgomerie waited ten days before preparing to march on the Middle Towns, some sixty miles northeast. His forces had to travel over very difficult terrain, both mountainous and forested. He had to leave behind his wagon transport, which could not move beyond the Lower Towns, and use improvised panniers and packsaddles for the horses of the baggage train.

== Battle ==
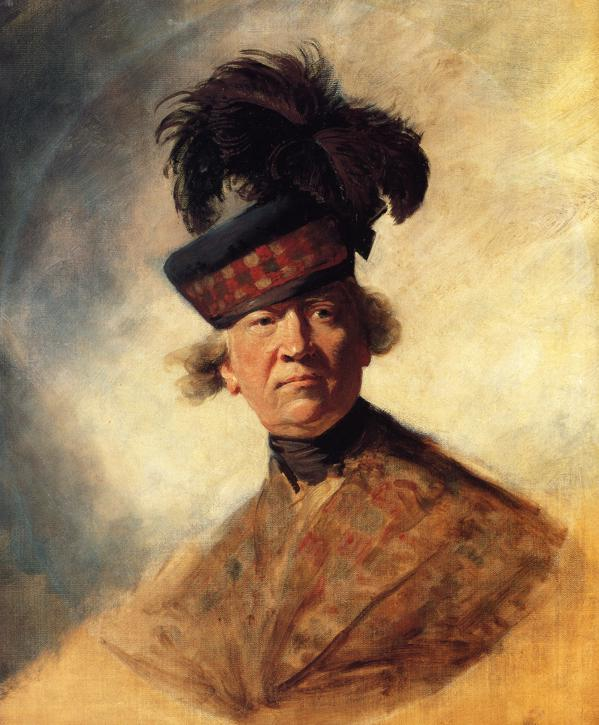
Archibald Montgomerie portrait by Joshua Reynolds.

At some five miles from Etchoe, the lowest town in the Cherokee's middle settlements, Montgomerie's advanced guard of a company of Rangers was ambushed in a deep valley. Captain Morrison and a number of his Rangers were killed. Many of the Cherokee were armed with rifles which had a longer and more accurate range than the muskets of the British. While accounts say the Cherokee took aimed shots, the British blazed away with ineffective platoon fire. Indian accounts told of the British standing in 'heaps' and being shot down like turkeys. The Rangers especially performed badly, with Lieutenant Grant reporting that some fifty deserted before the march, and the rest ran off when Morrison was killed.

The Grenadier and the Light infantry companies moved forward to support the Rangers, while the Royal Scots came forward on rising ground to the right of the Cherokee. The Royal Scots were thrown back into open ground by heavy rifle fire. They had to reform and fight off the Cherokee counter-attack. Montgomerie extended his line on the left with the Highlanders, who turned the Indian right. The Indians retired from this advance and came into contact with the Royal Scots in a brisk encounter. They retreated to a position on a hill from which they could not be dislodged. Montgomerie ordered an advance through the pass and on to the town, but some of the Cherokee ran to warn the inhabitants to leave. Some of the warriors had got around Montgomerie's flanks and attacked his pack animals and supply train, whose loss would cripple the army. This attack was eventually driven off.

Montgomerie had numerous seriously wounded men whom he could not leave behind, whether he advanced or retreated. Many of the pack animals were lost, further crippling his progress. He had to abandon the advance, along with a large quantity of supplies, in order to provide pack horses to transport the wounded to safety. The British force retreated to Fort Prince George. Montgomerie turned over supplies to the fort and left his most badly wounded. He continued his withdrawal to Charleston. While his expedition was partially successful in destroying the Cherokee Lower Towns and relieving Fort Prince George, he was forced to withdraw at the Middle Towns, and failed to relieve Fort Loudoun in Overhill country. By August he and his men sailed back to New York.

== Aftermath ==
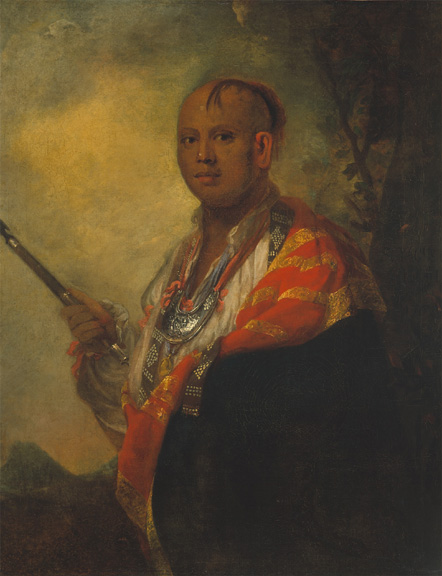
Portrait of Ostenaco by Sir Joshua Reynolds, 1762.

The failure to relieve Fort Loudon forced the garrison to surrender. The Cherokee allowed Captain Demeré and the garrison to retain their arms and enough ammunition to make the trip back to the South Carolina colony, provided they left the remaining arms and stores of ammunition to the Cherokee led by Ostenaco. The garrison marched out of the fort on August 9, with a Cherokee escort. When the Cherokee entered the fort, they found 10 bags of powder and ball buried, and the cannon and small arms thrown in the river to prevent their use. Angered by the broken agreement, the Cherokee went after the garrison. The next morning the escort had drifted off, and the garrison was attacked in the woods by perhaps 700 Indians. Some 22 soldiers, roughly equal to the number of Cherokee chief hostages killed at Fort Prince George, and 3 civilians were killed, and 120 taken prisoner. Residents of Charleston were panicked when they learned of these events. The British and Cherokee made a truce of six months, but failed to agree on peace.

After a difficult winter, despite the loss of the Lower Towns' harvest and a shortage of ammunition for hunting, as well as disease, Cherokee morale still remained high. But, Amherst had determined to launch a greater invasion of the Cherokee lands "to chastise the Cherokees [and] reduce them to the absolute necessity of suing for pardon". James Grant commanded more regulars: the 1st, 17th and 22nd Regiments, a war-party of Mohawk and Stockbridge Indian scouts, Catawba and Chickasaw warriors; a large number of provincials under Colonel Middleton, and rangers. The provincials included men who would gain fame during the American Revolution: William Moultrie, Charles Cotesworth Pinckney, and Francis Marion (known as the Swamp Fox). Grant's force was more than 2,800 strong. They were prepared for an extended campaign in the mountain and forest terrain, having a supply train a mile long, made up of 600 packhorses carrying a month's provisions, and a large herd of cattle managed by a few score enslaved African Americans.

Grant encountered 1,000 Cherokee warriors on June 10, 1761, near the site of the previous battle of Echoee. The Indians again ambushed the column, and concentrated on killing the pack animals. After six hours of long-range skirmishing, the Cherokee exhausted their limited ammunition and withdrew. Grant's force attacked and burned the fifteen Middle Towns, and all their crops. Grant expressly ordered the troops to summarily execute any Indian man, woman or child they captured. Although, by July, Grant had marched his men to exhaustion, and had 300 too sick to walk, he had wrecked the Cherokee economy. Some 4,000 residents of the Middle Towns were left homeless and starving. In August 1761 the Cherokee sued for peace. As a result of the war, Cherokee warrior strength, estimated at 5,000 before the war in 1739, was reduced by battle, smallpox and starvation to 2,300.

== Bibliography ==
- Anderson, Fred. Crucible of War: The Seven Years' War and the Fate of Empire in British North America, 1754–1766. New York: Knopf, 2000. ISBN 0-375-40642-5.
- Conley, Robert J..The Cherokee Nation: A History. Albuquerque: University of New Mexico Press, 2005, ISBN 978-0-8263-3236-3.
- Drake, Samuel Gardner. Biography and history of the Indians of North America, Boston, MDCCCLI.
- Fortescue J. W.. A History of the British Army. London: Macmillan, 1899, Vol. II.
- Hatley, Thomas. The Dividing Paths: Cherokees and South Carolinians through the Era of Revolution. New York: Oxford University Press, 1993.
- Mooney, James. Myths of the Cherokee and Sacred Formulas of the Cherokee. Nashville, Tenn.: Charles and Randy Elder-Booksellers, 1982.
- Oliphant, John. Peace and War on the Anglo-Cherokee Frontier, 1756–63. Baton Rouge, LA: Louisiana State University Press, 2001.
- Stewart, David, Major General. Sketches of the character, manners, and present state of the Highlanders, Vols 1 & 2. Edinburgh, 1825.
- Tortora, Daniel J. Carolina in Crisis: Cherokees, Colonists, and Slaves in the American Southeast, 1756–1763. Chapel Hill: University of North Carolina Press, 2015. ISBN 1-469-62122-3.
- Woodward, Grace Steele.The Cherokees. Norman: University of Oklahoma Press, 1963. ISBN 0-8061-1815-6.
