= Newry, South Carolina =

Census-designated place in South Carolina, United States

Newry
- CDP
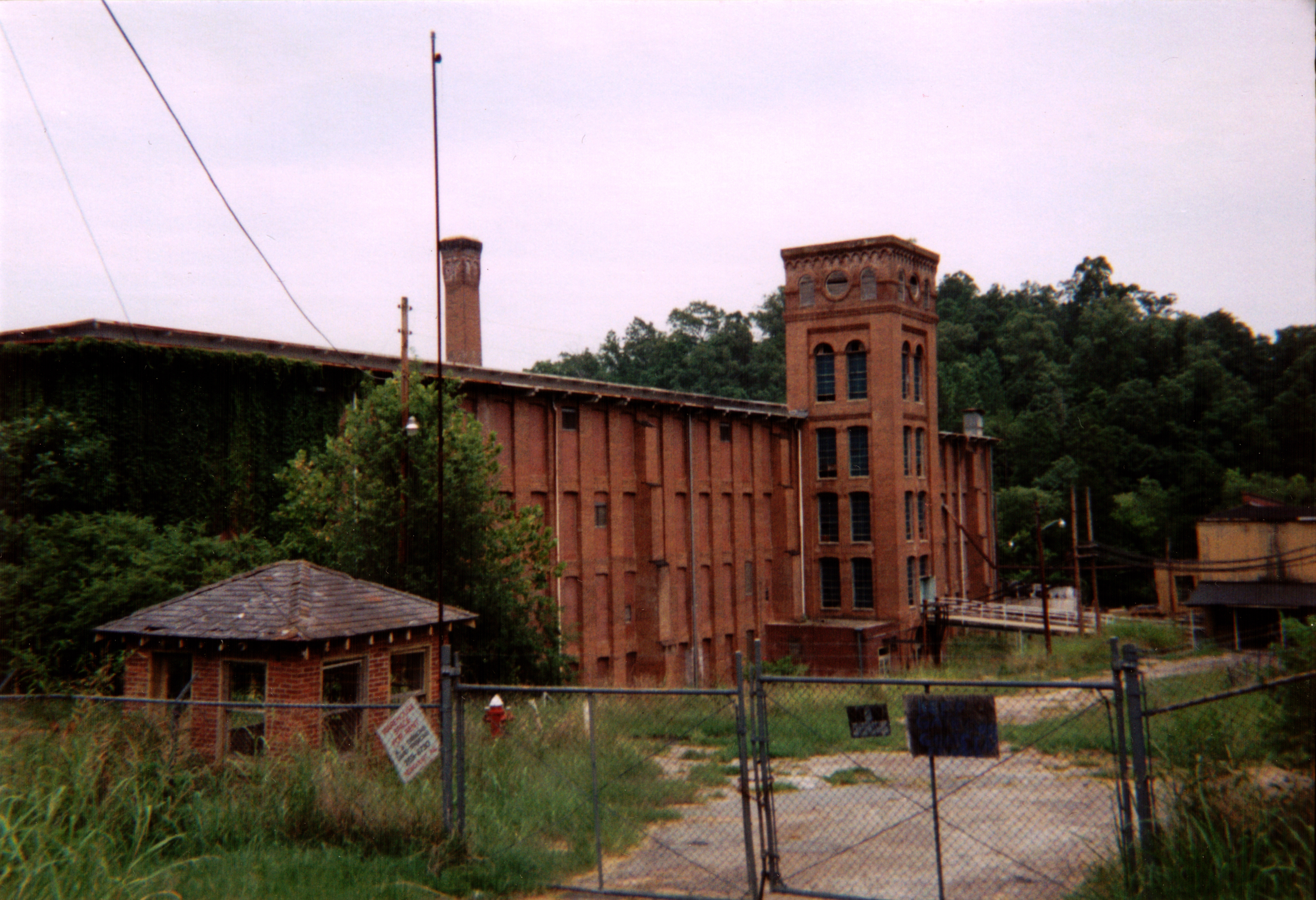
- Newry Mill

- Location in Oconee County and the state of South Carolina.
- Coordinates: 34°43′26″N 82°54′25″W
- Country: United States
- State: South Carolina
- County: Oconee

Area
  - Total: 0.30 sq mi (0.77 km^{2})
  - Land: 0.29 sq mi (0.76 km^{2})
  - Water: 0 sq mi (0.00 km^{2})
- Elevation: 830 ft (250 m)

Population (2020)
  - Total: 199
  - Density: 674.1/sq mi (260.26/km^{2})
- Time zone: UTC-5 (Eastern (EST))
  - Summer (DST): UTC-4 (EDT)
- ZIP code: 29665
- Area codes: 864, 821
- FIPS code: 45-49975
- GNIS feature ID: 2584533
- Newry Historic District
- U.S. National Register of Historic Places
- U.S. Historic district
- Location within South Carolina Location within the United States
- Location: Broadway, River Ridge Rd., South, Branch, and Palmetto Aves., Newry, South Carolina
- Coordinates: 34°43′28″N 82°54′32″W
- Area: 117 acres (47 ha)
- Built: 1893
- Architect: Whaley, W.B.S., et al.
- Architectural style: Late Gothic Revival
- NRHP reference No.: 82003897
- Added to NRHP: March 19, 1982

Newry is a census-designated place in Oconee County, South Carolina. According to the 2020 United States Census, the population of the CDP was 199.

== Demographics ==
Historical population
Census	Pop.	Note	%±
2010	172		—
2020	199		15.7%
U.S. Decennial Census

== Newry Historic District ==
The National Register of Historic Places also lists a historic district of Newry. The borders of the Historic District differ somewhat from the borders of the CDP.

== History ==
Captain William Ashmead Courtenay (1831-1908) served in Robert E. Lee's Army of Northern Virginia in the Civil War, and was the mayor of Charleston, South Carolina from 1879–1887. Courtenay and a group of investors formed the Courtenay Manufacturing Company in 1893 with an initial capitalization of $134,500. The company purchased 350 acres (1.4 km^{2}) of land along the Little River in Oconee County on June 1, 1893. The company dammed the Little River to power the mill constructed on the site. They also constructed a village of about 50 cottages, and the mill began manufacturing cotton cloth on June 14, 1894.

Captain Courtenay's father emigrated to the United States from Ireland in 1791. It is traditionally believed that Courtenay named the village after his ancestral home of Newry which was a small industrial village at the time. The company owned the houses in the town, expanded from the original 50 cottages to about 85 residences, two churches, and a combined post office and company store, during the period from 1893 to 1910. The mill was immediately profitable, giving its investors a 15% rate of return in its first year of operation.

Following Courtenay's death in 1908, his sons managed the mill until approximately 1920. In 1946, the Courtenay Manufacturing Company merged with Anderson Cotton Mills, Panola Mills, and Grendel Mills to form a corporation called Abney Mills. Abney Mills continued operations at the mill in Newry, but sold the houses of the community to their residents in 1959. In 1972, the earthen Little River Dam was constructed and Lake Keowee was filled. Newry's baseball field was destroyed to make way for the dam.

Abney Mills closed the Newry mill in July 1975. Some of the employees and town residents left to work at other Abney Mills factories. The village lost many residents.
