= Fort Dobbs (North Carolina) =

- U.S. National Register of Historic Places
- Detail of a 1770 map of North Carolina by John Collett depicting the locations of Fort Dobbs, the Yadkin and Catawba Rivers, and Salisbury.

- Location within North Carolina Location within the United States
- Nearest city: Statesville, North Carolina
- Coordinates: 35°49′18″N 80°53′42″W
- Area: 9.5 acres (3.8 ha; 0.0148 sq mi)
- Built: 1755–1756
- Architect: Arthur Dobbs,
- Architectural style: Log blockhouse
- MPS: Iredell County MRA (AD)
- NRHP reference No.: 70000458
- Added to NRHP: September 15, 1970

Fort Dobbs was an 18th-century fort in the Yadkin–Pee Dee River Basin region of the Province of North Carolina, near what is now Statesville in Iredell County. Used for frontier defense during and after the French and Indian War, the fort was built to protect the American settlers of the western frontier of North Carolina, and served as a vital outpost for soldiers. Fort Dobbs' primary structure was a blockhouse with log walls, surrounded by a shallow ditch, and by 1759, a palisade. It was intended to provide protection from French-allied Native Americans such as the Shawnee raids into western North Carolina.

The fort's name honored Arthur Dobbs, the Royal Governor of North Carolina from 1755 to 1765, who played a role in designing the fort and authorized its construction. Between 1756 and 1761, the fort was garrisoned by a variable number of soldiers, many of whom were sent to fight in Pennsylvania and the Ohio River Valley during the French and Indian War. On February 27, 1760, the fort was the site of an engagement between Cherokee warriors and Provincial soldiers that ended in a victory for the Provincials.

Fort Dobbs was abandoned in March, 1764, and disappeared from the landscape. Archaeology and historical research led to the discovery of the fort's exact location and probable appearance. The site on which the fort sat is now operated by North Carolina's Division of State Historic Sites and Properties as Fort Dobbs State Historic Site. The reconstruction of the fort was completed on September 21, 2019.

== Background ==
=== Settlement of the Carolina back-country ===
In 1747, approximately 100 men of suitable age to serve in the colonial militia lived in North Carolina west of present-day Hillsborough. Within three years, North Carolina's frontier population increased, driven by the immigration of Scots-Irish, England, and German settlers traveling from Pennsylvania on the Great Wagon Road. By 1754, six western counties—Orange, Granville, Johnston, Cumberland, Anson, and Rowan—held around 22,000 residents out of the colony's total population of 65,000.

=== Construction ===
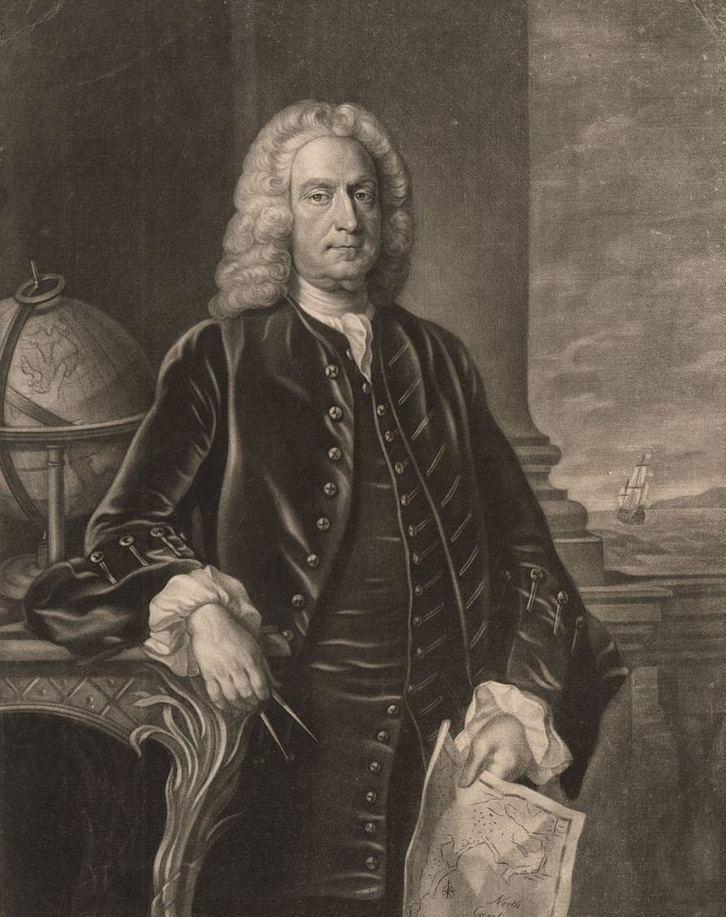
Portrait of Arthur Dobbs

In 1755, Governor Arthur Dobbs ordered the construction of a fortified log structure for the protection of settlers in Rowan County from French-allied Native American attacks, and as a barracks for the Provincial soldiers. Dobbs stated in a letter on August 24, 1755, to the Board of Trade that the fort was needed "to assist the back settlers and be a retreat to them as it was beyond the well settled Country, only straggling settlements behind them, and if I had placed [Waddell's garrison] beyond the Settlements without a fortification they might be exposed, and be no retreat for the Settlers, and the Indians might pass them and murder the Inhabitants, and retire before they durst go to give them notice". The new frontier settlements required regular protection. Furthermore, Governor Dobbs was concerned for his own investments, as he owned more than 200,000 acres (81,000 ha; 310 sq mi) of land on the Rocky River, approximately 40 miles (64 km) south of the Fourth Creek Meeting House.

The North Carolina Legislature set aside a sum of £1000 for the construction of the fort in October 1755. Provincial soldiers, known by the shortened name "Provincials", were soldiers raised, clothed, and paid by the individual thirteen colonies. The total cost of the fort was only £1,000. By comparison, Fort Stanwix in New York, begun in 1758 in a modern star fort style, cost £60,000 to erect, while the construction of Fort Prince George in South Carolina cost that province's House of Commons £3,000.

Dobbs likely had a role in designing the fort, as he had designed at least one other fort in North Carolina, as well as a number of structures in Ireland. Hugh Waddell, who had close ties to Governor Dobbs and commanded the "Frontier Company" of Provincial soldiers in 1755, oversaw construction of the fort. The land on which the fort was located was a part of a 560-acre (230 ha; 0.88 sq mi) tract owned first by one James Oliphant, then by a Fergus Sloan. Part of the same tract was used for the Fourth Creek Congregation Meeting House (so named because the settlement was on the fourth creek one would pass traveling west on the South Yadkin River from Salisbury) in 1755, which was the principal structure around which the modern city of Statesville was founded. After construction was completed, it was the only government-funded military installation on the colonial frontier between Virginia and South Carolina.

=== Description and effectiveness ===
By October 1756, Waddell had substantially completed construction on the fort. Francis Brown and future governor Richard Caswell, commissioners appointed by Dobbs to inspect frontier defenses, wrote the following report to the North Carolina General Assembly on December 21, 1756:

[Brown and Caswell] had likewise viewed the State of Fort Dobbs and found it to be a good and Substantial Building of the Dimentions [sic] following (that is to say) The Oblong Square fifty three feet by forty, the opposite Angles Twenty four feet and Twenty-Two In height Twenty four and a half feet as by the Plan annexed Appears, The Thickness of the Walls which are made of Oak Logs regularly Diminished from sixteen Inches to Six, it contains three floors and there may be discharged from each floor at one and the same time about one hundred Musketts [sic] the same is beautifully scituated [sic] in the fork of Fourth Creek a Branch of the Yadkin River. And that they also found under Command of Capt Hugh Waddel Forty six Effective men Officers and Soldiers as by the List to the said Report Annexed Appears the same being sworn to by the said Capt in their Presence the said Officers and Soldiers Appearing well and in good Spirits.

The commissioners generally found the defenses of the rest of the North Carolina frontier to be inadequate. In 1756, the North Carolina General Assembly petitioned King George II for assistance, stating that the frontier remained in a relatively defenseless state. The address to the king further noted that after the fall of Fort Oswego to the French and their native allies in that year, the legislators did not believe that Fort Dobbs would provide a substantial defensive advantage. Settlers west of the Yadkin River were subjected to regular attacks so that between 1756 and 1759, even after the construction of Fort Dobbs, the population of settlers in the area declined from approximately 1,500 to 800.

In 1759, Waddell brought additional swivel guns for use Of Fort Dobbs. Oral tradition in Iredell County holds that two brass guns were mounted at Fort Dobbs, but evidence of the exact quantity present at the fort has not been conclusively established.

== Use and conflict ==
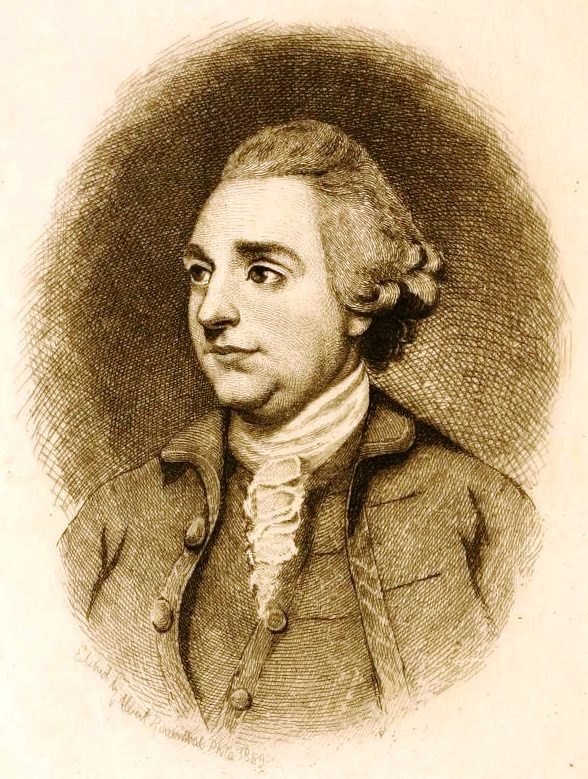
Hugh Waddell, the post commander

=== Early uses ===
Between 1756 and 1761, Fort Dobbs was used as a base of operations for Provincial soldiers. Dobbs also employed Waddell and the fort to conduct diplomacy with the province's native neighbors. The governor gave specific instructions on July 18, 1756, in a letter sent from New Bern to Waddell and two other men, stating:

I have given Orders to make you or any two of You a Commission as often as Necessary to go and make complaints to the Chief Sachims of the Cherokee and Catauba Nations when any Murders Robberies or Depredations are made by any of their People upon the English and to know whether it is done by their Orders or Allowance and if not to give up the Delinquents if Known or then when not Known that they should give Strict Orders to their Hnnters [sic] and warriors not to rob Kill or abuse the English Planters their Bretheren and Destroy their Horses cows Swine or Corn and if they should afterwards do it that the English their Bretheren would be Obliged to repell force with force and in Case they dont own to what Nation they belong that they will be treated as other Indian Nations in alliance with our Enemies the French who are now Spiriting them up to make war against us.

In addition to warning nearby natives against attacking settlers in the Carolinas, Dobbs also charged Waddell with attempting to keep peace with the Catawba. In one instance, Dobbs instructed Waddell to turn over a settler who had killed a Catawba hunter in order to placate the hunter's tribesmen, in the event assurances that the settler would be brought to justice under the province's laws did not persuade the Catawba to remain friendly with North Carolina.

In 1756, Dobbs also approved the construction of another fort, this time in lands claimed by the Catawba, as well as both Carolinas, near modern-day Fort Mill, South Carolina. Workmen under Waddell's command began construction in 1756, but in 1757, Catawba leaders, influenced by South Carolina Governor William Lyttelton, informed North Carolina's government that they no longer wished for this second fort to be built, and construction of the second fort was permanently halted.

The fort's garrison fluctuated yearly. Initially, a 50-man company under Captain Waddell manned the fort. The colony raised two fifty-man companies in 1756 for service on the frontier; Waddell's was to build the Catawba Fort, while Captain Andrew Bailey's garrisoned Fort Dobbs. With construction of the Catawba fort halted In mid-1757, Waddell's 50-man company was added to the garrison. 1758 saw all of North Carolina's troops sent to Pennsylvania to participate in the Forbes Campaign. The fort was garrisoned by two 30-man companies at the outbreak of the Anglo-Cherokee War in 1759. By the time of the February, 1760 attack on the fort, only one 30-man company was serving at Fort Dobbs.

=== Decline and fall of Anglo-Cherokee relations ===
During the Anglo-Cherokee War of 1759–1761, the fort served as the base for a soldiers tasked with repelling Cherokee raids in the western portion of the province. The Anglo-Cherokee War began in 1759 after the capture of Fort Duquesne by the British and their native allies, including the Cherokee. The Cherokee had felt slighted by General Forbes's inept diplomacy. The Cherokee wished to be treated as allies, while Forbes treated them like enlisted soldiers. Additionally, as many as 40 Cherokee were murdered by Virginia militia in the area around modern-day Roanoke, Virginia. Some of the Virginians attempted to sell the massacred Cherokee warriors' scalps to the government of Virginia as the scalps of Shawnee warriors (for which the Virginian Assembly had set a bounty), an act that infuriated the Cherokee. When they returned home, the Lower Settlement Cherokee discovered that settlers encroached well beyond the border established between Cherokee and South Carolina that had been set by the 1747 treaty at Long Cane Creek (west of modern-day Greenwood, South Carolina). This elevated Cherokee concern that vital hunting grounds would be permanently lost.

In addition to the murders in Virginia, settlers in both North and South Carolina murdered Cherokee men and women. In one instance, a North Carolina hunter named Hamilton and his friend encountered two Cherokee hunters on Brushy Mountains (North Carolina). Hamilton invited the Cherokee to camp with him. While they slept, Hamilton and his friend butchered the Cherokee hunters with axes. They then murdered a white settler, then claimed they killed the two responsible Cherokee.

All the while, a few pro-French Cherokee leaders and Creek agitators pushed for violent actions against American settlers, despite the opposition of several Cherokee leaders.

=== War comes to Fourth Creek ===
In order to obtain justice for their brethren murdered in late 1758 and early 1759, Cherokee warriors attacked settlements on the Yadkin and Catawba Rivers against the wishes of Cherokee leaders such as Attakullakulla. In April and May, 1759, as many as 40 men, women and children were killed, and many scalped. Several lived in the Fourth Creek Settlement, within 10 miles of Fort Dobbs. This violence damaged peace talks between Attakullakulla and South Carolina governor William Lyttelton. The violence committed by the Cherokee against American settlers continued, which in turn caused the colonial authorities to seek better relations with the Creek and Catawba nations. The Catawba, who were allied to the provinces of North and South Carolina, were only able to provide minimal assistance to the settlers, as that tribe had been decimated by smallpox in 1759 and early 1760.

All remaining goodwill was lost between Lyttelton's government in Charleston, the North Carolinan government, and the pro-peace Cherokee when Lyttelton ordered the detention of several peace delegations led by headmen Oconostota, Tistoe, and Round O, despite having previously guaranteed them safe passage. Lyttelton had the delegations shackled, put under armed guard, and secured them at Fort Prince George. A peace arrangement was agreed upon in December, 1759, although the Cherokee agreed under duress, and the pro-war faction of the Cherokee did not obey its terms. Several of the signatories for the Cherokee intended to disavow their promises as soon as they were able, in order to seek retribution for the capture of their peace delegations.

Full-blown war broke out across the Carolina frontier by January, 1760. Ensigns Coytmore and Bell of Fort Prince George, along with some soldiers, raped several Cherokee women in Estatoe, including the wife of Seroweh, a pro-peace leader. Between January and February, 1760, nearly 100 settlers on the Carolina frontier were killed by Cherokee war parties, and the settlement boundaries of both Carolinas had been effectively pushed back by more than 100 miles. Many of the Cherokee captives held at Fort Prince George were murdered in their jail cells in mid-February, 1760 after an attempt was made to rescue them. Coytmore, the commanding officer of that fort who was much maligned by the Cherokee, was killed. Lyttelton, who was soon appointed Governor of Jamaica, requested assistance from Dobbs, but North Carolina's militia could not be convinced to serve outside of its home province due to long-standing custom.

=== Battle ===
The fort's sole engagement occurred when a band of Cherokee warriors attacked on the night of February 27, 1760. Waddell described the action in an official report to the Governor on February 29, 1760:

For several days I observed that a small party of Indians were constantly about the fort, I sent out several small parties after them to no purpose, the evening before last between 8 and 9 o'clock I found by the dogs making an uncommon noise there must be a party nigh a spring which we sometimes use. As my garrison is but small, and I was apprehensive it might be a scheme to draw out the garrison, I took out Captain Bailie who with myself and party made up ten; we had not marched 300 yards from the fort when we were attacked by at least 60 or 70 Indians. I had given my party orders not to fire until I gave the word, which they punctually observed: we received the Indians [sic] fire: when I perceived they had almost all fired, I ordered my party to fire which we did not further than 12 steps each loaded with a bullet and seven buck shot, they had nothing to cover them as they were advancing either to tomahawk or make us prisoners: they found the fire very hot from so small a number which a good deal confused them; I then ordered my party to retreat, as I found the instant our skirmish began another party had attacked the fort, upon our reinforcing the garrison the Indians were soon repulsed with I am sure a considerable loss, from what I myself saw as well as those I can confide in they could not have had less than 10 or 12 killed or wounded, and I believe they have taken six of my horses to carry off their wounded ... On my side I had 2 men wounded one of whom I am afraid will die as he is scalped, the other is in a way of recovery and one boy killed near the fort whom they durst not advance to scalp. I expected they would have paid me another visit last night, as they attack all fortifications by night, but they did not like their reception.

At around the same time as this attack occurred, Cherokee war parties attacked Fort Loudoun, Fort Prince George, and Ninety-Six, South Carolina. After this wave, Cherokee war parties continued to threaten Bethabara in the Wachovia Tract, Salisbury, and other settlements in the Yadkin, Catawba, Dan River, and Broad river basins.

The frontier became quiet in May, 1760. Colonel Archibald Montgomerie, 11th Earl of Eglinton led a force of 1,737 British troops on a punitive campaign against the Cherokee. Hampered by South Carolina's unwillingness to assist, his troops slowly made their way west, attacking and burning 10 Cherokee towns between June 2 and 3rd. He sought to negotiate a peace with the Cherokee, but was undermined by a local trader. On July 24, Montgomerie's troops began their march north, and were defeated three days later at the Battle of Echoee.

The following year, in 1761, North Carolina's General Assembly voted to raise a regiment of 500 soldiers. These men were to join Virginia Provincials in south western Virginia for a joint campaign against the Cherokee Overhill Towns. Simultaneously, Lt Col. James Grant, 4th of Ballindalloch led a force of nearly 2,800 British regulars, South Carolina provincials, and British-allied Indians in a second attack of the Cherokee Middle Settlements. Grant's campaign burned 18 Cherokee towns between June 10 and July 3, 1761. The settlements, fields, and crop stores of approximately 5,000 Cherokee were burnt during the campaign.

The North Carolina Provincial Regiment, numbering 400 men, arrived in Salisbury by July. However, the Regiment did not receive their uniforms and weapons until September while at Fort Dobbs. The troops finally joined Virginians at the Long Island (Tennessee) in October, 1761. However, the destruction of Grant's Campaign forced the Cherokee to sue for peace, making the second invasion pointless.

=== Post-war history ===
With the Anglo-Cherokee War ended, North Carolina refused to fund troops to garrison Fort Dobbs. Walter Lindsay, a former lieutenant at Ft Dobbs and later a local militia captain, served as caretaker for the fort. He and his assistants ensured the fort and its stockpile of arms were maintained for use should the need arise. As time passed, the frontier of North Carolina continued to push westward. On March 7, 1764, the North Carolina General Assembly's Committee on Public Claims recommended to Governor Dobbs that stores and supplies be removed from the fort to spare the government further expense in upkeep. In 1766, the fort was described as rotting and collapsing.

== Site preservation and archaeology ==
Archaeological exploration of the site first occurred in 1847, when a group of local residents attempted to locate a rumored original cannon on the site. Evidence of this dig was discovered in the 21st century in a later archaeological study. In 1909, local residents established the Fort Dobbs Chapter of the Daughters of the American Revolution. That same year, the owners of the parcel of land on which the Fort Dobbs site was located donated 1,000 square feet (93 m^{2}) containing the fort's believed location to the Fort Dobbs Chapter. By 1910, the Chapter erected a stone marker at the site. In 1915, it purchased the 9.9 acres of land surrounding the original donated parcel. The DAR built a two room cabin to serve as their meeting space and visitor center. The logs for construction were donated from houses on the nearby John Hill Summers Farm.

In 1969, the North Carolina General Assembly appropriated $15,000 to purchase the property, to be matched by funds raised locally by the Iredell County Historical Society; these purchases were made in 1973 and 1974. Initially, the Talley Family sold 11.4 acres to the state and donated an additional 2.08 acres in memory of Mary Colvert Talley. Another 8.22 acres was obtained through a judgement against the Hatchett family in 1974. By 1976, the land was opened as a historic site.

Fort Dobbs State Historic Site was North Carolina's seventeenth historic site. The grand opening was supposed to occur on July 4, 1976 was postponed by heavy rains. The celebration occurred on September 4, 1976. It included speeches, clogging, live bluegrass, and a musical production: "Fort Dobbs: A Musical Drama."

By 2006, archaeologists and historical researchers had determined the exact location of Fort Dobbs, and had located the post-hole foundations of the former log structure. Excavation began in 1967, and by 1968, the site of the fort was confirmed. In 1967, Stanley South, an archaeologist and proponent of processual archaeology, discovered that by overlaying a transparency depicting a survey of the Fort Dobbs site done in the mid-18th-century on a modern aerial photograph, evidence of the surveyed lines could still be discerned in the modern terrain. Additionally, excavations revealed a moat that surrounded the blockhouse, as well as trash in the moat contemporary with the fort. Early archaeological work concentrated specifically on the moat and a depression called the "cellar", which South believed served as a storage space in the middle of the fort grounds, and which later researchers believe was directly underneath the blockhouse. Archaeological work has unearthed evidence of a palisade surrounding the blockhouse, in a similar fashion to other French and Indian War-era forts such as Fort Shirley near Heath, Massachusetts, and Fort Prince George.

In 2006, a researcher affiliated with East Carolina University, Lawrence Babits, presented a study and a reconstruction plan that has been accepted by the Friends of Fort Dobbs, the 501(c)(3) nonprofit organization that supports the site, and the North Carolina Department of Cultural Resources. In his plan, Babits postulated that Dobbs most likely played a role in designing the fort, basing the design on forts with which Dobbs had first-hand experience as an administrator in Scotland, such as Bernera Barracks near Glenelg and Ruthven Barracks near Kingussie. From these comparisons, the contemporary description of the fort, and the soil record, Babits concluded that the "opposite angles" described by Francis Brown in 1756 actually referred to "flankers", or square wooden structures attached to the corner of the fort that would have allowed defending soldiers to shoot into the flank of any attacking forces surrounding the building.

== Historic site ==
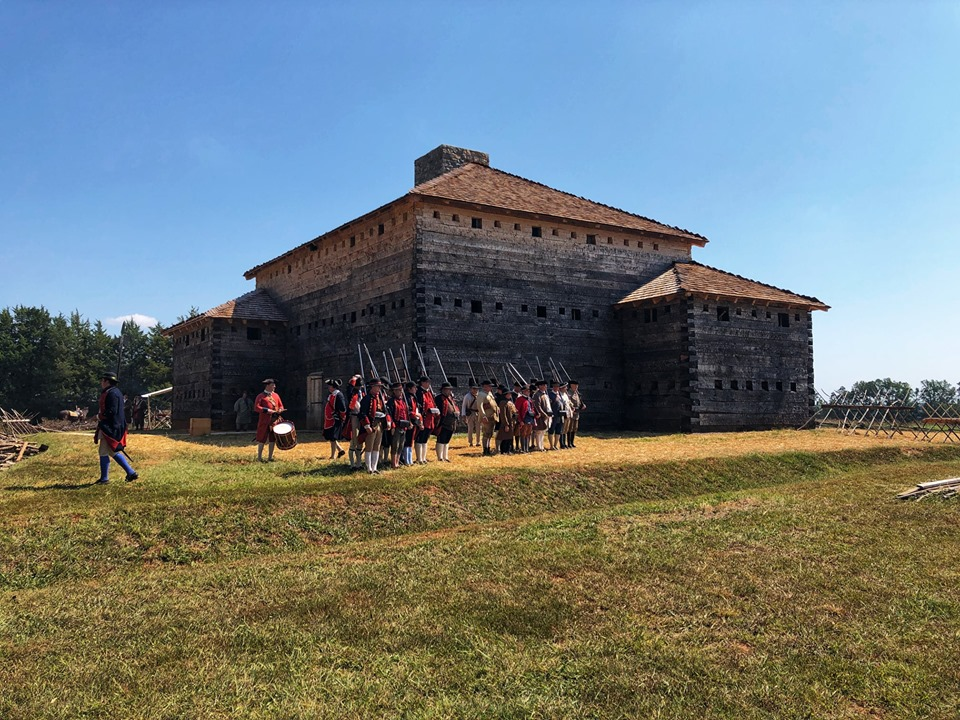
Fort Dobbs Reconstruction

The State of North Carolina Department of Natural and Cultural Resources maintains and operates the area as Fort Dobbs State Historic Site. The visitor center, located in a log cabin constructed from parts of local, 19th-century log structures, features displays about both the colonial fort and the French and Indian War period. Outdoor trails lead visitors through the excavated ruins of the fort. Events, including many living history demonstrations, are held throughout the year at the fort. The Fort Dobbs site remains the only historic site in the state related to the French and Indian War.

Between 2016 and 2019, Fort Dobbs was reconstructed following a fundraising campaign by the Friends of Fort Dobbs, a non profit organization which supports Fort Dobbs State Historic Site. The Grand Opening on September 21, 2019, was attended by nearly 2000 visitors. The replica is fully furnished to appear as though soldiers walked out just before visitors walked in.

Yearly attendance at the site is about 20,000 people. The staff offers guided tours year round, Tuesday - Saturday. Several times a year, the site hosts living history events exploring the lives of the soldiers, civilians, and Native Americans whose lives crossed on the hilltop more than two and a half centuries ago.

== See also ==
- Colonial American military history
- Fort Johnston (North Carolina) – contemporary colonial North Carolina fort
- French and Indian Wars
- Rowan County Regiment
