= Richland, South Carolina =

- Unincorporated community
- Location within South Carolina Location within the United States
- Coordinates: 34°40′40″N 83°01′32″W
- Country: United States
- State: South Carolina
- County: Oconee
- Elevation: 804 ft (245 m)
- Time zone: UTC-5 (Eastern (EST))
  - Summer (DST): UTC-4 (EDT)
- ZIP code: 29675
- Area codes: 864, 821
- GNIS feature ID: 1231726

Richland is an unincorporated community in Oconee County, South Carolina, United States. The community is located along the Norfolk Southern Railway 4.2 miles (6.8 km) west of Seneca. Richland has a post office with ZIP code 29675.
