= Anglo-Cherokee War =

Conflict between British forces and Cherokee bands in North America from 1758 to 1761

- Part of the French and Indian War and Seven Years' War
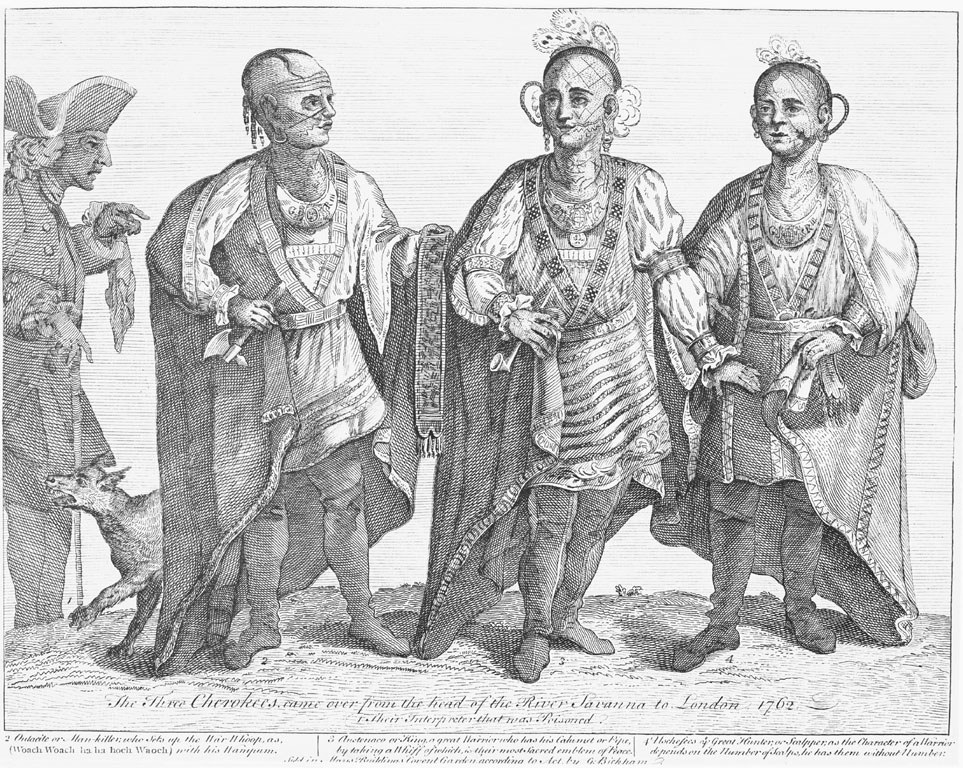
- After the Anglo-Cherokee War, bitterness remained between the two groups. In 1762, Henry Timberlake took three of the former Cherokee adversaries to London to help cement the newly declared friendship
Date	1758–1761
Location	present-day South Carolina, North Carolina, and Tennessee
Result	British victory

Belligerents
Cherokee	Great Britain

Commanders and leaders
Attakullakulla; Oconostota; Ostenaco; Seroweh	William Lyttelton; Archibald Montgomerie (WIA); James Grant; Paul Demeré (POW)

Casualties and losses
48 killed At least 5 wounded	43 killed 78 wounded 120 captured

The Anglo-Cherokee War (1758–1761; in the Cherokee language: the "war with those in the red coats" or "War with the English"), was also known from the Anglo-European perspective as the Cherokee War, the Cherokee Uprising, or the Cherokee Rebellion. The war was a conflict between British forces in North America and Cherokee bands during the French and Indian War.

The British and the Cherokee had been allies at the start of the war, but each party had suspected the other of betrayals. Tensions between British-American settlers and Cherokee warriors of towns that the pioneers encroached on had increased during the 1750s, culminating in open hostilities in 1758.

== Background ==
After siding with the Province of Carolina in the Tuscarora War of 1711–15, the Cherokee had turned on their British allies at the outbreak of the Yamasee War of 1715–17. Midway through the war, they switched sides and allied again with the British, ensuring the defeat of the Yamasee. The Cherokee remained allies of the British until the French and Indian War.

At the 1754 outbreak of the war, Cherokee warriors took part in British campaigns against the French Fort Duquesne (at present-day Pittsburgh, Pennsylvania) and the Shawnee of the Ohio Country. In 1755, a band of 130 Cherokee under Ostenaco (or Ustanakwa) of Tamali (Tomotley) became the garrison in a fortified town at the mouth of the Ohio River at the behest of the Iroquois League (most of these Six Nations were also British allies).

For several years, French agents from Fort Toulouse had been visiting the Overhill Cherokee on the Hiwassee and Tellico rivers and had made inroads into those places. The strongest pro-French Cherokee leaders were Mankiller (Utsidihi) of Talikwa (Tellico Plains), Old Caesar of Chatuga (or Tsatugi, Chatooga), and Raven (Kalanu) of Ayuhwasi (Hiwassee). The "First Beloved Man" (or Uku) of the nation, Conocotocko (called "Old Hop"), was pro-French, as was his nephew, Conockotocko ("Standing Turkey"), who succeeded him after the death of the elder man in 1760.

The former site of the Coosa chiefdom had been abandoned for some time. It was reoccupied in 1759 by a Muscogee contingent under Big Mortar (Yayatustanage) in support of the pro-French Cherokee residing in Great Tellico and Chatuga. This was a step toward Yayatustanage's planned alliance of Muscogee, Cherokee, Shawnee, Chickasaw, and Catawba peoples (which would have been the first of its kind in the South). Although such an alliance was not organized until the days of Dragging Canoe, Big Mortar still rose to become leading chief of Muscogee bands after the French and Indian War.

== Prelude ==
The Anglo-Cherokee War broke out in 1758 when the Virginia militia attacked Moytoy (Amo-adawehi) of Citico in retaliation for the alleged theft of some horses by the Cherokee. Moytoy led retaliatory raids against colonial towns along the Yadkin and Catawba rivers in North Carolina. This began rounds of retaliation. After 16 Cherokee hostages at Fort Prince George near Keowee were killed by the panicked garrison during an attempt to move them, the Cherokee attacked and massacred the British garrison of Fort Loudoun near Chota (Itsati).

This conflict did not end until 1761. The Cherokee were led by Aganstata of Chota, Attakullakulla (Atagulgalu) of Tanasi, Ostenaco of Tomotley, Wauhatchie (Wayatsi) of the Lower Towns, and Round O of the Middle Towns. During the second year of the French and Indian War, the British had sought Cherokee assistance against the French and their Indian allies. The British had reports, which proved accurate, that indicated the French were planning to build forts in Cherokee territory. (They had already built Fort Charleville at Great Salt Lick (now Nashville) on the Cumberland River); Fort Toulouse near present-day Montgomery, Alabama; Fort Rosalie at Natchez, Mississippi; Fort St. Pierre at modern-day Yazoo City, Mississippi; and Fort Tombeckbe on the Tombigbee River), extending their reach from some of their colonial settlements along the Gulf Coast.

Once the Cherokee agreed to be their allies, the British hastened to build forts of their own in Cherokee lands, completing Fort Prince George near Keowee in South Carolina (among the Lower Towns); and Fort Loudoun in 1756. Once the forts were built, the Cherokee raised close to 700 warriors to fight in western Colony of Virginia under Ostenaco. Oconostota and Attakullakulla led another large group to attack Fort Toulouse. In 1758, the Cherokee participated in the taking of Fort Duquesne. However, they felt their efforts were unappreciated. While traveling through Virginia on their way home, several Cherokee were murdered by Virginians. The Cherokee had been promised supplies but misunderstood where they were to get them from. After the Cherokee took some horses they believed were rightly theirs, several Virginians killed and scalped between 30 and 40 of the Cherokee warriors. Later, the Virginians claimed bounties for the scalps, saying they were Shawnee.

== War ==
While some Cherokee leaders still called for peace, a few led retaliatory raids on outlying English pioneer settlements. A number of Muskogee under Big Mortar moved up to Coosawatie. These people had long been French allies in support of the Cherokee pro-French faction centered in Great Tellico.

South Carolina Governor William Henry Lyttelton embargoed all gunpowder shipments to the Cherokee and raised an army of 1,100 men which marched to confront the Lower Towns of the Cherokee. Desperate for ammunition for their fall and winter hunts, the nation sent a delegation of moderate chiefs to negotiate. The 38 chiefs were taken prisoner as hostages and sent to Fort Prince George, escorted by the provincial army. Lyttleton thought this would ensure peace.

Lyttleton returned to Charleston, but the Cherokee were angry and began to attack frontier settlements into 1760. In February 1760, they attacked Fort Prince George in an attempt to rescue their hostages. The fort's commander was killed. His replacement massacred all of the hostages and fended off the attack. This resulted in the Cherokee declaring open war against the British colonies. The Cherokee also attacked Fort Ninety Six, but it withstood the siege.

By February 1760, the Cherokee expanded their retaliatory campaign into North Carolina, as far east as modern day Winston-Salem. An attack on Fort Dobbs in North Carolina was repulsed by Colonel Hugh Waddell. However, lesser settlements in the North and South Carolina back-country quickly fell to Cherokee raids.

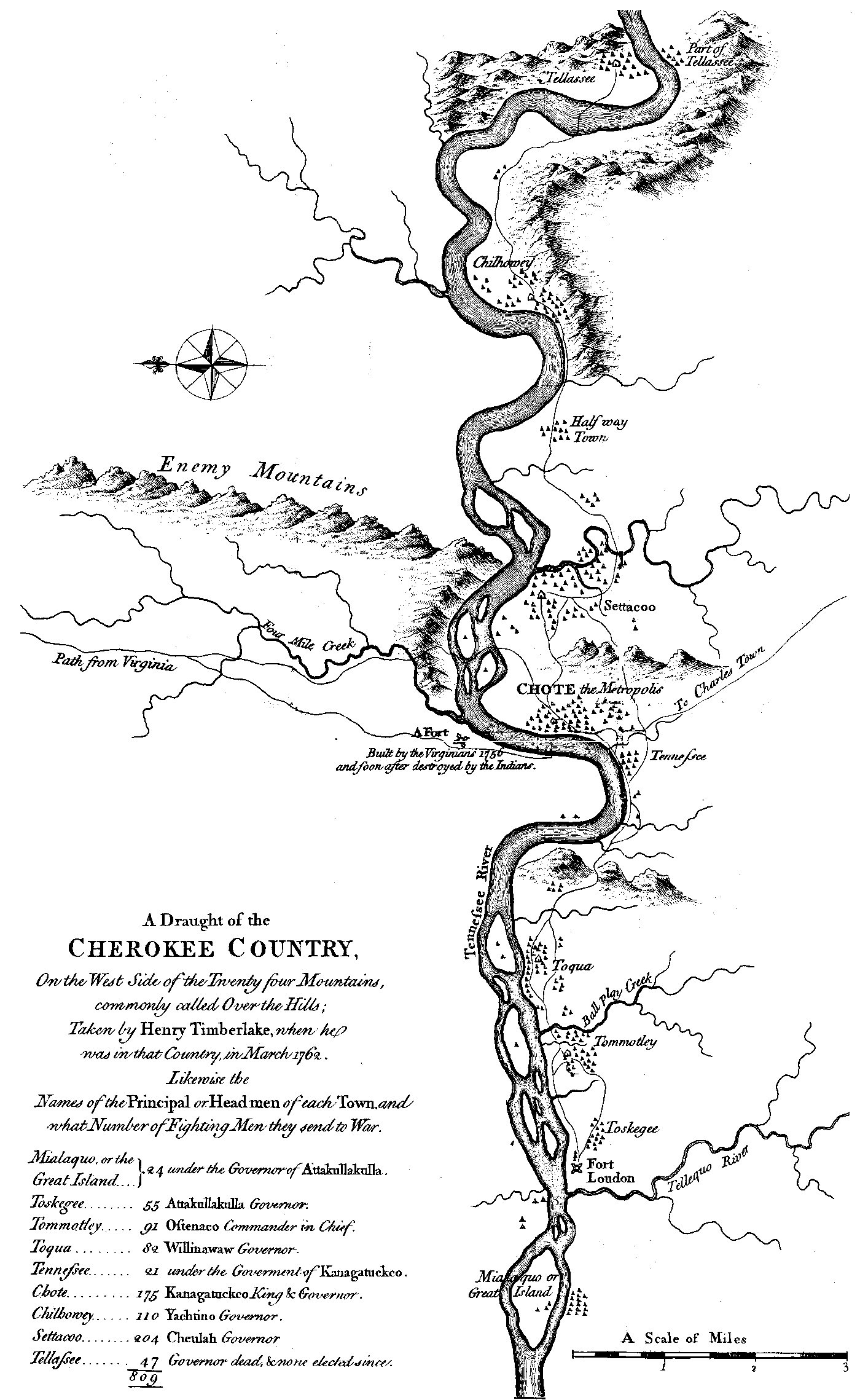
Timberlake's "Draught of the Cherokee Country"

Lyttleton appealed for help to Jeffery Amherst, the British commander in North America. Amherst sent Archibald Montgomerie with an army of 1,200 troops (the Royal Scots and Montgomerie's Highlanders) to South Carolina. Montgomerie's campaign razed 10 Cherokee Lower Towns, including Keowee. It ended with a defeat at Echoee (Itseyi) Pass when Montgomerie tried to enter the Middle Towns territory. Later in 1760, the Overhill Cherokee defeated the British colonists at a siege of Fort Loudoun and took it over.

In 1761, a second expedition against the Cherokee under James Grant was planned. He led an army of 2,800 men (the largest force to enter the southern Appalachians to date) against the Cherokee. His army moved through the Lower Towns, defeated the Cherokee at Echoee Pass, and proceeded to raze about 18 Middle Towns while burning fields of crops along the way. The army of British Regulars, Provincial Soldiers, and allied Catawba, Chickasaw, Mohawk, and Stockbridge Indians destroyed the homes and food of approximately 5,000 Cherokee people.

== Treaties ==
In November 1761, the Cherokee signed the Treaty of Long Island on the Holston with the Colony of Virginia. They made peace with South Carolina in December with the Treaty of Charlestown. During the Timberlake Expedition, Lt. Henry Timberlake, Sgt. Thomas Sumter, John McCormack (who served as their interpreter), and an unknown servant traveled into the Overhill settlements area to deliver a copy of the treaty with Virginia to the Cherokee. Timberlake's diary and map of his journey (see above), were published in 1765. His diary contained what historians assessed was an accurate description of Cherokee culture.

Pro-French leader Standing Turkey was deposed and replaced as "First Beloved Man" with the pro-British Attakullakulla. John Stuart became British Superintendent of Indian Affairs for the Southern District, based out of Charlestown, South Carolina, and was the main liaison between the Cherokee and the British government. His first deputy, Alexander Cameron, lived among the Cherokee, first at Keowee, then at Toqua on the Little Tennessee River, while his second deputy, John McDonald, resided a hundred miles to the southwest on the west side of Chickamauga Creek where it was crossed by the Great Indian Warpath.

During the war, many Cherokee towns had been destroyed under General Grant and were never reoccupied. The most notable of these was Kituwa, the inhabitants of which migrated west, taking up residence at Great Island Town (on the Little Tennessee), living among the Overhill Cherokee. As a result of the war, Cherokee warrior strength estimated at 2,590 before the war in 1755 was reduced by battle, smallpox and starvation to 2,300.

== Aftermath ==
In the aftermath of the war, French Louisiana east of the Mississippi went to the British, along with Canada, while Louisiana west of the Mississippi went to Spain; in return, Spanish Florida went to Britain, which divided it into East Florida and West Florida.

After the signing of the treaties and the conclusion of the Timberlake Expedition, Henry Timberlake visited London with three Cherokee leaders: Ostenaco, Standing Turkey, and Wood Pigeon (Ata-wayi). The Cherokee guests visited the Tower of London, met the playwright Oliver Goldsmith, drew massive crowds, and had an audience with King George III. On the voyage to England, their interpreter William Shorey died. This made communication nearly impossible.

Hearing of the Cherokees' warm welcome in London, South Carolinians viewed their reception as a sign of imperial favoritism at the colonists' expense, especially in view of the Royal Proclamation of 1763 (which prohibited settlement west of the Appalachian Mountains), and was a foundation of one of the major irritants for the colonials leading up to the American Revolution.

== See also ==
- Cherokee–American wars
