= Chickasaw Point, South Carolina =

Census-designated place in South Carolina, United States

- Census-designated place
- Location within South Carolina Location within the United States
- Coordinates: 34°32′9″N 83°4′31″W
- Country: United States
- State: South Carolina
- County: Oconee

Area
  - Total: 3.05 sq mi (7.89 km^{2})
  - Land: 2.19 sq mi (5.66 km^{2})
  - Water: 0.86 sq mi (2.23 km^{2})
- Elevation: 794 ft (242 m)

Population (2020)
  - Total: 718
  - Density: 328.5/sq mi (126.85/km^{2})
- Time zone: UTC-5 (Eastern (EST))
  - Summer (DST): UTC-4 (EDT)
- ZIP Code: 29693 (Westminster)
- Area codes: 864, 821
- FIPS code: 45-14230
- GNIS feature ID: 2812984

Chickasaw Point is a lakeside community and census-designated place (CDP) in Oconee County, South Carolina, United States. It was first listed as a CDP prior to the 2020 census. The population as of 2020 was 718.

The CDP is in southern Oconee County, on the northeast shores of Lake Hartwell, a reservoir on the Tugaloo and Savannah rivers. It is bordered to the northeast by the community of South Union. The center of the reservoir is the Georgia state line.

Chickasaw Point is 13 miles (21 km) southwest of Seneca and 11 miles (18 km) south of Westminster. It is 5 miles (8 km) northwest of South Carolina Exit 1 on Interstate 85.

== Demographics ==
Historical population
Census	Pop.	Note	%±
2020	718		—
U.S. Decennial Census; 2020

Chickasaw Point first appeared as a census designated place in the 2020 U.S. census.

=== 2020 census ===
Chickasaw Point CDP, South Carolina – Demographic Profile (NH = Non-Hispanic)
Race / Ethnicity	Pop 2020	% 2020
White alone (NH)	675	94.01%
Black or African American alone (NH)	4	0.56%
Native American or Alaska Native alone (NH)	0	0.00%
Asian alone (NH)	0	0.00%
Pacific Islander alone (NH)	0	0.00%
Some Other Race alone (NH)	0	0.00%
Mixed Race/Multi-Racial (NH)	30	4.18%
Hispanic or Latino (any race)	9	1.25%
Total	718	100.00%

Note: the US Census treats Hispanic/Latino as an ethnic category. This table excludes Latinos from the racial categories and assigns them to a separate category. Hispanics/Latinos can be of any race.
