= Oconee Nuclear Station =

Power station in South Carolina, US

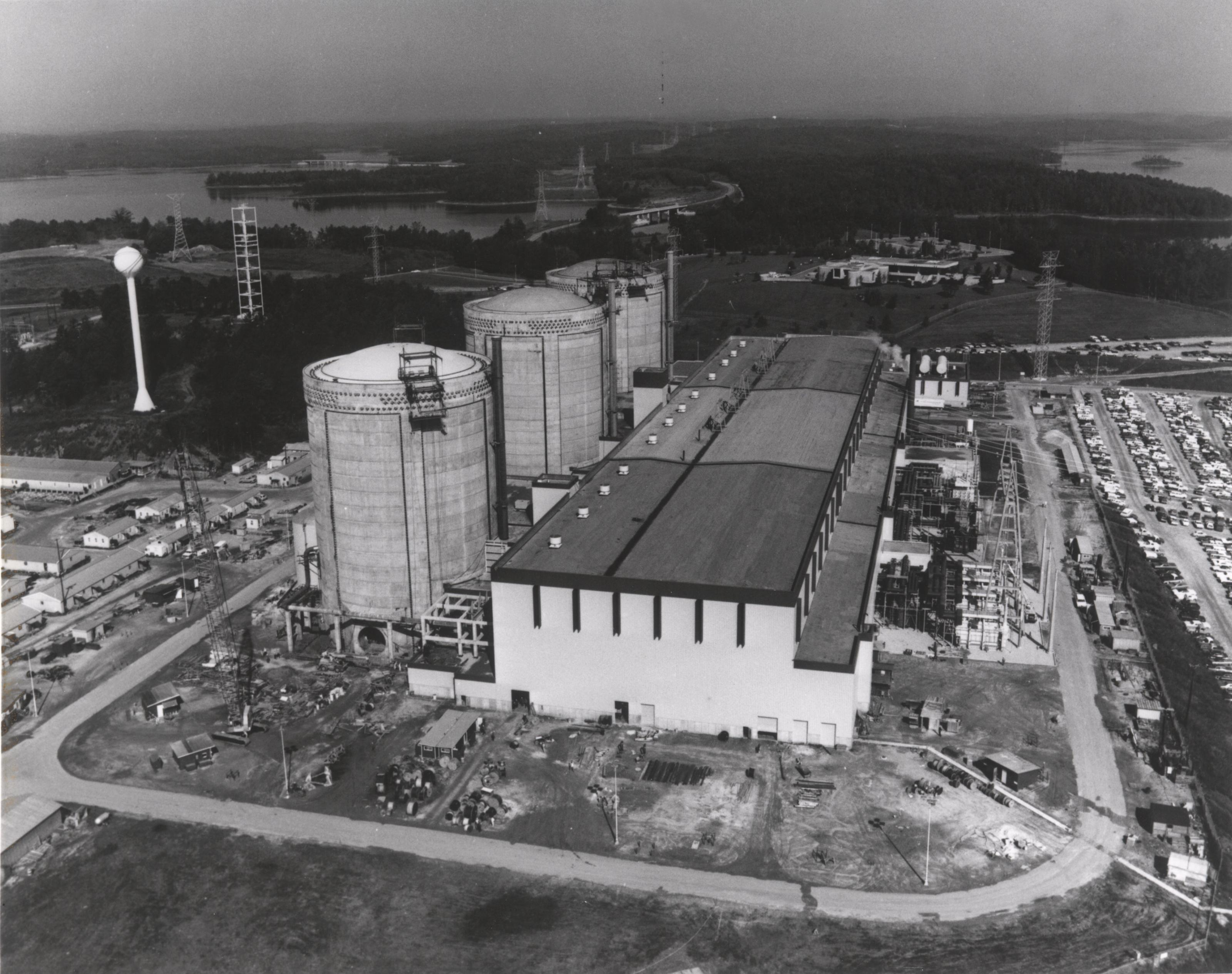
- Oconee Nuclear Station
- Country: United States
- Location: Oconee County, near Seneca, South Carolina
- Coordinates: 34°47′38″N 82°53′53″W
- Status: Operational
- Construction began: November 6, 1967; 58 years ago
- Commission date: Unit 1: July 15, 1973; 53 years ago Unit 2: September 9, 1974; 52 years ago Unit 3: December 16, 1974; 51 years ago
- Construction cost: $1.961 billion (2007 USD)
- Owner: Duke Energy
- Operator: Duke Energy

Nuclear power station
- Reactor type: PWR
- Reactor supplier: Babcock & Wilcox
- Cooling source: Lake Keowee
- Thermal capacity: 3 × 2610 MW_{th}

Power generation
- Units operational: 1 × 847 MW; 1 × 848 MW; 1 × 859 MW
- Make and model: B&W LLP (DRYAMB)
- Nameplate capacity: 2554 MW
- Capacity factor: 97.43% (2017); 81.20% (lifetime)
- Annual net output: 22,206 GWh (2021)

External links
- Commons: Related media on Commons

The Oconee Nuclear Station is a nuclear power station located on Lake Keowee near Seneca, South Carolina, and has a power output capacity of over 2,500 megawatts. It is the second nuclear power station in the United States to have its operating license extended for an additional twenty years by the Nuclear Regulatory Commission (NRC) (the application for the Calvert Cliffs Nuclear Power Plant in Maryland preceded it).

This plant has three Babcock & Wilcox pressurized water reactors, and is operated by Duke Energy.

In April 2025 all three units have received licenses to operate 80 years (1st until February 2053, 2nd until October 2053, 3rd until July 2054).

== History ==
Oconee was the first of three nuclear stations built by Duke Energy. According to Duke Energy's web site, the station has generated more than 500 million megawatt-hours of electricity, and is "the first nuclear station in the United States to achieve this milestone."

Constructing the dam on the Keowee River and creating Lake Keowee resulted in the submerging of historic sites: one was Keowee, an important Cherokee town that was destroyed by British forces in the late 18th century. Before this took place, the sites were excavated in archeological work conducted by the University of South Carolina. Thousands of artifacts, and evidence of human and animal remains were found at Keowee. In addition, the site of former Fort Prince George (South Carolina) was also excavated and artifacts recovered.

In the summer of 2011 Oconee became the first nuclear power station in the United States to have its sensors controlled digitally. In 2021, Duke applied for a permit to keep Oconee operating into the 2050s. The Nuclear Regulatory Commission approved the subsequent license extensions on March 31, 2025, extending the licenses to February 6, 2053 for Unit 1, October 6, 2053 for Unit 2, and July 19, 2054 for Unit 3.

Oconee is unique as it is the only nuclear power plant in the United States that does not rely on emergency diesel generator sets for emergency power. Instead it relies on two hydroelectric units at the nearby Keowee hydroelectric station. In the event the Keowee units are both out of service, emergency power can alternatively be provided by combustion turbines at the nearby Lee fossil generating station. Both sources use alternative cables to supply Oconee's emergency systems; these are independent of the Oconee switchyard and transmission lines, which are the normal source of power.

== Electricity production ==
Generation (MWh) of Oconee Nuclear Station
Year	Jan	Feb	Mar	Apr	May	Jun	Jul	Aug	Sep	Oct	Nov	Dec	Annual (Total)
2001	1,556,540	1,490,217	1,276,816	1,260,364	1,213,766	1,848,753	1,903,180	1,884,904	1,654,576	1,892,721	1,421,536	1,637,123	19,040,496
2002	1,933,474	1,745,334	1,748,028	1,248,796	1,913,490	1,853,050	1,895,601	1,798,224	1,822,768	1,485,668	1,305,767	1,934,892	20,685,092
2003	1,938,209	1,752,786	1,911,413	1,685,286	1,277,029	1,463,129	1,919,141	1,881,017	1,508,481	1,274,639	1,239,677	1,277,924	19,128,731
2004	1,720,979	1,756,460	1,632,799	1,220,727	1,282,041	1,489,055	1,916,822	1,903,919	1,788,626	1,436,128	1,241,711	1,278,228	18,667,495
2005	1,854,349	1,622,070	1,946,912	1,416,712	1,617,217	1,861,880	1,923,805	1,902,140	1,692,450	1,621,580	1,225,111	1,937,350	20,621,576
2006	1,947,293	1,759,202	1,946,970	1,703,485	1,284,522	1,601,171	1,922,693	1,814,012	1,715,414	1,392,268	1,254,270	1,577,798	19,919,098
2007	1,948,567	1,488,186	1,946,579	1,801,382	1,297,383	1,872,446	1,927,139	1,897,361	1,828,278	1,785,710	1,245,522	1,526,097	20,564,650
2008	1,946,910	1,819,903	1,763,726	1,379,319	1,288,116	1,829,340	1,911,897	1,893,710	1,739,243	1,769,327	1,179,511	1,660,099	20,181,101
2009	1,951,664	1,763,540	1,947,134	1,756,601	1,422,159	1,870,414	1,918,090	1,899,160	1,790,760	1,465,624	1,242,585	1,864,506	20,892,237
2010	1,949,036	1,722,094	1,946,932	1,545,344	1,290,943	1,811,748	1,927,083	1,818,373	1,833,564	1,720,581	1,433,009	1,944,318	20,943,025
2011	1,730,749	1,760,466	1,944,307	1,275,473	1,243,745	1,639,951	1,915,551	1,892,670	1,833,517	1,693,926	1,459,597	1,944,013	20,333,965
2012	1,946,180	1,817,640	1,925,119	1,436,272	1,281,521	1,705,979	1,814,181	1,886,454	1,828,446	1,807,132	1,258,356	1,940,200	20,647,480
2013	1,946,274	1,758,089	1,938,172	1,878,420	1,938,775	1,867,781	1,918,216	1,906,324	1,834,691	1,409,718	821,580	1,803,204	21,021,244
2014	1,948,084	1,759,876	1,941,839	1,531,390	1,629,054	1,869,525	1,917,212	1,899,880	1,832,551	1,835,614	1,308,895	1,719,461	21,193,381
2015	1,927,581	1,701,629	1,942,695	1,879,824	1,935,696	1,861,823	1,846,741	1,880,929	1,824,848	1,595,070	1,609,337	1,933,567	21,939,740
2016	1,903,401	1,817,437	1,457,114	1,692,041	1,596,040	1,865,465	1,910,254	1,887,096	1,818,094	1,899,729	1,390,767	1,939,665	21,177,103
2017	1,947,845	1,593,550	1,941,284	1,879,227	1,934,476	1,861,314	1,876,007	1,889,230	1,837,988	1,773,483	1,322,091	1,942,249	21,798,744
2018	1,946,748	1,757,994	1,938,179	1,578,181	1,544,209	1,870,494	1,924,331	1,908,836	1,834,602	1,635,991	1,572,432	1,782,248	21,294,245
2019	1,931,418	1,758,620	1,935,017	1,882,033	1,940,582	1,869,355	1,916,828	1,898,539	1,829,962	1,860,112	1,375,136	1,687,079	21,884,681
2020	1,947,639	1,824,721	1,943,108	1,447,355	1,742,141	1,880,869	1,929,218	1,911,407	1,847,195	1,610,335	1,503,768	1,954,511	21,542,267
2021	1,958,328	1,770,472	1,956,915	1,894,675	1,953,819	1,883,389	1,928,856	1,899,126	1,848,599	1,916,639	1,477,712	1,717,933	22,206,463
2022	1,953,222	1,278,362	1,944,969	1,824,677	1,405,092	1,878,834	1,923,538	1,904,448	1,843,856	1,852,970	1,361,850	1,953,311	21,125,129
2023	1,959,447	1,770,269	1,956,186	1,891,952	1,950,395	1,823,014	1,931,262	1,912,096	1,842,740	1,826,865	1,429,292	1,953,217	22,246,735
2024	1,960,863	1,832,817	1,956,795	1,887,008	1,434,665	1,528,593	1,936,736	1,922,292	1,871,789	1,741,421	1,640,024	1,985,339	21,698,342
2025	1,908,846	1,797,400	1,988,956	1,925,085	1,982,943	1,907,934	1,947,062	1,937,742	1,874,666	1,809,376	1,358,386	1,981,825	22,420,221
2026	1,985,606	1,793,848	1,984,278	1,920,711	1,459,791	1,898,147	1,942,636	1,926,294					--

== Surrounding population ==
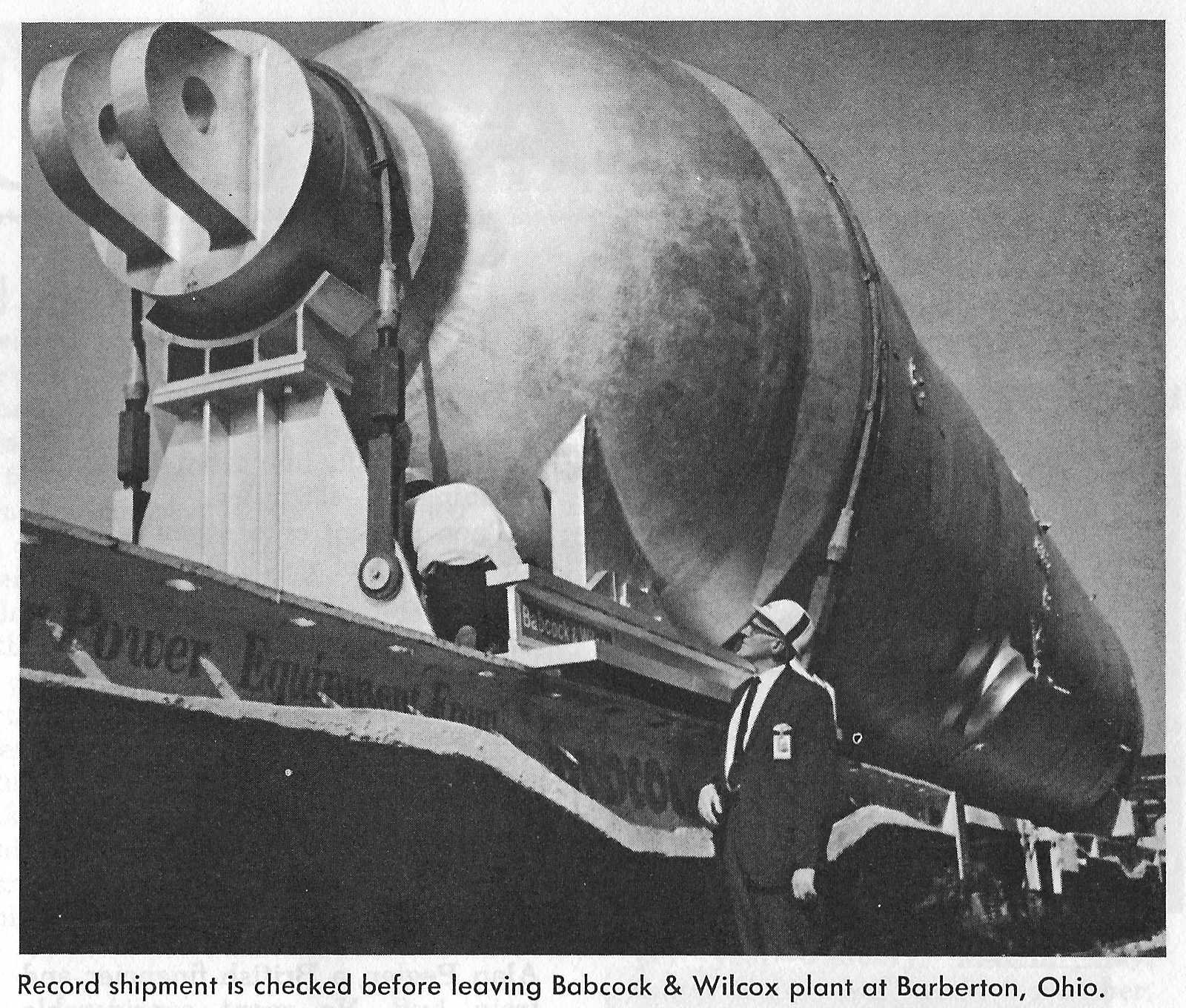
The Babcock & Wilcox nuclear steam generator is seen at the company's plant at Barberton, Ohio prior to shipment via the Penn Central Railroad and the Southern to the Oconee Nuclear Station, then under construction in 1970. This generator can convert more than 10 million pounds of water per hour into steam.

The NRC defines two emergency planning zones around nuclear power plants: a plume exposure pathway zone with a radius of 10 miles (16 km), concerned primarily with exposure to, and inhalation of, airborne radioactive contamination, and an ingestion pathway zone of about 50 miles (80 km), concerned primarily with ingestion of food and liquid contaminated by radioactivity.

The 2010 U.S. population within 10 miles (16 km) of Oconee was 66,307, an increase of 11.5 percent in a decade, according to an analysis of U.S. Census data for msnbc.com. This includes the main campus of Clemson University. The 2010 U.S. population within 50 miles (80 km) was 1,404,690, an increase of 14.8 percent since 2000. Cities within 50 miles include Greenville (30 miles to city center).

== Seismic risk ==
The NRC's estimate of the risk of an earthquake intense enough to cause core damage to the reactor at Oconee was once every 23,256 years, according to an NRC study published in August 2010.

== Flood risk ==
Duke Energy estimated the probability of a random failure of Jocassee Dam at once every 130,000 years, when floodwaters might cause the loss of power and safety equipment at Oconee. Though the company believed "in worst possible conditions" flooding could lead to a significant release of radioactivity, it concluded "the contribution to core damage frequency from precipitation-induced external flooding is considered negligible." Duke informed the NRC about this flooding hazard as early as January 1996. NRC has estimated the probability of a random failure of Jocassee Dam at once every 28,000 years.

Subsequent to Fukushima, improvements were made to the Oconee site to prevent reactor core damage from flooding from a failure of Jocassee Dam. The NRC has expressed satisfaction as of June 2016 with the flood protection modifications, which included new or enhanced flood walls and moving some power lines and equipment to less flood-prone locations.

== See also ==
- List of largest power stations in the United States
- Largest nuclear power plants in the United States
