= Keowee =

Historic Cherokee town

- ᎫᏬᎯᏱ (Cherokee)
- 38Oc1
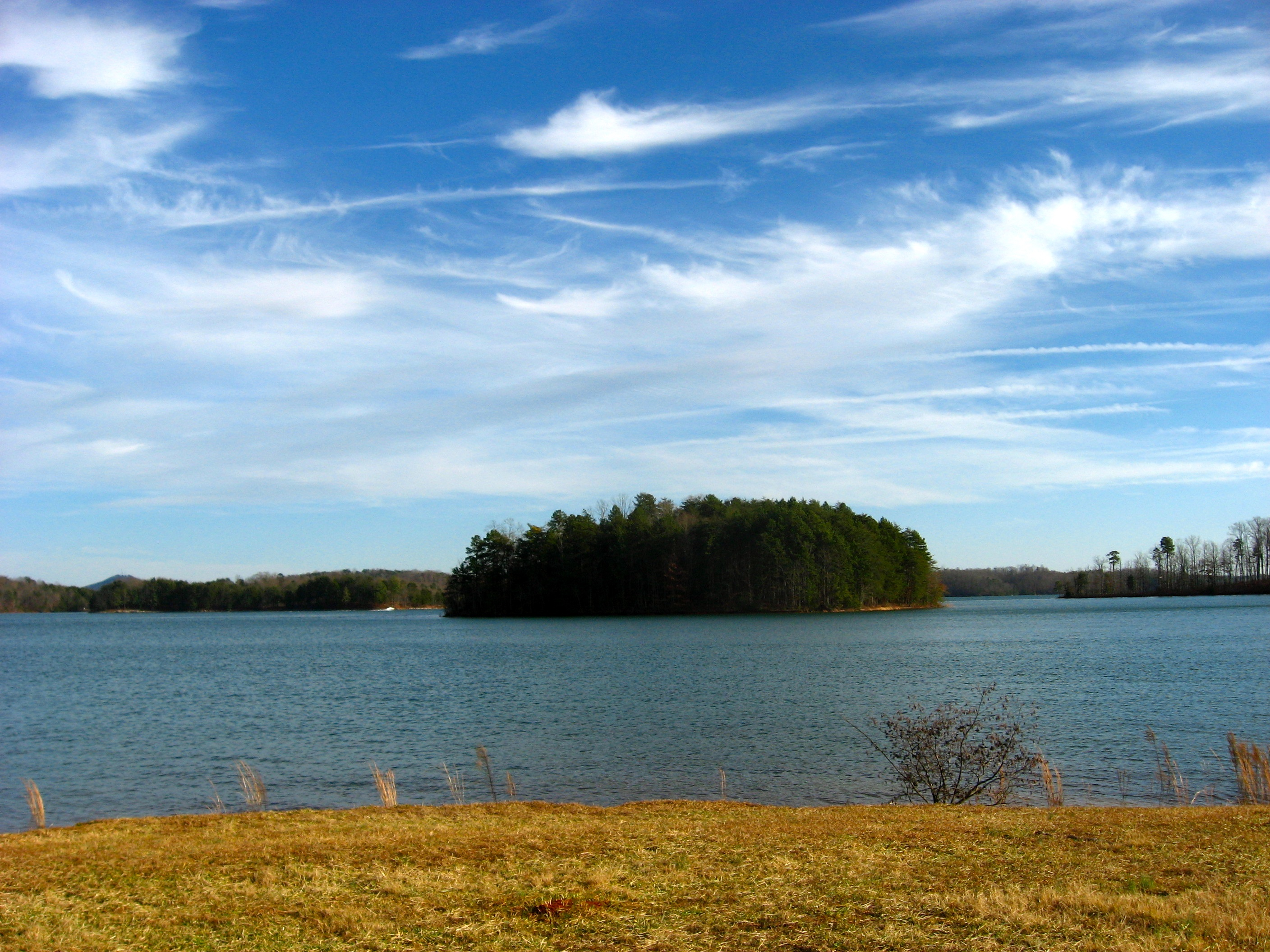
- View of Lake Keowee from north of Betty Branch

- Location within the United States
- 34°51′17″N 82°54′55″W
- Type: Settlement
- Location: Clemson, South Carolina, United States of America

Site notes
- Condition: Submerged

Keowee (Cherokee: ᎫᏬᎯᏱ, romanized: Kuwohiyi, lit. 'Place of the Mulberry Patch') was a Cherokee town in the far northwest corner of present-day South Carolina. It was the principal town of what were called the seven Lower Towns, located along the Keowee River (Colonists referred to the lower reaches of the river as the Savannah, with its mouth at the city they named Savannah). Keowee was situated on the Lower Cherokee Traders' Path, part of the Upper Road through the Piedmont. In 1752 the Cherokee established New Keowee Town nearby, off the traders' path but in a more defensible location.

Both historic sites are within present-day Oconee County, South Carolina at the foot of the Blue Ridge Mountains. European Americans developed the town of Clemson, South Carolina, south of here after they began to populate the area.

When the Keowee River was dammed in a mid-20th century hydropower project, both former Keowee sites were submerged in the early 1970s beneath the waters of Lake Keowee. Before that, archeological excavation was conducted by specialists from the University of South Carolina to establish history and recover thousands of artifacts. Human and animal remains were also discovered at the site.

== Early history ==
In the first half of the 18th century, approximately 2100 Cherokee inhabited sixteen towns east of the Blue Ridge Mountains. The Cherokee people were geographically divided into three regions: the Lower Towns of the Piedmont, the Middle Towns of more mountainous areas and river valleys in Western North Carolina, which included Valley and Outer Towns; and the Overhill Towns on the far western side of the Appalachian Mountains.

The Cherokee were highly decentralized, and their towns were the most important units of government. There were seven Cherokee towns in the Lower Towns, of which Keowee was a principal one. The leaders or chiefs of each exercised substantial authority. Keowee Town is translated as "place of mulberries." It was also known as "Old Keowee," to distinguish it from other, later towns of the same name. The first was established near here in a more defensible position. After the Cherokee moved south and west later in the eighteenth century, deeper into Georgia and Alabama, they named other towns Keowee.

== Role during French and Indian War ==
During the French and Indian War (1754–1763) (the North American front of the Seven Years' War in Europe between Britain and France), the Cherokee allied with the British and played a significant role. The alliance was partly the result of diplomacy by Sir Alexander Cuming, who had earlier visited Keowee (the Old Towne) on March 23, 1730, and solicited the Cherokee as allies.

Fearing an attack by the Muscogee (Creek), their traditional enemies, the Cherokee established a new town of Keowee in 1752, further removed from the Indian Path but more defensible. Most of its inhabitants re-settled there.

As tensions rose with France in the mid to late 1750s, the English built a fort east of the old Keowee town on the Savannah River. South Carolina Governor Glen had ordered this structure and named it Fort Prince George.

During the French and Indian War, trader Nathaniel Gist urged one hundred Cherokee warriors to attack the Shawnee tribe, allies of the French in the Ohio River region. The alliance between the Cherokee and British collapsed due to mutual suspicion.

During the Anglo-Cherokee War (1758–1761), the British razed Keowee Old Towne, and launched a successful attack on Keowee New Towne, sparing the women and children. Keowee New Towne was razed during the first British campaign under the command of Archibald Montgomery. A second army under James Grant campaigned through the remaining Lower Towns and into the Middle Towns in 1760, destroying the Cherokee mother town of Kituwa.

== Late 18th century to present ==
When American naturalist William Bartram visited the Keeowee New Towne site in South Carolina in May 1776, he noted no Cherokee lived there. Anglo colonists had razed the town in 1760 during the Anglo-Cherokee War.

In the late 20th century, the former sites of Old Keowee and New Keowee towns, including the burial ground, was planned for submersion by creation of Lake Keowee in the early 1970s in connection with a Duke Energy project. The Keowee and Little rivers were to be dammed to provide hydropower and cooling water for the Oconee Nuclear Station. These were part of a multi-million-dollar project to provide energy for upstate South Carolina. Oconee was the first of three nuclear power plants built by Duke Power.

Prior to creation of the lake, the sites of both the former towns of Keowee and of Fort Prince George were surveyed and archeological excavations conducted by the University of South Carolina. Thousands of artifacts, plus human and animal remains, were found at Old Keowee. More limited evidence was found at the former fort site, which had been occupied for a brief period.
