= Corinth, South Carolina =

- Unincorporated community
- Location within South Carolina Location within the United States
- Coordinates: 34°42′44″N 82°53′46″W
- Country: United States
- State: South Carolina
- County: Oconee
- Elevation: 889 ft (271 m)
- Time zone: UTC-5 (Eastern (EST))
  - Summer (DST): UTC-4 (EDT)
- Area codes: 864, 821
- GNIS feature ID: 1231196

Corinth is an unincorporated community in Oconee County, South Carolina, United States, located 3.7 miles (6.0 km) east-northeast of Seneca.
