= Little River (Oconee County, South Carolina) =

Location
- Country: United States
- State: South Carolina
- Region: Oconee County

Physical characteristics
- Source: Salem, South Carolina
  - coordinates: 34°54′58″N 83°0′9″W
- Mouth: Seneca, South Carolina
  - coordinates: 34°44′08″N 82°53′29″W

The Little River originally flowed 27.0 miles (43.5 km) from its headwaters in northern Oconee County, South Carolina near Salem into the Keowee River northeast of Seneca.

The Little River was dammed at Newry, South Carolina in the 1890s to power the Newry Mill of the Courtenay Manufacturing Company.

In the early 1960s, the lower part of the Little River was flooded by the Lake Hartwell reservoir. In the early 1970s, the Little River Dam was built upstream of Newry as one of two dams to form Lake Keowee. The upstream portion of the Little River remains free flowing.

The Little River was in the heart of the Cherokee Lower Towns region. Several Cherokee towns were located along the river.
