= Seneca River (South Carolina) =

River in the United States of America

Seneca River Keowee River (portions)
- Native name: I'su'nigû (Cherokee)

Location
- Country: United States
- State: South Carolina
- Region: Oconee County, Pickens County, Anderson County

Physical characteristics
- Source
  - location: Clemson
  - coordinates: 34°41′44″N 82°50′58″W
- Mouth
  - coordinates: 34°26′37″N 82°51′22″W

The Seneca River is created by the confluence of the Keowee River and Twelvemile Creek in northwestern South Carolina, downriver from Lake Keowee near Clemson. It is now entirely inundated by Lake Hartwell, and forms a 21-mile-long (34 km) arm of the lake. The Seneca River and the Tugaloo River join to form the Savannah River.

The boundary between the Seneca River and the Keowee River has changed over time. In the Revolutionary War period, the upper part of the Seneca River was often called the Keowee River.

In current times, the section of the Keowee River between the Keowee Dam and its confluence with Twelvemile Creek is called the Seneca River on many maps, including the official county highway map. Since this area was flooded by Lake Hartwell, created by damming the Seneca and Tugaloo rivers, this section is often referred to as the Seneca.
