= South Union, South Carolina =

Census-designated place in South Carolina, United States

- Census-designated place
- Location within South Carolina Location within the United States
- Coordinates: 34°33′13″N 83°03′03″W
- Country: United States
- State: South Carolina
- County: Oconee

Area
  - Total: 2.62 sq mi (6.79 km^{2})
  - Land: 2.60 sq mi (6.74 km^{2})
  - Water: 0.015 sq mi (0.04 km^{2})
- Elevation: 906 ft (276 m)

Population (2020)
  - Total: 341
  - Density: 131.0/sq mi (50.57/km^{2})
- Time zone: UTC-5 (Eastern (EST))
  - Summer (DST): UTC-4 (EDT)
- ZIP Codes: 29693 (Westminster); 29643 (Fair Play)
- Area codes: 864, 821
- FIPS code: 45-68210
- GNIS feature ID: 2812980

South Union is an unincorporated community and census-designated place (CDP) in Oconee County, South Carolina, United States. It was first listed as a CDP prior to the 2020 census with a population of 341.

The CDP is in southern Oconee County, bordered to the southwest by the Chickasaw Point CDP. South Carolina Highway 11, the Cherokee Foothills Scenic Highway, runs through South Union, leading south 5 miles (8 km) to South Carolina Exit 1 on Interstate 85. To the north the highway provides access to Westminster, 9 miles (14 km) to the northwest, and Seneca, 14 miles (23 km) to the northeast. South Carolina Highway 182 runs through the east side of South Union, leading southeast 5 miles (8 km) to Fair Play and northeast 4 miles (6 km) to South Carolina Highway 24 at Oakway.

== Demographics ==
Historical population
Census	Pop.	Note	%±
2020	341		—
U.S. Decennial Census; 2020

South Union first appeared as a census designated place in the 2020 U.S. census.

=== 2020 census ===
South Union CDP, South Carolina – Demographic Profile (NH = Non-Hispanic)
Race / Ethnicity	Pop 2020	% 2020
White alone (NH)	317	92.96%
Black or African American alone (NH)	3	0.88%
Native American or Alaska Native alone (NH)	0	0.00%
Asian alone (NH)	0	0.00%
Pacific Islander alone (NH)	0	0.00%
Some Other Race alone (NH)	4	1.17%
Mixed Race/Multi-Racial (NH)	8	2.35%
Hispanic or Latino (any race)	9	2.64%
Total	341	100.00%

Note: the US Census treats Hispanic/Latino as an ethnic category. This table excludes Latinos from the racial categories and assigns them to a separate category. Hispanics/Latinos can be of any race.
