= Lake Keowee =

Man-made lake in South Carolina, United States

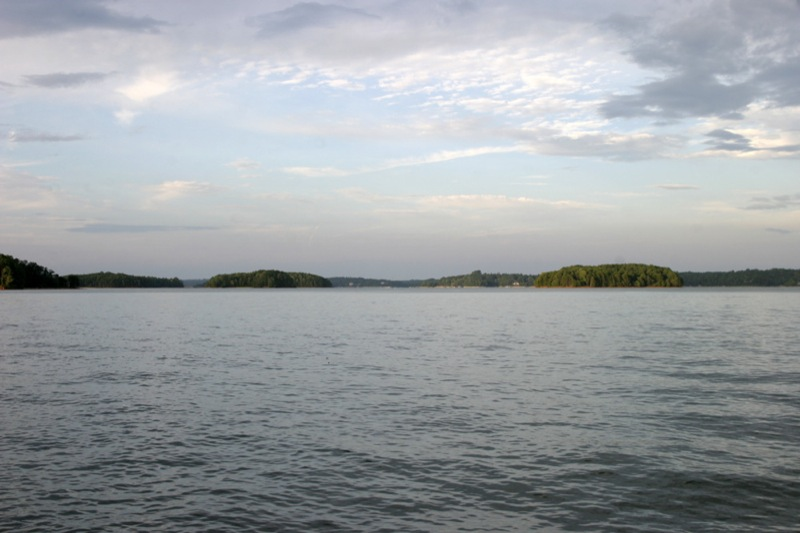

- Location within South Carolina
- Location: Oconee / Pickens counties, South Carolina, United States
- Coordinates: 34°48′00″N 82°53′12″W
- Type: Reservoir
- Primary inflows: Keowee River; Little River; Whitewater; Thompson; Toxaway; Lake Jocassee
- Primary outflows: Keowee River; Seneca River; Savannah River
- Basin countries: United States
- Max. length: 26 miles (42 km)
- Max. width: 3 miles (4.8 km)
- Surface area: 18,500 acres (75 km^{2})
- Average depth: 53 feet (16 m)
- Max. depth: 150 ft (46 m)
- Shore length^{1}: 387 miles (623 km)
- Surface elevation: 800 feet (240 m)
- Settlements: Arial, Clemson, Dacusville, Easley, Liberty, Pickens, Salem, Seneca, Walhalla, and Westminster
- ^{1} Shore length is not a well-defined measure.

Lake Keowee is a man-made reservoir in the United States in the state of South Carolina. It was developed to serve the needs of power utility Duke Energy and public recreational purposes. It is approximately 26 miles (42 km) long, 3 miles (4.8 km) wide, with an average depth of 54 feet (16 m), and a shoreline measured at 300 miles (480 km) in total, and is approximately 800 feet (240 m) above sea level.

The massive demolition and building project began in 1971 with the construction of two large dams––Keowee Dam and Little River Dam, built on the rivers of the same names. The project covered 18,372 acres (74.35 km^{2}). The lake collects or impounds waters from the Keowee River and the Little River and others. The outflows below the respective dams join to form the Seneca River, which flows into the larger Savannah River.

Lake water is used to cool Duke Energy's three nuclear reactors located at the Oconee Nuclear Generating Station. In addition, the dams help generate hydroelectric power. The Keowee Hydro Station generates 158 megawatts from the lake's outflows. Lake Keowee has provided a recreational destination for fishing, boating, swimming, sailing, kayaking and other watersports. The lake has been described as having pure and clean water.

The name Keowee (ᎨᎣᏫ) is a Cherokee word: it is roughly translated as "place of the mullberries." The historic town of Keowee had been located on the bank of the Keowee River and was the largest of the seven Cherokee Lower Towns in the colonial period, in what became the state of South Carolina. Both the town and the former Keowee River were inundated by the formation of Lake Keowee. Archeological excavations conducted in advance of the project by the University of South Carolina recovered thousands of artifacts, as well as evidence of human and animal remains. There was a traditional burial ground at the town.

== History ==
Creek Confederacy tribes and to a lesser degree, the Cherokees, (and their ancestors) have long lived in this area.

In 1753, Anglo-European settlers built Fort Prince George across the river from Keowee. Keowee was destroyed and largely razed by British forces in retaliation for Cherokee killings during tensions in 1760. By the American Revolutionary War, the Cherokee mostly allied with the British Crown, in the hopes of expelling the American frontier people from their lands. Some had moved out of the Lower Towns to areas more removed from Anglo-American colonists. They were largely left on their own during the Revolution but defeated after the British loss at Sullivan's Island in 1776.

The Cherokee in the Carolina highlands and northeastern Georgia were decimated by a large force of the Continental Army and South Carolina militia under the command of Colonel Andrew Williamson; they petitioned for peace. The Treaty of Dewitt's Corner, signed May 20, 1777, stipulated a new border between the Cherokee and European Americans, defining it as the crest of the Oconee Mountains. The Cherokee ceded almost all their lands in modern Oconee, Pickens, Anderson, and Greenville counties of South Carolina.

The Hopewell Treaty of 1785 and others reaffirmed those boundaries, while clarifying access for the bordering Cherokee to continue to use the hunting grounds along the mountainous slopes of the border that technically fell into the land of the white settlers. In the treaty of Washington of 1816, the Cherokee sold this remaining strip of land and its hunting grounds to the United States for $5,000; they relocated to points further west and south in Georgia.

The land that eventually became the extreme northern border of modern Lake Keowee was never again contested. But, the Indian Removal Act of 1830 forced most of the Cherokee to depart the Southeast, including from Georgia and Alabama. Historians have estimated that up to 4,000 of 16,000 Cherokee died from disease, exposure, and starvation on what became known as the Trail of Tears to new lands west of the Mississippi River in Indian Territory (now Oklahoma).

=== Late 20th century to present ===
Beginning around 1963 and continuing in subsequent years, a company called the South Carolina Land & Timber firm began purchasing land along the Keowee River for the specific purpose of "acquiring, holding, and developing land and timber properties". What was then known as Duke Power Company bought 83,400 acres from the Singer Corporation and private landowners. In the mid-1960s, Duke Power executives consulted with state and federal authorities, and searched for a way to supply the growing southeastern region with greater electricity.

They explored various ways to purchase inexpensive land, create artificial lakes, and use the power from stored energy to both cool the reactors from nuclear power plants as well as generate power from cascading waters by hydroelectric methods. The project was modeled in part on successes of projects of the Tennessee Valley Authority. On January 2, 1965, Duke Energy president W. B. McGuire held a press conference at Clemson University and announced plans to build a large complex to generate power, called the Keowee-Toxaway project, which would cost an estimated $700 million. Two days later, Duke filed for license to build the first phase of construction.

Since the project would require flooding of a large area, including known sites of historic and archeological importance, Duke Energy hired archaeologists from the University of South Carolina to excavate many of the sites in the area, including that of the colonial fort. One participant in the dig built a model of an excavation site, which can be viewed at the Keowee-Toxaway State Park. The Cherokee site of the former Keowee Town was also excavated. Thousands of artifacts were discovered, including pottery, beads, and remains from humans and animals.

The massive demolition and building project of the dams began. Huge swaths of forest land were cleared by removing and selling lumber from the downed trees. Selected wooded areas were set afire to enable bulldozing operations. Some areas were dug deeper to increase the future depth of the lake and give it sufficient volume for its cooling purposes. Duke hired the Jeff Hunt Machinery Company to clear the basins for the Lake Keowee and Lake Jocassee sites; at the time, it was one of the largest orders for land clearing ever to have been given in the states of North Carolina and South Carolina. Later it hired the firms of Blythe Brothers and Clement Brothers to begin earth-moving operations commencing in 1967.

In the first phase, dams were built on the Keowee and Little rivers to create Lake Keowee. A dam blocking the Jocassee River created Lake Jocassee. One estimate of the expense for this phase of the project was $83 million. At the official groundbreaking ceremony in April 1967, a red, white and blue dynamite charge was set off by South Carolina governor Robert McNair.

Of the three dams built, the dam on the Keeowee River was the longest at 3,500 feet (1,100 m) in length, 800 feet (240 m) wide at its base, and 20 feet (6.1 m) wide at the top. It is 20 feet (6.1 m) higher than the Little River dam, but it is 215 feet (66 m) lower than the Jocassee dam. Both lakes were fed by the Whitewater, Thompson, and Toxaway rivers. In addition, the Lake Jocassee hydro station feeds water into Lake Keowee. The initial transfer of water began in December 1973, and commercial operation began on December 19, 1973.

== Power generation ==
The Keowee dam has two hydroelectric generating units, capable of generating 40 megawatts which is sufficient energy to power approximately 7,000 homes. In addition, a tunnel was built for the purpose of transporting water. The Keowee water transportation tunnel is 800 feet (240 m) long and 33.5 feet (10.2 m) feet wide and contains a maximum of 5,300,000 US gallons (20,000,000 litres), with an average flow rate of 1,000 cubic feet (28 cubic metres) per second.

To cool the nuclear reactors, a structure called the Oconee skimmer wall was built; it separates the plant's inlet canal from the lake itself. The effect of the skimmer is to fetch cool lake water from a depth of 150 feet, which serves as a middle point in the lake's depth. This is sufficiently deep to extract water during a drought or prolonged dry spell in which lake levels drop, and it is not so deep that inlet valves may become blocked with mud or other particulate matter. Duke Energy closed the gates of the Keowee dam on April 2, 1970, to begin the final phase of collecting the water, or what engineers refer to as impounding the lake. It reached an ultimate lake depth of 150 feet (46 m). The Keowee hydro station began commercial operation on April 17, 1971.

The Oconee Nuclear Site was completed and began operation in 1973. As of, it has generated more electricity than any other site in the nation.

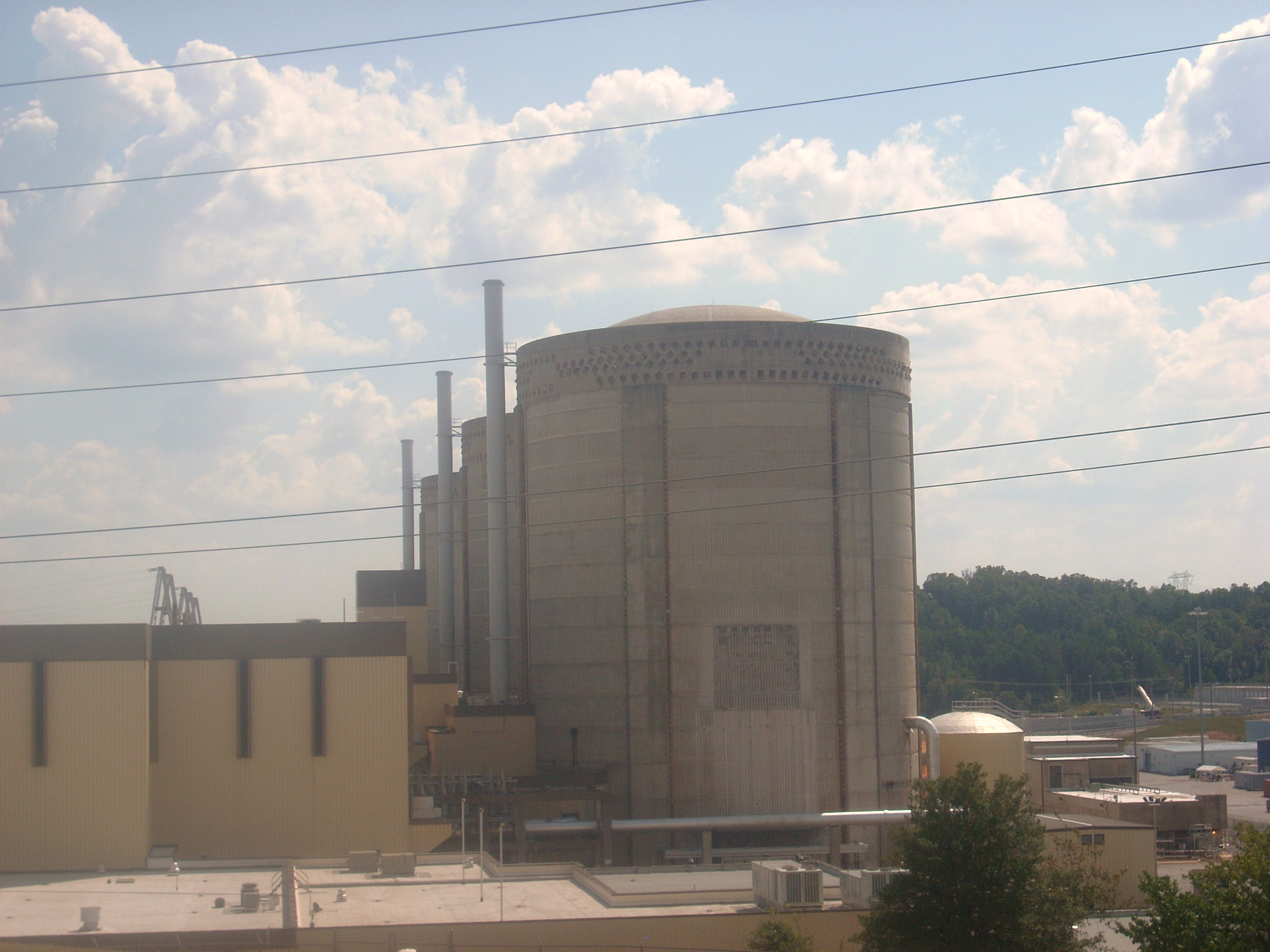
Oconee Nuclear Station, Seneca (Oconee County, South Carolina)

Duke Energy's Oconee Nuclear Station is about 8 miles (13 km) from both the towns of Salem to the north and Seneca to the south. Since it began operation, the station has generated more than 500 million megawatt-hours worth of electricity, the first nuclear station in the country to achieve this. According to one estimate, it has a generating capacity of 2.6 million kilowatts of power, which is enough to power 1.9 million homes.

In 1996 concerns were raised that Duke and numerous other nuclear utilities around the nation had been using improper methods during the refueling process. Investigation by the Nuclear Regulatory Commission (NRC) resulted in corrections being made to the problems; these changes resulted in increased cooling capacity. In 2011, the United States Nuclear Regulatory Commission renewed the site's license for an additional 20 years of service.

== Politics ==
Since Duke Energy built the lake and uses it regularly for power generation and cooling, it has considerable authority over its operation. It manages not just the dams and lake, but the shoreline around the lake, including docks and walls. It is responsible for the land around the lake up to a specific elevation.

The Federal Energy Regulatory Commission oversees Duke Energy's management, for instance ensuring whether the lake is accessible by the public. This was one of the conditions of the original approvals of the projects. Duke Energy is Oconee county's largest taxpayer. Builders and developers and others often must have written permission from the energy utility before embarking on any significant changes around the lake.

Duke Energy cooperates with state and federal authorities to manage the area; for example, in the summer of 2011, energy officials conferred with the United States Army Corps of Engineers regarding matters such as lake levels and making changes to nuclear station pumps for added flexibility. In addition, the utility has sponsored clean-up drives to keep the lake free of litter and pollution. It also has commissioned studies to monitor "recreation pressures on the lake".

Residents who have bought homes along the lake or nearby formed an advocacy group named the Friends Of Lake Keowee Society or abbreviated as FOLKS. It was established in 1993 to represent the interests of lake residents in terms of environmental and recreational issues. The Society has initiated monitoring the lake's water quality and watershed. An "Island Keeper Program" is an effort to reduce litter. The advocacy group has brought pressure to block proposed developments; for example, developers seeking to build a multi-use facility in 2011, to include a restaurant, store, lodge and fueling station, had to face FOLKS members in a public hearing to hear community input. FOLKS is concerned that the lake area is becoming over–developed, with too many houses or developments, which may interfere with the overall beauty of the lake. There have been concerns about overcrowding, light pollution, noise pollution, and stormwater runoff. Large-scale developments tend to cause greater concern. One estimate by the advocacy group was that there were at least 80 land parcels on or around the lake which had at least 10 acres each.

County authorities have exerted influence on what happens in and around the lake. In one instance, authorities raised concerns about a planned 12–story highrise condominiums around the lake on the basis that it might change the lake's "skyline".

== Geography and climate ==
The Lake is predominately located in the South Carolina county of Oconee, in the northwestern section of the triangularly-shaped state near the Blue Ridge Mountains range. Parts of the lake extend into Pickens County, which is directly east and adjacent to Oconee county.

The lake is within a few hundred miles of the following southeastern cities: Charleston 250 miles (400 km); Columbia 136 miles (219 km); Greenville 35 miles (56 km); Charlotte, 127 miles (204 km); Raleigh-Durham 269 miles (433 km); Atlanta 145 miles (233 km); Augusta 135 miles (217 km); Savannah 247 miles (398 km). Winters are generally mild with temperate summers.

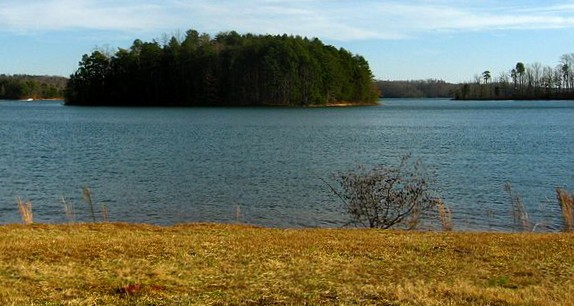
An island on the lake

== Recreation ==
- Public parks. At the lake's north end, the Keowee-Toxaway State Park was built. There are other parks along and around the lake as well.
- Campgrounds. The 1,000 acres (4.0 km^{2}) Keowee-Toxaway State Park was created by a partnership between Duke Energy and the state of South Carolina. It consists of three different parks: 155 acres (0.63 km^{2}) Mile Creek Park, 40 acres (0.16 km^{2}) South Cove Park, and the 44 acres (0.18 km^{2}) High Falls Park. An additional 373 acres (1.51 km^{2}) known as Eastotoe Park is managed by the South Carolina department of Natural Resources as a natural wildlife preserve. Duke Energy also has created six additional boat access slips. Selected islands in the lake are accessible during daytime hours, although Duke Energy generally prohibits overnight camping, fires, littering, and making any permanent structures on them or removing any vegetation from them.
- Boating. Lake Keowee provides a marina for residents who live around the lake or nearby. There have been boating-related accidents; in one high profile incident, a Clemson football player on a jet ski struck and killed an assistant track coach resulting in much media attention. There have been other instances of collisions between boats. To provide outdoor facilities for boaters, county administrators built a floating bathroom at the expense of $135,000 as part of an effort to "preserve the shoreline and protect water quality, citing complaints about diapers, toilet paper and other items found around the lake."
- Water sports. The lake is a venue for a variety of water sports such as waterskiing.
- Fishing. The lake has three types of bass–– largemouth, smallmouth and spotted–– as well as crappie, bluegill, yellow perch, catfish, brown trout and rainbow trout.
- Swimming. The lake is suitable for swimming. There have been instances of drownings, sometimes because a non-swimmer was knocked into a deeper section of the lake or fell into a section where a hidden underwater current overpowered a swimmer.

== Physical features ==
- Area. Lake Keowee's waters cover approximately 18,500 acres (75 km^{2}) and there are 300 miles of shoreline. The full water elevation of Lake Keowee is around 800 feet. It is 23 miles long and 3 miles wide at the widest point. The average depth is 54 feet.
- Drinking water. The lake provides drinking water to Greenville and Seneca and surrounding areas.
- Cleanliness. The lake has a reputation for having excellent water quality. One of the 110 communities on the lake, Keowee Key, discharges treated wastewater directly into the lake in accordance with strict standards monitored by the South Carolina Department of Health and Environmental Control. The remaining communities have other methods to dispose of wastewater, such as pumping wastewater to a special site where it is "drip-dispersed" or using buffers or specialized filtration systems.

== Commercial activity ==
=== Real estate ===
The area has attracted real estate developers who have built a wide range of facilities for differing purposes. One private developer in conjunction with authorities from Pickens County is building a multi-use "recreation complex" which features cabins, boats, restaurants, parking for RVs, campsites, fishing piers, a beach for swimming, boat docks and storage. There has been phenomenal growth since the 1970s; one estimate was that there have been 110 separate communities which have "popped up" along the lake's 300 miles of shoreline since the lake's formation, with 10,000 "buildable lots" which have 2,000 houses, many of them "multistory mansions," according to one description. One multi-use facility features a large park for dogs, pet-friendly trails, and open space including shoreline. There are reports that the area is becoming increasingly attractive for retirees as well as persons seeking a weekend retreat. A developer of a gated community brought in almost 5,000 large one-ton boulders to stabilize muddy banks along a creek feeding into the lake. In a section near the lake, developers built a mountain-top golf course as an amenity. Fire stations in the vicinity include the Keowee Fire Department which is assisted by neighboring companies when necessary. The approval process for developers seeking to build on large lots is "comprehensive", according to one report, with permissions needed from not only the Duke officials, but from community residents, the Federal Energy Regulatory Commission and 14 state and resource agencies as well as the Eastern Band of Cherokee Indians.

=== Vacation homes ===
Homes in the lake area have been constructed and bought by persons seeking retirement as well as persons who love lake-related outdoor activity. Many residents own boats; summer weekends were described in one report as busier than weekdays in terms of boaters using the lake. Two residents reported their experience with a lake house:

Summer weekends on the lake are busy, but during the week you might only see four or five boats go by all day. ... We'll see kayaks and a few sailboats, but mostly it's motorboats on the lake. Our kids water-ski and wakeboard. We also have three dogs, and within the first five minutes of arriving they are in the lake, too. The house, more than anything, has been a gathering place for our family. We do a lot of entertaining there, from hosting Tom's parents' 50th wedding anniversary party to birthday celebrations. Our son is getting married soon, and the reception will be at the house. Even when not entertaining, we are there almost every weekend in the summer. Tom is a golfer, but I can sit out on the deck looking out on the lake all day.

— report in 2007 in The New York Times

Notable residents include INSP network's CEO David Cerullo who built a 9,000 square feet (840 m^{2}) home overlooking the lake. One charity purchased a home for a wounded marine.

== Other ==
Education. There are numerous schools located near the lake, including Clemson University, Tri-County Technical College, and Anderson University.

== See also ==
- Lake Jocassee
- List of lakes in South Carolina
