= Fort Prince George (South Carolina) =

18th century fort in South Carolina

Coordinates: 34°51′29″N 82°53′38″W

Fort Prince George was a fort constructed in 1753 in the Province of South Carolina, on the Cherokee Path across the Keowee River from the Cherokee town of Keowee. The fort was named for the Prince of Wales, who would later become King George III of the United Kingdom. It was the principal Carolinian trading post among the Cherokee "Lower Towns". A notable official who served here was Edward Wilkinson. He served as a Factor and Commissioner to the Cherokee in the mid 1760s.

== History ==
The fort was built on the Keowee River, across from the largest Cherokee "Lower Town", Keowee. The fort was a 200-foot (61 m) square built of earth and wood with walls 12 to 15 feet (4.6 m) high, surrounded by a deep trench. The fort's interior living area was about 100 feet (30 m) square. The interior contained a guardhouse, storehouse, kitchen, magazine, barracks, and officer's quarters.

The fort served as a staging point for three British assaults on the Cherokee during the Anglo-Cherokee War. It also was the site of a siege by Cherokee warriors in February 1760, simultaneously with attacks on Ninety-Six, Fort Dobbs and Fort Loudoun. Hostilities ended in 1761, and the fort was abandoned by 1768.

The site is in modern-day Pickens County, South Carolina. In 1970, both the sites of Keowee and the fort were archaeologically excavated. This was 18 months before these sites were to be submerged by creation of Lake Keowee. It was formed by filling behind the Keowee Dam in 1971.

Some of the items discovered at the fort included:

- three presumed Indian skeletons
- musket and cannonballs,
- rum bottles,
- pieces of cooking utensils, and
- wine glass fragments
