= Oconee County, South Carolina =

County in South Carolina, United States

- County
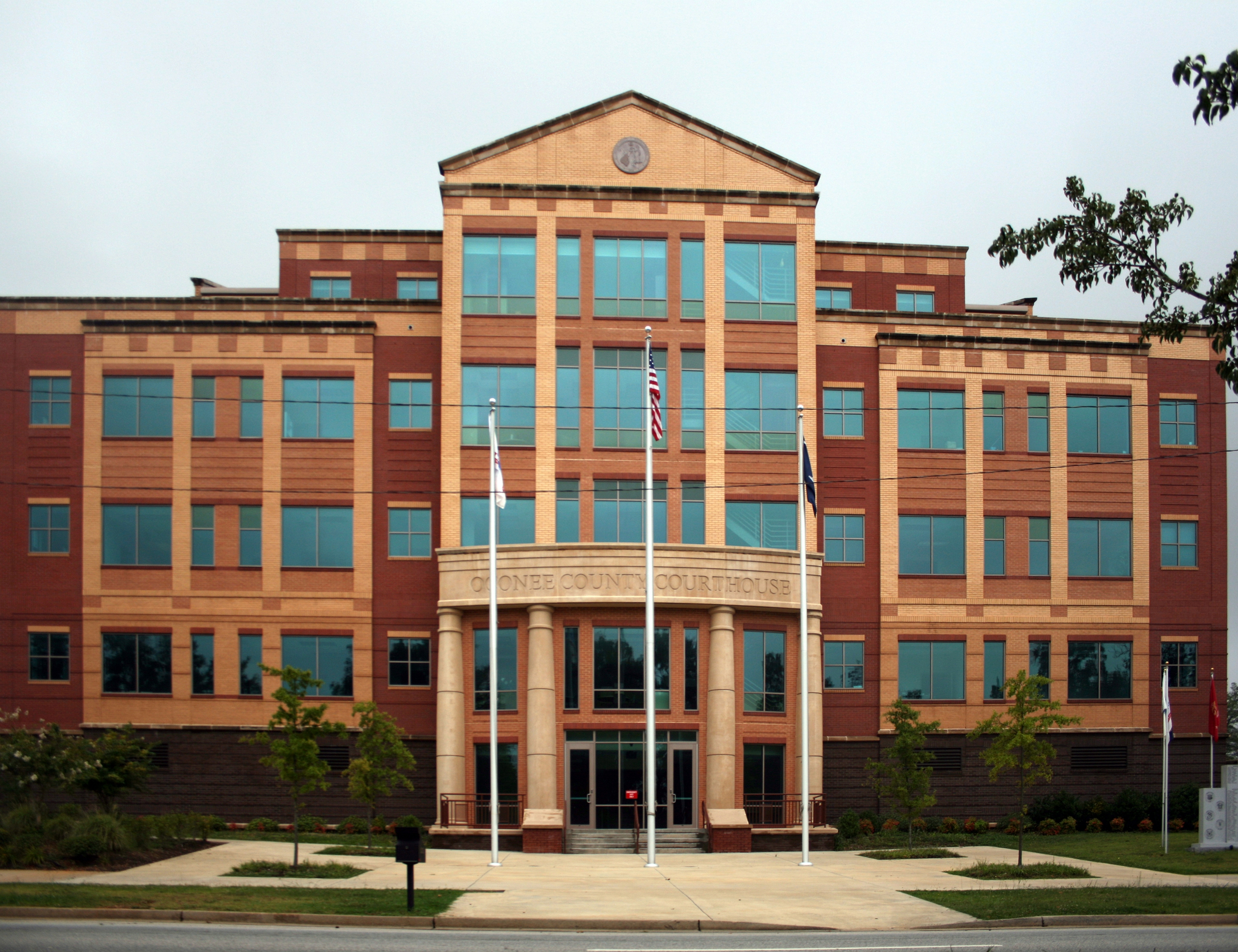
- Oconee County Courthouse in Walhalla

- Flag Seal Logo
- Nickname: Land Beside The Water
- Location within the U.S. state of South Carolina
- Coordinates: 34.75°N 83.06°W
- Country: United States
- State: South Carolina
- Founded: 1868
- Named for: Cherokee word for "land beside the water"
- Seat: Walhalla
- Largest community: Seneca

Area
  - Total: 673.57 sq mi (1,744.5 km^{2})
  - Land: 626.56 sq mi (1,622.8 km^{2})
  - Water: 47.01 sq mi (121.8 km^{2}) 6.98%

Population (2020)
  - Total: 78,607
  - Estimate (2025): 83,775 ▲
  - Density: 125.46/sq mi (48.440/km^{2})
- Time zone: UTC−5 (Eastern)
  - Summer (DST): UTC−4 (EDT)
- Congressional district: 3rd
- Website: www.oconeesc.com

Oconee County is the westernmost county in the U.S. state of South Carolina. As of the 2020 census, the population was 78,607. Its county seat is Walhalla and its largest community is Seneca. Oconee County is included in the Seneca, SC Micropolitan Statistical Area, which is also included in the Greenville-Spartanburg-Anderson, SC Combined Statistical Area. South Carolina Highway 11, the Cherokee Foothills National Scenic Highway, begins in southern Oconee County at Interstate Highway 85 at the Georgia state line.

Oconee County welcome sign

== History ==
Oconee County was named after a historic Cherokee town and the word "Ae-quo-nee", meaning "land beside the water." Oconee (Cherokee: ᎤᏊᏄ, romanized: Uquunu) town developed on the Cherokee trading path near present-day Oconee Station State Historic Site along Oconee Creek. The town was located along the Cherokee trading path of the early 18th century between the English colonial Atlantic port of Charleston and the Mississippi River to the west.

Oconee Town did not develop around an ancient platform mound like those built by ancestral peoples during the period of the Southern Appalachian Mississippian culture, approximately 1000CE to 1500CE. In their public architecture, the historic Cherokee built communal town houses around a central ceremonial pole and council house. The council house was a meeting place for the larger community and council. Through the centuries of their long occupancy, the Cherokee would replace the council house, and maintain and add to nearby mounds, building in distinctly colored layers of earth that are visible to archeologists.

Due to its geographic position, the town was at the intersection of the trading path and the Cherokee treaty boundary of 1777. In 1792, the newly formed South Carolina State Militia built a frontier outpost near the town site, and named it Oconee Station.

European-American settlement in this far western area of the colony did not begin until the late eighteenth century. Most did not take place until decades after the American Revolutionary War. South Carolina jurisdictions were successively called parishes, counties, judicial districts and counties again. Oconee County was not created until 1868, after the American Civil War and during the Reconstruction era. It was taken from part of the Pickens District and named after Oconee Town.

=== Post-Revolutionary and 19th-century history ===
- 1780s - The rare American wildflower, Oconee Bell, was first recorded by French botanist André Michaux.
- 1780s - Colonel Benjamin Cleveland and a group of Revolutionary veterans received land grants from the state of Georgia (which then claimed this area according to their colonial charter), in lieu of payment for service, and settled in present-day Oconee County.
- 1787 - Georgia withdrew its claims to the land between the Tugaloo and Keowee rivers by the Treaty of Beaufort with South Carolina.
- 1816 - Under pressure from encroaching European Americans, the Cherokee sold their remaining South Carolina land.
- 1850s - The largest town in the county was Tunnel Hill, located above Stumphouse Mountain Tunnel.
- 1868 - Oconee County was formed by the state legislature dividing Pickens County. Walhalla was designated as the county seat.
- 1870 - Air Line Railroad built a railroad through the county; it stimulated development at stops known as Seneca and Westminster
- 1893 - Newry was established as a mill village to house workers of the Courtenay Manufacturing Company, a textile mill that produced cotton, wool, and other textile products.

=== Present day ===
Current residents refer to Oconee County as the "Golden Corner" due to its status as South Carolina's most north-western county.

== Geography ==
Interactive map of Oconee County

According to the U.S. Census Bureau, the county has a total area of 673.57 square miles (1,744.5 km^{2}), of which 626.56 square miles (1,622.8 km^{2}) is land and 47.01 square miles (121.8 km^{2}) (6.98%) is water. Three large man-made lakes provide residents with sport fishing, water skiing, and sailing as well as hydroelectric power. The largest lake is Lake Hartwell, built by the U.S. Army Corps of Engineers between 1955 and 1963. Lake Keowee is the second-largest lake and the Oconee Nuclear Station operates by the lake. Lake Jocassee is the third-largest and is a source of hydroelectric energy, but is also popular for its scenery and numerous waterfalls.

Bad Creek Reservoir, located in the mountains above Jocassee, is also used for generating electricity during peak hours. The water level can fall by tens of feet per hour and, during off-peak times, water is pumped back into the lake for the next peak period. Because of the dramatic changes in water level due to these uses, boating and swimming are prohibited in this reservoir.

Oconee County is in the Savannah River basin.

=== National protected areas ===
- Ellicott Rock Wilderness (part)
- Sumter National Forest (part)

=== State and local protected areas/sites ===
- Brasstown Creek Heritage Preserve/Wildlife Management Area
- Buzzard Roost Heritage Preserve/Wildlife Management Area
- Chau Ram County Park
- Devils Fork State Park
- High Falls County Park
- Horsepasture River
- Lake Hartwell State Recreation Area
- Oconee State Park
- Oconee Station State Historic Site
- Piedmont Forestry Center
- Poe Creek State Forest (part)
- South Cove County Park
- Stumphouse Mountain Heritage Preserve/Wildlife Management Area
- Sumter National Forest - Andrew Pickens Ranger District
- W.P. Anderson City Park
- Yellow Branch Falls Recreation Area

=== Major water bodies ===
- Chattooga River
- Keowee River
- Lake Hartwell
- Lake Jocassee
- Lake Keowee
- Little River
- Savannah River

=== Adjacent counties ===
- Jackson County, North Carolina – north
- Transylvania County, North Carolina – northeast
- Pickens County – east
- Anderson County – southeast
- Hart County, Georgia – south
- Franklin County, Georgia – south
- Stephens County, Georgia – southwest
- Habersham County, Georgia – west
- Rabun County, Georgia – west
- Macon County, North Carolina – northwest

=== Major highways ===
- I-85
- US 76
- US 123
- SC 11
- SC 24
- SC 28
- SC 59
- SC 107
- SC 130
- SC 182
- SC 183
- SC 188
- SC 243

=== Major infrastructure ===
- Oconee County Regional Airport

== Demographics ==
Historical population
Census	Pop.	Note	%±
1870	10,536		—
1880	16,256		54.3%
1890	18,687		15.0%
1900	23,634		26.5%
1910	27,337		15.7%
1920	30,117		10.2%
1930	33,368		10.8%
1940	36,512		9.4%
1950	39,050		7.0%
1960	40,204		3.0%
1970	40,728		1.3%
1980	48,611		19.4%
1990	57,494		18.3%
2000	66,215		15.2%
2010	74,273		12.2%
2020	78,607		5.8%
2025 (est.)	83,775	▲	6.6%
U.S. Decennial Census; 1790–1960 1900–1990; 1990–2000 2010 2020

=== 2020 census ===
As of the 2020 census, the county had a population of 78,607. The median age was 47.1 years. 19.1% of residents were under the age of 18 and 24.5% of residents were 65 years of age or older. For every 100 females there were 96.9 males, and for every 100 females age 18 and over there were 95.5 males age 18 and over. There were 21,214 families residing in the county.

There were 33,241 households in the county, of which 24.4% had children under the age of 18 living with them and 25.5% had a female householder with no spouse or partner present. About 27.7% of all households were made up of individuals and 13.0% had someone living alone who was 65 years of age or older.

There were 40,788 housing units, of which 18.5% were vacant. Among occupied housing units, 75.0% were owner-occupied and 25.0% were renter-occupied. The homeowner vacancy rate was 1.8% and the rental vacancy rate was 9.7%.

36.3% of residents lived in urban areas, while 63.7% lived in rural areas.

The most reported ancestries were:

- English (23.9%)
- Irish (13.2%)
- German (11.3%)
- African American (4.6%)
- Mexican (3.8%)
- Scottish (3.3%)
- Italian (2.3%)
- French (1.6%)
- Cherokee (1.3%)
- Polish (1.2%)

=== Racial and ethnic composition ===
As of the 2020 census, the racial makeup of the county was 83.7% White, 6.6% Black or African American, 0.4% American Indian and Alaska Native, 0.8% Asian, 0.0% Native Hawaiian and Pacific Islander, 2.7% from some other race, and 5.9% from two or more races. Hispanic or Latino residents of any race comprised 5.6% of the population.

Oconee County, South Carolina – Racial and ethnic composition Note: the US Census treats Hispanic/Latino as an ethnic category. This table excludes Latinos from the racial categories and assigns them to a separate category. Hispanics/Latinos may be of any race.
Race / Ethnicity (NH = Non-Hispanic)	Pop 1980	Pop 1990	Pop 2000	Pop 2010	Pop 2020	% 1980	% 1990	% 2000	% 2010	% 2020
White alone (NH)	43,419	51,683	58,259	63,807	64,696	89.32%	89.89%	87.98%	85.91%	82.30%
Black or African American alone (NH)	4,754	5,029	5,533	5,550	5,119	9.78%	8.75%	8.36%	7.47%	6.51%
Native American or Alaska Native alone (NH)	43	69	133	152	176	0.09%	0.12%	0.20%	0.20%	0.22%
Asian alone (NH)	38	169	232	421	591	0.08%	0.29%	0.35%	0.57%	0.75%
Native Hawaiian or Pacific Islander alone (NH)	x	x	7	8	16	x	x	0.01%	0.01%	0.02%
Other race alone (NH)	21	16	45	41	182	0.04%	0.03%	0.07%	0.06%	0.23%
Mixed race or Multiracial (NH)	x	x	444	945	3,443	x	x	0.67%	1.27%	4.38%
Hispanic or Latino (any race)	336	528	1,562	3,349	4,384	0.69%	0.92%	2.36%	4.51%	5.58%
Total	48,611	57,494	66,215	74,273	78,607	100.00%	100.00%	100.00%	100.00%	100.00%

=== 2010 census ===
At the 2010 census, there were 74,273 people, 30,676 households, and 21,118 families living in the county. The population density was 118.6 inhabitants per square mile (45.8 inhabitants/km^{2}). There were 38,763 housing units at an average density of 61.9 units per square mile (23.9 units/km^{2}). The racial makeup of the county was 87.8% white, 7.6% black or African American, 0.6% Asian, 0.2% American Indian, 2.3% from other races, and 1.6% from two or more races. Those of Hispanic or Latino origin made up 4.5% of the population. In terms of ancestry,

Of the 30,676 households, 28.2% had children under the age of 18 living with them, 53.8% were married couples living together, 11.2% had a female householder with no husband present, 31.2% were non-families, and 26.2% of all households were made up of individuals. The average household size was 2.40 and the average family size was 2.86. The median age was 43.4 years.

The median income for a household in the county was $42,266 and the median income for a family was $52,332. Males had a median income of $40,943 versus $29,841 for females. The per capita income for the county was $24,055. About 11.8% of families and 16.6% of the population were below the poverty line, including 22.7% of those under age 18 and 9.4% of those age 65 or over.

=== 2000 census ===
At the 2000 census, there were 66,215 people, 27,283 households, and 19,589 families living in the county. The population density was 106 people per square mile (41 people/km^{2}). There were 32,383 housing units at an average density of 52 units per square mile (20 units/km^{2}). The racial makeup of the county was 89.14% White, 8.38% Black or African American, 0.22% Native American, 0.35% Asian, 0.02% Pacific Islander, 1.06% from other races, and 0.82% from two or more races. 2.36% of the population were Hispanic or Latino of any race. 26.5% were of American, 13.1% Irish, 11.9% German and 10.5% English ancestry according to Census 2000.

There were 27,283 households, out of which 28.50% had children under the age of 18 living with them, 57.80% were married couples living together, 10.10% had a female householder with no husband present, and 28.20% were non-families. 24.70% of all households were made up of individuals, and 9.50% had someone living alone who was 65 years of age or older. The average household size was 2.40 and the average family size was 2.85.

In the county, the population was spread out, with 22.90% under the age of 18, 8.00% from 18 to 24, 27.40% from 25 to 44, 26.20% from 45 to 64, and 15.60% who were 65 years of age or older. The median age was 40 years. For every 100 females, there were 96.70 males. For every 100 females age 18 and over, there were 93.50 males.

The median income for a household in the county was $36,666, and the median income for a family was $43,047. Males had a median income of $31,032 versus $22,156 for females. The per capita income for the county was $18,965. About 7.60% of families and 10.80% of the population were below the poverty line, including 14.00% of those under age 18 and 12.90% of those age 65 or over.

== Government and politics ==
A solidly Democratic county for much of its early history like the rest of the South, Oconee has since 1984 swung heavily into the Republican column. The Republican tilt in the county has been increasing in recent years, with 2016, 2020 and 2024 all breaking the record for the strongest Republican showing since Nixon's 1972 landslide.

United States presidential election results for Oconee County, South Carolina
Year	Republican		Democratic		Third party(ies)	
Year	No.	%	No.	%	No.	%
1888	231	15.99%	1,212	83.88%	2	0.14%
1892	220	14.13%	909	58.38%	428	27.49%
1896	199	12.51%	1,392	87.49%	0	0.00%
1900	69	7.32%	873	92.68%	0	0.00%
1904	62	7.93%	720	92.07%	0	0.00%
1912	58	6.54%	760	85.68%	69	7.78%
1916	59	6.23%	885	93.45%	3	0.32%
1920	70	5.31%	1,249	94.69%	0	0.00%
1924	5	0.49%	989	96.30%	33	3.21%
1928	70	5.24%	1,263	94.61%	2	0.15%
1932	14	0.77%	1,803	99.17%	1	0.06%
1936	53	2.51%	2,057	97.49%	0	0.00%
1940	143	8.24%	1,593	91.76%	0	0.00%
1944	106	7.08%	1,316	87.85%	76	5.07%
1948	135	6.90%	666	34.03%	1,156	59.07%
1952	1,624	33.46%	3,230	66.54%	0	0.00%
1956	911	18.99%	3,510	73.17%	376	7.84%
1960	1,886	30.35%	4,328	69.65%	0	0.00%
1964	2,712	32.79%	5,560	67.21%	0	0.00%
1968	2,618	27.94%	2,009	21.44%	4,742	50.61%
1972	6,824	78.19%	1,740	19.94%	164	1.88%
1976	3,805	30.90%	8,447	68.61%	60	0.49%
1980	5,651	41.58%	7,677	56.49%	263	1.94%
1984	8,625	71.61%	3,333	27.67%	86	0.71%
1988	10,184	69.83%	4,299	29.48%	102	0.70%
1992	10,379	50.68%	6,617	32.31%	3,483	17.01%
1996	10,503	52.64%	7,398	37.08%	2,051	10.28%
2000	15,364	65.17%	7,571	32.11%	640	2.71%
2004	18,811	68.32%	8,395	30.49%	326	1.18%
2008	21,164	67.98%	9,481	30.45%	487	1.56%
2012	21,611	70.47%	8,550	27.88%	505	1.65%
2016	24,178	71.88%	7,998	23.78%	1,459	4.34%
2020	29,698	73.03%	10,414	25.61%	556	1.37%
2024	31,772	75.18%	9,987	23.63%	505	1.19%

== Economy ==
In 2022, the GDP was $4.5 billion (about $56,008 per capita), and the real GDP was $3.7 billion (about $45,856 per capita) in chained 2017 dollars.

As of April 2024, some of the largest employers in the county include Apex Tool Group, BorgWarner, CSL Plasma, Duke Energy, Ingles, Itron, Kelly Services, Prisma Health, Sandvik, Schneider Electric, and Walmart.

Employment and wage statistics by industry in Oconee County, South Carolina - Q3 2023
Industry	Employment counts	Employment percentage (%)	Average annual wage ($)
Accommodation and food services	2,150	9.5	20,332
Administrative and support and waste management and remediation services	1,264	5.6	49,244
Agriculture, forestry, fishing and hunting	134	0.6	30,108
Arts, entertainment, and recreation	650	2.9	21,008
Construction	1,665	7.4	51,688
Finance and insurance	587	2.6	67,860
Health care and social assistance	2,887	12.8	64,636
Information	342	1.5	59,540
Management of companies and enterprises	10	0.0	82,212
Manufacturing	5,598	24.8	65,312
Other services (except public administration)	835	3.7	37,700
Professional, scientific, and technical services	760	3.4	67,288
Public administration	1,174	5.2	47,164
Real estate and rental and leasing	254	1.1	48,776
Retail trade	3,628	16.0	33,904
Transportation and warehousing	194	0.9	57,564
Wholesale trade	476	2.1	62,348
Total	22,608	100.0%	50,300

== Communities ==
=== Cities ===
- Seneca (largest community)
- Walhalla (county seat)
- Westminster

=== Towns ===
- Salem
- West Union

=== Census-designated places ===
- Chickasaw Point
- Fair Play (partly in Anderson County)
- Keowee Key
- Longcreek
- Newry
- South Union
- Tamassee
- Utica

=== Unincorporated communities ===
- Corinth
- Madison
- Mountain Rest
- Oakway
- Picket Post
- Richland
- Tokeena Crossroads
- Townville (partly in Anderson County)

== Education ==
There is one school district in the county: Oconee County School District.

The district operates three public high schools:

- Seneca High School
- Walhalla High School
- West-Oak High School

== In popular culture ==
The Oconee region is mentioned in the song "Yankee Bayonet (I Will Be Home Then)" by the indie rock group the Decemberists, on their 2006 album The Crane Wife. The reference is "When I was a girl how the hills of Oconee made a seam to hem me in."

Parts of the film Deliverance were filmed on the Oconee side of the Chattooga River, including specifically some scenes shot in Salem.

== See also ==
- List of counties in South Carolina
- National Register of Historic Places listings in Oconee County, South Carolina
