= Keowee River =

River in the United States of America

Location
- Country: United States
- State: South Carolina

Physical characteristics
- Source
  - location: Oconee County, South Carolina
  - coordinates: 34°58′35″N 82°56′04″W
- Source confluence: Toxaway River & Whitewater River
- Mouth
  - location: Oconee County, South Carolina
  - coordinates: 34°41′44″N 82°52′58″W

The Keowee River is created by the confluence of the Toxaway River and the Whitewater River in northern Oconee County, South Carolina. The confluence is today submerged beneath the waters of Lake Jocassee, a reservoir created by Lake Jocassee Dam.

The Keowee River flows out of Lake Jocassee Dam and into Lake Keowee, a reservoir created by Keowee Dam and Little River Dam. The Keowee River flows out of Keowee Dam to join Twelvemile Creek near Clemson, South Carolina, forming the beginning of the Seneca River, a tributary of the Savannah River. The Keowee River is 25.7 miles (41.4 km) long.

The boundary between the Seneca River and the Keowee River has changed over time. In the Revolutionary War period and early eighteenth century, the upper part of the Seneca River was often called the Keowee River, as it was part of the Cherokee homeland. They also had a town named Keowee.

In current times, the section of the Keowee River between the Keowee Dam and its confluence with Twelvemile Creek is called the Seneca River on many maps, including the official county highway map. Since this area is flooded by Lake Hartwell, formed by damming the Seneca and Tugaloo rivers, it is natural to refer to this section as the Seneca instead of its proper name.

By the early eighteenth century the Cherokee occupied several towns along the upper Keowee River, which were referred to as the Lower Towns. These had long been occupied by indigenous peoples, and each of the larger towns had an earthwork platform mounds built by ancestral people of the South Appalachian Mississippian culture era. The Cherokee typically constructed townhouses, which were their form of public architecture, on top of such mounds if available. Keowee was the principal town of the Lower Towns. Other Cherokee towns on the Keowee River included Etastoe (also spelled Estatoe), and Sugartown (Kulsetsiyi).
