= Battle of the Hook =

Battle of the Hook refers to few engagements during the Korean War. They were:

- First Battle of the Hook, in October 1952
- Second Battle of the Hook, in November 1952
- Third Battle of the Hook, in May 1953
- Fourth Battle of the Hook, part of the Battle of the Samichon River, in July 1953
