= Blue Ridge Railway (1901) =

Railway in South Carolina

The Blue Ridge Railway was a 19th-century railroad in the U.S. state of South Carolina. It was originally chartered in 1852 as the Blue Ridge Railroad of South Carolina. Original plans were for a 195-mile line from Anderson, South Carolina, to Knoxville, Tennessee going through the mountains with as many as 13 tunnels including the incomplete Stumphouse Mountain Tunnel.

By 1859, the railroad had built between Anderson and West Union, South Carolina and substantial work on several tunnels had started. However, with the outbreak of the Civil War, no further work was ever completed on the tunnels despite efforts after the war, including one by the Black Diamond Railroad. A final extension from West Union to Walhalla, South Carolina at the urging of the Town Council and local citizens saw the first train arrive November 14, 1877, but no more track would ever be laid along the alignment up Stumphouse Mountain. In 1880, the Columbia and Greenville Railroad acquired the 34 miles (55 km) of track that had been laid. In 1901 the Southern Railway, successor to the Columbia and Greenville, split out the line as the Blue Ridge Railway.

The Southern leased the Blue Ridge to subsidiary Carolina and Northwestern Railway on July 1, 1951, and eventually merged the company. Passenger service from Belton, South Carolina, through Anderson to Walhalla ended by the latter part of 1951.
