= Lewis G. Watkins =

United States Marine Corps Medal of Honor recipient

Lewis George Watkins
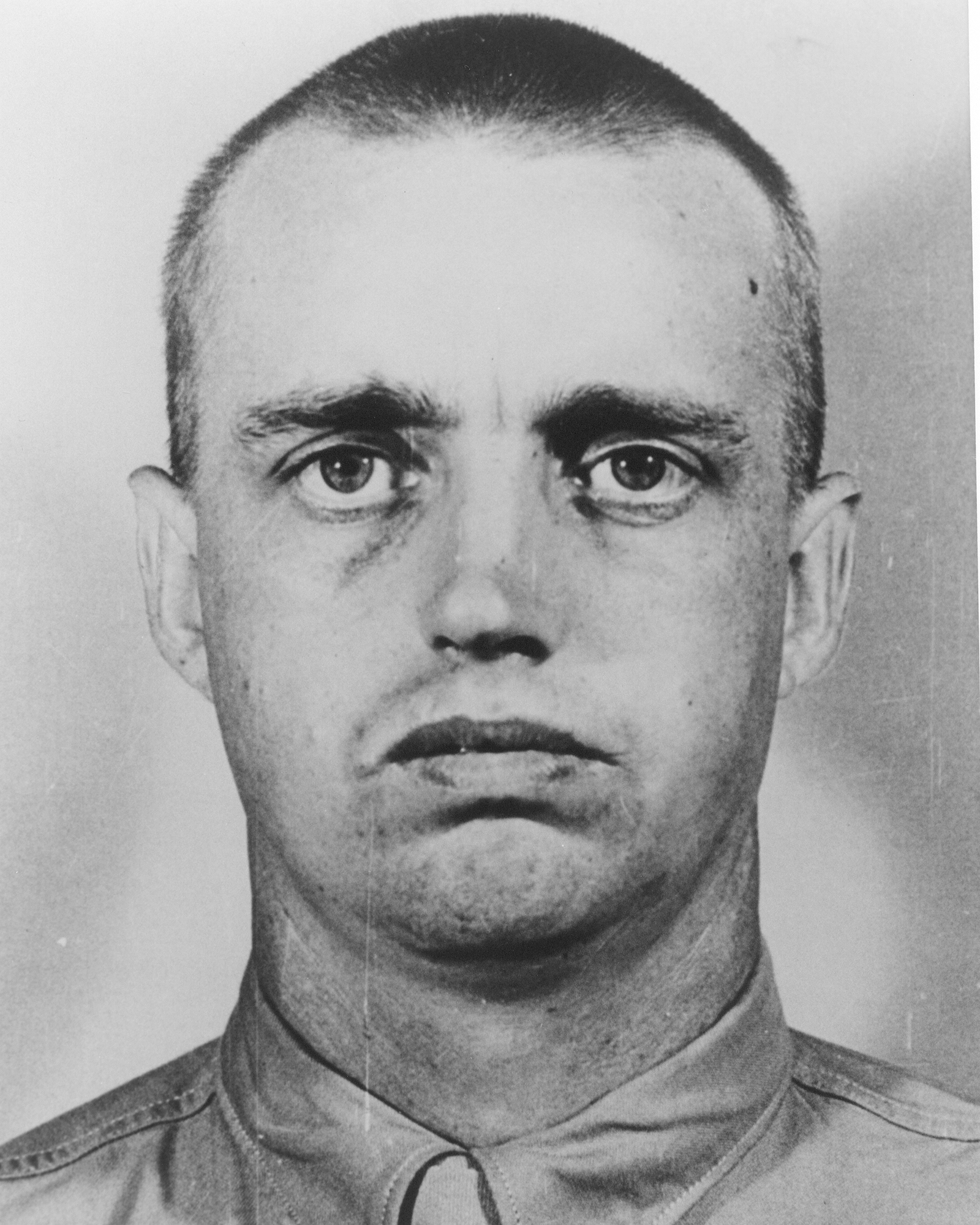
- Lewis G. Watkins, posthumous Medal of Honor recipient
- Born: June 6, 1925; Seneca, South Carolina
- Died: October 7, 1952 (aged 27) near Panmunjom, Korea
- Burial place: National Memorial Cemetery of the Pacific, Honolulu, Hawaii
- Military career
- Allegiance: United States of America
- Branch: United States Marine Corps
- Service years: 1943-1947 (USN); 1950–1952 (USMC)
- Rank: Staff Sergeant
- Units: Company I, 3rd Battalion, 7th Marines, 1st Marine Division
- Conflicts: World War II Korean War: First Battle of the Hook †
- Awards: Medal of Honor; Purple Heart
- Other work: Greenville Police Department

Staff Sergeant Lewis George Watkins (June 6, 1925 – October 7, 1952) was a United States Marine who was killed in the Korean War.

He sacrificed his life to save the lives of fellow Marines under his command and to contribute to the success of his unit's mission during the First Battle of the Hook in the Korean War. For his actions on October 7, 1952, Watkins posthumously received the Medal of Honor.

== Biography ==
Lewis Watkins was born on June 6, 1925, in Seneca, South Carolina. In 1943, he dropped out of high school to join the U.S Navy during World War II.

After returning home, he graduated high school, taking a job as a member of the Greenville Police Department. on September 12, 1950, he enlisted in the United States Marine Corps. After training at Parris Island, South Carolina. He served at Camp Lejeune, North Carolina, and Camp Pendleton, California before being deployed to Korea.

On October 7, 1952, Sergeant Watkins' platoon was assigned to retake an outpost from the enemy. Although wounded in the fight, he placed automatic fire on the enemy machine gun position holding up the assault. When an enemy grenade landed among his men, he shoved them aside, picked up the grenade, and attempted to throw it at the enemy. The grenade exploded in his hand and wounded him mortally.

His parents, Mr. and Mrs. Fred Watkins of Seneca, South Carolina, received notification that their son had been awarded the nation's highest decoration, the Medal of Honor, in a letter from General Lemuel C. Shepherd, Jr., Commandant of the Marine Corps. The Watkins family later donated the medal to the Patriot's Hall Veterans Museum in Walhalla, South Carolina. Lewis Watkins is Oconee County's only Medal of Honor recipient.

== Medal of Honor citation ==
The President of the United States in the name of The Congress takes pleasure in presenting the Medal of Honor to

STAFF SERGEANT LEWIS G. WATKINS
UNITED STATES MARINE CORPS

For conspicuous gallantry and intrepidity at the risk of his life above and beyond the call of duty while serving as a guide of a rifle platoon of Company I, in action against enemy aggressor forces during the hours of darkness on the morning of October 7, 1952. With his platoon assigned the mission of retaking an outpost which had been overrun by the enemy earlier in the night, S/Sgt. Watkins skillfully led his unit in the assault up the designated hill. Although painfully wounded when a well-entrenched hostile force at the crest of the hill engaged the platoon with intense small-arms and grenade fire, he gallantly continued to lead his men. Obtaining an automatic rifle from one of the wounded men, he assisted in pinning down an enemy machine gun holding up the assault. When an enemy grenade landed among Staff Sergeant Watkins and several other Marines while they were moving forward through a trench on the hill crest, he immediately pushed his companions aside, placed himself in a position to shield them and picked up the deadly missile in an attempt to throw it outside the trench. Mortally wounded when the grenade exploded in his hand, Staff Sergeant Watkins, by his great personal valor in the face of almost certain death, saved the lives of several of his comrades and contributed materially to the success of the mission. His extraordinary heroism, inspiring leadership, and resolute spirit of self-sacrifice reflect the highest credit upon himself and enhance the finest traditions of the U.S. Naval Service. He gallantly gave his life for his country.

== Awards and Decorations ==
Staff Sergeant Watkins received the following awards for his service in WWII and Korea

1st row	Medal of Honor		
2nd row	Purple Heart with 5/16 inch star	Combat Action Ribbon Retroactively Awarded, 1999	Navy Unit Commendation
3rd row	Marine Corps Good Conduct Medal	Navy Good Conduct Medal	American Campaign Medal
4th row	World War II Victory Medal	National Defense Service Medal	Korean Service Medal with 3 Campaign stars
5th row	Korean Presidential Unit Citation	United Nations Service Medal Korea	Korean War Service Medal Retroactively Awarded, 2003

== See also ==
- List of Medal of Honor recipients
- List of Korean War Medal of Honor recipients
