= Issaqueena Falls =

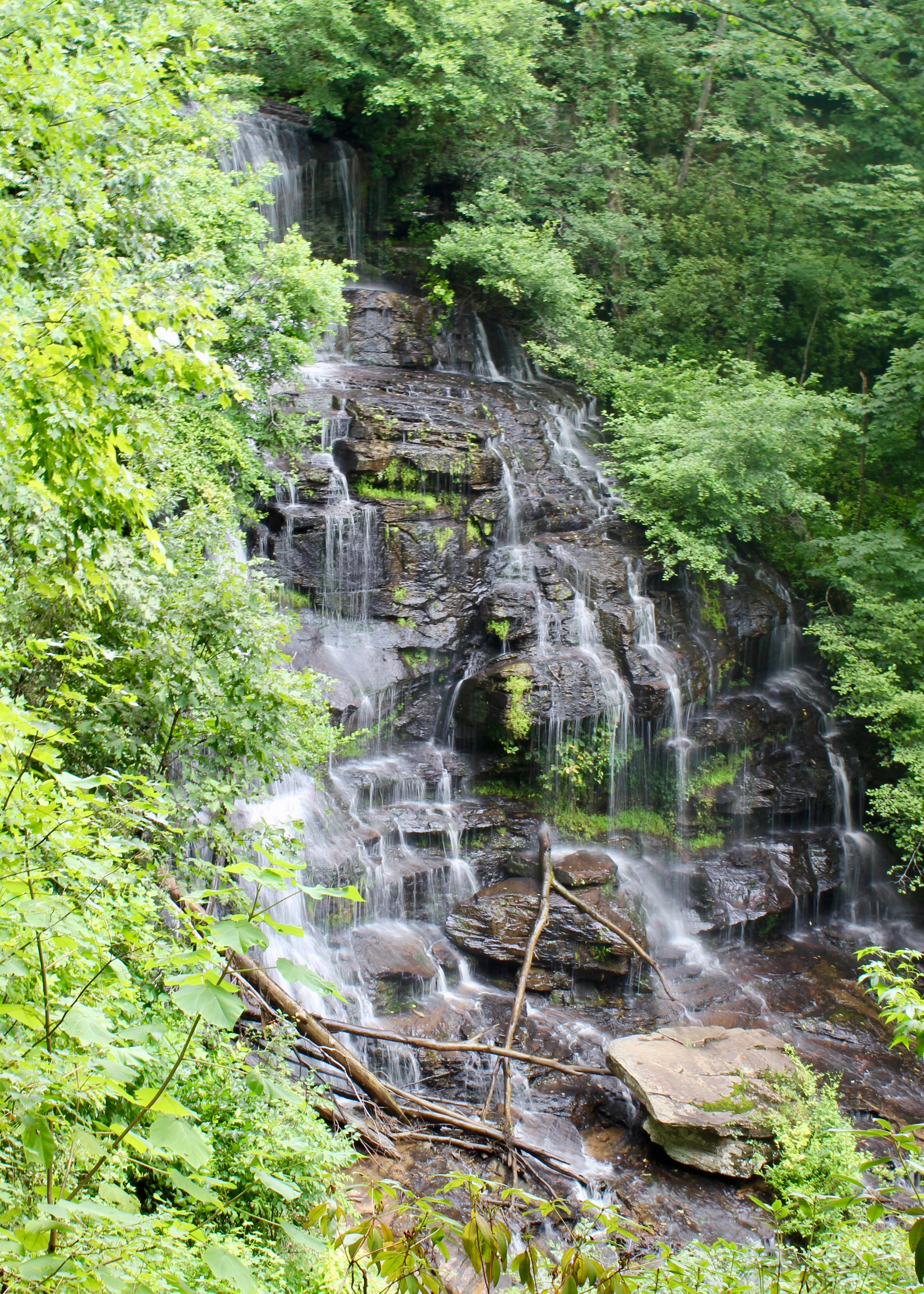
- Issaqueena Falls (2019)
- Interactive map of Issaqueena Falls
- Location: Walhalla, South Carolina
- Coordinates: 34°48′22″N 83°7′16″W
- Type: Cascade
- Elevation: 1,224 ft (373 m)
- Total height: 100 ft (30 m)

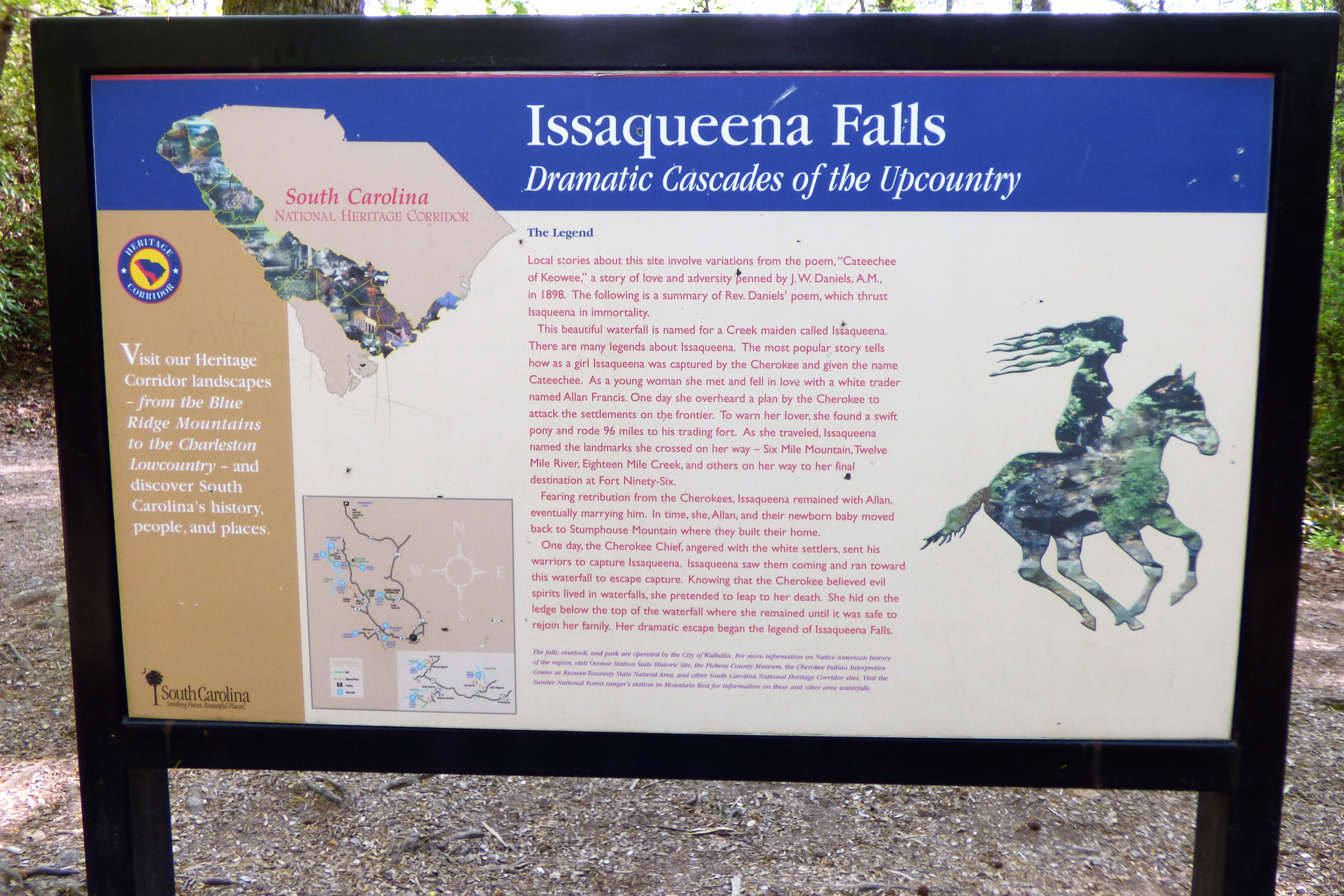
Plaque describing the Legend of Issaqueena Falls

Issaqueena Falls, near Walhalla, South Carolina, is a 100 ft (30 m) high cascade waterfall in the Oconee District of the Sumter National Forest.

The falls are named for a legendary Cherokee girl who is said to have leaped from the top of the falls with her lover, either an Oconee brave, a white trader named Allan Francis, or a white silversmith named David Francis. In the story, Issaqueena and her lover either die together or they land on a ledge out of sight of hostile tribesmen and eventually live happily ever after.

The waterfall is close to another notable local landmark, Stumphouse Tunnel, and a park provides access to both.

== See also ==
- List of waterfalls
