= George H. O'Brien Jr. =

George Herman O'Brien Jr.
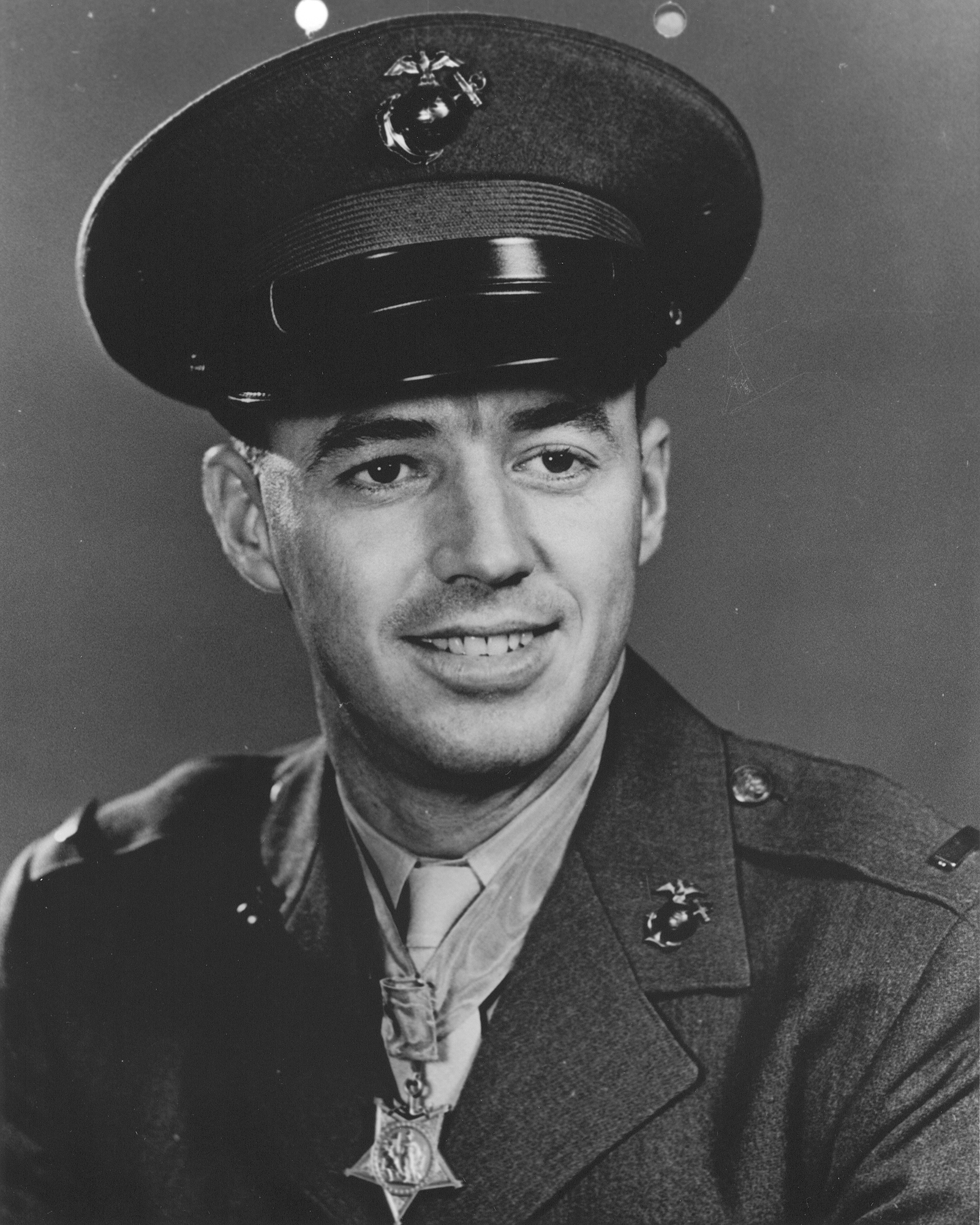
- George H. O'Brien Jr.
- Born: September 10, 1926; Fort Worth, Texas
- Died: March 11, 2005 (aged 78); Midland, Texas
- Burial place: Texas State Cemetery, Austin, Texas
- Education: Texas Tech University (BS)
- Military career
- Allegiance: United States
- Branch: United States Marine Corps
- Service years: 1949–1963
- Rank: Major
- Unit: 3rd Battalion, 7th Marines
- Conflicts: Korean War: First Battle of the Hook
- Awards: Medal of Honor; Purple Heart (2)
- Other work: Petroleum geologist

George Herman O'Brien Jr. (September 10, 1926 – March 11, 2005) was a United States Marine Corps officer who received the Medal of Honor, the United States's highest military decoration, for his actions during the First Battle of the Hook in the Korean War.

== Biography ==
O'Brien was born on September 10, 1926, in Fort Worth, Texas. He graduated from Big Spring High School in Big Spring, Texas, in 1944. From December 1944 until May 1946, he was a seaman in the United States Merchant Marine. He then entered Texas Technological College (now Texas Tech University) where he received a Bachelor of Science degree in geology in May 1950. While in college, he enlisted as a private in the United States Marine Corps Reserve in July 1949.

Ordered to active duty on November 27, 1951, he entered the Officer Candidate School at Quantico, Virginia. He completed that course in February 1952, and entered the Basic Course the following month, graduating in August 1952. After further training at Camp Pendleton, California, he embarked for Korea in September 1952, where he joined the 1st Marine Division.

By October 27, 1952, he was serving as a second lieutenant with Company H of the 3rd Battalion 7th Marines. On that day, he spearheaded the capture of an enemy-held hill while wounded by enemy fire. For this action, he was awarded the Medal of Honor by President Dwight D. Eisenhower during a White House ceremony on October 27, 1953, exactly one year to the day after the action for which he was cited.

He was promoted to major in the Reserve in 1963.

After his military service, O'Brien returned to west Texas and raised a family. He was an active volunteer at the Big Spring Veterans Administration medical center. On March 11, 2005, O'Brien died from complications associated with emphysema and pneumonia in Midland, Texas. He was buried in the Texas State Cemetery in Austin, Texas.

== Medal of Honor citation ==
The President of the United States takes pleasure in presenting the MEDAL OF HONOR to

SECOND LIEUTENANT GEORGE H. O'BRIEN, JR.
UNITED STATES MARINE CORPS RESERVE

for service as set forth in the following CITATION:

For conspicuous gallantry and intrepidity at the risk of his life above and beyond the call of duty as a Rifle Platoon Commander of Company H, Third Battalion, Seventh Marines, First Marine Division (Reinforced), in action against enemy aggressor forces in Korea on 27 October 1952. With his platoon subjected to an intense mortar and artillery bombardment while preparing to assault a vitally important hill position on the main line of resistance which had been overrun by a numerically superior enemy force on the preceding night, Second Lieutenant O'Brien leaped from his trench when the attack signal was given and, shouting for his men to follow raced across an exposed saddle and up the enemy-held hill through a virtual hail of deadly small-arms, artillery and weapon fire. Although shot through the arm and thrown to the ground by hostile automatic-weapons fire as he neared the well-entrenched enemy position, he bravely regained his feet, waved his men onward and continued to spearhead the assault, pausing only long enough to go to the aid of a wounded Marine. Encountering the enemy at close range, he proceeded to hurl hand grenades into the bunkers and, utilizing his carbine to best advantage in savage hand-to-hand combat, succeeded in killing at least three of the enemy. Struck down by the concussion of grenades on three occasions during the subsequent action, he steadfastly refused to be evacuated for medical treatment and continued to lead his platoon in the assault for a period of nearly four hours, repeatedly encouraging his men and maintaining superb direction of the unit. With the attack halted, he set up a defense with his remaining forces to prepare for a counterattack, personally checking each position, attending to the wounded and expediting their evacuation. When a relief of the position was effected by another unit, he remained to cover the withdrawal and to assure that no wounded were left behind. By his exceptionally daring and forceful leadership in the face of overwhelming odds, Second Lieutenant O'Brien served as a constant source of inspiration to all who observed him and was greatly instrumental in the recapture of a strategic position on the main line of resistance. His indomitable determination and valiant fighting spirit reflect the highest credit upon himself and enhance the finest traditions of the United States Naval Service.

/S/ DWIGHT D. EISENHOWER

== Awards and decorations ==

1st row	Medal of Honor		
2nd row	Purple Heart with 5/16 inch star	Combat Action Ribbon Retroactively Awarded, 1999	Navy Unit Commendation
3rd row	National Defense Service Medal with 1 Service star	Korean Service Medal with 3 Campaign stars	Armed Forces Reserve Medal
4th row	Korean Presidential Unit Citation	United Nations Service Medal Korea	Korean War Service Medal Retroactively Awarded, 2003

Merchant Marine Awards

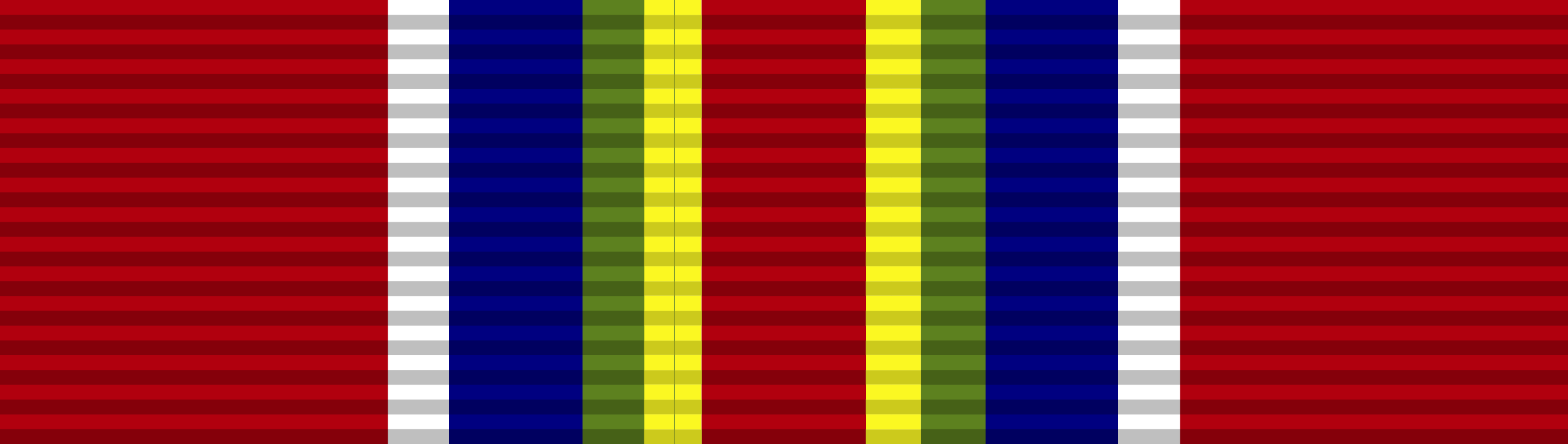

Pacific War Zone Medal	World War II Victory Medal

== Additional honors ==
On April 14, 2005, the Texas State House unanimously passed a House Resolution honoring George H. O'Brien Jr. In turn, on April 15, 2005, the Texas State Senate adopted Senate Resolution Number 399, "In Memory of George Herman O'Brien, Jr."

A scholarship at Texas Tech University which provides funding for U.S. Marines and their children was named in his honor. At the VA medical center where O'Brien volunteered, a statue of his likeness was unveiled in November 2008.

== Quotes ==
- "This Medal of Honor is not mine; I hold it in trust for so many young people who didn't become grandfathers."

== See also ==
- List of Korean War Medal of Honor recipients
