= St. John's Lutheran Church (Walhalla, South Carolina) =

Historic church in South Carolina, United States

- U.S. National Register of Historic Places
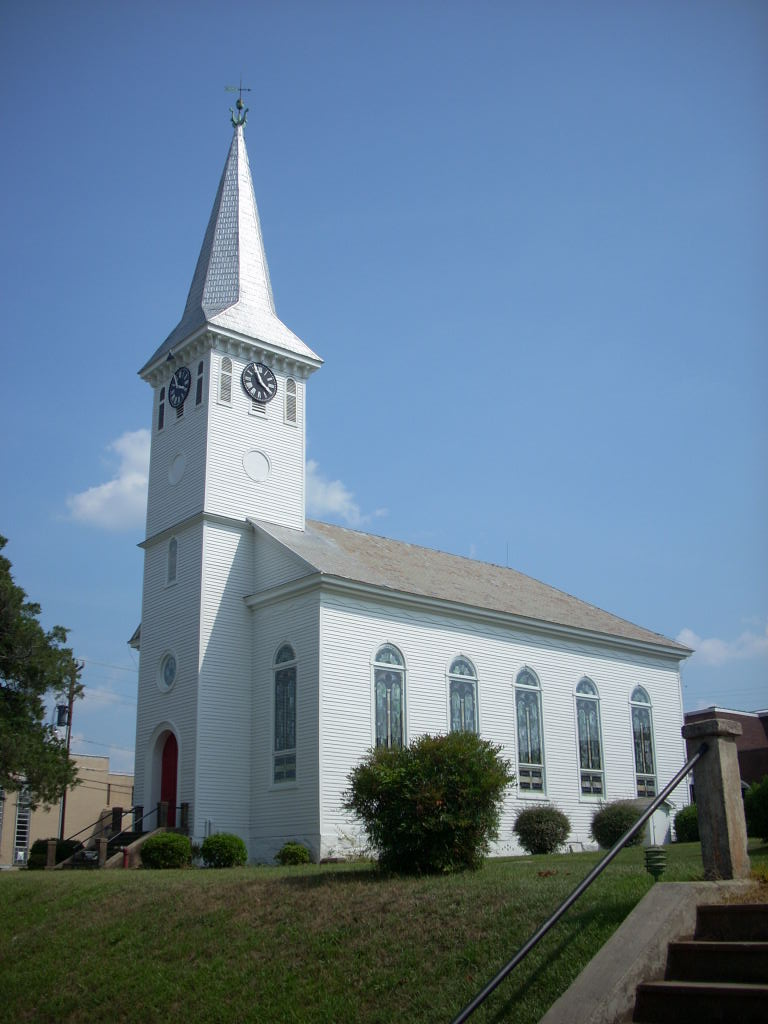

- Location within South Carolina Location within the United States
- Location: 301 W. Main St., Walhalla, South Carolina
- Coordinates: 34°45′54″N 83°4′11″W
- Area: 3.5 acres (1.4 ha)
- Built: 1859
- Architect: Kaufmann, John
- NRHP reference No.: 80003692
- Added to NRHP: November 24, 1980

St. John's Lutheran Church, also known as St. John's German Evangelical Church of Walhalla, is a historic church at 301 W. Main Street in Walhalla, South Carolina. There is a preschool run by the church.

== History ==
The church was built by The German Evangelical Lutheran Congregation due to the nearest church being unduly far for many Walhalla residents. It was planned in 1858, the same year the congregation voted to allow sermons to be held in English, with the ground being cleared in early 1859 and construction finished in 1861. The civil war soon lead to issues with the church's management, as much of the congregation fought in the Confederate Army. Once they came back, the church faced financial issues due to the prevalence of Confederate notes and other useless forms of paper money in the treasury, though this improved through slight ways. In the later 1860s, a bell was added to the church and kerosene lights replaced candles. Eventually, the bell came out of use, presumably before the replacement of the Town Clock and its pairing bell in 1888. This bell is still in use, shaking the building when it sounds. The original plain glass windows were replaced with stained glass in 1910. Until the 1960s, a major source of lighting for the church was a chandelier, now in the foyer of the parish house. The modern Parish House, Church Office, and Fellowship Hall were built from 1969–1971. The Sunday School Building was renovated in 1973–1974. In 1980, it was added to the National Register of Historic Places.
