= Stumphouse Mountain Tunnel =

- Stumphouse Tunnel Complex
- U.S. National Register of Historic Places
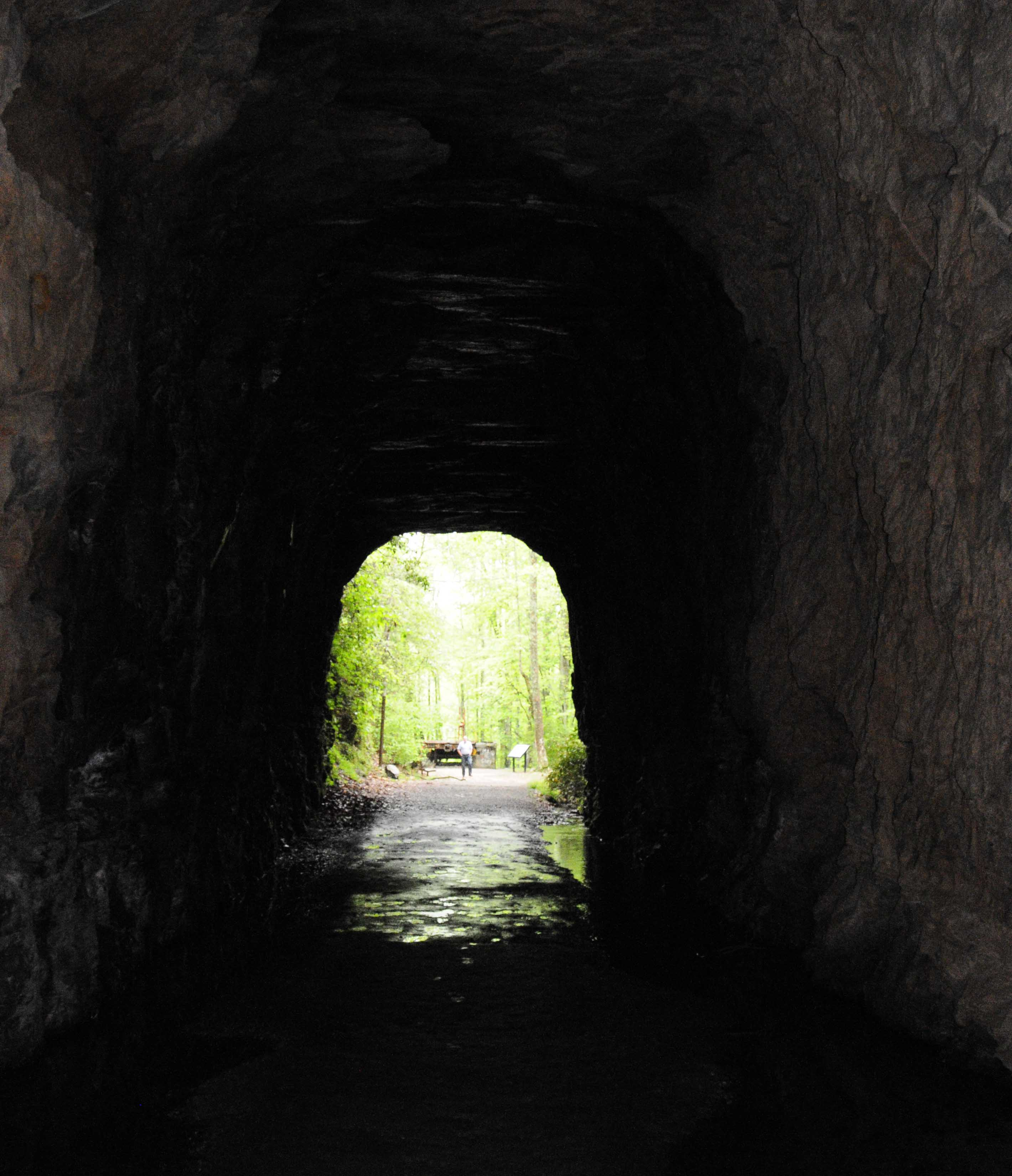

- Location within South Carolina Location within the United States
- Location: Oconee County
- Nearest city: Walhalla, South Carolina
- Coordinates: 34°48′38.39″N 83°07′25.32″W
- Area: 42 acres (17 ha)
- Built: 1853
- Architect: Bangs, Anson, & Co.
- NRHP reference No.: 71000793
- Added to NRHP: April 7, 1971

Stumphouse Mountain Tunnel in Oconee County, South Carolina is an incomplete railroad tunnel for the Blue Ridge Railroad of South Carolina in Sumter National Forest. The tunnel, along with nearby Issaqueena Falls, are now a Walhalla city park.

It was listed on the National Register of Historic Places in 1971.

== History ==
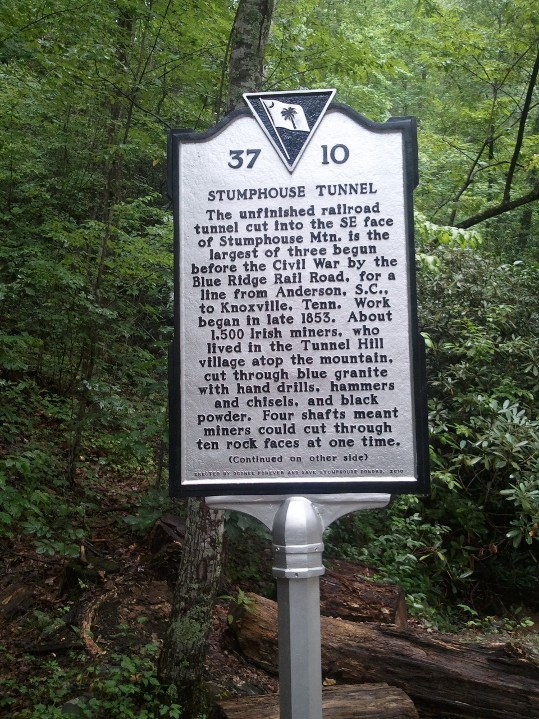
Sign near entrance to the tunnel

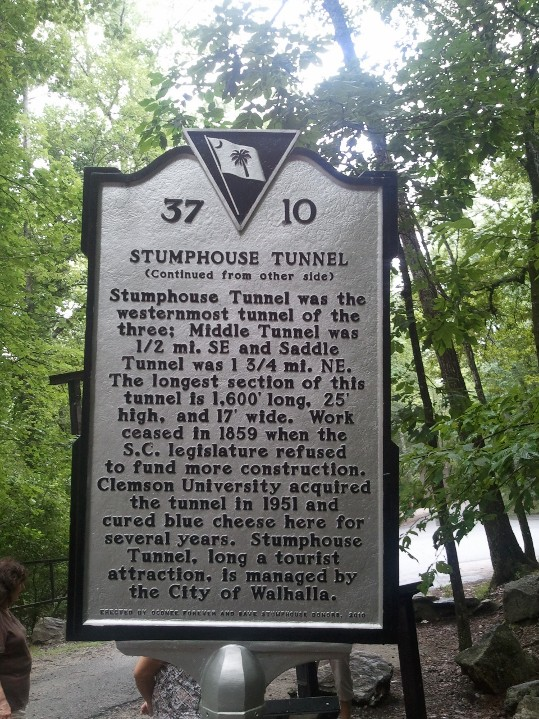
Back of sign

The tunnel was first proposed in 1835 by residents of Charleston, South Carolina as a new and shorter route for the Blue Ridge Railroad between Charleston and the Ohio River valley area which until then was only accessible by bypassing the mountains entirely to the South and then traveling up north through Georgia and middle Tennessee. In 1852, 13 miles of tunnel were proposed to cross the Blue Ridge Mountains through South Carolina, North Carolina, and into Tennessee. Construction on the railway was begun in the late 1850s and was successful through most of South Carolina until hitting the mountains around Wallhalla in Oconee County. There Stumphouse tunnel along with three other tunnels was to be built.

Construction on Stumphouse tunnel began in 1856 when the George Collyer Company of London brought many Irish workers into the area for this project. Many of the workers lived in housing on top of Stumphouse mountain called Tunnel Hill. By 1859, the State of South Carolina had spent over a million dollars on the tunnel and refused to spend any more on the project, therefore the tunnel work was abandoned. The tunnel had been excavated to a length of 1,617 feet of the planned 5,863 total feet. Today, where the tunnel was meant to end on the other side of the mountain, there remains a mound of earth (intended for the railway tracks) submerged during the summer months under Crystal Lake, located just west of Highway 28.

As a part of the planned Blue Ridge Railroad, two other tunnels were begun in the 1850s and are all connected by terrain at railroad grade. Middle Tunnel, a quarter mile from Stumphouse Tunnel was successfully completed but mostly collapsed and was partially sealed off in the mid-1900s. It is only accessible by foot. Saddle Tunnel, the last of the South Carolina complex was also begun for a short distance 1.5 miles north of Middle Tunnel. Saddle is partially completed yet is mostly submerged by a small lake. Only the entrance to the tunnel is visible.

Beginning in the 1950s, Stumphouse tunnel was used by Clemson University to grow blue cheese until the 1970s when the blue cheese operation was relocated to air-conditioned cheese ripening rooms where the tunnel environment was duplicated.

Today, Stumphouse tunnel is operated as a public park along with nearby Isaqueena Falls by the city of Walhalla. It is open daily except Christmas Day and during inclement weather from 10am until 5pm. Inside the tunnel the temperature is a constant 50 degrees Fahrenheit (10 degrees Celsius) with humidity of 85%. The tunnel is easily accessible by foot, a few yards from a gravel parking lot. The structural integrity of the tunnel is solid and almost no cracking is apparent minus an enlarged vent halfway through the tunnel. In 1999 this vent was impacted by a rock slide, however in 2000 the town of Walhalla re-excavated the tunnel and safely returned it to public use.

After a developer attempted to purchase the property from the City of Walhalla in 2007, Naturaland Trust, a conservation agency created by C. Thomas Wyche, pledged about $2 million to protect the surrounding property; and a consortium of non-profit conservation groups, private individuals, and the state of South Carolina provided the money and resources to preserve the mountain for public use.
