= Third Battle of the Hook =

1953 battle of the Korean War

- Part of the Korean War
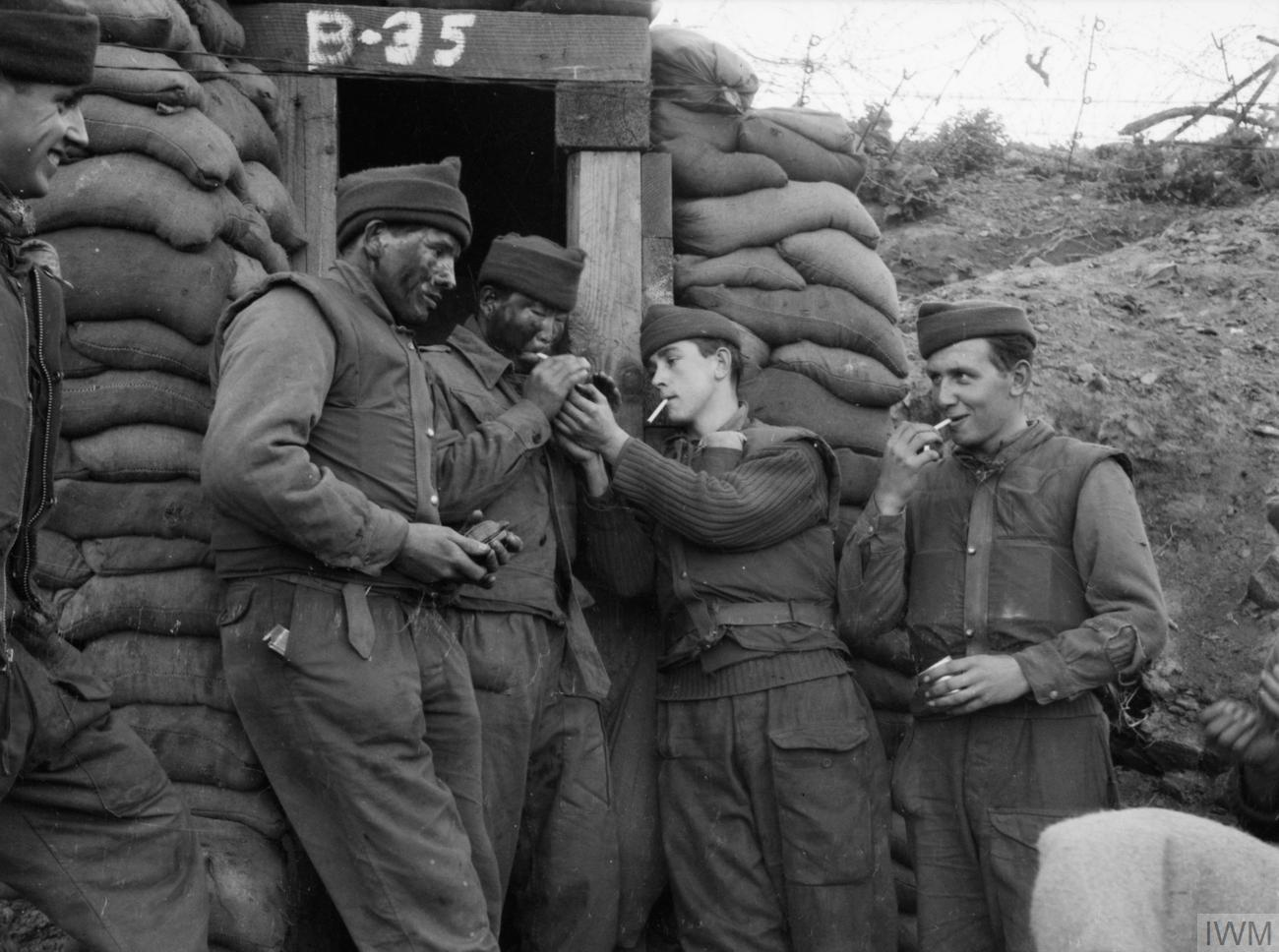
- Soldiers of the British Duke of Wellington's Regiment share a smoke with a KATCOM during a lull in fighting at the Hook.
Date	28–29 May 1953
Location	near Panmunjom, North Korea 38°01′44.8″N 126°50′33″E
Result	United Nations victory: Retention of original hill positions.

Belligerents
United Nations: United Kingdom; United States; Canada; Turkey; South Korea	China: 133rd Division, 46th Corps (People's Republic of China)

Commanders and leaders
(United Kingdom) Brigadier Joseph Kendrew	Unknown

Strength
1,500	6,500

Casualties and losses
24 killed 105 wounded 20 missing Chinese claim: 160 casualties 21 captured	UN estimate: 1,050 killed 800 wounded

The Third Battle of the Hook (Chinese: 坪村南山战斗) was a battle of the Korean War that took place between a United Nations Command (UN) force, consisting mostly of British troops, supported on their flanks by American, Canadian and Turkish units against a predominantly Chinese force.

== Background ==
By 1953, elements of the UN forces were engaged in fierce fighting to prevent the Chinese People's Volunteer Army (PVA) forces from gaining ground, prior to a possible ceasefire. This was to deny them additional bargaining power, during negotiations.

One such action took place at a feature called 'the Hook', a crescent shaped ridge near the Samichon River, a tributary of the Imjin River near Kaesong. There had been two previous engagements at the Hook earlier in the Korean War during 1952, when the first battle for the Hook took place. The United States Marine Corps in October, and later the Scottish Black Watch regiment in November, had held the Hook during the second battle, against PVA assaults. This ridge was a place of tactical importance in the 1st Commonwealth Division sector: it was a potential attack route which the PVA needed to take before assaulting Yong Dong, and opening up an invasion route to Seoul, the South Korean capital.

On 13 May 1953, the 1st Battalion the Duke of Wellington's Regiment ('the Dukes') were moved from their position on Yong Dong, to relieve the Black Watch, who had been defending The Hook. During this period, the Black Watch had suffered 12 soldiers killed, 73 wounded and 20 missing. Over the next two weeks 'The Dukes' were under constant sniper, mortar and artillery fire. This was then followed up in a major action over the 28–29 May following heavy initial artillery and mortar fire, after which the PVA infantry attacked in force. Between 19 May and 29 May 'The Dukes' suffered 15 killed in action, 95 wounded and 32 missing. They were relieved by the Royal Fusiliers later in the day of 29 May.

== Battle ==
The PVA forces charged the forward British positions once the bombardment ceased. The Dukes were outnumbered by 5 to 1. The fighting that ensued was bloody and akin to the battles that the 'Dukes' had fought during World War I. Artillery shells rained down on the Hook, from both the PVA and UN forces. The PVA launched a second attack but were cut down by heavy artillery fire from UN forces. Further attacks occurred during the day, but all were defeated in heavy fighting.

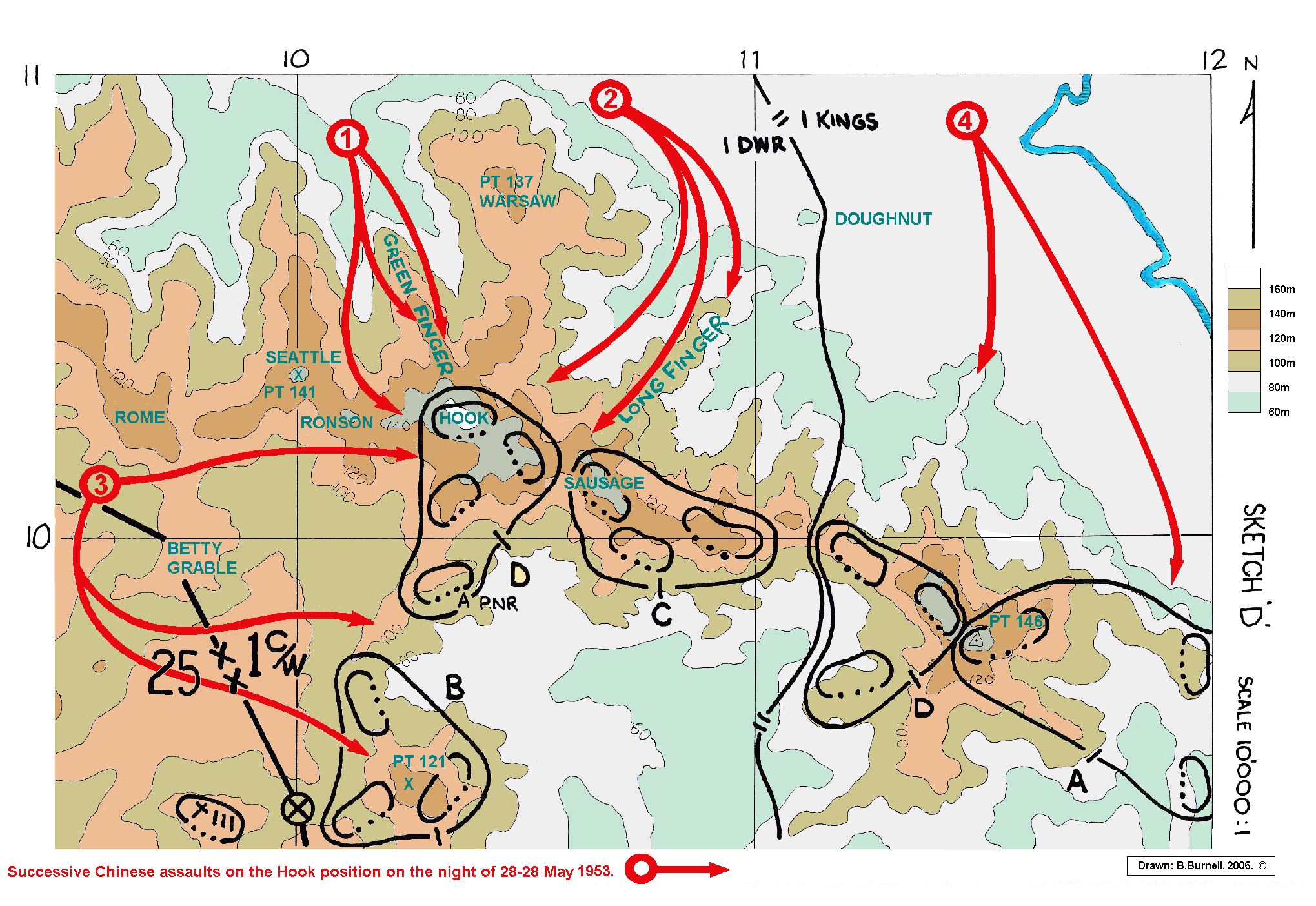
Successive Chinese assaults on the Hook position defended by the 1st Battalion, The Duke of Wellington's Regiment on the night of 28 May 1953. The fourth Chinese assault on the right flank of 1 battalion, the Duke of Wellington's was repulsed by the 1st Battalion, The King's Regiment, with the aid of artillery support.

Just 30 minutes into 29 May, the PVA forces launched another attack, but they were again beaten back. The Dukes began advancing up the line of the original trenches to dislodge the remaining PVA in the forward trenches. The 'Dukes' secured the Hook at 03:30. For their action they were awarded the Battle Honour 'The Hook'.

=== Chinese shelling ===
Between 19 May and 29 May, PVA artillery fired over 20,000 shells onto the Hook position, and 11,000 of these shells were fired on the night of 28 May, with over 200 heavy calibre shells hitting the Hook positions in the one hour between 17:45 and 18:45.

=== United Nations shelling ===
37,818 shells of all calibres were fired by British artillery and the US Army I Corps artillery, including 155 mm, 8-inch, and 240 mm shells and 325 rockets from a US Rocket Battery. Firing directly upon the enemy, the Centurions of C Squadron, 1st Royal Tank Regiment used 504 20-pdr shells (the tanks also fired 22,500 rounds from their machine guns).

== Aftermath ==
PVA casualties were 167 by body count, while their actual casualties were estimated at 1,050 killed and over 800 wounded.

The 'Dukes' suffered 3 officers and 17 other ranks killed, 2 officers and 84 other ranks wounded, with 20 men missing. There were other casualties from other supporting units listed below. In addition, there were a further 50 casualties from artillery and mortar attacks between 10 May and 28 May.

Casualties from other supporting units:

- 20th Field Regiment RA – 2 men killed, 4 wounded.
- 61st Light Regiment RA – 1 men killed, 7 wounded.
- 1st Battalion King's Regiment – 7 men wounded.
- 1st Battalion Black Watch – 1 men wounded (attached to 1DWR)
- KATCOMs – 1 men killed.
- Total UN casualties – 24 killed, 105 wounded, 20 missing (149 total)

For their action, the Duke of Wellington's Regiment was awarded the Battle Honour The Hook 1953. Later, the 1st Battalion's Headquarter Company was renamed "Hook Company".

Shortly after on 2 June 1953, to mark the Coronation of Queen Elizabeth II the division's artillery fired red, white and blue smoke shells onto the PVA lines (a "feu de joie"), followed by a salute from Centurion tanks which fired HE shells onto a single target.

The Hook was defended on a fourth occasion immediately prior to the armistice by an Australian infantry battalion, a New Zealand artillery regiment and two US infantry regiments, supported by British tanks, during the Battle of the Samichon River.

== See also ==
- First Battle of the Hook
- Second Battle of the Hook
