= Jack W. Kelso =

United States Marine Corps Medal of Honor recipient

Jack William Kelso
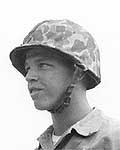
- Kelso in c. 1951
- Born: January 23, 1934; Madera, California, United States
- Died: October 2, 1952 (aged 18) near Panmunjom, Korea
- Burial place: Washington Colony Cemetery, Fresno, California
- Military career
- Allegiance: United States
- Branch: United States Marine Corps
- Service years: 1951–1952
- Rank: Private First Class
- Units: Company I, 3rd Battalion, 7th Marines, 1st Marine Division
- Conflicts: Korean War: Battle of Bunker Hill (WIA); First Battle of the Hook (DOW)
- Awards: Medal of Honor; Silver Star; Purple Heart (2)

Jack William Kelso (January 23, 1934 – October 2, 1952) was a United States Marine who was posthumously awarded the Medal of Honor for his actions on the night of October 2, 1952, during the First Battle of the Hook in the Korean War. He was killed while covering the escape of fellow Marines from a besieged bunker. He was the 31st Marine to receive the United States's highest military decoration for valor during the Korean War.

== Early life ==
Jack William Kelso was born on January 23, 1934, in Madera, California, and attended grade and high school in Caruthers, California. He worked on his father's farm until he enlisted in the Marine Corps on May 15, 1951, at age 17.

== Military career ==
Kelso completed his recruit training in Marine Corps Recruit Depot San Diego, California, in July 1951 and that September was ordered from San Diego to Camp Pendleton, California. In January 1952, he left for Hawaii, where he served until April 1952.

He embarked for Korea with Company I, 3rd Battalion, 7th Marines, 1st Marine Division as a rifleman. He earned the Silver Star for gallantry in action on August 13 to 15, 1952. Kelso made some 20 trips through enemy mortar and artillery fire to carry ammunition from his company to another unit defending an important hill. Although the heat and enemy fire forced most of the men to be relieved after three trips, he continued to carry up ammunition and return with casualties until he collapsed and had to be evacuated.

On the night of October 2, 1952, Kelso was serving at a vital outpost near Sokcho, Korea, when a numerically superior enemy attack, under cover of small arms, grenade and mortar fire, made casualties of both his platoon commander and platoon sergeant. After exposing himself to a hail of enemy fire to try to reorganize the unit, he was driven to cover with four other Marines in a nearby bunker, where an enemy grenade landed among them. He picked it up, ran into the open and threw it back at the enemy, receiving painful wounds as the grenade exploded on leaving his hand. He was again forced into the shelter by even more intense enemy fire, but refused to remain there. Moving out into the fire-swept area, he fired away at the enemy until he was mortally wounded, thereby covering the escape of the other Marines from the bunker. For his "conspicuous gallantry" in this final action, he was awarded the Medal of Honor. He was also posthumously awarded two Purple Hearts.

His body was returned to the United States for burial. His remains are buried in Washington Colony Cemetery, Fresno, California.

== Awards and decorations ==

1st row	Medal of Honor		Silver Star
2nd row	Purple Heart w/ 5/16" Gold Star	Combat Action Ribbon	Navy Presidential Unit Citation
3rd row	Marine Corps Good Conduct Medal	National Defense Service Medal	Korean Service Medal with 3 Campaign stars
4th row	Korean Presidential Unit Citation	United Nations Service Medal Korea	Korean War Service Medal

=== Medal of Honor citation ===
Kelso's Medal of Honor citation reads:

The President of the United States in the name of The Congress takes pride in presenting the MEDAL OF HONOR posthumously to

PRIVATE JACK W. KELSO
UNITED STATES MARINE CORPS

for service as set forth in the following

CITATION:

For conspicuous gallantry and intrepidity at the risk of his life above and beyond the call of duty while serving as a Rifleman of Company I, Third Battalion, Seventh Marines, First Marine Division (Reinforced), in action against enemy aggressor forces in Korea on 2 October 1952. When both the platoon commander and the platoon sergeant became casualties during the defense of a vital outpost against a numerically superior enemy force attacking at night under cover of intense small-arms, grenade and mortar fire, Private KELSO bravely exposed himself to the hail of enemy fire in a determined effort to reorganize the unit and to repel the onrushing attackers. Forced to seek cover, along with four other Marines, in a near-by bunker which immediately came under attack, he unhesitatingly picked up an enemy grenade which landed in the shelter, rushed out into the open and hurled it back at the enemy. Although painfully wounded when the grenade exploded as it left his hand, and again forced to seek the protection of the bunker when the hostile fire became more intensified, Private Kelso refused to remain in his position of comparative safety and moved out into the fire-swept area to return the enemy fire, thereby permitting the pinned-down Marines in the bunker to escape. Mortally wounded while providing covering fire for his comrades, Private KELSO, by his valiant fighting spirit, aggressive determination and self-sacrificing efforts in behalf of others, served to inspire all who observed him. His heroic actions sustain and enhance the highest traditions of the United States Naval Service. He gallantly gave his life for his country.

/S/ DWIGHT D. EISENHOWER

=== Silver Star citation ===
Citation:

The President of the United States of America takes pride in presenting the Silver Star (Posthumously) to Private Jack William Kelso (MCSN: 1190839), United States Marine Corps, for conspicuous gallantry and intrepidity in action against the enemy while serving with Company I, Third Battalion, Seventh Marines, FIRST Marine Division (Reinforced), in action against enemy aggressor forces in Korea, from 13 to 15 August 1952. With the company engaged in supporting another company during the defense of a vitally important hill position far forward of the main line of resistance, Private Kelso carried out approximately twenty trips over hazardous terrain in the face of intense enemy mortar and artillery fire to bring urgently needed ammunition and supplies to the company and assisted casualties back on return trips. Despite the intense head and heavy enemy fire, he refused to be relieved and continued his courageous actions until he collapsed and was evacuated. By his resourceful initiative, marked fortitude and unyielding devotion to duty, Private Kelso served to inspire all who observed him and upheld the highest traditions of the United States Naval Service.

== See also ==
- List of Korean War Medal of Honor recipients
