= Cornelia Strong =

American academic (1877–1955)

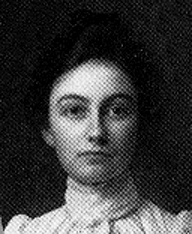
- Strong in 1903
- Born: 1877; Walhalla, South Carolina, U.S.
- Died: June 3, 1955; Greensboro, North Carolina, U.S.
- Resting place: Walhalla, South Carolina, U.S.
- Education: Agnes Scott Institute
- Alma mater: Cornell University; University of Michigan
- Occupation(s): academic, professor, mathematician, astronomer
- Parent(s): Hugh Strong; Cornelia Harris Gregg

Cornelia Strong (1877 – June 3, 1955) was an American academic, astronomer, and mathematician. She was a professor at the Woman's College of the University of North Carolina, where she taught mathematics and astronomy, from 1905 to 1948. Strong founded the astronomy program at the Woman's College in 1931. A residence hall and a residential college at the University of North Carolina at Greensboro, as the Woman's College was later named when it became a coeducational institution, were named in her honor.

== Early life and education ==
Strong was born in Walhalla, South Carolina, in 1877 to Hugh Strong, a Presbyterian minister, and Cornelia Harris Gregg. She was of Irish descent. Strong was educated at the Agnes Scott Institute, a private Presbyterian school for girls and one of the Seven Sisters schools of the South.

She obtained a Bachelor of Arts degree from Cornell University in 1903. While a student at Cornell, Strong was elected into Sigma Xi, an honor society for science and engineering students. After graduation, she moved to North Carolina to teach. While working in North Carolina, she completed summer school programs at Harvard University, the University of California, the University of Colorado, and the University of Wisconsin. Strong completed a master's degree in mathematics and astronomy at the University of Michigan in 1931.

== Career ==
In 1903, after graduating from Cornell, Strong taught at Queens College in Charlotte, North Carolina.

In 1905, Strong joined the faculty at the State Normal and Industrial College, a women's college in Greensboro, North Carolina, that was part of the University of North Carolina system. During her forty-three year tenure, the school's name changed to the North Carolina College for Women in 1919 and then to the Woman's College of the University of North Carolina in 1932. As a mathematics professor she worked to provide a variety of careers for her students upon graduation, including as teachers and as "human computers" in the National Advisory Committee on Aeronautics and the National Aeronautics and Space Administration. In 1931, upon completing her graduate degree, Strong began teaching the first astronomy courses at the North Carolina College for Women. She would hold class meetings at four o'clock in the morning to view the rings of Saturn, the moons of Jupiter, constellations, and Lunar craters through a telescope. She taught a lecture titled The Telescope: A Chapter in Modern Science.

At one point she took a leave of absence from teaching to return to Cornell and help John Henry Tanner, one of her former professors, write a high school algebra textbook.

As well as working as a professor, Strong served on various campus committees. From 1913 to 1937 she was the chairwoman of the Committee on Advanced Standing, which evaluated the academic records of alumnae from the first years of the college's history in order to determine the amount of work needed to meet current degree requirements. She also served on the Loan Committee, the Curriculum Committee, the Consolidated University Administrative Council, the Mendenhall Scholarship Committee, and as a faculty advisor. She was the chairwoman of the Loan Committee from 1937 to 1948. She also represented the Woman's College on the Administrative Council of the Consolidated University.

Strong retired from teaching in 1948. Prior to her retirement, she wrote a poem addressed to the college's mathematics majors.

== Personal life ==
Strong was known to pick flowers from her garden and deliver small bouquets to new faculty members. She was known to make Christmas packages and Easter remembrances for faculty's children, as well as baskets of fresh vegetables for faculty. When one of her former students, Barbara Mangum Bowland, announced her engagement, Strong sent her a blue satin wedding slipper with a four leaf clover pressed on it and covered with net, enclosed with the verse, "A bride must have something old — and something new — and a four leaf clover in the heel of her shoe."

She was a member of the Mathematical Association of America, the North Carolina Educational Association, the North Carolina Academy of Science, and the Astronomy Club of Greensboro. A devout Presbyterian, she was a parishioner at the Church of the Covenant. She taught Bible classes at the church, as well as at the Woman's College and the local Young Women's Christian Association.

== Death and legacy ==
Strong died on June 3, 1955, at Wesley Long Hospital in Greensboro after having been hospitalized for six weeks. A Presbyterian funeral service was conducted at the chapel of Forbis & Murray Funeral Home. She was buried in Walhalla, South Carolina.

In November 1955, she was honored posthumously at the faculty council, where members of the mathematics department read a tribute to her.

In 1960, a new residence hall at the Woman's College campus, the Moore-Strong Residence Hall, was named after Strong and Mary Taylor Moore, a member of the class of 1903 who served as a registrar from 1909 to 1948. In 1994, the Cornelia Strong College was officially established by the College of Arts and Sciences at the University of North Carolina at Greensboro, as the Woman's College was named after becoming a coeducational institution. The Cornelia Strong College was later moved from the Moore-Strong Residence Hall to Guilford Hall.
