= Sherrod E. Skinner Jr. =

United States Marine Corps Medal of Honor recipient

Sherrod Emerson Skinner Jr.
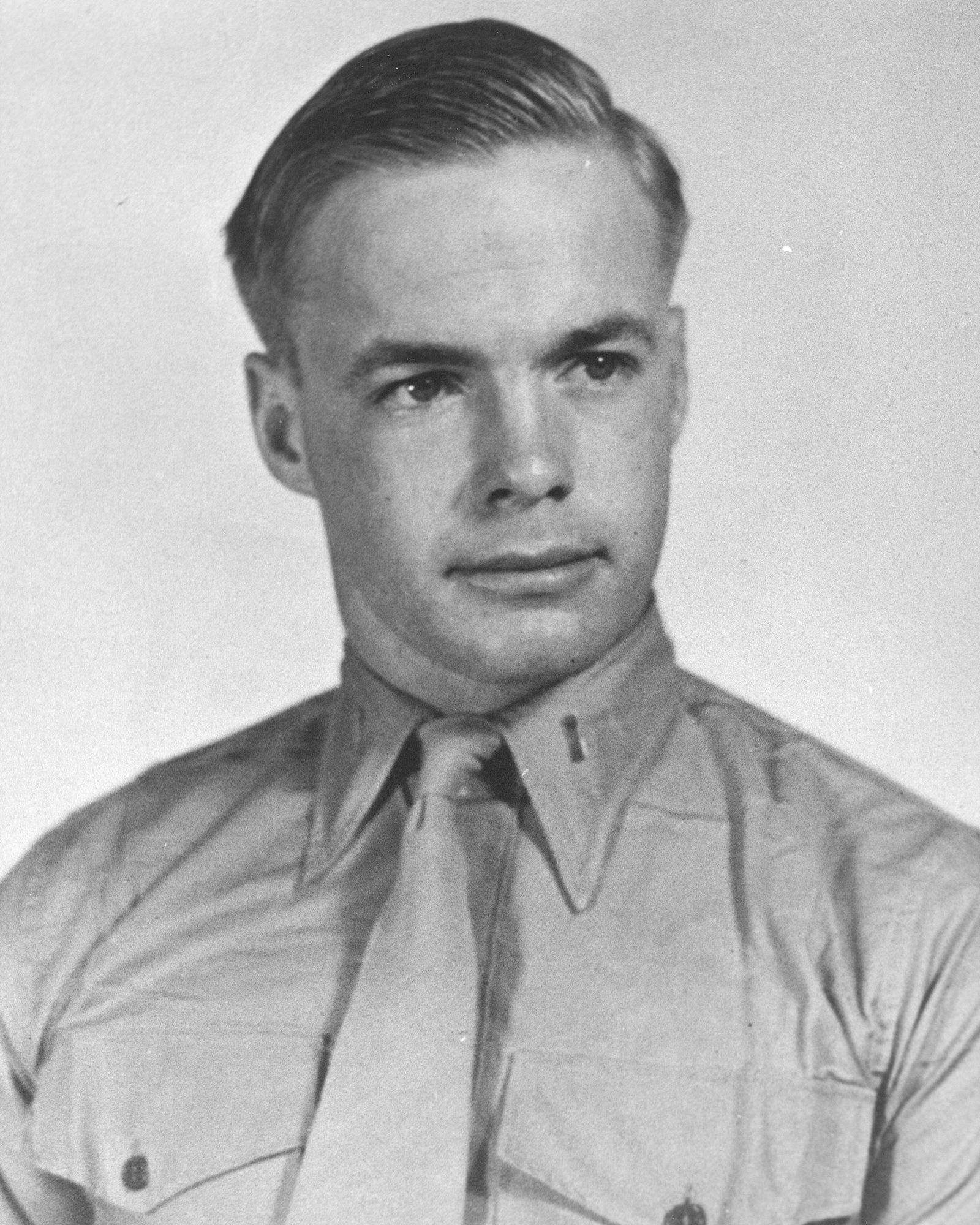
- Sherrod E. Skinner Jr., posthumous Medal of Honor recipient
- Born: October 29, 1929; Hartford, Connecticut, US
- Died: October 26, 1952 (aged 22) near Panmunjom, Korea
- Burial place: Arlington National Cemetery
- Military career
- Allegiance: United States of America
- Branch: United States Marine Corps
- Service years: 1948–1952
- Rank: Second Lieutenant
- Unit: 2nd Battalion, 11th Marines
- Conflicts: Korean War: First Battle of the Hook †
- Awards: Medal of Honor; Purple Heart

Sherrod Emerson Skinner Jr. (October 29, 1929 – October 26, 1952) was a United States Marine Corps officer who sacrificed his life in defense of his outpost and fellow Marines during the First Battle of the Hook in the Korean War. For his actions on October 26, 1952, 1stLt Skinner was posthumously awarded the United States of America's highest military honor – the Medal of Honor.

== Biography ==
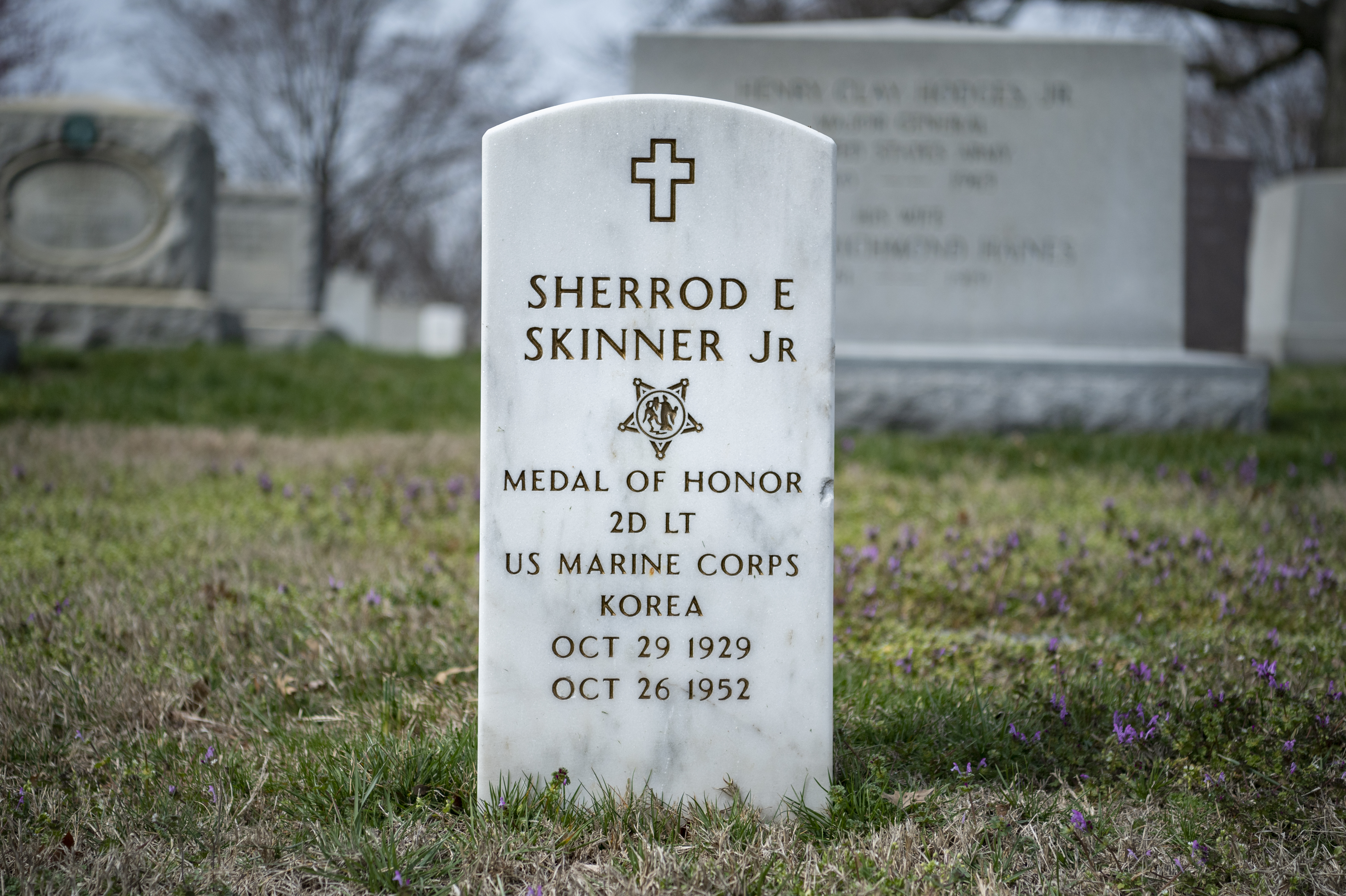
Grave at Arlington National Cemetery

Sherrod Emerson Skinner Jr. was born October 29, 1929, in Hartford, Connecticut. He attended grammar school in East Lansing, Michigan. In 1947, he graduated from Milton Academy, Milton, Massachusetts, and entered Harvard University. While at Harvard, he and his twin brother, David, entered the Marine Corps Reserve Platoon Leaders program, serving on active duty during the summers of 1948 and 1949. He was appointed a second lieutenant in the Marine Corps Reserve on October 9, 1951, and ordered to active duty the following day.

In March 1952, after completing the Marine Officers Basic School at Quantico, Virginia, 2ndLt Skinner entered the Battery Officer Course in the Artillery School, Fort Sill, Oklahoma, and completed the artillery course in July 1952. He then trained at Camp Pendleton, California, until he left for Korea.

Second Lieutenant Skinner was a forward artillery observer with the 11th Marines, 1st Marine Division, in a vital forward outpost when it was attacked by the enemy under cover of heavy artillery fire. He continued the defense of the position until ammunition was exhausted and then directed his men to feign death as the enemy overran the position. When a grenade was thrown among the Marines, he threw himself on it, sacrificing his own life to protect his men.

His parents were notified by General Lemuel C. Shepherd Jr., Commandant of the Marine Corps, that their son was the 25th Marine to be awarded the nation's highest decoration since the start of the Korean War. The medal was presented to his parents at the Marine Barracks, Washington, D.C. by then-Vice President Richard Nixon on September 9, 1953.

Second Lieutenant Skinner's remains were returned to Arlington National Cemetery for burial in January 1953.

== Decorations ==
In addition to the Medal of Honor and Purple Heart, 2dLt Skinner was entitled to the National Defense Service Medal, the Korean Service Medal with one bronze star and the United Nations Service Medal.

== Medal of Honor citation ==
The President of the United States takes pride in presenting the MEDAL OF HONOR posthumously to

Second Lieutenant Sherrod E. Skinner Jr.
United States Marine Corps Reserve

for service as set forth in the following citation:

For conspicuous gallantry and intrepidity at the risk of his life above and beyond the call of duty as an Artillery Forward Observer of Battery F, Second Battalion, Eleventh Marines, First Marine Division (Reinforced), in action against enemy aggressor forces in Korea on the night of October 26, 1952. When his observation post in an extremely critical and vital sector of the main line of resistance was subjected to a sudden and fanatical attack by hostile forces, supported by a devastating barrage of artillery and mortar fire which completely severed communication lines connecting the outpost with friendly firing batteries, Second Lieutenant Skinner, in a determined effort to hold his position, immediately organized and directed the surviving personnel in the defense of the outpost, continuing to call down fire on the enemy by means of radio alone until this equipment became damaged beyond repair. Undaunted by the intense hostile barrage and the rapidly closing attackers, he twice left the protection of his bunker in order to direct accurate machine-gun fire and to replenish the depleted supply of ammunition and grenades. Although painfully wounded on each occasion, he steadfastly refused medical aid until the rest of the men received treatment. As the ground attack reached its climax, he gallantly directed the final defense until the meager supply of ammunition was exhausted and the position overrun. During the three hours that the outpost was occupied by the enemy, several grenades were thrown into the bunker which served as protection for Second Lieutenant Skinner and his remaining comrades. Realizing that there was no chance for other than passive resistance, he directed his men to feign death even though the hostile troops entered the bunker and searched their persons. Later, when an enemy grenade was thrown between him and two other survivors, he immediately threw himself on the deadly missile in an effort to protect the others, absorbing the full force of the explosion and sacrificing his life for his comrades. By his indomitable fighting spirit, superb leadership and great personal valor in the face of tremendous odds, Second Lieutenant Skinner served to inspire his fellow Marines in their heroic stand against the enemy and upheld the highest traditions of the United States Naval Service. He gallantly gave his life for his country.

/S/ Dwight D. Eisenhower

== See also ==
- List of Medal of Honor recipients
- List of Korean War Medal of Honor recipients
