= Keil Farm =

Historic house in South Carolina, United States

- U.S. National Register of Historic Places
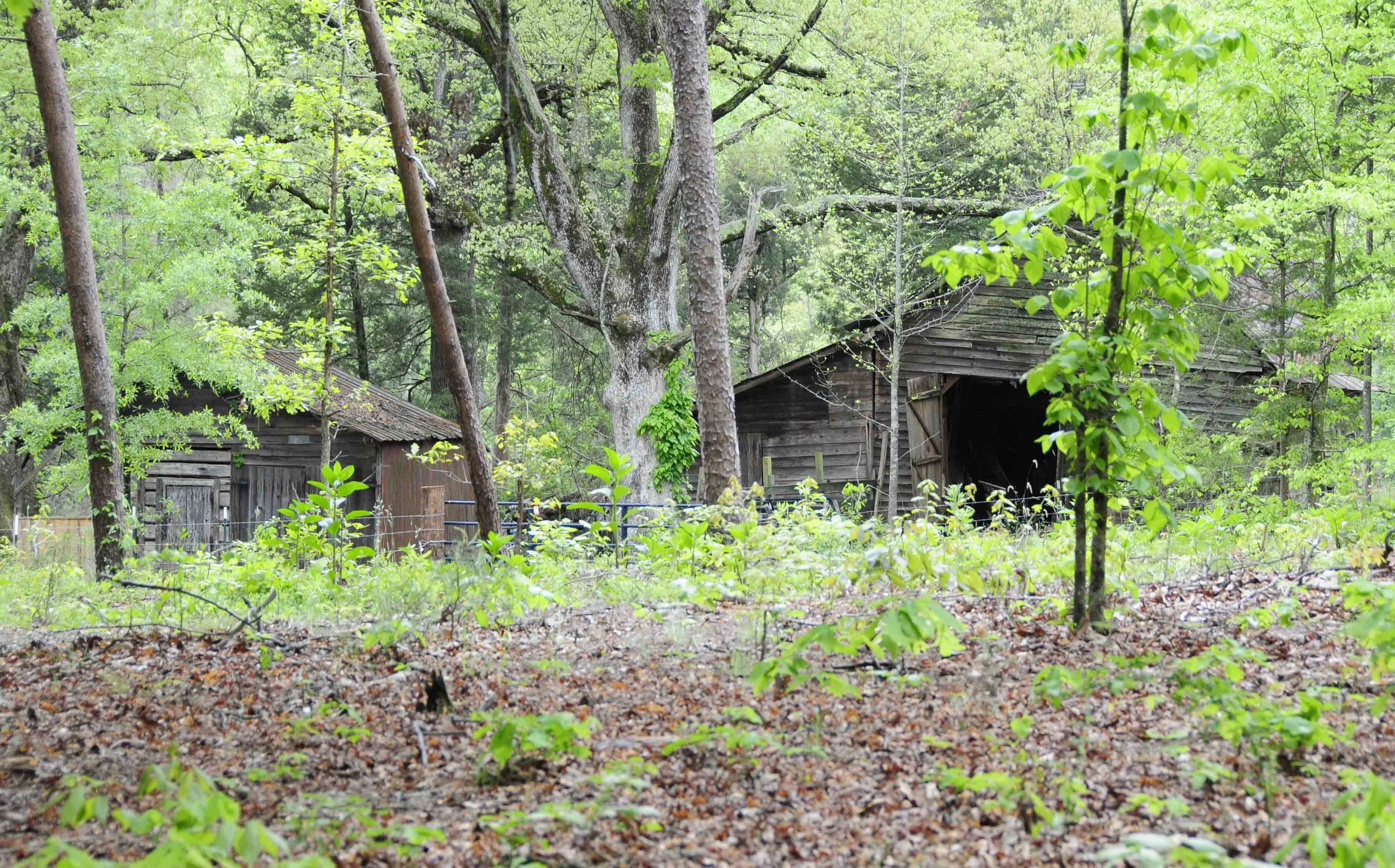
- Outbuildings on the Keil Farm, 2012

- Location within South Carolina Location within the United States
- Nearest city: Walhalla, South Carolina
- Coordinates: 34.731791°N 83.05603°W
- Area: 2.5 acres (1.0 ha)
- Built: 1900
- Architectural style: Mid 19th Century Revival, Late Victorian
- NRHP reference No.: 98000557
- Added to NRHP: May 20, 1998

The Keil Farm is a property listed on the National Register of Historic Places, located near South Carolina Highway 11 in the vicinity of Walhalla, South Carolina, in Oconee County. The property includes a c. 1850 farm house and six contributing outbuildings. The farm, built by John Henry Keil, Sr. (born Johann Heinreich Keil in Stotel, Germany) is seen as an important symbol of the role German immigrant families played in the development of the area.

The farmstead was officially added to the National Register of Historic Places on March 20, 1997, due to its well-preserved mid-19th-century agricultural landscape.

== Outbuildings ==
Structures contributing to the historic nature of the property include a barn, a corn crib, a smoke house, tenant house, a chicken house and an outhouse. Most of the outbuildings were likely constructed before 1860.

== Farmhouse ==
The 1 1/2-story L-shaped frame farmhouse originally had two rooms. Through a number of additions since it was first constructed c. 1850, the house has seven rooms, two halls, a kitchen, two porches, an inset porch, three stoops and three baths. The house sits on a fieldstone foundation, which was constructed without the use of mortar. The exterior walls are made of heart pine overlapping boards. The gabled tin roof is a c. 1900 replacement for the original wooden-shingle roof. Of the 6 exterior doors, 5 are original.

The dining room features heart pine tongue-and-groove boards on the wall and ceiling with wide floor boards. The living room has beaded boards on the walls and ceiling and a fireplace with a hearth and mantel. The kitchen has the original wide floor, wall and ceiling boards. Electricity and plumbing were not added to the home until 1948. The finished loft features walls and ceilings made from unpainted heart pine tongue-and-groove boards and extensive storage space.

The house remained in the family until 1994. After a period of neglect, the house was re-purchased by members of the family in 1996, who undertook a partial restoration of the house.
