= Black Diamond Railroad =

The Black Diamond Railroad was an attempt in the late 1890s by Albert E. Boone to build a railroad from the Ohio River Valley through the Rabun Gap to the Atlantic Coast. It isn't clear if any track was actually laid by this company or if it was just an attempt to restart the Blue Ridge Railroad of South Carolina, which had originally started the route in the 1850s, but was interrupted by the Civil War.
