= First Battle of the Hook =

Battle of the Korean War

Coordinates: 38.029°N 126.842°E

- Part of the Korean War
| Date | 2–28 October 1952 |
| Location | Northeast of Panmunjom, Korea |
| Result | UN victory |

Belligerents
| United Nations: United States | China |

Commanders and leaders
| General Edwin A. Pollock; Lt. Col. Leo J. Dulacki | |

Units involved
| 7th Marine Regiment; 1st Marine Regiment; 11th Marine Regiment | |

Casualties and losses
| USMC: 79 killed 435 wounded 12 MIA; 27 captured | UN estimate 269 casualties |

The First Battle of the Hook was fought between 2 and 28 October 1952 during the Korean War between United Nations Command (UN) and Chinese forces over several frontline outposts.

== Background ==
In March 1952 the US 1st Marine Division was transferred to US I Corps and moved onto the Jamestown Line, the UN's Main line of resistance (MLR) across Korea. The segment of the Jamestown Line assigned to the 1st Marine Division extended southwest from the Samichon River and the left flank of the British 1st Commonwealth Division, crossed the 38th Parallel (the original demarcation between North and South Korea) shifted to the south bank of the Imjin River in the vicinity of Munsan-ni, continued to the conflux of the Imjin and Han River, and then followed the south bank of the Han past the Kimpo Peninsula.

Opposing the Marines on the Jamestown Line, the Chinese People's Volunteer Army (PVA) had the 65th and 63rd Armies, totaling 49,800 troops.

The 7th Marine Regiment took over seven outposts when it relieved the 5th Marine Regiment on the Jamestown Line in early October, renaming them, from left to right, Carson, Reno, Vegas, Berlin, Detroit, Frisco, and Seattle. At the point, later known as the Hook, where the frontline veered southward toward the boundary with the 1st Commonwealth Division, the 7th Marines set up Outpost Warsaw. A second new outpost, Verdun, guarded the boundary between the Marine and Commonwealth divisions. An average of 450 yards (410 m) separated four of these outposts, Detroit, Frisco, Seattle and Warsaw, which occupied hills lower than those on the left of the regimental line and therefore were more easily isolated and attacked.

== Battle ==
=== The loss of Outposts Detroit, Frisco and Seattle (2–7 October) ===
As they did so often, the PVA began with a diversionary thrust at Detroit before artillery and mortar fire preceded the infantry attack on Seattle and Warsaw. A PVA company overwhelmed the reinforced platoon on Warsaw on 2 October, but the Marines fought stubbornly before falling back. Private Jack W. Kelso picked up a grenade thrown into a bunker that he and four other Marines from Company I, 3rd Battalion, 7th Marines, were manning. Kelso threw the live grenade at the advancing PVA, but it exploded immediately after leaving his hand. Although badly wounded, Kelso tried to cover the withdrawal of the other four, firing at the attackers until he suffered fatal wounds. Kelso would earn a posthumous Medal of Honor, but the numerically superior PVA forces captured both Warsaw and Seattle. The Marines counterattacked immediately. Captain John H. Thomas, in command of Company I, sent one platoon against Warsaw, but the PVA had temporarily withdrawn. The lull continued until 01:45 on the morning of 4 October, when a PVA platoon attacked only to be beaten back by the Marines holding Warsaw. Meanwhile, Thomas mounted a counterattack against Seattle early on the morning of 3 October, sending out two squads from the company's position on the main line of resistance. Despite PVA artillery fire, the Marines reached the objective, but Seattle proved too strongly held and Thomas broke off the counterattack. As dusk settled over the battleground, Marine aircraft and artillery put down a smoke screen behind which the counterattack resumed, but the PVA succeeded in containing the two squads short of the crest. To regain momentum, another squad, this one from Company A, 1st Battalion, 7th Marines, which had come under the operational control of the 3rd Battalion, reinforced the other two, but the PVA clinging to Seattle inflicted casualties that sapped the strength of the counterattack. While the Marines regrouped for another assault, the 11th Marine Regiment pounded the outpost with artillery fire. At 22:25 on 3 October, the Marines again stormed the objective, but PVA artillery prevailed, and Seattle remained in PVA hands.

The loss of Outpost Seattle, the recapture of Warsaw, and a successful defense of Frisco against a PVA probe on the night of 5 October did not mark the end of the effort to seize the outposts manned by the 7th Marines, but only a pause. The regiment's casualties, 13 killed and 88 wounded by 3 October when the Marines suspended the attempt to retake Seattle, caused the 7th Marines to shuffle units. The 3rd Battalion had suffered most of the casualties. As a result, while 3rd battalion reduced its frontage, the 1/7 Marines, under Lieutenant colonel Leo J. Dulacki, moved from the regimental reserve to take over the right-hand portion of the Jamestown Line. Dulacki's Marines manned the main line of resistance from roughly 500 yards (460 m) southwest of the Hook to the boundary shared with the Commonwealth Division, including Outposts Warsaw and Verdun. 7Th Marines' commander Colonel Moore thus placed all three battalions on line, 2nd Battalion on the left, 3rd Battalion in the center, and now Dulacki's 1st Battalion on the right. The 7th Marines completed its realignment just in time to meet a series of carefully planned and aggressively executed PVA attacks delivered on 6 and 7 October against five combat outposts and two points on the main line of resistance. The Marines struck first, however, when a reinforced platoon from Company C, 1st Battalion, attacked toward Outpost Seattle at 06:00 on 6 October. Mortar and artillery fire forced the platoon to take cover and regroup, even as the PVA were reinforcing the outpost. The attack resumed at 09:00. Despite infantry reinforcements, air strikes, and artillery, the Marines could not crack Seattle's defenses and broke off the attack at about 11:00 after losing 12 killed and 44 wounded.

On the evening of the 6th, the PVA took the initiative, by midnight firing some 4,400 artillery and mortar rounds against the outpost line and two points on the main line of resistance. On the left of Moore's line, the PVA probed Outposts Carson and Reno, and on the right they stormed Warsaw, forcing the defenders to call for box-me-in fire that severed the telephone wire linking the outpost with the Jamestown Line. The first message from Warsaw when contact was restored requested more artillery fire, which by 20:55 helped break the back of the PVA assault, forcing them to fall back. The most determined attacks on the night of 6 October and early hours of the 7th hit Outposts Detroit and Frisco in the center of the regimental front. To divert attention from these objectives, each one manned by two squads, the PVA probed two points on the main line of resistance that had already been subjected to artillery and mortar bombardment. At 19:40 on the night of the 6th, an attacking company that had gained a foothold in the main trench on Detroit fell back after deadly fire stopped the PVA short of the bunkers. Two hours later, the PVA again seized a segment of trench on Detroit and tried to exploit the lodgment. The Marines reacted by calling on the 11th Marines to box in the outpost. Communications failed for a time, but at about 21:15 the defenders of Detroit requested variable-time fire for airbursts over the bunkers, which would protect the Marines while the PVA outside remained exposed to a hail of shell fragments. The artillerymen fired as the Marines on Detroit asked, but the outpost again lost contact with headquarters of the 3rd Battalion. Two squads set out from the Jamestown Line to reinforce the Marines from Company G, 3/7 Marines, manning Outpost Detroit. The PVA frustrated this attempt with artillery fire but in the meantime again abandoned their foothold on Detroit, probably because of the shower of fragments from Marine shells bursting above them. The respite proved short-lived, however, for the PVA renewed the attack shortly after midnight and extended their control of the hill despite further losses to Marine artillery. A six-man Marine patrol reached the outpost, returning at 03:55 to report that the PVA now held the trenchline and bunkers; only two of the Marines who had manned Detroit escaped death or capture. The attempt to break through to the outpost ended and by 06:30, the Marines engaged in the effort had returned to the main line of resistance. Meanwhile, at about 20:00, a PVA company hit the two squads from Company H that held Outpost Frisco, north of Detroit. The assault troops worked their way into the trenches, but airbursts from Marine artillery reinforced the small arms fire of the defenders in driving the PVA back. The PVA renewed the attack just after midnight, and two Marine squads advanced from the main line of resistance to reinforce Frisco, only to be stopped short of their goal by fire from artillery and mortars. Companies H and I of the 3rd Battalion made further attempts to reach Frisco during the early morning, but not until 05:10 did a reinforced platoon from Company I arrive and take control. During the final attack, Staff Sergeant Lewis G. Watkins, despite earlier wounds, took an automatic rifle from a more badly injured Marine and opened fire to keep the platoon moving forward. When a Chinese grenade landed near him, he seized it, but it exploded before he could throw it away, fatally wounding Watkins, who was posthumously awarded the Medal of Honor. A second platoon from Company I joined the other unit atop the hill and at 07:15 Frisco was declared secure.

To keep Frisco firmly in Marine hands, however, would have invited attrition and ultimately required more men than Division commander General Edwin A. Pollock and Moore could spare from the main line of resistance. Consequently, the 7th Marines abandoned the outpost. The regiment had yielded three outposts, Detroit, Frisco and Seattle, with their losses tallying at 10 killed, 22 missing, and 128 wounded, 105 of them seriously enough to require evacuation.

Since the PVA also wrested Outposts 37, 36 and 86 from the Korean Marine Corps, the 1st Marine Division had lost six combat outposts of varying tactical importance. The lost outposts and those that remained in Marine hands had no value except to the extent their possession affected the security of the Jamestown Line. As a result, the Marines remained wary of mounting major counterattacks; to provide continued protection for the main line of resistance, Pollock would rely on nighttime patrols and listening posts to supplement the remaining outposts and replace the captured ones.

=== Battle of the Hook (24–28 October) ===
The fighting for the outposts that raged early in October died down, although the PVA jabbed from time to time at Bunker Hill and continued their nighttime patrolling elsewhere along the Jamestown Line. During the lull, 5th Marines took over the center of the division's line from the 1st Marine Regiment, which went into reserve, improving the fall-back defense lines, undergoing training, and patrolling to maintain security in the rear areas. As the division reserve, the 1st Marines prepared to counterattack if the PVA should penetrate the main line of resistance. Indeed, the regiment had to be ready to help block a PVA breakthrough anywhere in I Corps, which held the western third of the UN line. With the 1st Marines now in reserve, Moore's 7th Marines manned the right of the division's line placing all three battalions on line and keeping only one company from the 3rd Battalion in reserve. To replace this company, Lieutenant colonel Charles D. Barrett, the 3rd Battalion's new commander, organized a platoon of cooks, drivers, and other members of the headquarters into an improvised platoon that served as his unit's reserve. Barrett's thinly spread 3rd Battalion manned two combat outposts, Berlin and East Berlin, the latter established on 13 October, besides defending the center of the regimental line. To the left of Barrett's unit, 2/7 Marines defended its portion of the regimental line and maintained three combat outposts, Carson, Reno and Vegas. 2/7 Marines held a sector with few vulnerable salients that the aggressive PVA might pinch off and capture. On the far right of the regimental line, Dulacki's 1st Battalion held the dominant terrain feature in the regimental sector, the Hook, where the high ground that defined the Jamestown Line veered sharply to the south. Outposts Seattle and Warsaw had protected the Hook, but only Warsaw remained in Marine hands. To restore the security of the Hook, Dulacki set up a new outpost, Ronson, some 200 yards (180 m) southeast of the PVA-held Seattle and 275 yards (251 m) west of the Hook. Ronson guarded the western approaches to the Hook, while Warsaw commanded the lowlands east of the Hook and a narrow valley leading eastward toward the Samichon River. If the PVA should seize the Hook, disastrous results might follow, for the Hook held the key to controlling the Samichon and Imjin valleys. Its capture could expose the rear areas of the 1st Marine Division and force that unit and the adjacent Commonwealth Division to fall back 2 miles (3.2 km) or more to find defensible terrain from which to protect the northeastern approaches to Seoul. Because of the Hook's importance, Moore set up his headquarters on Hill 146 near the base of the salient.

Opposite the 7th Marines, the PVA had massed two infantry regiments, totaling some 7,000 men, supported by 10 battalions of artillery ranging in size from 75mm to 122mm and later to 152mm. The PVA, moreover, had learned during the fighting at Bunker Hill and along the outpost line to make deadlier use of his artillery, massing fires and, when the Marines counterattacked, imitating the box-me-in fires used by the 11th Marines. In preparation for an attack on the Hook, the PVA massed their artillery batteries within range of the salient, stockpiled ammunition, and dug new trenches that reached like tentacles toward the various elements of the outpost line and afforded cover and concealment for attacking infantry. Against the formidable concentration of PVA troops and guns, Moore's regiment could muster 3,844 Marines, officers and men, supported by 11 Navy medical officers and 133 Hospital Corpsmen, three Army communications specialists, and 746 Korean Service Corps laborers with their 18 interpreters. As in the earlier fighting, the 7th Marines could call upon the 105mm and 155mm howitzers of the 11th Marines, and other Marine supporting weapons including rocket batteries, tanks and aircraft. Army artillery and Air Force fighter-bombers reinforced the firepower of the division. The static battle line placed a premium on artillery, especially the 105mm and 155mm howitzers of the Army and Marine Corps. Indeed, by mid-October 1952 US batteries were firing these shells at a more rapid rate than during the bloody fighting in the early months of 1951, when UN forces advanced beyond the 38th Parallel and conducted offensive operations like Operation Killer and Operation Ripper. By late 1952, firepower, especially artillery, dominated the battleground, as probes, patrols, ambushes and attacks on outposts took the place of major offensives. Because of the demand of artillery support, the rationing of 105mm and 155mm shells became necessary. During the last 11 days of October, a quota prevailed, at least for purposes of planning. In support of the 7th Marines, each 105mm howitzer might fire a daily average of 20 rounds and each 155mm howitzer 4.3 rounds. The 81mm mortars located in each battalion also suffered from a shortage of shells, and even hand grenades were now scarce. To do the work of mortars and artillery, Moore employed tripod-mounted M1917 Browning machine guns. These weapons employed the techniques of World War I, engaging targets like potential assembly areas with indirect fire based on map data and adjusted by forward observers, as well as aimed direct fire.

The PVA initiated the attack on the Hook by battering the salient and its combat outposts with mortar and artillery fire; an estimated 1,200 rounds exploded among the trenches and bunkers on the Hook and Outposts Ronson and Warsaw between dusk on 24 October and dawn on the 25th. The Marine defenders, aided by detachments from the Korean Service Corps, struggled to keep pace with the destruction, repairing damage as best they could during lulls in the bombardment only to face new damage when the shelling resumed. While shoring up trenches and bunkers, the 7th Marines fought back. In the hardest hit area, Dulacki's 1st Battalion returned fire with its own mortars, machine guns, and recoilless rifles, while the regimental mortars and tanks joined in. Despite the shortage of high-explosive shells, the 2nd Battalion, 11th Marines, fired some 400 105mm rounds in response to the first day's PVA bombardment, 575 rounds on the 24 October, and 506 on the 25th, balancing the need to conserve ammunition against the worsening crisis. Air strikes also pounded the PVA massing near the Hook and the two nearby outposts, including attacks by four F9F Panther jets from VMF-311 that dropped high explosives and Napalm on PVA troops massing some 750 yards (690 m) east of the salient. During the 24 hours beginning at 18:00 on the 25th, PVA gunners scourged Moore's regiment with another 1,600 mortar and artillery shells, most of them exploding on the ground held by Dulacki's battalion. The shelling abated briefly on the 25th but resumed, convincing the division's intelligence officer, Colonel Clarence A. Barninger, that the PVA was planning a major attack to overwhelm the Hook and gain control of the Samichon Valley. Barninger warned Pollock, well in advance of the actual attack. The PVA fire diminished somewhat on the morning of 26 October, but the Hook remained a dangerous place. On that morning, Dulacki took advantage of a lull to inspect the defenses, only to be knocked down by the concussion from a PVA shell. He escaped with bruises and abrasions and continued his rounds. The intensity of the bombardment increased later in the morning and continued after dark in preparation for attacks on Outposts Ronson and Warsaw and the Hook itself.

PVA troops stormed Ronson at 18:10 on 26 October after three days of preparatory fire that had collapsed trenches, shattered bunkers, and killed and wounded Marines at both outposts and on the Hook. At Ronson, 50 or more PVA penetrated the defensive artillery concentrations, overran the position and killed or captured the members of the reinforced squad manning the outpost. At about the same time, a PVA company split into two groups and attacked Outpost Warsaw simultaneously from the east and west. A box-me-in barrage fired by the 11th Marines could not prevent the PVA assault troops from closing in on the defenders. The Marines at Warsaw fought back with grenades, pistols and rifles, using the latter as clubs when ammunition ran out. Taking cover in the wreckage of the bunkers, they called for variable-time fire directly overhead. Hope lingered that the rain of shell fragments had saved Warsaw, but after four hours of silence from the garrison, Moore reluctantly concluded that Warsaw was lost, its defenders either dead or captured.

While the fate of Warsaw still remained in doubt and a platoon from Company C was preparing to reinforce the outpost, a flurry of PVA shells battered the Hook. Moore reacted by sending Company A to help Company C defend the salient. Moore also directed that the 1st Battalion have first call on the regiment's supply of ammunition. In addition, the 1st Marine Division lifted the restrictions on artillery ammunition fired in support of the Hook's defenders. Under cover of artillery and mortar fire, a PVA battalion launched a three-pronged attack on Dulacki's 1st Battalion. By 19:38 on the 26th, PVA infantry first threatened the main line of resistance southwest of the Hook itself, to the left of the salient and roughly halfway to the boundary with the 3rd Battalion. Within a few minutes, a second attack hit the nose of the Hook, while a third struck its eastern face. Mingled with the assault troops were laborers carrying construction materials to fortify the Hook after the three prongs of the attack had isolated and overrun it. The thrust along the ridge that formed the spine of the Hook continued until the PVA encountered the observation post from which Second lieutenant Sherrod E. Skinner, Jr., was directing the fire of the 11th Marines. The lieutenant organized the defense of this bunker, running from cover when necessary to replenish the supply of small-arms ammunition. He was still calling down artillery fire when the attackers overran the Hook. He then told his men to play dead until other Marines counterattacked. For three hours, they fooled the PVA who entered the bunker. Finally, a PVA soldier became suspicious and threw a grenade inside. Skinner rolled onto the grenade, absorbing the force of the explosion and saving the lives of two of his men. He would be posthumously awarded the Medal of Honor.

To the left of the Hook, the assault force outflanked a platoon of Company C, but they succeeded in pulling back the flanks to form a perimeter. East of the Hook, on the 1st Battalion's right, other elements of Company C formed another perimeter. In the 400 yards (370 m) separating the two, scattered groups of Marines struggled to close the gap. Help for Company C began arriving at about 23:30, after the PVA had overrun the Hook, when the first elements of Company A, sent to reinforce made contact with Company C's perimeter to the left rear of the captured salient. The arrival of reinforcements enabled the members of Company C, scattered between the two perimeters, to form a blocking position on a ridge running east and west a few hundred yards to the rear of the Hook. At 03:00 on the 27th, Moore committed the regimental reserve, Company H, 3rd Battalion. Pollock ordered the 3rd Battalion, 1st Marines, from the division reserve into the sector held by Moore's 7th Marines. 3/1 Marines, had the mission of counterattacking the PVA who had seized the Hook and penetrated the Jamestown Line. Anticipating commitment in this critical sector, the battalion commander, Lieutenant colonel Sidney J. Altman, had already drawn up a basic plan for such a counterattack and personally reconnoitered the area. Now Altman's Marines prepared to execute that plan. Tank gunners, mortar crews and artillerymen battered the recently captured Outpost Warsaw, other PVA troop concentrations, firing batteries, and supply routes. The 1st Marine Air Wing also joined in, as F7F Tigercat night fighters used the ground-based AN/MPQ-2 radar to hit the main PVA supply route sustaining the attack, dropping their bombs less than 1 mile (1.6 km) west of the Hook.

While the 3/1 Marines prepared to counterattack the Hook, the PVA made a new thrust at the 7th Marines. Early on the morning of 27 October, the PVA attacked Reno, one of the outposts manned by Lieutenant colonel Caputo's 2nd Battalion. Some 2 miles (3.2 km) west of the Hook, the battalion's three outposts at the Nevada Complex formed an arrowhead aimed at PVA lines, with Reno at the point, Carson on the left, and Vegas on the right. The pattern of hostile activity opposite the 7th Marines earlier in October persuaded Pollock's intelligence specialists that the PVA had given first priority to seizing the Nevada Complex. This estimate of PVA intentions caused the 11th Marines to plan concentrations in front of the 2nd Battalion, while Caputo set up strong ambush positions to protect the threatened outposts. On the night before the assault on Reno, a reinforced platoon from Company E set out for a camouflaged ambush position about 300 yards (270 m) south of Reno and halfway between Carson and Vegas. At midnight, noises to the front alerted the patrol that the PVA had infiltrated between them and the outpost and were preparing to attack Reno from the rear. The ambush force alerted the Marines defending the outpost of the danger behind them and opened fire when the force, estimated at two PVA companies, seemed on the verge of attacking. Although raked by fire from the front and rear, the PVA fought back, holding the Marines in check until they could break off the action and make an orderly withdrawal to the main line of resistance. Quiet enveloped Outpost Reno until 04:00 on the 27th, when a PVA platoon attacked from the northwest, assaulting in two waves. The Marines on Reno beat back this first attack, but a second thrust from the same direction broke through the perimeter. The defenders took cover so that variable- time artillery fire bursting overhead could maul the PVA. These tactics forced the PVA to abandon their lodgment after some 40 minutes of fighting.

After the ambush by Marines behind Reno, while the outpost's defenders were fighting off the subsequent PVA assaults, Company A passed through the line established by Byrum's Marines and began advancing toward the Hook. PVA mortar and artillery fire stopped Company A short of the objective, forcing the Marines to dig in and hold the ground they had gained. When that counterattack stalled, Moore attached the last of the regimental reserve, Company H, 3rd Battalion to Dulacki's 1st Battalion. At 05:05 Dulacki ordered Company H to renew the counterattack. Within three hours, Company H stood ready to attack the PVA, whose bridgehead encompassed the Hook itself and a crescent of ridges and draws extending from the spine of that terrain feature and embracing a segment of the main line of resistance about 0.5 miles (0.80 km) wide. Company H rapidly covered the first 200 yards (180 m) before PVA small arms, mortar and artillery fire shifted to meet the threat. The company commander pressed the attack, however. Second Lieutenant George H. O'Brien Jr., led his platoon over the ridge to his front, the men zigzagging as they ran toward the PVA-held trenchline. A bullet struck O’Brien's armored vest, knocking him down, but he scrambled to his feet and continued toward the PVA, pausing only briefly to help a wounded man. Throwing grenades and firing his carbine, he silenced the PVA weapons in a bunker and led his platoon toward the Hook itself. This headlong assault, which earned O’Brien the Medal of Honor, broke through the PVA perimeter and approached the PVA-held bunkers on the Hook before being contained by mortar and artillery fire. The remainder of Company H widened the crack that O’Brien's platoon had opened and captured three prisoners as it overran the southeastern portion of the Hook before fierce shelling forced the advance elements to find cover and yield some of the ground they had taken. Marine aircraft helped Company H advance onto the Hook, attacking reinforcements moving into battle and the positions from which the PVA were firing or adjusting fire. Key targets included the former Marine outposts of Irene, Seattle, and Frisco, along with the frequently bombed main supply route and those PVA troops trying to dislodge the Marines who had gained a foothold on the Hook. Fire from Marine tanks and artillery engaged some of the same targets and proved deadly against trenches and bunkers that the PVA had seized. The howitzers also joined mortars in counterbattery fire.

At midday on 27 October, after Pollock had released Company I, 3/1 Marines, to Moore's control, the counterattack to regain the Hook entered its final phase. Company I would drive the PVA onto the Hook, after which Company H, the unit that had penetrated the Chinese PVA earlier in the day, was to take over the right of the 1st Battalion's line, relieving Company B, which would make a final assault on the Hook and recapture both the Hook and Outpost Warsaw. Company I, launched their attack early in the afternoon. The 1st Platoon, which led the way, seized the crest of the ridge to its front at 13:50 and began advancing toward the Hook behind a barrage laid down by the 11th Marines. The PVA reacted to the threat from I Company with artillery and mortar concentrations directed against not only the advancing Marines, but also Moore's command post and the weapons along the Jamestown Line that supported the assault. Despite severe casualties, I Company pushed ahead, at times crawling from one outcropping in the shell-torn earth to another. After pausing to reorganize at about 16:35, the company moved, a few men at a time, onto the Hook and forging ahead against PVA in collapsed bunkers and trenches. The deadliest fire came, as always, from PVA mortars and artillery shells that plunged steeply onto the Hook before exploding. Company I took such cover as it could find, but terrain afforded concealment and greater protection from flat-trajectory than from high-angle-fire weapons. By midnight on 28 October, Company B had threaded its way through a maze of shell craters and moved into position to the left of Company I. Shortly afterward Company B began what Dulacki had planned as the final assault on the Hook. Small arms fire and a shower of grenades from the PVA positions stopped the Marines as they attacked with rifles and grenades of their own. After exchanging fire with the PVA for perhaps 90 minutes the company fell back to obtain cover and called for mortar and artillery fire. The shelling battered not only the strongpoints immediately to the front of Company B, but also the PVA's supporting weapons and the routes of reinforcement and replenishment that passed through the PVA-held outposts of Warsaw and Ronson. The Marines renewed the assault at 03:40, broke through, and by 06:00 overran the Hook. Afterward, elements of Moore's regiment reoccupied Warsaw and Reno, which the PVA had abandoned.

== Aftermath ==
In preventing the PVA from gaining a permanent tactical advantage at the Hook, the Marines lost 70 killed, 386 wounded and 39 missing, of whom 27 were prisoners of the PVA. At Reno, 9 Marines were killed and 49 wounded. The battle for the Hook and its two outposts, along with the diversionary action at Outpost Reno, cost the PVA 269 dead and wounded.

During the struggle for the Hook, PVA mortars and artillery proved as deadly as usual in both defending against Marine attack and battering Marine defenses. The PVA sent additional soldiers immediately behind the assault troops, intending that they exploit any breakthrough by the earlier waves, but the tactics failed to accomplish the intended purpose. Dulacki believed that the gambit failed because too few junior officers were on hand to commit the reserve at the precise moment to maintain momentum. Dulacki also found flaws with his Marines. Judging from the frequency of malfunctions, they did not appear to be cleaning and caring for their weapons, as they should. Dulacki also expressed concern that the Marines had become too willing to seek the cover of bunkers during PVA attacks, gaining protection from shell fragments, though not from satchel charges or direct hits by large-caliber shells, at a sacrifice in fields of fire. He believed that infantrymen should build and fight from individual positions with at least some overhead cover, rather than from large bunkers in which several defenders might be isolated and attacked with explosive charges or trapped if a direct hit collapsed the structure.

Following the battle, the 29th British Infantry Brigade of the 1st Commonwealth Division took over responsibility for defense of the Hook and the PVA renewed their attacks in the Second Battle of the Hook on 18/19 November 1952.

== See also ==
- Second Battle of the Hook – 1952 battle of the Korean War
- Third Battle of the Hook – 1953 battle of the Korean War
