= West Union, South Carolina =

- Town
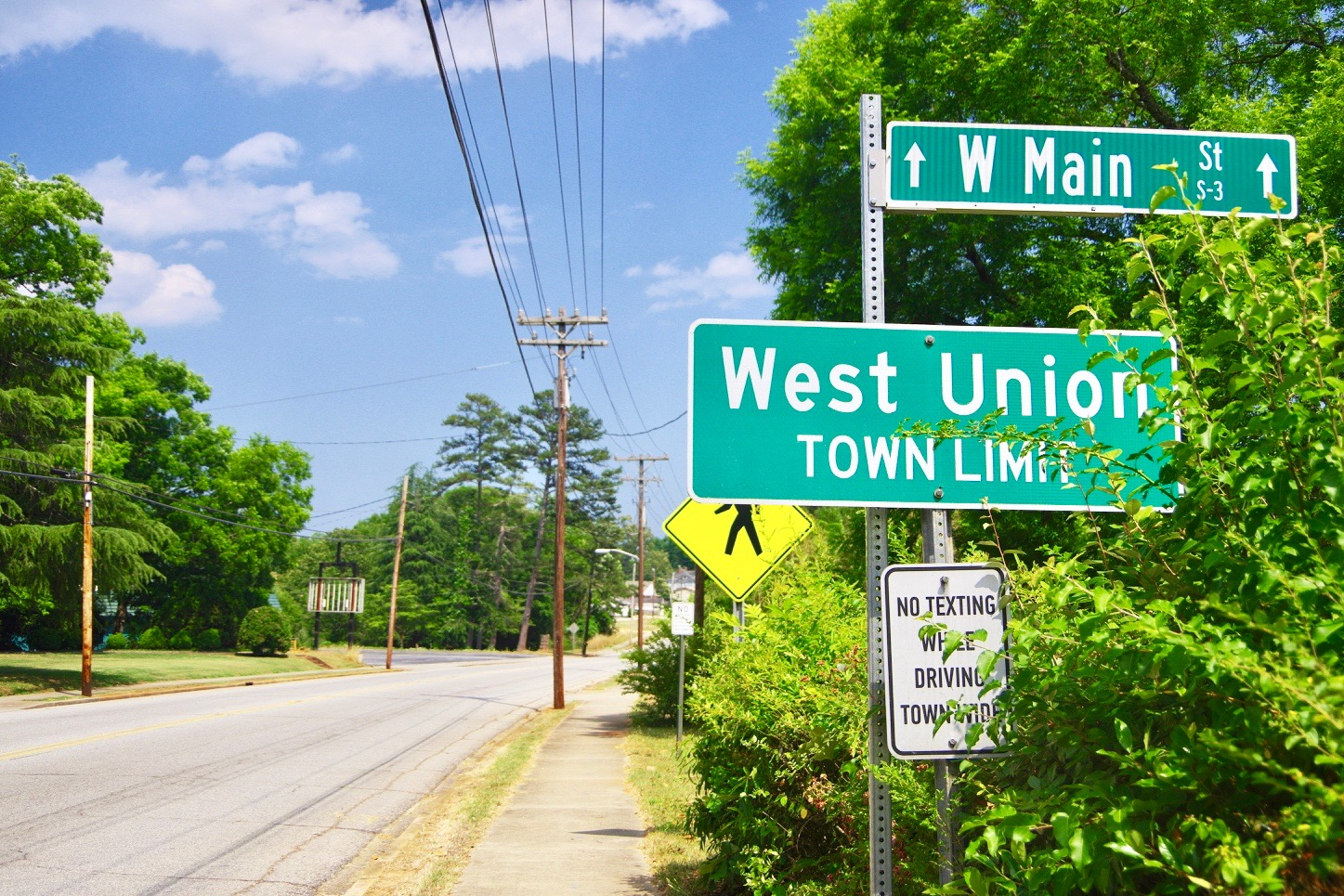
- Entrance along Main Street

- Location in Oconee County and the state of South Carolina.
- Coordinates: 34°45′18″N 83°02′28″W
- Country: United States
- State: South Carolina
- County: Oconee

Area
  - Total: 0.80 sq mi (2.06 km^{2})
  - Land: 0.79 sq mi (2.05 km^{2})
  - Water: 0 sq mi (0.00 km^{2})
- Elevation: 978 ft (298 m)

Population (2020)
  - Total: 374
  - Density: 471.8/sq mi (182.17/km^{2})
- Time zone: UTC-5 (Eastern (EST))
  - Summer (DST): UTC-4 (EDT)
- ZIP code: 29696
- Area codes: 864, 821
- FIPS code: 45-76435
- GNIS feature ID: 2406867
- Website: townofwestunion.com

West Union is a town in Oconee County, South Carolina, United States. As of the 2020 census, West Union's city limits had a population of 374.

== Geography ==
West Union is located along South Carolina Highway 11, mostly northeast of the highway's intersection with South Carolina Highway 28. The city of Walhalla borders the town to the west. Clemson University, a major public research and education center, is 15 miles southeast, and the larger metropolitan area (of about 1 million residents) of the Upstate South Carolina begins in Easley, SC, approximately 15 miles east of Clemson.

West Union sits at the foothills of the Blue Ridge Mountains, surrounded by Lake Keowee, Lake Hartwell, and forested landscapes that provide direct access to extensive outdoor recreation. According to the United States Census Bureau, the town has a total area of 0.8 square mile (2.0 km^{2}), all land.

== History ==
West Union dates to the early 19th century, with settlement documented by the 1830s and incorporation occurring in 1870. Its development was closely tied to nearby Walhalla, established in 1850 from land in the same area and later named the county seat in 1868, linking the towns through early regional growth. Lake Keowee, created in the early 1970s as part of a Duke Energy hydroelectric and nuclear power generation project, has influenced West Union by providing nearby water‑based recreation and strengthening the area’s connection to the broader outdoor and tourism economy of Oconee County. West Union elected Dorothy “Dot” Gibson, their first female mayor, from 2002-2004. She was a long time town council member.

== Demographics ==
Historical population
Census	Pop.	Note	%±
1880	192		—
1890	235		22.4%
1900	289		23.0%
1910	328		13.5%
1920	306		−6.7%
1930	309		1.0%
1940	449		45.3%
1950	429		−4.5%
1960	443		3.3%
1970	388		−12.4%
1980	300		−22.7%
1990	260		−13.3%
2000	297		14.2%
2010	291		−2.0%
2020	374		28.5%
U.S. Decennial Census

As of the census of 2000, there were 297 people, 134 households, and 79 families residing in the town. The population density was 386.2 inhabitants per square mile (149.1/km^{2}). There were 145 housing units at an average density of 188.6 per square mile (72.8/km^{2}). The racial makeup of the town was 87.54% White, 0.67% African American, 3.03% Native American, 7.74% from other races, and 1.01% from two or more races. Hispanic or Latino of any race were 15.82% of the population.

There were 134 households, out of which 21.6% had children under the age of 18 living with them, 49.3% were married couples living together, 6.7% had a female householder with no husband present, and 41.0% were non-families. 38.1% of all households were made up of individuals, and 15.7% had someone living alone who was 65 years of age or older. The average household size was 2.22 and the average family size was 2.95.

In the town, the population was spread out, with 19.5% under the age of 18, 12.8% from 18 to 24, 20.9% from 25 to 44, 30.3% from 45 to 64, and 16.5% who were 65 years of age or older. The median age was 44 years. For every 100 females, there were 104.8 males. For every 100 females age 18 and over, there were 106.0 males.

The median income for a household in the town was $24,250, and the median income for a family was $35,000. Males had a median income of $25,625 versus $21,875 for females. The per capita income for the town was $13,753. About 18.9% of families and 27.1% of the population were below the poverty line, including 43.1% of those under the age of eighteen and 2.9% of those 65 or over.
