= KATCOM =

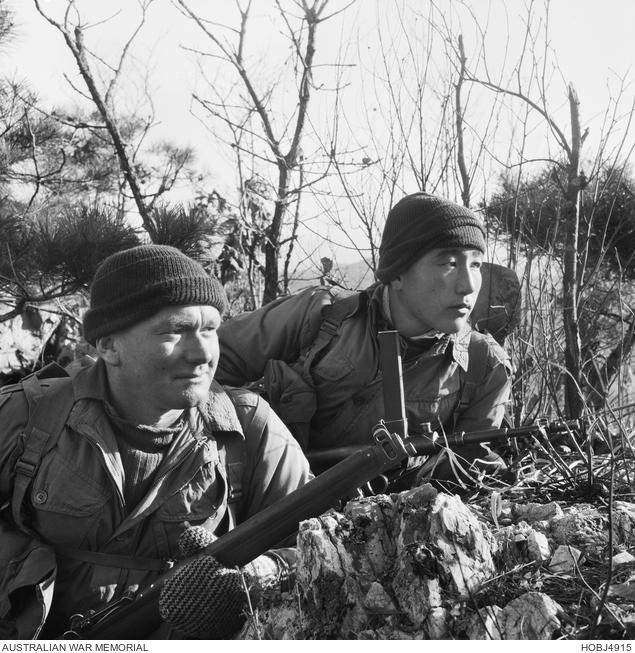
A KATCOM soldier (at right) with a member of the 3rd Battalion, Royal Australian Regiment during exercises in March 1954.

Korean Augmentation Troops to Commonwealth Division (KATCOM) refers to significant numbers of South Korean soldiers who were attached to the 1st Commonwealth Division during the Korean War. South Korean troops were included within Commonwealth units as replacements simply to make up numbers during periods of troop rotation.

The KATCOM system, also known as Korean Attached Commonwealth Division or Korean Augmentation to Commonwealth Division, took effect from May 1952. Soldiers assigned as KATCOMs were given 16 weeks' standard basic training at the ROK Replacement Training Center with further specialist training on British and Canadian weaponry. On average, each British battalion received 94 South Korean soldiers, making a total of 1,000 South Koreans across the whole Commonwealth division. More broadly, KATCOM can also refer to South Korean troops serving in other United Nations contingents, notably the Belgian and Dutch contingents.

== See also ==
- KATUSA
- 1st Commonwealth Division
