= Walhalla, South Carolina =

Walhalla
- City
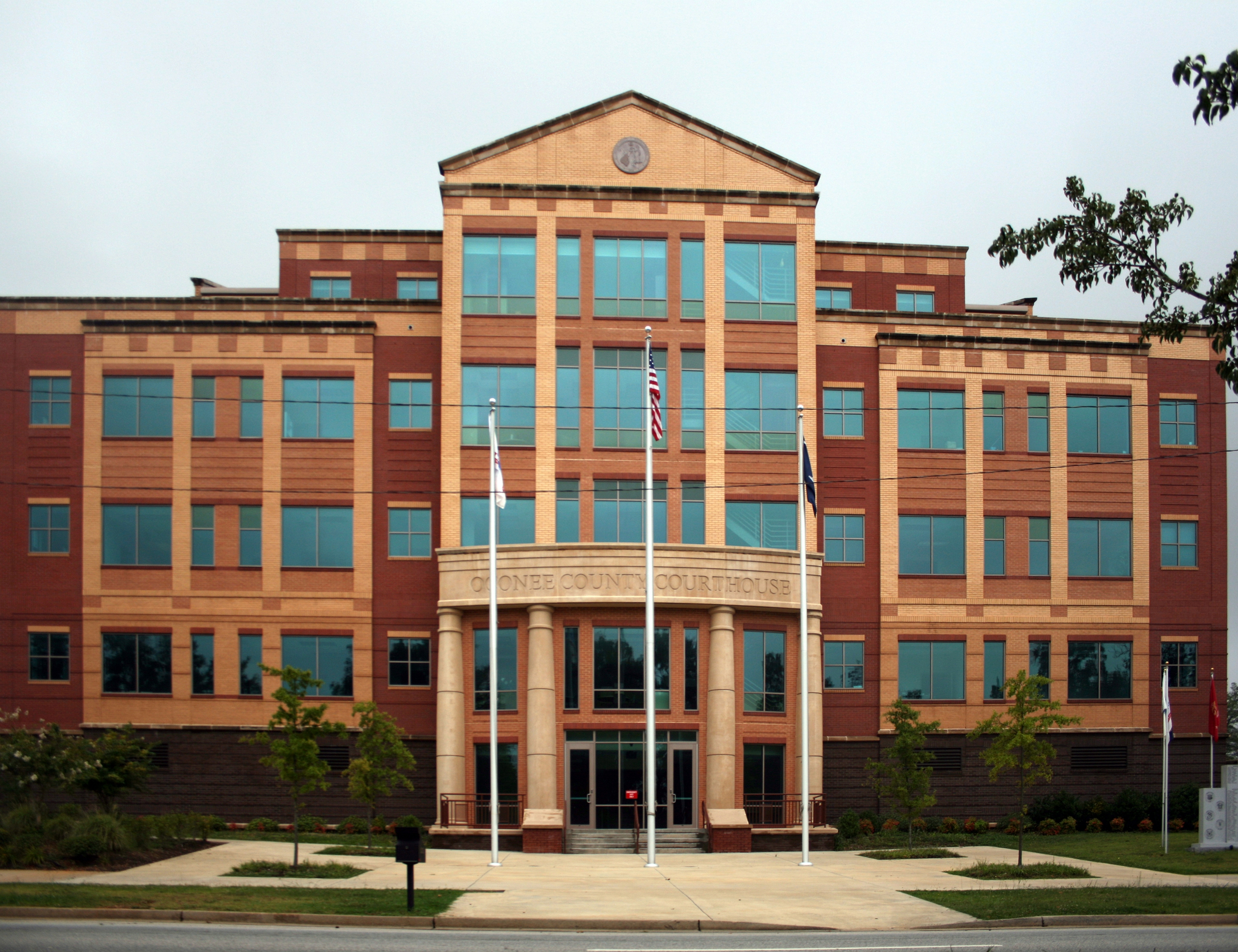
- Oconee County Courthouse

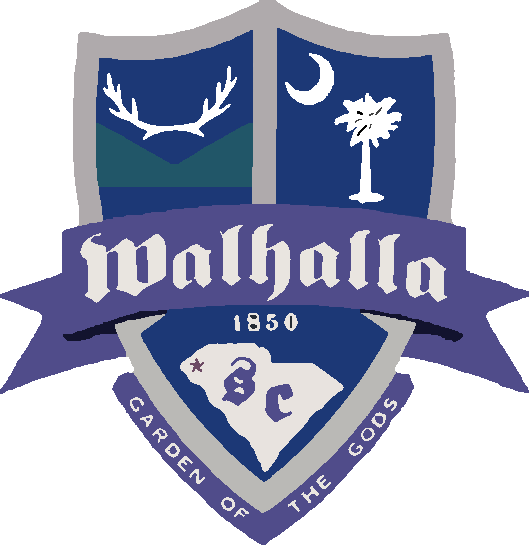
- Seal Coat of arms

- Location in Oconee County and the state of South Carolina.
- Coordinates: 34°45′25″N 83°03′23″W
- Country: United States
- State: South Carolina
- County: Oconee
- First settled: 1850
- Named for: Valhalla

Area
  - Total: 3.95 sq mi (10.22 km^{2})
  - Land: 3.88 sq mi (10.06 km^{2})
  - Water: 0.062 sq mi (0.16 km^{2})
- Elevation: 1,017 ft (310 m)

Population (2020)
  - Total: 4,072
  - Density: 1,048.1/sq mi (404.68/km^{2})
- Time zone: UTC−5 (Eastern (EST))
  - Summer (DST): UTC−4 (EDT)
- ZIP code: 29691
- FIPS code: 45-74095
- GNIS feature ID: 2405663
- Website: cityofwalhalla.com

Walhalla is a city in the foothills of the Blue Ridge Mountains in Oconee County, South Carolina, United States. Designated in 1868 as the county seat, it lies within the area of the Blue Ridge Escarpment, an area of transition between mountains and piedmont, and contains numerous waterfalls. It is located 16 miles (26 km) from Clemson University in Clemson, South Carolina.

This European-American city was founded in 1850, long after the Indian Removal of the Cherokee in 1838. Early residents were predominantly German immigrants who had been refugees from the German revolutions of 1848-1849. Some English and Scotch-Irish farmers also settled here. During the Reconstruction era, when Oconee County was organized in 1868, the state legislature designated Walhalla as its county seat.

While its population was 4,072 as of the 2020 census, "Walhalla" is used both colloquially and practically to refer to a larger area than is within city limits, often being expanded to the whole 29691 zip code. This larger area has a higher, more spread-out population.

== History ==
The German Colonization Society of Charleston was founded in 1848 to aid a wave of immigrants from the failures of the German revolutions of 1848-1849 and settle them in The Upstate; in the aftermath, numerous liberal merchants and farmers immigrated to the United States. Society trustees including General John A. Wagener, Claus Bullwinkel, John C. Henckel, Jacob Schroder, and Christopher F. Seeba bought 17,859 acres (72.27 km^{2}) of land for $27,000 from Reverend Joseph Grisham of West Union in the Pickens District on December 24, 1849, to support German settlement in this area.

As mostly political refugees, the German colonists named their settlement Valhalla, in reference to the afterlife in Norse Mythology where warriors would go if selected to fight during Ragnarök. The Germans had sailed from the port of Hamburg, Germany to Charleston. Many were from Bavaria, and the ship also carried some English and Scots-Irish immigrants.

When Oconee County was organized in 1868, Walhalla was selected as the county seat. After this the predominant German population was diluted and became outnumbered by an influx of new settlers, mostly former British settlers from surrounding counties such as Pickens and Anderson.

Ellicott Rock, Keil Farm, Oconee County Cage, Oconee Station and Richards House, St. John's Lutheran Church, Stumphouse Tunnel Complex, and Walhalla Graded School are natural formations and structures in Walhalla that have been listed on the National Register of Historic Places.

In 1988, Walhalla elected their first (and only) female mayor, Gladys Pepper.

== Geography ==
The city developed in the northwestern part of the state near the Georgia and North Carolina borders. South Carolina Highway 28 and South Carolina Highway 183 intersect here. The small town of West Union borders Walhalla to the east.

According to the United States Census Bureau, the city has a total area of 3.8 square miles (9.8 km^{2}), of which 3.7 square miles (9.6 km^{2}) is land and 0.1 square miles (0.26 km^{2}) (1.33%) is water.

The town is built mostly upon granite rock. Near some minor faults, it has been subject to small and infrequent earthquakes. The last nearby earthquake had its epicenter in Newry, South Carolina, and occurred at 7:42 am EDT on May 19, 1971. The earthquake had an intensity of VI (strong) in Newry as measured by the Mercalli intensity scale. The cause of the Newry quake was likely a slippage of the Brevard Fault and other faults in the area, aided by the immense weight of the man-made Lake Keowee, created by the Keowee Dam.

The Stumphouse Mountain Tunnel is located near Walhalla.

=== Climate ===
Climate data for Walhalla, South Carolina (1991–2020 normals, extremes 1896–present)
Month	Jan	Feb	Mar	Apr	May	Jun	Jul	Aug	Sep	Oct	Nov	Dec	Year
Record high °F (°C)	81 (27)	82 (28)	94 (34)	94 (34)	101 (38)	105 (41)	106 (41)	106 (41)	108 (42)	98 (37)	87 (31)	81 (27)	108 (42)
Mean daily maximum °F (°C)	51.7 (10.9)	55.7 (13.2)	63.1 (17.3)	72.2 (22.3)	78.9 (26.1)	85.4 (29.7)	88.5 (31.4)	87.3 (30.7)	81.8 (27.7)	71.7 (22.1)	62.0 (16.7)	53.9 (12.2)	71.0 (21.7)
Daily mean °F (°C)	40.5 (4.7)	43.3 (6.3)	50.1 (10.1)	58.4 (14.7)	66.7 (19.3)	74.2 (23.4)	77.5 (25.3)	76.6 (24.8)	71.0 (21.7)	59.8 (15.4)	49.4 (9.7)	42.9 (6.1)	59.2 (15.1)
Mean daily minimum °F (°C)	29.2 (−1.6)	30.9 (−0.6)	37.1 (2.8)	44.7 (7.1)	54.5 (12.5)	63.1 (17.3)	66.5 (19.2)	66.0 (18.9)	60.1 (15.6)	47.8 (8.8)	36.8 (2.7)	31.8 (−0.1)	47.4 (8.6)
Record low °F (°C)	−5 (−21)	−4 (−20)	3 (−16)	20 (−7)	28 (−2)	39 (4)	49 (9)	49 (9)	32 (0)	20 (−7)	9 (−13)	−3 (−19)	−5 (−21)
Average precipitation inches (mm)	5.43 (138)	4.78 (121)	5.17 (131)	4.75 (121)	4.79 (122)	5.25 (133)	4.93 (125)	6.17 (157)	4.89 (124)	4.60 (117)	4.54 (115)	5.80 (147)	61.10 (1,552)
Average snowfall inches (cm)	0.8 (2.0)	0.7 (1.8)	0.2 (0.51)	0.0 (0.0)	0.0 (0.0)	0.0 (0.0)	0.0 (0.0)	0.0 (0.0)	0.0 (0.0)	0.0 (0.0)	0.0 (0.0)	0.5 (1.3)	2.2 (5.6)
Average precipitation days (≥ 0.01 in)	10.1	9.6	10.7	9.6	10.5	11.6	12.0	12.3	8.9	7.8	8.6	10.5	122.2
Average snowy days (≥ 0.1 in)	0.5	0.3	0.2	0.0	0.0	0.0	0.0	0.0	0.0	0.0	0.0	0.4	1.4
Source: NOAA

== Demographics ==
Historical population
Census	Pop.	Note	%±
1870	716		—
1880	789		10.2%
1890	820		3.9%
1900	1,307		59.4%
1910	1,595		22.0%
1920	2,068		29.7%
1930	2,388		15.5%
1940	2,820		18.1%
1950	3,104		10.1%
1960	3,431		10.5%
1970	3,662		6.7%
1980	3,977		8.6%
1990	3,755		−5.6%
2000	3,801		1.2%
2010	4,263		12.2%
2020	4,072		−4.5%
U.S. Decennial Census

=== 2020 census ===
As of the 2020 census, Walhalla had a population of 4,072, and 1,202 families resided in the city. The median age was 36.9 years, 24.8% of residents were under the age of 18, and 17.0% of residents were 65 years of age or older. For every 100 females there were 93.4 males, and for every 100 females age 18 and over there were 87.3 males age 18 and over.

There were 1,604 households in Walhalla, of which 33.4% had children under the age of 18 living in them. Of all households, 35.8% were married-couple households, 17.1% were households with a male householder and no spouse or partner present, and 40.8% were households with a female householder and no spouse or partner present. About 33.1% of all households were made up of individuals and 16.4% had someone living alone who was 65 years of age or older.

There were 1,797 housing units, of which 10.7% were vacant. The homeowner vacancy rate was 1.3% and the rental vacancy rate was 7.2%.

97.6% of residents lived in urban areas, while 2.4% lived in rural areas.

Racial composition as of the 2020 census
Race	Number	Percent
White	2,874	70.6%
Black or African American	172	4.2%
American Indian and Alaska Native	30	0.7%
Asian	19	0.5%
Native Hawaiian and Other Pacific Islander	4	0.1%
Some other race	595	14.6%
Two or more races	378	9.3%
Hispanic or Latino (of any race)	1,038	25.5%

=== 2000 census ===
As of the census of 2000, there were 3,801 people, 1,558 households, and 1,028 families residing in the city. The population density was 1,023.8 inhabitants per square mile (395.3/km^{2}). There were 1,705 housing units at an average density of 459.2 per square mile (177.3/km^{2}). The racial makeup of the city was 83.19% White, 15.35% Hispanic (of any race), 6.92% African American, 0.32% Native American, 0.32% Asian, 0.18% Pacific Islander, 1.42% from two or more races, and 7.66% other races.

There were 1,558 households, out of which 30.9% had children under the age of 18 living with them, 45.2% were married couples living together, 16.7% had a female householder with no husband present, and 34.0% were non-families. 30.9% of all households were made up of individuals, and 15.6% had someone living alone who was 65 years of age or older. The average household size was 2.40 and the average family size was 2.98.

In the city, the population was spread out, with 25.7% under the age of 18, 8.3% from 18 to 24, 27.7% from 25 to 44, 22.5% from 45 to 64, and 15.7% who were 65 years of age or older. The median age was 36 years. For every 100 females, there were 91.6 males. For every 100 females age 18 and over, there were 82.8 males.

The median income for a household in the city was $29,063, and the median income for a family was $34,184. Males had a median income of $28,445 versus $21,106 for females. The per capita income for the city was $15,691. About 14.1% of families and 17.2% of the population were below the poverty line, including 21.2% of those under age 18 and 15.0% of those age 65 or over.

== Education ==
Walhalla has a lending library, a branch of the Oconee County Public Library. It is also home to Walhalla Middle School and James M. Brown Elementary School. Outside of city limits, there is also Walhalla High School and Walhalla Elementary School.

== Arts and culture ==
Due to its German heritage, Walhalla established an annual Oktoberfest celebration. It begins on the third Friday of October each year. The festival takes place on the city's Sertoma Field, located between the middle school and downtown (Hwy 183). The festival includes art and craft vendors, music, dancing, specialty food vendors, carnival rides, and other festive activities. Walhalla also hosts a Merchant Market every year, taking place shortly after the end of the Oktoberfest; it consists of many businesses selling food and gifts on Main Street.

== Notable people ==
- Thomas C. Alexander, president of the South Carolina State Senate
- Dutch Mantell, professional wrestler
- John C. Portman Jr., architect
- Reuben Shannon Lovinggood (1864–1916), educator, college president
- Cornelia Strong, mathematician and astronomer
