= National Register of Historic Places listings in Oconee County, South Carolina =

Location of Oconee County in South Carolina

This is a list of the National Register of Historic Places listings in Oconee County, South Carolina.

This is intended to be a complete list of the properties and districts on the National Register of Historic Places in Oconee County, South Carolina, United States. The locations of National Register properties and districts for which the latitude and longitude coordinates are included below, may be seen on a map.

There are 24 properties and districts listed on the National Register in the county. Another 2 properties were once listed but have been removed.

This National Park Service list is complete through NPS recent listings posted May 1, 2026.

== Current listings ==
	Name on the Register	Image	Date listed	Location	City or town	Description
1	Alexander-Hill House	Alexander-Hill House	July 24, 1972 (#72001216)	About 10 miles (16 km) north of Seneca off South Carolina Highway 183; 34°47′48″N 82°55′49″W	Seneca	
2	Ellicott Rock	Ellicott Rock	July 24, 1973 (#73001722)	North of Walhalla off SC 107; 35°00′02″N 83°06′30″W	Walhalla	
3	Faith Cabin Library at Seneca Junior College	Faith Cabin Library at Seneca Junior College	November 14, 2012 (#12000942)	298 S. Poplar St. 34°40′51″N 82°57′35″W	Seneca	Part of the Faith Cabin Libraries in South Carolina 1932-ca.1960 MPS
4	Keil Farm	Keil Farm	May 20, 1998 (#98000557)	178 Keil Farm Rd. 34°43′54″N 83°03′23″W	Walhalla	
5	Long Creek Academy	Long Creek Academy	November 20, 1987 (#87002059)	1251 Academy Rd. 34°47′25″N 83°14′52″W	Long Creek	
6	McPhail Angus Farm	McPhail Angus Farm	November 7, 2007 (#07000396)	320 Coyote Lane; 34°33′18″N 82°56′24″W	Seneca	
7	Newry Historic District	Newry Historic District	March 19, 1982 (#82003897)	Broadway, River Ridge Rd., and South, Branch, and Palmetto Aves. 34°43′28″N 82°54′32″W	Newry	
8	Oconee County Cage	Oconee County Cage	November 14, 1982 (#82001523)	Church St. 34°45′52″N 83°04′01″W	Walhalla	Moved to Oconee Heritage Center
9	Oconee County Courthouse	Oconee County Courthouse	October 11, 2016 (#16000715)	211 W. Main St. 34°45′55″N 83°04′07″W	Walhalla	The old 1956 courthouse
10	Oconee State Park Historic District	Oconee State Park Historic District	June 16, 2004 (#04000618)	624 State Park Rd. 34°51′57″N 83°06′12″W	Mountain Rest	
11	Oconee Station and Richards House	Oconee Station and Richards House	February 24, 1971 (#71000792)	11 miles (18 km) north of Walhalla via South Carolina Highway 11 and County Road 95; 34°50′46″N 83°04′14″W	Walhalla	
12	Old Pickens Presbyterian Church	Old Pickens Presbyterian Church	April 4, 1996 (#96000380)	South Carolina Highway 183, 0.25 miles (0.40 km) west of the Oconee-Pickens county line 34°47′29″N 82°53′12″W	Seneca	
13	Pendleton Historic District	Pendleton Historic District	August 25, 1970 (#70000560)	Bounded on the west by Hopewell and Treaty Oak, on the north by the Old Stone Church, on the east by Montpelier, and on the south by the town limits 34°39′07″N 82°47′01″W	Pendleton	Extends into Anderson and Pickens counties
14	Ram Cat Alley Historic District	Ram Cat Alley Historic District	March 24, 2000 (#00000289)	Ram Cat Alley and North Townville St. 34°41′06″N 82°57′09″W	Seneca	
15	Retreat Rosenwald School	Retreat Rosenwald School	September 15, 2011 (#11000676)	150 Pleasant Hill Cir. 34°38′28″N 83°03′50″W	Westminster	
16	Russell House	Russell House	February 29, 1988 (#83004549)	Northwest of Mountain Rest on South Carolina Highway 28; 34°54′34″N 83°10′21″W	Mountain Rest	
17	St. John's Lutheran Church	St. John's Lutheran Church	November 24, 1980 (#80003692)	301 W. Main St. 34°45′54″N 83°04′11″W	Walhalla	
18	Seneca Cotton Mill	Seneca Cotton Mill	January 13, 2022 (#100007304)	1300 East South 6th St. 34°40′49″N 82°55′58″W	Seneca	
19	Seneca Historic District	Seneca Historic District	December 31, 1974 (#74001871)	Roughly bounded by S. 1st, S. 3rd, Townsville, and Poplar Sts.; also 300 S. Fairplay St. 34°41′01″N 82°57′25″W	Seneca	300 S. Fairplay represents a boundary increase of April 23, 1987
20	Southern Railway Passenger Station	Southern Railway Passenger Station	November 7, 1976 (#76001707)	129 Main St. 34°39′57″N 83°05′46″W	Westminster	
21	Stumphouse Tunnel Complex	Stumphouse Tunnel Complex	April 7, 1971 (#71000793)	5 miles (8.0 km) north of Walhalla via South Carolina Highways 28 and 226; 34°48′43″N 83°07′03″W	Walhalla	
22	Tamassee DAR School	Tamassee DAR School	May 16, 2012 (#12000289)	1925 Bumgardner Dr. 34°53′01″N 83°01′04″W	Tamassee	
23	Walhalla Graded School	Walhalla Graded School	February 13, 1992 (#92000059)	101 E. N. Broad St. 34°46′00″N 83°03′55″W	Walhalla	Walhalla Civic Auditorium
24	Walhalla High School		October 20, 2023 (#100008937)	201 North College St. 34°46′01″N 83°03′55″W	Walhalla	

== Former listings ==
	Name on the Register	Image	Date listed	Date removed	Location	City or town	Description
1	Oconee County Jail		November 14, 1982 (#82001524)	December 12, 1989	Short St.	Walhalla	Demolished in 1985.
2	Prather's Bridge	Prather's Bridge	June 5, 1970 (#70000891)	April 17, 1978	SW of Westminster; 34°38′50″N 83°16′46″W	Westminster vicinity	Destroyed by arsonist on April 8, 1978.

== See also ==
- List of National Historic Landmarks in South Carolina
- National Register of Historic Places listings in South Carolina
