= Chrissy Adams =

American politician (1967–2016)

South Carolina Tenth Judicial Circuit Solicitor
- In office January 21, 2005 – December 27, 2016

Personal details
- Born: November 10, 1967 Charleston, South Carolina, U.S.
- Died: December 27, 2016 (aged 49)
- Party: Republican
- Spouse: Eddie Adams
- Children: 2
- Education: Clemson University; South Carolina School of Law
- Known for: Investigation of the killing of Zachary Hammond

Christina Theos "Chrissy" Adams (November 10, 1967 – December 27, 2016) was the tenth judicial circuit solicitor in South Carolina, a position that she served in from 2005 to 2016.

== Early life ==
Born in Charleston, South Carolina, Adams graduated from Bishop England High School in 1985.

== Career ==
In 1989, Adams earned a BS in Management from Clemson University and a law degree from the South Carolina School of Law in 1994. Before assuming the office of solicitor, Adams served as an assistant prosecutor in Charleston, South Carolina, and deputy solicitor for Oconee County. She was elected solicitor for the tenth judicial circuit in 2004.

Adams gained media attention following the July 26, 2015 shooting of Zachary Hammond in Seneca. Hammond's family asked that she be removed from the case due to an alleged conflict of interest. Following an investigation by South Carolina Law Enforcement Division (SLED), Adams declined to release the dashcam video of the shooting and released text messages between the victim and his girlfriend involving a drug deal.

== Personal life ==
Adams was married to Eddie Adams. The couple had two sons. She died on December 27, 2016, at the age of 49.
