= Seneca Institute – Seneca Junior College =

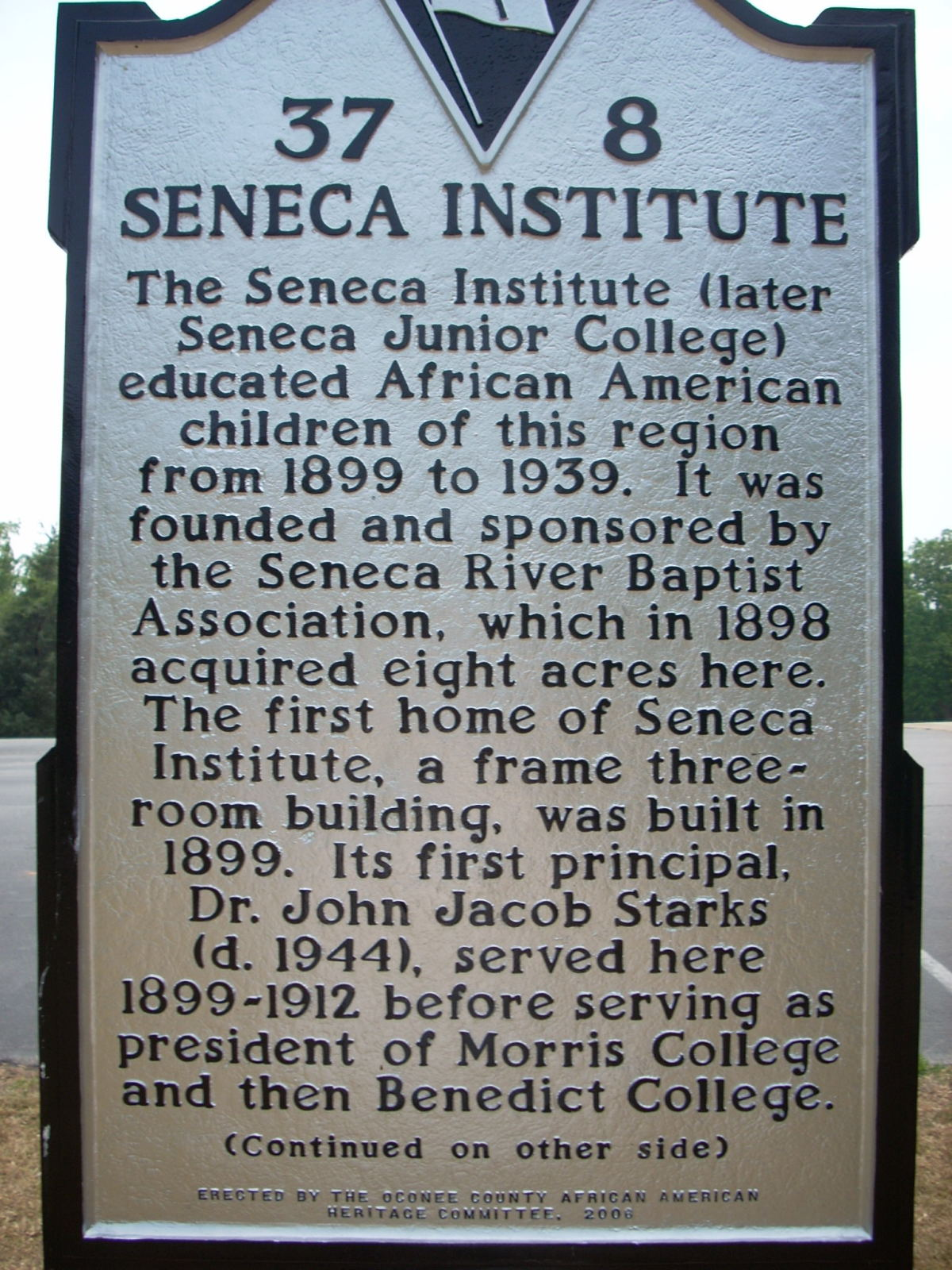
Seneca Institute - historical marker

The Seneca Institute – Seneca Junior College was an African-American school in Seneca, South Carolina, from 1899 to 1939. This was in a period of segregated public schools in South Carolina.

== History ==
The Seneca Institute was a Christian, primary and secondary school for African Americans that was founded in 1899 by the Seneca River Baptist Association. It occupied about 8 acres (3.2 ha) in Seneca, South Carolina. The site is bounded by West South Third and South Poplar Streets and Scotland Road. It was founded to promote education for African-American children at a time in which there was no secondary school for African Americans in Oconee County.

The first president of the Seneca Institute was Rev. Dr. John J. Starks. He was born in what is now rural Greenwood County. He served the Seneca Institute for thirteen years. He left to become the president of Morris College in Sumter, South Carolina. After serving as its president from 1912 to 1930, he became the president of Benedict College in Columbia, South Carolina. He served as its president until his death.

With the addition of two years of college instruction in 1926, the Seneca Institute was renamed the Seneca Junior College. In addition to the primary and secondary classes, it served as a junior college and teaching training course.

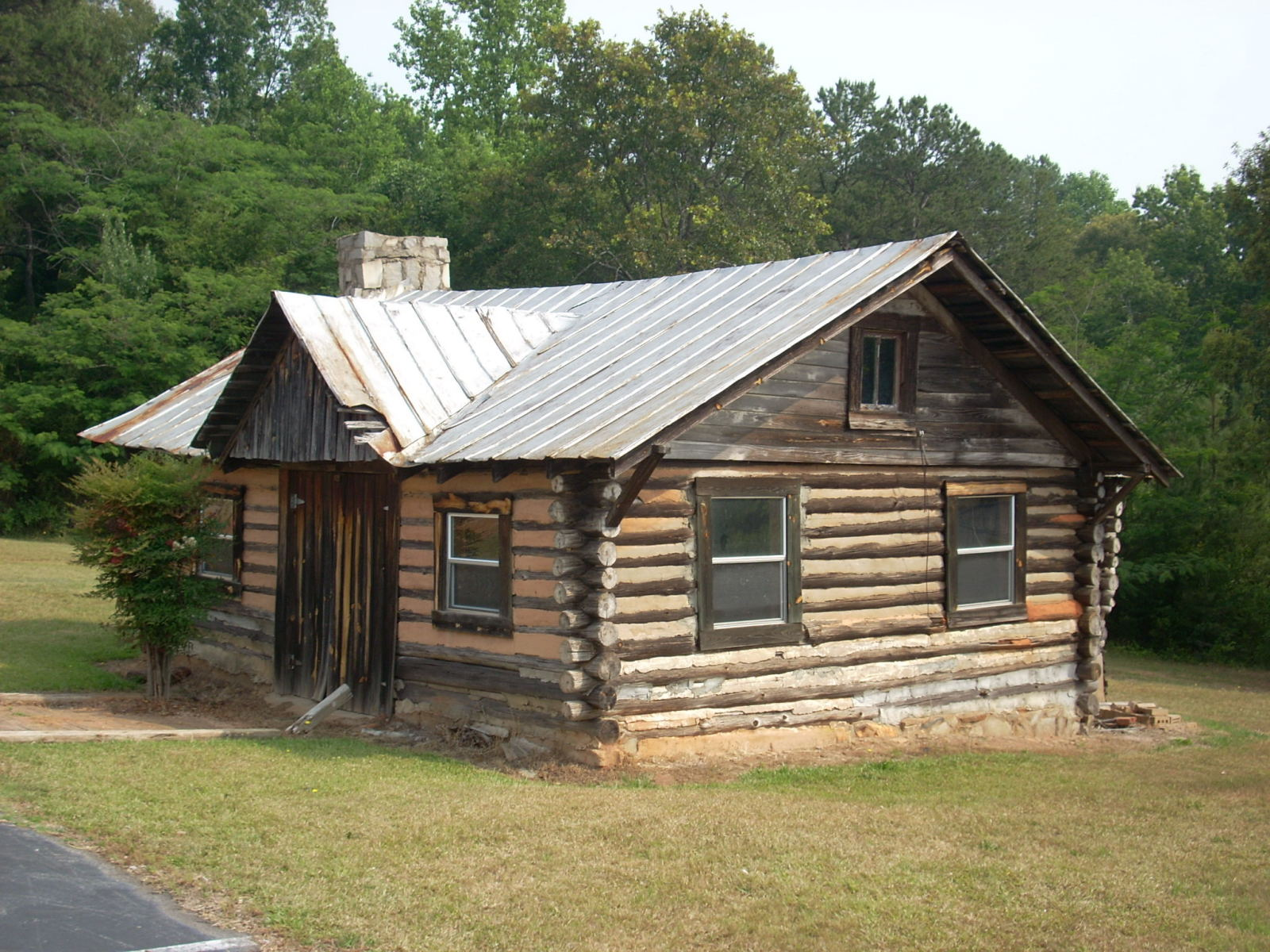
Faith Cabin Library at Seneca Junior College

In 1937 a Faith Cabin Library was built on campus with books donated by students at Oberlin College.

The school struggled during the Great Depression. It was closed in 1939.

The Seneca Institute had students who lived in the community and boarders. It had a brick dormitory for girls, the B.S. Sharp Dormitory for boys, the A.P. Dunbar Hall for classes, and a library. Except for the log cabin library that is still standing, the buildings were razed in 1963.

== Other African-American schools ==
During the period of segregated education, there were other private and public schools in Oconee County. The Norrel School was found by Northern Presbyterians. It began as a church and school on Fairplay Street in front of Mt. View Cemetery. The school closed prior to 1939.

The Oconee County Training School, which was a teaching training school for African Americans, was a public institution founded in 1925. Its programs included home economics, industrial arts, and agriculture. In 1955, its building was used for East End Elementary School.

Blue Ridge High School was built in 1955 to serve the African-American community. It continued as the African-American high school in the Seneca area until 1969 when the county public schools were integrated. The building was renamed Seneca Junior High School and later Code Elementary School.

== Legacy ==
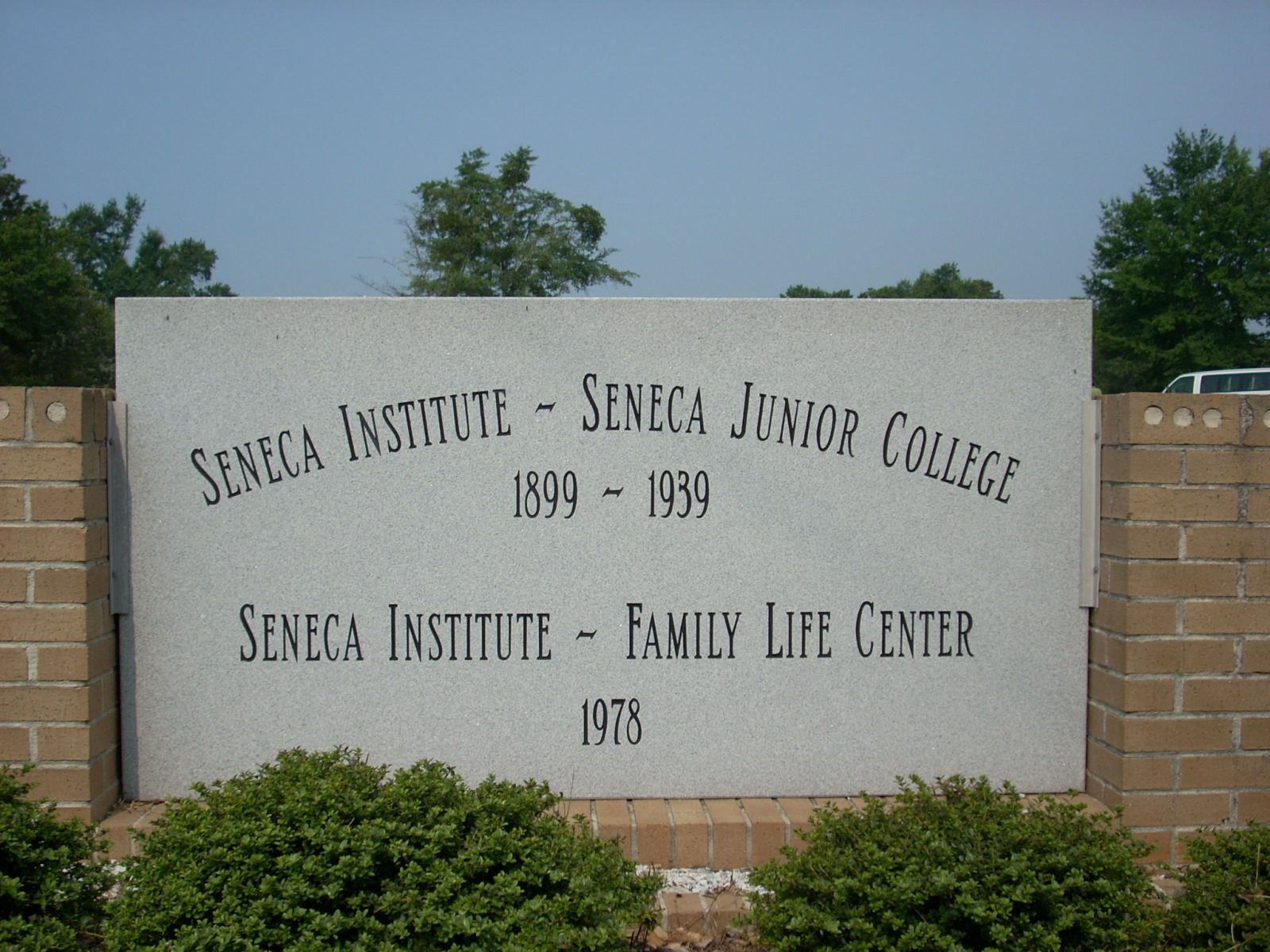
Seneca Institute - Family Life Center

The Seneca Institute – Seneca Junior College educated many African Americans that continued to live in the Seneca area as well as the nation. This included many physicians, dentists, clergymen, and educators.

In 1978, the Seneca River Improvement Association dedicated the Seneca Institute Family Life Center, a multi-purpose building, as a community center. It is located on the old campus of the Seneca Institute – Seneca Junior College.
