= Seneca Historic District (Seneca, South Carolina) =

Historic district in South Carolina, United States

- U.S. National Register of Historic Places
- U.S. Historic district
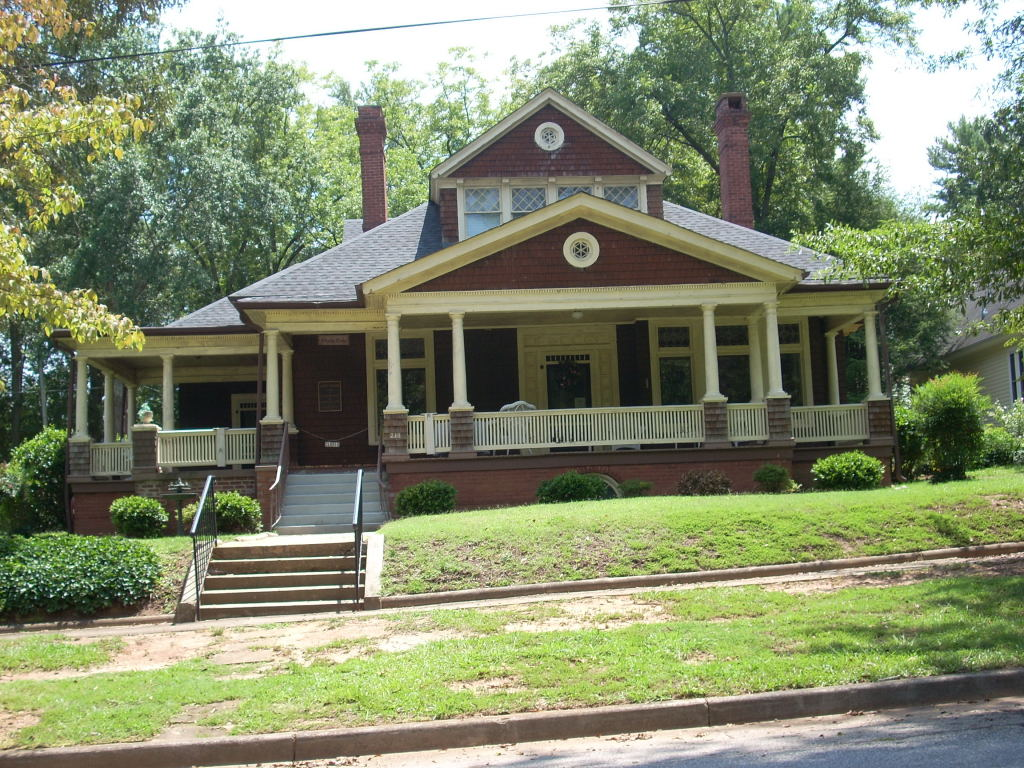
- Lunney Museum, August 2009

- Location within South Carolina Location within the United States
- Location: Roughly bounded by S. First, S. Third, Townsville, and Poplar Sts. (original) and 300 S. Fairplay St. (increase); Seneca, South Carolina; United States
- Coordinates: 34°41′1″N 82°57′25″W
- Built: 1873 (original) and 1909 (increase)
- Architectural style: Bungalow/Craftsman, Late Victorian (original)
- NRHP reference No.: 74001871 (original); 87000643 (increase)

Significant dates
- Added to NRHP: December 31, 1974
- Boundary increase: April 23, 1987

Seneca Historic District is a historic district in Seneca, South Carolina, United States, that is listed on the National Register of Historic Places.

== Description ==
The district is located south of the railroad tracks in Seneca. The district consists of a number of homes and three churches that were built in the late nineteenth and early twentieth centuries. The houses have architectural styles that were popular in the period. It also includes a log cabin from the mid nineteenth century that was moved from Long Creek, South Carolina.

It was listed on the National Register of Historic Places December 31, 1974. Its boundaries were expanded April 23, 1987.

A map of the district is available.

== See also ==
- National Register of Historic Places listings in Oconee County, South Carolina
