= Oconee County Courthouse (1956) =

- U.S. National Register of Historic Places
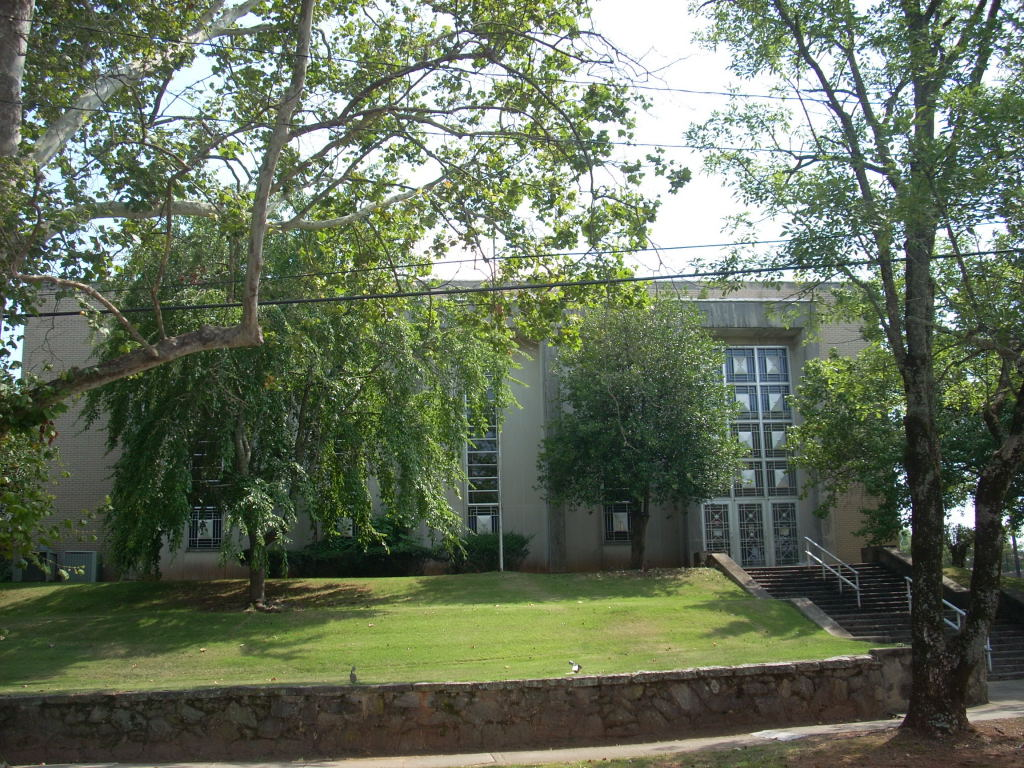

- Location within South Carolina Location within the United States
- Location: 211 W. Main St., Walhalla, South Carolina
- Coordinates: 34°45′55″N 83°4′7″W
- Area: less than one acre
- Built: 1956
- Architect: Lyles, Bissett, Carlisle & Wolff
- Architectural style: Modern Movement; Starved Classicism
- NRHP reference No.: 16000715
- Added to NRHP: October 11, 2016

The Oconee County Courthouse is a historic government building at 211 West Main Street in Walhalla, South Carolina. Built in 1956, it served as a county courthouse until 2003, when the present courthouse was opened next door. It was designed by the regional firm Lyles, Bissett, Carlisle & Wolff, known for its high quality Mid-Century Modern designs. This building is a fine local example of Starved Classicism, a style not found in other courthouses in South Carolina's hill counties.

The building was listed on the National Register of Historic Places in 2016, at which time it stood vacant.

== See also ==
- National Register of Historic Places listings in Oconee County, South Carolina
