= Killing of Zachary Hammond =

Police killing in South Carolina, US

- Date: July 26, 2015; 11 years ago
- Time: 8:20 p.m. EDT
- Location: Seneca, South Carolina, U.S.; 34.69307°N 82.97433°W
- Filmed by: Police dashcam camera
- Participants: Police lieutenant Mark Tiller (shooter)
- Deaths: Zachary Hammond
- Litigation: Lawsuit against City of Seneca settled for $2.15 million

The killing of Zachary Hammond occurred on July 26, 2015, in Seneca, South Carolina. Hammond, age 19, was shot in his car during an undercover narcotics operation that targeted his passenger. Hammond, unarmed, was shot twice by 32-year-old police lieutenant Mark Tiller.

Hammond's death was being investigated by the U.S. Department of Justice Civil Rights Division, Federal Bureau of Investigation (FBI), the U.S. Attorney for South Carolina, and the South Carolina Law Enforcement Division (SLED). SLED completed its investigation on August 31, turning its findings over to 10th Circuit Solicitor Chrissy Adams who, eight weeks later, declined to bring criminal charges against Tiller. On October 27, the dashcam video of the shooting was released.

== Backgrounds ==
=== Zachary Hammond ===
Zachary Richard Thomas Hammond (May 5, 1996 – July 26, 2015), son of Paul and Angie Hammond, was a 19-year-old white male. He was born in Greenville, South Carolina, and graduated from Seneca High School in 2014. Hammond had used cannabis recreationally and was driving under the influence of cocaine when he died. Previous text messages revealed a prior unwillingness to submit to law enforcement authority, and he had previously run through several police checkpoints in order to evade arrest, but charges were never filed in those cases.

=== Mark Tiller ===
Mark Tiller is a lieutenant in the Seneca Police Department. He was an officer since 2006, previously employed at West Pelzer police department. Before joining the Seneca Police Department in 2010, he worked at the Clemson Police Department. according to Seneca police chief John Covington, however Tiller does have some missing records, including "written reports about a missed court date and mishandling of a gun" and has changed police departments for unknown reasons in the last few years. He was 32 years old at the time of the shooting. The city released Lt. Mark Tiller's file to media outlets. The documents show one performance review from June 29 in which the officer received ratings of "excellent" in five of six categories and was rated "good" in job knowledge. The personnel file released to the media was subsequently found to be incomplete. A total of eight infractions had been omitted – infractions which should have resulted in disciplinary action and which may have reflected upon his fitness to be an officer. Had Tiller been properly disciplined, his behavior may have been corrected.

Seneca police chief John Covington fired Tiller in September 2016 calling it a "personnel matter".

== Shooting ==
According to police, Tori Morton, a 23-year-old female who was on her first date with Hammond, used Hammond's cell phone to text someone she was trying to sell marijuana to, but inadvertently texted a state trooper with a similar phone number. The state trooper contacted Seneca police, who sent an undercover police officer to meet with Morton and Hammond.

At around 8:20 p.m. on July 26, 2015, Hammond, with Morton as his passenger, drove his 2001 Honda Civic through a parking lot of a Hardee's restaurant, where the pair were texted by the undercover officer. Tiller was sent as backup for the undercover officer, and when Tiller arrived, he pulled his vehicle in behind Hammond's car in an attempt to block Hammond's escape. According to Tiller's account, Tiller approached Hammond's car, ordering him to show his hands. Hammond (who was 19 years old and weighed 121 pounds at the time of his death) panicked and began to drive away from the scene. Tiller claims that Hammond accelerated turning toward the officer, although this is not supported by the dashcam video. Tiller then fired two rounds from his .45 caliber handgun at close range through the open driver's side window of Hammond's car as Hammond tried to flee. Bullets struck Hammond in the left chest and left front shoulder. According to a police report, Tiller feared being run over by Hammond's vehicle when he backed it up and then pulled forward toward the officer. As seen in the dashcam video, Tiller was never in the path of Hammond's vehicle. Police contend that Hammond was under the influence of cocaine at the time of his death. However, in a lawsuit filed against Tiller and the Seneca Police Department, testimony suggests that cocaine was planted on Hammond's body after he had been shot and dragged from his car.

Following the shooting, Hammond's passenger was issued a summons for possession of 10 grams (0.35 oz) of marijuana. Police allege that she had planned to sell it to an undercover officer who had set up the deal.

Seneca police chief John Covington initially refused to release Tiller's name in violation of South Carolina's sunshine law, but did finally release it 12 days after the shooting in response to freedom of information requests. Covington referred to Tiller as a "victim" of "attempted murder" in an incident report, and stated that Tiller fired his weapon in self-defense because Hammond "drove his vehicle directly at the officer".

== Investigation ==
Hammond's death was ruled a homicide by the Oconee County coroner. An independent autopsy commissioned by Hammond's family indicated that the bullets penetrated from the back of Hammond's left shoulder and the left side of his torso. The shooting is under investigation by the South Carolina Law Enforcement Division (SLED). Dash camera video footage of the shooting was turned over to the agency for analysis.

Anthony Moon, another police officer who had arrived at the scene after the shooting, resigned during an internal affairs investigation on August 7. Seneca police chief John Covington stated that the investigation was a "personnel matter" and no additional information about it would be released.

Eric Bland, the attorney representing Hammond's family, requested intervention from the U.S. Attorney General, the U.S. Department of Justice (DOJ) and the Federal Bureau of Investigation (FBI) because of alleged civil rights violations.

On August 9, the U.S. Department of Justice Civil Rights Division announced that they would conduct an investigation into Hammond's death. The investigation will be joined by the FBI Columbia Field Office and the U.S. Attorney for South Carolina.

=== SLED investigation ===
SLED formally denied a request by The Post and Courier to release video footage from the police dashcam, citing the ongoing investigation. SLED completed its investigation on August 31, turning its findings over to Chrissy Adams, the 10th Circuit court Solicitor. Adams declined to release the dashcam video stating that it would take "several more weeks" before she would decide whether to charge Tiller for the shooting.

On October 27, Solicitor Adams announced that no criminal charges against Tiller would be sought and that further information would not be released until the U.S. Attorney's completes its investigation. The dashcam video of the shooting was released on the same day.

=== Witness accounts ===
According to attorneys for the Hammond family in a letter to the FBI, a witness saw Hammond's body pulled from the car. An officer then removed an object from the trunk of the police vehicle and placed it under Hammond's body. The witness also stated, "After Zachary had been shot and killed, members of the Seneca Police Department lifted his dead hand and 'high fived' Zachary Hammond." The solicitor's report dismissed the claims of wrongdoing on the part of police officers, noting that the officer who claimed to have high-fived Hammond's corpse was on the periphery of the scene and that the dash cams which captured the scene showed no malfeasance on the part of police.

Hammond's passenger Tori Morton gave her account of the shooting in a sworn affidavit:

Zach and I are sharing a chocolate dipped ice cream cone from McDonalds, and as we were pulling into a parking spot the police SUV was lighted (sic) up in blue flashing lights.

The two officers got out and had they're (sic) guns drawn, telling that he would blow our (expletive deleted) off and immediately started firing. As the shots rang the car moved/rolled forward and along the curb until another cop car smashed into the back of Zach's car to stop us. As they surrounded the car they started yelling "where's the gun get the gun." Zach was already dead and then they drug (sic) us out of the car onto the pavement. After I was handcuffed onto the ground and the officer that stood me up-he put the car in park.

== Reaction ==
Hammond's family criticized the media for their hypocrisy for treating his death differently than similar police officer shootings of unarmed citizens such as Walter Scott and Samuel DuBose.

On August 6, a candlelight vigil organized by the Facebook group "Remember Zach" was held at the Hardee's restaurant where Hammond was shot. More than 100 people attended a rally organized by an anti-gun violence group, Put Down The Guns Now Young People, on August 15 in Seneca. Demands for all law enforcement officers to wear body cameras were seen on social media in the wake of Hammond's death.

== Lawsuits ==
On September 28, 2015, Eric Bland, the attorney representing Hammond's family, filed a federal lawsuit calling for evidence in the shooting to be released and for "unspecified damages".

Eleven weeks after the shooting, three local newspapers and the South Carolina Press Association filed a lawsuit against SLED seeking release of the dash camera video under the Freedom of Information Act.

In March 2016, Hammond's family received $2.15 million from a settlement against the city of Seneca.

== See also ==
- List of killings by law enforcement officers in the United States
- Shooting of Walter Scott
- War on drugs
