= Faith Cabin Library at Seneca Junior College =

Historic building in South Carolina

- U.S. National Register of Historic Places
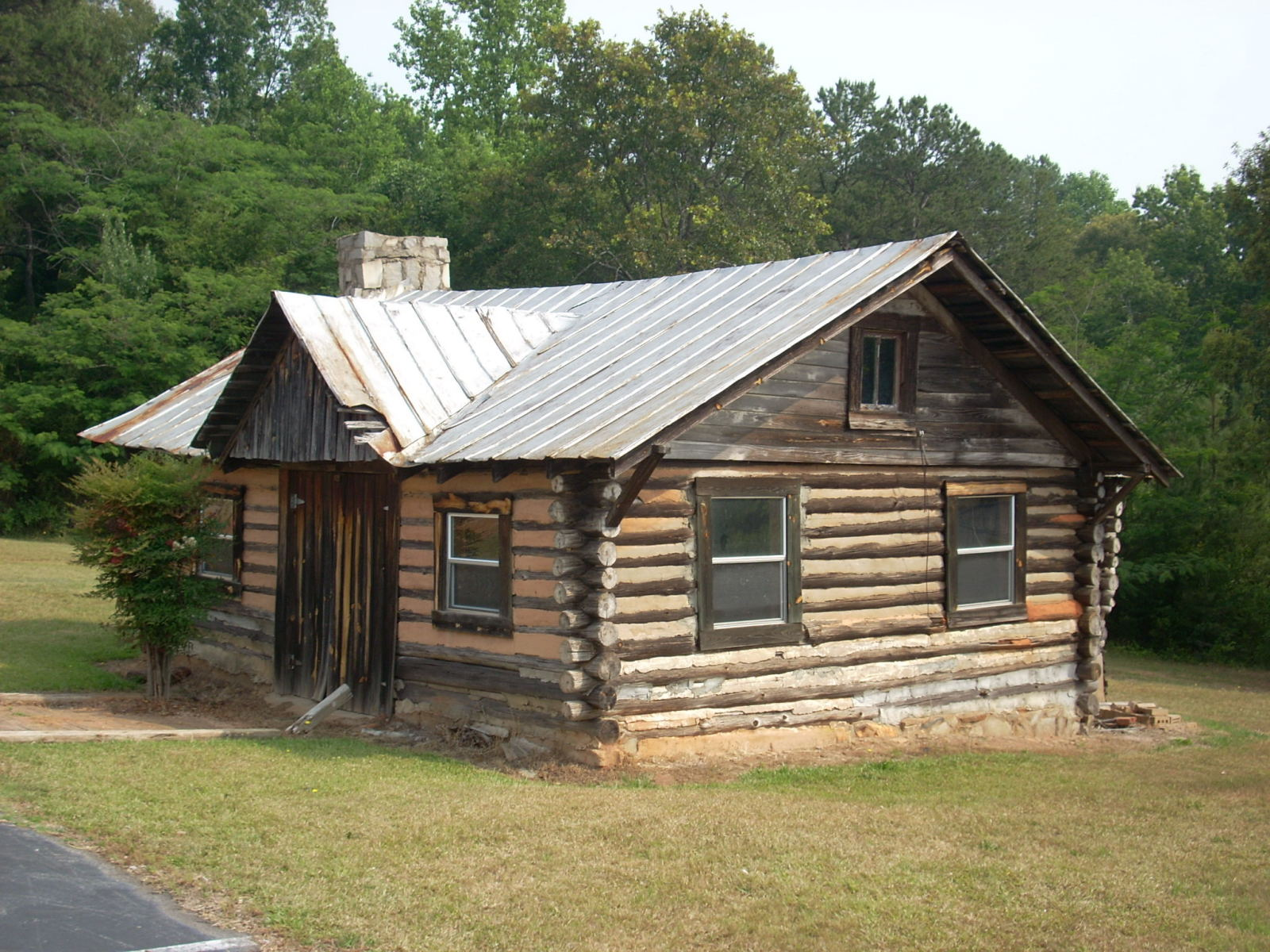
- Faith Cabin Library at Seneca Junior College

- Location within South Carolina Location within the United States
- Location: 298 S. Poplar Street, Seneca, South Carolina
- Coordinates: 34°40′50.7″N 82°57′34.5″W
- Built: 1937
- Architectural style: Log cabin
- MPS: Faith Cabin Libraries in South Carolina 1932-ca.1960 MPS
- NRHP reference No.: 12000942
- Added to NRHP: November 14, 2012

The Faith Cabin Library at Seneca Junior College is a Faith Cabin Library built to serve the African American community in Seneca, South Carolina. It was built on the campus of the Seneca Junior College. The log cabin library building was named to the National Register of Historic Places on November 14, 2012.

== Faith Cabin Libraries ==
In the early 20th century, library access in rural South Carolina was limited. Due to racial segregation, there was essentially no access for African Americans except in Charleston and Columbia. The program of Faith Cabin Libraries for African Americans was conceived by a white mill worker, Willie Lee Buffington, and his African American, childhood friend, Euriah Simpkins, who was a teacher. Books were solicited for the community by writing preachers and requesting donations. A large gift of about 1,000 books was given by a Methodist church in New York. With so many books, the first library in Saluda, South Carolina was built by African Americans. It was named the Faith Cabin Library, because one woman said "We didn't have money, all we had was faith."

Buffington finished high school and graduated from Furman University. Then he taught at the HBCUs Benedict College in Columbia, South Carolina and Paine College in Augusta, Georgia. He expanded the Faith Cabin Library program to Georgia. About thirty libraries were built in South Carolina and about seventy in Georgia. The Faith Cabin Library at Seneca Junior College, the Faith Cabin Library at Anderson County Training School, and the library at Bettis Academy and Junior College are the surviving library buildings in South Carolina. Several former locations of a Faith Cabin Library have historic markers including the first library in Saluda.

== Faith Cabin Library at Seneca Junior College ==
The log cabin library was built in 1937 adjacent to the Seneca Junior College. It is located at 298 South Poplar Street in Seneca. In the Faith Cabin Library system, it was named the Oberlin Unit in honor of the books donated by students of Oberlin College in Oberlin, Ohio. The library was only open for two years due to the closure of Seneca Junior College because of the Great Depression and the construction of new high school for African Americans in Seneca.

The main part of the T-shaped log cabin sits on a stone foundation. The rear wing rests on concrete piers. The building has a gabled roof with a V-crimped metal roof. There are double-hung sash windows on each side of the front door and the stone chimney on the left side, two similar windows on the right side and one on the rear wing. The gables are covered with horizontal wooden planks and have a window.

The other buildings of the Seneca Junior College no longer exist. Currently, the Seneca Institute Family Life Center has a brick and metal building, which was built in 1978. It is not included in the NRHP nomination.
