= Cherokee Creek Boys School =

Therapeutic boarding school in South Carolina, US

Location
- 198 Cooper Road; Westminster, South Carolina 29693; 34°39′58.57″N 83°17′42.18″W

Information
- Type: Therapuetic boarding school
- NCES District ID: A0509255

Cherokee Creek Boys School is an American therapeutic boarding school for boys located at 198 Cooper Road, Westminster, South Carolina, United States.

Cherokee Creek and is accredited by The Joint Commission, licensed by the state of South Carolina, is academically accredited by Cognia. The school is also a member of the National Association of Therapeutic Schools and Programs (NATSAP) and SEVIS approved to offer student visas for international students.

== History ==
Cherokee Creek Boys School was founded in 2003 by Beth and Ron Black.

The school is a place where struggling middle-school boys receive assistance from licensed therapists and qualified counselors to help them address specific physical, academic, emotional, and social skill needs for each student. Students that come to Cherokee Creek Boys School are typically challenged with one of the following: Attention Deficit Disorder (ADD/ADHD), Autism, Autism, depression, anxiety, defiant behavior, under-developed social skills, or learning disabilities.

== Description ==
The staff at Cherokee Creek Boys School employ four core areas within the program: Personal Enrichment (ex. league sports, guitar lessons, martial arts), Academics (ex. Individual Education Plans and special academic services), Therapetic Services (ex. individual and group therapy, group counseling, crisis intervention and family therapy), and Health/Recreation (ex. swimming, hiking, boating, horseback riding, and camping).
