= Oconee County Cage =

- U.S. National Register of Historic Places
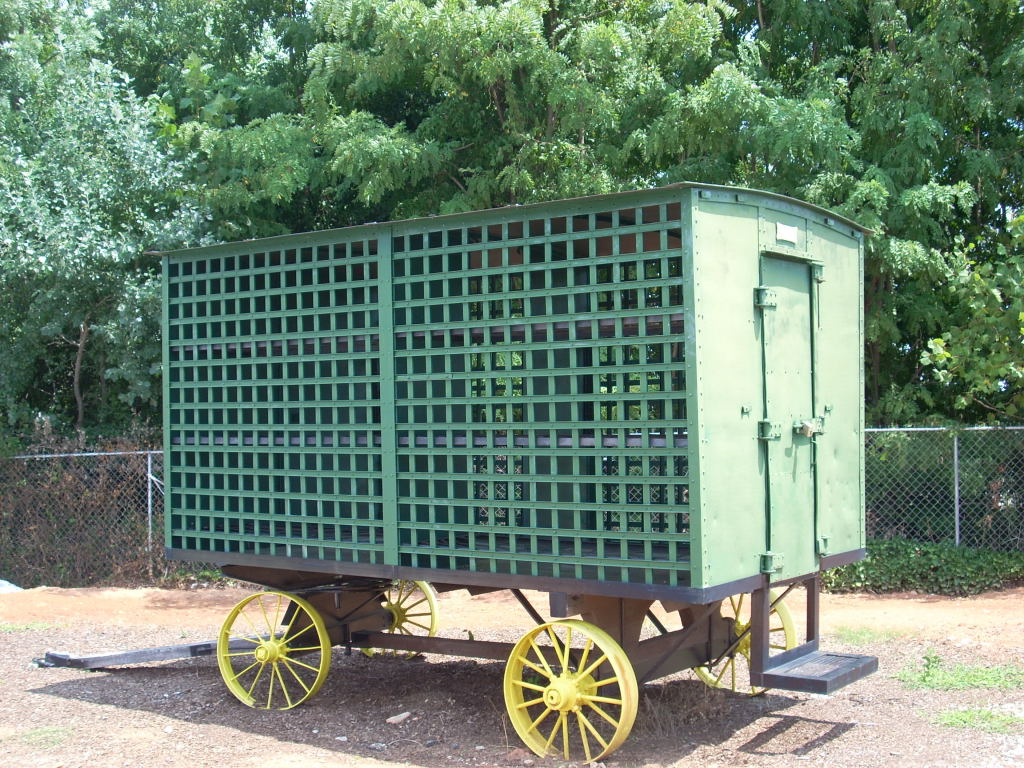
- Oconee County Cage in 2009

- Location within South Carolina Location within the United States
- Location: Browns Square Drive., Walhalla, South Carolina
- Coordinates: 34°45′51.5″N 83°4′0.8″W
- Area: less than one acre
- MPS: Oconee County Penal System TR
- NRHP reference No.: 82001523
- Added to NRHP: November 14, 1982

The Oconee County Cage is a former jail on wheels that is located at Browns Square Drive outside of the Oconee Heritage Center in Walhalla, South Carolina, USA in Oconee County. At the time of its listing, it was located on Church Street at the Oconee County Law Enforcement Center. It was named to the National Register of Historic Places on November 14, 1982 along with the Oconee County Jail. At the time of its listing, the cage was considered the most intact cage in South Carolina. Oconee County has preserved the cage as a reminder of the former harsh conditions faced by convicts in the early twentieth century.

== Early 20th-century county penal system ==
In the early twentieth century, county jails in South Carolina were primarily for holding individuals who were awaiting trial that could not afford bail. Male convicted prisoners were either sentenced to hard labor on the county chain gang or sent to the state penitentiary. In 1916, about 94% were in county chain gangs and about 6% were at the state penitentiary. In this period of racial segregation, white prisoners were separated from African-American prisoners.

Instead of being housed in the county jail, chain gangs were housed in cages, cars, or tents near the work site. The cages and cars could be used to also transport the convicts.

== History ==
This jail on wheels was one of several used in the early twentieth century for the housing and transport of prisoners on the chain gang. It was built around 1900.

In 1915, the State Board of Charities and Corrections reported that the chain gang was about 4 mi (6 km) from Seneca where the convicts were repairing the Oconee Station Road. There were two cages. One held eight African-American men and the other held four white men. For breakfast, they ate bacon, biscuits, syrup, and coffee. For dinner, they ate cabbage, bacon, and cornbread. For supper, they had bacon, biscuits, and syrup. In 1917, they reported that the cages were screened. In 1918, they said that the chain gang only had African Americans. White convicts were held at the jail or sent to the state penitentiary.

The chain gang convicts typically had a sentence of two months or less. Their families could visit on weekends and bring food. One former convict recalled that the convicts, guards, and their families all ate together and talked.

In the 1930s, the county had gasoline-powered trucks and built a new jail. The cages were no longer used. Although the chain gang faced harsh conditions during this period, it was considered to be an improvement over that faced by many convicts prior to 1900.

There is a similar jail on wheels in the neighboring Pickens County.

== Architecture ==
It is a metal cage on a chassis with wheels. Draft animals were hitched to a metal tongue attached to the front axle. The cage is approximately 14 ft (4.3 m) long, 8 ft (2.4 m), and 7 ft (2.1 m) high. The front, top, and floor are solid sheet metal. The sides of the cage are metal bars with riveted strips to form a grid. The rear is sheet metal with a hinged metal door.

The cage had four metal bunk beds with three beds each along the sides. The bunks had metal strips to support the bedding. There was a metal barrel in the center for a fire. Canvas was used to cover the sides in cold weather.

Additional pictures of the cage are available.

== See also ==
- Oconee Heritage Center
