= Tamassee, South Carolina =

Human settlement in Oconee County, South Carolina, US

Tamassee
- Census-designated place
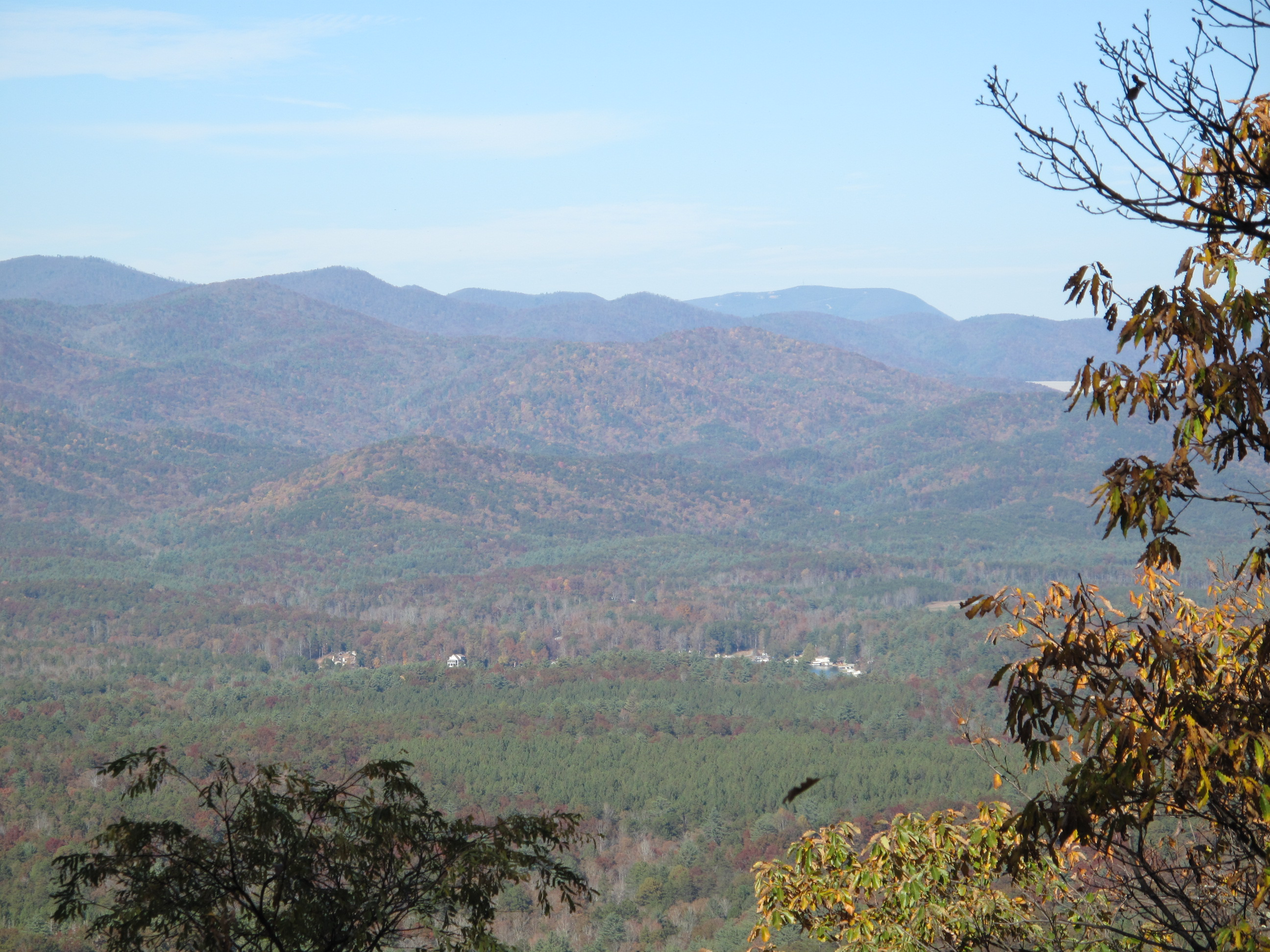
- Taken from Tamassee Knob Mountain
- Interactive map of Tamassee
- Coordinates: 34°52′38″N 83°00′58″W
- Country: United States
- State: South Carolina
- County: Oconee

Area
  - Total: 1.17 sq mi (3.02 km^{2})
  - Land: 1.17 sq mi (3.02 km^{2})
  - Water: 0 sq mi (0.00 km^{2})
- Elevation: 1,073 ft (327 m)

Population (2020)
  - Total: 60
  - Density: 51.5/sq mi (19.89/km^{2})
- Time zone: UTC-5 (Eastern (EST))
  - Summer (DST): UTC-4 (EDT)
- ZIP code: 29686
- Area codes: 864, 821
- FIPS code: 45-71170
- GNIS feature ID: 2812982

Tamassee is an unincorporated community and census-designated place (CDP) located in northwestern Oconee County, South Carolina, United States. It was first listed as a CDP in the 2020 census with a population of 60.

== Overview ==
The Tamassee area is located in and very near the Blue Ridge Mountains. A large part of the community occupies the Cheohee Valley.

The valley is surrounded by a portion of the southern Blue Ridge Mountains called the "Chattooga Escarpment" in reference to a Federally Designated Wild and Scenic River, the Chattooga, which flows just beyond these mountain ridges.

Tamassee is bordered on the west and north by the Pickens Ranger District of the Sumter National Forest. This area of national forest is characterized by a portion of the Blue Ridge Escarpment, rivers, waterfalls and hiking trails. The area is noted for its extremely rich biological diversity due to unique soil characteristics and elevated annual precipitation levels.

== History: Cherokee origins ==
The name "Tamassee" means "Place of the Sunlight of God", according to an interpretation of the Cherokee word which gave the area its original title. Tamassee was the name given by the Cherokee to originally describe a Cherokee village in the area, which legend tells, was home to a magical and powerful Cherokee prophet. The Cherokee town of Tamassee was destroyed and abandoned on August 12, 1776 when Major Andrew Pickens of the South Carolina Militia fought in the famed "Ring Fight". The Ring Fight happened when a scouting detachment numbering around 25 men under Major (later General) Andrew Pickens was ambushed by a local band of Cherokees and Loyalists numbering over 100. Pickens ordered his men to make a circle and another circle within the circle. When one circle would fire, the other would fire while the others where reloading. Fierce hand to hand fighting with tomahawks and knives erupted. The Patriot Militia set fire to the nearby cane plants, which made a popping noise that sounded like musket fire and reinforcements. The Cherokee fled back to Tamassee Town. The Battle was won by the time the reinforcements arrived. Later on in the day, the South Carolina Militiamen under Major Andrew Williamson destroyed and drove the Cherokee from the otherwise peaceful village. There is currently a South Carolina state historical marker denoting the Cherokee Village of "Tamassee Town" in the Cheohee Valley of Tamassee.

Today, the Tamassee area maintains a rural and agricultural foundation, and is used by people for day hikes, country drives and historical investigation.

== Demographics ==
Historical population
Census	Pop.	Note	%±
2020	60		—
U.S. Decennial Census; 2020

Tamassee first appeared as a census designated place in the 2020 U.S. census.

=== 2020 census ===
Tamassee CDP, South Carolina – Demographic Profile (NH = Non-Hispanic)
Race / Ethnicity	Pop 2020	% 2020
White alone (NH)	53	88.33%
Black or African American alone (NH)	4	6.67%
Native American or Alaska Native alone (NH)	0	0.00%
Asian alone (NH)	0	0.00%
Pacific Islander alone (NH)	0	0.00%
Some Other Race alone (NH)	0	0.00%
Mixed Race/Multi-Racial (NH)	3	5.00%
Hispanic or Latino (any race)	0	0.00%
Total	60	100.00%

Note: the US Census treats Hispanic/Latino as an ethnic category. This table excludes Latinos from the racial categories and assigns them to a separate category. Hispanics/Latinos can be of any race.

== See also ==
- Tamassee DAR School
