= Westminster, South Carolina =

- City
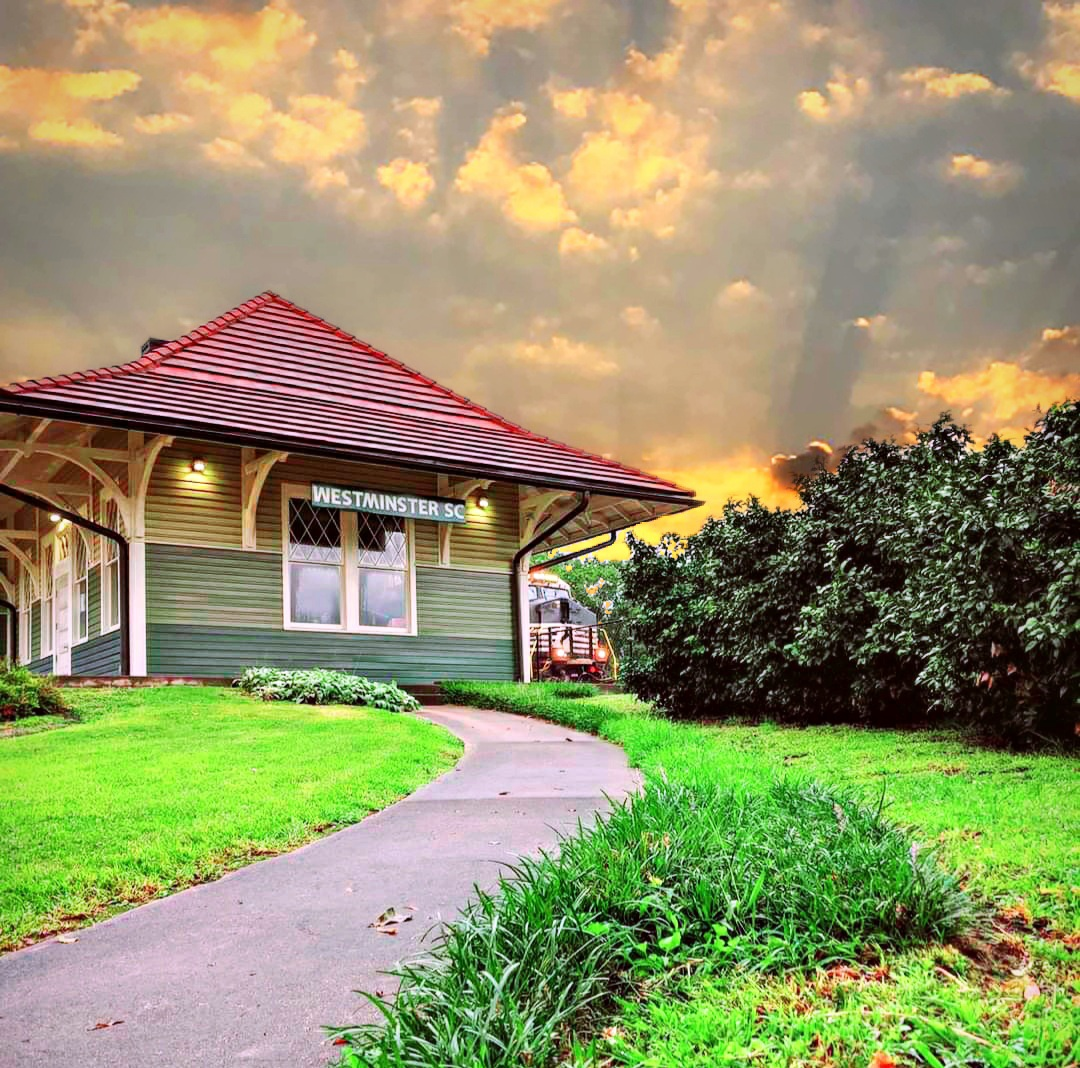
- Southern Railways historic passenger depot

- Location in Oconee County and the state of South Carolina.
- Coordinates: 34°39′56″N 83°05′28″W
- Country: United States
- State: South Carolina
- County: Oconee

Area
  - Total: 3.45 sq mi (8.94 km^{2})
  - Land: 3.45 sq mi (8.93 km^{2})
  - Water: 0.0039 sq mi (0.01 km^{2})
- Elevation: 906 ft (276 m)

Population (2020)
  - Total: 2,353
  - Density: 683/sq mi (263.6/km^{2})
- Time zone: UTC−5 (Eastern (EST))
  - Summer (DST): UTC−4 (EDT)
- ZIP code: 29693
- Area codes: 864, 821
- FIPS code: 45-76165
- GNIS feature ID: 2405719
- Website: www.westminstersc.org

Westminster is a city in Oconee County, South Carolina, United States. As of the 2020 census, Westminster had a population of 2,353.

== History ==
Westminster was founded in 1874 upon completion of the Atlanta and Richmond Air-Line Railway and incorporated on March 17, 1875 when the charter was signed. It was founded as a water stop on the Southern Railway. As stores, shops and factories started to set up around the train stop, it bloomed into a decent-sized town. Its peak of expansion came in the 1920s.

The Retreat Rosenwald School and Southern Railway Passenger Station are listed on the National Register of Historic Places.

The Apple Festival is celebrated annually.

== Geography ==
According to the United States Census Bureau, the city has a total area of 3.4 square miles (8.9 km^{2}), all land.

Located in the foothills of the Blue Ridge Mountains, Westminster is surrounded by several rivers, 150 waterfalls, and two major lakes.

== Demographics ==
Historical population
Census	Pop.	Note	%±
1880	162		—
1890	532		228.4%
1900	857		61.1%
1910	1,576		83.9%
1920	1,847		17.2%
1930	1,774		−4.0%
1940	2,014		13.5%
1950	2,219		10.2%
1960	2,413		8.7%
1970	2,521		4.5%
1980	3,114		23.5%
1990	3,120		0.2%
2000	2,743		−12.1%
2010	2,418		−11.8%
2020	2,353		−2.7%
U.S. Decennial Census

=== 2020 census ===
As of the 2020 census, Westminster had a population of 2,353. The median age was 39.7 years. 22.9% of residents were under the age of 18 and 20.1% of residents were 65 years of age or older. For every 100 females there were 92.2 males, and for every 100 females age 18 and over there were 86.5 males age 18 and over.

There were 958 households in Westminster, of which 34.0% had children under the age of 18 living in them. Of all households, 39.1% were married-couple households, 19.5% were households with a male householder and no spouse or partner present, and 35.6% were households with a female householder and no spouse or partner present. About 29.4% of all households were made up of individuals and 14.8% had someone living alone who was 65 years of age or older.

There were 1,134 housing units, of which 15.5% were vacant. The homeowner vacancy rate was 2.1% and the rental vacancy rate was 9.5%.

0.0% of residents lived in urban areas, while 100.0% lived in rural areas.

Racial composition as of the 2020 census
Race	Number	Percent
White	1,891	80.4%
Black or African American	207	8.8%
American Indian and Alaska Native	8	0.3%
Asian	8	0.3%
Native Hawaiian and Other Pacific Islander	3	0.1%
Some other race	80	3.4%
Two or more races	156	6.6%
Hispanic or Latino (of any race)	155	6.6%

=== 2000 census ===
As of the census of 2000, there were 2,743 people, 1,191 households, and 761 families residing in the city. The population density was 796.6 inhabitants per square mile (307.6/km^{2}). There were 1,333 housing units at an average density of 387.1 per square mile (149.5/km^{2}). The racial makeup of the city was 85.60% White, 11.81% African American, 0.04% Native American, 0.18% Asian, 1.20% from other races, and 1.17% from two or more races. Hispanic or Latino of any race were 2.48% of the population.

There were 1,191 households, out of which 26.9% had children under the age of 18 living with them, 44.7% were married couples living together, 14.6% had a female householder with no husband present, and 36.1% were non-families. 32.2% of all households were made up of individuals, and 13.9% had someone living alone who was 65 years of age or older. The average household size was 2.30 and the average family size was 2.90.

In the city, the population was spread out, with 23.5% under the age of 18, 9.6% from 18 to 24, 27.0% from 25 to 44, 24.6% from 45 to 64, and 15.3% who were 65 years of age or older. The median age was 38 years. For every 100 females, there were 89.6 males. For every 100 females age 18 and over, there were 84.0 males.

The median income for a household in the city was $30,802, and the median income for a family was $36,678. Males had a median income of $30,104 versus $21,690 for females. The per capita income for the city was $17,121. About 6.8% of families and 9.3% of the population were below the poverty line, including 14.2% of those under age 18 and 9.8% of those age 65 or over.

== Economy ==
Westminster is home to several industries; among them are: US Engine Valve plant, Ulbrich (flat wire manufacturing plant), and Sandvik Tooling Supply, a global supplier of tungsten carbide cutting tools.

== Education ==
West-Oak High School is the public high school that most students from Westminster attend. The school draws students from across one half of Oconee County. The city also offers several elementary schools: Westminster Elementary, Orchard Park Elementary, and Fair Oak Elementary. Westminster Elementary and Orchard Park Elementary are both pre-kindergarten to 5th grade, though Fair Oak different because it is pre-kindergarten to 3rd grade and then the students transfer over to Fair Oak Intermediate for 4th and 5th grade. Oakway intermediate is now closed an Fair Oak services Pre-K to 5th. The town also offers a middle school for grades 6 to 8.

Westminster has a lending library, a branch of the Oconee County Public Library.

== Arts and culture ==
=== Annual culture events ===
Westminster is the home of the South Carolina Apple Festival. The annual celebration is held during the first two weeks of September, and features a parade, street vendors and booths, a rodeo, and other family activities. Westminster and the nearby community of Long Creek have several commercial apple orchards.

Westminster hosts the South Carolina Bigfoot Festival each October.

Westminster welcomes car enthusiasts and is a popular 'cruising' destination where people come from all over the tri-state area to display their vehicles. Westminster holds the title of "The Southeast's Cruising Destination."

From April - October, the town has Music on Main where Main Street is roped off and a stage is set up for musicians to perform live.

In April and September of each year, "pickers" from near and far gather on Main Street for the Westminster Bluegrass Jam. An event where people bring their instruments and gather on the street to play music together.

There is also a Christmas Parade, Veterans Day Parade, and Apple Festival Parade each year on Main Street.

=== Museums and other points of interest ===
The train depot, which is on the National Register of Historic Places, burned due to vandalism in 2005. It has been rebuilt.

Oconee Heritage Center General Store Museum is located on Main St. in Downtown Westminster. This museum displays a vast collection of original artifacts from the historic England's General Merchandise store of Westminster and features exhibits on the history of the greater Westminster, SC, area.

Gateway Arts Center is located on Windsor Street, just one block off main, and offers gallery showings, youth camps andafter school programs.

Westminster has their own recreation department located on Anderson Avenue.

== Education ==
- Cherokee Creek Boys School

== Notable people ==
- Gresham Barrett, former U.S. Representative for South Carolina's 3rd congressional district; born in Westminster.
- Jared Burton, Major League Baseball player for the Minnesota Twins; born in Westminster.
- Todd Chrisley, entrepreneur and reality television star; raised in Westminster.
- Andy Lee, American football punter for the Carolina Panthers of the National Football League; born in Westminster.
