= Tamassee Hope Village =

- U.S. National Register of Historic Places
- U.S. Historic district
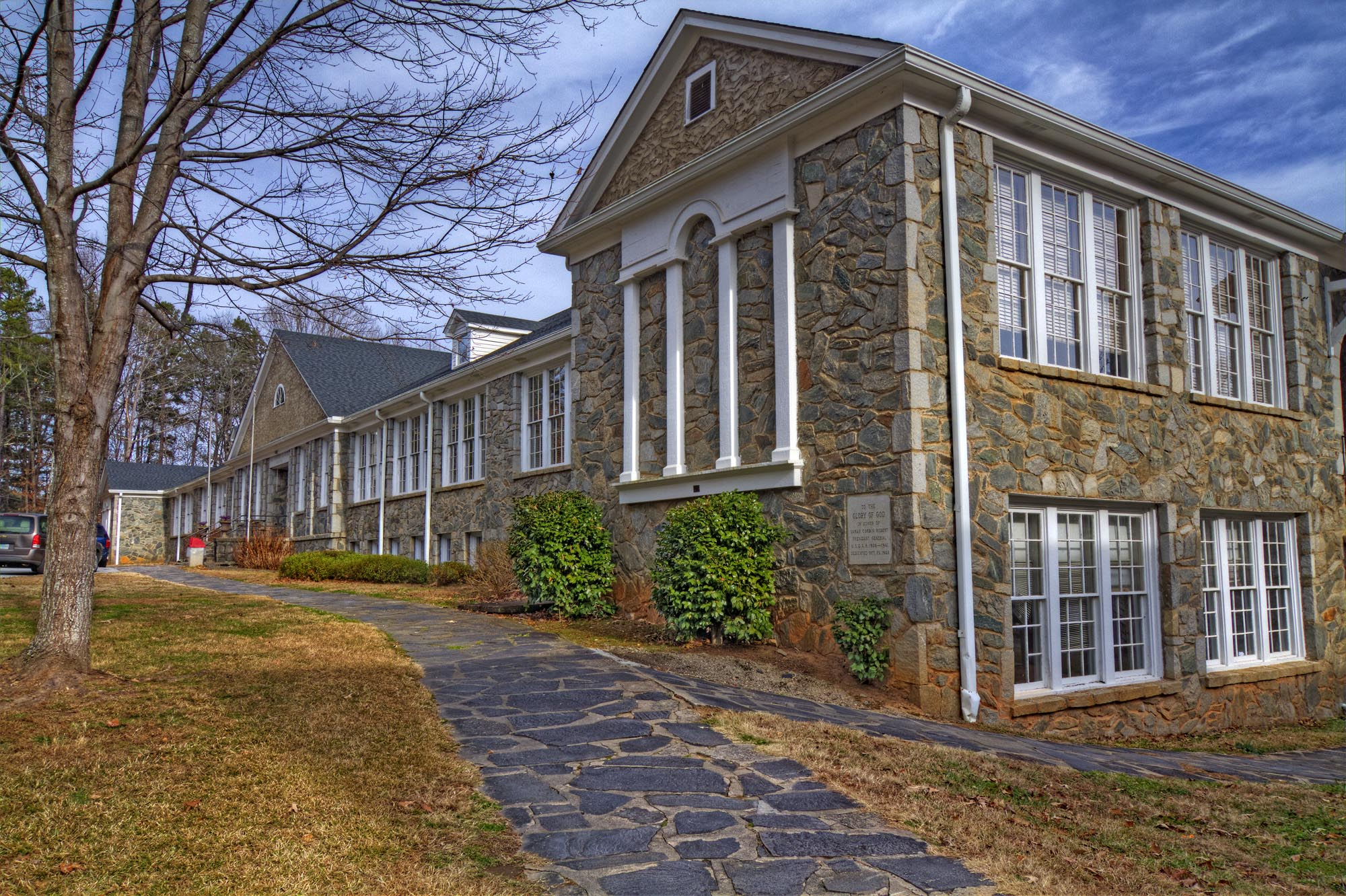

- Location within South Carolina
- Location: Tamassee, South Carolina
- Coordinates: 34°53′1″N 83°1′4″W
- NRHP reference No.: 12000289
- Added to NRHP: May 16, 2012

The Tamassee Hope Village, formally known as Tamassee DAR School, is a school in Tamassee, South Carolina, founded in 1919 by the Daughters of the American Revolution to serve the underprivileged children of Appalachia. Historic buildings can be observed on the Tamassee Hope Village campus.
