= McPhail Angus Farm =

Historic house in South Carolina, United States

- U.S. National Register of Historic Places
- U.S. Historic district
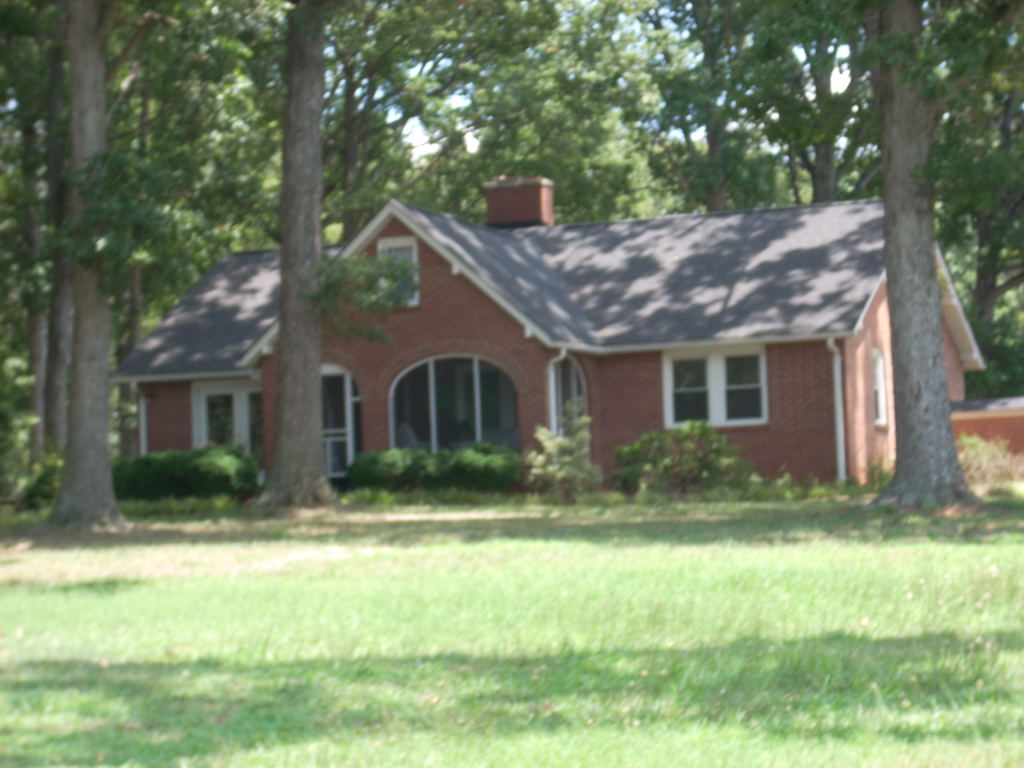
- John A. McPhail House

- Location within South Carolina Location within the United States
- Location: Oconee County, at 320 Coyote Lane off Pine Grove Road
- Nearest city: Seneca, South Carolina
- Coordinates: 34°33′18″N 82°56′24″W
- Area: 209.7 acres (84.9 ha)
- Built: 1902
- Architectural style: Bungalow/Craftsman
- NRHP reference No.: 07000396
- Added to NRHP: November 7, 2007

The McPhail Angus Farm is a farm at 320 Coyote Trail near Seneca, South Carolina in Oconee County. It is also known as the Tokena Angus Farm. It was named to the National Register of Historic Places as a historic district on November 7, 2007. It was named because of its significance to the transition from a nineteenth-century cotton farm to a twentieth-century, Upstate, cattle farm.

== History ==
John Augustus McPhail (1876–1961) purchased the original 150 acres (61 ha) farm in 1902. The property is believed to be a portion of the Revolutionary War patriot Samuel Earle's Beaverdam Plantation. Additional parcels were acquired to give the farm 468 acres (189 ha) by 1931.

Walter Hoolu McPail (1901–1979), the eldest son, was born in Sandy Springs, South Carolina and moved to the farm in 1902. He went to elementary school at Tokeena School No. 1, which is now on the farm property. He attended Townville High School. Walter McPhail's purchase of a heifer when he was eight years old began his lifelong interest in cattle. Although he started at nearby Clemson College, he came home in the spring for cotton planting.

In the late 1920s, the price of cotton dropped significantly due to overproduction and the Wall Street Crash of 1929. Many left the farm for textile mill villages and temporary work with the Works Progress Administration or other New Deal public works projects. Many farms dependent on cotton were in financial trouble.

In 1936, W.H. McPhail purchased his first registered Angus cows. This led to the development of one of the first black Angus herds in South Carolina. In 1939, he planted fescue grass using seed from an Anderson County test plot to provide cool weather pastures for his cattle. Eventually fescue was grown for both cattle feed and as a seed crop. Thus, in the course of generation, the farm made the transition from being a cotton farm to a cattle and seed production farm.

The farm has been named a South Carolina Century Farm by the Pendleton District Commission. Its Angus herd has been named a National Historic Herd by the American Angus Association.

In 2007, the farm had 249 acres (101 ha) including 194 acres (79 ha) in the historic district.

== Architecture ==
There are eight contributing properties that define the historic and architectural nature of the McPhail Angus Farm. Since this is a working farm, there are additional non-contributing structures that are more recent additions and changes to the farm.

=== John A. McPhail House ===
The John A. McPhail House was constructed about 1943. It is a one-story brick house on a poured concrete foundation. The door and window casings are unfinished pine boards sawn from trees harvested on the farm. The house was modified in the 1950s with a new entrance door for a beauty shop. This door was replaced in the 1990s with a French door. Another front entrance was added around 1962 and replaced in 2000. In 2007, the house was still occupied.

=== Jack Robinson tenant house ===
This is one-story, wood board and batten house that was built around 1890. It rests on stacked rocks. The house has no interior wall covering. Although it now has windows, it probably just had openings that may have been covered with parchment or oiled rawhide. It has two rooms and a central brick fireplace. The ceilings, most of the interior walls, and the chimney are whitewashed.

=== Norris tenant house ===
This is similar board and batten house. The interior walls are largely covered with bead board panels. Some the panels are whitewashed. Others and the ceiling are natural brown. The house has four square rooms and a wide porch across the width of the house. The brick fireplace is whitewashed up to the level of the mantel.

=== Mule/cattle barn ===
This barn was probably built around 1886. Originally, it had unpainted clapboard siding with a metal roof. In its early days, the barn housed mules used on the cotton farm. The top floors of the barns were used for storing hay. In the early 1940s, a new section was added for the farm's cattle. Some mule stalls were replaced with feeding troughs. In 1968, the siding was replaced with flush poplar boards, which were painted red. In the early 1990s, the roof was coated with tar.

=== Fertilizer/truck shed ===
This frame shed was probably built around 1900. Its first purpose was for the storage of cotton by the sharecropper families prior to ginning and for the storage of commercial guano fertilizer. Later it was used for farm trucks. It was constructed of wood with a metal roof. The exterior was whitewashed. After the roof collapsed in the early 1960s due to heavy snow, the shed was reconstructed. Side sheds were added for additional farm trucks. As of 2007, the shed was still used for storing farm trucks and equipment.

=== Corn crib ===
This wooded corn crib with clapboard siding and a metal roof was built around 1900. Corn shucks were stored on the ground floor. Oats for the mules were stored in the upper level.

=== Chicken coop ===
This frame chicken coop has clapboard siding and a metal roof. It has an open covered side. The open part had nest boxes. The enclosed part was for newly hatched chicks. This had a wood-fired heater to keep the chicks warm until they grew feathers. The former chicken coop is now used for equipment storage.

=== Terraced agricultural fields ===
The terraced fields were constructed when the land was used for cotton. Now they are planted with fescue, clover, and Bermuda grass for the cattle. The terraces follow the natural contours of the hills to prevent soil erosion. The original fences were woven wire with a strand of barbed wire on the top. Ford Model T body rails were used for corner posts. Many of these have been replaced recently.

=== Non-contributing structures ===
Being a working farm, there are modern structures built in the 1960s or later. A large flat top barn was built on the foundations of Tokeena School No. 1, which was later used as the Walter H. McPhail house.
