= Retreat Rosenwald School =

- U.S. National Register of Historic Places
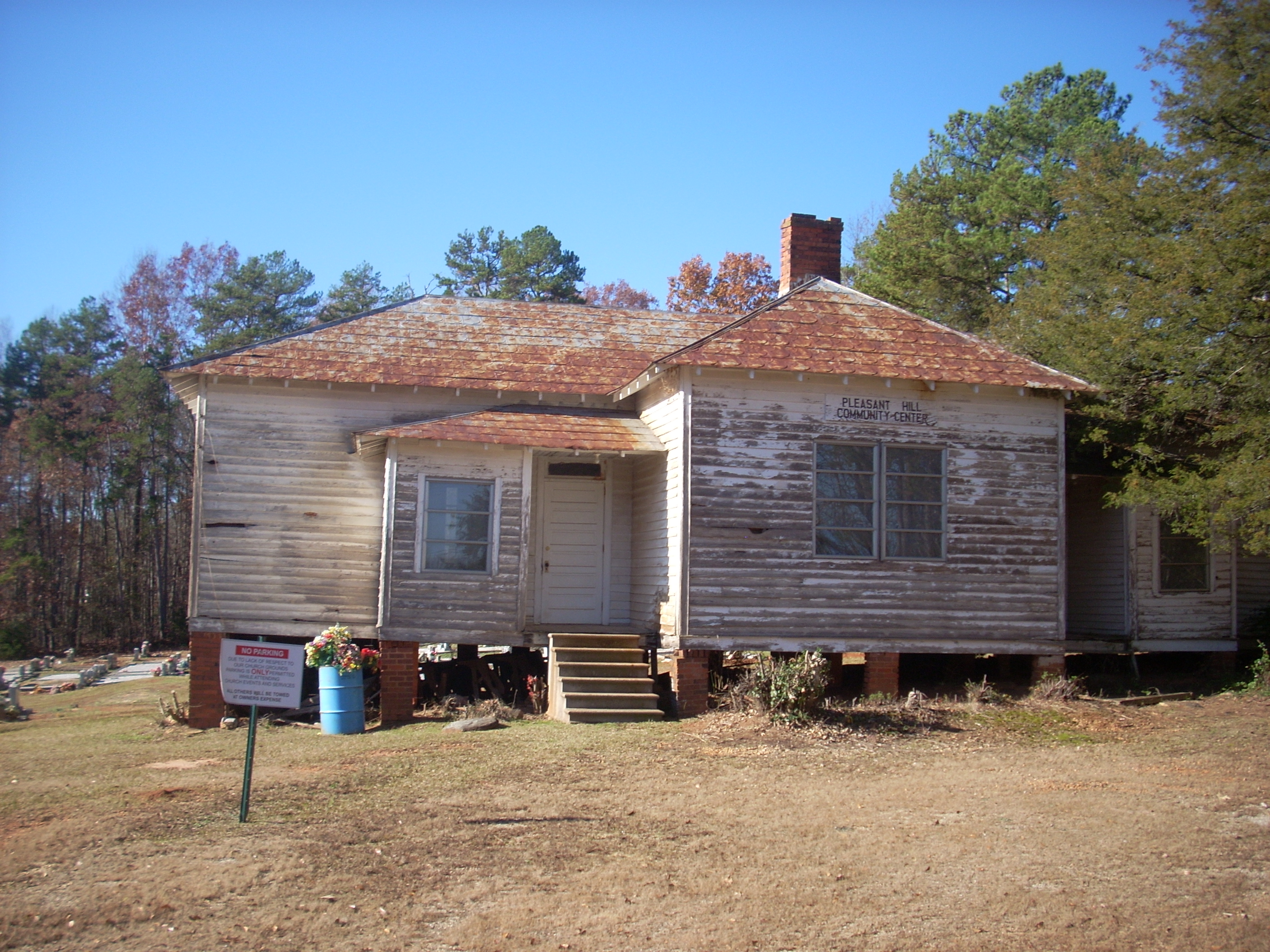
- Retreat Rosenwald School, November 2009

- Location within South Carolina Location within the United States
- Location: 150 Pleasant Hill Cir., Westminster, South Carolina
- Coordinates: 34°38′28″N 83°3′50″W
- Area: less than one acre
- Built: 1924
- MPS: Rosenwald School Building Program in South Carolina, 1917-1932
- NRHP reference No.: 11000676
- Added to NRHP: September 15, 2011

Retreat Rosenwald School, also known as the Retreat Colored School, is a historic Rosenwald School located at Westminster, Oconee County, South Carolina.

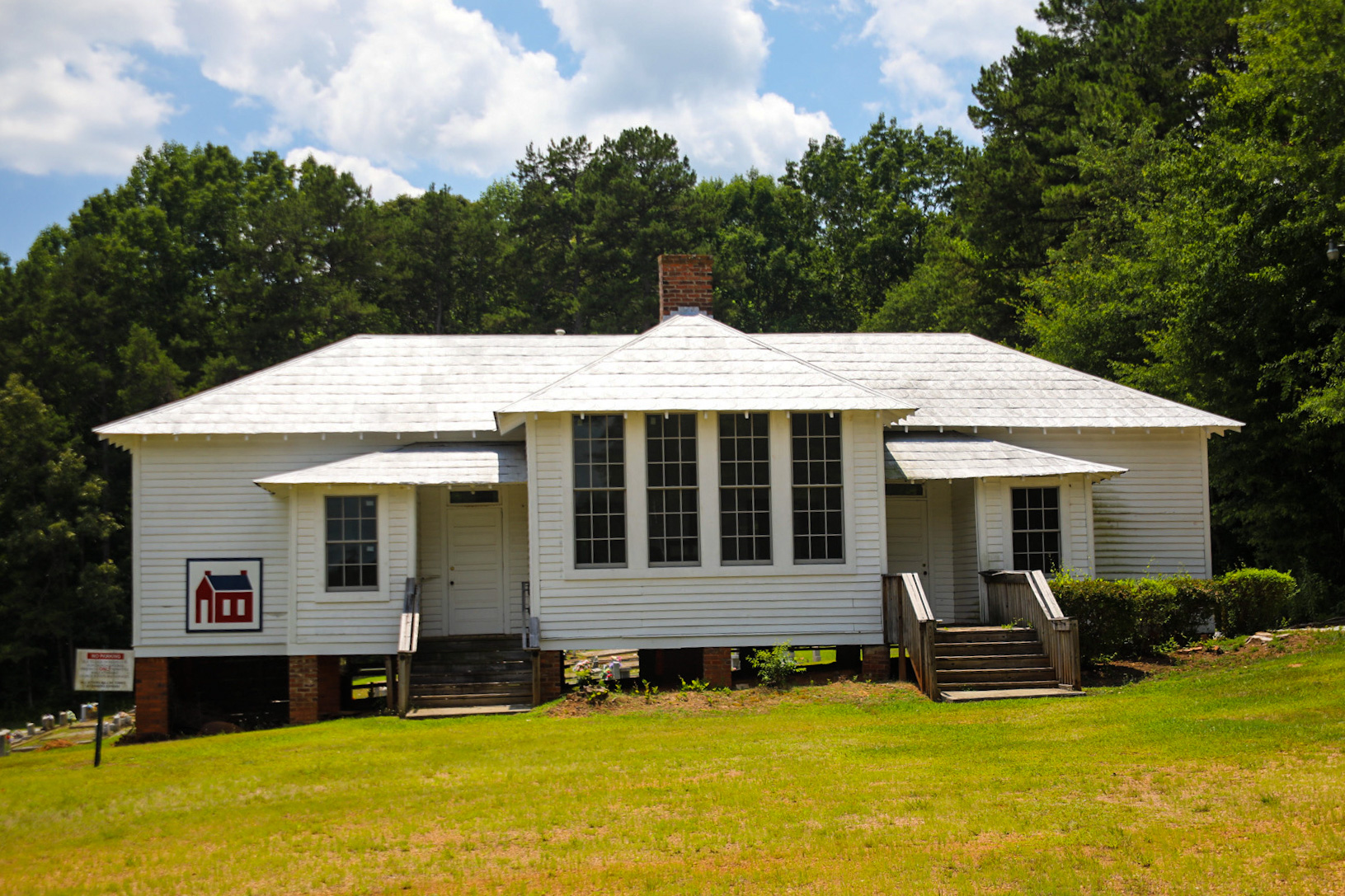
Restored Retreat Rosenwald School

It was built in 1924, and is a one-story, T-shaped, two-teacher community school. The building has three main rooms consisting of two classrooms and an industrial room in the forward-projecting wing. The school closed in 1950.

It was added to the National Register of Historic Places in 2011.
