= Russell House (Mountain Rest, South Carolina) =

- U.S. National Register of Historic Places
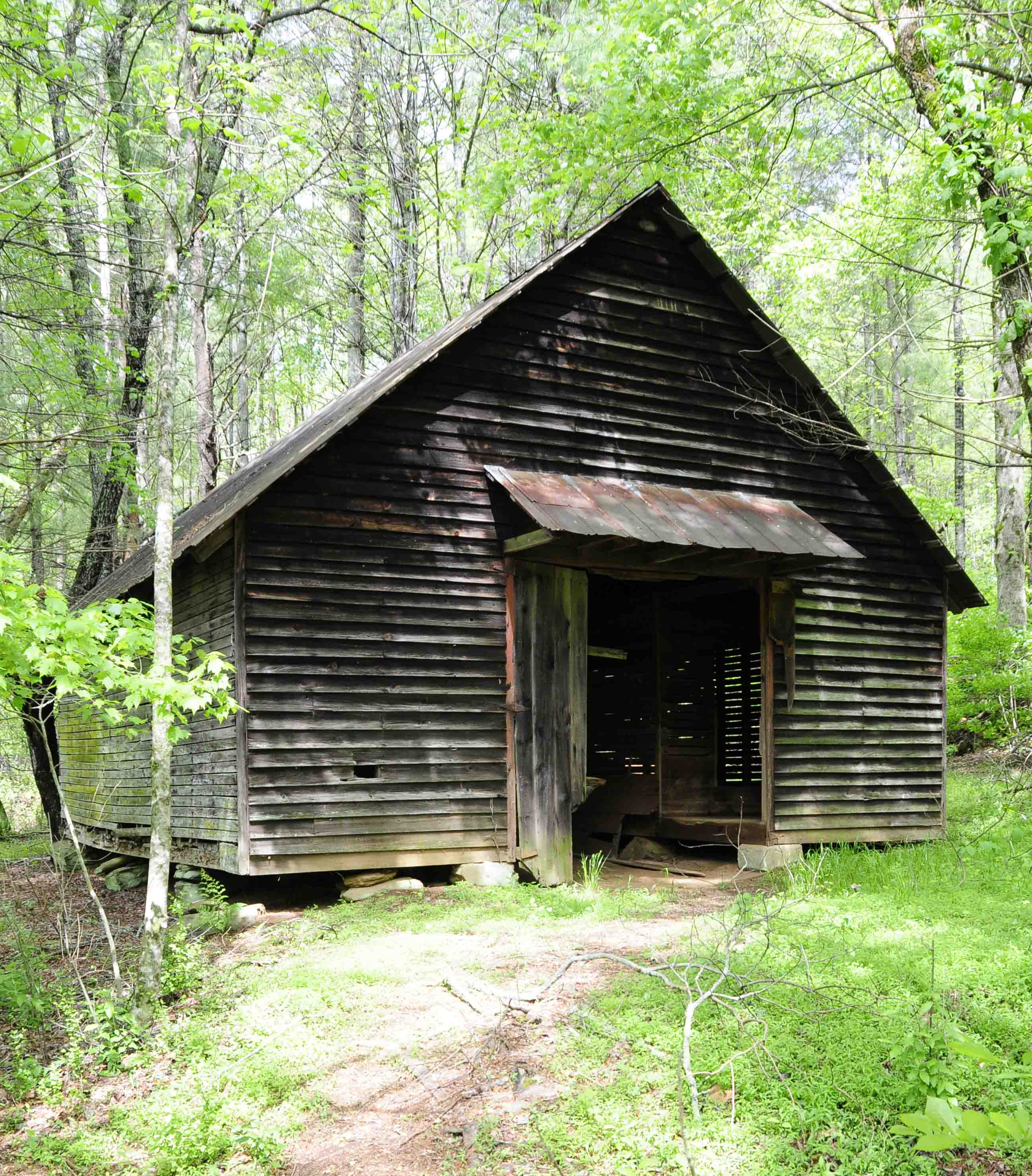
- Russell House, April 2012

- Location within South Carolina Location within the United States
- Location: Northwest of Mountain Rest on South Carolina Highway 28, near Mountain Rest, South Carolina
- Coordinates: 34°54′34″N 83°10′21″W
- Area: 5 acres (2.0 ha)
- Built: ca. 1867, c. 1890
- NRHP reference No.: 83004549
- Added to NRHP: February 29, 1988

Russell House was a historic inn located near Mountain Rest, Oconee County, South Carolina. It was built about 1867, and considerably expanded around 1890, and served as an inn for travelers between Walhalla and the mountain resort area. The Russell House, two storage buildings, and a privy were destroyed by fire in 1988. Located on the property are the contributing ruins of a log barn, a spring house, outhouse, garage, corn crib, and potato cellar.

It was added to the National Register of Historic Places in 1988.
