= Westminster station (South Carolina) =

- Southern Railway Passenger Station
- U.S. National Register of Historic Places
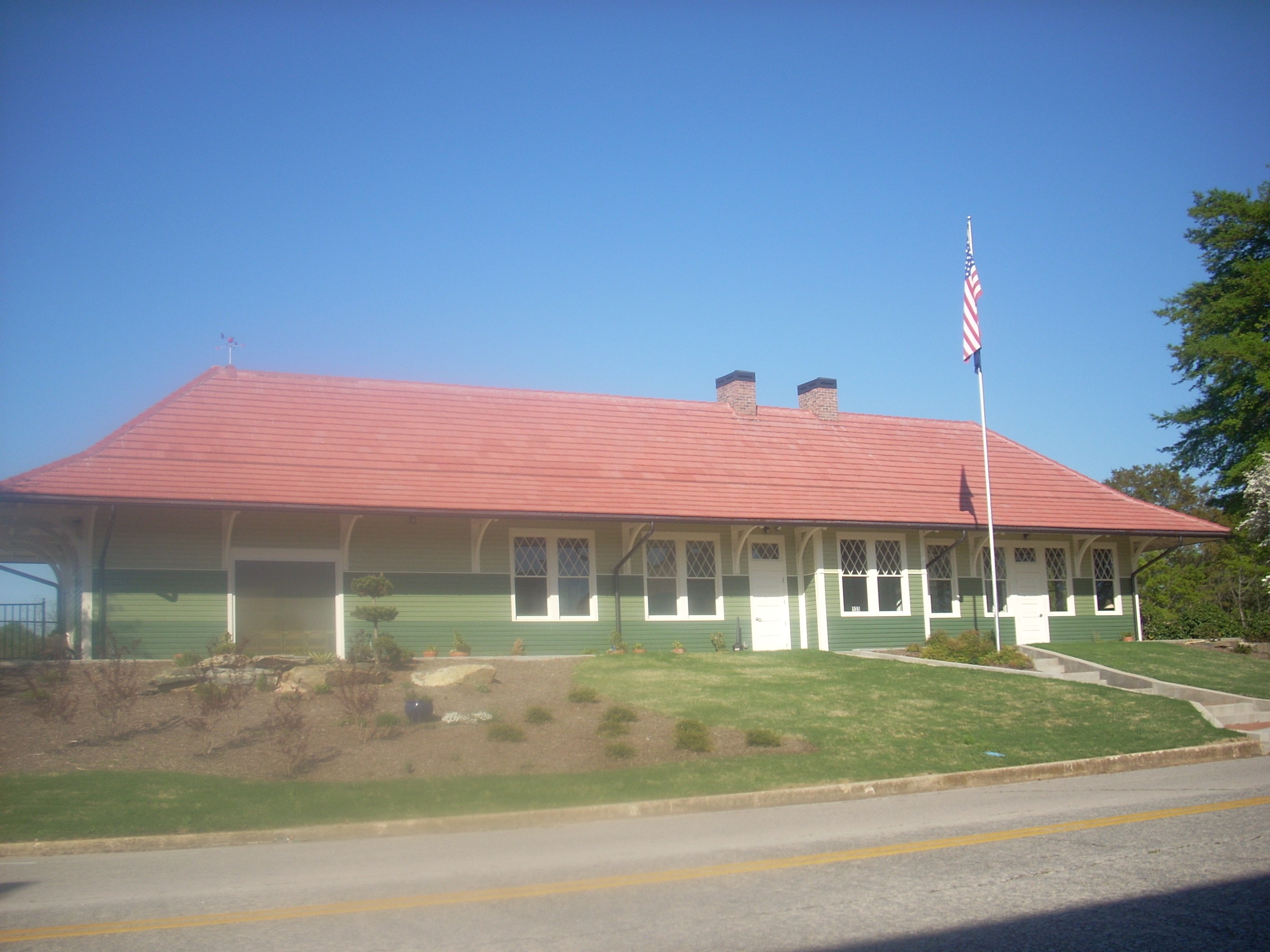
- Southern Railway Passenger Station in 2010 after restoration

- Location within South Carolina
- Location: 129 Main St. Westminster, South Carolina
- Coordinates: 34°39′57″N 83°5′46.5″W
- Built: ca. 1885
- NRHP reference No.: 76001707
- Added to NRHP: November 7, 1976

Southern Railway Passenger Station is railway passenger depot built ca. 1885 in Westminster, South Carolina. It is one of the oldest buildings in the community.

It was listed on the National Register of Historic Places in 1976.

== History ==
The Atlanta and Charlotte Air Line Railroad, a predecessor of the Southern Railway, was built in the early 1870s and Westminster was built along the railroad tracks. The station is believed to have been built about 1885. It has a rectangular plan with dimensions of 96 by 40 feet (29 m × 12 m). It has a deep hip roof. Built of wood, it was covered with asbestos siding in around 1940. It had two waiting rooms, an office, and a baggage room. It ceased being used as a passenger depot in 1969 when passenger service to the city was suspended.

It was converted into community uses such as a meeting room and a community health center. In 2006, it suffered damage in a fire. The station was rebuilt.

Preceding station	Southern Railway	Following station
Harbin toward Birmingham	Main Line	Richland toward Washington, D.C.
