= Old Pickens Presbyterian Church =

Historic church in South Carolina, United States

- U.S. National Register of Historic Places
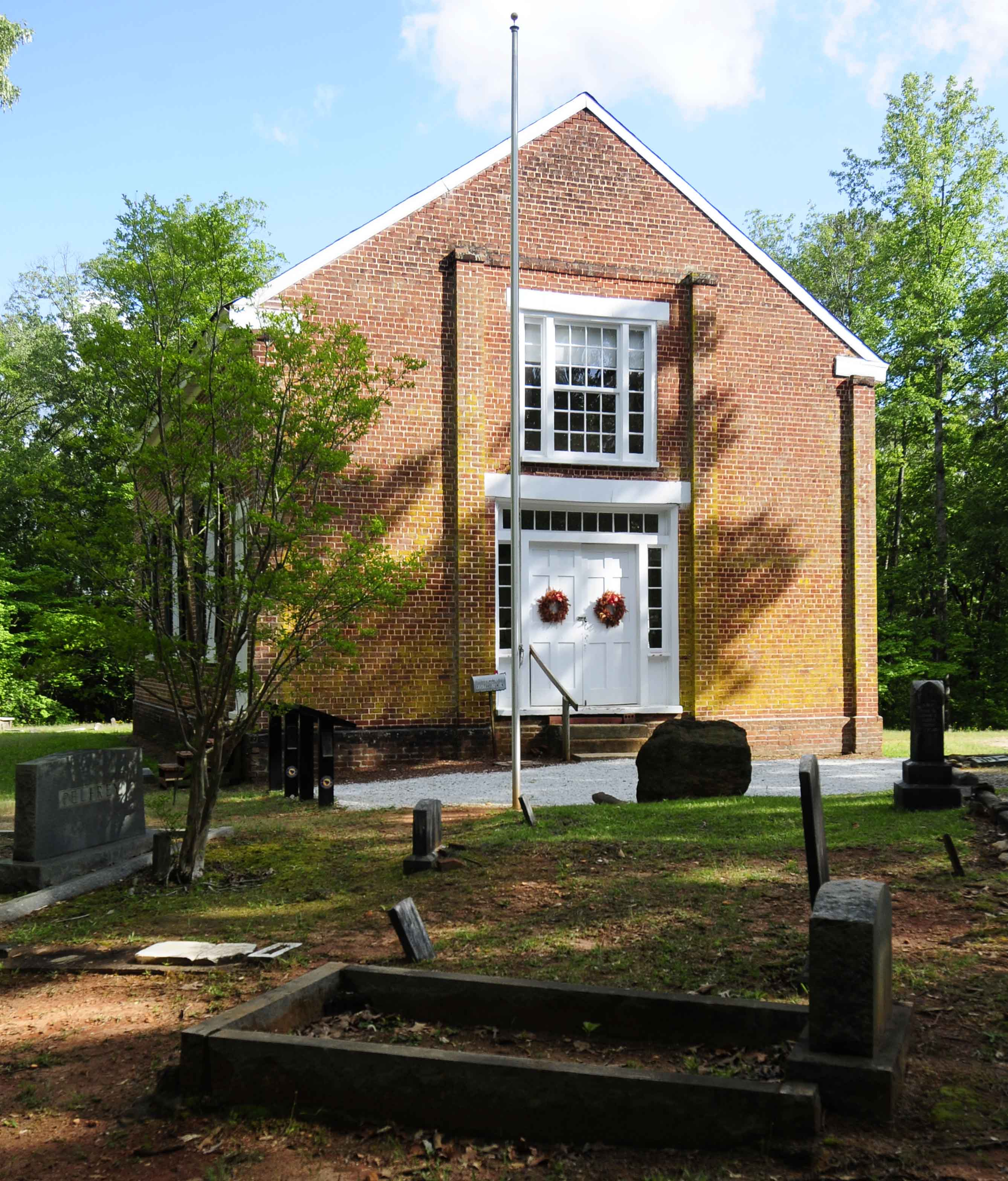

- Location within South Carolina Location within the United States
- Nearest city: Seneca, South Carolina
- Coordinates: 34°47′29″N 82°53′12″W
- Area: 6.7 acres (2.7 ha)
- Built: 1850
- Architectural style: Mid-19th Century
- NRHP reference No.: 96000380
- Added to NRHP: April 04, 1996

Old Pickens Presbyterian Church is a historic church in Seneca, South Carolina.

It was built in 1850 and added to the National Register in 1996.
