= Oconee County Jail =

- Formerly listed on the U.S. National Register of Historic Places
- Location within South Carolina Location within the United States
- Location: Short St., Walhalla, South Carolina
- Nearest city: Walhalla, South Carolina
- Coordinates: 34°45′53″N 83°4′6″W
- Area: less than one acre
- Built: 1901
- Demolished: ca. 1985
- MPS: Oconee County Penal System TR
- NRHP reference No.: 82001524

Significant dates
- Added to NRHP: November 14, 1982
- Removed from NRHP: December 12, 1989

The old Oconee County Jail was a former jail located on Short Street in Walhalla, South Carolina, in Oconee County. The jail was located on the grounds of the current Oconee County Courthouse. It was named to the National Register of Historic Places on November 14, 1982, along with the Oconee County Cage. At the time of its listing, the jail was one of the few remaining nineteenth or twentieth century jails in upper northwestern South Carolina. It was demolished around 1985. Subsequently, it was delisted on December 12, 1989.

== Early 20th-century county penal system ==
In the early twentieth century, county jails were primarily for holding individuals who were awaiting trial that could not afford bail. Male convicted prisoners were either sentenced to hard labor on the county chain gang or sent to the state penitentiary. In 1916, about 94% were in county chain gangs and about 6% were at the state penitentiary. In this period of racial segregation, white prisoners were separated from African-American prisoners.

Instead of being housed in the county jail, chain gangs were housed in cages, cars, or tents near the work site. The cages and cars could be used to also transport the convicts.

== History ==
Oconee County was formed in 1868 and Walhalla was made its county seat. In the next year, a contract was given to build a wooden jail. In 1901, the South Carolina General Assembly loaned Oconee County USD $12,000 to construct a new jail and for repairs and remodeling of the county courthouse.

A new location for the jail was chosen behind Main Street between Church and Tugaloo Streets. It was completed by at least 1906. It was used by the county sheriff and as a jail until 1978.

A report from a 1915 visit by the Board of Charities and Correction indicated that the average number of prisoners was 3.7. The white male prisoners were kept in a large room. African-American prisoners were kept in four cells. There was one room for female prisoners, but it was rarely occupied. Oconee County was one of the few in South Carolina that served three meals each day. The prisoners did practically no labor.

== Architecture ==
The jail was a two-story, stuccoed brick building with an asymmetrical plan. The building has been described as neomedieval or Gothic Revival style. The jail was very similar to one built in Anderson County that was designed by Frank P. Milburn.

The front section contains the sheriff's office and residence. It has a hip roof and three ells. The facade, which faces southwest, has a gabled ell on the left with a stepped parapet. This forward ell had a pair of one over one light windows at each level, and there was a multi-light attic window below the parapet. There was a one-story porch that extended across the front and around the left ell. This had a metal roof supported by grouped wooden columns.

There was a wing toward the right terminating in a polygonal bay with a crenellated parapet. There was a tall, stuccoed brick chimney at the junction of the main block and the bay. The bay had a one over one light window on each facet. On the right elevation, there was a one-story porch with an auxiliary entrance. Above this porch, there were three one over one lights.

On the left elevation, there were three bays with a tall, stuccoed brick chimney between the second and third bay. There was a one-story porch along the left elevation that abutted another projecting, gabled ell. The end of this ell had two one over one lights on each story and a multi-light window below a stepped parapet.

The interior of the building had an L-shaped hallway that led to the right and left elevations. There were four main rooms that had wooden floors, plaster walls and ceilings, and wooden window and door surrounds ornamented with routings.

The detention wing, added in 1939–1939 to replace the original detention wing, was a poured concrete building with a stucco finish. This had a flat roof with unadorned parapet. Metal-barred windows lit the corridors.

There was a steel door that connected the main building with the detention wing. The first floor of the detention facility has single and double cells on either side of a hallway. The second level had a large caged, bunk room with a shower and dining area.

Pictures of the jail are available.
