= Alexander–Hill House =

Historic house in South Carolina, United States

- U.S. National Register of Historic Places
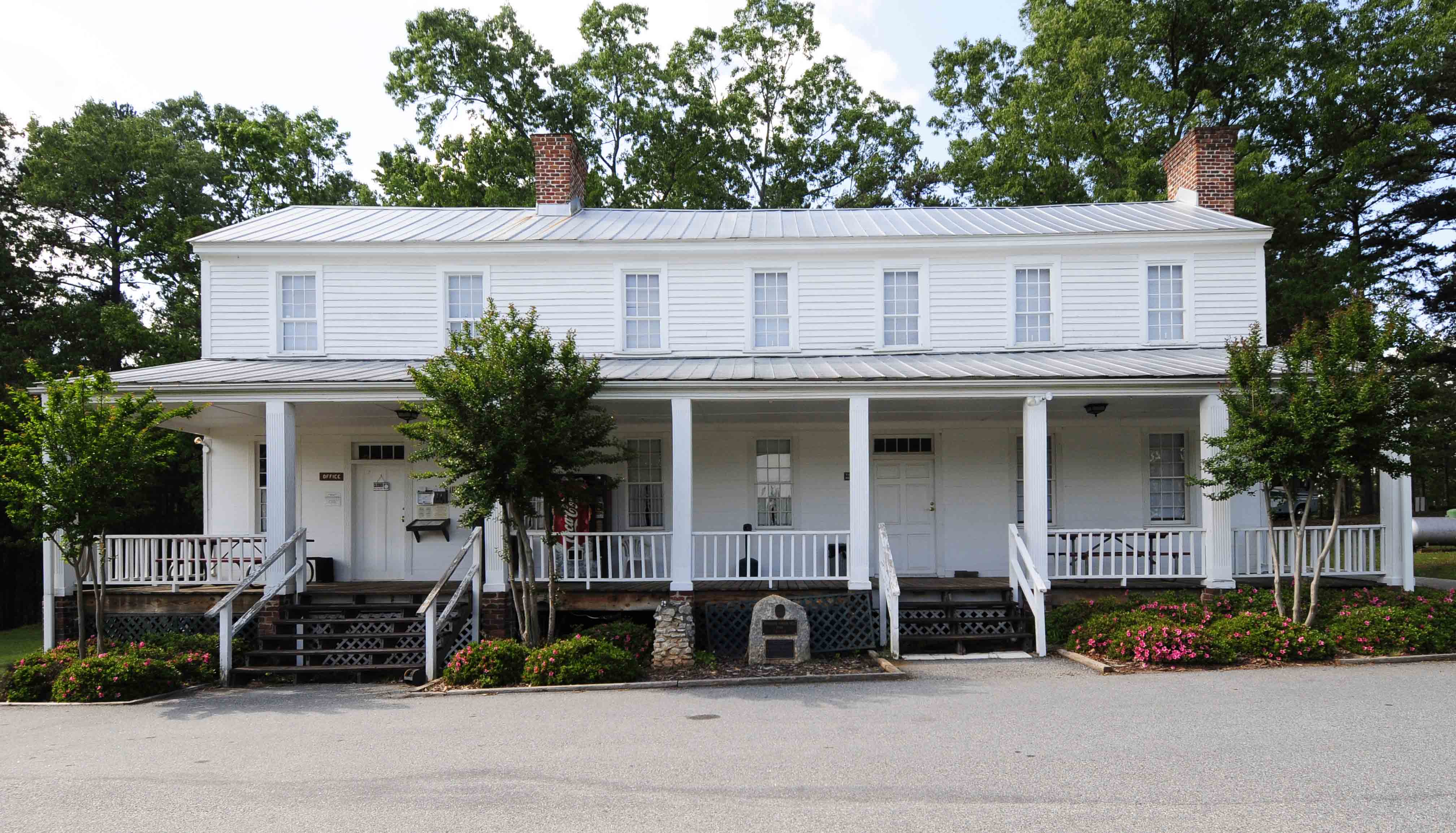
- Alexander–Hill House, 2012

- Location within South Carolina Location within the United States
- Nearest city: Seneca, South Carolina
- Coordinates: 34.795634°N 82.928976°W
- Area: 9.9 acres (4.0 ha)
- Built: 1831
- NRHP reference No.: 72001216
- Added to NRHP: July 24, 1972

The Alexander–Hill House, also known as the Alexander–Cannon–Hill House, is a property listed on the National Register of Historic Places, located in High Falls County Park near Seneca, South Carolina off of South Carolina Highway 183. Built in 1831 by Pleasant Alexander, the house was originally located on a plantation near Old Pickens, the government center of the Pickens District, which was created after the Pendleton District split into two smaller districts. It was moved to its current location in 1972.

The two-story clapboard house has original heart-pine floors in the entrance hall, wainscoting in the parlor and the original stairway. The two original brick chimneys were reassembled after the house was moved.

The house is currently used by the High Falls County Park as its office and gift shop. Tours of the house are available on a limited basis.
