= Faith Cabin Library =

Historical libraries in the U.S. South

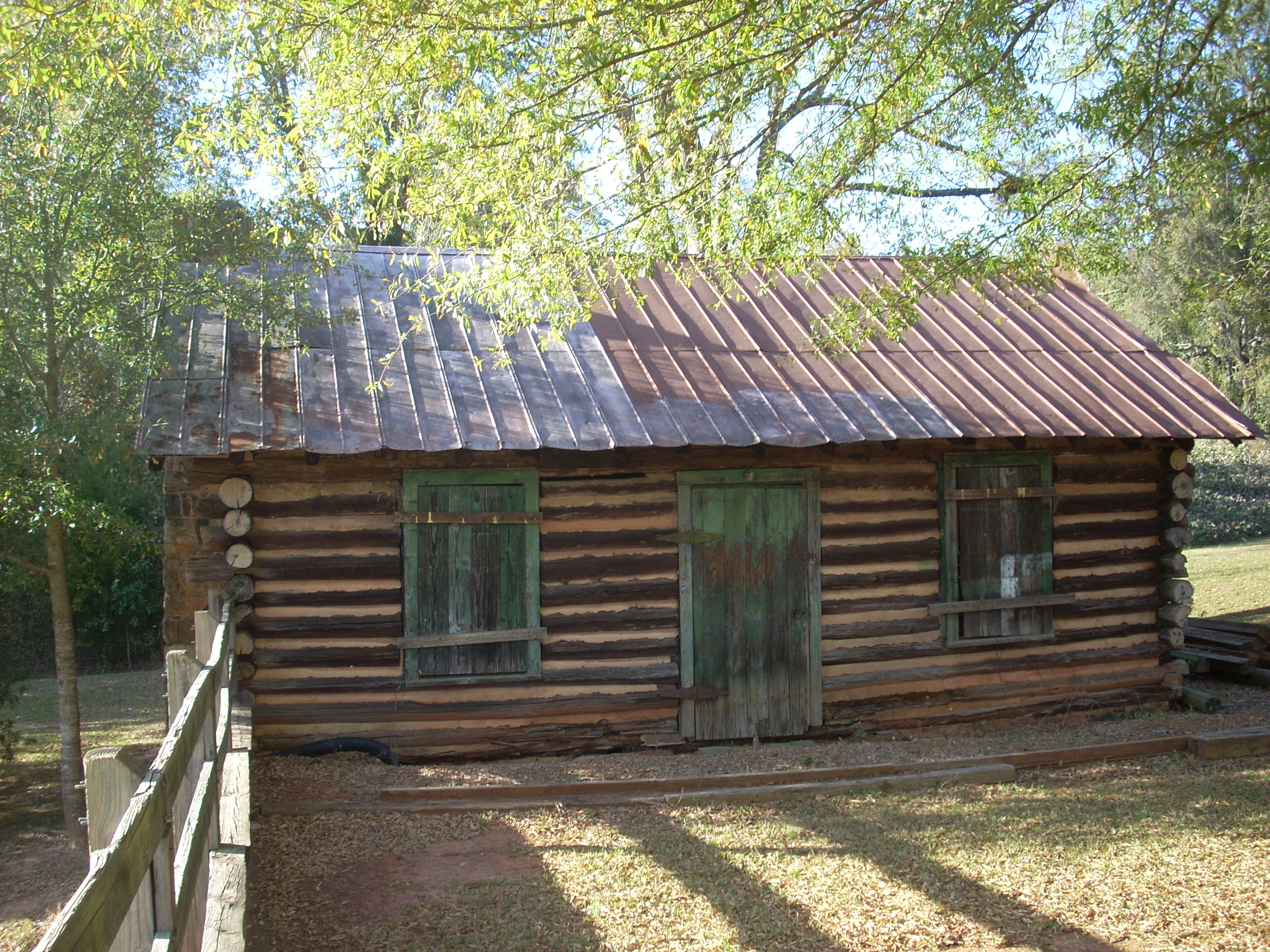
Faith Cabin Library, Pendleton, South Carolina

Faith Cabin Libraries were a system of libraries created in South Carolina and Georgia providing library services to Black Americans who were not allowed to use public libraries because of segregation laws.

== History ==
This library system was created in the 1930s and 1940s by Willie Lee Buffington, a White mill worker, and his childhood friend, a Black teacher Euriah Simpkins. Simpkins had invited Buffington to the opening of a Saluda County school for Black students. Buffington, surprised and upset by the lack of books in the school, began a letter-writing campaign to area churches soliciting book donations for his library project. However, there were too many books for the school itself, so Buffington and Simpkins decided to build a library themselves.

The first library--the Lizze Koon unit after Buffington's mother--a small free-standing log cabin building, opened in 1932 in Saluda County. It was 18 feet by 22 feet with a rock chimney. The building's furniture was barrels for chairs and kerosene lamps for illumination. At the library's opening, a community member said "we didn't have money, all we had was faith" which lent a name to both the building and the movement as Faith Cabin Libraries.

== Publicity ==
Simpkins' and Buffington's project spread throughout South Carolina and Georgia, through print publications such as Southern Workman and, later, publications such as Reader's Digest, the Saturday Evening Post and Library Journal. Buffington was active in publicity for the project, appearing on the Hobby Lobby radio program; his appearance helped raise enough money for a library in Lexington, South Carolina. Ted Malone profiled the movement in a 1948 radio broadcast. Buffington's life and the origin story of the movement was dramatized in 1951 in the Cavalcade of America radio series .

Buffington, who was on the faculty of Paine College, a Methodist college in Augusta, Georgia, created a slide collection with a script that could be used by Woman's Society of Christian Service of the Methodist Church to promote the movement. Buffington's salary for the project was being paid by divisions of the Methodist church by the early 1950s.

== South Carolina projects ==
The Works Progress Administration provided library services throughout the state of South Carolina between 1936 and 1943, however it was disproportionately providing services to White people. During the time the WPA provided library services to South Carolina, there were more Faith Cabin Libraries serving the Black population than WPA libraries. The State Library Board actively denied the existence and continued operation of Faith Cabin libraries in the early 1950s.

== Georgia projects ==
Buffington worked with Robert Cousins who was the director of Negro Education in Georgia, to identify communities who wanted Faith Cabin libraries. Assistance in curating and organizing book collections in libraries was provided by the Atlanta University Library School. Seventy-five Faith Cabin libraries were established in Georgia between 1944 and 1960, primarily in school buildings.

In total, there were twenty-nine Faith Cabin Libraries built in South Carolina and over seventy in Georgia. Each community was responsible for housing the book collection and operating their own library.

== Conclusion ==
In the 1950s and 1960s school consolidations eliminated many of the smaller schools with Faith Cabin collections, and public libraries were integrated by the mid-1960s. The library system remained active until the mid-1970s. The Faith Cabin Library at Paine College remained open and available until Buffington retired in 1975. There are three remaining free-standing Faith Cabin Library buildings, one in Pendleton, South Carolina, one in Saluda County, South Carolina and one in Seneca, South Carolina. The building in Seneca is being repurposed as a Black history museum.
