= Ram Cat Alley Historic District =

Historic district in South Carolina, United States

- U.S. National Register of Historic Places
- U.S. Historic district
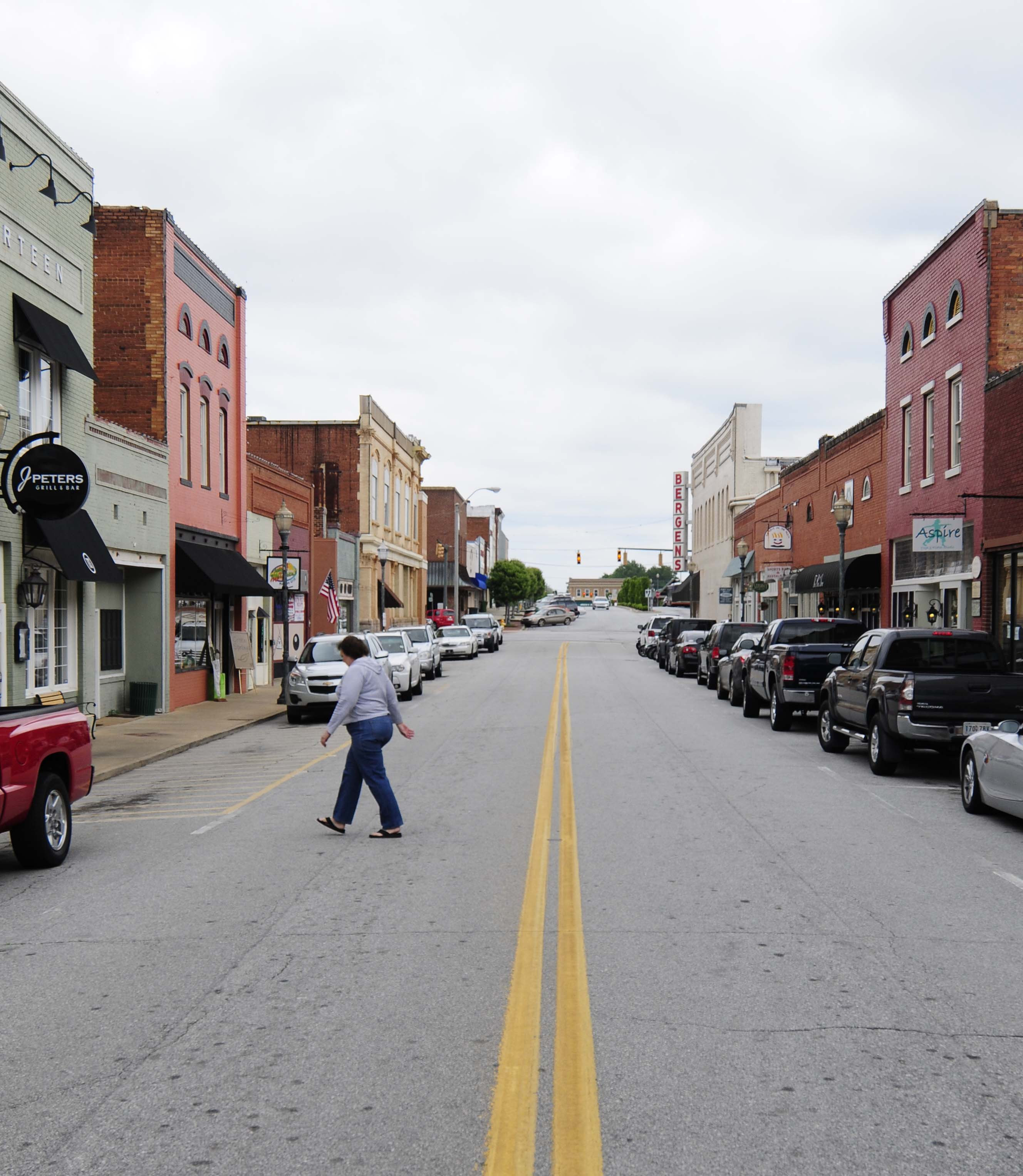
- Ram Cat Alley Historic District, April 2012

- Location within South Carolina Location within the United States
- Location: Ram Cat Alley and North Townville St., Seneca, South Carolina
- Coordinates: 34°41′06″N 82°57′09″W
- Area: 3 acres (1.2 ha)
- Architectural style: Late 19th And 20th Century Revivals
- NRHP reference No.: 00000289
- Added to NRHP: March 24, 2000

Ram Cat Alley Historic District is a national historic district located at Seneca, Oconee County, South Carolina. It encompasses 18 contributing buildings in the central business district of Seneca. They were built between about 1887 and 1930. Notable buildings include the Patterson Building, Harper and Jones Building, C. F. Adams General Store, Old Seneca Post Office, and Richardson Theatre.

It was added to the National Register of Historic Places in 2000. The application was compiled and submitted by Chris Knopf, a Clemson University Graduate Student, and Walter Scharer, then Planning Director for Seneca, South Carolina. Knopf is now County Manager for Surry County, North Carolina, and Scharer is Planning Director for Shelby, North Carolina.
