= Mountain Rest, South Carolina =

Unincorporated community in South Carolina, US

Mountain Rest
- Unincorporated community
- Location within the state of South Carolina
- Coordinates: 34°52′09″N 83°09′17″W
- Country: United States
- State: South Carolina
- County: Oconee
- Elevation: 1,713 ft (522 m)
- Time zone: Eastern (EST)
  - Summer (DST): EDT
- ZIP codes: 29664
- Area code: 864
- GNIS feature ID: 1938354

Mountain Rest or Mountain Rest Division is an unincorporated community near the Chattooga River in northwestern Oconee County, South Carolina. The community is on South Carolina Highway 28 adjacent to a lake on Taylor Creek. The ZIP Code for Mountain Rest is 29664.

The Oconee State Park Historic District and Russell House are listed on the National Register of Historic Places.
