= Seneca, South Carolina =

City in Oconee County, South Carolina

- City
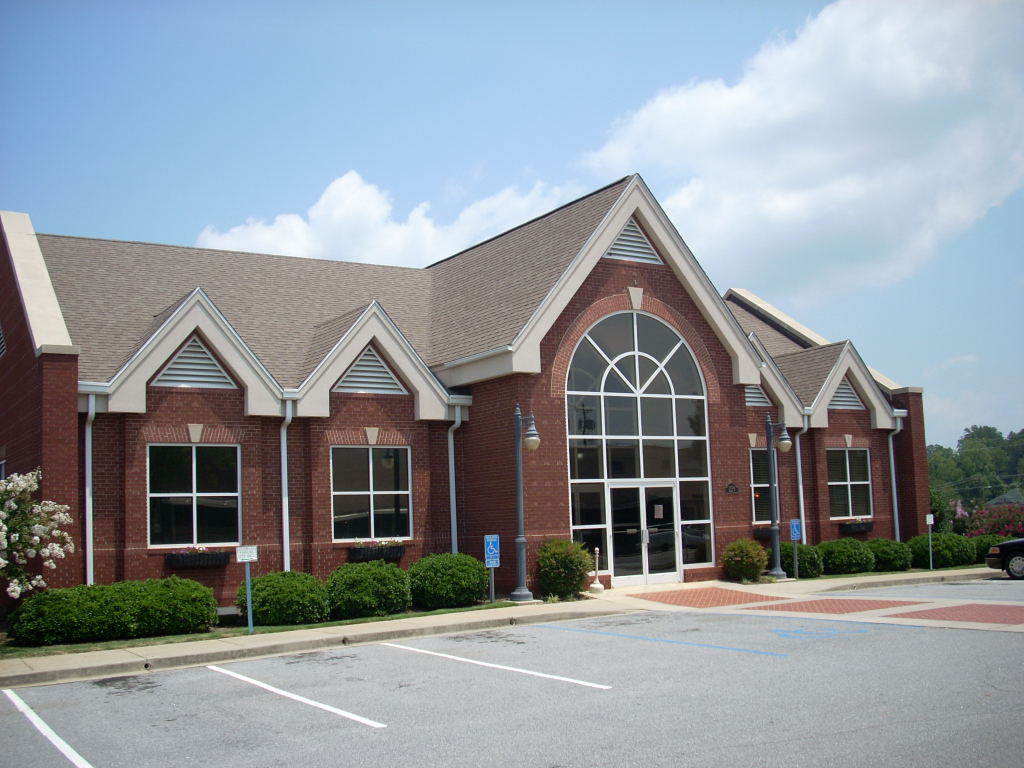
- Seneca City Hall

- Flag Seal
- Motto: "City of Smiles, City with Style"
- Location in Oconee County and the state of South Carolina.
- Coordinates: 34°40′55″N 82°57′36″W
- Country: United States
- State: South Carolina
- County: Oconee

Area
  - Total: 8.30 sq mi (21.49 km^{2})
  - Land: 8.24 sq mi (21.35 km^{2})
  - Water: 0.054 sq mi (0.14 km^{2})
- Elevation: 915 ft (279 m)

Population (2020)
  - Total: 8,850
  - Density: 1,073.7/sq mi (414.55/km^{2})
- Time zone: UTC−5 (Eastern (EST))
  - Summer (DST): UTC−4 (EDT)
- ZIP codes: 29672, 29678, 29679
- Area codes: 864, 821
- FIPS code: 45-65095
- GNIS feature ID: 2405444
- Website: www.seneca.sc.us

Seneca is a city in Oconee County, South Carolina, United States. As of the 2020 census, Seneca had a population of 8,850. It is the principal city of the Seneca Micropolitan Statistical Area, which includes all of Oconee County, and is part of the greater Greenville-Spartanburg-Anderson, South Carolina Combined Statistical Area. Seneca was named for the nearby Cherokee town of Isunigu, which English colonists knew as "Seneca Town".

== History ==
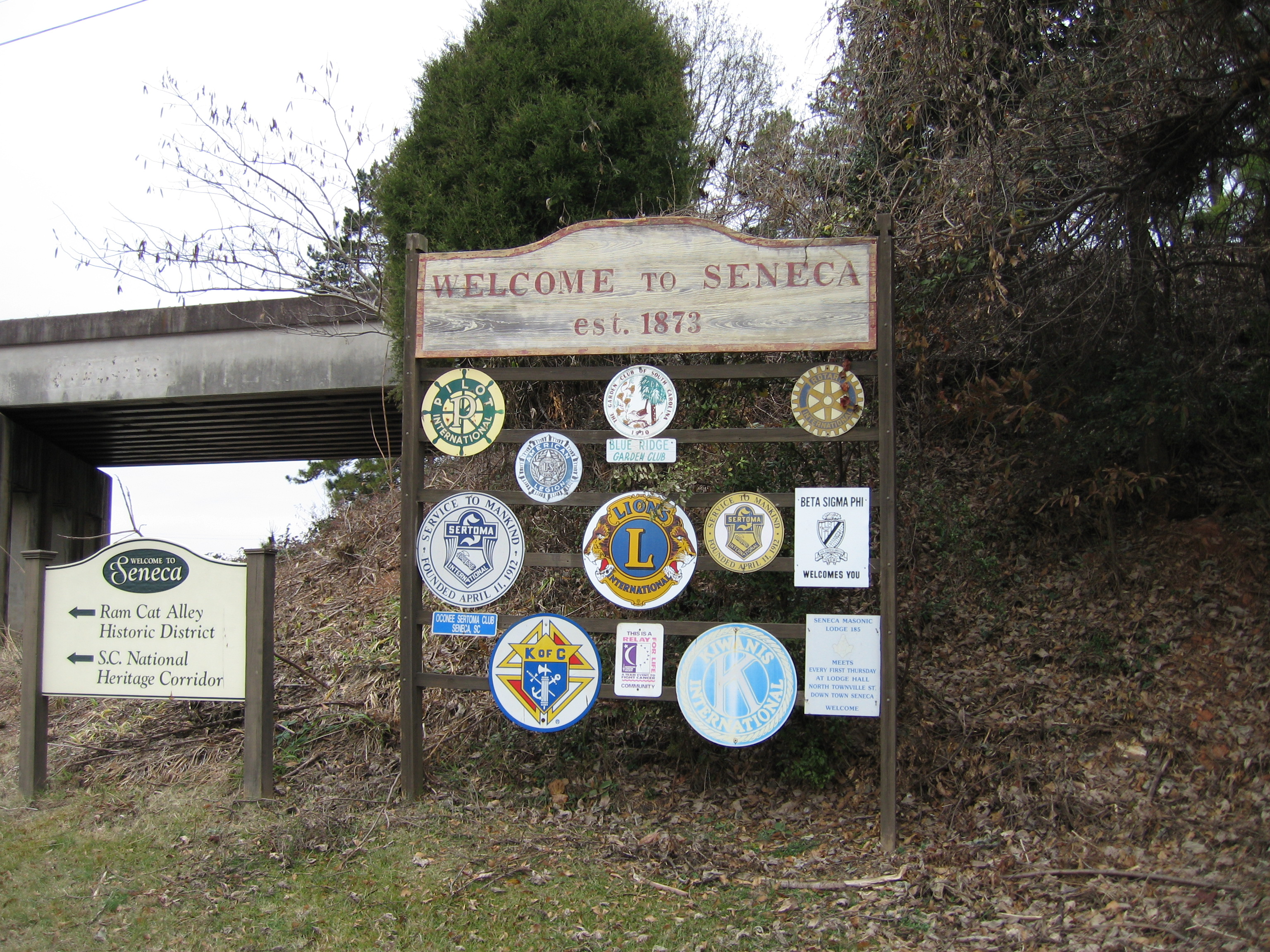
Welcome sign

In the antebellum period, this area was part of the Pickens District, South Carolina. The state had used jurisdictions such as parish, county, district, and county again in its history. Oconee County was not organized until 1868, after the American Civil War.

Seneca was founded in 1873, during the Reconstruction era, as the railroad town "Seneca City", named for the Seneca River and a historic Cherokee town known as Isunigu. It was called Seneca in a kind of transliteration by British colonists.

Seneca City was developed at the intersection of the Blue Ridge Railroad and the newly built Atlanta and Charlotte Air Line Railroad. Both lines are now part of the Norfolk Southern Railway. A. W. Thompson and J. J. Norton, who were locating engineers for the Air Line Railroad, purchased the land from Col. Brown of Anderson, South Carolina, also in the large Pickens District. A stake marking the center of town was driven into the ground at the intersection of the railroad tracks and the current Townville Street. The land was divided into lots for a one-half mile from the stake. An auction was held on August 14, 1873. The town was given a charter by the state legislature on March 14, 1874. In 1908, the name was changed to the shorter Seneca.

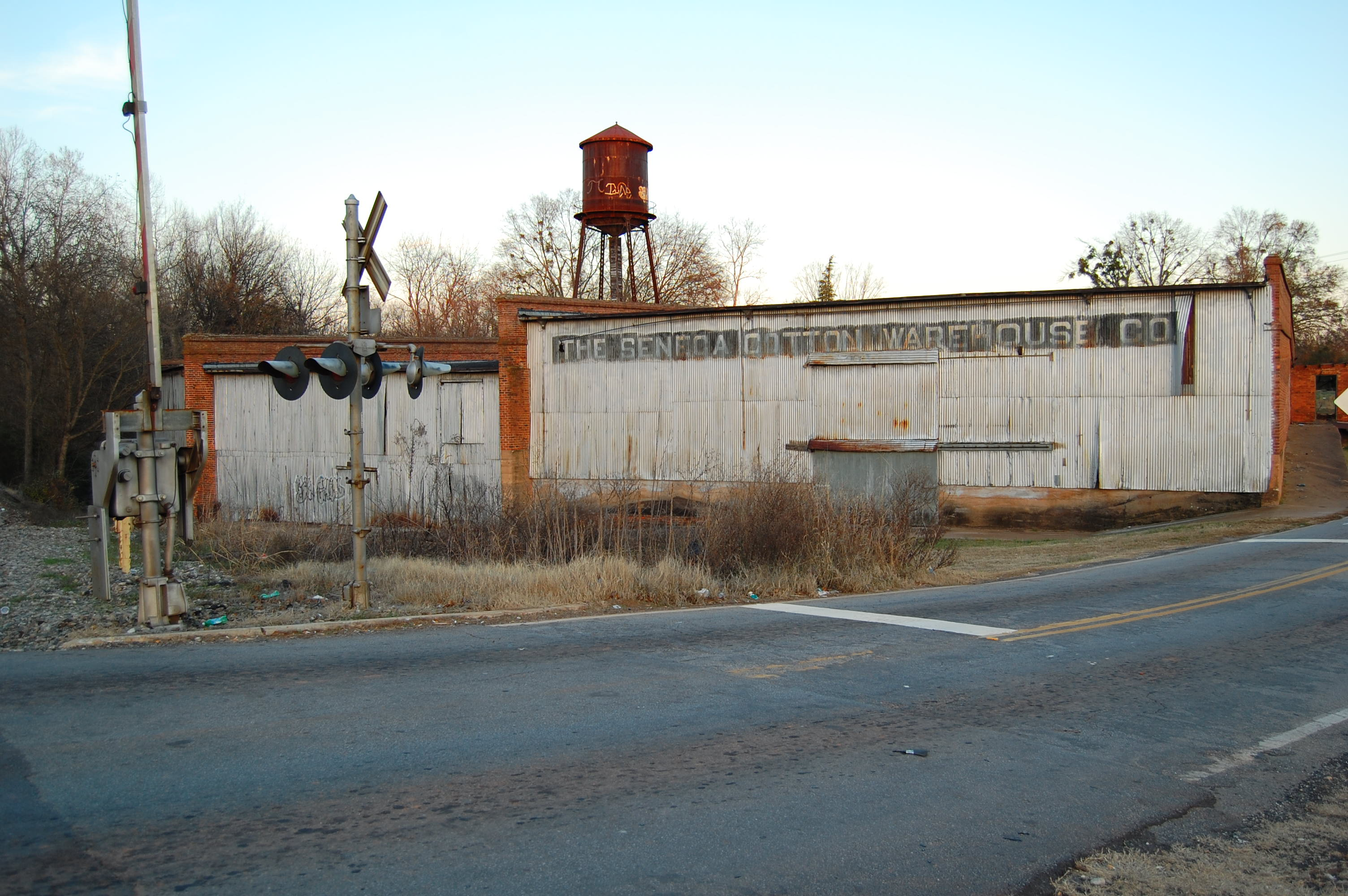
Old Cotton Warehouse. The right hand section of the warehouse burned in April 2008 and has been torn down.

Seneca developed as a marketing and shipping point for cotton, the major commodity crop in this uplands area. During the harvest, wagons bringing cotton would line up for blocks from the railroad station. A passenger terminal, several hotels, and a park were built near the railroad tracks. Recently, this park was named the Norton-Thompson Park in honor of the city's founders.

The first school was built in 1874. The community also was home of the Seneca Institute - Seneca Junior College, established here in 1899 as an historically black college. It was reserved for African-American students until 1939.

Westpoint Stevens Plant, January 2008. Demolition of the mill began in the spring of 2008.

Textile mills were built in the area; a plant-and-mill village was built in 1893 by the Courtenay Manufacturing Company in Newry on the Little River, which supplied hydropower for the mill. W.L. Jordon built another textile plant and mill village east of Seneca. This village has been called Jordania, Londsdale, and Utica; these changes accompanied changes in ownership of the plant. The J. P. Stevens Plant, which was later called the Westpoint Stevens Plant, was a large textile mill built on Lake Hartwell. Its workforce was integrated, unlike most other plants that hired only whites. Many other textile mills were developed in this area. These plants were the main industry for Seneca for the first half of the twentieth century. With the shift of these jobs overseas, these textile mills are now closed.

In the late 20th century, major dam projects were constructed n the Keowee and other local rivers, to support recreation and public utilities. These projects created three major lakes: Lake Hartwell in 1963, Lake Keowee in 1971, and Lake Jocassee in 1974, stimulating development in Seneca and the region. Duke Power's Oconee Nuclear Station was built on Lake Keowee, drawing cooling water for its operations from the lake.

The recreation provided by the lakes, and other attractions, such as nearby Clemson University attracted many retirees from other parts of the country. Retirement communities have been built in the area. Concerned about over-development, some residents formed the Friends of Lake Keowee Society (FOLKS) to advocate for balance.

Early on April 13, 2020, a high-end EF3 tornado struck residential areas south and east of Seneca. Many buildings were damaged or destroyed and one person was killed.

== National Register of Historic Places listings ==
In and around Seneca, there are a number of historic buildings and districts that are on the National Register of Historic Places:

- Seneca Historic District was listed in 1974. It is located south of the railroad tracks. The district consists of several homes and three churches that were built in the late nineteenth and early twentieth centuries. The houses have architectural styles that were popular in the period. It also includes a log cabin from the mid-nineteenth century that was moved from Long Creek, South Carolina. The South Carolina Department of Archives and History has additional pictures and information, copies of the nomination forms, and a map of the district.
- Ram Cat Alley Historic District was listed in 2000. It is a twenty-one-building commercial district built in the 1880s to the 1930s. The name of the street came from cats that gathered around a meat market. Many of these buildings have been rejuvenated and now house restaurants, shops, and professional offices. The South Carolina Department of Archives and History has additional pictures and information, a copy of the nomination form, and a map.
- Newry Historic District was listed in 1982. It is a historic textile mill village near Seneca. The South Carolina Department of Archives and History has additional pictures and information, a copy of the nomination form, and a map.
- Alexander-Hill House
- Faith Cabin Library at Seneca Junior College
- McPhail Angus Farm
- Old Pickens Presbyterian Church

== Geography ==
According to the United States Census Bureau, the city has a total area of 7.1 square miles (18 km^{2}), of which 7.1 square miles (18 km^{2}) is land and 0.04 square miles (0.10 km^{2}) (0.56%) is water.

== Demographics ==
Historical population
Census	Pop.	Note	%±
1880	382		—
1900	920		—
1910	1,313		42.7%
1920	1,460		11.2%
1930	1,929		32.1%
1940	2,155		11.7%
1950	3,649		69.3%
1960	5,227		43.2%
1970	6,027		15.3%
1980	7,436		23.4%
1990	7,726		3.9%
2000	7,652		−1.0%
2010	8,102		5.9%
2020	8,850		9.2%
2025 (est.)	9,424	▲	6.5%
U.S. Decennial Census; 2020

=== 2020 census ===
As of the 2020 census, Seneca had a population of 8,850. The median age was 41.9 years. 21.9% of residents were under the age of 18 and 22.3% of residents were 65 years of age or older. For every 100 females there were 84.0 males, and for every 100 females age 18 and over there were 80.5 males age 18 and over.

As of the 2020 census, 96.9% of residents lived in urban areas, while 3.1% lived in rural areas.

As of the 2020 census, there were 3,893 households and 2,138 families in Seneca. Of the households, 27.5% had children under the age of 18 living in them, 37.3% were married-couple households, 18.6% were households with a male householder and no spouse or partner present, and 38.8% were households with a female householder and no spouse or partner present. About 34.8% of all households were made up of individuals and 16.5% had someone living alone who was 65 years of age or older.

As of the 2020 census, there were 4,417 housing units, of which 11.9% were vacant. The homeowner vacancy rate was 2.5% and the rental vacancy rate was 9.2%.

Racial composition as of the 2020 census
Race	Number	Percent
White	5,681	64.2%
Black or African American	2,172	24.5%
American Indian and Alaska Native	37	0.4%
Asian	108	1.2%
Native Hawaiian and Other Pacific Islander	3	0.0%
Some other race	244	2.8%
Two or more races	605	6.8%
Hispanic or Latino (of any race)	531	6.0%

=== 2000 census ===
As of the census of 2000, there were 7,652 people, 3,286 households, and 2,096 families residing in the city. The population density was 1,084.6 inhabitants per square mile (418.8/km^{2}). There were 3,677 housing units at an average density of 521.2 per square mile (201.2/km^{2}). The racial makeup of the city was 63.32% White, 33.77% African American, 0.31% Native American, 0.63% Asian, 0.01% Pacific Islander, 0.65% from other races, and 1.31% from two or more races. Hispanic or Latino of any race were 1.53% of the population.

There were 3,286 households, out of which 27.4% had children under the age of 18 living with them, 42.2% were married couples living together, 17.5% had a female householder with no husband present, and 36.2% were non-families. Of all households 32.3% were made up of individuals, and 13.2% had someone living alone who was 65 years of age or older. The average household size was 2.32 and the average family size was 2.93.

In the city, the population was spread out, with 24.4% under the age of 18, 9.5% from 18 to 24, 25.3% from 25 to 44, 24.7% from 45 to 64, and 16.0% who were 65 years of age or older. The median age was 38 years. For every 100 females, there were 87.5 males. For every 100 females age 18 and over, there were 83.0 males.

The median income for a household in the city was $32,643, and the median income for a family was $44,487. Males had a median income of $31,381 versus $21,472 for females. The per capita income for the city was $18,498. About 13.0% of families and 15.6% of the population were below the poverty line, including 23.0% of those under age 18 and 16.4% of those age 65 or over.

== Government ==
Seneca City Hall is located on North First Street, in the center of the historic (downtown) area of Seneca. North First Street is also marked as Highway 123 Business. The City Hall Complex holds the Seneca Police Dept, Seneca Light and Water, as well as the offices of the Mayor and City Administrator.

Seneca Fire Department is housed on West South Fourth Street, in a new complex. The Fire House is just across the street from the Shaver Complex, which comprises the Shaver Civic Center, sports fields for the Seneca Recreation Department, a park for smaller children, and a rubberized soft walking track.

== Education ==
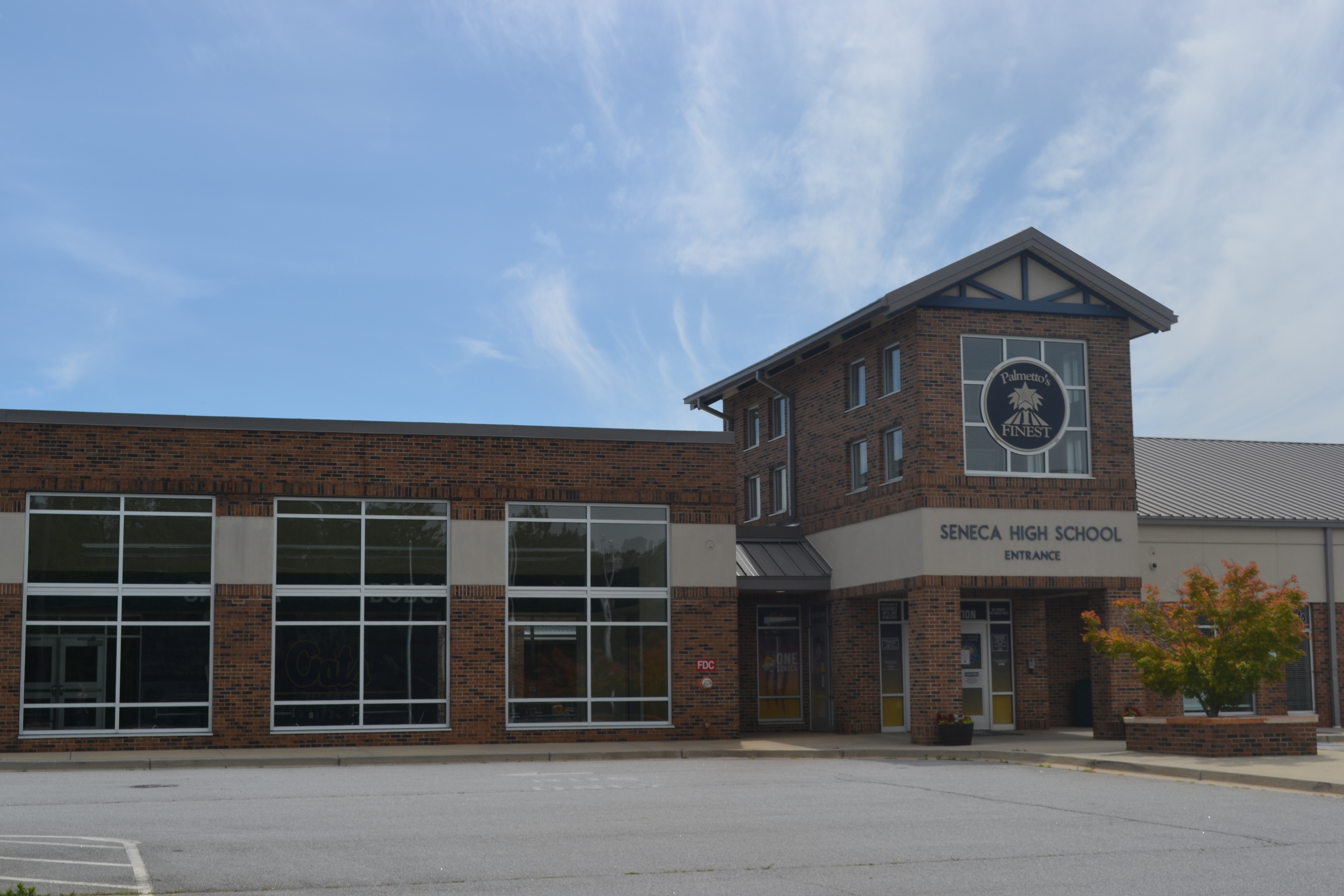
Seneca High School

There is one school district in the county: Oconee County School District.

Schools include:

- Blue Ridge Elementary School
- Northside Elementary School
- Seneca Middle School
- Seneca High School

Keowee Elementary School and Ravenel Elementary School have Seneca postal addresses but are away from the city limits.

Seneca has a lending library, a branch of the Oconee County Public Library.

Until June 2020, it was the headquarters of the National Council of Examiners for Engineering and Surveying (NCEES), the council that deals with the examination for engineers and surveyors. On that date, the NCEES moved to Greenville, South Carolina.

== Notable people ==
- Willie Aikens, Major League Baseball player
- Bennie Cunningham, National Football League player
- John Edwards, U.S. Senator from North Carolina
- Darline Graham, U.S. Senator from South Carolina
- Lindsey Graham, U.S. Senator from South Carolina
- Clarence Kay, National Football League player
- Needtobreathe, Christian rock band
- Jimmy Orr, All-Pro National Football League player
- Marshall Parker, politician
- Marv Rackley, Major League Baseball player

== See also ==
- Killing of Zachary Hammond
