= Gorges State Park =

State park in North Carolina, United States

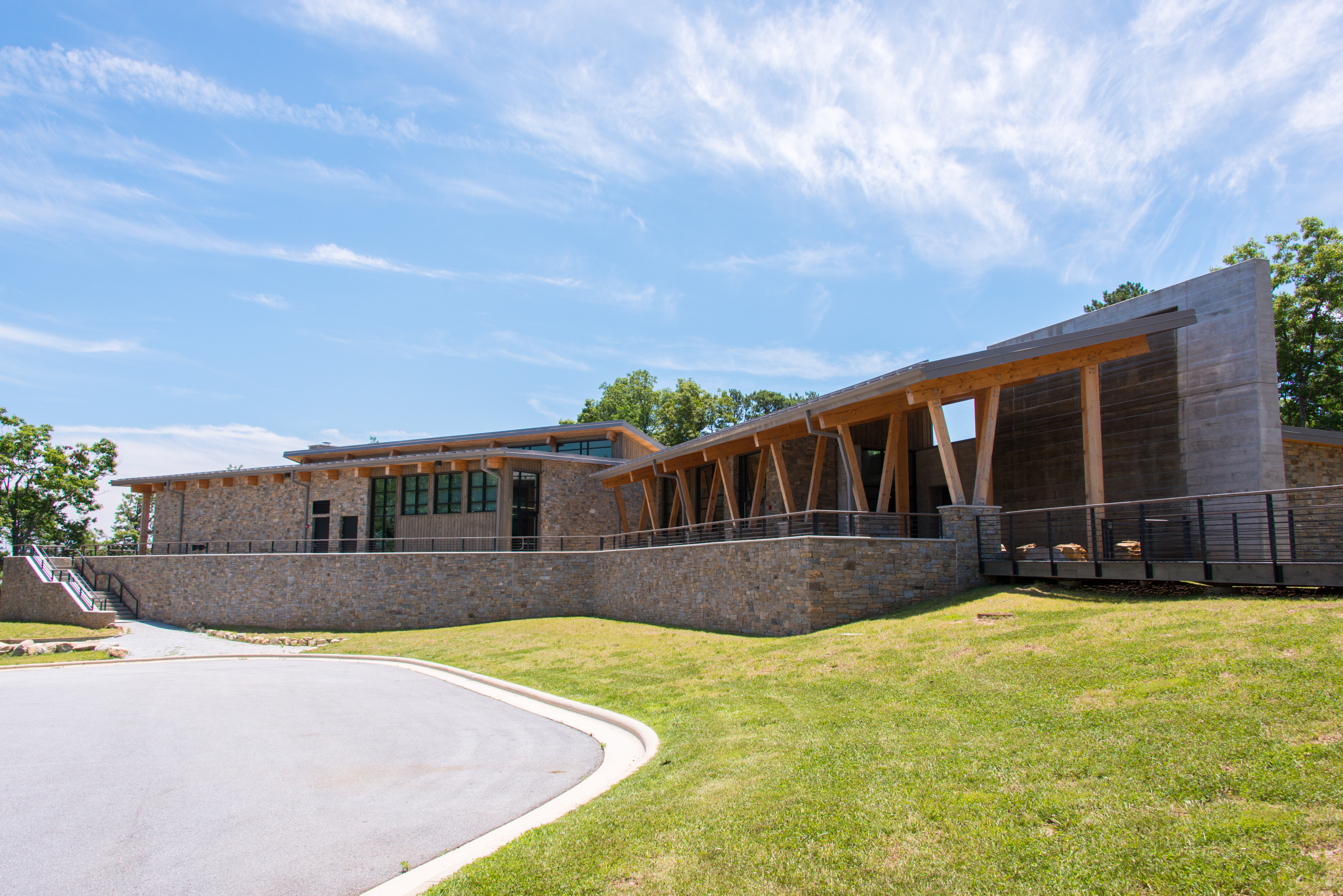
- Visitor Center

- Location within North Carolina Location within the United States
- Interactive map of Gorges State Park
- Location: Transylvania County, North Carolina, United States
- Coordinates: 35°05′49″N 82°57′08″W
- Area: 7,709 acres (3,120 ha)
- Elevation: 1,900 ft (580 m)
- Established: 1999
- Administrator: North Carolina Division of Parks and Recreation
- Website: Official website

Gorges State Park is a 7,709-acre (31.20 km^{2}) North Carolina state park in Transylvania County, North Carolina in the United States and along with other conservation lands is part of a 100,000+ acre conservation corridor stretching some 80 miles along the NC/SC state line. The land, along Jocassee Gorges, was purchased by the state from Duke Energy Corporation in 1999. It is North Carolina's westernmost state park and one of the state's newest. The park is adjacent to part of the Pisgah National Forest and the N.C. Wildlife Resources Commission's Toxaway Game Land. Gorges State Park provides the principal access to the Horsepasture River on these adjoining public lands.

== History ==
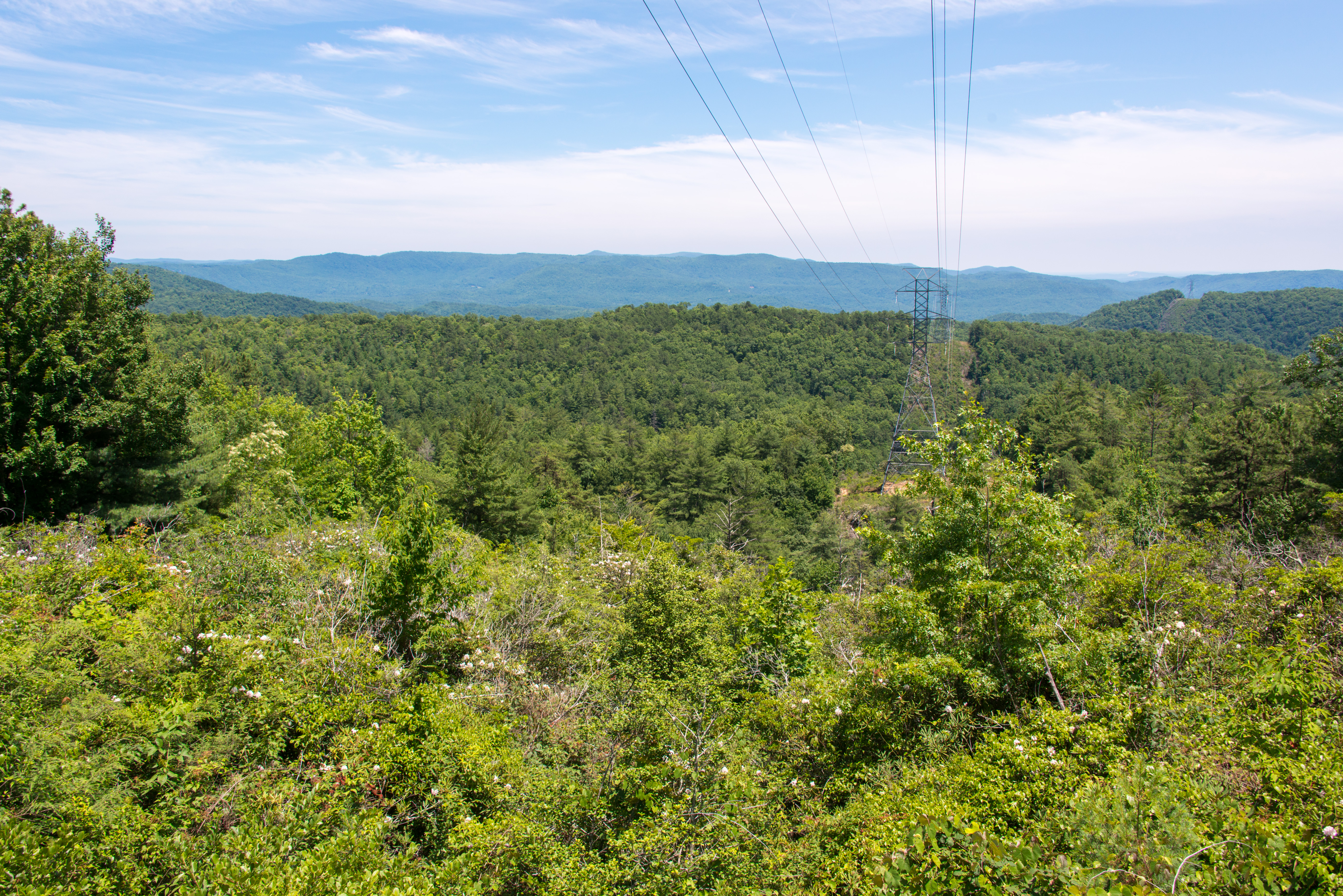
Duke Energy power lines cut through along Grassy Ridge

One of the most damaging interferences to the Gorges environment occurred in 1916 when the dam containing Lake Toxaway broke. Record amounts of water gushed southward down the Toxaway River, destroying the communities in its path, scouring the gorges and leaving piles of debris 15 to 20 feet (6.1 m) high.

Following the flood, local citizens eventually sold large land tracts in the Gorges to Singer Sewing Machine Company, which logged most of the land. Then, in the 1940s and 1950s, Singer sold the land to Duke Energy Corporation. The corporation purchased the land for its steep topography and high rainfall, which offered opportunities for development of hydropower projects.

Conservation studies, in Jocassee Gorge, began in the late 1970s. In the late 1990s, Duke Energy decided that it no longer needed large portions of the Gorges for future hydropower and offered the land for sale to natural resources agencies in North and South Carolina. The NC Division of Parks and Recreation stepped up to create the state park in 1999 with the support of local citizens and the North Carolina General Assembly, and land of Park now stands as a second growth forest.

== Recreation ==
Gorges State Park is open for year-round recreation, including, camping, hiking, mountain biking, and fishing. Primitive camping is available in several different natural environments. The Ray Fisher Place campground was closed in 2020 and a new campground with 16 tent sites, 13 RV sites and 5 Camper Cabins was opened in November 2022. Each RV site has sewer and electrical hookups and all sites have a fire ring, picnic table and lantern hook. It was a hike-in campground with six primitive campsites, each with a picnic table, fire ring and lantern hook, and it was a 0.75-mile (1.21 km) hike from the Rainbow Falls Trail-head. Another camping area is near the shores of Lake Jocassee, along the Foothills Trail. These campsites are also primitive and hike-in. Dispersed camping is also permitted in the adjoining Pisgah National Forest, and backpackers may register and leave their vehicles in the park. Lake Jocassee is a deep man made lake which forms much of the park's southern boundary, and it is open to trout and bass fishing. The streams of Gorges State Park are all designated Wild Trout Waters. Many miles of trails are open to hiking, mountain biking and horseback riding.

The Grassy Ridge Access off North Carolina Highway 281 in Sapphire is the park's primary access. This area is most well known for providing the principle access to Rainbow Falls and Turtleback Falls on the Horsepasture River. These falls are in the Pisgah National Forest, but it is not uncommon for visitors to mistakenly think the falls are inside the park because the park provides the only easy, legal access to them. Upper Bearwallow Falls is located in the access area, and it currently is the only waterfall in the park with a maintained trail leading to it.

The Frozen Creek Access off Frozen Creek Road in Rosman is the park's secondary access, and the park's longest trails are reached from it. Both the Auger Hole and Cane Break trails start at the access, and they end at different points along the Foothills Trail. The Auger Hole Trail is the park's only multi-use trail and it is open to hikers, horse-back riders, and mountain bicyclists.

== Temperate rain forest ==
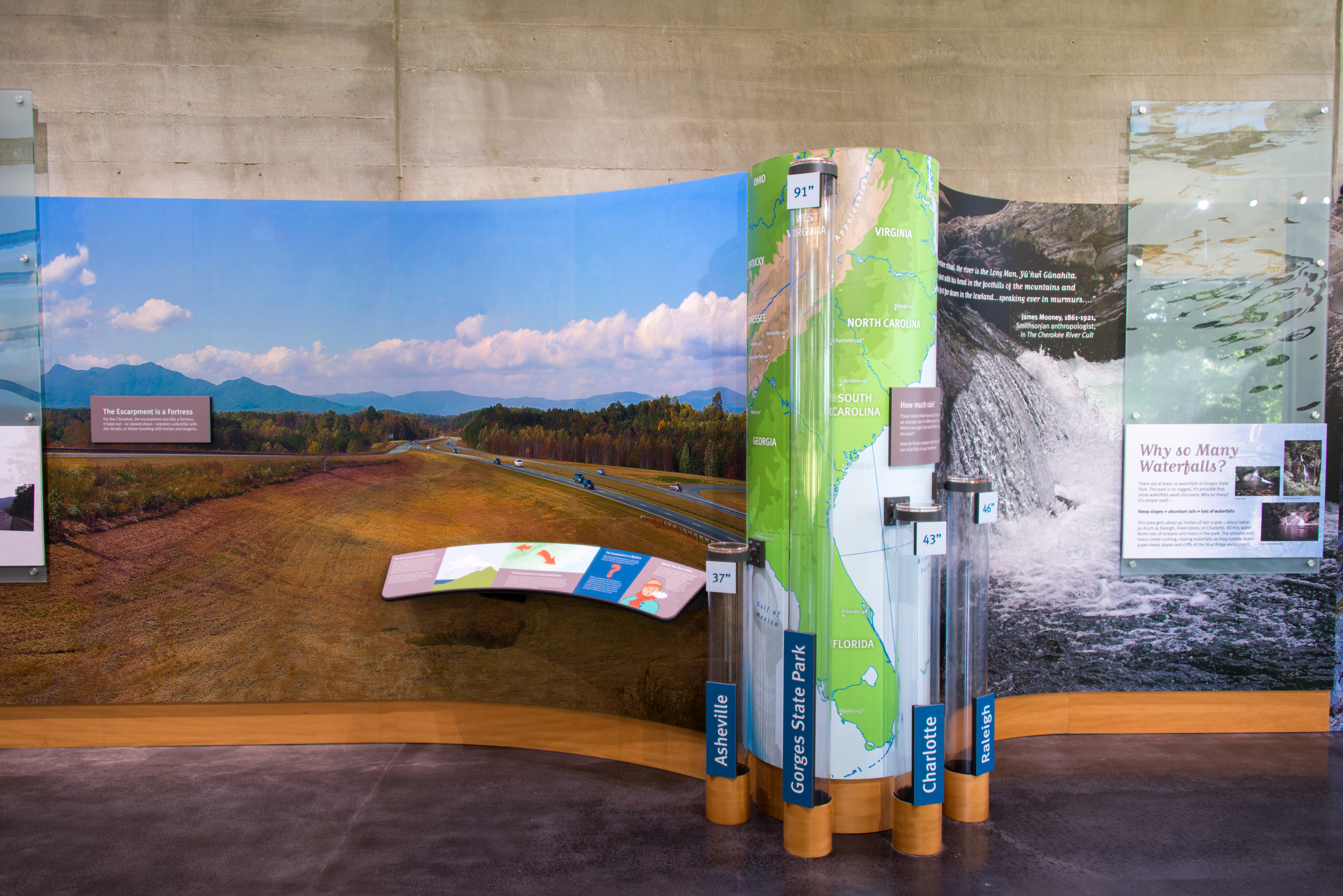
Rainfall and sciences at the park

The average yearly rainfall at Gorges State Park is over 91 inches (2,300 mm) creating a temperate rain forest. The rainfall is a result of orographic lift which occurs when an air mass is forced from a low elevation to a higher elevation as it moves over rising terrain. The land at Gorges State Park rises over 2,000 feet (610 m) in just over 3 miles (4.8 km). As the air mass gains altitude it expands and cools adiabatically. This cooler air cannot hold the moisture as well as warm air can, which effectively raises the relative humidity to 100%, creating clouds and frequent precipitation and heavy rain.

== Ecology ==
Gorges State Park is home to a wide variety of habitats due to its differing geologic formations, elevation, and climate. It is located between the Tennessee Valley/Gulf of Mexico and the Savannah River/Atlantic Ocean drainage basins. Five streams flowing through Gorges State Park carry water over the Blue Ridge Escarpment, gradually at first, before plummeting over waterfalls into a series of gorges.

Gorges State Park is home to roughly 125 rare plant and animal species and 12 endangered or threatened plant and animal species. Many of these rare plants species would typically be found only in the tropic regions of the world. Scientists are unsure of how these plants, including Pringle's aquatic moss and Carolina star-moss, have come to grow in the Appalachian Mountains far from their usual homes. Some scientists believe that spores blew in from the tropics. Others think that the species have remained from a time period when the surrounding area was much warmer.

Gorges State Park is also home to an abundance of plant and wildlife that is more typical to the southern Appalachians. Plant species include, mountain laurel, rhododendron, white pine, red oak, and hickories. Oconee bells are very rare flowering plants are abundant in the gorges of the park. These flowers are endangered and populations of the plant have been found.

The most common animal species of Gorges State Park are white-tailed deer, black bear, wild turkey, coyote, fox, and wild boar. The park is also home to North Carolina's largest known population of green salamanders. The rare Swainson's warbler and three rare fish, the turquoise darter, rosyface chub and redeye bass are found in Gorges State Park as well.

== See also ==
- Drift Falls
- Horsepasture River
- Turtleback Falls
- Rainbow Falls
