= South Carolina Highway 130 =

State highway in South Carolina, United States

South Carolina Highway 130

Route information
- Maintained by SCDOT
- Length: 30.072 mi (48.396 km)
- Existed: 1960s–present
- Tourist routes: South Carolina Heritage Corridor: Discovery Route

Major junctions
- South end: SC 59 in Seneca
- US 76 / US 123 / SC 28 in Seneca; SC 183 near Lake Keowee; SC 11 near Salem
- North end: NC 281 at the North Carolina state line at Bad Creek

Location
- Country: United States
- State: South Carolina
- Counties: Oconee

Highway system
- South Carolina State Highway System; Interstate; US; State; Scenic
← SC 129	→ SC 133

South Carolina Highway 130 (SC 130) is a 30.072-mile (48.396 km) state highway in Oconee County, South Carolina, connecting Clemson and eastern Oconee County with access to Lake Keowee, Lake Jocassee, and the Blue Ridge Mountains.

== Route description ==
SC 130 travels generally in a south–north direction, beginning at a major intersection with South Carolina Highway 59 in downtown Seneca. SC 130 leaves downtown towards the east and intersects with Clemson Boulevard (US 76/US 123/SC 28). Traveling northward, the route becomes a two lane configuration and becomes more rural in character. SC 130 skirts the southern and eastern edges of Lake Keowee and provides beautiful views of the lake and the Blue Ridge Mountains. The route passes by several upscale lakefront communities and the old mill town of Newry. The route passes by the Oconee Nuclear Station prior to crossing Lake Keowee.

The route continues northward and passes through the small town of Salem before intersecting with the Cherokee Foothills Scenic Highway (SC 11). North of that intersection, the route becomes more windy as it enters the mountains and begins an uphill climb. Shortly before crossing into North Carolina, there are several overlooks offering attractive vistas of Lake Jocassee and the Upstate region. Upon crossing the state line, the route offers access to the Whitewater Falls recreation area. North of the state line, the route becomes North Carolina Highway 281 towards Lake Toxaway.

== Major intersections ==
The entire route is in Oconee County.

Location	mi	km	Destinations	Notes
Seneca	0.000	0.000	SC 59 (West North 1st Street / North Oak Street) – Westminster, Walhalla, Fair Play	Southern terminus
Seneca	1.630	2.623	US 76 / US 123 / SC 28 (Clemson Boulevard) – Clemson, Westminster, Walhalla	
Lake Keowee	8.690	13.985	SC 183 east (East Pickens Highway) / Doug Hollow Road – Pickens	Southern end of SC 183 concurrency
Lake Keowee	10.300	16.576	SC 183 west (Pickens Highway) / Sextant Drive – Walhalla	Northern end of SC 183 concurrency
Salem	19.760	31.801	SC 11 (Cherokee Foothills Scenic Highway) – Pumpkintown, Tamassee	
	30.072	48.396	NC 281 north – Whitewater Falls, Cashiers	Continuation into North Carolina
1.000 mi = 1.609 km; 1.000 km = 0.621 mi: Concurrency terminus
