= Foothills Trail =

Long-distance hiking trail in the United States

Coordinates: 35.01287°N 83.04931°W

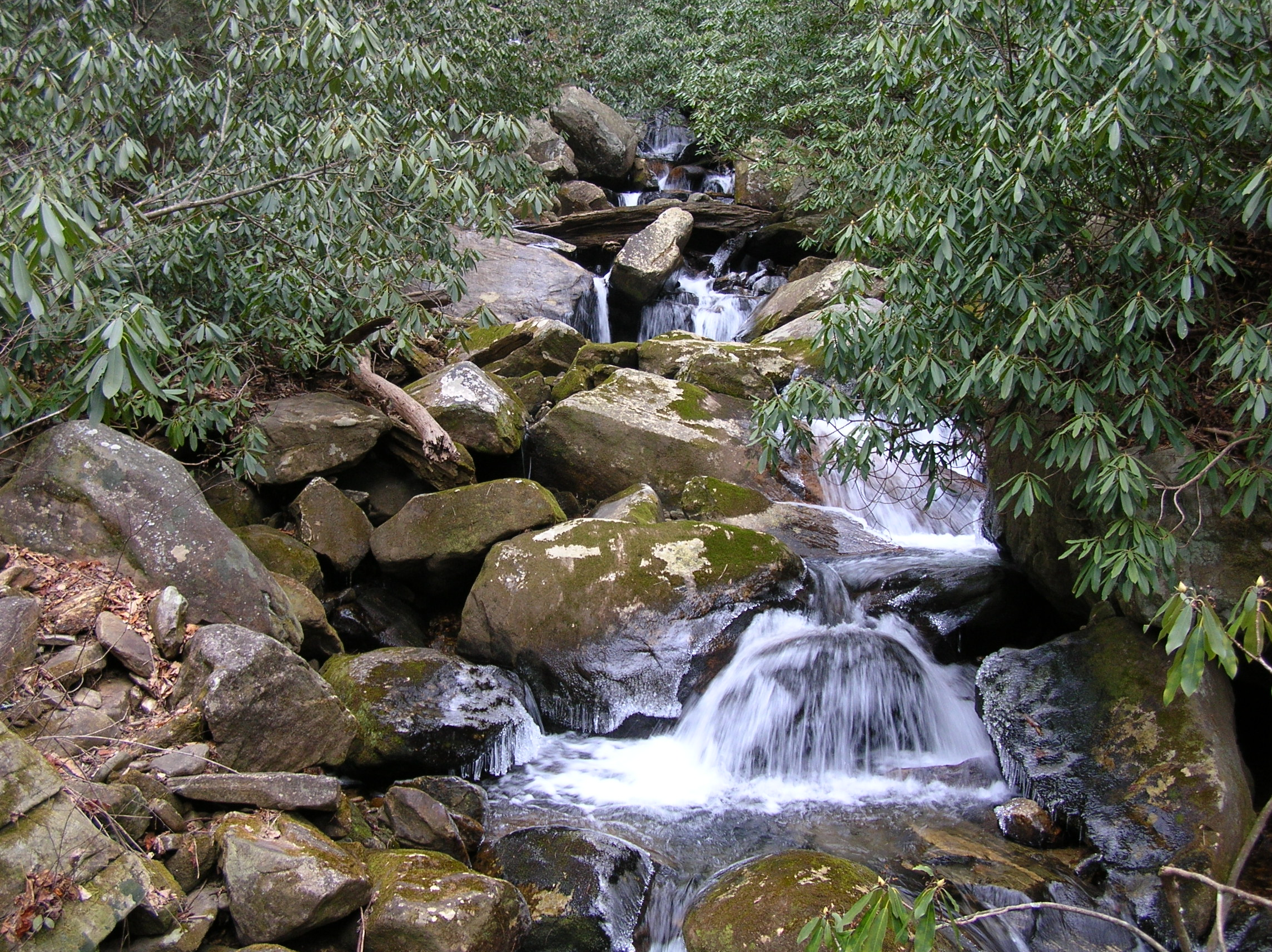
- Picture of a creek along the Upper Whitewater Falls section
- Length: 76.2 mi (122.6 km)
- Location: South Carolina and North Carolina, United States
- Trailheads: Table Rock State Park; Oconee State Park
- Use: Foot trail for recreational hiking and backpacking
- Highest point: Sassafras Mountain
- Difficulty: Easy to strenuous

The Foothills Trail is a 76-mile (122 km) National Recreation Trail in South and North Carolina, United States, for recreational hiking and backpacking. It extends from Table Rock State Park to Oconee State Park. It passes through the Andrew Pickens Ranger District of the Sumter National Forest, Ellicott Rock Wilderness, Whitewater Falls, and Lake Jocassee.

The U.S. Forest Service built the section in the Sumter National Forest starting in 1968. Duke Power Company built the middle portion of the trail as a recreational resource in conjunction with its Bad Creek pumped storage hydroelectric project. The trail is maintained by the Foothills Trail Conference.

== The trail ==
- Table Rock State Park to Sassafras Mountain is an 8.8-mile (14.2 km) section of the trail that ascends over 2,300 feet (700 m). It passes near peak of Pinnacle Mountain and ends near the peak of Sassafras Mountain. There is a spur trail at Sassafras Mountain to Caesars Head State Park described below.
- Sassafras Mountain to Chimneytop Gap is a 2.7-mile (4.3 km) section of the trail. It goes over the peak of Sassafras Mountain, descends about 1,000 feet (300 m), and ends at Chimneytop Gap.
- Chimneytop Gap to Laurel Valley is a 2.1-mile (3.4 km) section of the trail that descends about 800 feet (200 m) and ends near U.S. Highway 178. There is a spur trail to the Eastatoe Gorge Natural Area that is described below.

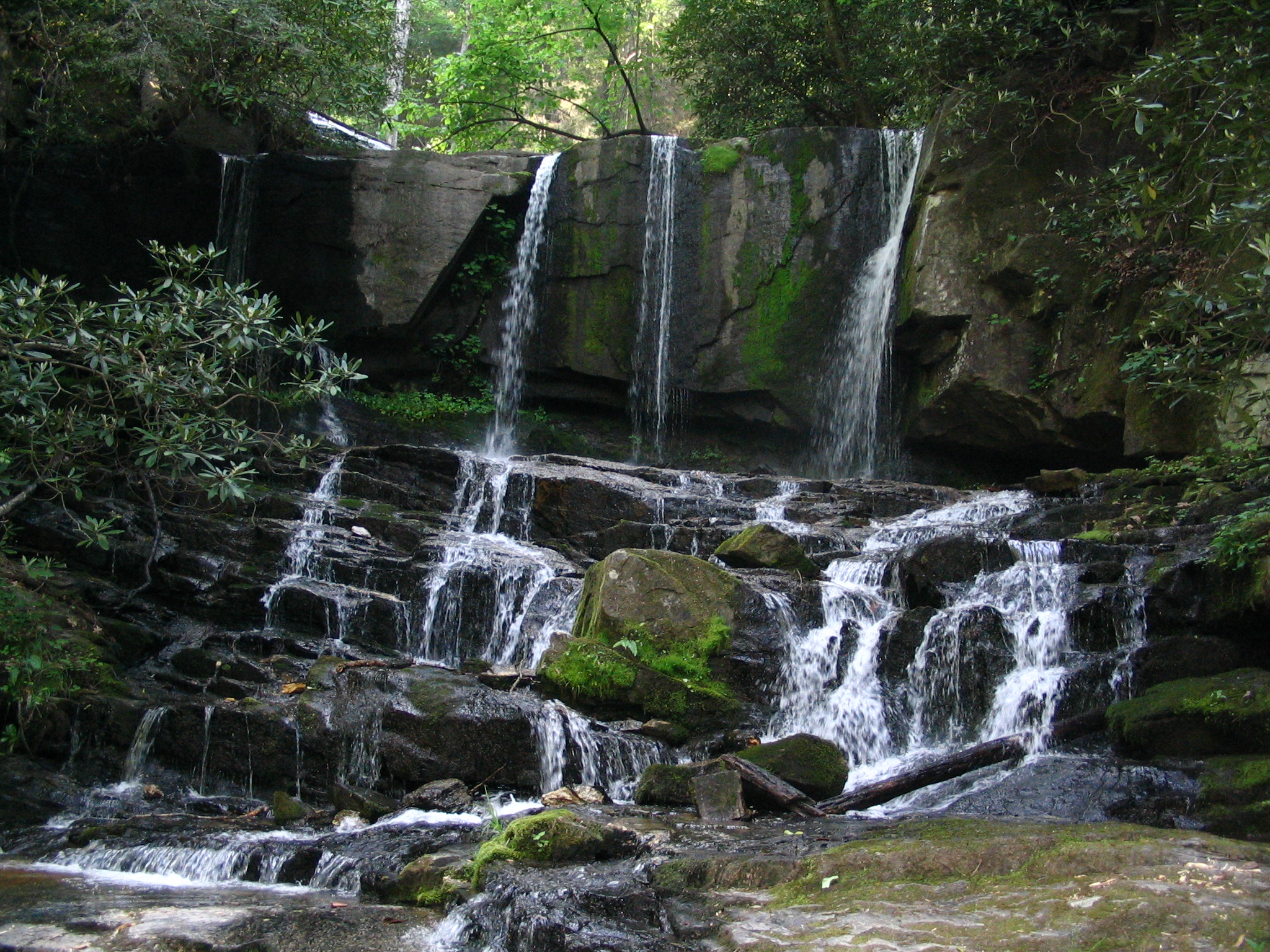
Virginia Hawkins Falls, located between Laurel Valley and Laurel Fork Falls

- Laurel Valley to Laurel Fork Falls is an 8.1-mile (13.0 km) section of the trail that ascends about 800 feet (200 m), then descends about 1,200 feet (400 m), and ends at Lower Fork Falls. There are a number of bridges on the trail that cross Laurel Fork Creek. At Laurel Fork Falls, there is a boat access to Lake Jocassee.
- Laurel Fork Falls to Canebrake is a 5.8-mile (9.3 km) section of the trail that has steep ascents and descents. It crosses into North Carolina. There is a boat access to Lake Jocassee at Canebrake.
- Canebrake to Bad Creek Access is a 16.4-mile (26.4 km) section of the trail that has steep ascents and descents. There are foot bridges crossing the Toxaway River, the Thompson River, and Bearcat Creek. It crosses back into South Carolina. At the Bad Creek Access, there are two short spur trails to Lower Whitewater Falls Overlook and the Bad Creek Visitors Center.
- Bad Creek Access to Upper Whitewater Falls is a 2.3-mile (3.7 km) section of the trail. Much of it parallels the Whitewater River. It crosses back into North Carolina. There is net ascent of about 800 feet (200 m).
- Upper Whitewater Falls to Sloan Bridge is a 5.5-mile (8.9 km) section of the trail that crosses into North Carolina and back into South Carolina. It ends at SC Highway 107.
- Sloan Bridge to Fish Hatchery Road is a 3.3-mile (5.3 km) section of the trail that starts at SC Highway 107 and ends at Fish Hatchery Road. There is an alternate trail, which is described below, from Sloan Bridge to rejoin the Foothills Trail at the Chattooga Trail intersection.
- Fish Hatchery Road to Burrell's Ford Road is a 3.9-mile (6.3 km) section of the trail descends into the Chattooga River gorge. The last portion of this trail intersects the Chattooga Trail. It end at Burrell's Ford campground. There is a net descent of about 800 feet (200 m).
- Burrell's Ford Road to Cheohee Road is a 10.4-mile (16.7 km) section of the trail that parallels the Chattooga River. It intersects the Bartram Trail, which connects to the Appalachian Trail. The trail ascends from the Chattooga River back to SC Highway 107.
- Cheohee Road to Jumping Branch Trailhead is a short 1.4-mile (2.3 km) section of the trail that travels east of SC Highway 107 and bends back to this highway.
- Jumping Branch Trailhead to Oconee State Park is a 4.6-mile (7.4 km) section of the trail travels from SC Highway 107 to the trail's terminus at Oconee State Park.

== Spur Trails ==
- Sassafras Mountain to Caesars Head State Park is a 14.2 miles (22.9 km) trail that passes through Headwaters State Forest and ends at U.S. Highway 276. There is another trail connecting to Jones Gap State Park.
- Eastatoe Gorge Spur is a 2.3 miles (3.7 km) dead-end spur that goes into the Eastatoe Gorge Natural Area.
- Fork Mountain Trail is a 12.2 miles (19.6 km) long, alternate route from Sloan Bridge that rejoins the Foothills Trail above Burrell's Ford. A section of the trail parallels the Chattooga River in the Ellicott Rock Wilderness. The trail passes by Ellicott's Rock, which is on the Chattooga River.
- Jocasse Gorges Passage of the Palmetto Trail. At Table Rock State Park, there is a 12.5 miles (20.1 km) long section of the Palmetto Trail and goes west into Jocassee Gorges.
- Oconee Passage of the Palmetto Trail. At Oconee State Park, there is a 3.2 miles (5.1 km) long section of the Palmetto Trail that goes east toward Oconee Station State Historic Site.
