= List of South Carolina state parks =

South Carolina State Parks
Agency overview
- Formed: 1933
- Headquarters: 1205 Pendleton Street; Columbia, SC 29201
- Annual budget: $120 million (2008)
- Agency executive: Joy Raintree, State Park Director
- Parent agency: S.C. Department of Parks, Recreation and Tourism
- Website: http://www.southcarolinaparks.com

The State of South Carolina has a group of protected areas managed by the South Carolina State Park Service (often abbreviated to SCPRT or Park Service). Formed in 1933 in conjunction with the formalization of the federal Civilian Conservation Corps program, the State Park Service is administered by the state's Department of Parks, Recreation & Tourism (SCPRT). There are a total of 50 facilities that the State Park Service administers, protecting more than 90,000 acres of sensitive, attractive, and/or historically significant lands in South Carolina. The facilities fall under four classifications:

- 40 state parks
- 8 state historic sites
- 1 state resort park
- 1 state recreational area

Cheraw State Park was the first park to be proposed within the system in 1934, with Myrtle Beach State Park becoming the first park to open in 1936. Within six years, the State of South Carolina and the CCC opened 16 state parks. Originally under the jurisdiction of the South Carolina Forestry Commission, the Park Service has been a unit within the Department of Parks, Recreation & Tourism since its formation in 1967. Hunting Island State Park in Beaufort County is the most popular state park in South Carolina and among the most popular in the United States, attracting 1.2 million visitors per year.

Following the Nukegate scandal, Dominion Energy settled with the South Carolina tax agency on $165 million in unpaid taxes owed due to an unfinished nuclear project in Fairfield County. As part of that settlement, the state agency and Dominion Energy agreed that Dominion would offset approximately a third of the unpaid taxes by turning over more than 2,900 acres of land which will ultimately become several new state parks in the coming years. The first state park opened from the settlement is Pine Island on Lake Murray.

South Carolina state parks (hover mouse over pog to pop up clickable link)

Park name	County or counties	Size		Year acquired	Year opened
Park name	County or counties	acres	ha	Year acquired	Year opened
Aiken State Park	Aiken	1,067	432	1934	1936
Andrew Jackson State Park	Lancaster	360	150	1953	1957
Baker Creek State Park	McCormick	1,305	528	1967	1968
Barnwell State Park	Barnwell	307	124	1937	1939
Black River State Park	Georgetown, Williamsburg	9,000	3,600	2021	2026
Caesars Head State Park	Greenville	7,467	3,022	1976	1986
Calhoun Falls State Park	Abbeville	318	129	1982	
Charles Towne Landing State Historic Site	Charleston	184	74	1970	1970
Cheraw State Park	Chesterfield	7,362	2,979	1934	1939
Chester State Park	Chester	523	212	1935	1936
Colleton State Park	Colleton	35	14	1938	1940
Colonial Dorchester State Historic Site	Dorchester	325	132	1960	1960
Croft State Park	Spartanburg	7,054	2,855	1949	
Devils Fork State Park	Oconee	622	252	1991	1991
Dreher Island State Park	Newberry	348	141	1970	1970
Edisto Beach State Park	Colleton	1,255	508	1935	1937
Givhans Ferry State Park	Colleton, Dorchester	988	400	1934	1937
Goodale State Park	Kershaw	963	390	1973	1973
H. Cooper Black Jr. Memorial Field Trial and Recreation Area	Chesterfield	7,000	2,800	1994	2006
Hamilton Branch State Park	McCormick	731	296	1972	1972
Hampton Plantation State Historic Site	Charleston	300	120	1972	
Hickory Knob State Resort Park	McCormick	1,091	442	1969	1973
Hunting Island State Park	Beaufort	5,000	2,000	1938	1941
Huntington Beach State Park	Georgetown	2,500	1,000	1960	1962
Jones Gap State Park	Greenville	3,964	1,604	1976	1985
Keowee-Toxaway State Park	Pickens	1,000	400	1970	1975
Kings Mountain State Park	Cherokee, York	6,885	2,786	1934	1936
Lake Greenwood State Park	Greenwood	914	370	1938	1940
Lake Hartwell State Park	Oconee	680	280	1976	1985
Lake Warren State Park	Hampton	440	180	1980	1990
Lake Wateree State Park	Fairfield	238	96	1982	1985
Landsford Canal State Park	Chester, Lancaster	448	181	1970	1973
Lee State Park	Lee	2,839	1,149	1935	1941
Little Pee Dee State Park	Dillon	835	338	1951	1955
May Forest State Park	Charleston	23	9.3	2021	2023
Musgrove Mill State Historic Site	Laurens, Spartanburg, Union	380	150	1975	2003
Myrtle Beach State Park	Horry	312	126	1935	1936
Oconee State Park	Oconee	1,165	471	1935	1937
Oconee Station State Historic Site	Oconee	210	85	1976	1994
Paris Mountain State Park	Greenville	1,540	620	1935	1937
Pine Island State Park	Lexington	27	11	2021	2025
Poinsett State Park	Sumter	1,010	410	1934	1936
Redcliffe Plantation State Historic Site	Aiken	350	140	1973	1975
Rivers Bridge State Historic Site	Bamberg	390	160	1945	1945
Rose Hill Plantation State Historic Site	Union	44	18	1960	1961
Sadlers Creek State Park	Anderson	395	160	1966	1968
Santee State Park	Orangeburg	2,500	1,000	1942	1949
Sesquicentennial State Park	Richland	1,419	574	1937	1940
Table Rock State Park	Pickens	3,083	1,248	1935	1940
Woods Bay State Park	Clarendon, Florence, Sumter	1,590	640	1973	1973
