= Whitewater Falls =

Whitewater Falls may refer to a location in the United States:

- Whitewater Falls, Minnesota, an abandoned town
- Whitewater Falls (North Carolina), a series of cascades
  - Upper Whitewater Falls the upper section of it
- Whitewater Falls a themepark ride at California's Great America#Haunt attractions
