= Chester Park =

Chester Park may refer to:

- Chester Park, Bristol, a residential area in Bristol, England
- Chester Park, Duluth, a neighborhood in Duluth, Minnesota, U.S.
- Chester State Park, a state park of South Carolina, U.S.
- Grosvenor Park, Chester, a public park in Chester, England
