= Horsepasture River =

Stream in North Carolina, USA

Horsepasture River Tributary to Toxaway River
- Location of Horsepasture River mouth Horsepasture River (the United States)

Location
- Country: United States
- State: North Carolina; South Carolina
- County: Jackson County, NC; Transylvania County, NC; Oconee County, SC

Physical characteristics
- Source: Hurricane Creek divide
  - location: about 2 miles north of Cashiers, North Carolina
  - coordinates: 35°07′46″N 083°06′28″W
  - elevation: 3,860 ft (1,180 m)
- Mouth: Toxaway River
  - location: Lake Jocassee
  - coordinates: 35°01′48″N 082°55′02″W
  - elevation: 1,108 ft (338 m)
- Length: 3.96 mi (6.37 km)
- Basin size: 30.18 square miles (78.2 km^{2})
- Discharge
  - location: Toxaway River
  - average: 124.61 cu ft/s (3.529 m^{3}/s) at mouth with Toxaway River

Basin features
- Progression: east and southeast
- River system: Keowee River
- Tributaries
  - left: Laurel Creek; Logan Creek; Mud Creek; Little Hogback Creek; Hogback Creek; Rock Creek; James Creek
  - right: Rochester Creek; Nix Creek; Burlingame Creek; Bearcamp Creek
- Waterbodies: Lupton Lake; Sapphire Lake
- Bridges: Big Steeplechase Road, Wandering Ridge, Haven Ridge Trail, US 64, Getaway Ridge, Sapphire Valley Road, Cherokee Trail, Carters Grove, Meadow Way, Deer Run Road, Bear Pen Drive, Sapphire Post Office Road, Upper Whitewater Road, Whitewater Road, Auger Hole Trail
Designations
National Wild and Scenic River
- Type: Scenic, Recreational
- Designated: October 26, 1986

The Horsepasture River is an 18.1-mile-long (29.1 km) National Wild and Scenic river in the U.S. states of North Carolina and South Carolina. The river rises in Jackson County, North Carolina, and flows through the Jocassee Gorges area and ends at Lake Jocassee in South Carolina. Some of the land over which the river flows is part of the Pisgah National Forest, making it accessible to the public.

North Carolina designated 4.5 miles (7.2 km) of the river as Horsepasture State Natural River in 1985, including it in the state's Natural and Scenic Rivers System. The State River is between NC-281 and the state line.

The Horsepasture River features several significant waterfalls in close proximity to one another. The named falls are:

- Drift Falls
- Turtleback Falls
- Rainbow Falls
- Hidden Falls
- Stairway Falls
- Sidepocket Falls
- Windy Falls

== See also ==
- Gorges State Park provides the only easy, legal access to the river's waterfalls.
- List of waterfalls
- List of waterfalls in North Carolina
