= Corbin Creek Falls =

Waterfall in the Blue Ridge Mountains of North Carolina, US

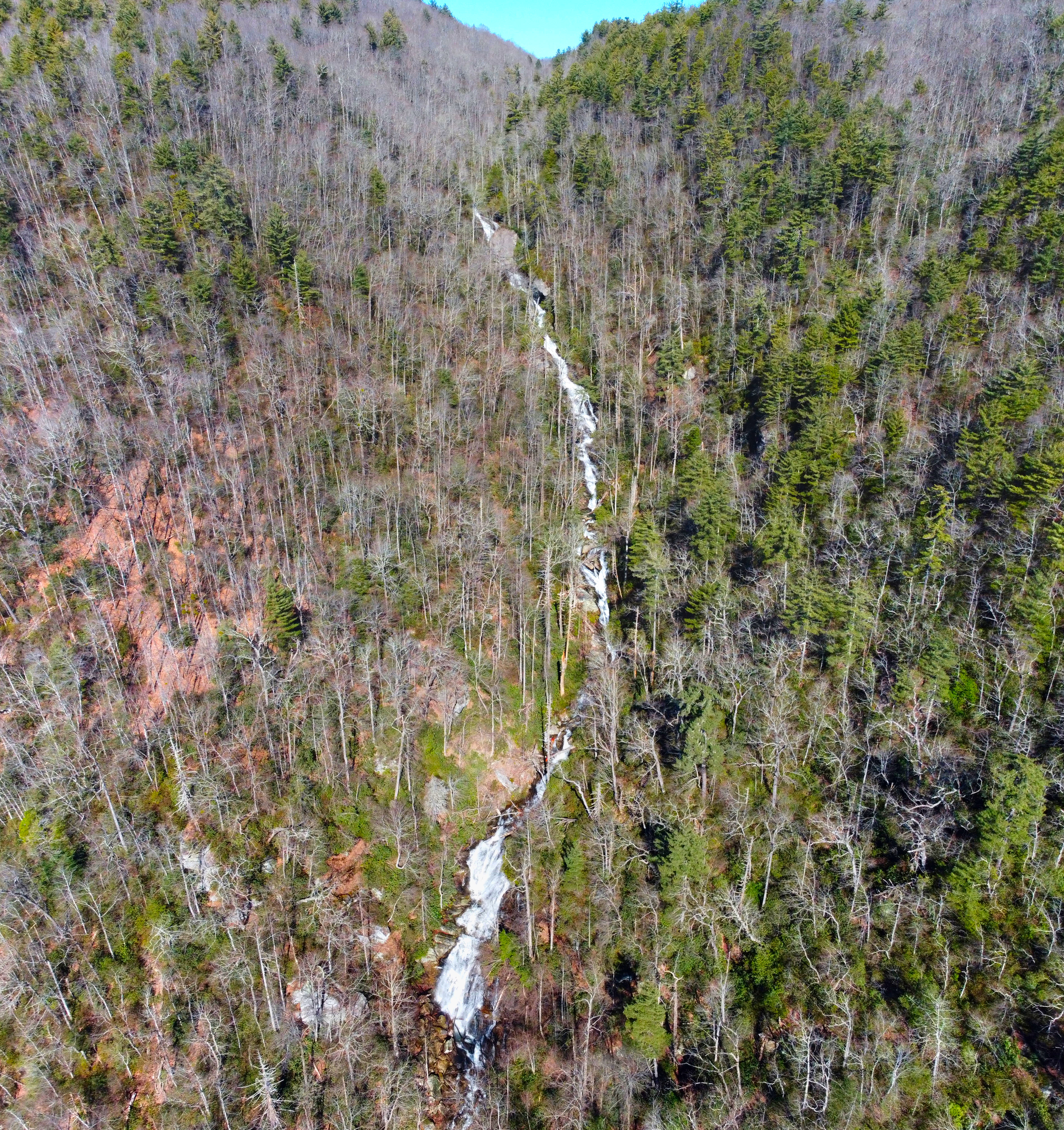
- Winter aerial view of Corbin Creek Falls in North Carolina
- Interactive map of Corbin Creek Falls
- Location: Corbin Creek, Transylvania County, in the Blue Ridge Mountains of North Carolina
- Coordinates: 35.036873°N 83.011782°W
- Type: Cascade
- Total height: appx. 600 ft (180 m)

Corbin Creek Falls is a waterfall in North Carolina on Corbin Creek near Upper Whitewater Falls. As with most of North Carolina's waterfalls, it is in the mountainous area of the state. There is a cluster of falls in the area where the borders of Georgia and the Carolinas come together. Corbin Creek Falls is part of that group, very close to the South Carolina border.

== Natural history ==
Corbin Creek Falls is viewable in the same area as Upper Whitewater Falls. Corbin Creek Falls cascades 600 feet (180 m) over the course of a half mile. However, not all of the falls can be seen from one location, and the hike to the falls is very difficult.

There is some debate as to the height of the falls. Kevin Adams' book North Carolina Waterfalls lists the height as over 400 feet (120 m). NCWaterfalls.com lists the falls as "tumbling 600 feet", but states that it would hesitate to call the falls a 600-foot waterfall. Google Earth, from the first dropoff at lat 35.037517, long -83.011653 indicate a starting elevation of 2,716 feet (828 m), and a closing elevation of 2,060 feet (630 m) at 35.032859, -83.013340, giving a height of 656 feet (200 m).

== Visiting ==
Visitors to the falls must pay a $3 fee to view the falls. There are winter and spring views from platforms and paths at Whitewater Falls.

The area surrounding the falls is sufficiently treacherous that hiking off-trail in the area is strongly discouraged by park rangers.

== Nearby falls ==
- Upper Whitewater Falls
- Lower Whitewater Falls

== See also ==
- List of waterfalls
- List of waterfalls in North Carolina
