= Rainbow Falls (Horsepasture River) =

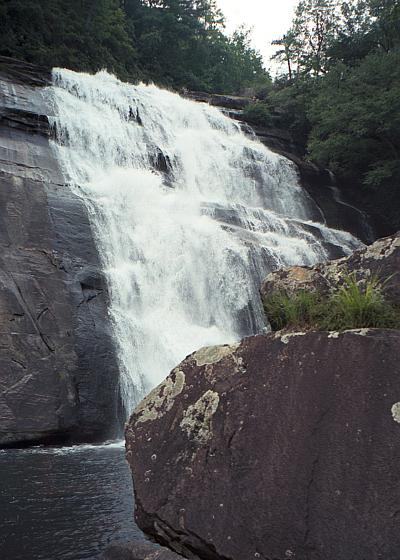
- Rainbow Falls on the Horsepasture River
- Interactive map of Rainbow Falls
- Location: Horsepasture River, Pisgah National Forest, Blue Ridge Mountains, Transylvania County, North Carolina
- Coordinates: 35.0907°N 82.9659°W
- Type: Cascade
- Total height: 125 ft (38.1 m)

Rainbow Falls is a waterfall in Western North Carolina, located near Brevard. The falls is located on the Horsepasture River. It is on Pisgah National Forest land just outside Gorges State Park.

== History ==
A proposal to route the flow of the river around the falls in the mid 1980s for a hydroelectric power plant was thwarted by public opposition. On October 27, 1986, the Horsepasture River was designated a national Wild and Scenic River, protecting the falls from future development.

== Geology ==
The rock face over which the river flows is not vertical, but the large volume of water during normal river flows causes it to leap many feet out from the rock and a deep plunge pool lies at the bottom of the falls. It creates large amounts of wind and mist that race up the hillside opposite the falls. If the sun is in the right position, a rainbow is easily observed here, giving the falls its name.

== Nearby falls ==
- Little Falls - located on private property upstream from Drift Falls
- Narrows Falls - located in a gated community upstream from Drift Falls
- Rock House Falls - 55-ft falls located on private property on Burlingame Creek, a tributary of the Horsepasture River
- Turtleback Falls
- Drift Falls
- Stairway Falls
- Sidepocket Falls
- Windy Falls

== See also ==
- List of waterfalls
- List of waterfalls in North Carolina
