= Station Cove Falls =

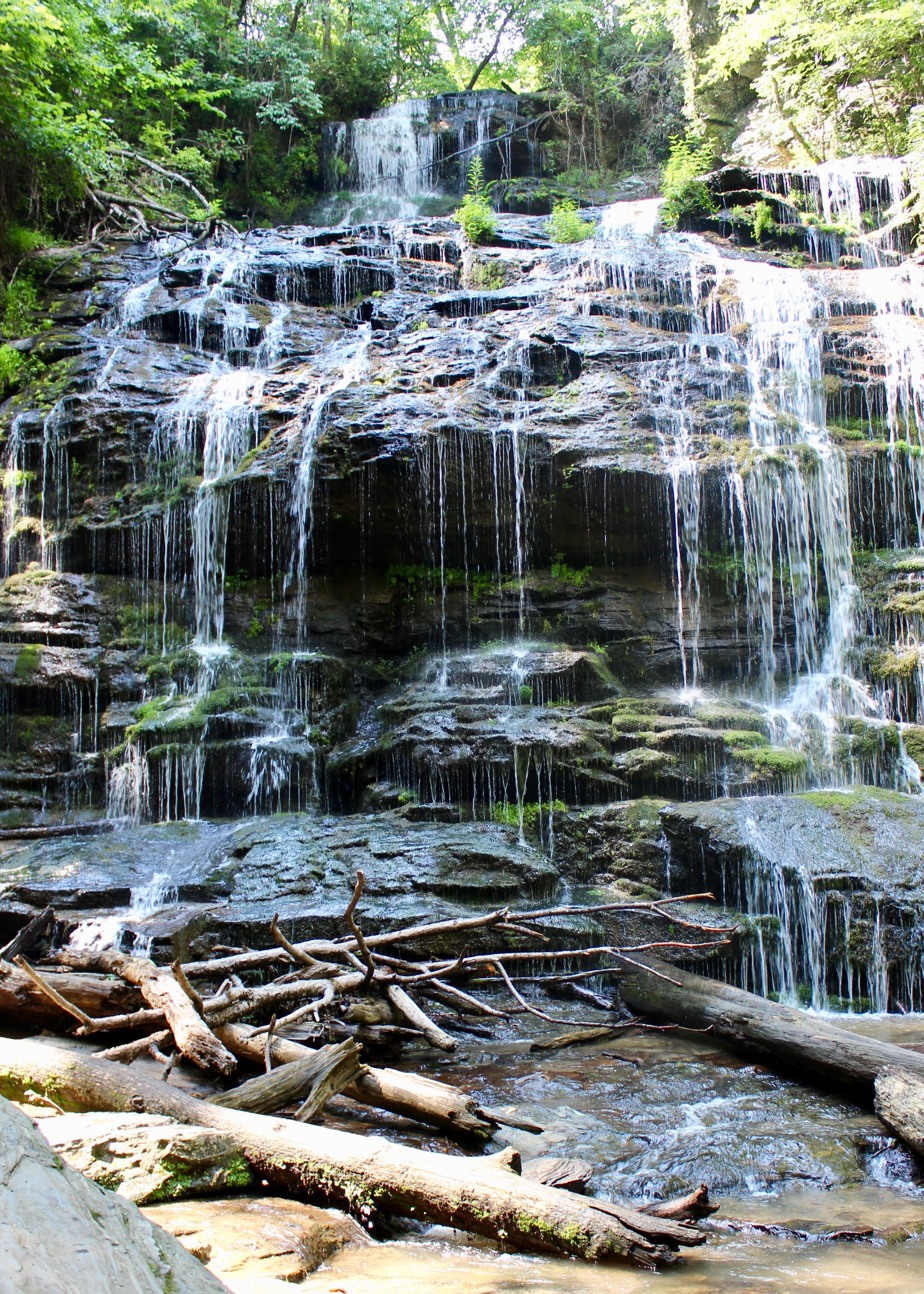
- Station Cove Falls
- Interactive map of Station Cove Falls
- Location: Walhalla, South Carolina
- Coordinates: 34°50′58.05″N 83°5′8.35″W
- Type: Cascade
- Total height: 60 ft (18 m)

Station Cove Falls, near Walhalla, South Carolina, is a 60 ft (18 m) high cascade waterfall in the Andrew Pickens Ranger District of the Sumter National Forest, near Oconee Station State Historic Site. The falls is reached by an easy 3/4 mile hike with one stream crossing through a canopy of mature basswood, buckeye, and American beech. During the months of March and April, the trail features one of the largest wildflower displays in South Carolina.
