= Palmetto Trail =

Coordinates: 33.5920409°N 79.0191106°W

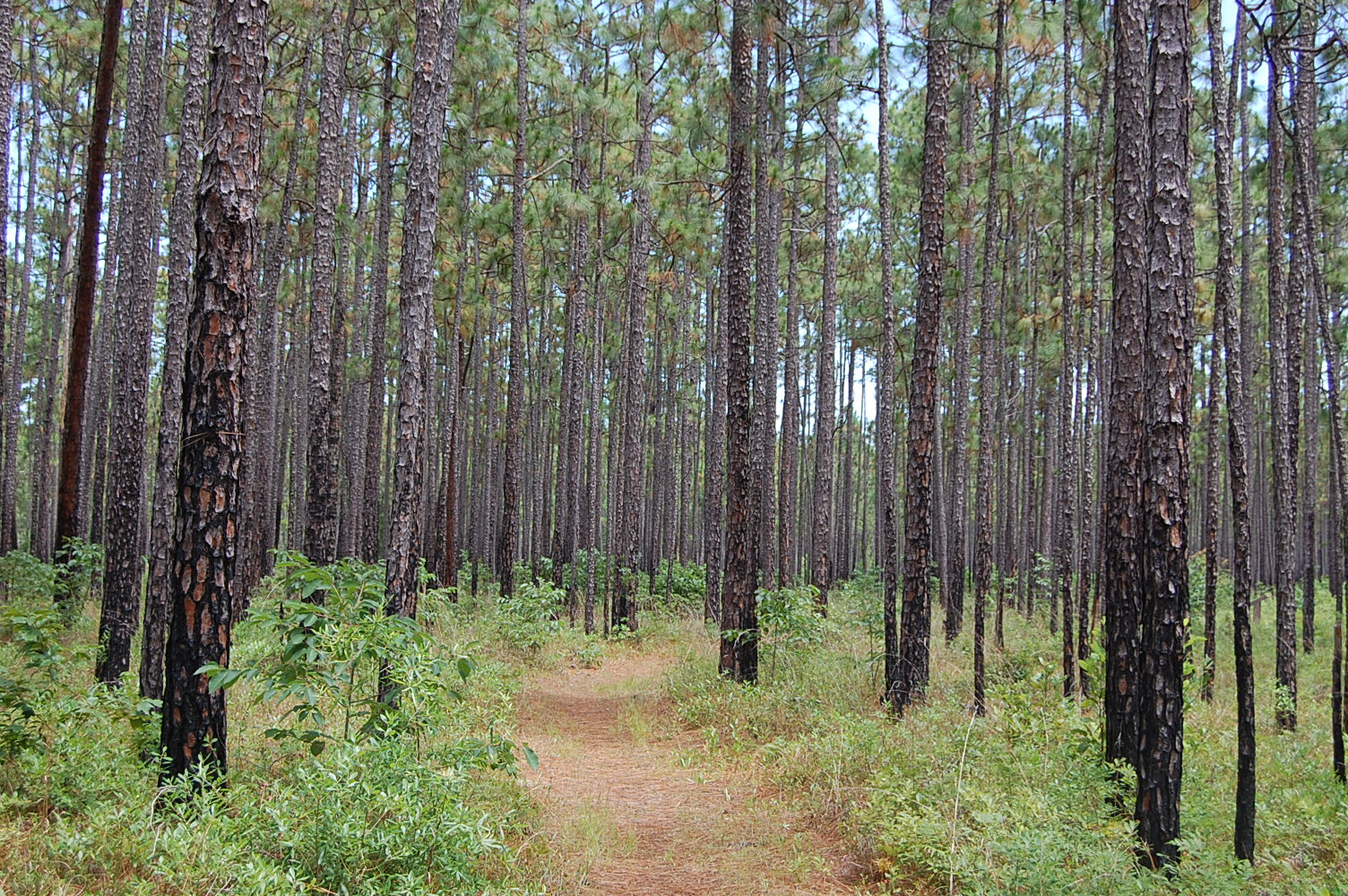
- Palmetto Trail in Francis Marion National Forest
- Length: 350 miles (563.3 km)
- Location: South Carolina, United States
- Established: 1994
- Trailheads: Multiple, see Mini-trail guide
- Use: Hiking
- Highest point: Sassafras Mountain, 3,553 feet (1,083 m)
- Lowest point: Intracoastal Waterway, 0 feet (0 m)
- Difficulty: Easy to moderate
- Season: All seasons
- Maintainer: Palmetto Conservation Foundation
- Website: https://palmettoconservation.org/palmetto-trail/

The Palmetto Trail is a planned 500-mile-long (805 km) foot and mountain bike trail in South Carolina for recreational hiking and biking. Several of the sections are also equestrian trails. It will extend from the Oconee County mountains to the Intracoastal Waterway in Charleston County. It currently consists of 26 segments totaling 350 miles (563 km). Maps and trail guides are available.

The trail is sponsored by the Palmetto Conservation Foundation in cooperation with the South Carolina Department of Parks, Recreation, and Tourism. The trail has support from the South Carolina General Assembly. Actual trail construction has been aided by volunteer groups, land managers, Santee Cooper, the South Carolina National Guard, and many others.

== Mini-trail guide ==
Order (Mountains to Sea)	Passage	Image	Length		Description
Order (Mountains to Sea)	Passage	Image	mi	km	Description
1	Stumphouse Passage		1.5	2.4	
2	Oconee Passage		3.73	6.0	This is a 3.73-mile (6.0 km) section of the trail in Oconee County. It descends about 1,000 feet (300 m) from Oconee State Park to County Highway 95. It passes near Station Cove Falls. There is a hiker-only spur trail to the falls. At the terminus of the Oconee passage, there is a short spur trail to the Oconee Station State Historic Site. At Oconee State Park, campsites are available. Hikers can also connect to the Foothills Trail.
3	Eastatoe Passage		4.6	7.4	
4	Blue Ridge Electric Co-op Passage (Jocassee Gorges)		12.6	20.3	This is a 12.6-mile (20.3 km) section of the trail. It begins at Table Rock State Park, goes west past the Wesleyan Camp, and extends in the Jocassee Gorges, which is owned by the South Carolina Department of Natural Resources. Campsites are available at Table Rock State Park.
5	Roundtop Mountain		5.9	9.5	
6	Middle Saluda Passage		11.1	17.9	
7	Saluda Mountains Passage		9.1	14.6	This is a 9.1-mile (14.6 km) section and begins at Orchard Lake Campground - the end of the Poinsett Reservoir Passage. The trail runs through the Poinsett Watershed, a 19,000-acre (7,700 ha) tract of property that includes the entire watershed feeding the Poinsett Reservoir of the Greenville Water System. The commissioners of the Greenville Water System granted permission for this hiking trail along the northern perimeter of the Watershed.
8	Poinsett Reservoir Passage		6.6	10.6	This 6.6-mile (10.6 km), moderate section of the trail begins at Orchard Lake Campground in Polk County, North Carolina. It travels southeasterly back into Greenville County, South Carolina. Then it goes through the Poinsett Watershed of the Greenville Water System. It ends at Vaughn's Gap where is continued by the Blue Wall Passage. The trail has about a 900-foot (300 m) net ascent from Orchard Lake to Rocky Spur, which is nearly one mile (1.6 km) from Vaughn's Gap. From Rocky Spur, the trail descends about 400 feet (100 m).
9	Blue Wall Passage		14	22.5	
10	Peach Country Passage		14.1	22.7	
11	USC Upstate Passage		1.3	2.1	
12	Hub City Connector		12	19.3	When completed, the Hub City Connector will be a continuous 12-mile (19.3 km) pathway of greenways, bicycle lanes, and safe, signed sidewalks through the city of Spartanburg County. As of summer 2006, four sections of the connector are complete*: School for the Deaf and Blind, Mary Black Rail Trail, Liberty Trail, and the University of South Carolina Upstate Passage.
13	Croft Passage		12.6	20.3	This is a 12.6-mile (20.3 km), easy to moderate section of the trail in Spartanburg County that goes through the Croft State Park. The trail enters Croft at the Glenn Springs Passage trailhead and crosses the new 65-foot (20 m) Advance America Bridge over Fairforest Creek. Hikers and equestrians follow established trails to the east and north while mountain bikers follow roads to the west and north until all join at Henningston Road. The newly built trail from mile 8.5 to the northern trailhead is truly multi-use and follows ridges, crosses drainages, and hugs Kelsey Creek to the historic Cedar Springs area.
14	Glenn Springs Passage		7	11.3	This is a 7-mile (11.3 km), easy to moderate section of the trail in Spartanburg County that goes from Croft State Park through the historic town of Glenn Springs, South Carolina, on continues south toward Union County, South Carolina.
15	Blackstock Battlefield Passage		4	6.4	This is a 4-mile (6.4 km), moderate section of the trail that goes around the site of the Battle of Blackstock's Farm at the boundary of Union and Spartanburg counties. Portions of the trail go along the Tyger River. Campsites are available.
16	Enoree Passage		36.88	59.35	
17	Lynch's Woods Passage		3	4.8	This is a 3-mile (4.8 km), moderate section of the trail for hikers and equestrians. It was developed and is managed by the Newberry County Recreation Department. The trail is a loop trail just outside Newberry, South Carolina. Picnic sites are available. There are additional equestrian trails and bike trails.
18	Newberry Passage		10.7	17.2	
19	Peak to Prosperity		10.7	17.2	
20	Capital City Passage		10.2	16.4	This is a 10.2-mile (16.4 km), easy, urban section of the trail that goes from Riverfront Park in Columbia, South Carolina to Fort Jackson. It passes by the South Carolina State Capitol and the Horseshoe of the University of South Carolina.
21	Fort Jackson Passage		16.3	26.2	This is a 16.3-mile (26 km), moderate section of the trail that goes through Fort Jackson in Richland County, South Carolina. This is contiguous with the Capital City Passage. Much of the trail goes along the southern boundary of this basic training center.
22	Wateree Passage		11.4	18.3	This is a 11.4-mile (18 km), easy to moderate section of the trail in Sumter County. The passage is one of the most diverse sections of the Palmetto Trail, traversing a variety of landscapes, from near mountainous terrain down to a magnificent river swamp. After two miles (3.2 km), the trail begins the ascent to the "High Hills of Santee," which is one of the highest elevations in Sumter County.
23	High Hills of Santee Passage		11.4	18.3	This is a 11.4-mile (18 km), easy section of the trail in Sumter County. It goes through Poinsett State Park, Manchester State Forest, and Mill Creek County Park. In addition to hiking and mountain biking, this is also an equestrian trail. It is contiguous with the Lake Marion Passage.
24	Lake Marion Passage		35.9	57.8	This is a 35.9-mile (58 km), easy section of the trail in Sumter, Clarendon, and Orangeburg counties. It goes along the north shore of Lake Marion, crosses the lake on U.S. Route 301 and ends in Santee. It is contiguous with the Santee Passage.
25	Santee Passage		13.9	22.4	This is an 13.9-mile (22 km), easy section of the trail in Orangeburg County. It starts in Santee, South Carolina, parallels the south shore of Lake Marion, and ends in Eutawville in Orangeburg County.
26	Eutaw Springs Passage		21.3	34.3	This is a 21.3-mile (34.3 km), easy section of the trail that starts in Eutawville in Orangeburg County, and ends on the south side of the Division Canal between Lake Marion and Lake Moultrie at South Carolina Highway 45 in Berkeley County. There is a campsite east of Eutawville.
27	Lake Moultrie Passage		26.7	43	This is a 26.7-mile (43 km), easy section of the trail that goes around the top half of Lake Moultrie in Berkeley County. It begins on the north side of the Diversion Canal and ends at the Canal Recreation Area. It has several primitive campsites.
28	Swamp Fox Passage		47.6	76.6	This is a 47.6-mile (77 km), easy section of the trail that starts at the Canal Recreation Area north of Moncks Corner in Berkeley County. It goes through the Francis Marion National Forest and ends at Awendaw in Charleston County. It incorporates most of the former Swamp Fox National Recreational Trail. There are primitive campsites along the trail.
29	Awendaw Passage		7.1	11.4	This is a 7.1-mile (11 km), easy section of the trail in Charleston County that starts near Awendaw and ends at Buck Hall Recreation Area on U.S. Route 17 at the Intracoastal Waterway. Campsites are available at the terminus.

== Maps ==
- http://palmettoconservation.org/palmetto-trail/map/
