= Baker Creek State Park =

State park in South Carolina, United States

- Location within South Carolina
- Interactive map of Baker Creek State Park
- Nearest city: McCormick, South Carolina
- Coordinates: 33°53′54″N 82°20′49″W
- Area: 1,305 acres (5.3 km^{2})
- Created: 1967
- Camp sites: tent and RV sites, primitive group site
- Hiking trails: over 10 miles (16 km)

Baker Creek State Park is located adjacent to Lake Thurmond, near the town of McCormick in the county of McCormick, South Carolina. The park sits on land leased in 1967 from the US Army Corps of Engineers.

Amenities in the park include two campgrounds, a lakefront pavilion, boat ramps for access to the lake and picnic shelters. The park is home to a nature trail where wildlife such as deer, waterfowl and wild turkeys can be observed. Mountain biking and hiking are popular activities on a 10-mile trail (16 km) that winds through the park.

== See also ==
- List of South Carolina state parks
