= Drift Falls =

- Interactive map of Drift Falls
- Location: Horsepasture River, Blue Ridge Mountains, Transylvania County, North Carolina
- Coordinates: 35.0934°N 82.9693°W
- Type: Slide, Fan
- Total height: 80 ft (24 m)

Drift Falls, also known as Bust-Yer-Butt Falls and Driftwood Falls, is a waterfall located on private property off of U.S. Route 64 in Transylvania County, North Carolina. It is on the Horsepasture River, upstream from Rainbow Falls and Turtleback Falls. It is accessible from the Rainbow Falls Trail, which passes through Gorges State Park and Nantahala National Forest on the way. The falls was once a popular place to swim and slide down; however, the property it is on has since changed hands and now, only a view from downstream is accessible.

== History ==
Drift Falls flows on the Horsepasture River in the Jocassee Gorge. The falls is an 80-ft. slide over bedrock to a deep pool, and is a part of a series of waterfalls along a 1,200-ft drop along the course of the river over a 2.5 mile stretch. In the past, large numbers of visitors to the falls would cause traffic problems along North Carolina Highway 281 as they gathered at the falls to swim in the pool. Thrill seekers would use the falls as a natural waterslide, which is how the falls got its nickname of "Bust-Yer-Butt Falls.”

== Nearby falls ==
- Little Falls — located on private property upstream from Drift Falls
- Narrows Falls — located in a gated community upstream from Drift Falls
- Rock House Falls — 55-ft falls located on private property on Burlingame Creek, a tributary of the Horsepasture River
- Turtleback Falls
- Rainbow Falls
- Hidden Falls — a 10-foot waterfall downstream from Rainbow Falls
- Stairway Falls
- Sidepocket Falls
- Windy Falls

== See also ==
- List of waterfalls
- List of waterfalls in North Carolina
