= Goodale State Park =

State park in South Carolina, United States

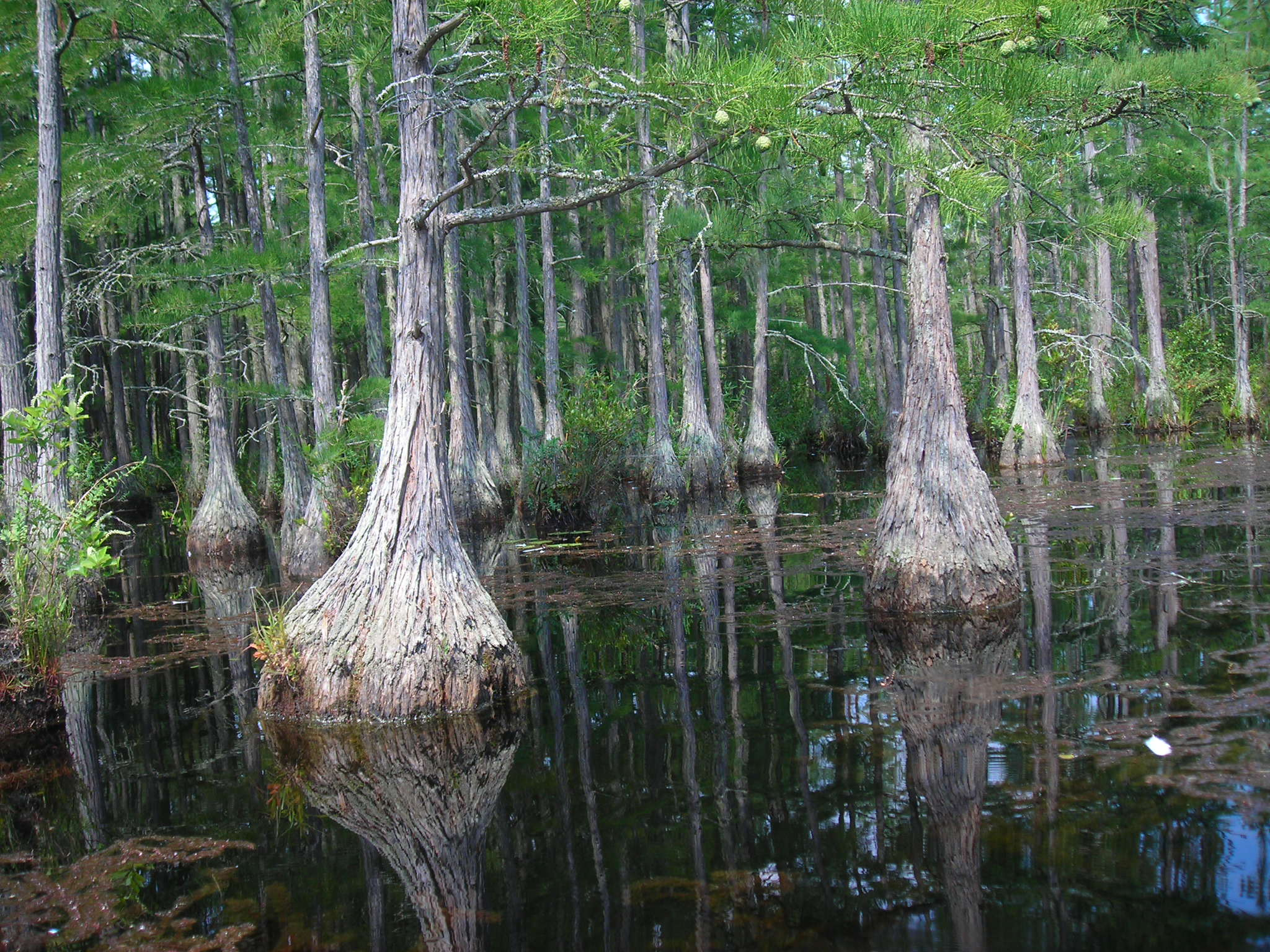
- Cypress trees in Pine Tree Creek, located at Goodale State Park near Camden, South Carolina

- Location within South Carolina
- Nearest city: Camden, South Carolina
- Coordinates: 34°17′12″N 80°31′17″W
- Area: 763 acres (3.09 km^{2})
- Created: 1973
- Camp sites: No camping is allowed in the park.
- Hiking trails: 1-mile (1.6 km)
- Other information: Park has 3 miles (4.8 km) of canoe trails, shelter rentals, boat and canoe rentals, and an 140-acre (0.57 km^{2}) lake.

Goodale State Park is a South Carolina state park located just outside Camden, SC. In addition to a 140-acre (0.57 km^{2}) lake, that is actually a Civil War era mill pond, this park also has canoe access to Pine Tree Creek. A canoe trail follows this creek for three miles (5 km) as it winds through the parks tall cypress trees. Admission to the park is free.

== History ==
The land for this park was donated to South Carolina by Kershaw County in 1973. The park is named after a local florist, N.R. Goodale, who helped motivate the creation of the park.
