= Whitewater Falls (North Carolina) =

Coordinates: 35.0712143°N 82.8868047°W

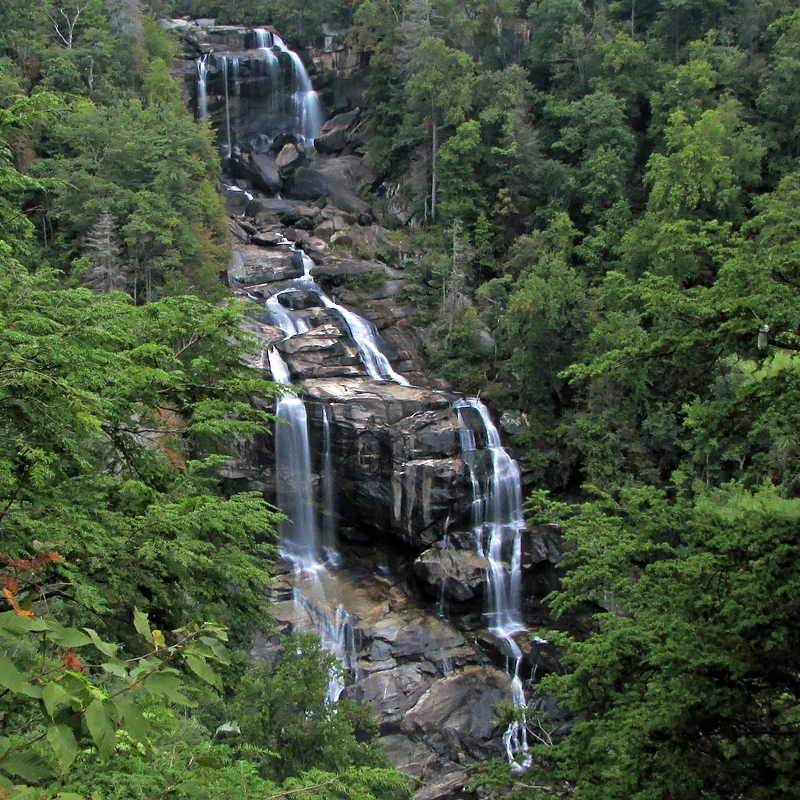
Upper Whitewater Falls

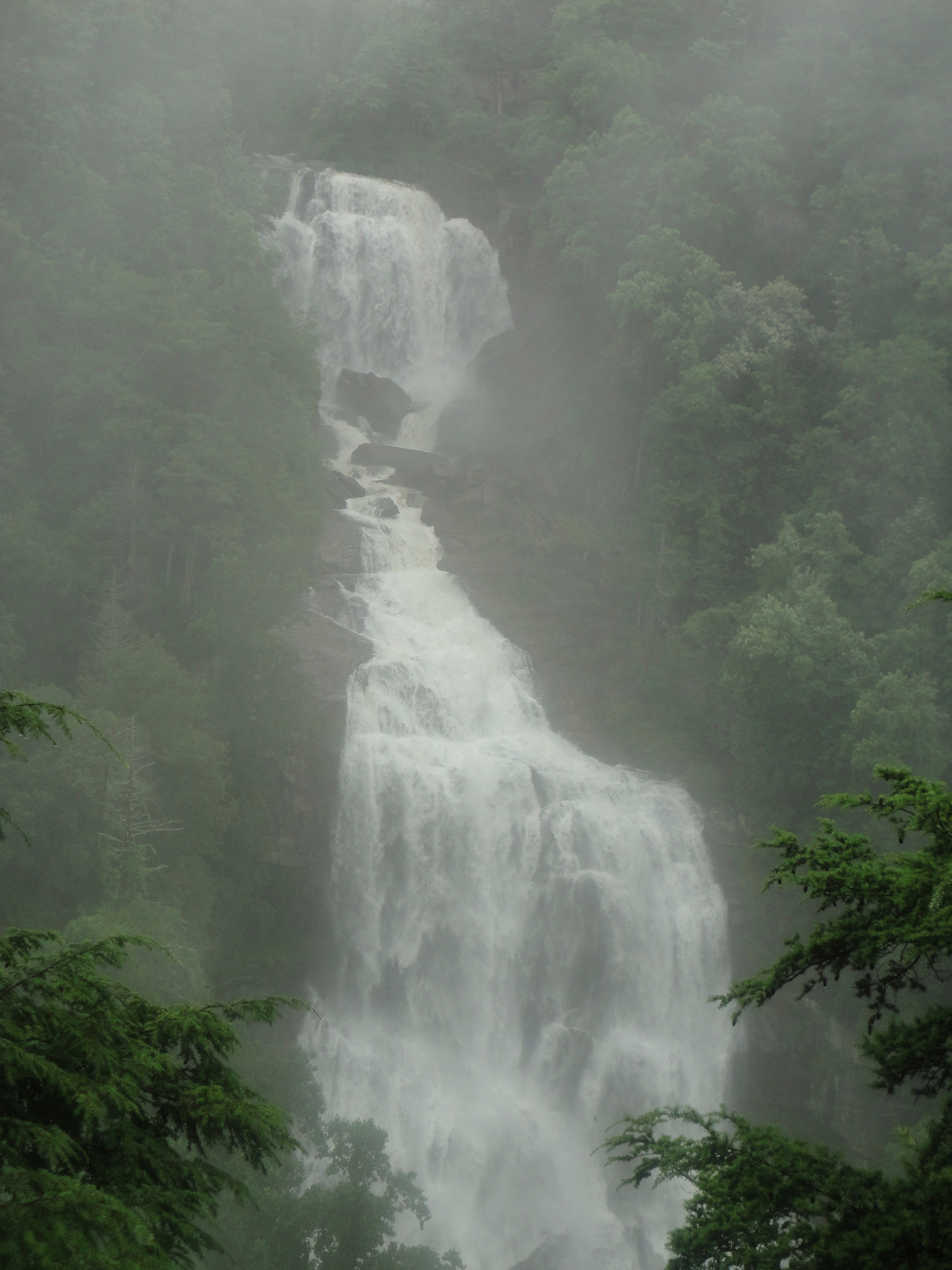
Upper Whitewater Falls after copious rainfall

Whitewater Falls is a series of waterfalls and cascades on the Whitewater River in North Carolina and South Carolina. Over the 3.5 mi (5.6 km) course of the river between the two falls, the Whitewater River drops 1,500 ft (460 m), and crosses the state border. Both Falls can be hiked to via the Foothills Trail or spur trails. Lookouts allow you to view both falls.

- Upper Whitewater Falls - the taller of the two falls 411 ft (125 m), Nantahala National Forest, Jackson County, North Carolina

According to the U.S. Forest Service, "With a 411-foot plunge, Upper Whitewater Falls in North Carolina is the highest waterfall east of the Rockies."

- Lower Whitewater Falls - the shorter of the two falls 200 ft (61 m), Sumter National Forest, Oconee County, South Carolina

== See also ==
- List of waterfalls
