= Oconee State Park =

State park in South Carolina, United States

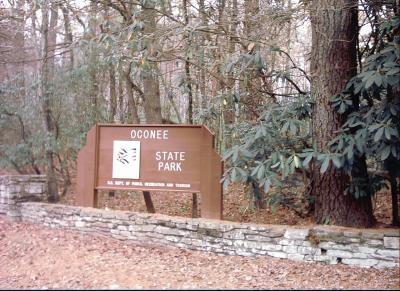
- A picture of the sign at the entrance to the park
- Interactive map of Oconee State Park
- Nearest city: Mountain Rest, SC
- Coordinates: 34°51′59.2″N 83°6′14.9″W
- Area: 1,165 acres (4.7 km^{2})
- Created: 1935
- Camp sites: Regular campsites, RV Campsites, and a set of campsites that require a hike in but are beside a lake
- Hiking trails: Foothills Trail, western trailhead Oconee Passage of the Palmetto Trail
- Other information: Fishing lakes offer bream and bass Chattooga and Chauga Rivers are in close proximity.
- Oconee State Park Historic District
- U.S. National Register of Historic Places
- U.S. Historic district
- Location within South Carolina Location within the United States
- Area: 1,165 acres (471.5 ha)
- Built: 1935
- Architectural style: Late 19th And Early 20th Century American Movements, Rustic
- MPS: South Carolina State Parks MPS
- NRHP reference No.: 04000618
- Added to NRHP: June 16, 2004

Oconee State Park is a state park located in the Blue Ridge Mountain region of South Carolina. This 1165-acre (472 ha) park has several recreational opportunities to choose from. They include cabins, camping, fishing and boating in the two small lakes located on the park grounds, hiking on eight nature/hiking trails, and several picnic and meeting facilities.

The southern end of the Foothills Trail and the western end of the Oconee Passage of the Palmetto Trail are in Oconee State Park.

== History ==
Oconee State Park was created by the Civilian Conservation Corps (CCC) in the 1930s. This park was created during the Great Depression when Franklin D. Roosevelt put men to work in civilian works projects. Some of the park buildings existing today were made by the CCC.

Fifteen cabins, the superintendent's residence and garage, several shelters, the swimming lake and bath house and several other structures were listed on the National Register of Historic Places in 2004.

== See also ==
- List of South Carolina state parks
