= Salem, South Carolina =

- Town
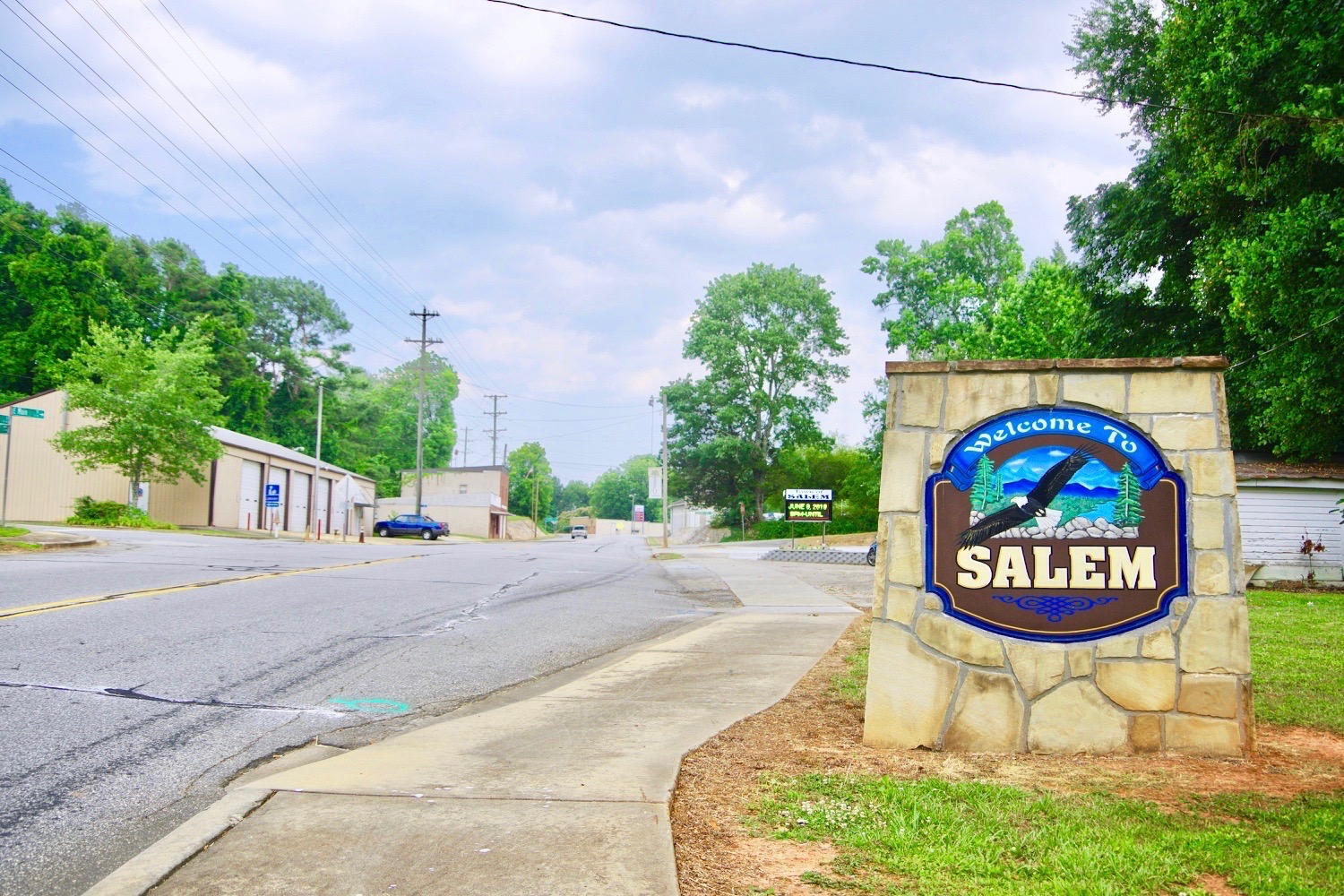
- Welcome sign along (SC 130)

- Location in Oconee County and the state of South Carolina.
- Coordinates: 34°53′17″N 82°58′31″W
- Country: United States
- State: South Carolina
- County: Oconee

Area
  - Total: 0.92 sq mi (2.37 km^{2})
  - Land: 0.92 sq mi (2.37 km^{2})
  - Water: 0 sq mi (0.00 km^{2})
- Elevation: 1,079 ft (329 m)

Population (2020)
  - Total: 120
  - Density: 131.1/sq mi (50.61/km^{2})
- Time zone: UTC-5 (Eastern (EST))
  - Summer (DST): UTC-4 (EDT)
- ZIP code: 29676
- Area codes: 864, 821
- FIPS code: 45-62980
- GNIS feature ID: 2407275
- Website: https://salemsc.us/

Salem is a U.S. town in Oconee County, South Carolina. The population was 120 at the 2020 United States census.

== Geography ==
Salem lies in the foothills of the Blue Ridge Mountains along South Carolina Highway 130, just south of its junction with South Carolina Highway 11. Lake Keowee and Keowee-Toxaway State Park lie just to the east, and Lake Jocassee and Devils Fork State Park lie to the northeast. The North Carolina-South Carolina border passes several miles north of Salem.

According to the United States Census Bureau, the town has a total area of 0.9 square miles (2.4 km^{2}), all of it land.

== Demographics ==
Historical population
Census	Pop.	Note	%±
1910	139		—
1960	206		—
1970	301		46.1%
1980	194		−35.5%
1990	192		−1.0%
2000	126		−34.4%
2010	135		7.1%
2020	120		−11.1%
U.S. Decennial Census

At the 2000 census there were 126 people, 54 households, and 36 families in the town. The population density was 150.5 inhabitants per square mile (58.1/km^{2}). There were 72 housing units at an average density of 86.0 per square mile (33.2/km^{2}). The racial makeup of the town was 95.24% White, 0.79% African American and 3.97% Native American. Of the 54 households 31.5% had children under the age of 18 living with them, 59.3% were married couples living together, 7.4% had a female householder with no husband present, and 33.3% were non-families. 31.5% of households were one person and 22.2% were one person aged 65 or older. The average household size was 2.33 and the average family size was 2.94.

The age distribution was 23.8% under the age of 18, 7.9% from 18 to 24, 27.8% from 25 to 44, 18.3% from 45 to 64, and 22.2% 65 or older. The median age was 40 years. For every 100 females, there were 85.3 males. For every 100 females age 18 and over, there were 77.8 males.

The median household income was $30,000 and the median family income was $33,125. Males had a median income of $35,000 versus $26,667 for females. The per capita income for the town was $14,980. There were 9.7% of families and 12.5% of the population living below the poverty line, including 11.1% of under eighteens and 18.8% of those over 64.

== Education ==
Salem has a lending library, a branch of the Oconee County Public Library.

== Notable person ==
- Sheri Biggs – U.S. representative
