= Chester State Park =

Park in South Carolina, U.S.

- Location within South Carolina
- Interactive map of Chester State Park
- Location: 759 State Park Rd, Chester, South Carolina 29706
- Coordinates: 34°40′51″N 81°14′38″W
- Area: 523 acres (2.1 km^{2})
- Created: 1935
- Open: 9:00am to 10:00pm
- Camp sites: Tent and RV sites, primitive group camping area
- Hiking trails: 1.3 miles (2 km) nature trail

Chester State Park is located near the town of Chester in Chester County, South Carolina. The 523-acre (2 km^{2}) park was developed by the Civilian Conservation Corps on land purchased in 1935.

The park's 523 acres include a 160-acre (65 ha) lake, a 450-foot (140 m) long fishing pier/walking bridge connecting the opposite sides of the lake, with a two-mile (3.2 km) nature trail that follows along the shoreline up to the Civilian Conservation Corps built stone spillway. Johnboat and canoe rentals are popular in the warmer months, and the park also offers a boat ramp for visitors with electric or hand-powered personal boats. Picnicking, rental picnic shelters and a large playground system are located along the shoreline. As of November 16, 2013, Chester State Park also offers the first SC State Park tournament sanctioned disc golf course. This 27 hole course has three loops suitable for professional, tournament play with 18 of these holes having alternative tee's for beginner/amateur level players.

Lakeview Hall, a fully enclosed meeting facility overlooking the park lake, is regularly used for weddings, reunions, and corporate meetings. Boy Scouts, church groups, and many other organized groups frequent the primitive group camping area throughout the year. Chester State Park's 25-site campground is open year-round and has many sites that may accommodate anything from single tents to 40-foot (12 m) RVs.

== See also ==
- List of South Carolina state parks
