= Turquoise darter =

Conservation status
- Least Concern (IUCN 3.1)

Scientific classification
- Kingdom: Animalia
- Phylum: Chordata
- Class: Actinopterygii
- Order: Perciformes
- Family: Percidae
- Genus: Etheostoma
- Species: E. inscriptum

Binomial name
- Etheostoma inscriptum (D. S. Jordan & Brayton, 1878)

Synonyms
- Nothonotus inscriptus D.S Jordan & Brayton

Species of fish

The turquoise darter (Etheostoma inscriptum) is a species of ray-finned fish, a darter from the subfamily Etheostomatinae, part of the family Percidae which includes the perches, ruffes and pike-perches. It is found in the Edisto, Savannah and Altamaha River drainages of North Carolina, South Carolina and Georgia in the United States. It inhabits rocky riffles of creeks and small to medium rivers. This species can reach a length of 8.0 cm (3.1 in), though most only reach about 6.0 cm (2.4 in).
