= Turtleback Falls =

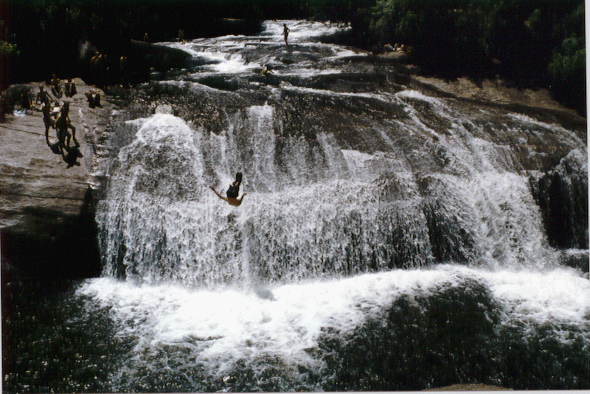
- Although dangerous, Swimming is a popular activity at Turtleback Falls
- Interactive map of Turtleback Falls
- Location: Horsepasture River, Pisgah National Forest, Blue Ridge Mountains, Transylvania County, North Carolina
- Coordinates: 35.0922°N 82.9663°W
- Type: Cascade
- Total height: 20 ft (6.1 m)
- Number of drops: 1

Turtleback Falls, also called Umbrella Falls, is a waterfall in Western North Carolina, located near Rosman. The falls is located on the Horsepasture River in the Pisgah National Forest. The falls is usually accessed by a hike starting in Gorges State Park which passes through Pisgah National Forest property.

Turtleback Falls is a popular place for swimming and people frequently slide over the falls into the Chug Hole during low water; however, the currents can be dangerous in higher flows and people have drowned at Turtleback, or have been swept downriver and over 125' Rainbow Falls.

== Geology ==
The falls has a large, deep pool at the bottom commonly known as the "Chug Hole". The river flows over a large, sloping slab of rock before curving steeper and finally dropping into the pool. The appearance of the rock, similar to a turtle's shell, gives the falls its name.

== Nearby waterfalls ==
- Little Falls - located on private property upstream from Drift Falls
- Narrows Falls - located in a gated community upstream from Drift Falls
- Rock House Falls - 55-ft falls located on private property on Burlingame Creek, a tributary of the Horsepasture River
- Rainbow Falls
- Drift Falls
- Stairway Falls
- Sidepocket Falls
- Windy Falls

== See also ==
- List of waterfalls
- List of waterfalls in North Carolina
