= Devils Fork State Park =

State park in South Carolina, United States

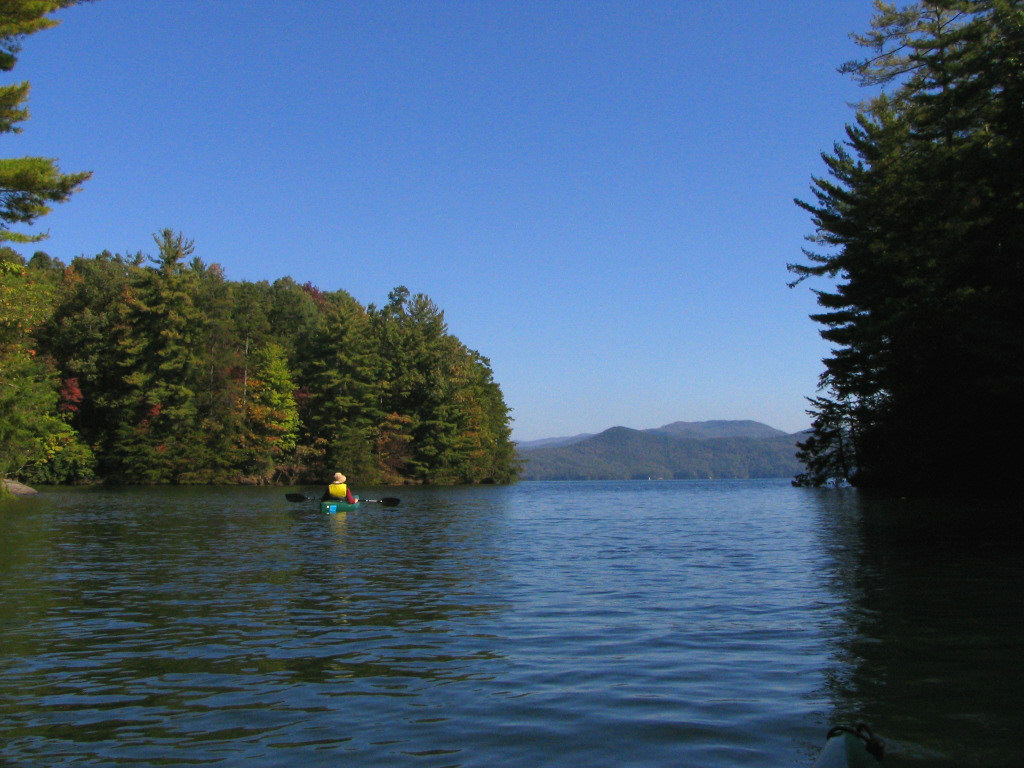
- Lake Jocassee in Devils Fork State Park
- Interactive map of Devils Fork State Park
- Nearest city: Salem, South Carolina
- Coordinates: 34°57′10.5″N 82°56′51.5″W
- Area: 622 acres (2.5 km^{2})
- Created: 1990
- Camp sites: Regular campgrounds, primitive boat-in, and RV sites are available
- Hiking trails: 2
- Other information: Boating, fishing, many species of fish, including rainbow trout.

Devils Fork State Park is in northwestern South Carolina on the eastern edge of the Sumter National Forest at the edge of 7,500-acre (3,035 ha) Lake Jocassee. It is located three miles (5 km) off SC 11, the Cherokee Scenic Highway, near the town of Salem, South Carolina.

The park offers hiking, camping (including several paddle-in primitive sites), canoeing and kayaking. The park is well known for rainbow and brown trout, as well as largemouth, smallmouth, and white bass, crappie, bream and catfish. The park has accommodations for scuba divers, including a walk-in ramp; thirty foot visibility is common, and due to the lake's recent creation, roads, houses, signs and other marks of human habitation can be seen on the lake bottom.

The 622-acre (2.5 km^{2}) park was created in 1990. The park has many small waterfalls that feed lake Jocassee, and is home to the Oconee Bell, a wildflower indigenous to North and South Carolina that grows throughout the park; more than 90 percent of the world population of these delicate white and pink flowers is found in the park.
