= Lake Hartwell State Park =

State park in South Carolina, United States

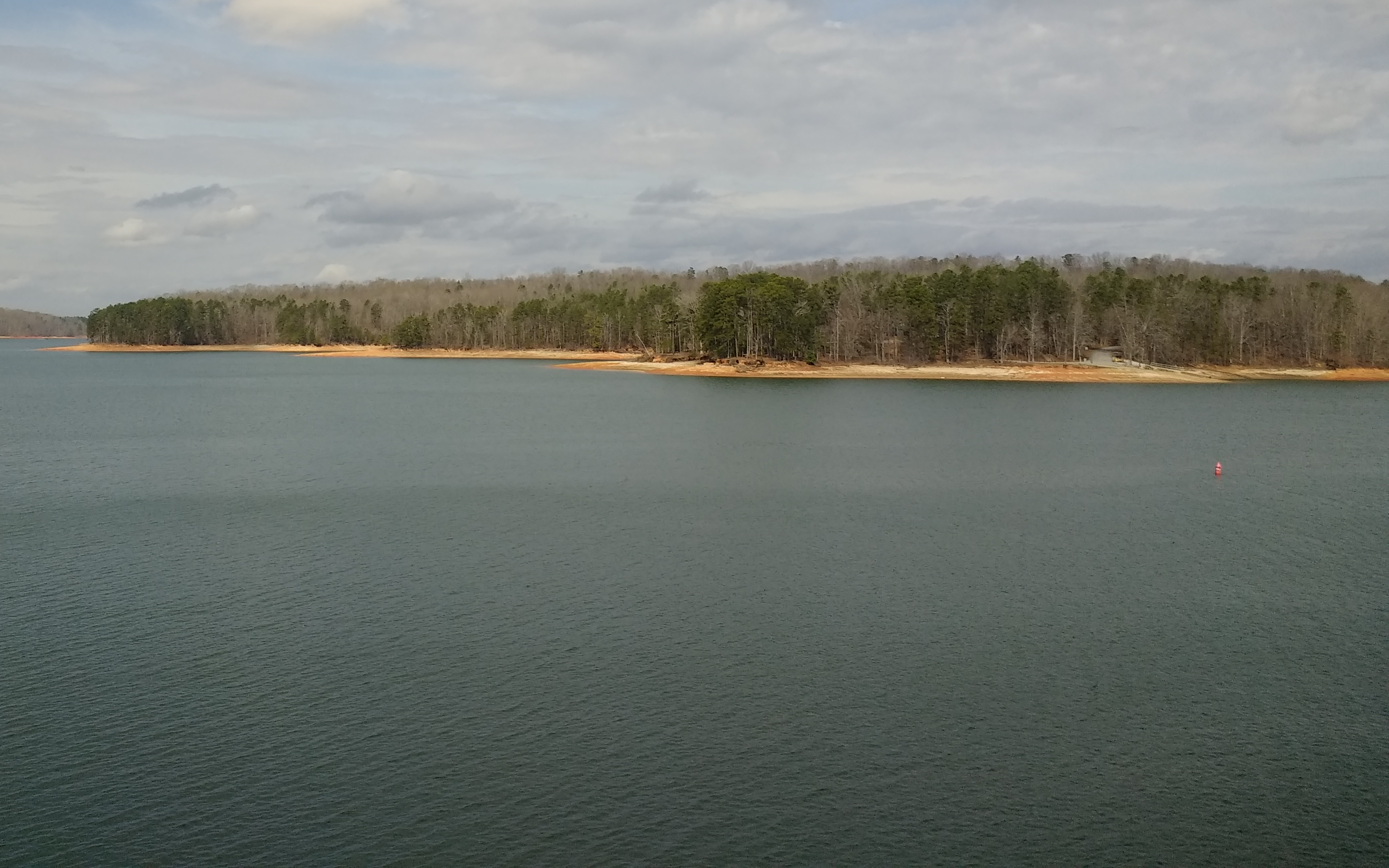
- Interactive map of Lake Hartwell State Park
- Nearest city: Fair Play, SC
- Coordinates: 34°29′41″N 83°01′54″W
- Area: 680 acres (3 km^{2})
- Created: 1976
- Camp sites: tent, RV, cabins
- Hiking trails: yes
- Website: http://southcarolinaparks.com/lakehartwell/introduction.aspx

Lake Hartwell State Park, formerly known as Lake Hartwell State Recreation Area, is a park located in Oconee County, South Carolina, near the community of Fair Play. The park was created in 1976, the majority on land leased from the United States Army Corps of Engineers with a small portion of land purchased from various private owners.

The 680-acre (3 km^{2}) park has 14 miles of shoreline on Lake Hartwell. Two boat ramps provide boaters access to the lake. While the park focuses on fishing and boating, it also has a playground, areas for picnicking, hiking trails and sites for camping. Two cabins are also available for rental throughout the year. An information center features a display of vintage fishing equipment.
