= Bad Creek Hydroelectric Station =

- Overview of the reservoirs
- Interactive map of Bad Creek Hydroelectric Station
- Country: United States
- Location: Oconee County, near Salem, South Carolina
- Coordinates: 35°00′24″N 82°59′40″W
- Status: Operational
- Opening date: 1991
- Owner: Duke Energy

Upper reservoir
- Creates: Bad Creek Reservoir

Lower reservoir
- Creates: Lake Jocassee

Power Station
- Turbines: 4 x 266 MW (357,000 hp) Francis pump turbines
- Installed capacity: 1,065 MW (1,428,000 hp)

The Bad Creek Hydroelectric Station is a pumped-storage hydroelectric power station located 8 miles (13 km) north of Salem in Oconee County, South Carolina. The 1,065-megawatt (1,428,000 hp) power plant is owned by Duke Energy, and its last generator was commissioned in 1991.

The power station generates electricity by shifting water between an upper and lower reservoir. The upper Bad Creek Reservoir was created by damming Bad Creek and West Bad Creek, while Lake Jocassee serves as the lower reservoir. During periods of low energy demand, the four 266-megawatt (357,000 hp) Francis pump turbines pump water from Lake Jocassee, at an elevation of 1,110 feet (340 m), to the Bad Creek Reservoir at an elevation of 2,310 ft (704 m) through a 1-mile (1.6 km) tunnel. When energy demand is high, water is released back from Bad Creek Reservoir back down to the pump-turbines, which then operate as generators. After electricity is produced, the water is returned to Lake Jocassee. The process is repeated as needed, primarily with the facility serving as a peaking power plant.
