= Oconee Station State Historic Site =

Blockhouse of the historic South Carolina frontier

- Oconee blockhouse
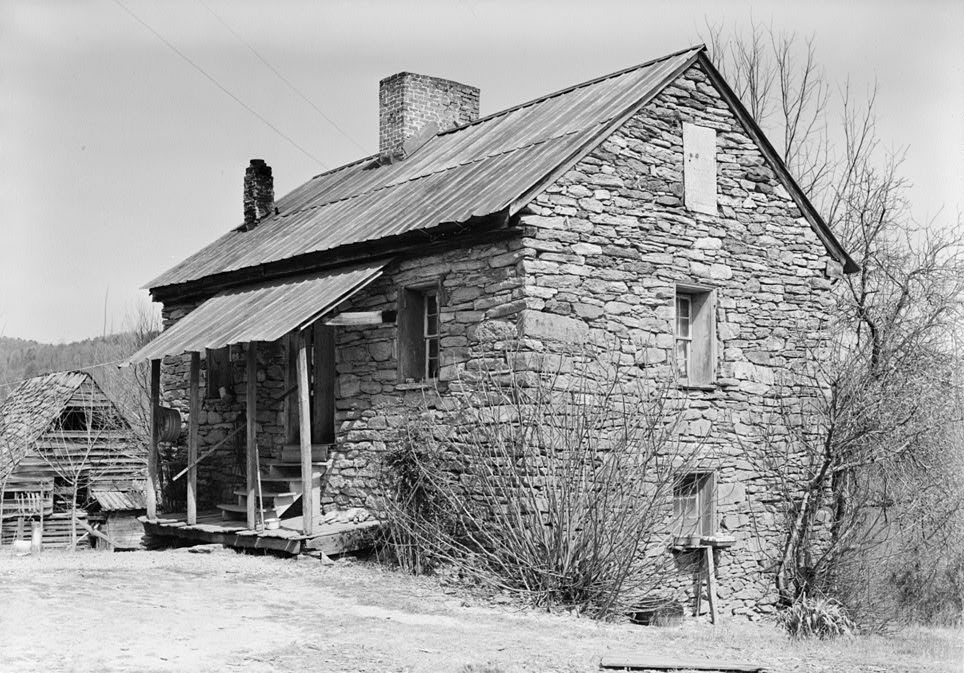
- Oconee Station blockhouse
- Interactive map of Oconee Station State Historic Site
- Nearest city: Walhalla, South Carolina
- Area: 210 acres (0.85 km^{2})
- Created: 1792
- Hiking trails: Spur trail to Oconee Passage of Palmetto Trail
- Other information: Spur trail to Station Cove Falls
- Oconee Station and Richards House
- U.S. National Register of Historic Places
- Location within South Carolina Location within the United States
- Nearest city: Walhalla, South Carolina
- Coordinates: 34°50′46″N 83°4′14″W
- Area: 5 acres (2.0 ha)
- Built: 1760
- NRHP reference No.: 71000792
- Added to NRHP: February 24, 1971

Oconee Station was established in 1792 as a blockhouse on the frontier of the US state of South Carolina. Troops were removed in 1799. The site also encompasses the Williams Richards House, which was built in the early 19th century as a residence and trading post. The site is listed on the National Register of Historic Places in 1971 as Oconee Station and Richards House.

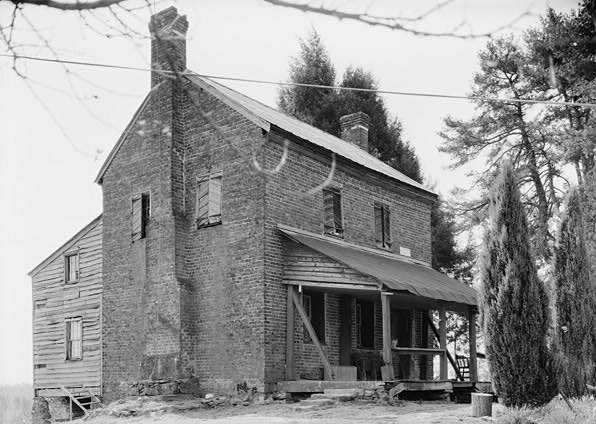
William Richards house at Oconee Station

There is a short spur trail to Station Cove Falls, which is a 60 ft (18 m) waterfall, and the Oconee Passage of the Palmetto Trail.

The Oconee Station and the William Richards House were photographed by Jack Boucher of the Historic American Buildings Survey in 1960. Both structures are open for tours on weekends and by appointment. Admission is free.
