= Whitewater River (Keowee River tributary) =

Stream in North Carolina, USA

Whitewater River Tributary to Keowee River
- Location of Hyco River mouth Whitewater River (Keowee River tributary) (the United States)

Location
- Country: United States
- State: North Carolina; South Carolina
- County: Oconee (SC); Jackson (NC); Transylvania (NC)

Physical characteristics
- Source: divide between Whitewater River and Chattooga River
  - location: about 0.5 miles south of Chimneytop Mountain
  - coordinates: 35°05′29″N 083°03′54″W
  - elevation: 3,550 ft (1,080 m)
- Mouth: Keowee River
  - location: Lake Jocassee
  - coordinates: 34°58′35″N 082°56′03″W
  - elevation: 1,108 ft (338 m)
- Length: 12.08 mi (19.44 km)
- Basin size: 16.97 square miles (44.0 km^{2})
- Discharge
  - location: Keowee River (Lake Jocassee)
  - average: 75.70 cu ft/s (2.144 m^{3}/s) at mouth with Keowee River

Basin features
- Progression: northwest
- River system: Keowee River
- Tributaries
  - left: Silver Run; Happy Hollow; Democrat Creek; Waddle Branch; Corbin Creek
  - right: Little Whitewater River
- Waterbodies: Lake Jocassee
- Bridges: NC 107 (x2), Whitewater Road

Person kayaking down the "Mini Gorge" on the Whitewater River.

The Whitewater River is a 14.6-mile-long (23.5 km) river that flows south from headwaters in Transylvania County, North Carolina, over Upper Whitewater Falls and Lower Whitewater Falls before crossing into South Carolina and entering Lake Jocassee, the reservoir behind Lake Jocassee Dam.

In Lake Jocassee the Whitewater River is joined by the Toxaway River to form the Keowee River. The confluence is submerged beneath the waters of Lake Jocassee. Via the Keowee and Seneca rivers, the Whitewater River is part of the Savannah River watershed.
