= Upper Whitewater Falls =

Waterfall in North Carolina, US

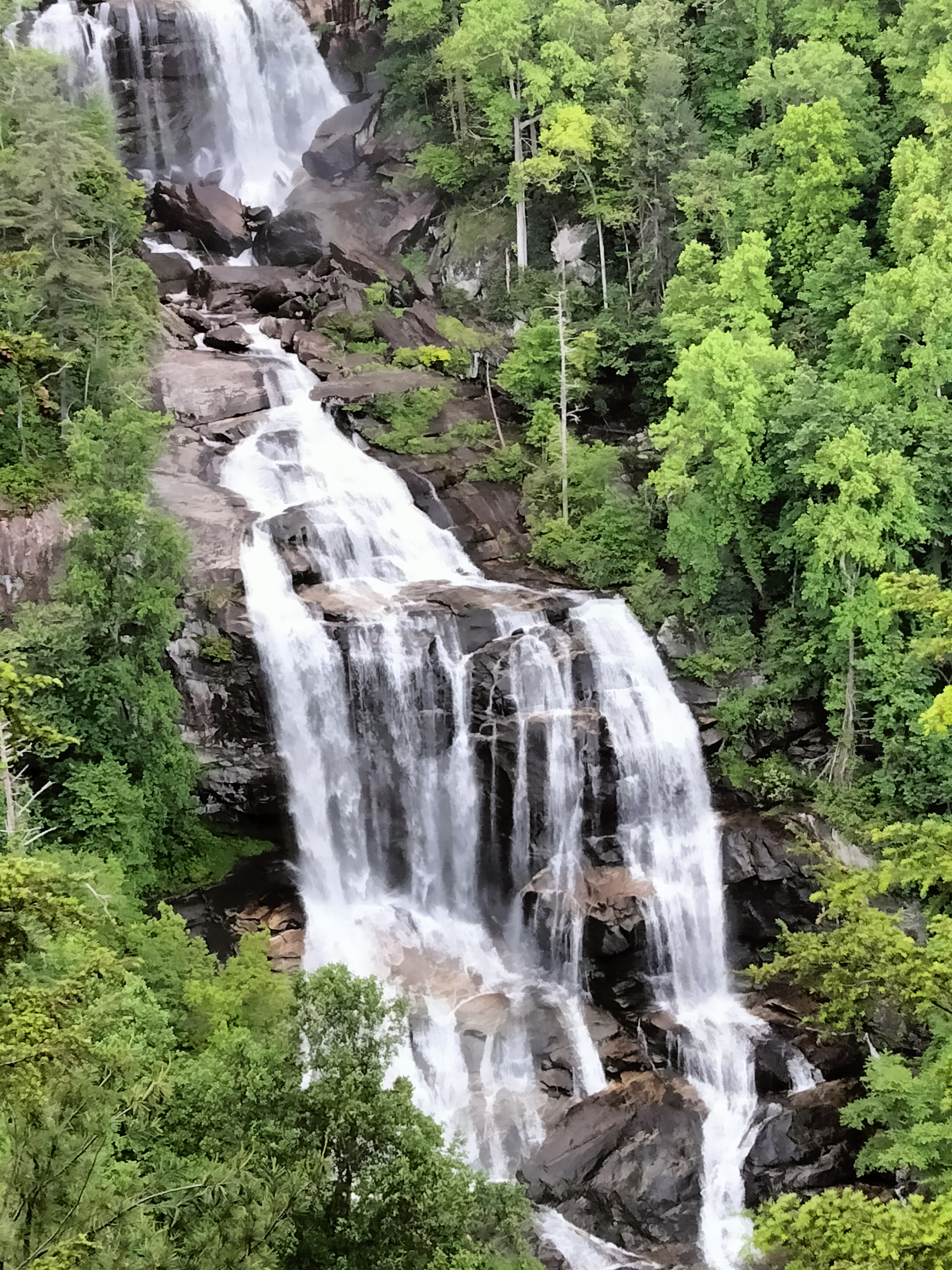
- Upper Whitewater Falls in May 2024
- Interactive map of Upper Whitewater Falls
- Location: Whitewater River, Jackson County / Transylvania County, in the Blue Ridge Mountains of North Carolina
- Coordinates: 35.035825°N 83.017544°W
- Type: Tiered, Cascade
- Total height: 411 ft (125 m)

Upper Whitewater Falls is a waterfall in North Carolina on the Whitewater River. As with most of North Carolina's waterfalls, it is in the mountainous area of the state. There is a cluster of falls in the area where the borders of Georgia and the Carolinas come together. Whitewater Falls is part of that group, very close to the South Carolina border.

According to the U.S. Forest Service, "With a 411-foot plunge, Upper Whitewater Falls in North Carolina is the highest waterfall east of the Rockies." However, this claim is likely exaggerated, and the actual height is likely closer to 350–400 feet. Furthermore, several other waterfalls have contended to be the highest waterfall east of the Rockies, including Crabtree Falls in Virginia, Amicalola Falls in Georgia, and Glassmine Falls in North Carolina, which depends on the way waterfalls are defined and categorized.

== Natural history ==
A short film of Whitewater Falls after copious rainfall, July 2013.

The waterfall is protected by the Nantahala National Forest. Although some claim that Whitewater Falls is simply the tallest East of the Mississippi, that title may belong to Crabtree Falls in Virginia, depending on how one defines "waterfall". In fact, there is debate as to whether Whitewater falls is the tallest waterfall in North Carolina, as there are some in the state which may lay claim to being even taller, such as Glassmine Falls on the Blue Ridge Parkway.

There is a Lower Whitewater Falls in South Carolina about 2 miles downstream from Upper Whitewater Falls.

== Visiting the Falls ==
Visitors to the falls must pay a $3/vehicle fee to view the falls. There are several viewing platforms at varying heights that offer different views of the falls.

The area surrounding the falls is sufficiently treacherous that hiking off-trail in the area is strongly discouraged by park rangers.

The Foothills Trail passes through the base of the falls.

== Nearby falls ==
Corbin Creek Falls

== See also ==
- List of waterfalls
- List of waterfalls in North Carolina
