= Toxaway River =

Stream in North Carolina, USA

Toxaway River Tributary to Keowee River
- Location of Toxaway River mouth Toxaway River (the United States)

Location
- Country: United States
- State: North Carolina; South Carolina
- Counties: Transylvania (NC); Oconee (SC); Pickens (SC)

Physical characteristics
- Source: divide between Toxaway River and Greenland Creek
  - location: about 0.5 miles southeast of Cold Mountain Gap
  - coordinates: 35°09′03″N 082°59′21″W
  - elevation: 4,000 ft (1,200 m)
- Mouth: Keowee River (Lake Jocassee)
  - location: Lake Jocassee
  - coordinates: 34°58′36″N 082°56′05″W
  - elevation: 1,108 ft (338 m)
- Length: 21.31 mi (34.30 km)
- Basin size: 146.73 square miles (380.0 km^{2})
- Discharge
  - location: Keowee River (Lake Jocassee)
  - average: 508.41 cu ft/s (14.397 m^{3}/s) at mouth with Keowee River

Basin features
- Progression: generally south
- River system: Savannah River
- Tributaries
  - left: Indian Creek; Panther Branch; Auger Fork; Toxaway Creek; Rock Creek; Laurel Fork Creek; Devils Hole Creek
  - right: Mill Creek; Deep Ford Creek; Bear Meadow Creek; Cobb Creek; Horsepasture River
- Waterfalls: Toxaway Falls
- Bridges: Long Ridge Road, Cardinal Drive, Cold Mountain Road, NC 281

The Toxaway River is a 21.4-mile-long (34.4 km) waterway that flows south from headwaters in Transylvania County, North Carolina, into Lake Toxaway and over Toxaway Falls, after which it crosses into South Carolina and enters Lake Jocassee, the reservoir behind Lake Jocassee Dam.

In Lake Jocassee the Toxaway River is joined by the Whitewater River to form the Keowee River. The confluence is submerged beneath the waters of Lake Jocassee. Via the Keowee and Seneca rivers, the Toxaway River is part of the Savannah River watershed.

== Variant names ==
According to the Geographic Names Information System, it has also been known historically as:

- Jocassa River
- Jocassee River
- Keowee River
