= Lake Jocassee =

Man-made lake in northwestern South Carolina, United States

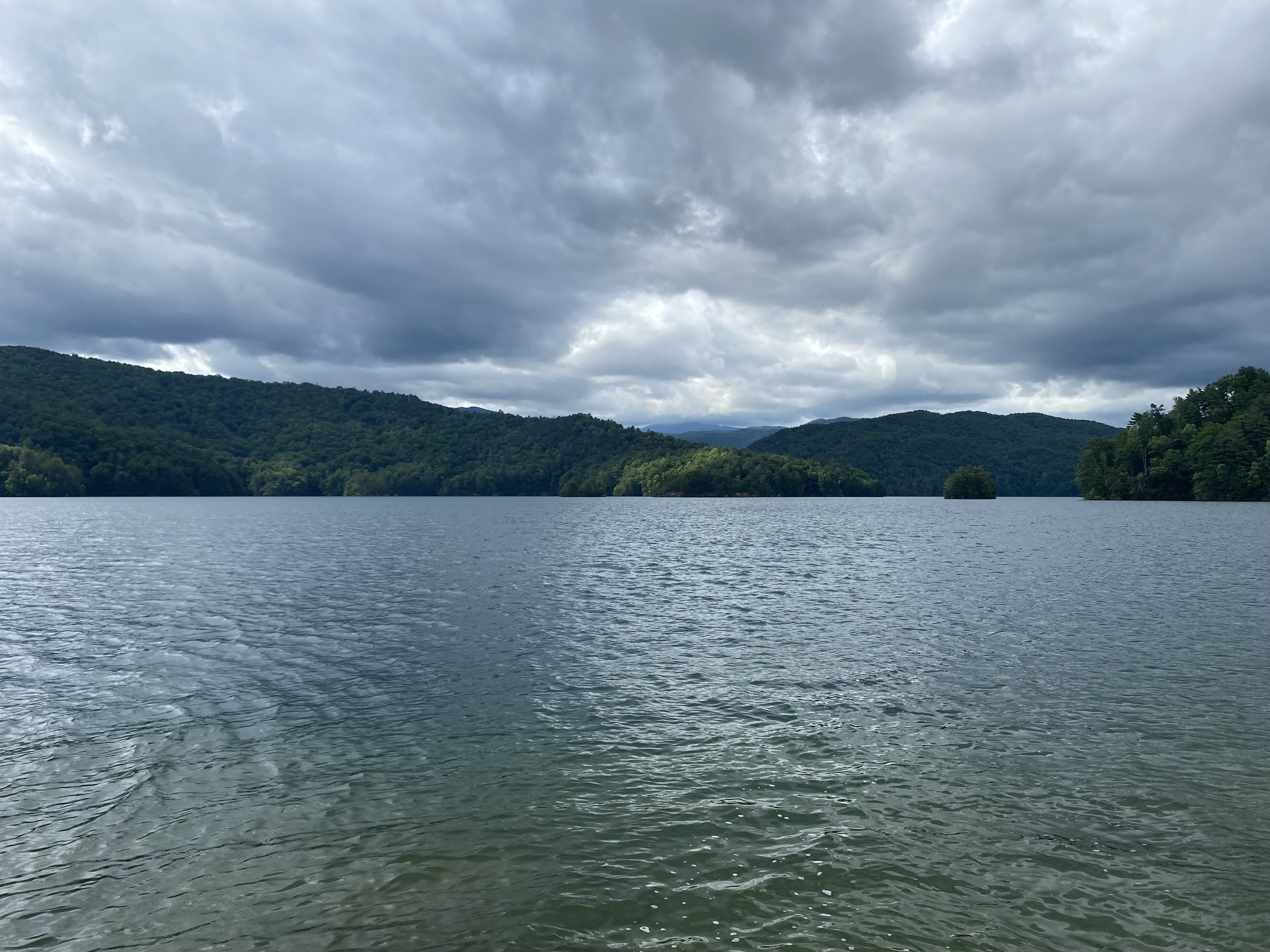

- Location within South Carolina
- Location: Oconee / Pickens counties, South Carolina, United States
- Coordinates: 34°57′36″N 82°55′10″W
- Type: Reservoir
- Primary inflows: Horsepasture, Toxaway, Whitewater, Thompson Rivers
- Primary outflows: Keowee River
- Basin countries: United States
- Surface area: 7,500 acres (30 km^{2})
- Average depth: 158 ft (48 m)
- Max. depth: 326 ft (99 m)
- Shore length^{1}: 75 mi (121 km)
- Surface elevation: 1,100 ft (340 m)
- Frozen: No
- Islands: Dozen small islets
- Settlements: Clemson, Pickens, Salem, and Seneca
- ^{1} Shore length is not a well-defined measure.

Lake Jocassee (/dʒəˈkæsi/, /dʒoʊˈkæsi/) is a 7,500-acre (30 km^{2}), 300-foot (91 m) deep reservoir in northwest South Carolina. It was created in 1973 by the state in partnership with Duke Power. The lake is known for the clean and cold Appalachian mountain rivers that flow into it, keeping its waters cool and clear year-round. The Jocassee Dam, which forms the lake, is 385 feet (117 m) high and 1,750 feet (530 m) long. The lake is within Devils Fork State Park.

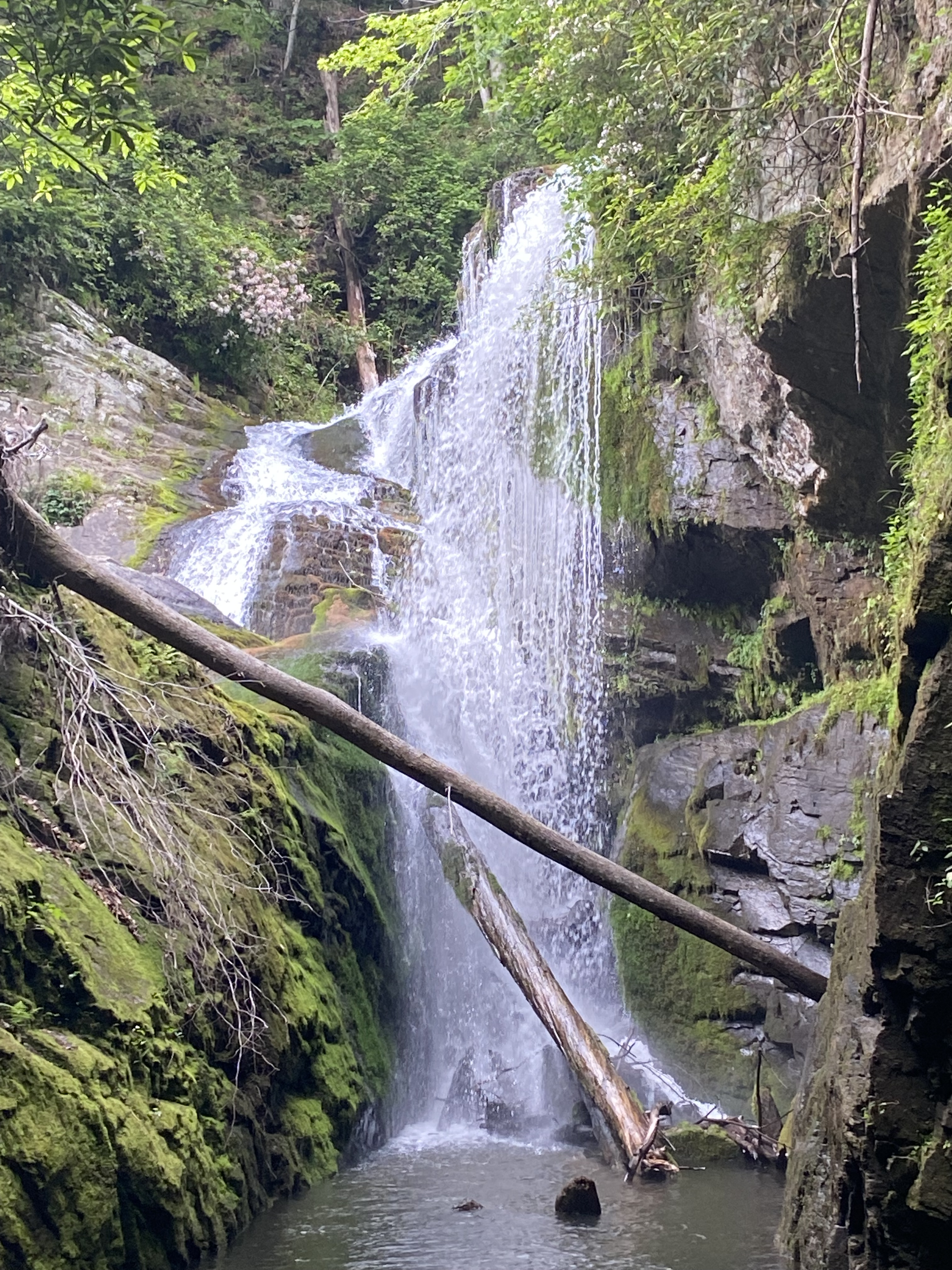
Laurel Fork Falls

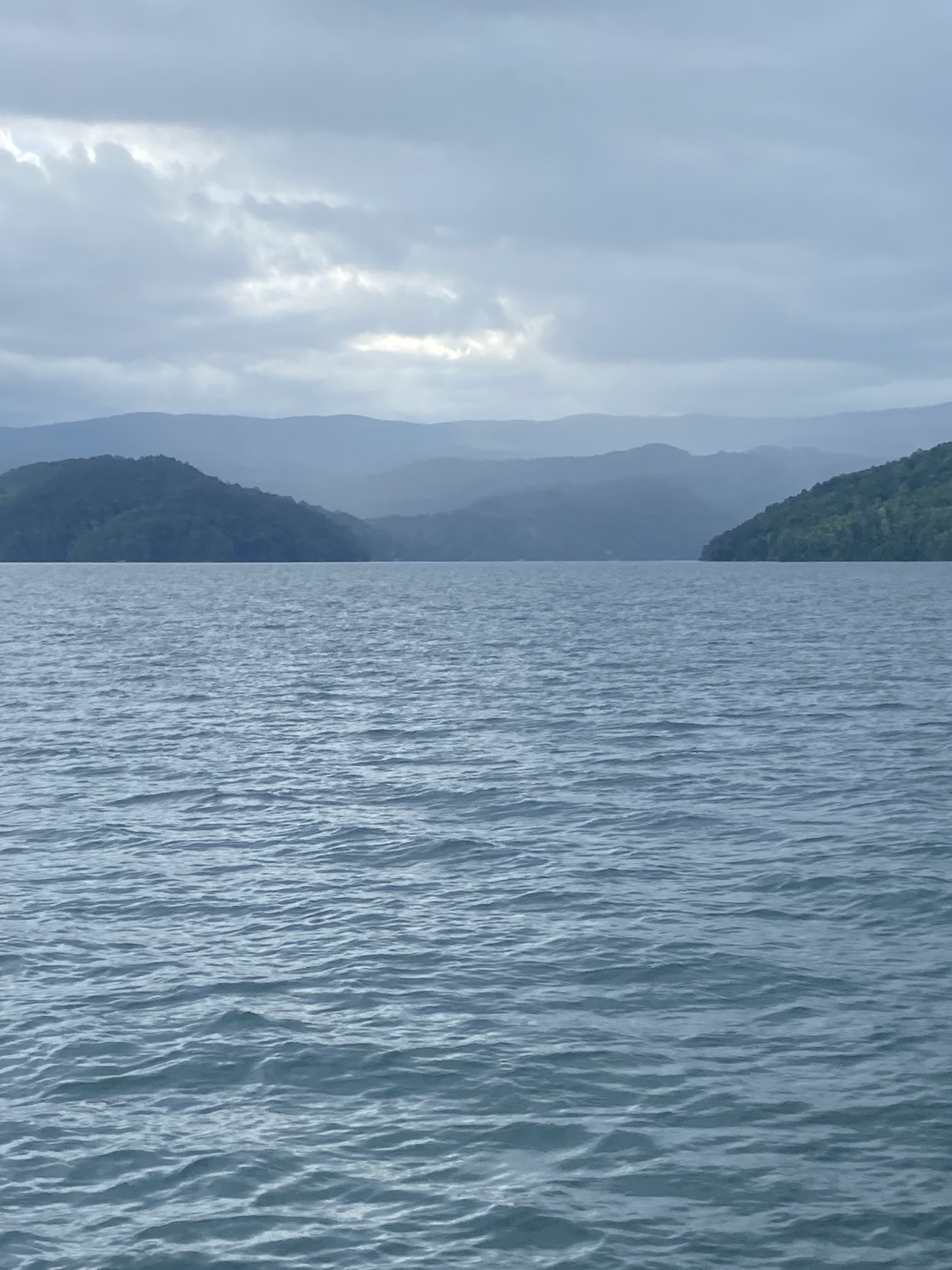
Looking toward Cashiers

Although most manmade structures were demolished before the lake was flooded, divers recently discovered the remains of a lodge that was left intact; it is now below 300 feet (91 m) of water. Mount Carmel Baptist Church Cemetery was a setting for a scene in the film Deliverance (1972), starring Burt Reynolds and Jon Voight, produced before the lake was flooded. The site is now covered by 130 feet (40 m) of lake water.

Several waterfalls flow directly into the lake, including Laurel Fork Falls, Mill Creek Falls, Wright Fork Falls, and Moondance Falls.

== Hydrology ==
Lake Jocassee and the surrounding bodies of water.

A confluence of four rivers supplies Lake Jocassee's water. The furthest west of the rivers, the Whitewater River, flows southeast until it meets the northwest corner of Lake Jocassee. The Thompson River flows due south until it too reaches the lake in the northwest corner. The Horsepasture River feeds the lake from the northeast corner, along with the Toxaway River, which is east of the Horsepasture River.

The Jocassee Hydro Station, located in the southeast corner of Lake Jocassee, separates it from the beginning of Lake Keowee, which has overtaken the underlying Keowee River. On the southern border of Lake Keowee is the city of Seneca, developed prior to the lake. The old mill town of Newry, constructed on the banks of the Keowee River, is now along the lake border. Unlike Lake Jocassee, Lake Keowee has become densely settled. As most of the land adjacent to Lake Jocassee is owned by Duke Power and the State of South Carolina, they have kept it undeveloped.

Climate data for JOCASSEE 8 WNW (2004-2024)
Month	Jan	Feb	Mar	Apr	May	Jun	Jul	Aug	Sep	Oct	Nov	Dec	Year
Record high °F (°C)	71.0 (21.7)	73.0 (22.8)	82.0 (27.8)	85.0 (29.4)	87.0 (30.6)	92.0 (33.3)	93.0 (33.9)	93.0 (33.9)	88.0 (31.1)	87.0 (30.6)	77.0 (25.0)	74.0 (23.3)	93.0 (33.9)
Mean daily maximum °F (°C)	48.3 (9.1)	51.6 (10.9)	57.7 (14.3)	66.2 (19.0)	71.9 (22.2)	77.8 (25.4)	80.4 (26.9)	79.8 (26.6)	74.8 (23.8)	66.9 (19.4)	58.7 (14.8)	50.3 (10.2)	65.4 (18.6)
Daily mean °F (°C)	37.0 (2.8)	39.6 (4.2)	44.9 (7.2)	52.7 (11.5)	59.7 (15.4)	66.6 (19.2)	69.8 (21.0)	69.3 (20.7)	63.7 (17.6)	54.0 (12.2)	45.5 (7.5)	39.1 (3.9)	53.5 (11.9)
Mean daily minimum °F (°C)	25.6 (−3.6)	27.7 (−2.4)	32.2 (0.1)	39.1 (3.9)	47.4 (8.6)	55.5 (13.1)	59.3 (15.2)	58.8 (14.9)	52.6 (11.4)	41.1 (5.1)	32.2 (0.1)	27.8 (−2.3)	41.6 (5.3)
Record low °F (°C)	1.0 (−17.2)	3.0 (−16.1)	10.0 (−12.2)	19.0 (−7.2)	28.0 (−2.2)	41.0 (5.0)	45.0 (7.2)	46.0 (7.8)	36.0 (2.2)	23.0 (−5.0)	10.0 (−12.2)	−1.0 (−18.3)	−1.0 (−18.3)
Average precipitation inches (mm)	8.08 (205)	6.24 (158)	7.30 (185)	6.66 (169)	6.55 (166)	7.78 (198)	7.09 (180)	8.87 (225)	7.64 (194)	6.40 (163)	7.05 (179)	7.68 (195)	87.34 (2,218)
Average snowfall inches (cm)	1.4 (3.6)	0.7 (1.8)	0.2 (0.51)	0.0 (0.0)	0.0 (0.0)	0.0 (0.0)	0.0 (0.0)	0.0 (0.0)	0.0 (0.0)	0.0 (0.0)	0.0 (0.0)	1.2 (3.0)	3.5 (8.9)
Average precipitation days (≥ 0.01 in)	8.9	8.7	10.0	9.6	10.5	12.8	12.4	12.8	9.6	7.1	8.2	9.3	119.9
Average snowy days (≥ 0.1 in)	0.5	0.3	0.1	0.0	0.0	0.0	0.0	0.0	0.0	0.0	0.0	0.2	1.1
Source: ClimateAtlas

== Natural history ==
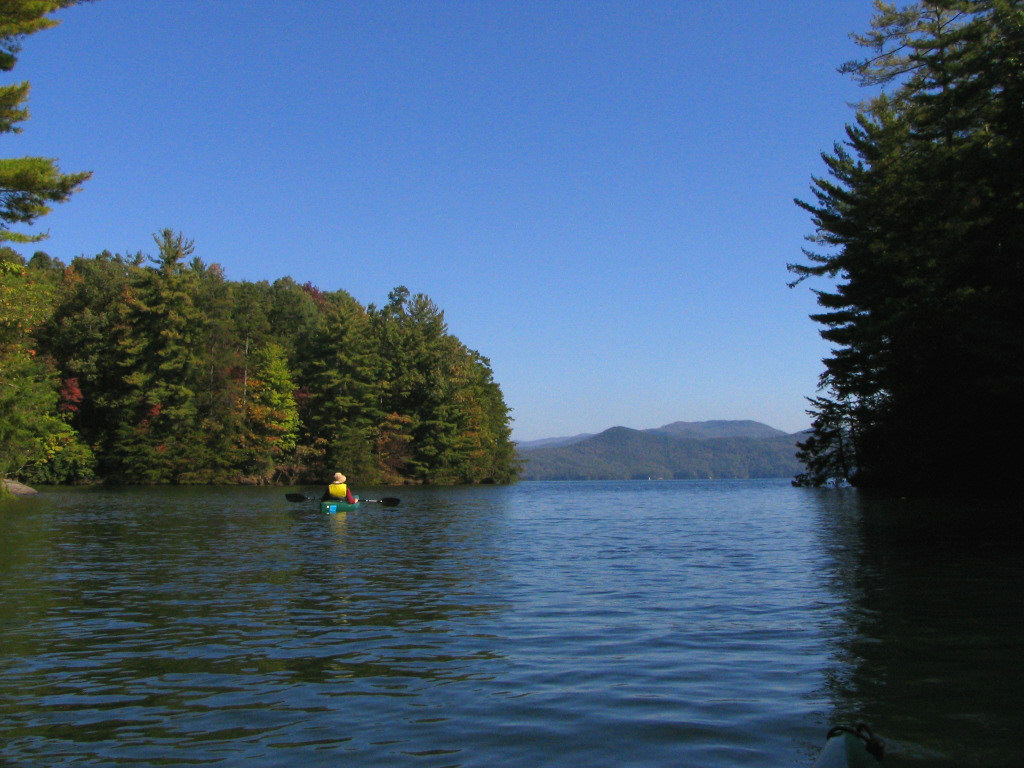
Devils Fork State Park portion of Lake Jocassee

A rare wildflower, the Oconee Bell (Shortia galacifolia), native to only a few counties in the Blue Ridge area, was discovered in the region in 1788 by French botanist André Michaux. The flooding of a large area by Lake Jocassee is said to have caused the destruction of the heart of the species' range. More recently, biologists have documented the occurrence of a number of rare, threatened and endangered species in this area. The Eastatoee Gorge Heritage Preserve was transferred from Duke Power Company to the South Carolina Department of Natural Resources in 1979 due to the extremely diverse flora occurring there.

Wildlife management efforts in the Jocassee Gorges area began as early as the 1930s when the Chief Game Warden managed the stocking of trout from the Cleveland State Fish Hatchery, Table Rock State Hatchery, and the Walhalla National Fish Hatchery. The state began to investigate and improve fish populations in the area. People hiking, hunting, fishing, or nature watching benefit from the fish stocking and law enforcement of the Game Management Program (now WMA).

Bonaparte's gulls and common loons have been recorded fishing together on Lake Jocassee, with the loons driving fish to the surface from below and the gulls pushing the fish down from above. This behavior has rarely been observed in freshwater environments.

== History ==
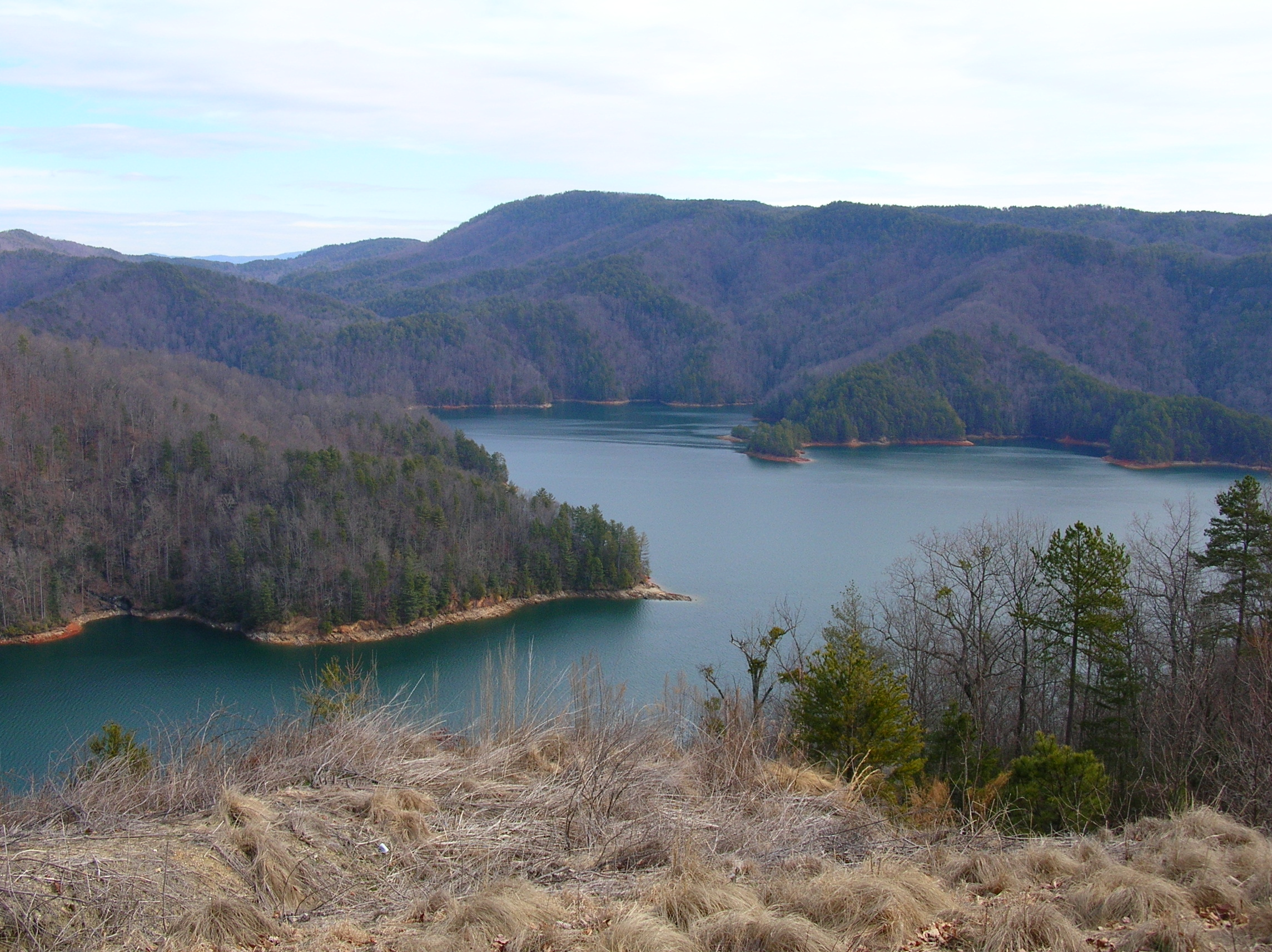
Lake Jocassee from the Bad Creek entrance to the lake

The name Jocassee comes from a Cherokee legend about a maiden of that name. An Oconee tribe, the "Brown Vipers" led by Chief Attakulla, inhabited the west side of the Whitewater River, while a rival tribe, "The Green Birds", lived on the east. Legend says that a young Green Bird warrior, Nagoochee, was not afraid to enter Brown Viper hunting grounds. On one occasion, he fell and broke his leg and was convinced he was going to die. He then heard Jocassee, Attakulla's daughter, who returned him to her father's lodge and nursed him back to health. Jocassee eventually fell in love with him. In a later battle, Cheochee, Jocassee's brother, killed the Green Bird warrior and brought Nagoochee's head back on his belt. Legend has it that Jocassee went into the water and did not sink but walked across the water to meet the ghost of Nagoochee. The name Jocassee means "Place of the Lost One."

The Jocassee Gorges area was once part of the Cherokee Nation homelands. It now lies 300 feet (91 m) beneath the surface of the lake, near the Toxaway River. Nearby Keowee Town was a major hub in the Cherokee Path that connected Cherokee towns and villages throughout the area. Early 18th-century traders worked with the Cherokee, and delivered as many as 200,000 deerskins annually to Charleston, South Carolina. They supplied the local Cherokee in trade with European firearms, ammunition, metal tools, and clothing.

However, mounting discord between the English and Cherokee led to war in 1759, during the tensions of the French and Indian War in which the English were engaged. Following the American Revolutionary War, in which rebel colonial militia repeatedly attacked Cherokee towns because of their alliance with the British, the Cherokee were forced to cede large areas of territory. In 1785, General Andrew Pickens hosted a large gathering of Cherokee chiefs; they signed a treaty ceding all of the Jocassee gorges area, with the exception of northern Oconee County, to the United States. The Cherokee did not cede the Oconee mountains until 1815.

Settlers from the British Isles, mostly of Scottish and Irish descent, came from the backcountry of Virginia and Pennsylvania to this area, as well as from Charleston. United States and South Carolina land grants to European Americans in the Jocassee area date to 1791.

== Fishing ==
Lake Jocassee holds state records for five species of fish, including three in the sunfish family (Centrarchidae). In 2001, a 5 lb 2.5 oz (2.34 kg) Redeye bass and a 9 lb 7 oz (4.3 kg) Smallmouth bass were caught. An 8 lb 2 oz (3.7 kg) Spotted bass was caught in 1996. The last two came from the salmon family (Salmonidae). A 17 lb 9.5 oz (7.98 kg) Brown trout was caught in 1987 and an 11 lb 5 oz (5.1 kg) Rainbow trout was caught in 1993.

== Economy ==
The Jocassee Hydro Station, owned by Duke Energy, is located between Lake Jocassee and Lake Keowee; it is a 610-megawatt, pumped storage facility. Near the Whitewater River, Bad Creek Hydroelectric Station is a 1,065-megawatt pumped-storage facility that started generating electricity in 1991 and is also owned by Duke. Both facilities provide jobs for residents of the surrounding area.

== Nearby cities and towns ==
- Salem, South Carolina- pop. 126

== See also ==
- Lake Keowee
- List of lakes in South Carolina
