= National Register of Historic Places listings in Greenville County, South Carolina =

Location of Greenville County in South Carolina

This is a list of the National Register of Historic Places listings in Greenville County, South Carolina outside the city of Greenville.

This is intended to be a complete list of the properties and districts on the National Register of Historic Places in Greenville County, South Carolina, United States. The locations of National Register properties and districts for which the latitude and longitude coordinates are included below, may be seen in a map.

There are 96 properties and districts listed on the National Register in the county. Listings in the city of Greenville are listed separately, while the 48 properties and districts in the remaining parts of the county are listed here. Another property in Greenville County outside Greenville was once listed but has been removed.

This National Park Service list is complete through NPS recent listings posted June 19, 2026.

== Current listings ==
	Name on the Register	Image	Date listed	Location	City or town	Description
1	American Spinning Company Mill No. 2	American Spinning Company Mill No. 2	October 18, 2016 (#16000730)	300 Hammett St. 34°52′24″N 82°24′44″W	Greenville	
2	Arthur Barnwell House	Arthur Barnwell House	March 19, 1982 (#82003867)	South of Greer on South Carolina Highway 14; 34°51′18″N 82°13′41″W	Greer	
3	William Bates House	William Bates House	December 4, 1978 (#78002512)	East of Greenville on South Carolina Highway 14; 34°50′53″N 82°14′04″W	Greenville	
4	Brandon Mill	Brandon Mill	September 3, 2014 (#14000317)	25 Draper St. 34°50′39″N 82°25′53″W	Greenville	
5	Burdette Building	Burdette Building	July 17, 2003 (#03000660)	104 E. Curtis St. 34°44′14″N 82°15′19″W	Simpsonville	
6	Campbell's Covered Bridge	Campbell's Covered Bridge	July 1, 2009 (#09000483)	123 Campbell Covered Bridge Rd. 35°05′09″N 82°15′51″W	Gowensville	
7	Cannon Building	Cannon Building	September 28, 2005 (#05001100)	100 N. Main St. 34°41′37″N 82°11′59″W	Fountain Inn	
8	Conestee Mill	Conestee Mill	March 2, 2014 (#09000913)	1 Spanco Dr. 34°46′13″N 82°20′51″W	Conestee	
9	Cureton-Huff House	Cureton-Huff House	January 13, 1983 (#83002196)	Southwest of Simpsonville off S-272 (West Georgia Road); 34°41′34″N 82°20′02″W	Simpsonville	
10	Davenport House	Davenport House	February 1, 1999 (#98001623)	100 Randall St. 34°56′10″N 82°13′37″W	Greer	
11	Dunean Mill Historic District	Dunean Mill Historic District	February 4, 2019 (#100003418)	Bounded by Madden, Allen, Whitten & Hutchins Sts. 34°49′35″N 82°25′16″W	Dunean	
12	Earle-Morgan Cabin at Clark's Mountain	Earle-Morgan Cabin at Clark's Mountain	September 24, 2025 (#100012294)	335 Clark's Mountain Road; 35°11′06″N 82°14′02″W	Landrum	
13	Ellison Flour Mill	Ellison Flour Mill	October 11, 2022 (#100008251)	100 Ellison St. 34°41′33″N 82°12′06″W	Fountain Inn	
14	Fairview Presbyterian Church	Fairview Presbyterian Church	August 16, 1977 (#77001224)	West of Fountain Inn off South Carolina Highway 418; 34°38′37″N 82°15′05″W	Fountain Inn	
15	Fountain Inn High School	Fountain Inn High School	June 3, 2009 (#09000390)	315 N. Main St. 34°41′44″N 82°12′06″W	Fountain Inn	
16	Fountain Inn Principal's House and Teacherage	Fountain Inn Principal's House and Teacherage	June 27, 2011 (#11000415)	105 Mt. Zion Dr. 34°41′47″N 82°11′33″W	Fountain Inn	
17	James A. Fulmer House	James A. Fulmer House	October 5, 2015 (#15000706)	303 N. Main St. 34°41′45″N 82°12′06″W	Fountain Inn	
18	Gilreath's Mill	Gilreath's Mill	May 28, 1976 (#76001703)	4 miles northwest of Greer on South Carolina Highway 101; 34°58′23″N 82°16′44″W	Greer	
19	John H. Goodwin House	John H. Goodwin House	September 8, 1983 (#83002197)	South Carolina Highway 11 at U.S. Route 25; 35°05′19″N 82°27′08″W	Travelers Rest	
20	Greenville Pepsi-Cola Bottling Plant	Greenville Pepsi-Cola Bottling Plant	September 21, 2023 (#100009398)	705 Poinsett Hwy. 34°52′33″N 82°24′16″W	Greenville vicinity	
21	Greer Depot	Greer Depot	March 6, 1987 (#87000409)	311 Trade St. 34°56′10″N 82°13′33″W	Greer	
22	Greer Downtown Historic District	Greer Downtown Historic District	September 18, 1997 (#97001156)	Roughly bounded by Trade, E. Poinsett, Randall, Victoria, and N. Main Sts.; Roughly along Trade St., E. Poinsett St., and N. Main St. 34°56′16″N 82°13′43″W	Greer	Second set of addresses represent boundary changes approved September 30, 2019.
23	Greer Mill	Greer Mill	June 6, 2022 (#100007764)	300 Connecticut Ave. 34°56′05″N 82°14′17″W	Greer	
24	Greer Post Office	Greer Post Office	January 31, 2011 (#10001184)	106 S Main St. 34°56′19″N 82°13′38″W	Greer	
25	Holly Springs School	Holly Springs School	October 7, 2019 (#100004494)	130 Holly Springs Rd. 34°34′41″N 82°23′48″W	Belton vicinity	
26	Hopkins Farm	Hopkins Farm	September 20, 2007 (#07000987)	3717 Fork Shoals Rd. 34°38′53″N 82°18′30″W	Simpsonville	
27	Louie James House	Louie James House	September 19, 1996 (#96000985)	401 W. Poinsett St. 34°56′25″N 82°14′05″W	Greer	
28	Judson Mill	Judson Mill	February 5, 2018 (#100002084)	701 Easley Bridge Rd. 34°50′13″N 82°25′39″W	Greenville	
29	McBee Methodist Church	McBee Methodist Church	March 23, 1972 (#72001212)	Main St. 34°46′00″N 82°21′10″W	Conestee	
30	McDowell House	McDowell House	November 17, 2010 (#10000921)	500 N Main St. 34°41′53″N 82°12′17″W	Fountain Inn	
31	Monaghan Mill	Monaghan Mill	October 4, 2005 (#05001159)	201 Smythe St. 34°52′00″N 82°25′27″W	City View	
32	Old Pilgrim Baptist Church Cemetery and Kilgore Family Cemetery	Old Pilgrim Baptist Church Cemetery and Kilgore Family Cemetery	February 28, 2017 (#100000688)	3540 Woodruff Rd. 34°47′36″N 82°11′46″W	Simpsonville	
33	Paris Mountain State Park Historic District	Paris Mountain State Park Historic District	April 30, 1998 (#98000416)	2401 State Park Rd. 34°56′25″N 82°23′39″W	Greenville	
34	Pelham Mills Site (38GR165)	Pelham Mills Site (38GR165)	November 19, 1987 (#87001954)	South of Greer on South Carolina Highway 14; 34°51′25″N 82°13′36″W	Pelham	
35	Piedmont Mill Stores Building	Piedmont Mill Stores Building	March 16, 2020 (#100005071)	2-8 Main St. 34°42′15″N 82°27′44″W	Piedmont	
36	Poinsett Bridge	Poinsett Bridge	October 22, 1970 (#70000590)	About 4 miles north of Tigerville on County Road 42; 35°07′47″N 82°23′06″W	Tigerville	
37	Robert Quillen Office and Library	Robert Quillen Office and Library	January 30, 2012 (#10000316)	200 N. Main St. 34°41′40″N 82°12′01″W	Fountain Inn	
38	Lawrence L. Richardson House	Lawrence L. Richardson House	September 26, 2022 (#100008218)	326 South Main St. 34°43′54″N 82°15′19″W	Simpsonville	
39	George Salmon House	George Salmon House	January 21, 1988 (#87002520)	South Carolina Highway 414, 1.8 miles west of U.S. Route 25; 35°02′07″N 82°27′31″W	Travelers Rest	
40	Simpsonville Baptist Church	Simpsonville Baptist Church	October 13, 1992 (#92001309)	106 Church St. 34°44′21″N 82°15′10″W	Simpsonville	
41	Southern Bleachery and Print Works	Southern Bleachery and Print Works	July 25, 2012 (#12000439)	113 Mill St. 34°55′12″N 82°17′21″W	Taylors	
42	Spring Park Inn	Spring Park Inn	February 1, 2018 (#100002085)	301 Old Buncombe Rd. 34°57′45″N 82°26′28″W	Travelers Rest	
43	Earle R. Taylor House and Peach Packing Shed	Earle R. Taylor House and Peach Packing Shed	June 27, 2012 (#12000372)	1001 Locust Hill Rd. 34°56′52″N 82°15′46″W	Greer	
44	Tullyton	Tullyton	July 31, 1990 (#89002151)	606 Hickory Tavern Rd. 34°36′24″N 82°13′57″W	Fountain Inn	
45	R. Perry Turner House	R. Perry Turner House	February 1, 1999 (#98001624)	211 N. Main St. 34°56′29″N 82°13′31″W	Greer	
46	Robert G. Turner House	Robert G. Turner House	February 1, 1999 (#98001625)	305 N. Main St. 34°56′34″N 82°13′30″W	Greer	
47	F. W. Welborn House	F. W. Welborn House	November 23, 2010 (#10000920)	405 N. Weston St. 34°41′51″N 82°12′09″W	Fountain Inn	
48	Woodside Cotton Mill Village Historic District	Woodside Cotton Mill Village Historic District	April 30, 1987 (#87000678)	Woodside Ave. and E. Main St. 34°51′12″N 82°25′47″W	Woodside	

== Former listing ==
	Name on the Register	Image	Date listed	Date removed	Location	City or town	Description
1	Piedmont Manufacturing Company	Piedmont Manufacturing Company	June 2, 1978 (#78002516)	March 5, 1986	Main Street; 34°51′12″N 82°25′47″W	Piedmont	Burned on October 26, 1983.

== See also ==
- List of National Historic Landmarks in South Carolina
- National Register of Historic Places listings in South Carolina
