= Conestee Nature Preserve =

Nature preserve in South Carolina, US

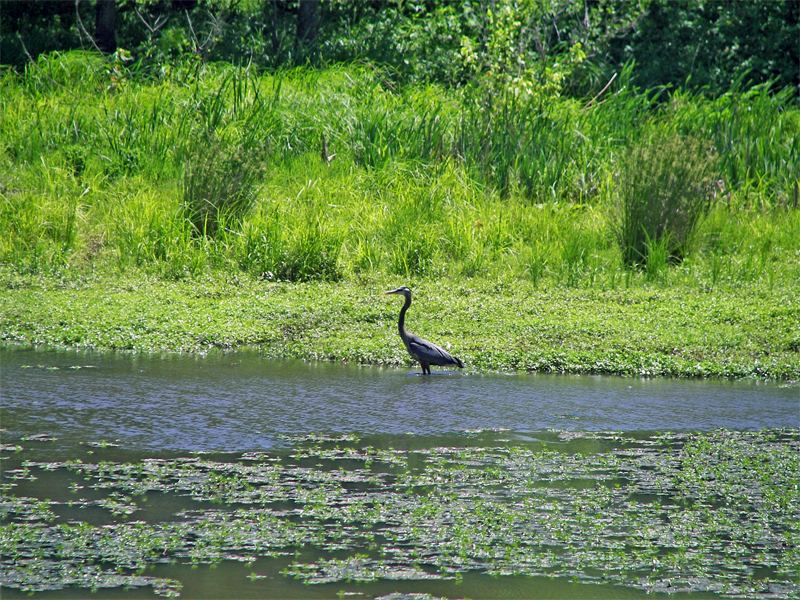
- Great Blue Heron in Conestee Nature Preserve

- Location within South Carolina
- Location: Greenville County, South Carolina
- Nearest city: Greenville, South Carolina
- Coordinates: 34°46′39″N 82°21′26″W
- Area: 400 acres (160 ha)
- Governing body: Conestee Foundation; Greenville County Recreation District
- Website: conesteepreserve.com

Conestee Nature Preserve, formerly Lake Conestee Nature Preserve/Park, opened in 2006, is a 400-acre (160 ha) preserve along three miles of the Reedy River in Conestee, South Carolina, with 13 miles (20.9 km) of trails, more than 6 miles (9.7 km) of them paved and 1 mile (1.6 km) of boardwalk. The Preserve contains both hardwood and evergreen forest, extensive wetlands, and a rich diversity of reptiles, mammals, and birds. At least 223 bird species have been reported, and the National Audubon Society has designated the park as an Important Bird Area of Global Significance. In 2016 the state of South Carolina made the privately owned facility a wildlife sanctuary.

Lake Conestee was created when the Reedy River was dammed at the Conestee Mill in about 1892. At its largest extent, the lake covered about 130 acres (53 ha), but years of upstream industrial waste and discharge filled about 90 percent of the lake with sediment so toxic that the lake was classified as a Superfund site. In 2000 the Conestee Foundation, a 501(c)(3) conservation organization, was formed to lead the revitalization of the lake as a wetlands through the development of the nature preserve, and the foundation used settlement funds from a June 1996 Colonial Pipeline spill to purchase the lake and the dam. Once safety studies of the brownfield were complete, it was determined that no harm would result if the toxic sediment were left in place.

In December 2016, inspectors from the state Department of Health and Environmental Control rated Conestee Dam, which is not keyed into the bedrock, in poor condition due to deterioration of mortar and water seepage.

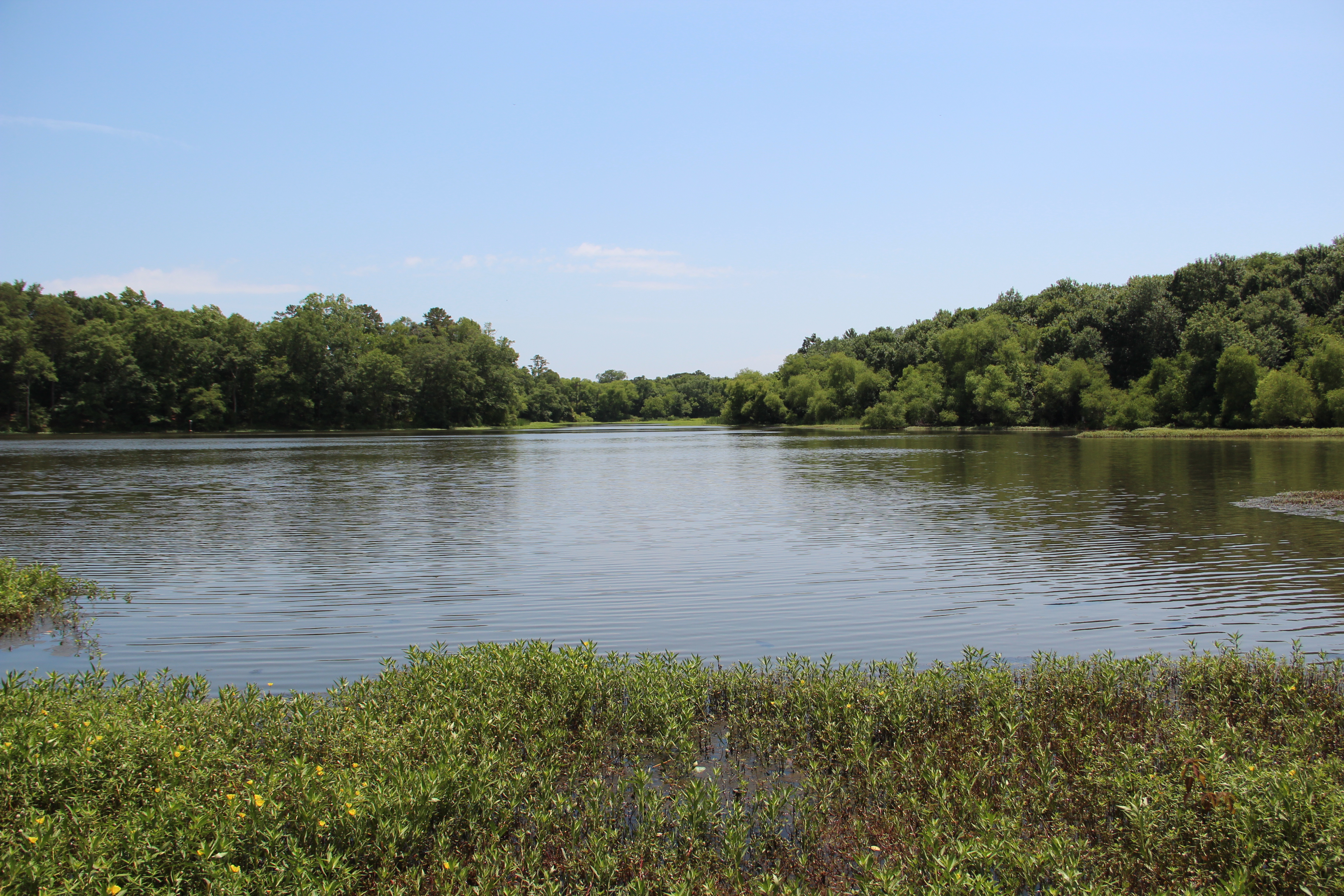
View of Lake Conestee

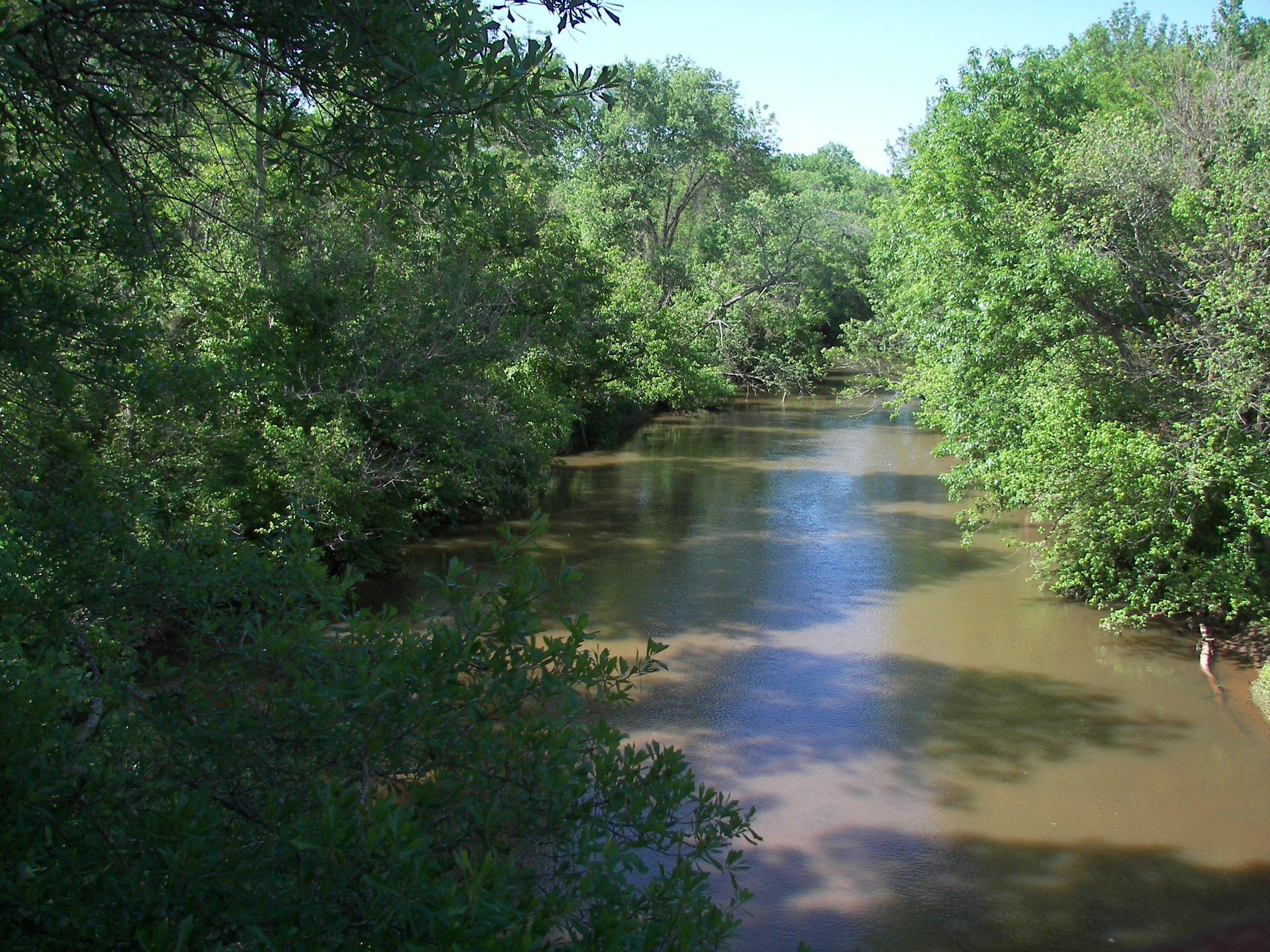
The Reedy River in Conestee Nature Preserve

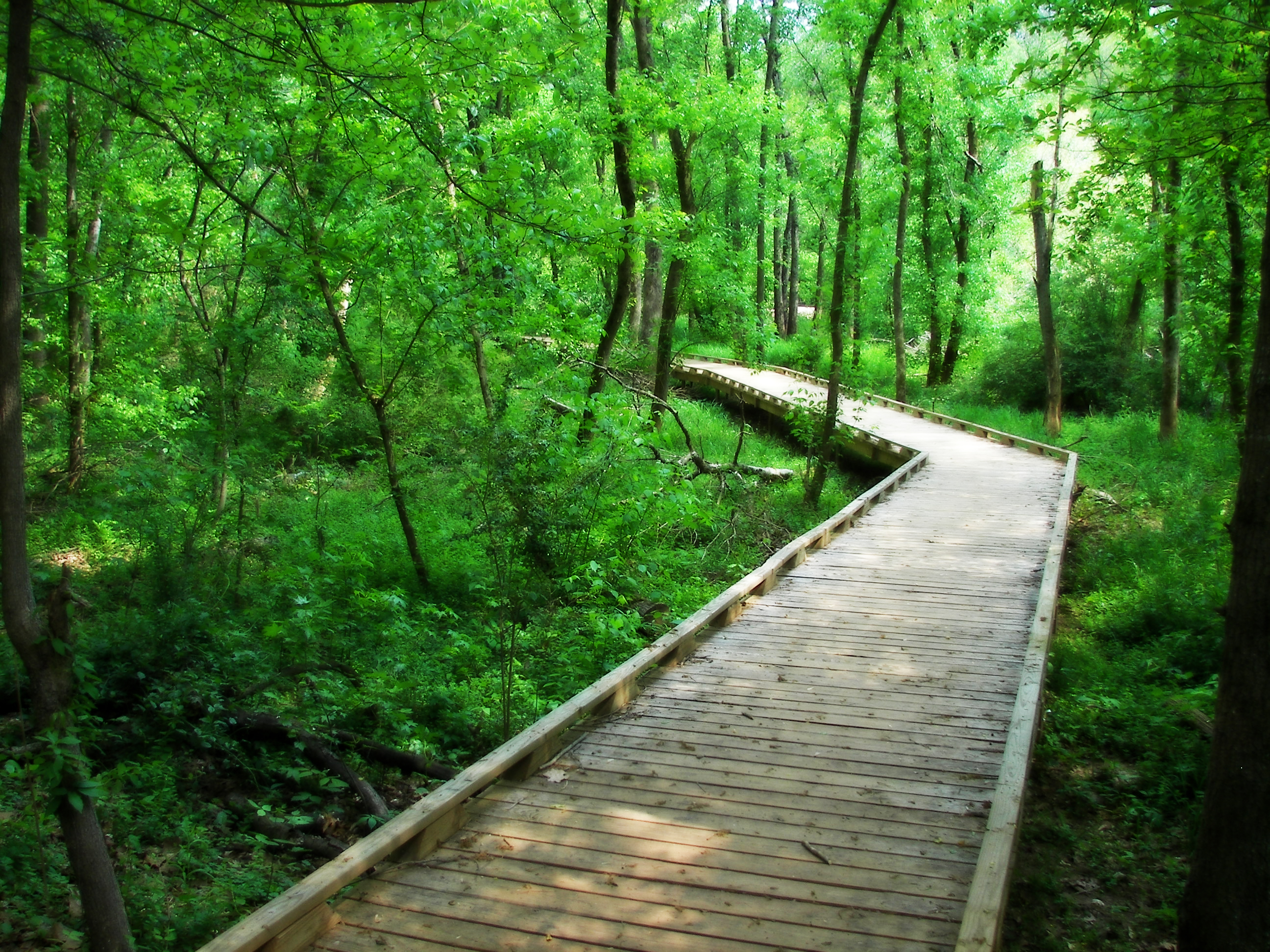
A boardwalk through Conestee Nature Preserve

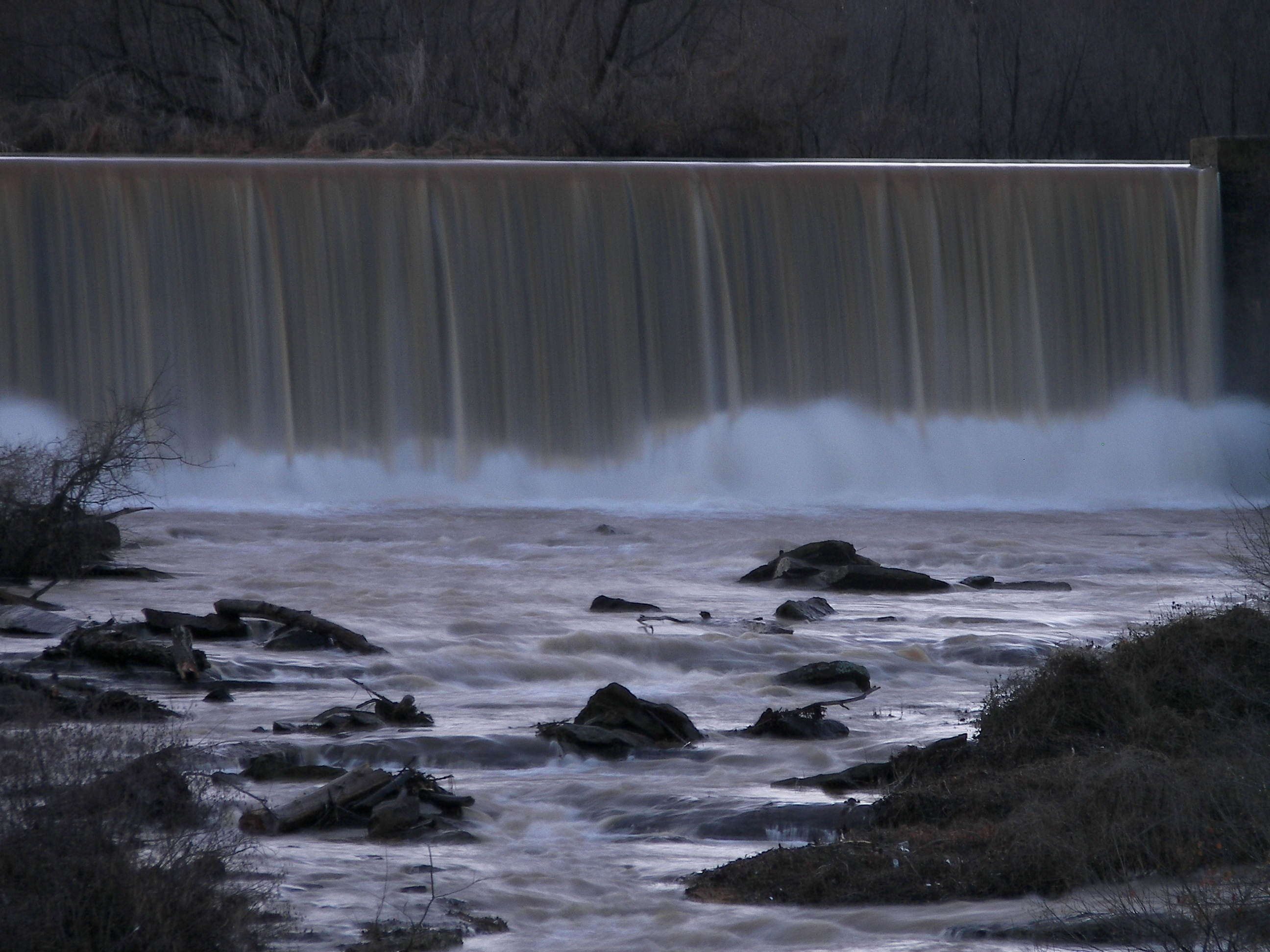
Lake Conestee is formed by the Conestee Dam on the Reedy River
