= American Spinning Company Mill No. 2 =

- U.S. National Register of Historic Places
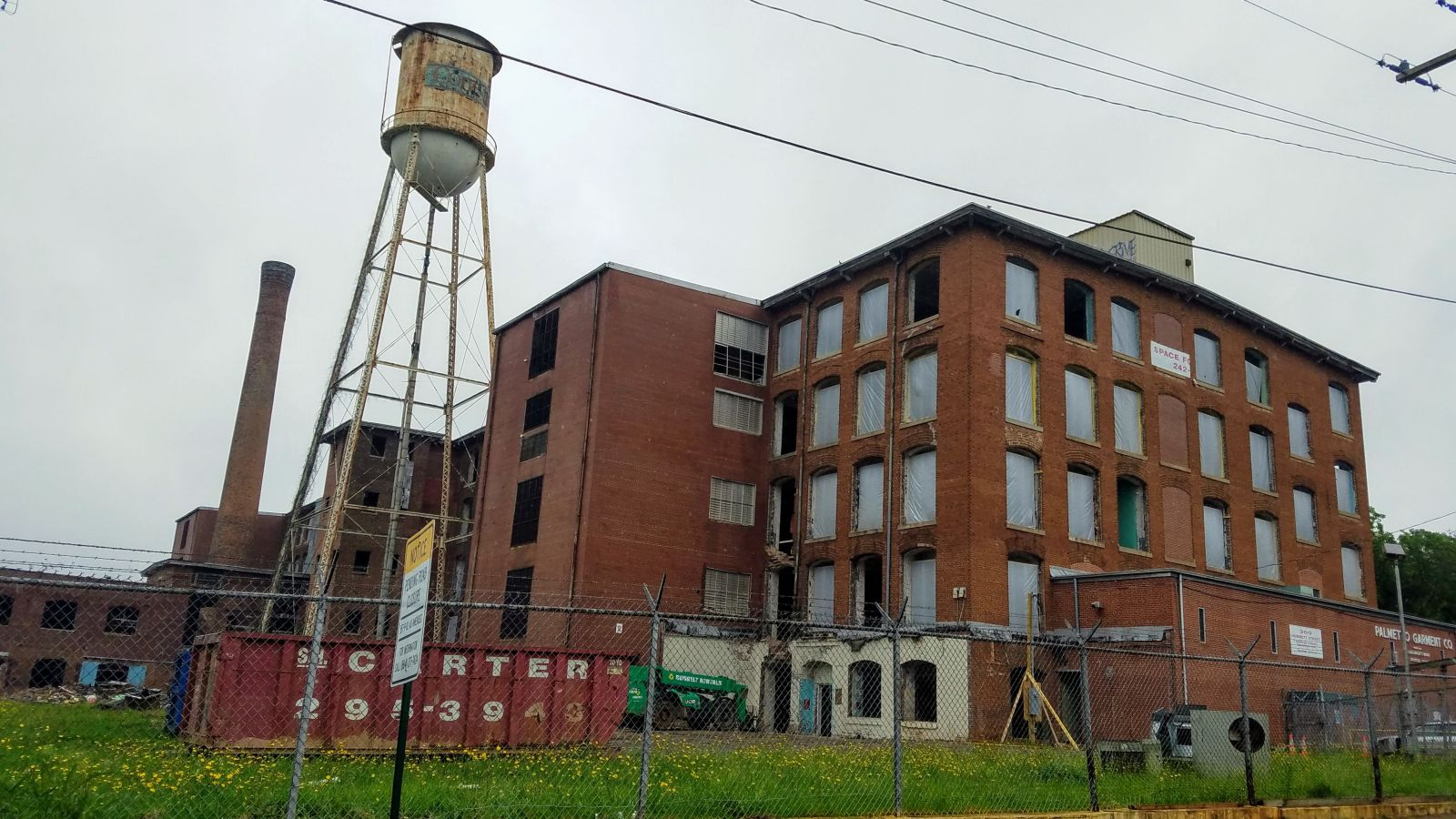

- Location within South Carolina Location within the United States
- Location: 300 Hammett St., just outside Greenville, South Carolina
- Coordinates: 34°52′24″N 82°24′44″W
- Area: 12.77 acres (5.17 ha)
- Built: 1902
- Architect: Lockwood & Greene
- NRHP reference No.: 16000730
- Added to NRHP: October 18, 2016

The American Spinning Company Mill No. 2 is a historic mill complex at 300 Hammett Street, in a pocket of unincorporated Greenville County, South Carolina surrounded on three sides by the city of Greenville. It is a five-story brick building, to which a number of warehouse buildings and other additions were made.

== History ==
It was built in 1901 and finished in 1902 by Oscar Sampson, a Boston textile manufacturer, following a design by the industrial design firm Lockwood and Greene. Originally built as a part of a major expansion to the American Spinning Company's Mill No. 1 (Also known at the time as Sampson Mill), is one of eighteen mills in Greenville. The mill was built just north of the Sampson Mill. In 1926, Florence Mills bought the mill. On June 27th, 1990, the mill closed making it one of the longest running textile mills in Greenville. It was listed on the National Register of Historic Places in 2016. Its major tenant now is the Victor Mill Company, a furniture maker.

== See also ==
- National Register of Historic Places listings in Greenville County, South Carolina
