= Cannon Building =

Cannon Building can refer to:

- Cannon Building (Troy, New York), listed on the National Register of Historic Places (NRHP) in Rensselaer County, New York
- Cannon Building (Fountain Inn, South Carolina), listed on the NRHP in South Carolina
- Cannon House Office Building of the United States House of Representatives.
