= James A. Fulmer House =

Historic house in Fountain Inn, South Carolina

- U.S. National Register of Historic Places
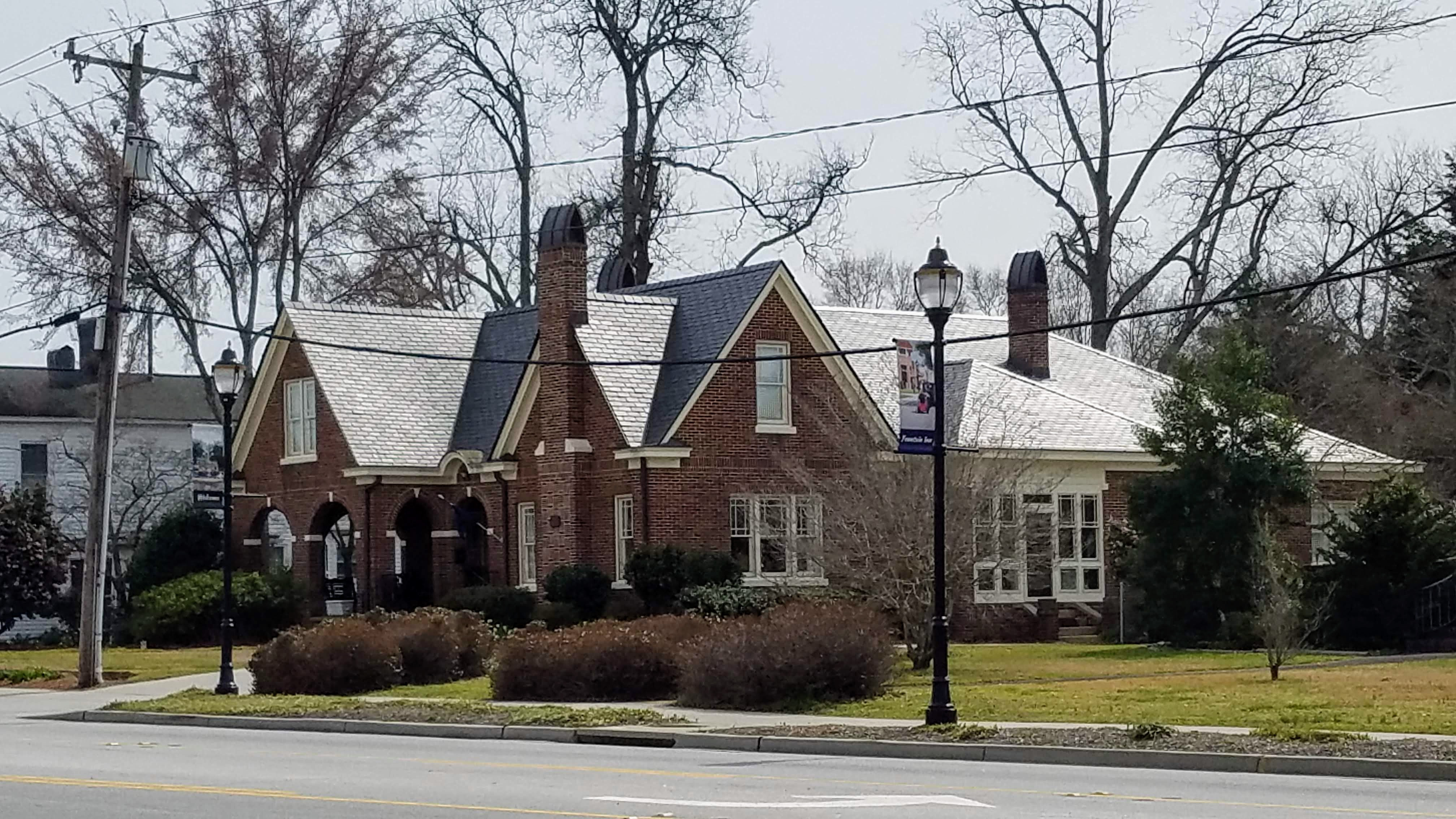

- Location within South Carolina Location within the United States
- Location: 303 N. Main St., Fountain Inn, South Carolina
- Coordinates: 34°41′45″N 82°12′06″W
- Area: less than one acre
- Built: 1932
- Architect: Leila Ross Wilburn
- Architectural style: Tudor Revival
- NRHP reference No.: 15000706
- Added to NRHP: October 5, 2015

The James A. Fulmer House is a historic house at 303 North Main Street in Fountain Inn, South Carolina. It is a 1 1/2 story brick building, with a side gable roof and projecting gable section on the left front. It is basically Tudor Revival in character, but also exhibits Craftsman details such as extended eaves and exposed rafter ends. Built in 1932 for a prominent businessman, it is one of the city's finest examples of Tudor Revival architecture, and a rare example of design work by Leila Ross Wilburn, one of the first female pattern-book architects.

The house was listed on the National Register of Historic Places in 2015.

== See also ==
- National Register of Historic Places listings in Greenville County, South Carolina
