= Teacherage =

Teacher's Residence

A teacherage is a house for one or more schoolteachers, like a parsonage is a house for a parson or minister of a Protestant church. Teacherages are used to provide accommodation for teachers in remote native communities in Canada since teachers are often not long-term residents of the community and therefore do not have their own housing.

Notable examples include:

- Markham School and Teacherage, Oilton, Oklahoma, listed on the National Register of Historic Places (NRHP)
- San Juan Teacherage, in Grant County, New Mexico, NRHP-listed
- Fuquay Springs Teacherage, Fuquay-Varina, North Carolina, NRHP-listed
- Fountain Inn Principal's House and Teacherage, Fountain Inn, South Carolina, NRHP-listed
- Great Branch Teacherage, Orangeburg, South Carolina, NRHP-listed
- Garland Community School Teacherage, Dekalb, Texas, NRHP-listed

== In popular culture ==
The orphanage is closed down and sold to become a teacherage at the end of the novel, The BFG.
