= Brushy Creek (Greenville, South Carolina) =

Historic house in South Carolina, United States

- U.S. National Register of Historic Places
- Location within South Carolina Location within the United States
- Location: 327 Rice St., Greenville, South Carolina
- Coordinates: 34°48′35″N 82°23′30″W
- Area: 19.4 acres (7.9 ha)
- Built: c. 1836
- Architectural style: Upcountry farmhouse
- NRHP reference No.: 99000102
- Added to NRHP: October 6, 1999

Brushy Creek, also known as Vardry McBee House and Alexander McBee House, is a historic home located at Greenville, South Carolina. It was built about 1836 as a 1 1/2-story, frame farmhouse. In 1924, the house was expanded with the addition of a one-story frame room that incorporated the formerly separate kitchen into the house itself. Further renovations were made in 1938–1939 and 1951. Also on the property are a log barn, a brick shed, a well house, and the ruins of a grist mill. It was the home of Vardry McBee (1775–1864), prominent 19th-century businessman, entrepreneur, and delegate to the Secession Convention of Greenville District, known as the “Father of Greenville,” and his son Alexander McBee (1822–1897), prominent 19th-century businessman, banker, and state representative of Greenville District.

It was added to the National Register of Historic Places in 1999.
