= Conestee Mill =

- U.S. National Register of Historic Places
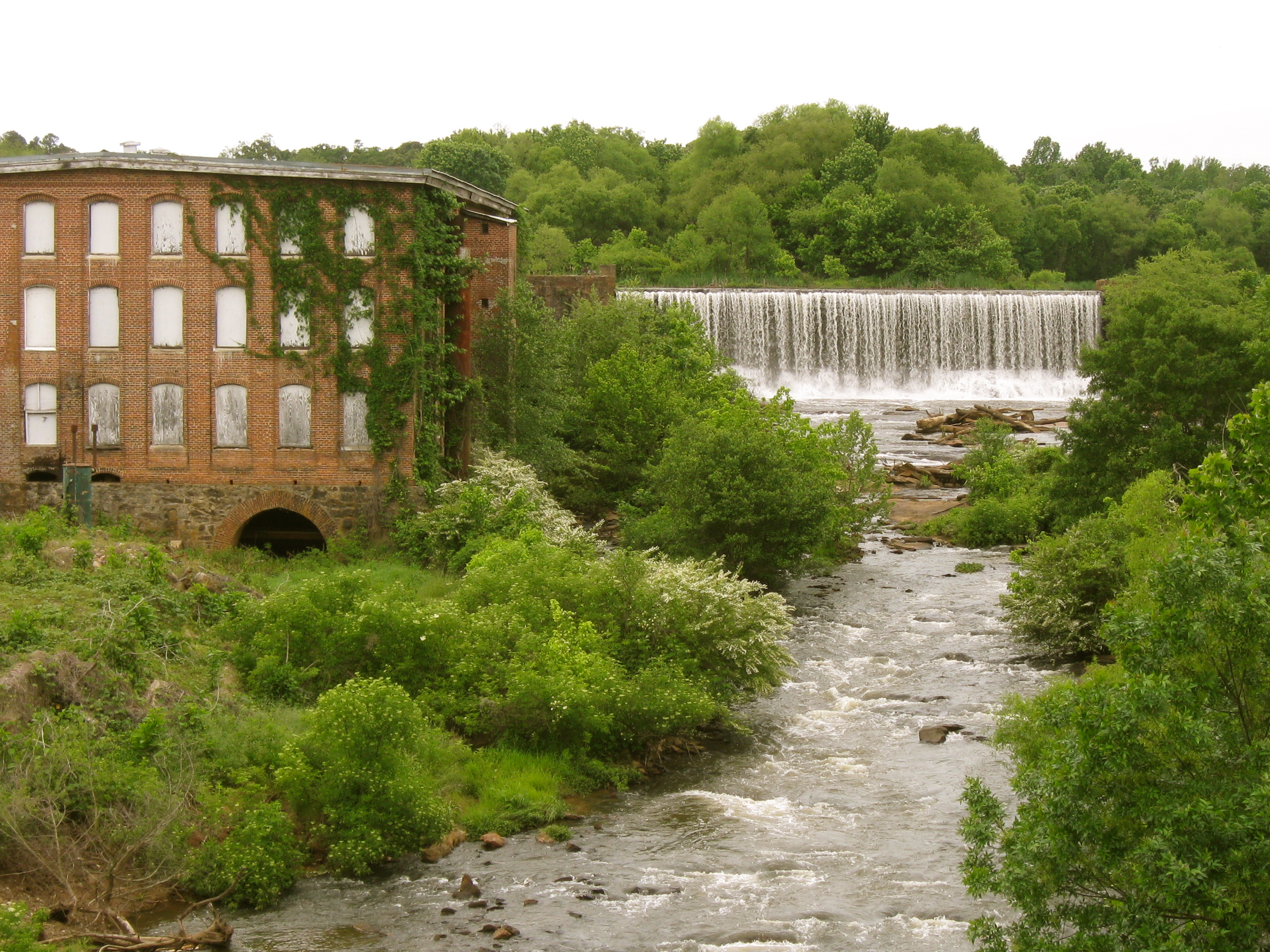
- Conestee Mill, 2014

- Location within South Carolina Location within the United States
- Interactive map of Conestee Mill
- Location: 1 Spanco Dr., Conestee, Greenville County, South Carolina, United States
- Coordinates: 34°46′13″N 82°20′51″W
- Area: 140 acres (57 ha)
- NRHP reference No.: 09000913
- Added to NRHP: March 2, 2014

Conestee Mill is a historic mill in the unincorporated community of Conestee, in Greenville County, South Carolina.

== History ==
Archaeological investigations indicate that Cherokee routinely used the area as a camp site during the colonial period. In 1794, a 200-acre parcel (81 ha) on both sides of the Reedy River, including the land occupied by the Conestee Mill and dam, was deeded to Andrew Nelson. Grist mills and saw mills operated on the site as early as the 1790s. In 1800, Adam Carruth and Lemuel Alston purchased nearby land where Carruth manufactured muskets for the states of South Carolina and Georgia and briefly for the U.S. government; but the factory went bankrupt before 1824.

In 1799, Andrew Nelson sold the downstream 100 acres (40 ha) of his 200-acre parcel (81 ha) that included a mill seat and yard on the south side of the river. By 1820, a small community had grown up around the mills. Before 1833, the existing mill buildings and machinery, were sold to Vardry McBee, the "Father of Greenville." As McBee Factory, its mills produced both paper and woolen and cotton textiles. There were about fifty employees of the cotton factory, paper mill, gristmill, and sawmill, supporting a community of about 150 people. After 1875, the mill was known as the Reedy River Factory until being rechartered as Conestee Mills in 1909. In the 1890s the existing mill building was constructed; and about 1892, the rock dam was raised to its present height, creating a lake of 130 acres (53 ha).

In the twentieth century the City of Greenville and twelve mills and mill villages upstream from Conestee discharged their sewage and industrial wastes into the Reedy River and therefore into Conestee Lake. The pollutants produced foul odors and so depleted the oxygen content of the lake that it became unfit for any use other than generating power.

In 1925, Conestee Mills sued the City of Greenville for damages, and although the mill eventually failed because of the protracted litigation and the Great Depression, a South Carolina Supreme Court decision of 1931 "was an early landmark in the fight to clean South Carolina's rivers." The mill closed in 1939, reopened under new ownership in 1946, then closed for a final time in 1971. The buildings were thereafter used as a distribution center and for storage. In 2017 the buildings were being used as a rug warehouse.

Years of upstream industrial waste and discharge filled about 90 percent of the lake with sediment so toxic that the lake was classified as a Superfund site. In 2000 the Conestee Foundation, a 501(c)(3) conservation organization, was formed to lead the revitalization of the lake as a wetlands through the development of the nature park; and the foundation used settlement funds from a June 1996 Colonial Pipeline spill to purchase the lake and the dam. Once safety studies of the brownfield were complete, it was determined that no harm would result if the toxic sediment and dam were left in place. The toxic wastes include heavy metals (such as lead), pesticides, and cancer-causing chemical compounds such as PCBs and PAHs. though in December 2016, inspectors from the state Department of Health and Environmental Control determined Conestee Dam, which is not keyed into the bedrock, to be in poor condition due to deterioration of mortar and water seepage.

On March 2, 2014, the mill, as well as its dam and the residual lake, were included on the National Register of Historic Places, and the property is currently a nature park and wildlife sanctuary.
