= Textile industry in Greenville, South Carolina =

South Carolina economic segment (1870s–1970s)

The textile industry was a formerly significant portion of the economy in Greenville, South Carolina, with the production of textiles, primarily cotton, at a high level. It began with Camperdown Mill's founding in the mid 1870s and fell with the rest of South Carolina's textile industry in the 1970s. The base of this industry was the 20 textile mills that were in the city. Most of these mills were designed by Joseph E. Sirrine., who was working with Lockwood, Greene Co., a Bostonian engineering firm.

== Mill villages ==
Almost every one of the mills in Greenville were built with mill villages during their construction. These mill villages were settlements for the mill workers and families to live in during their employment. These town often included churches and schools. The mill owners often had general stores in the village which accepted a type of credit that was given out as a part of their salary. These general stores had necessities such as, meat and salt. In addition, mill villages in Greenville often had baseball textile leagues for workers and their families, formed to help keep morale high.

During the 1920s, the mills started having "stretch-outs" to combat the declining economy. The change basically amounted to getting more work from fewer workers. This workforce stress accompanied mill village deterioration, which led to protests, such as the textile workers strike of 1934. The cutbacks and the rise of motorcars led to the mill village properties being sold.

== Poe Mill ==
It was established by Francis Winslow Poe in 1896 and a year later started operations with 10,000 spindles, 300 looms, and 400 workers. The mill and surrounding village was designed by Joseph E. Serrine and built by local contractor Jacob O. Cagle. Through 1933 and 1934 multiple protests were held at the mill which resulted in a 15% pay increase. During WWII, the mill was used to make duck cloth. In 1947, Ely & Walker Co. bought the mill and sold the village in 1950. In 1954, Burlington Industries bought the mill and closed it in 1977. In 2002 and 2003, fires burned down the mill, leaving the smokestacks behind. Since then, a DIY skatepark has taken the area.

== Brandon Mill ==
Planned in 1899, this mill was named after a hamlet near Belfast. In 1900, a boy who later came to be known as Shoeless Joe Jackson played in the mill baseball league for Brandon Mill, and that led to him becoming a major league baseball player, and having the fourth highest batting average in league history. From 1901 to 1906, the mill went from 16,000 to 86,000 spindles and from 150 to 420 employees. After some financial difficulties in 1913, the mill went into receivership. During World War II, the mill kept profit by making duck cloth, medical gauze, and uniform twill fabric. In 1946, Abney Mills bought the mill and started selling the mill houses. The mill was closed in 1977 and in 2001, Focus Golf bought it as a distribution center for Dunlop Sport. In 2014, Pace Burt bought the property and started developing it for lofts, which opened for occupancy in 2016. In September 2014, the property achieved a National Register Status.

== American Spinning Mill ==
The American Spinning Mill (or American Spinning Mill No. 2) was built in 1901 as part of an expansion to the first mill (American Spinning Mill No. 1). It was built by Oscar Sampson, a Boston manufacturer. The property was admitted into the National Registry of Historic Places in 2016.

== Camperdown Mill ==
The Camperdown Mill was an addition to the Vardry Mill (then known as the Camperdown Mill No. 1), which was founded two years earlier. Vardry Mill's success led to the founding of the Camperdown Mill (also called McBee Mill at the time) in 1876, which later became known as the main mill of the two. After several changes in ownership, in 1880, the Camperdown Mill became the second most profitable textile mill in South Carolina. Misfortune followed, including three depressions, the mill's closure twice, and a lack of Japanese gingham imports. The mill was demolished in 1959.

== Vardry Mill ==
The Vardry Mill building was formerly a trade post and grain mill from 1768 until O. H. Sampson and George Hall leased it in 1874 from Vardry McBee. It was the first mill in Greenville, and its popularity led to the founding of the Camperdown Mill No. 2 and the mill's own name being changed to Camperdown Mill No. 1. Most of its 4,000 spindles were used for making cotton yarn and thread. In the financial panic of 1893, the mill was closed and reverted back to McBee's heirs. In 1906, Luther Vardry bought both Camperdown Mills and renamed Camperdown Mill No. 1 back to Vardry Mill. It was closed in 1919 and used for storage. Furman University purchased the mill in the late 1930s and it burned in 1943.

== Piedmont Plush Mill ==
The mill was founded by Fred W. Symmes and Clifton Corley in 1925 as the first mill in South Carolina to produce plush. By 1939, it had 28 looms that produced plush, mohair, velour, and auto upholstery. The mill was closed in 1983.

== Mills Mill ==
Construction of the Mills Mill began in 1895 and it started operation in 1897. The three-story building was founded by Otis P. Mills and held 5,000 spindles at the time of its founding. In 1903, the mill expanded to 27,000 spindles and 740 looms, which it used to make cotton sheeting, twill, and satin. Reeves Brothers, Inc. bought the mill in 1918 and closed it in 1978. In 2004, the mill was developed into loft-style condominiums.

== Carolina/Poinsett Mill ==
The mill was established in 1893 as Gates Desk Company. In 1900, the mill rechartered itself as Carolina Cotton Mills and also renovated to become a yarn mill. In 1916, the mill was renamed to Poinsett Mill, after Joel R. Poinsett, who advocated for southern industry. Soon after that change, Augustus W. Smith became the company president. In 1928, Poinsett Mills and 3 other mills combined to form the Brandon Corporation. Abney Mills gained control of the mill in 1949 and closed it in 1981. The Reynolds, Co. bought the mill in 1983.

== Judson/Westervelt Mill ==
John Irving Westervelt bought 300 acres of land along Easley Bridge Road in 1911 to begin this mill. He resigned from leadership in 1913 and new president Bennette Geer named it Judson Mill to honor fellow Furman University professor Charles Judson. The mill grew, along with an adjacent village that supported its workers. In 1923, the mill had nearly 53,000 spindles and was producing 11 million sq yd (9.2 million m^{2}) of cloth per year. In 1927, Geer sold most of the company stock to Deering-Milliken. Geer returned to Furman in 1933 and in 1939, Milliken began selling its village homes to residents as it removed company support for the community. The mill grew to 1 million sq ft (93 thousand m^{2}) and became a division of Milliken in 1960. Judson Mill closed operations in 2015 and was added to the National Register in February 2018. In 2019, investors began renovating the mill and converting its spaces into loft-style apartments, restaurants, and other retail establishments, while also hosting community events.

== Monaghan Mill ==
The mill was founded in February 1900 by cousins Lewis Wardlaw Parker and Thomas Fleming Parker, and named after Monaghan County in Ireland. Lockwood, Greene & Co. built the mill on 325 acres of land in West Greenville. After opening in 1902, the mill quickly gained success with its production of print cloths, fancy dress goods, shirtlings, and shade cloth. In 1914, owner Parker Cotton Mills Company collapsed, which led Monaghan and other Parker mills to reorganize into the Victor-Monaghan Group, bought by J. P. Stevens and Company in 1946. When the depression came, like many other mills at the time, Monaghan introduced "stretch-outs" to save money, but still functioned normally during the textile workers' strike of 1934 when union organizers found guards defending the mill and its doors locked. During WWII, the mill produced cloth for uniforms. In 1988, JPS Converter and Industrial Group bought the mill, until it closed in 2001. Capitol Development Corporation tried to re-zone the mill for an apartment complex in 2003, but was denied the opportunity. Monaghan Mills LLC later accomplished re-zoning and in October 2006, "The Lofts of Greenville" opened. In 2005, Monaghan Mill was added to the National Register of Historic Places.
