= Old Pilgrim Baptist Church Cemetery and Kilgore Family Cemetery =

Historic cemeteries in South Carolina, US

- U.S. National Register of Historic Places
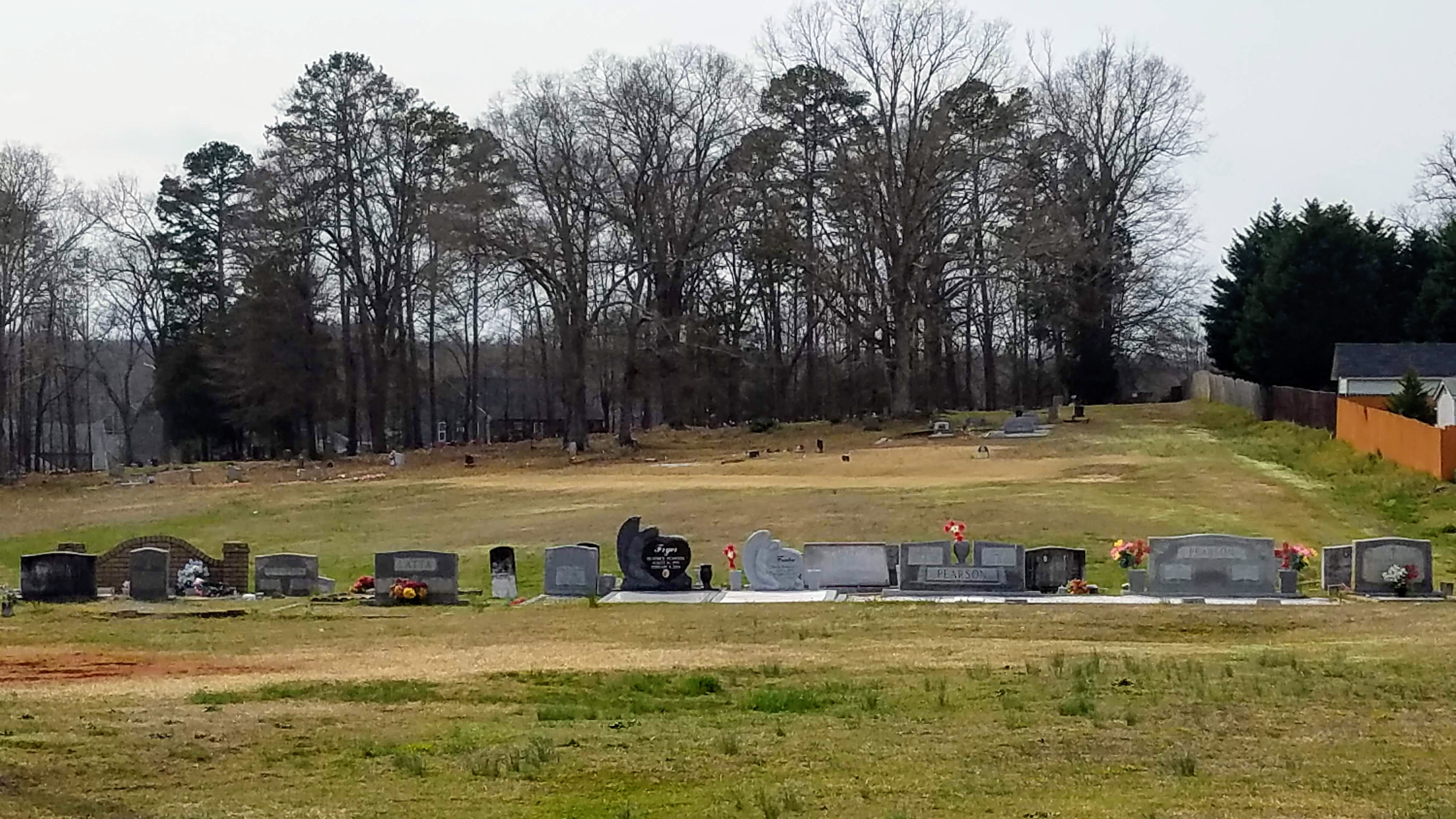

- Location within South Carolina Location within the United States
- Location: 3540 Woodruff Rd., near Simpsonville, South Carolina
- Coordinates: 34°47′36″N 82°11′46″W
- NRHP reference No.: 100000688
- Added to NRHP: February 28, 2017

The Old Pilgrim Baptist Church Cemetery and Kilgore Family Cemetery are a pair of historic cemeteries at 3540 Woodruff Road, southeast of Five Forks, South Carolina. The Kilgore Cemetery houses the remains of several generations of 19th-century plantation owners in the Kilgore family, while the Old Pilgrim Baptist Church Cemetery is an African-American burial ground established in 1868 by former slaves of the Kilgore plantation. The Kilgore Cemetery's funerary markers include several examples cut by W.T. White, a regionally prominent stone cutter.

The cemeteries were added to the National Register of Historic Places in 2017.

== See also ==
- National Register of Historic Places listings in Greenville County, South Carolina
