= Robert Quillen =

American journalist and humorist (1887–1948)

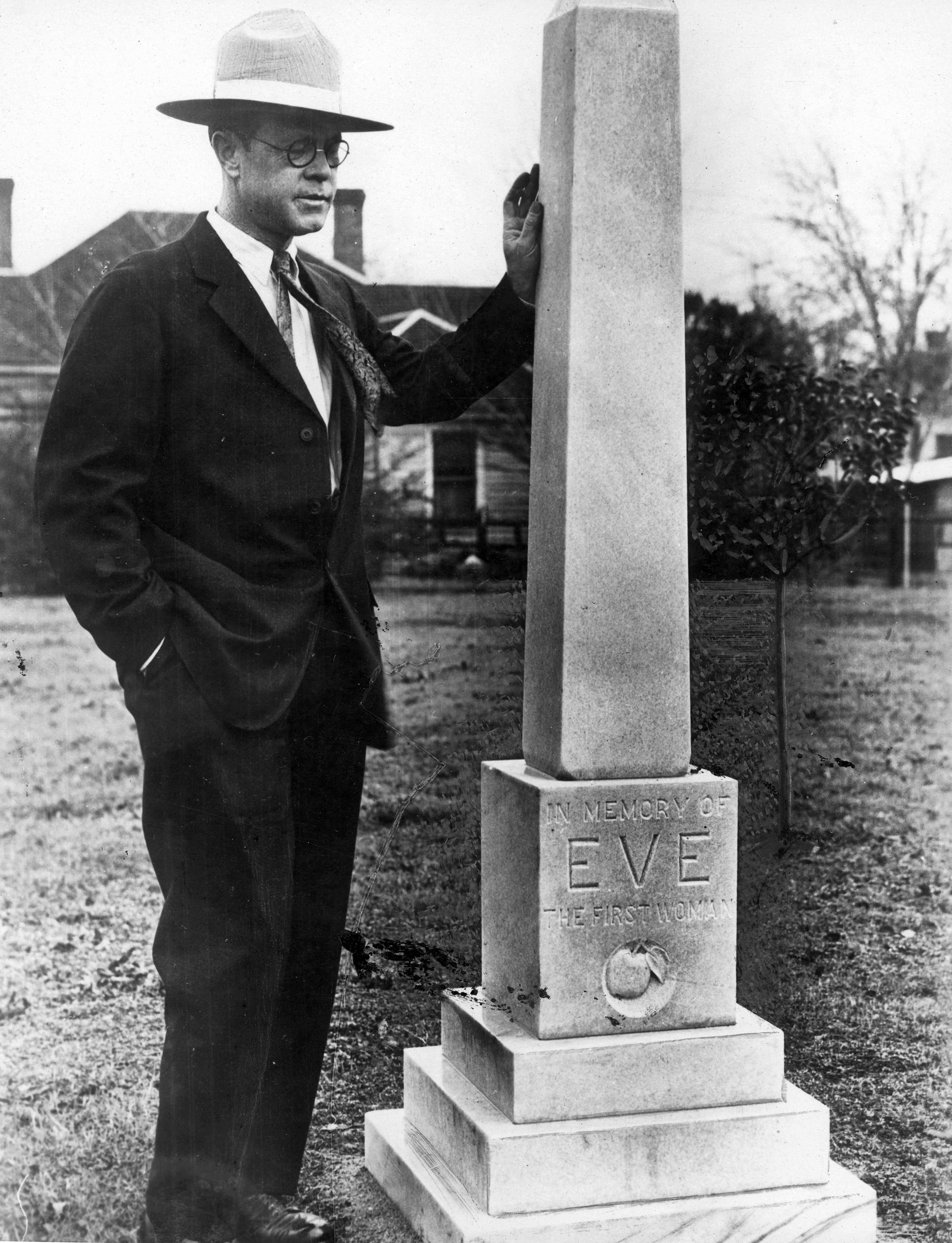
- Born: Verni Robert Quillen; March 25, 1887; Syracuse, Kansas, U.S.
- Died: December 9, 1948 (aged 61); Asheville, North Carolina
- Resting place: Fountain Inn, South Carolina
- Occupations: Journalist, Humorist
- Spouses: Donnie Cox (m. 1906; died 1921) Marcelle Babb (m. 1922)
- Writing career
- Notable work: Fountain Inn Tribune
- Movement: "village nostalgia"

Verni Robert Quillen (March 25, 1887 – December 9, 1948) was an American journalist and humorist who for more than a quarter century was "one of the leading purveyors of village nostalgia" from his home in Fountain Inn, South Carolina. In 2012, his office and library was listed on the National Register of Historic Places.

== Youth and early career ==
Quillen was born in Syracuse, Kansas, near the Colorado border, and was reared in Overbrook, Kansas, a hamlet south of Topeka, where his father, J. D. Quillen, published the local newspaper. Robert early learned to set type and as a teenager sold pen-and-ink drawings and published a monthly magazine. In 1904, shortly before his seventeenth birthday, Quillen joined the U.S. Army under an assumed name (swearing he was 21), but by mid-1905, he had been released from military service. He then spent a few months working for newspapers in the northeastern United States where he had been discharged.

In 1906, he answered an ad seeking an editor for a weekly that a publisher hoped to establish in Fountain Inn, South Carolina. Although after his first encounter he remained in Fountain Inn only three months, Quillen there met and married Donnie Cox, a milliner, five years his senior. He moved on to Americus, Georgia, and then took his new bride to Washington state, where Quillen joined forces with his father and worked at publishing newspapers and magazines in Winlock, Anacortes, and Port Orchard. Quillen later wrote that he had gone "busted" in the West.

== Fountain Inn Tribune ==
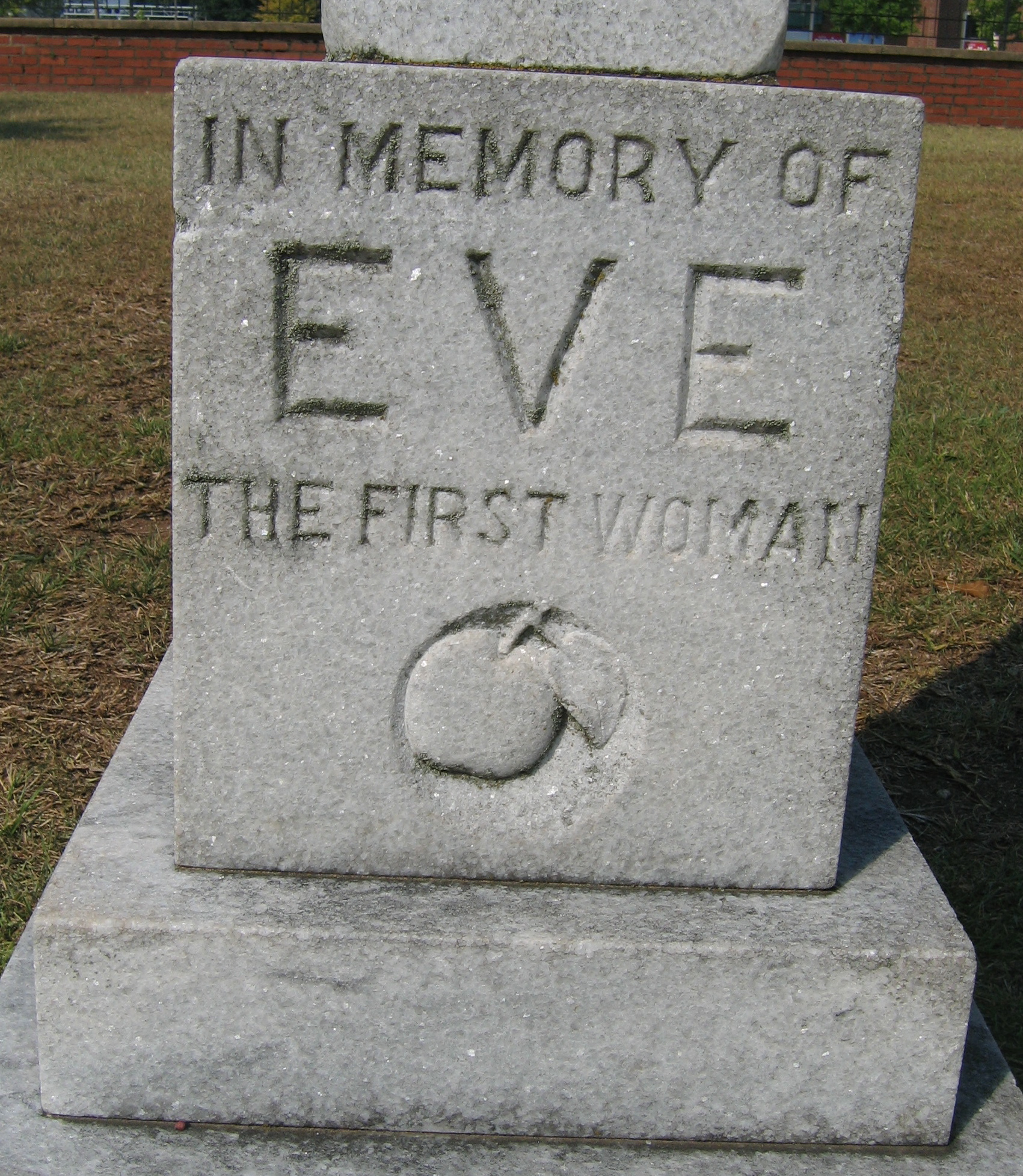
Quillen's Monument to Eve, 1925

In 1910, when his brother-in-law in Fountain Inn offered to sell him a weekly advertising sheet called News and Notions, Quillen bought it and borrowed money to purchase his own press and type. In the following year Quillen began editing and publishing the newly christened Fountain Inn Tribune, "a well-organized publication overflowing with news of Fountain Inn and outlying communities."

At first, as Quillen confessed two decades later, "the natives were a little hot under the collar" at what he called his "hypothetical cases"—thinly veiled descriptions of the locals—but most soon warmed to him like an eccentric aunt. One Fountain Inn man warned a new preacher, "Don't get mad at anything Mr. Quillen says. We're used to him and just overlook his queerness." Among other oddities, Quillen regularly wore a "cowboy-type Stetson," raised a memorial to "Eve, the First Woman," published his father's obituary before he died, used a column to advertise his interest in adopting a baby boy ("must be between three and twelve months of age"), and built himself a faux Greek temple as a work space—which he never used.

Facile with words, Quillen took inconsistent political, economic, and racial positions; but he was "not afraid to bare his soul, express personal views, and even vent scorn and anger." For instance, he hated patent medicine, people who put on airs, late night noises (both human and natural), and the cats and jays that killed his beloved song birds. Although a shy man who refused to speak in public, he became something of a "one-man welfare and relief agency for the poor and needy of Fountain Inn."

Meanwhile, Quillen engaged in a "never ending struggle" to make the Fountain Inn Tribune pay its own way. With fewer than a thousand subscribers, the newspaper itself was probably never profitable, but Quillen used the ideas generated in Fountain Inn as the basis for pieces that appeared in scores of leading national magazines and newspapers. Twice, frustrated with the time it took to run the weekly, he sold the paper (notoriously in 1926 for one dollar) and twice bought it back. In 1929, Quillen called the Tribune "my hobby—my substitute for golf."

== Syndicated journalist ==
By 1932 his work, which included editorials, paragraphs, cartoons, and one-liners, was regularly appearing in four hundred newspapers in the United States, Canada, England, and the Far East. Quillen wrote for such major periodicals such as the Baltimore Sun, the Saturday Evening Post, and The American Magazine, and he "took the greatest pride" in one-liners picked up by Literary Digest. According to a biographer, he was known as the best "paragrapher" of his day. With the assistance of Chicago newspaper executive Eugene P. Conley (co-founder of the Publishers Syndicate), Quillen also syndicated two single-panel cartoons (drawn by John H. Striebel), Aunt Het and Willie Willis — the latter of which was translated into Dutch as Pimmie Pimmel. As early as 1924, Quillen's income from syndicated material alone was probably more than $25,000 — easily ten times that amount in early 21st-century dollars.

Well into his forties, Quillen hoped to become a great novelist. Macmillan published his two novels, One Man's Religion (1923) and The Path Wharton Found (1924). The first was "little more than a loose collection of pieces first published in the Saturday Evening Post," the second, a book which one reviewer called a "good enough conventional story, hampered by neither originality nor brilliancy." A decade later Quillen referred to these books as "fortunately out of print."

In 1934 Hollywood screen writer Lamar Trotti and producer George Marshall visited Quillen to use him as a prototype for a Will Rogers film, Life Begins at 40, in which Rogers played a small-town newspaper editor. The film credits mentioned Quillen for "contributing dialogue."

== Personal life ==
Unable to find the adoptive son for whom he had advertised, Quillen and his wife adopted a baby girl, Louise, to whom Quillen later wrote a noted series of public epistles, "Letters from a Bald-Headed Dad to His Red-Headed Daughter." Shortly after the adoption, his wife died following routine surgery. In 1922, Quillen married another woman from Fountain Inn, Marcelle Babb.

Despite years of ill health, Quillen continued to smoke and avoid doctors. He died at a nursing home in Asheville, North Carolina in 1948 and was buried in Fountain Inn. Not surprisingly, he had written and published his own obituary sixteen years earlier, which read in part, "He was a writer of paragraphs and short editorials. He always hoped to write something of permanent value, but the business of making a living took most of his time and he never got around to it. In his youth he felt an urge to reform the world, but during the latter years of his life he decided that he would be doing rather well if he kept himself out of jail."
