= Fuquay Springs Teacherage =

- U.S. National Register of Historic Places
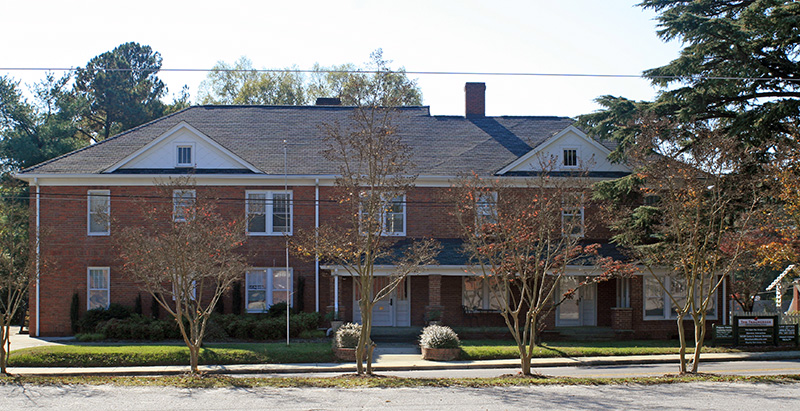
- Fuquay Springs Teacherage, November 2009

- Location within North Carolina Location within the United States
- Location: 602 E Academy St., Fuquay-Varina, North Carolina
- Coordinates: 35°35′2″N 78°47′35″W
- Area: 0.7 acres (0.28 ha)
- Built: c. 1925, 1947
- Built by: Hairr, A.Y.
- Architectural style: Bungalow/craftsman
- NRHP reference No.: 05001448
- Added to NRHP: December 23, 2005

Fuquay Springs Teacherage is a historic teacherage located at Fuquay-Varina, Wake County, North Carolina. It was built about 1925, as a Bungalow/American Craftsman-style residence. It was more than doubled in size in 1947, when the Wake County Board of Education purchased the property for use as a teacherage. It is a two-story, red-brick building with a low hipped roof and wide eaves. It features a full-width, hip roofed front porch on the original section.

It was listed on the National Register of Historic Places in 2002.
