= Fountain Inn Principal's House and Teacherage =

Historic house in South Carolina, United States

- U.S. National Register of Historic Places
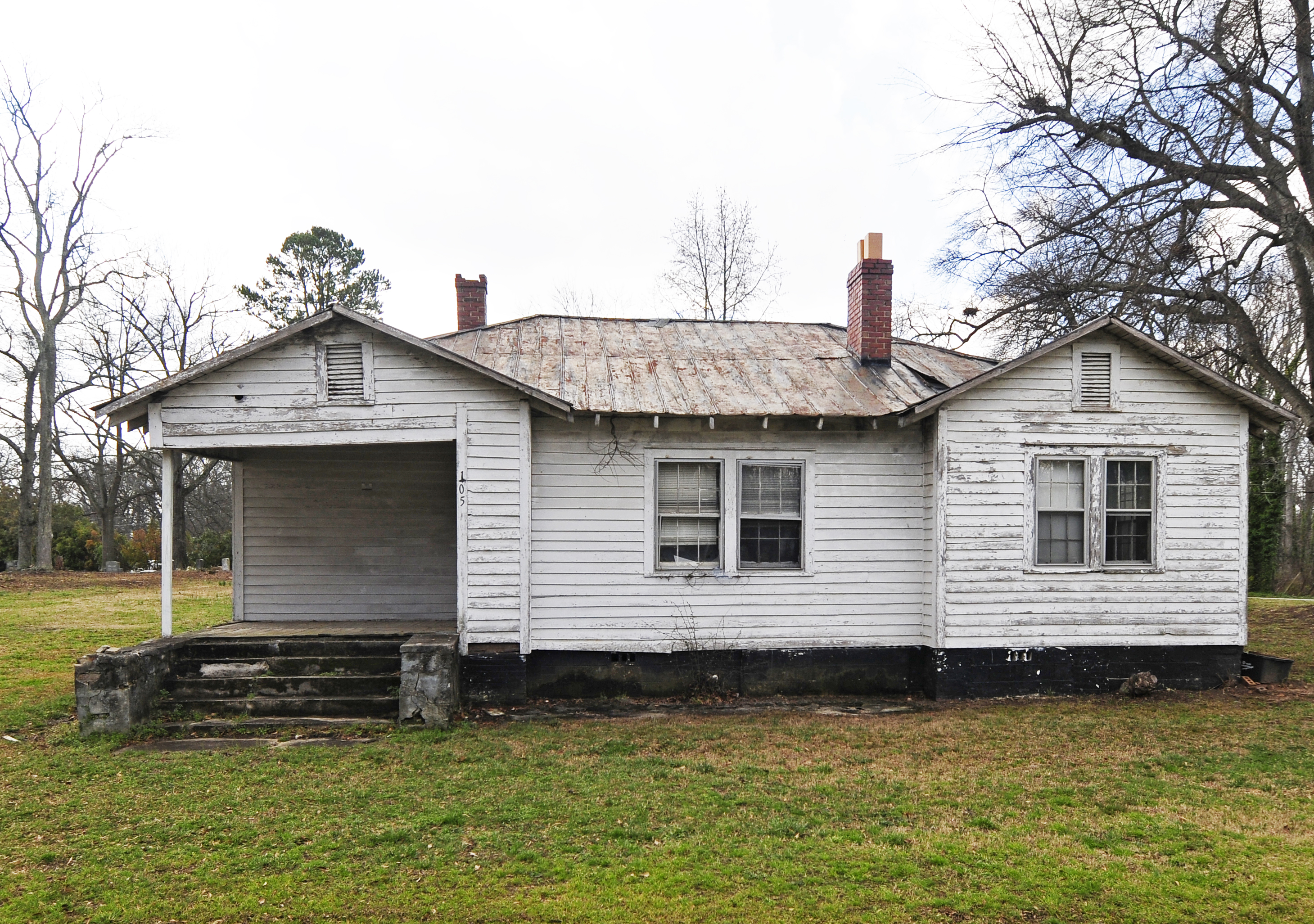
- Fountain Inn Principal's House and Teacherage, February 2012

- Location within South Carolina Location within the United States
- Location: 105 Mt. Zion Dr., Fountain Inn, South Carolina
- Coordinates: 34°41′47″N 82°11′33″W
- Area: Less than one acre
- Built: 1935
- NRHP reference No.: 11000415
- Added to NRHP: June 27, 2011

Fountain Inn Principal's House and Teacherage is a historic home and teacherage located at Fountain Inn, Greenville County, South Carolina. It was built in 1935 as a home for teachers, and is the only remaining building associated with the Fountain Inn Negro School complex. The complex once included a grade school built in 1928, a high school built in 1930, a library, and the Clayton "Peg Leg" Bates Gymnasium, built in 1942. The school and its appurtenant buildings served the educational needs of Fountain Inn's African American community until the students of this community were enrolled in Fountain Inn High School in the 1960s.

It was listed on the National Register of Historic Places in 2011.
