= Tullyton =

- U.S. National Register of Historic Places
- U.S. Historic district
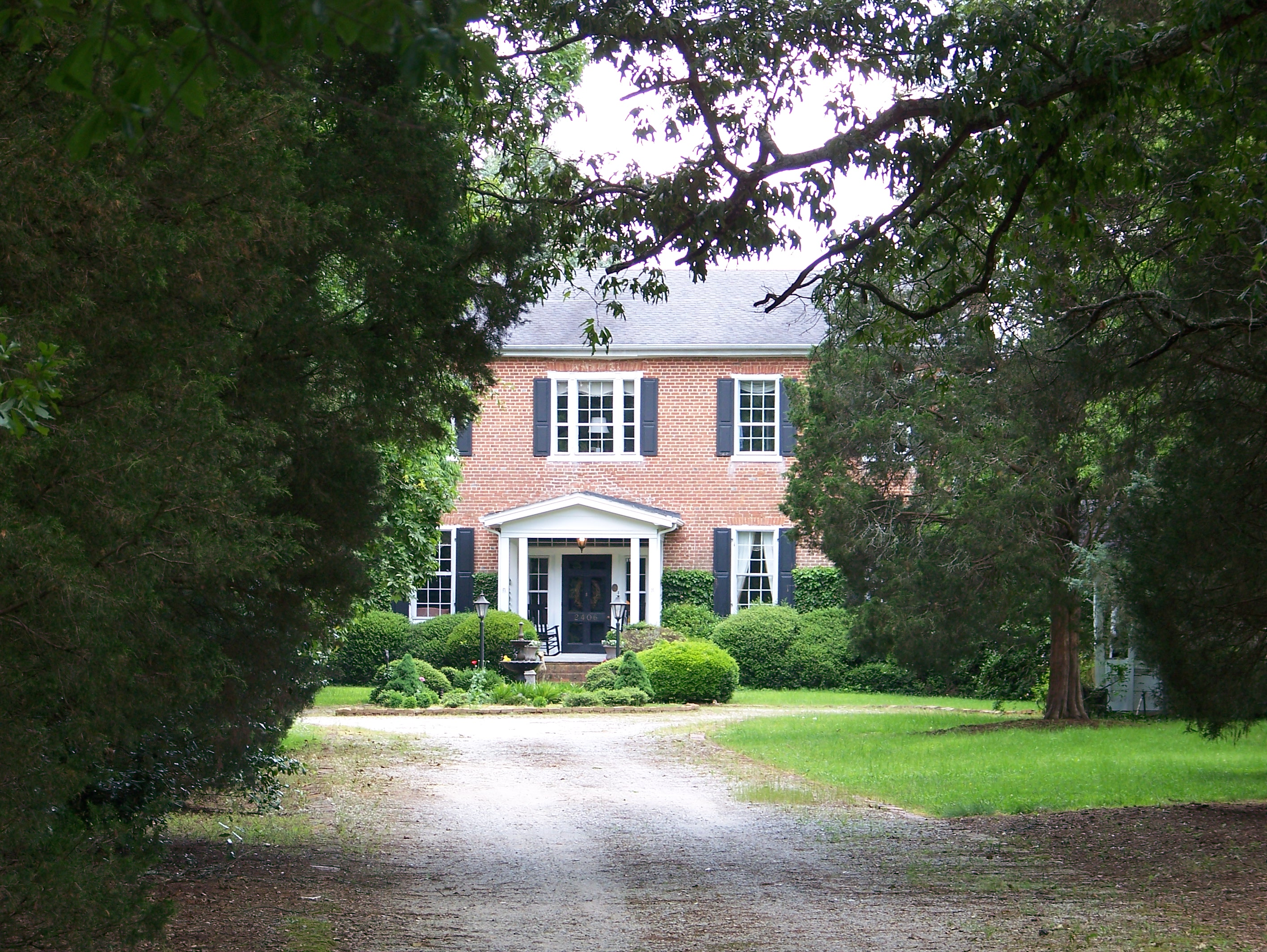

- Location within South Carolina Location within the United States
- Location: 2604 Fairview Road (S-23-55)
- Nearest city: Fountain Inn, South Carolina
- Coordinates: 34.606771°N 82.232288°W
- Area: 5.8 acres (2.3 ha)
- Built: 1839
- Architectural style: Greek Revival, Federal
- NRHP reference No.: 89002151
- Added to NRHP: July 31, 1990

Tullyton, also known as the Bolling-Stewart House, is a historic property located in Greenville County near Fountain Inn, South Carolina. The historic property includes a ca1839 house and the adjacent ruins of a house built ca1821. Both the house and ruins were originally constructed in brick, a feature uncommon in the area during the time they were constructed.

== Ruins ==
The ca1821 two-story brick shell house was built on a stone foundation and served not only as a house but also as the community post office and store. It was built by Tully F. Sullivan, the first postmaster at the location. The post office at the location was closed in 1848. After its closure as a post office, the building served as a detached kitchen and servant quarters for the main house. While the roof and floors were removed and a section of the second story wall collapsed, the chimneys and remaining walls of the building still stand.

== House ==
The ca1839 two-story, load-bearing masonry building designed in the late Federal-early Greek Revival style, was built by Thaddeus Choice Bolling, a business partner of Tully F Sullivan, who was the last postmaster of the Tullyton post office. The house and property was purchased in 1859 by Reverend Clark B Stewart, who served as the minister of the nearby Fairview Presbyterian Church.

The brick of the house was laid in a five-course American bond. All of the double-hung sash windows have stuccoed jack arch lintels. Both the north and south facades are identical. The interior design of the house is a central hall plan. The original woodwork, including a pegged mortice-and-tenon-joined staircase handrail, is intact.

The house and property remained in the Stewart family until Laurie Gray took ownership in 1942. In August 1971, William and Mary Lasley purchased the house and 150 acres from the estate of Laurie Gray. After restoring and enjoying the home and property for many years, the Lasley’s sold the house and 20 acres in 1988 to a local doctor.
