= F. W. Welborn House =

- U.S. National Register of Historic Places
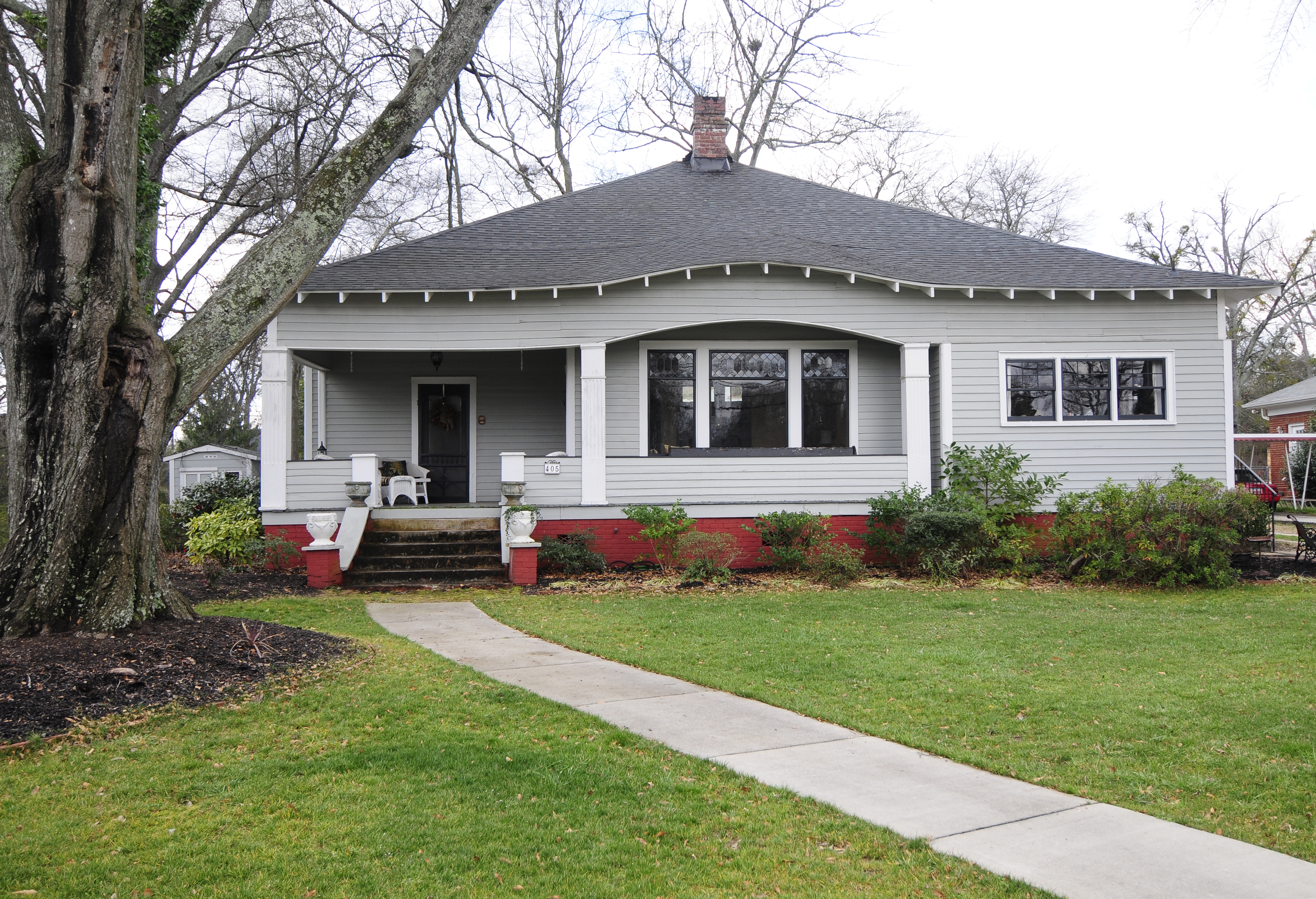
- F. W. Welborn House, 2012

- Location within South Carolina Location within the United States
- Location: 405 N. Weston Street, Fountain Inn, South Carolina
- Coordinates: 34.697583°N 82.202512°W
- Area: 1 acre (0.40 ha)
- Built: 1914
- Architectural style: Bungalow/Craftsman
- NRHP reference No.: 10000920
- Added to NRHP: November 23, 2010

The F. W. Welborn House is located in Fountain Inn, South Carolina. The one-story Craftsman style bungalow was built in 1914 for Frank W. Welborn. It was one of the first houses in the city and is one of the most representative residential examples of the Craftsman style in the city.

The house features a brick foundation with weatherboard siding and an internal brick chimney. The house retains the majority of its original detailing, including original pine and oak flooring, trim, molding and detailing.
