= Woodside Cotton Mill Village Historic District =

Historic district in South Carolina, United States

- U.S. National Register of Historic Places
- U.S. Historic district
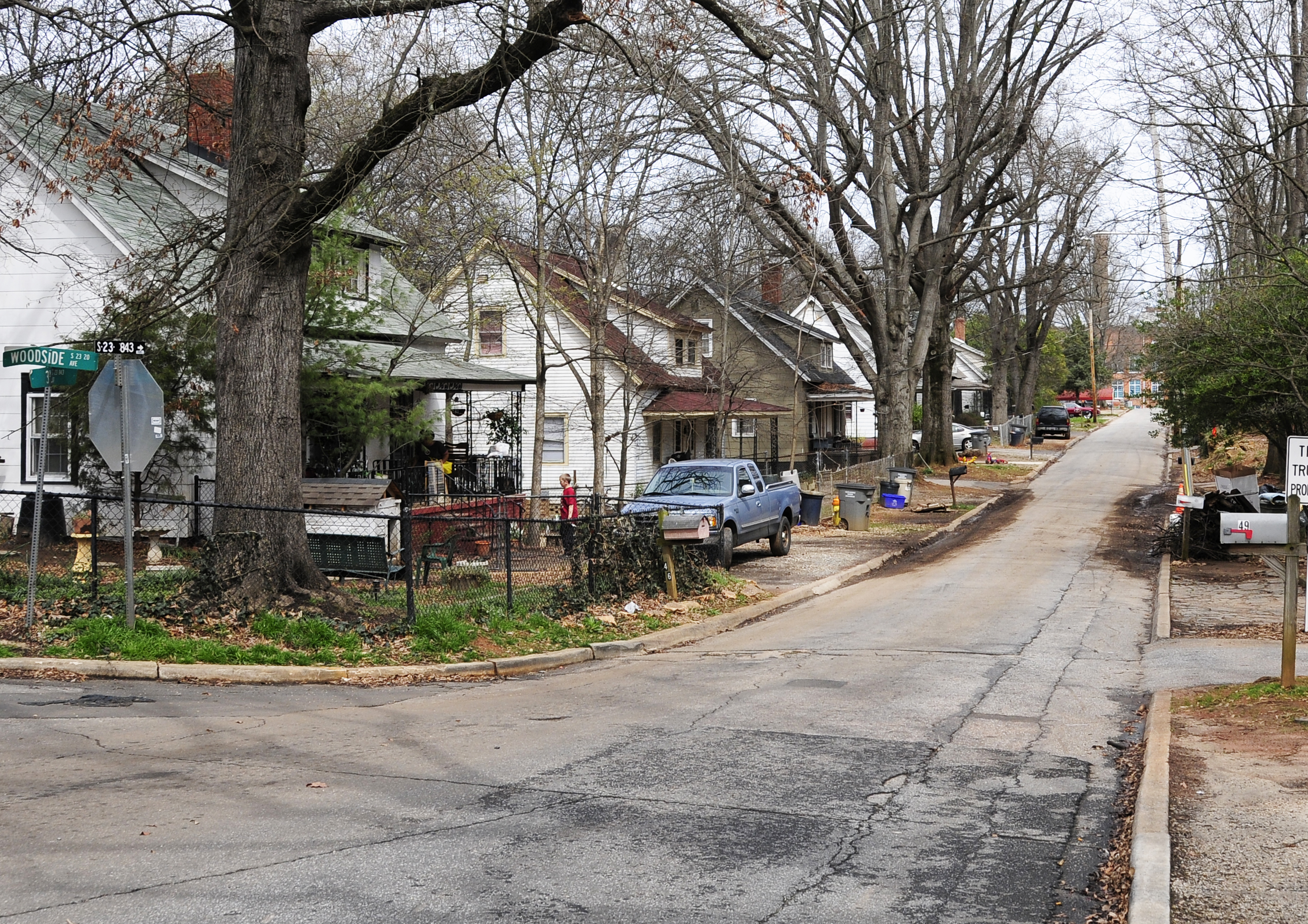
- Woodside Cotton Mill Village, March 2012

- Location within South Carolina Location within the United States
- Location: Woodside Ave. and E. Main St., Woodside, South Carolina
- Coordinates: 34°56′16″N 82°13′43″W
- Area: 162.4 acres (65.7 ha)
- Built: 1902
- Built by: Sirrine, Joseph E.
- NRHP reference No.: 87000678
- Added to NRHP: April 30, 1987

Woodside Cotton Mill Village Historic District is a national historic district located in Greenville County, South Carolina. The district encompasses 278 contributing buildings and 2 contributing sites in an early 20th century urban South Carolina textile mill village. Centered on a mill founded by John T. Woodside in 1902, the district is located just west of the city limits of Greenville and is largely intact despite modernizations made by a succession of mill and home owners. The mill itself is a rectangular, brick, four-story building designed by J.E. Sirrine and built between 1902 and 1912. Eventually the mill became the largest cotton mill under one roof in the United States and one of the largest in the world.

The village contains 343 surviving mill houses, a cotton waste house, a mill office building, a recreation building, two churches, a baseball park, and a pasture/common garden area.

The mill and mill village were listed on the National Register of Historic Places in 1987. Several plans to convert the empty mill to apartments, senior housing, or artist studios have not been achieved due to lack of financing. In 2021, Woodside Mill was converted into loft-style apartments, opening as The Lofts at Woodside Mill.

Photographs of the mill, village, and community can be viewed in the Greenville County Library System digital collections.
