= McDowell House =

- U.S. National Register of Historic Places
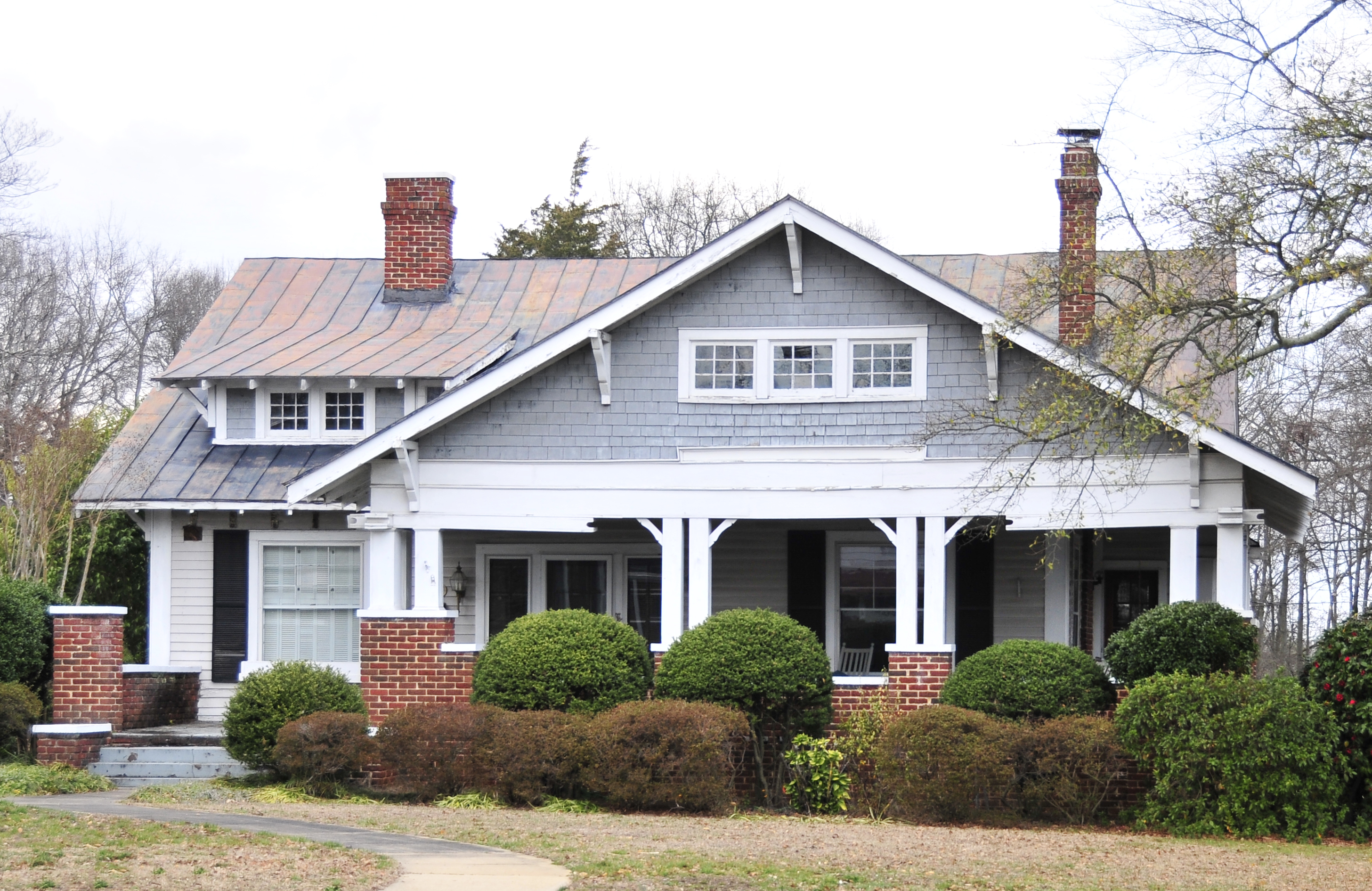
- McDowell House, 2012

- Location within South Carolina Location within the United States
- Location: 500 Main Street, Fountain Inn, South Carolina
- Coordinates: 34.69777°N 82.204822°W
- Area: .93 acres (0.38 ha)
- Built: 1922
- NRHP reference No.: 10000921
- Added to NRHP: November 17, 2010

The McDowell House is a National Register of Historic Places property located in Fountain Inn, South Carolina, United States. The Craftsman style bungalow was built in 1922 by J. B. Wasson for his sister, Quentine Wasson McDowell.

The house features a cross-gabled front porch supported by wooden pillars on brick piers, exposed rafters, wide overhanging eaves, a pergola, and original interior details including wood flooring, window and door surrounds, fireplace surrounds and trim. The pine and oak used in its construction came from nearby property owned by J. B. Wasson.

The front-gabled frame garage to the rear of the house, likely built at the same time as the house, has exterior detailing consistent with the main house including weatherboard siding and a tin roof.
