= Pelham Mills Site =

- Pelham Mills Site (38GR165)
- U.S. National Register of Historic Places
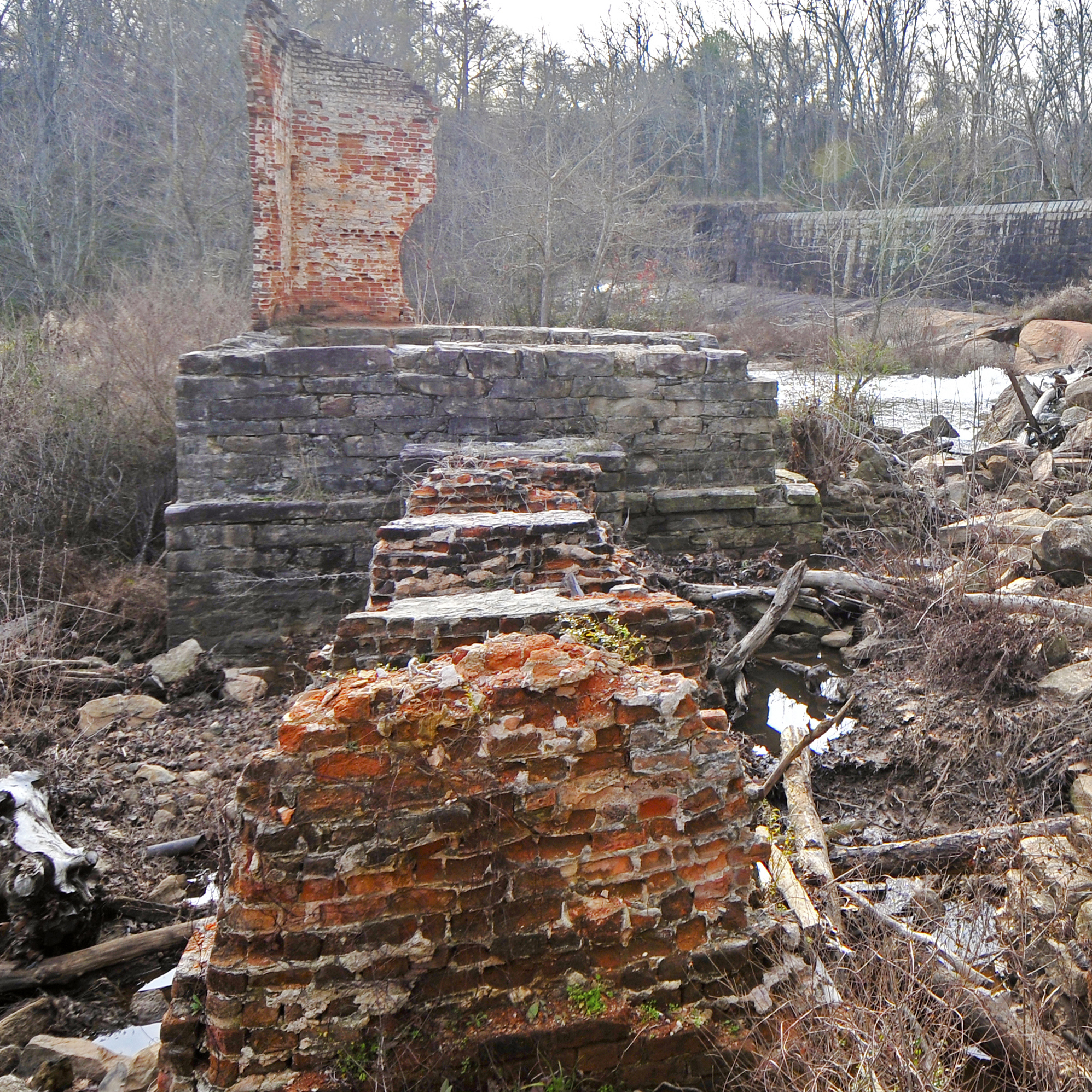
- Pelham Mill Site, 2011

- Location within South Carolina Location within the United States
- Nearest city: Pelham, South Carolina
- Coordinates: 34.8571°N 82.2266°W
- Area: 6.8 acres (2.8 ha)
- NRHP reference No.: 87001954
- Added to NRHP: November 19, 1987

The Pelham Mills Site, sometimes referred to as the Buena Vista Factory, Hutchings Factory, or the Lester Factory, is the site of the ruins of the Pelham Mills cotton factory near Greer, South Carolina, on the shores of the Enoree River. Included on the property are stone and brick foundations, the bases of two steam smokestacks, brick pilings, and a mortared stone dam with six sluice gates across the Enoree River.

The mill, believed to be the first cotton mill in the Greenville District, was first founded in 1820 as the Hutchings Factory by the Reverend Thomas Hutchings. In 1827, the property was purchased by Philip C. Lester and was known as Lester Factory. By 1850, the property was known as the Buena Vista Factory and retained that name until 1880 when it was sold to the Pelham Manufacturing Company, who in 1882, incorporated their property under the name The Pelham Mills. By 1940 the mill had been vacated. A fire in the 1940s destroyed the entire mill complex.

A portion of the property was donated to the county by the Greenville County Historic Preservation Commission in 1988, used to create the Pelham Mill Park.
