= Vardry McBee =

American entrepreneur and philanthropist (1775–1864)

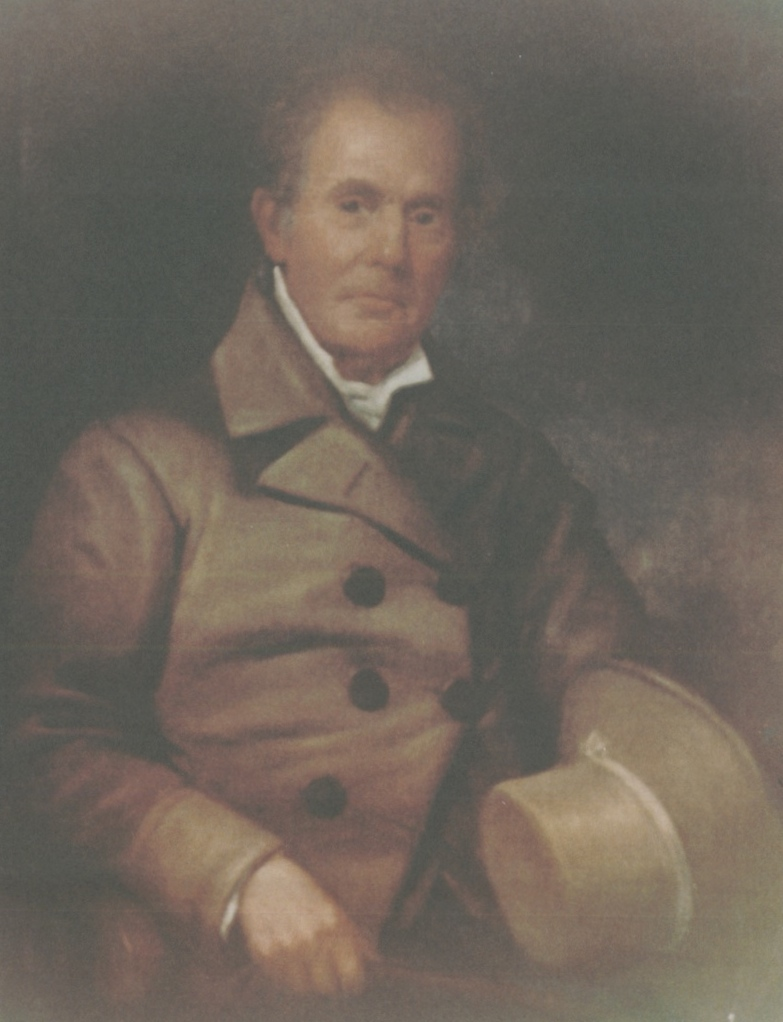
- by William Garl Browne (1823–1894), 1854
- Born: June 19, 1775; Spartanburg District, South Carolina, U.S.
- Died: January 23, 1864 (aged 88); Brushy Creek, Greenville, South Carolina, U.S.
- Burial place: Christ Episcopal Church, Greenville
- Title: Esquire
- Spouse: Jane Alexander (m. 1804)
- Children: 9, and Wilson Cooke

Vardry Echols McBee (June 19, 1775 – January 23, 1864) was an American saddlemaker, merchant, farmer, entrepreneur and philanthropist who has frequently been called, "the father of Greenville, South Carolina".

== Youth ==
McBee, the youngest of ten children, was born to an impecunious Revolutionary War officer in the Spartanburg District of South Carolina and reared in Thicketty. After working on his parents' farm as a teenager, in 1794, he was apprenticed to his brother-in-law, a saddler and postmaster in Lincolnton, North Carolina. Briefly a clerk at a grocery in Charleston, South Carolina, and a pioneer farmer with his parents in Logan County, Kentucky, McBee returned to Lincolnton as a saddler and merchant, where he prospered and, in 1804, married Jane Alexander, the daughter of a prominent local family. They had nine children, seven of whom survived to maturity.

McBee may also have had children by a slave mistress. McBee's putative black son, Wilson Cooke, was a member of the South Carolina legislature during Reconstruction; and Cooke's son, William Wilson Cooke, was an architect and educator.

In 1806, McBee was partially, but permanently, lamed when he was thrown from a horse and broke his leg.

== Farmer and entrepreneur ==
After buying up worn-out land abandoned by westward immigrants, McBee practiced new methods of restoring the fertility of the soil, such as drainage, the use of manures, crop rotation, and seed selection. In 1815 he purchased from Lemuel J. Alston more than 11,000 of acres of land in South Carolina, including the heart of what is today Greenville. He established a number of small industrial works on the Reedy River, including a sawmill, ironworks, brick yard, and stone quarry. McBee also engaged in selling leather goods, locating his tannery on the outskirts of the village. In 1829, he built a stone mill in Greenville and a flour mill and paper mill seven miles down stream in modern Conestee. McBee used the same mill to operate cotton and woolen factories, ordering textile machinery from the New Jersey firm of Rogers, Ketchum & Grosvenor. McBee's cotton and woolen products were apparently competitive with those produced by the Northern textile industry. DeBow's Review reported that they sold in New York for "a handsome profit."

McBee operated general stores in Greenville and Conestee, effectively company stores where his employees could make purchases on credit. He also provided housing for his workers. By 1838, his factory operated around the clock with shift changes at midnight. McBee also owned two gold mines in Greenville County and extracted enough gold to have bars transported to the mint in Philadelphia. In 1830, when the population of Greenville was about 600, McBee owned two grist mills, a sawmill, an iron works, a saddlery, tan yards, and a brick yard. Finally, in 1836 McBee and his family moved permanently to Greenville, building the Brushy Creek home on property he had owned since 1815.

== Railroad promoter ==
In the 1830s, McBee became a promoter of railroads, and he briefly served as president of the Louisville, Cincinnati and Charleston Railroad in 1839. In 1852, when the Greenville and Columbia Railroad was about to fail, McBee saved it by subscribing $50,000, a contribution that Debow's called "the largest individual subscription ever made to a Rail-road in the United States."

== Unionist ==
A unionist, though a slave owner, McBee opposed South Carolina's flirtation with secession in 1853. In 1860, after South Carolina voted for secession, McBee told what amounted to a public celebration in Greenville that he was sorry the Union could not continue and that South Carolina must avoid war, that the North was very strong. In 1862, McBee sold his Reedy River Factory, a paper mill, and 321 acres, and these were placed at the disposal of the Confederacy. Greenville was also chosen as the site of the State Military Works because McBee gave South Carolina twenty acres of land to build on. McBee died two years later in his 89th year.

== Personality ==
McBee was reared as a Quaker, and he continued to wear clothing of drab colors throughout his life. He regularly attended services of various denominations and remained private about his religious views, though he was baptized a Presbyterian shortly before his death. McBee donated land in downtown Greenville for the Baptist, Methodist, Episcopal, and Presbyterian churches; and in Conestee he built an octagonal chapel for his workers. Although McBee was never a member, Christ Church Episcopal elected him to its vestry. McBee also contributed land for the construction of male and female academies, and when the Baptist Convention decided to move Furman University to Greenville, McBee sold it fifty choice acres along the Reedy River for perhaps half its market value.

Debow's described McBee as "small, with a mild and pleasing expression of face. In his manners, he is kind and gentle, with the simplicity of a child. Seldom is he excited by anything, but there is in him a sleeping passion, which is sometimes roused....In morality, and all the proprieties of life, Mr. McBee has no superior. His habits are all strictly temperate and methodical. He is a man of great industry and activity of life. He retires to bed early, and rises before daylight every morning. He breakfasts very early, and then employs himself in riding and superintending his business till dinner....[V]ery few men who have made their fortunes have appropriated so much of them to public purposes, and, to the support of honest industry, to the improvement of their country in her agriculture, manufactures. schools, houses, and public buildings, rail-roads, &c.....There are some men whose judgment seems unerring, and who have an intuitive notion of success. Vardry McBee is one of that class, and like all truly great men, is without pride, ostentation, or pretension."

== Memorials ==
Greenville has both a Vardry Street and a McBee Avenue. An octagonal church in Conestee is named for McBee. In 2002, a life-size bronze statue of McBee by sculptor T. J. Dixon of San Diego was dedicated in downtown Greenville, its cost of $35,000 having been partially paid for by $5,000 contributions from each of the five downtown churches to whom McBee had given land.

== Bibliography ==
- Ray Belcher, Greenville County, South Carolina: From Cotton Fields to the Textile Center of the World (Charleston: The History Press, 2006).
- Alexia Jones Helsley, Hidden History of Greenville County (Charleston: The History Press, 2009)
- "Vardry McBee of South Carolina," DeBow's Review, 13 (1852), 314–18.
- Roy McBee Smith, Vardry McBee, 1775–1864: Man of Reason in an Age of Extremes 2nd ed. (Spartanburg, SC: Laurel Heritage Press, 1997).
