= McBee Methodist Church =

Historic church in South Carolina, United States

- U.S. National Register of Historic Places
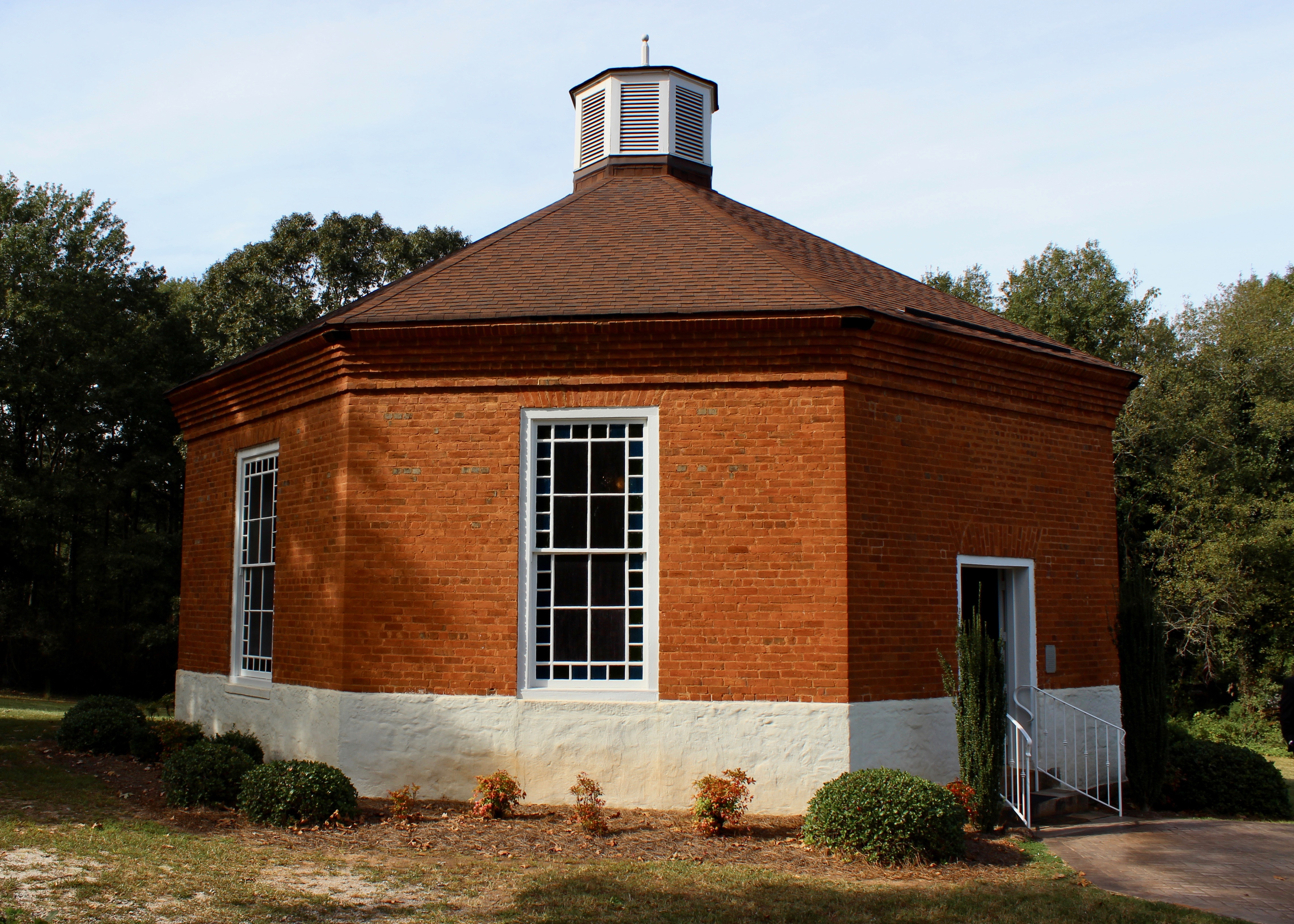
- McBee Methodist Church, 2017

- Location within South Carolina Location within the United States
- Location: Conestee, South Carolina
- Coordinates: 34°46′0″N 82°21′10″W
- Area: 1 acre (0.40 ha)
- Built: 1842
- Architect: John Adams
- Architectural style: Octagon Mode
- NRHP reference No.: 72001212
- Added to NRHP: March 23, 1972

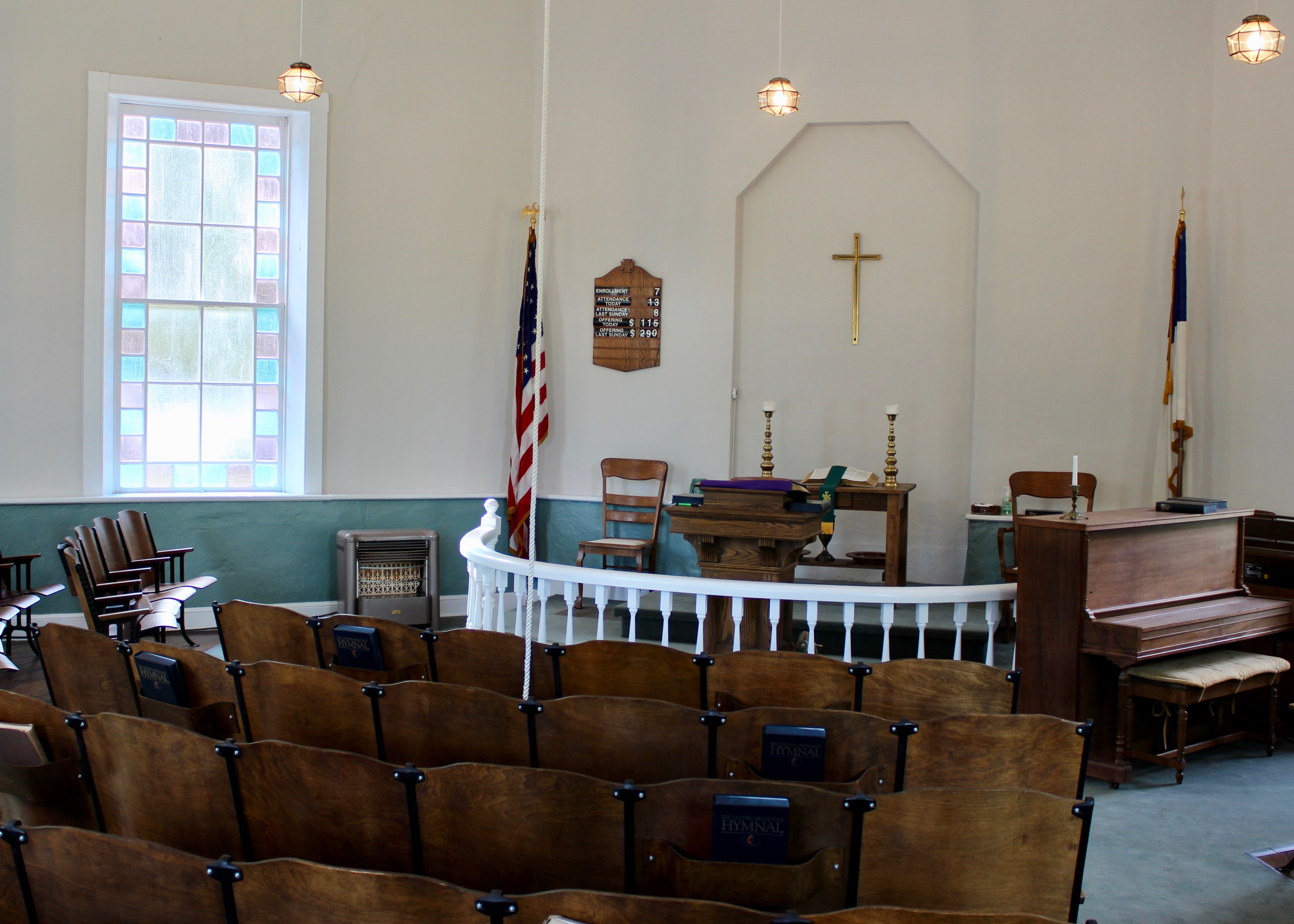
Interior, McBee Methodist Church; white bell rope, center.

McBee Methodist Church, also known as McBee Chapel, is an octagonal, brick, United Methodist church building on Main Street in Conestee, Greenville County, South Carolina. Built in 1856, it was designed by millwright John Adams and named for Vardry McBee (1775–1864), the "Father of Greenville," whose son donated the money to build it. The church was built with a balcony used by slaves. When the balcony was removed sometime following the Civil War, its separate door, to the left of the main entrance, was converted into another window.

The church was added to the National Register of Historic Places on March 23, 1972.
