= Robert Quillen Office and Library =

- U.S. National Register of Historic Places
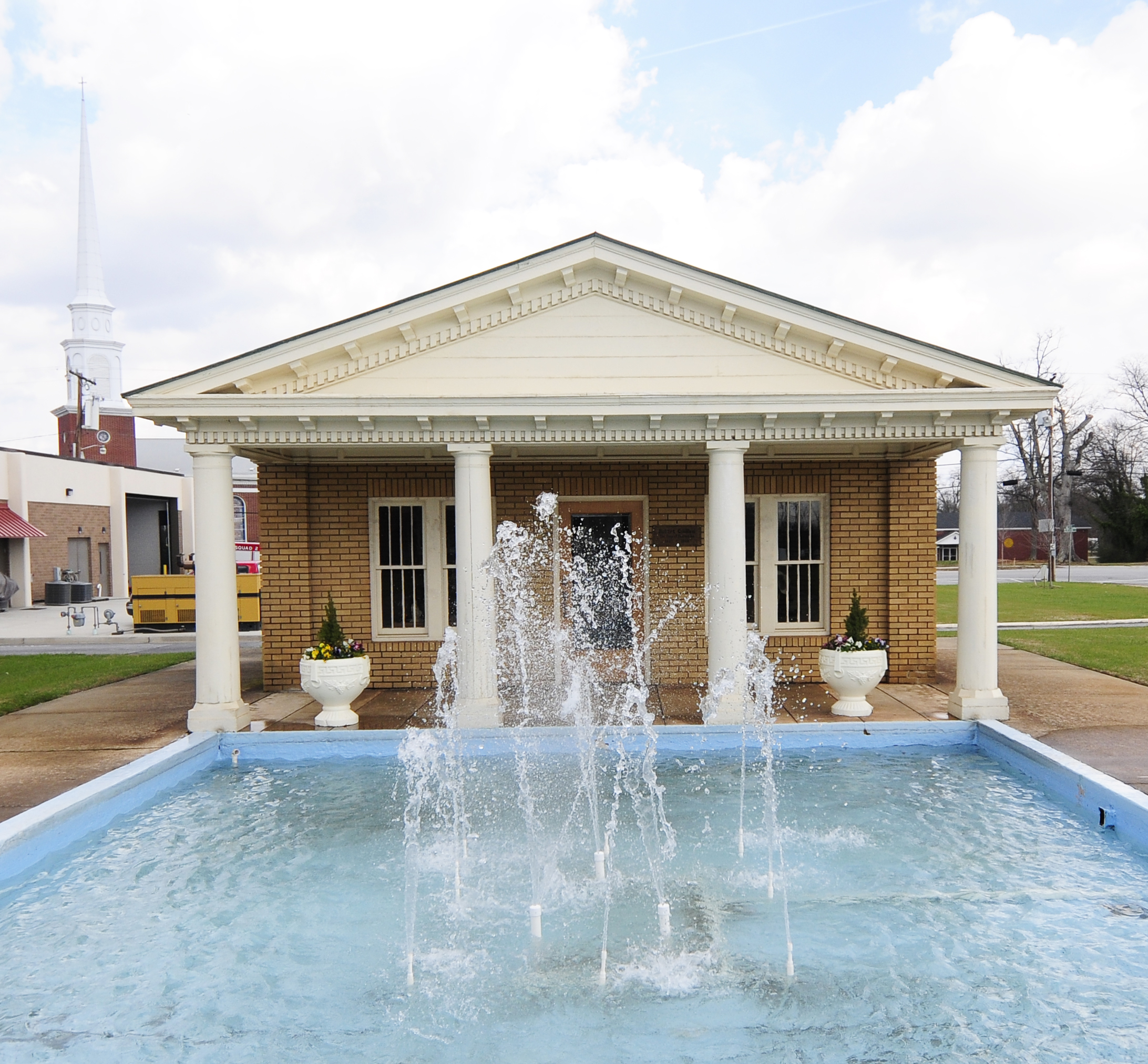
- Robert Quillen Office and Library, February 2012

- Location within South Carolina Location within the United States
- Location: 200 N. Main St., Fountain Inn, South Carolina
- Coordinates: 34°41′40″N 82°12′01″W
- Area: Less than one acre
- Built: 1928
- NRHP reference No.: 10000316
- Added to NRHP: January 30, 2012

Robert Quillen Office and Library is an historic office and library building located at Fountain Inn, Greenville County, South Carolina. It was built in 1928, and is a small one-story, one-room brick Neo-Classical Revival building with a distinctive temple front. Directly in front of the Office are a rectangular reflecting pool and a round pool, and a granite obelisk known as the "Monument to Eve." Born in 1887 in Syracuse, Kansas, Robert Quillen moved to Fountain Inn in 1911 to start the Fountain Inn Tribune. He wrote paragraphs, editorials, one-liners, and cartoons for the Baltimore Sun, the Saturday Evening Post, and The American Magazine. Quillen died after a prolonged illness on December 9, 1948.

The building was listed on the National Register of Historic Places in 2012.
