= Fountain Inn, South Carolina =

Fountain Inn
- City
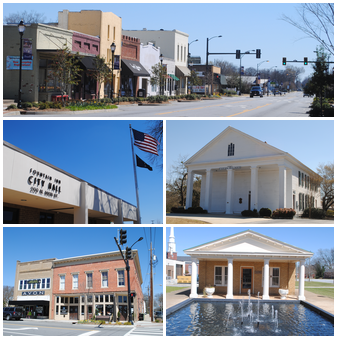
- Top, left to right: Downtown Fountain Inn, Fountain Inn City Hall, Cannon Building, Fairview Presbyterian Church, Robert Quillen Office and Library

- Flag Seal

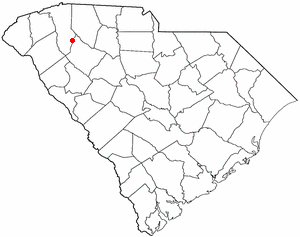
- Location of Fountain Inn, South Carolina
- Coordinates: 34°41′50″N 82°12′11″W
- Country: United States
- State: South Carolina
- Counties: Greenville, Laurens

Area
  - Total: 8.50 sq mi (22.01 km^{2})
  - Land: 8.45 sq mi (21.89 km^{2})
  - Water: 0.050 sq mi (0.13 km^{2})
- Elevation: 866 ft (264 m)

Population (2020)
  - Total: 10,416
  - Density: 1,233/sq mi (475.9/km^{2})
- Time zone: UTC−5 (Eastern (EST))
  - Summer (DST): UTC−4 (EDT)
- ZIP code: 29644
- Area codes: 864, 821
- FIPS code: 45-27070
- GNIS feature ID: 2403653
- Website: www.fountaininn.org

Fountain Inn is a city in Greenville and Laurens counties in the U.S. state of South Carolina. The population was 10,416 at the 2020 census, up from 7,799 in 2010. It is part of the Greenville-Mauldin-Easley Metropolitan Statistical Area.

== History ==
The Cannon Building, Fairview Presbyterian Church, Fountain Inn High School, Fountain Inn Principal's House and Teacherage, McDowell House, Robert Quillen Office and Library, Tullyton, and F. W. Welborn House are listed on the National Register of Historic Places.

== Geography ==
The southern part of the city is in Laurens County, while the bulk of the city is in Greenville County. The city's nickname is "The Diamond Tip of the Golden Strip". The city took its name from an inn and fountain that were along the old stagecoach route. The stagecoach drivers called the stop "Fountain Inn", and it stuck. A small garden fountain is installed at City Hall, and there is a marker on the north side of town showing the former location of the old inn.

South Carolina Highway 14 runs through the center of town as Main Street, and Interstate 385 runs along the southern edge of the city, with access from Exits 22, 23, and 26. Greenville is 17 miles (27 km) to the northwest, and Columbia is 84 miles (135 km) to the southeast. Via Highway 14, Laurens is 16 miles (26 km) to the southeast.

According to the U.S. Census Bureau, the city of Fountain Inn has a total area of 7.9 square miles (20.5 km^{2}), of which 0.04 square miles (0.1 km^{2}), or 0.43%, are water.

There are several festivals in Fountain Inn, including Aunt Het Day, based on syndicated cartoon columnist Robert Quillen, that brings in several hundred visitors as Main Street is closed and filled with many unique vendors.

== Demographics ==
Historical population
Census	Pop.	Note	%±
1890	212		—
1900	497		134.4%
1910	979		97.0%
1920	1,100		12.4%
1930	1,264		14.9%
1940	1,346		6.5%
1950	1,325		−1.6%
1960	2,385		80.0%
1970	3,391		42.2%
1980	4,226		24.6%
1990	4,388		3.8%
2000	6,017		37.1%
2010	7,799		29.6%
2020	10,416		33.6%
2025 (est.)	14,722	▲	41.3%
U.S. Decennial Census

As of 2023, of the 10,416 people, about 7,777 are in Greenville County and about 2,639 are in Laurens County.

=== 2020 census ===
As of the 2020 census, Fountain Inn had a population of 10,416. The median age was 36.6 years. 25.2% of residents were under the age of 18 and 14.4% of residents were 65 years of age or older. For every 100 females there were 88.0 males, and for every 100 females age 18 and over there were 84.7 males age 18 and over.

99.2% of residents lived in urban areas, while 0.8% lived in rural areas.

There were 3,979 households in Fountain Inn, of which 38.1% had children under the age of 18 living in them. Of all households, 45.6% were married-couple households, 16.4% were households with a male householder and no spouse or partner present, and 31.3% were households with a female householder and no spouse or partner present. About 23.8% of all households were made up of individuals and 8.9% had someone living alone who was 65 years of age or older.

There were 4,244 housing units, of which 6.2% were vacant. The homeowner vacancy rate was 1.9% and the rental vacancy rate was 9.3%.

Racial composition as of the 2020 census
Race	Number	Percent
White	6,063	58.2%
Black or African American	3,032	29.1%
American Indian and Alaska Native	31	0.3%
Asian	69	0.7%
Native Hawaiian and Other Pacific Islander	19	0.2%
Some other race	482	4.6%
Two or more races	720	6.9%
Hispanic or Latino (of any race)	1,019	9.8%

== Government ==
Fountain Inn is governed by a mayor, a city council, a city administrator, and several boards and commissions. The current officeholders are:

City council

- Mayor: G.P. McLeer
- Council Ward I: Jason Sanders
- Council Ward II: Jay Thomasson
- Council Ward III: AJ Dearybury
- Council Ward IV: Phil Clemmer
- Council Ward V: John Don
- Council Ward VI: Mack Blackstone

== Crime ==
The city of Fountain Inn has one of the lowest crime rates in Greenville County and has the best record in closing case files of towns of similar sizes and geographic area. The Fountain Inn Police Department has annual reports and information regarding current records and statistical surveys of the area.

== Education ==
Residents in both counties are in the Greenville County School District.

== Notable people ==
Fountain Inn was the home town of one-legged tap dancer Clayton "Peg Leg" Bates.

Fountain Inn was the adopted home of journalist and humorist Robert Quillen, during the early decades of the 20th century.

Fountain Inn is the home town of Travelle Wharton, a retired NFL offensive lineman.

== See also ==
Fountain Inn High School
