= Fairview Presbyterian Church (Fountain Inn, South Carolina) =

Historic church in South Carolina, United States

- U.S. National Register of Historic Places
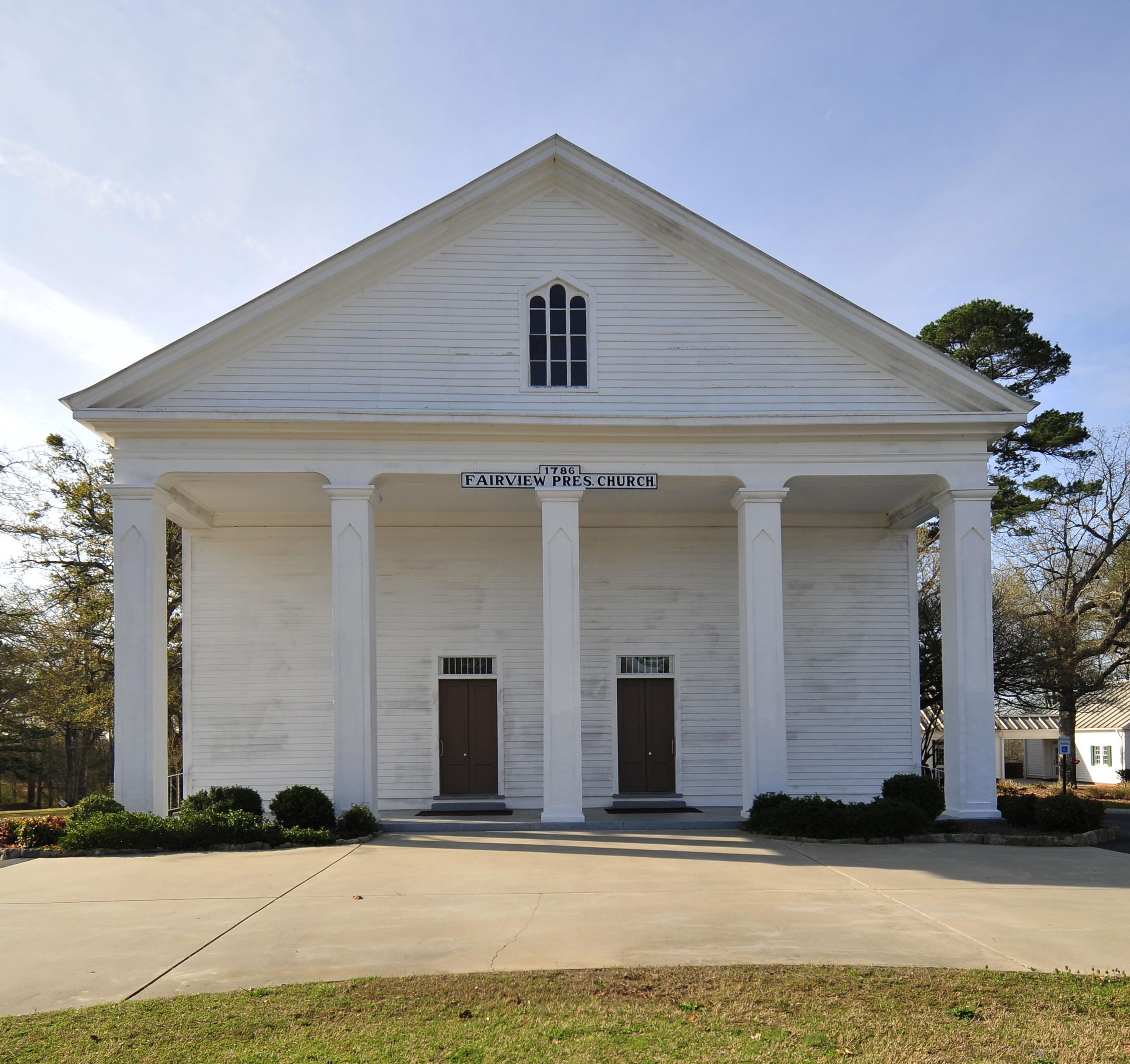
- Fairview Presbyterian Church, 2012

- Location within South Carolina Location within the United States
- Nearest city: Fountain Inn, South Carolina
- Coordinates: 34°38′37″N 82°15′5″W
- Area: 6 acres (2.4 ha)
- Built: 1858
- Architectural style: Greek Revival
- NRHP reference No.: 77001224
- Added to NRHP: August 16, 1977

Fairview Presbyterian Church is a historic church listed on the National Register of Historic Places near Fountain Inn, South Carolina, United States. The present two-story building, constructed in 1858 in the Greek Revival style, was the fourth building constructed by the church, which was founded in 1786.

The building is in nearly original condition. It features white clapboard siding, a tin roof, a pedimented portico and five square masonry front columns constructed from brick reclaimed from the previous church building. The pulpit and pews are original.
