= Fountain Inn High School =

- U.S. National Register of Historic Places
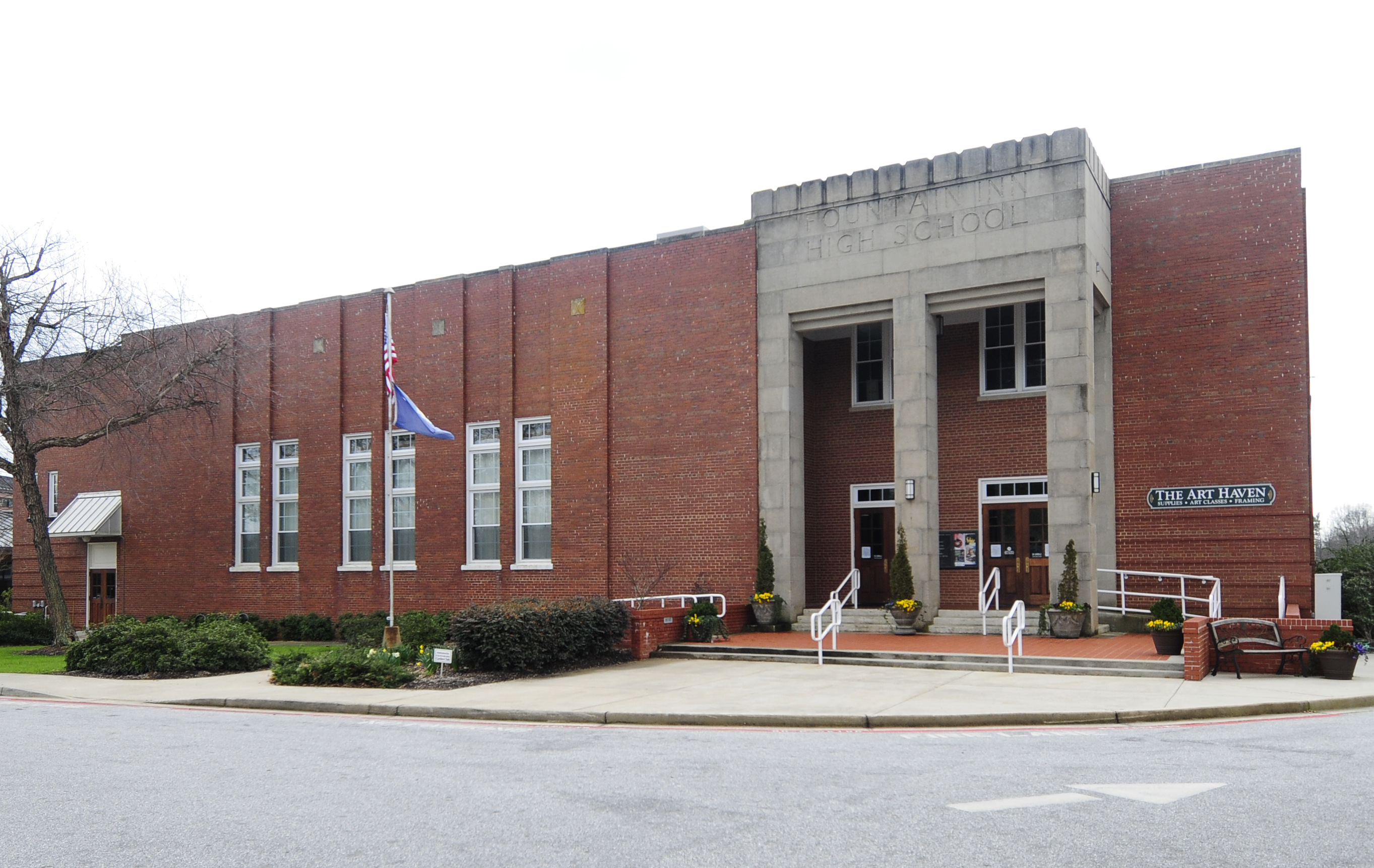
- Fountain Inn High School

- Location within South Carolina Location within the United States
- Location: 315 N. Main St., Fountain Inn, South Carolina
- Coordinates: 34°41′46″N 82°12′14″W
- Area: 4.5 acres (1.8 ha)
- Built: 1939 (87 years ago)
- Built by: Gallivan Construction Company
- Architect: Beacham and LeGrand
- Architectural style: Moderne
- NRHP reference No.: 09000390
- Added to NRHP: June 3, 2009

The Fountain Inn High School was a building that formerly served as a high school, located in Fountain Inn, South Carolina. It was designed by the Greenville, South Carolina based architectural firm Beacham and LeGrand and built in 1939. An example of New Deal-era design in the Moderne style, its construction was undertaken using grants by the Public Works Administration program.

The T-shaped two-story building on a basement has exterior brick walls set on concrete footings. The original 800-seat auditorium has hardwood flooring on the main floor as well as the stage floor. The ceiling features period art deco style patterned panels and lights. The sides of the auditorium are covered in wood panels.

The building served as the high school for the town for only 17 years, until the construction of Hillcrest High School was completed just outside the town. In 1957 when the new high school opened, the building became Fountain Inn Elementary School until a new school was constructed in 1997. The building was purchased by the city from the Greenville County School District in 1999. As the Fountain Inn Center for Visual and Performing Arts, it served the city of Fountain Inn by featuring traveling acts, a resident orchestra, a theater company and an arts academy.

In 2013, the building was renamed the Younts Center for Performing Arts and began a multi-phase remodeling project that includes renovation to the theater, the lobby and the exterior.

A new high school has been built and opened in August 2021.
