= Conestee, South Carolina =

- Census-designated place
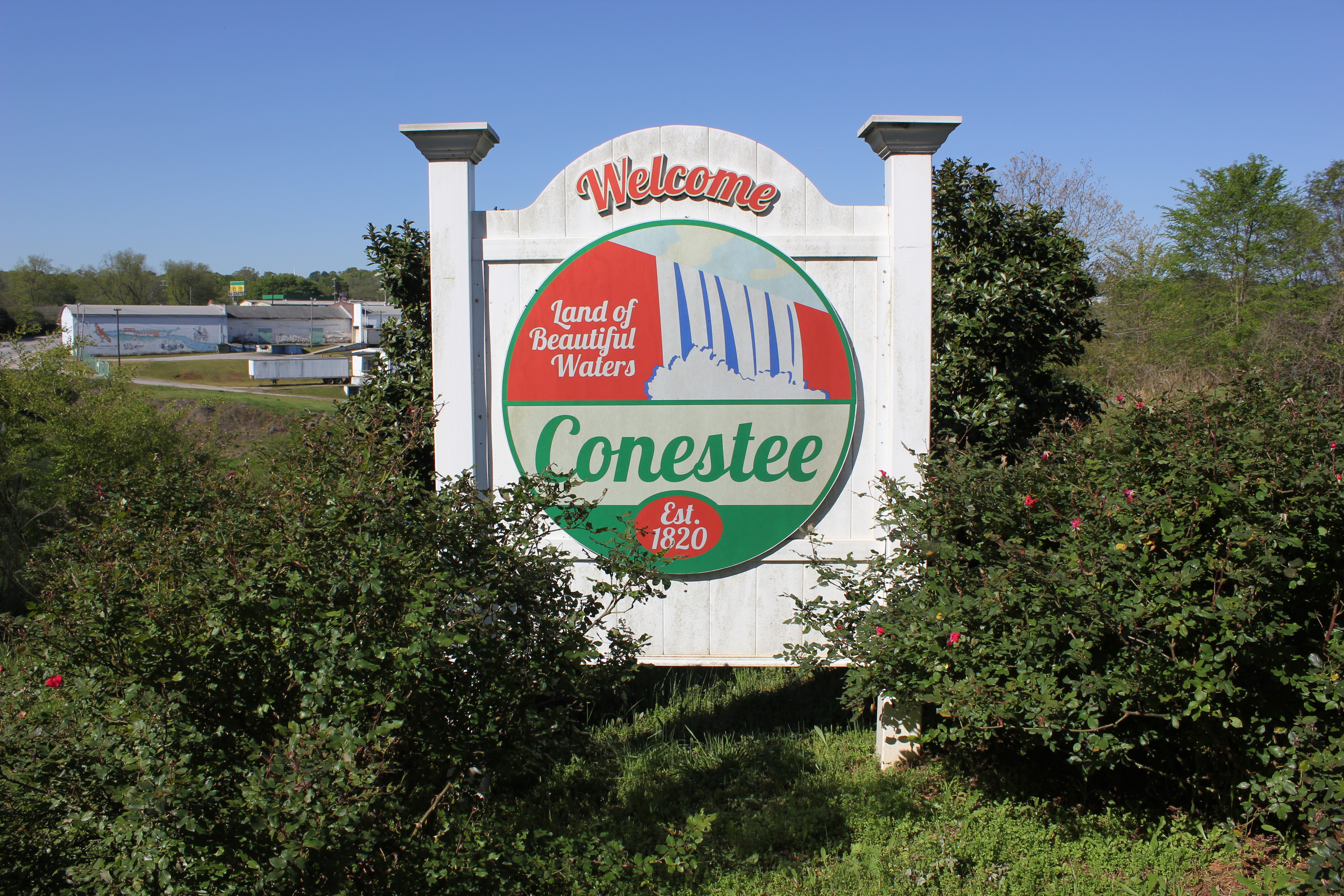

- Location within South Carolina Location within the United States
- Coordinates: 34°45′50″N 82°20′59″W
- Country: United States
- State: South Carolina
- County: Greenville
- Established: 1820

Area
  - Total: 1.07 sq mi (2.78 km^{2})
  - Land: 1.06 sq mi (2.75 km^{2})
  - Water: 0.012 sq mi (0.03 km^{2})
- Elevation: 879 ft (268 m)

Population (2020)
  - Total: 904
  - Density: 851.4/sq mi (328.73/km^{2})
- Time zone: UTC-5 (Eastern (EST))
  - Summer (DST): UTC-4 (EDT)
- ZIP code: 29636
- Area codes: 864, 821
- GNIS feature ID: 2812958

Conestee is an unincorporated community and census-designated place (CDP) in Greenville County, South Carolina, United States. It was first listed as a CDP in the 2020 census with a population of 904.

Conestee's main attraction is Lake Conestee Nature Park. The community is bordered by the city of Greenville to the north, Mauldin to the east and Gantt to the west.

Conestee Mill and McBee Methodist Church are listed on the National Register of Historic Places and located in Conestee.

== Demographics ==
Historical population
Census	Pop.	Note	%±
2020	904		—
U.S. Decennial Census; 2020

Conestee first appeared as a census designated place in the 2020 U.S. census.

=== 2020 census ===
Conestee CDP, South Carolina – Demographic Profile (NH = Non-Hispanic)
Race / Ethnicity	Pop 2020	% 2020
White alone (NH)	649	71.79%
Black or African American alone (NH)	107	11.84%
Native American or Alaska Native alone (NH)	2	0.22%
Asian alone (NH)	1	0.11%
Pacific Islander alone (NH)	0	0.00%
Some Other Race alone (NH)	5	0.55%
Mixed Race/Multi-Racial (NH)	31	3.43%
Hispanic or Latino (any race)	109	12.06%
Total	904	100.00%

Note: the US Census treats Hispanic/Latino as an ethnic category. This table excludes Latinos from the racial categories and assigns them to a separate category. Hispanics/Latinos can be of any race.
