= Cannon Building (Fountain Inn, South Carolina) =

- U.S. National Register of Historic Places
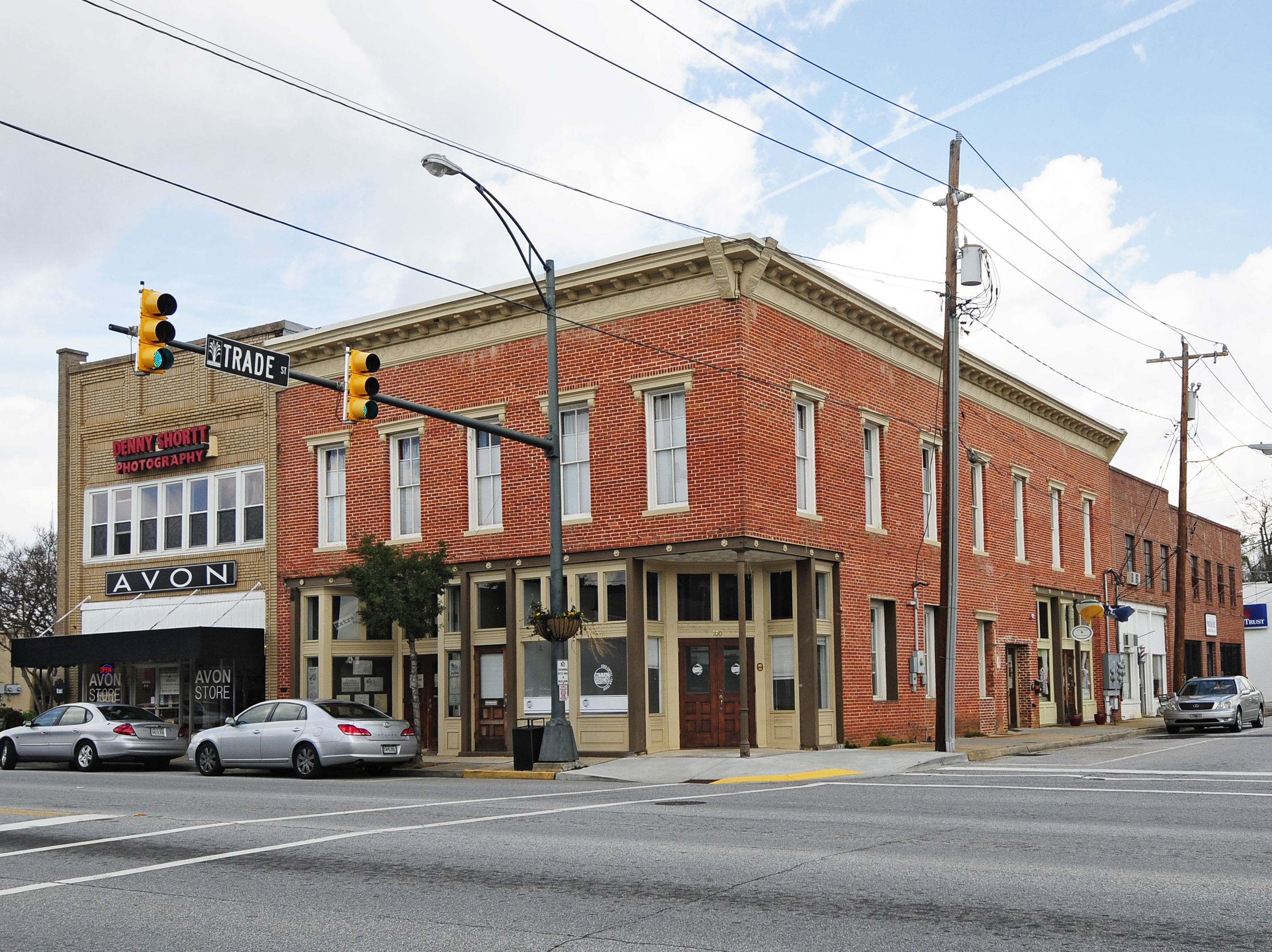
- Cannon Building

- Location within South Carolina Location within the United States
- Location: 100 N. Main St., Fountain Inn, South Carolina
- Coordinates: 34°41′37″N 82°11′59″W
- Area: less than one acre
- Built: 1880
- Architectural style: Late Victorian
- NRHP reference No.: 05001100
- Added to NRHP: September 28, 2005

Cannon Building in Fountain Inn, South Carolina is a building built in 1880. It was listed on the National Register of Historic Places in 2005.
