= South Carolina Highway 101 =

State highway in South Carolina

South Carolina Highway 101

Route information
- Maintained by SCDOT
- Length: 56.522 mi (90.963 km)
- Existed: 1927–present

Major junctions
- South end: US 76 in Hickory Tavern
- I-385 near Gray Court; US 221 in Woodruff; I-85 in Greer; US 29 in Greer
- North end: SC 11 near Gowensville

Location
- Country: United States
- State: South Carolina
- Counties: Laurens, Spartanburg, Greenville

Highway system
- South Carolina State Highway System; Interstate; US; State; Scenic
← SC 99	→ SC 102

South Carolina Highway 101 (SC 101) is a 56.522-mile (90.963 km) state highway in Laurens, Spartanburg, and Greenville counties in the U.S. state of South Carolina. Its southern terminus is at an intersection with U.S. Route 76 (US 76) in Hickory Tavern, and its northern terminus is at an intersection with SC 11 near Landrum.

== Route description ==
SC 101 begins in Hickory Tavern at US 76 and heads northwest. At the intersection of State Road S-30-20, the highway then turns to the northeast and heads toward Gray Court. It intersects SC 14 in downtown and then interchanges with I-385 at exit 16 while it continues northeast. The route then enters Woodruff and runs concurrently with US 221 and SC 146 for about 1 mile (1.6 km). Northwest of Woodruff, the highway then heads west, remaining concurrent with SC 146. It intersects with SC 418 as it exits town. Outside the city limits of Woodruff, SC 101 splits from SC 146 and heads northwest, intersecting SC 417 and SC 296.

Northwest of Reidville, the highway interchanges with I-85 at exit 60, forming a parclo interchange. Continuing into Greer, the highway passes Greenville-Spartanburg International Airport before intersecting SC 80. In Greer, the highway intersects with SC 357's southern terminus and becomes concurrent with SC 290 heading west. It then runs concurrently with US 29 for about 0.3 miles (0.48 km) and then continues northwest. After about a tenth of a mile, SC 101 tracks north, crossing over the South Tyger River before making its way through Highland, and running concurrent with SC 414 for a tenth of a mile before continuing northwest. The route reaches its northern terminus at SC 11 in northern Greenville County.

== Major intersections ==
County	Location	mi	km	Destinations	Notes
Laurens	Hickory Tavern	0.000	0.000	US 76 (Main Street) / Neely Ferry Road – Waterloo, Laurens, Princeton	Southern terminus
Laurens	Gray Court	10.140	16.319	SC 14 (Main Street) – Laurens, Fountain Inn, Greenville	
Laurens	Gray Court	10.270	16.528	SC 92 east (Knight Street) – Lanford, Enoree	Western terminus of SC 92
Laurens		11.692– 11.700	18.816– 18.829	I-385 – Columbia, Greenville	I-385 exit 16
Spartanburg	Woodruff	20.930	33.684	US 221 south / SC 146 east (South Main Street) / East Georgia Street	Southern end of US 221 and SC 146 concurrencies
Spartanburg	Woodruff	21.890	35.229	US 221 north (North Main Street) to I-26	Northern end of US 221 concurrency
Spartanburg		22.050	35.486	SC 418 west (Fountain Inn Road) / Carlton Duvall Drive – Fountain Inn	Eastern terminus of SC 418
Spartanburg		26.629	42.855	SC 146 west – Simpsonville, Greenville	Northern end of SC 146 concurrency
Spartanburg	Cashville	28.792	46.336	SC 417 – Fountain Inn, Simpsonville, Spartanburg	
Spartanburg	Greer	31.562	50.794	SC 296 (Reidville Road) – Bennetts Bridge, Mauldin, Spartanburg, Reidville	Unincorporated community of Pelham (aka Sugar Tit)
Spartanburg		34.722– 34.910	55.880– 56.182	I-85 – Spartanburg, Greenville	I-85 exit 60
Spartanburg	Greer	38.112	61.335	SC 80 (J. Verne Smith Parkway / SC 101 Truck north) – SC Inland Port Terminal	Southern terminus of SC 101 Truck
Spartanburg–Greenville county line	Greer	39.942	64.280	SC 290 east (East Poinsett Street) / SC 357 north (North Line Street) – Duncan, Apalache	Southern end of SC 290 concurrency
Greenville	Greer	40.262	64.795	SC 14 (Main Street / SC 101 Truck south)	Northern terminus of SC 101 Truck
Greenville	Greer	41.932	67.483	US 29 north / SC 290 Truck east (Wade Hampton Boulevard / SC 14 Truck north) / Mount Vernon Road – Spartanburg	Southern end of US 29/SC 14 Truck concurrency; northern terminus of SC 290 Truck
Greenville	Greer	42.182	67.885	US 29 south (Wade Hampton Boulevard) / SC 14 Truck south (Buncombe Street) – Greenville	Northern end of US 29/SC 14 Truck concurrency
Greenville	Fairview	42.692	68.706	SC 290 west (Locust Hill Road)	Northern end of SC 290 concurrency
Greenville	Highland	53.802	86.586	SC 414 east / Glassy Road – Gowensville	Southern end of SC 414 concurrency
Greenville	Highland	53.922	86.779	SC 414 west – Tigerville, North Greenville University	Northern end of SC 414 concurrency
Greenville		56.522	90.963	SC 11 / S-23-912 – Cleveland, Gowensville	
1.000 mi = 1.609 km; 1.000 km = 0.621 mi: Concurrency terminus

== Greer truck route ==
South Carolina Highway 101 Truck
- Location: Greer
- Length: 5.610 mi (9.028 km)

South Carolina Highway 101 Truck (SC 101 Truck) is a 5.610-mile (9.028 km) truck route that is partially within the city limits of Greer. It has concurrencies with SC 80 and SC 14.

The truck route begins at an intersection with the SC 101 mainline at that highway's intersection with SC 80 (J. Verne Smith Parkway) in the southern part of Greer, which is in the southwestern part of Spartanburg County. This intersection is just north of the Greenville–Spartanburg International Airport. SC 80 and SC 101 Truck travel to the southwest, skirting along the southern edges of the city. They travel through rural portions of the city, just to the west of the airport. Just past an intersection with the southern terminus of Poplar Street Extension, they enter the east-central part of Greenville County. Just before an intersection with the southern terminus of Old Highway 14 South (a former portion of SC 14), they curve to the west and leave the airport area. After a slight bend to the west-southwest, they intersect SC 14 and the eastern terminus of Tandem Drive. Here, SC 80 reaches its western terminus, and SC 101 Truck turns right to follow SC 14 north to the north-northwest. Immediately, they temporarily leave the city limits of Greer. They curve to the northeast and begin a curve back to the north-northwest. At an intersection with the southern terminus of SC 14 Truck (South Buncombe Road), they re-enter the city. This intersection leads to Greenville Technical College's Benson Campus, North Greenville University, and Prisma Health Greer Memorial Hospital. They curve to the northeast and intersect the eastern terminus of West Road and the western terminus of Roscoe Road, where they leave the city limits again. A short distance later, they re-enter the city for the final time. At an intersection with Donaldson Avenue, they begin a curve to the north-northwest. After a slight bend to the north-northeast, they travel on a bridge over some railroad tracks of Norfolk Southern Railway. Then, they cross over some railroad tracks of CSX. Just past the northern terminus of School Street, they pass the Greer Heritage Museum. At Poinsett Street, they intersect SC 101/SC 290. Here, SC 101 Truck ends, and SC 14 continues to the northeast.

The entire route is in Greer.

County	mi	km	Destinations	Notes
Spartanburg	0.000	0.000	SC 80 east (J. Verne Smith Parkway) / SC 101 (New Woodruff Road) – Greer, SC Inland Port Terminal	Southern end of SC 80 concurrency; southern terminus
Greenville	1.770	2.849	Old Highway 14 South north	Southern terminus of Old Highway 14 South; former SC 14 north
Greenville	2.120	3.412	SC 14 south / Tandem Drive west – Simpsonville	Northern end of SC 80 concurrency; southern end of SC 14 concurrency; eastern terminus of Tandem Drive
Greenville	3.580	5.761	South Buncombe Road (SC 14 Truck north) – Greenville Tech Benson Campus, North Greenville University	Southern terminus of SC 14 Truck; provides access to Prisma Health Greer Memorial Hospital
Greenville	5.610	9.028	SC 101 / SC 290 (Poinsett Street) / SC 14 north (North Main Street) – City stadium, Chamber of commerce	Northern end of SC 14 concurrency; northern terminus
1.000 mi = 1.609 km; 1.000 km = 0.621 mi: Concurrency terminus
