= Interstate 85 in South Carolina =

Interstate in South Carolina

Interstate 85
- I-85 highlighted in red

Route information
- Maintained by SCDOT
- Length: 106.28 mi (171.04 km)
- Existed: 1959–present
- NHS: Entire route

Major junctions
- South end: I-85 at the Georgia state line near Lavonia, GA
- US 76 / SC 28 north of Anderson; US 178 north of Anderson; US 29 (multiple times in the state); I-185 near Greenville; US 25 in Greenville; US 276 in Greenville; I-385 in Greenville; I-26 near Spartanburg; US 176 near Spartanburg; US 221 near Cherokee Springs
- North end: I-85 at the North Carolina state line in Grover, NC

Location
- Country: United States
- State: South Carolina
- Counties: Oconee, Anderson, Greenville, Spartanburg, Cherokee

Highway system
- Interstate Highway System; Main; Auxiliary; Suffixed; Business; Future; South Carolina State Highway System; Interstate; US; State; Scenic
← SC 83	→ SC 86

Interstate 85 (I-85) in the U.S. state of South Carolina runs northeast–southwest through Upstate South Carolina. Connecting regionally with Atlanta, Georgia, and Charlotte, North Carolina, it became the first Interstate Highway in South Carolina to have its originally planned mileage completed.

== Route description ==
=== Georgia state line to Greenville ===
I-85 enters South Carolina along the Vandiver Bridge from Georgia, crossing over Tugaloo River/Lake Hartwell. It is immediately followed by exit 1, where the welcome center and the start of South Carolina Highway 11 (SC 11; Cherokee Foothills Scenic Highway) are located. For the next 19 miles (31 km), I-85 continues along the north shores of Lake Hartwell, crossing over some parts of it. At the U.S. Highway 76 (US 76)/SC 28 interchange (exit 19), the highway widens to six lanes. Continuing northeast, US 29 joins I-85 (exit 34), near Piedmont, as they run concurrently until after they cross the Saluda River.

=== Greenville to Spartanburg ===
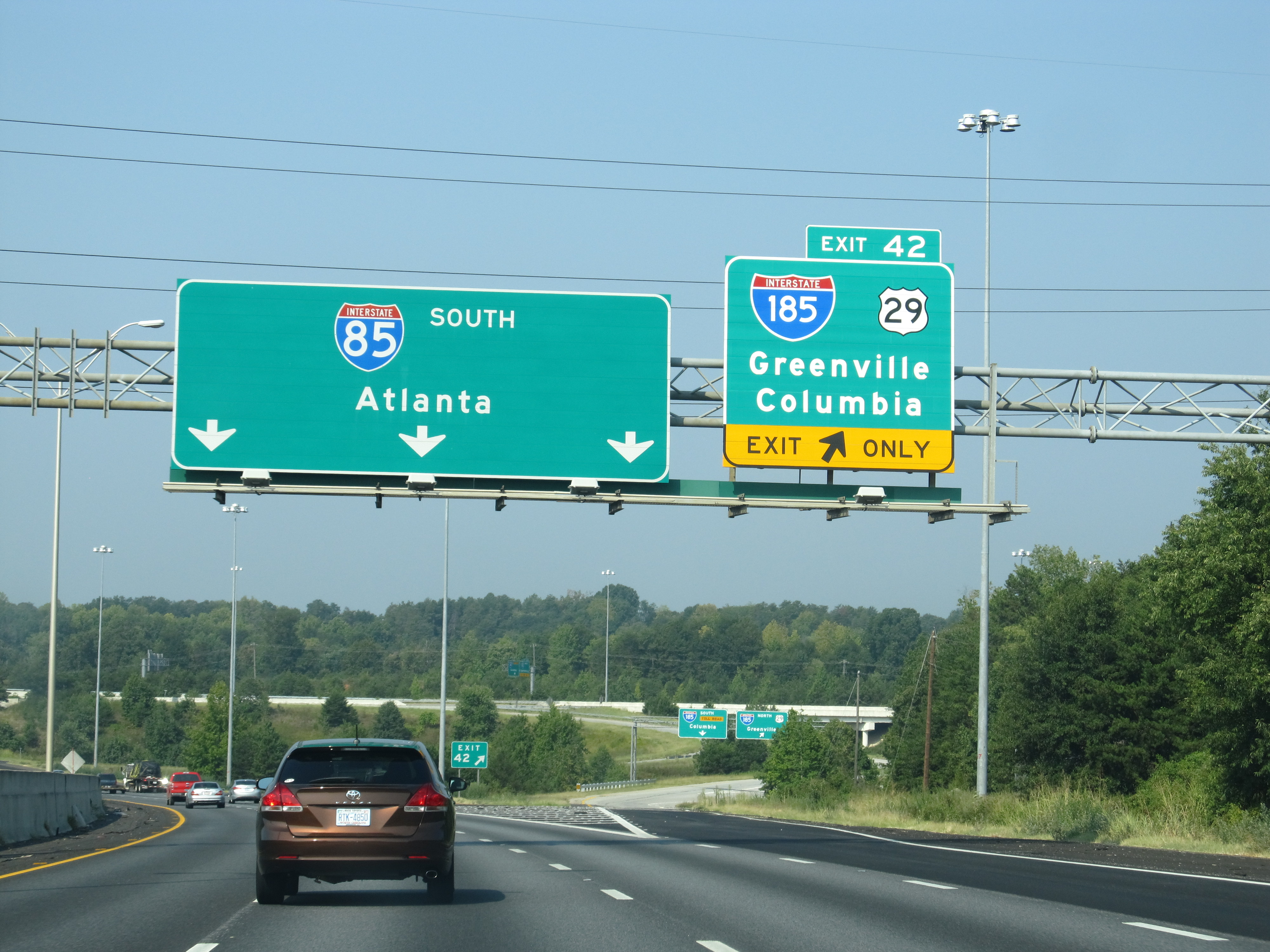
I-85 southbound at interchange with I-185/US 29 in Greenville

I-85 bypasses Greenville to the south but provides a link into the city via auxiliary routes I-185 and I-385. US 29 splits from I-85 and joins I-185 toward downtown Greenville.

Two key upstate businesses can be seen from this portion of the Interstate. One is Michelin's North American headquarters (exit 54) and the other is the BMW plant, located in Greer (exit 60). I-85 also passes Greenville–Spartanburg International Airport (exit 57), which serves the Greenville–Spartanburg–Anderson metropolitan area.

=== Spartanburg to North Carolina state line ===
Near Spartanburg, I-85 takes a northern bypass of the city with a higher speed limit of 70 mph (110 km/h), while an older alignment designated as I-85 Business (I-85 Bus.) freeway loop continues along a more direct path at a lower speed limit of 55 mph (89 km/h). Along the bypass routing, I-85 connects with I-26 (exit 70) and indirectly connects with I-585, via US 176 (exit 72).

Northeast of exit 80, I-85 dips below a 22-foot-5-inch-high (6.83 m) railroad bridge originally used by the Clinchfield Railroad (now CSX Transportation's Blue Ridge Subdivision), which also contains a provision for a frontage road along the southbound lane named Dewberry Road. At milemarker 91 in Gaffney, travelers will not be able to miss the Peachoid, a large water tower with its top shaped like a peach, representing one of the state's most important crops. At milemarker 95, an old plantation cemetery is located on a knoll in the median of I-85 (more visible to see on southbound lanes). A 20-foot-6-inch-high (6.25 m) rail-trail bridge can be found in the vicinity of Blacksburg between exits 100 and 102. At milemarker 103 is the southbound welcome center. I-85 enters North Carolina 3.4 miles (5.5 km) later, after the diamond junction with US 29.

=== Services ===
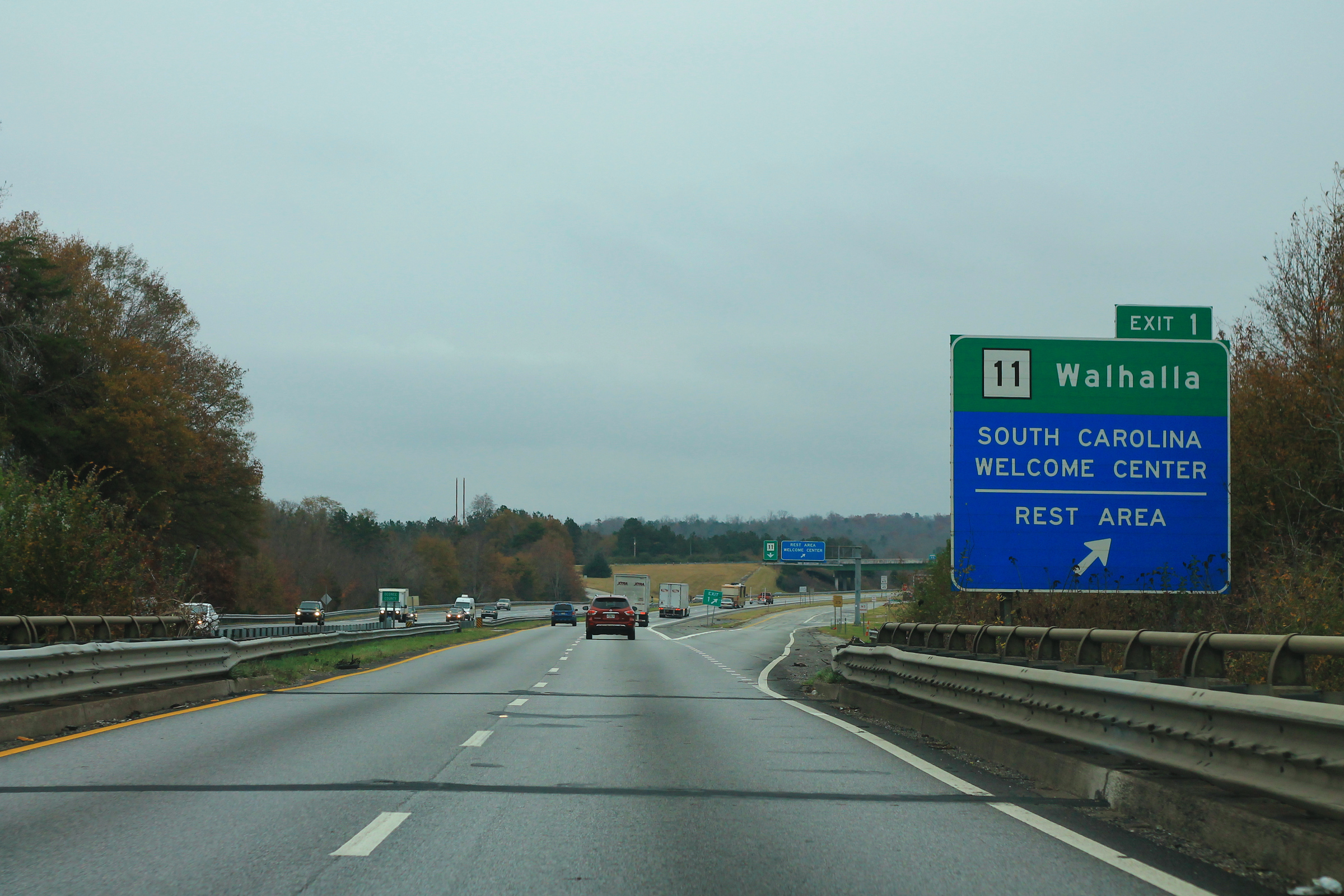
The Oconee County Welcome Center is shared with the frontage road at northbound exit 1.

The South Carolina Department of Transportation (SCDOT) operates and maintains two welcome centers and five rest areas along I-85. Welcome centers, which have a travel information facility on site, are located at the collector–distributor road for exit 1 (northbound) and around milemarker 103 (southbound); rest areas are located at milemarkers 17 (northbound) and 24 (southbound). Common at all locations are public restrooms, public telephones, vending machines, picnic area, and barbecue grills.

The South Carolina Department of Public Safety (SCDPS) and State Transport Police (STP) operate and maintain one truck inspection/weigh station, located northbound at milemarker 9 in Fair Play. The location utilizes weigh-in-motion that does not require commercial motor vehicles to leave the freeway to be weighed.

== History ==
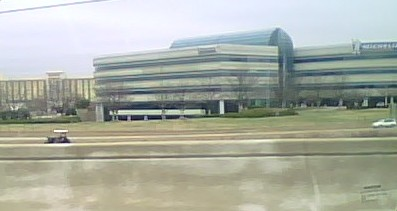
Michelin North American headquarters near Greenville at exit 54 in 2008

Established in 1959, I-85 originally ran along the newly widened four-lane section of US 29, from Fort Prince Boulevard (SC 129, exit 68) to the North Carolina state line. Construction also started around that time extending I-85 from Fort Prince Boulevard to I-185, south of Greenville. In 1961, construction started on another section, from the Georgia state line to US 29, near Piedmont. In 1962, US 29 was removed from the entire existing section of I-85 at that time.

By 1964, I-85 was extended south from Fort Prince Boulevard to I-185/US 29. Also, smaller sections were open: from the Georgia state line to Road 23 (exit 4) and from SC 24/SC 243 (exit 11) to US 178 (exit 21). By 1967, I-85 was completed in the state. It was South Carolina's first Interstate Highway fully completed.

In 1995, I-85 was moved onto a new six-lane freeway north of its existing route near Spartanburg, from milemarkers 69–77. The old alignment became the I-85 Bus. freeway loop. In 1998, exit 46B was added, connecting to Pleasantburg Drive (SC 291).

Being a four-lane freeway since inception, the first widening to six lanes (excluding the new freeway near Spartanburg) was completed in 1998, from US 276 to I-385. By end of 2003, I-85 was widened to six lanes from US 76/SC 28 (exit 19) north to US 221 (exit 78).

The last original 27-mile (43 km) segment between milemarker 79 and the North Carolina state line is in the process of being widened to six lanes, which includes the reconstruction of many interchanges.

As part of this widening project, the previously low 15-foot-high (4.6 m) railroad bridge originally used by the Clinchfield Railroad east of exit 80, was replaced by a 22-foot-5-inch-high (6.83 m) bridge, which also contains provisions for Dewberry Road. The former 23-foot-6-inch-high (7.16 m) decrepit railroad bridge in the vicinity of Blacksburg between exits 100 and 102 was replaced by a slightly lower bridge for a future rail-trail.

== Exit list ==
County	Location	mi	km	Exit	Destinations	Notes
Tugaloo River / Lake Hartwell		0.00	0.00		I-85 south (SR 403) – Atlanta	Georgia state line
Tugaloo River / Lake Hartwell		0.00	0.00	S. Earnest Vandiver Bridge; Georgia–South Carolina state line		
Oconee		0.19	0.31	1	SC 11 north (Cherokee Foothills Scenic Highway) – Walhalla	Northbound exit includes South Carolina Welcome Center; southern terminus of SC 11
Oconee	Fair Play	2.29	3.69	2	SC 59 north – Fair Play, Seneca	
Anderson	Fair Play	4.03	6.49	4	To SC 243 / Road 23 – Fair Play	
Anderson		11.17	17.98	11	SC 24 / SC 243 west – Anderson, Townville	Eastern terminus of SC 243
Anderson		13.66	21.98	14	SC 187 – Pendleton, Clemson	
Anderson		19.42	31.25	19	US 76 / SC 28 – Clemson, Anderson	Signed as exits 19A (east) and 19B (west)
Anderson		20.64	33.22	21	US 178 – Anderson, Liberty	
Anderson		27.14	43.68	27	SC 81 – Anderson	
Anderson		31.78	51.14	32	SC 8 – Pelzer, Belton	
Anderson		34.17	54.99	34	US 29 south – Williamston, Anderson	South end of US 29 overlap; Southbound exit and northbound entrance
Anderson	Piedmont	35.20	56.65	35	SC 86 – Piedmont, Easley	
Anderson	Powdersville	38.93	62.65	39	River Road – Piedmont	
Anderson	Powdersville	40.19	64.68	40	SC 153 – Easley	
Greenville		41.88	67.40	42	I-185 / US 29 north – Greenville, Columbia	North end of US 29 overlap; south I-185 toll road
Greenville	Greenville	42.75	68.80	44A	SC 20 (Piedmont Highway)	Southbound exit and northbound entrance
Greenville	Greenville	43.21	69.54	44B	US 25 (White Horse Road)	
Greenville	Greenville	45.33	72.95	46A	Augusta Road	
Greenville	Greenville	45.53	73.27	46B	SC 291 (Pleasantburg Drive)	
Greenville	Greenville	46.01	74.05	46C	Mauldin Road	
Greenville	Greenville	48.17	77.52	48	US 276 – Mauldin, Greenville	Signed as exits 48A (east) and 48B (west)
Greenville	Greenville	50.37	81.06	51A	SC 146 (Woodruff Road)	
Greenville	Greenville	50.80	81.75	51	I-385 – Columbia, Greenville	Signed as exits 51B (south) and 51C (north)
Greenville		53.68	86.39	54	Pelham Road	
Spartanburg	Greer	55.96	90.06	56	SC 14 – Greer, Pelham	Southbound exit combined with exit 57
Spartanburg	Greer	56.83	91.46	57	Aviation Drive – GSP International Airport	
Spartanburg	Greer	57.24	92.12	58	Brockman McClimon Road	
Spartanburg	Greer	59.92	96.43	60	SC 101 – Woodruff, Greer	
Spartanburg		63.32	101.90	63	SC 290 – Moore, Duncan	
Spartanburg		65.89	106.04	66	US 29 – Spartanburg, Wellford, Lyman	
Spartanburg		67.89	109.26	68	SC 129 north – Wellford, Greer	Wellford signed northbound, Greer signed southbound
Spartanburg		68.71	110.58	69	I-85 BL north – Spartanburg	Northbound exit and southbound entrance
Spartanburg		70.62	113.65	70	I-26 – Columbia, Asheville	
Spartanburg		72.48	116.65	72	US 176 to I-585 – Spartanburg, Inman	
Spartanburg	Boiling Springs	74.87	120.49	75	SC 9 – Spartanburg, Boiling Springs	
Spartanburg		77.35	124.48	77	I-85 BL south – Spartanburg	
Spartanburg		78.46	126.27	78	US 221 – Chesnee, Spartanburg	
Spartanburg		79.80	128.43	80	Road 57, Gossett Road	
Spartanburg		82.11	132.14	82	Bud Arthur Bridge Road	Permanently closed as of 2021, was northbound exit only
Spartanburg		83.38	134.19	83	SC 110 – Cowpens, Chesnee	
Cherokee		86.58	139.34	87	Road 39, Green River Road	
Cherokee	Gaffney	89.76	144.45	90	SC 105 south – Gaffney	
Cherokee	Gaffney	92.18	148.35	92	SC 11 (Cherokee Foothills Scenic Highway) to SC 150 – Gaffney, Chesnee	
Cherokee	Gaffney	94.75	152.49	95	SC 18 to SC 150 / Pleasant School Road – Gaffney, Boiling Springs	
Cherokee		96.10	154.66	96	SC 18 – Shelby	
Cherokee		98.04	157.78	98	Frontage Road	Permanently closed as of 2020, was northbound exit only
Cherokee		99.33	159.86	100	Blacksburg Highway	
Cherokee	Blacksburg	101.97	164.10	102	SC 5 south / SC 198 east – Blacksburg, Rock Hill	Northern terminus of SC 5; western terminus of SC 198
Cherokee		103.95	167.29	104	Road 99, Tribal Road	
Cherokee		105.67	170.06	106	US 29 – Blacksburg, Grover	
Cherokee		106.28	171.04		I-85 north – Charlotte	North Carolina state line
1.000 mi = 1.609 km; 1.000 km = 0.621 mi: Concurrency terminus; Incomplete access

== Related routes ==
I-85 in South Carolina has three auxiliary routes and one business route. I-185 enters Greenville from the southwest and runs between I-85 and I-385 as a toll road. I-385 enters Greenville from the east and connects I-85 with I-26 toward Columbia. I-585 enters Spartanburg from the northwest between I-85 and US 221 and becomes North Pine Street; it does not connect with I-85 as of 2022. I-85 Bus. in Spartanburg is freeway grade throughout its length.

== See also ==
Interstate 85
Previous state: Georgia	South Carolina	Next state: North Carolina
