= South Carolina Highway 14 =

State highway in South Carolina

South Carolina Highway 14

Route information
- Maintained by SCDOT
- Length: 59.240 mi (95.338 km)
- Existed: 1942–present

Major junctions
- East end: US 76 Bus. in Laurens
- US 76 in Laurens; I-385 in Fountain Inn; I-85 in Greer; US 29 in Greer; US 176 in Landrum
- West end: I-26 in Landrum

Location
- Country: United States
- State: South Carolina
- Counties: Laurens, Greenville, Spartanburg

Highway system
- South Carolina State Highway System; Interstate; US; State; Scenic
← SC 12	→ US 15

South Carolina Highway 14 (SC 14) is a state highway in the U.S. state of South Carolina. The state highway runs 59.24 miles (95.34 km) from U.S. Route 76 Business (US 76 Bus.) in Laurens north to Interstate 26 (I-26) in Landrum. SC 14 connects Laurens and Landrum with Greer, the city between Greenville and Spartanburg where the highway crosses I-85 and US 29. The highway also parallels I-385 through Fountain Inn and Simpsonville, South Carolina in southeastern Greenville County. SC 14 is a part of the National Highway System between I-85 and US 29 in Greer.

== Route description ==
SC 14 begins at an intersection with US 76 Business (Main Street) in the city of Laurens. The state highway heads north through the Laurens Historic District as Church Street, which starts as two lanes but expands to four lanes as it approaches US 76 (Hillcrest Drive). The two highways run concurrently for a short distance before US 76 splits west onto Anderson Drive. SC 14 reduces to two lanes shortly before it exits the city limits. The state highway heads northwest parallel to CSX's Spartanburg Subdivision. The highway passes by several stretches of Old Laurens Road and passes through the hamlet of Barksdale before reaching the town of Gray Court, where the highway intersects SC 101 (Mill Street). North of town near the hamlet of Owings, SC 14 has a trumpet interchange with I-385. The state highway runs concurrently with the four-lane freeway to a modified diamond interchange at the southern edge of Fountain Inn. SC 14 parallels the railroad into town as Laurens Road and then becomes Main Street at the Laurens–Greenville county line. The highway intersects SC 418 (McCarter Road) and passes the historic Cannon Building.

SC 14 leaves Fountain Inn and continues to parallel the railroad as the Main Street of Simpsonville. In the center of town next to the historic Burdette Building and 101 East Curtis Street, the highway intersects Curtis Street, which heads east as SC 417. The highways run concurrently to the northern edge of town, where SC 417 continues straight on Main Street toward interchanges with I-385 and Interstate 185 in Mauldin while SC 14 turns northeast. The highway crosses Gilder Creek and passes through the unincorporated Greenville suburb of Five Forks, where the highway gains a center turn lane, meets the western end of SC 296 (Five Forks Road), and intersects SC 146 (Woodruff Road). Between the hamlets of Batesville and Pelham, SC 14 crosses the Enoree River and enters Spartanburg County, where the road expands to four lanes plus a center turn lane. The road temporarily becomes a divided highway through its single-point urban interchange with I-85 just west of the Interstate's interchange Aviation Drive, the main access road to Greenville-Spartanburg International Airport. Just north of I-85, SC 14 returns to Greenville County and becomes a six-lane highway with a center turn lane that passes along the western edge of the airport property. The state highway meets the western end of SC 80 (J. Verne Smith Parkway) on the southern edge of the city of Greer, through which the highway follows Main Street, which reduces to four lanes at Old Buncombe Road.

SC 14 enters the downtown area of Greer and drops to two lanes after crossing over Norfolk Southern Railway's Greenville District and meeting CSX's Spartanburg Subdivision at grade. At the center of downtown, the state highway intersects Poinsett Street, which carries SC 101 and SC 290. SC 14 continues as a four-lane road to its junction with US 29 (Wade Hampton Boulevard), where the highway becomes two lanes again. On the northern edge of Greer, the highway crosses Frohawk Creek and the South Tyger River just downstream from the dam that impounds Cunningham Lake. SC 14 leaves the suburban area around Greenville and meets the eastern end of SC 414 just south of its bridge over the North Tyger River. The highway intersects SC 11 (Cherokee Foothills Scenic Highway) at Gowensville before curving northeast, crossing the Pacolet River, and re-entering Spartanburg County. SC 14's name becomes Rutherford Street as it passes through the town of Landrum, where it intersects US 176 (Howard Avenue) and Norfolk Southern's W Line. On the eastern edge of town, the state highway reaches its northern terminus at a diamond interchange with I-26. Landrum Road continues northeast as a state secondary highway to the North Carolina state line near the mountains.

== Major intersections ==
County	Location	mi	km	Destinations	Notes
Laurens	Laurens	0.000	0.000	US 76 Bus. (Main Street)	Southern terminus
Laurens	Laurens	0.600	0.966	US 76 east (Hillcrest Drive) to US 221 – Clinton, Greenwood	South end of US 76 concurrency
Laurens	Laurens	0.800	1.287	US 76 west (Anderson Drive) – Anderson	North end of US 76 concurrency
Laurens	Gray Court	9.520	15.321	SC 101 (Mill Street) to SC 92 – Woodruff	
Laurens		12.715– 12.810	20.463– 20.616	I-385 south – Columbia	Southern end of I-385 concurrency; I-385 exit 19
Laurens	Fountain Inn	15.490– 15.510	24.929– 24.961	I-385 north – Greenville	Northern end of I-385 concurrency; I-385 exit 22
Greenville	Fountain Inn	17.180	27.649	SC 418 (McCarter Road) – Woodruff, Pelzer	
Greenville	Simpsonville	22.430	36.098	SC 417 east (Curtis Street) – Woodruff	Southern end of SC 417 concurrency
Greenville	Simpsonville	23.920	38.496	SC 417 west (Main Street) – Mauldin	Northern end of SC 417 concurrency
Greenville	Five Forks	27.010	43.468	SC 296 east (Five Forks Road) – Reidville	Western terminus of SC 296
Greenville	Five Forks	28.770	46.301	SC 146 (Woodruff Road) – Greenville, Woodruff	
Spartanburg	No major junctions				
Spartanburg–Greenville county line	Greer	33.410	53.768	I-85 – Greenville, Spartanburg, Greenville-Spartanburg International Airport	I-85 exit 56; single-point urban interchange
Greenville	Greer	35.030	56.375	SC 80 east (J. Verne Smith Parkway / SC 101 Truck south) / Tandem Drive west	Southern end of SC 101 Truck concurrency; western terminus of SC 80; eastern terminus of Tandem Drive
Greenville	Greer	36.490	58.725	South Buncombe Road (SC 14 Truck north) – Greenville Tech Benson Campus, North Greenville University	Southern terminus of SC 14 Truck; provides access to Prisma Health Greer Memorial Hospital
Greenville	Greer	38.520	61.992	SC 101 / SC 290 (Poinsett Street) – Duncan	Northern end of SC 101 Truck concurrency; northern terminus of SC 101 Truck
Greenville	Greer	39.220	63.118	US 29 / SC 290 Truck (Wade Hampton Boulevard / SC 14 Truck south) – Spartanburg, Greenville	Northern terminus of SC 14 Truck
Greenville	Gowensville	50.320	80.982	SC 414 west – Tigerville	Eastern terminus of SC 414
Greenville	Gowensville	52.430	84.378	SC 11 (Cherokee Foothills Scenic Highway) – Campobello, Cleveland	
Spartanburg	Landrum	57.240	92.119	US 176 (Howard Avenue) – Campobello, Tryon	
Spartanburg	Landrum	59.240	95.338	I-26 / Landrum Road north – Spartanburg, Asheville	Northern terminus; I-26 exit 1; roadway continues as Landrum Road.
1.000 mi = 1.609 km; 1.000 km = 0.621 mi: Concurrency terminus

== Greer truck route ==
South Carolina Highway 14 Truck
- Location: Greer
- Length: 4.610 mi (7.419 km)

South Carolina Highway 14 Truck (SC 14 Truck) is a 4.610-mile (7.419 km) truck route that is nearly entirely within the western part of Greer, in the east-central part of Greenville County. Part of its path is concurrent with U.S. Route 29 (US 29), SC 101, and SC 290 Truck.

The truck route begins at an intersection with the SC 14 mainline in the central part of the city. It takes South Buncombe Road to the northwest. The highway begins to curve to the north-northwest and passes Prisma Health Greer Memorial Hospital. It curves back to the northwest and travels on a bridge over some railroad tracks of Norfolk Southern Railway. It bends slightly more to the north and temporarily leaves the city limits of Greer. At a bridge over some railroad tracks of CSX, it re-enters the city. A short distance later, it intersects US 29 (Wade Hampton Boulevard). At this intersection, SC 101/SC 290, on North Buncombe Road, come in from the north-northwest. The four highways travel concurrently to the east-northeast.

A short distance later, they meet the southern terminus of Mt. Vernon Road. Here, SC 101/SC 290 splits off to the south-southeast, onto West Poinsett Street, while US 29/SC 14 Truck continue to the east-northeast, concurrent with SC 290 Truck, which begins at this intersection. Just before an intersection with the southern terminus of Ashmore Street, the roadway begins to curve to the east-southeast. Then, they intersect SC 14 (North Main Street). Here, SC 14 Truck reaches its northern terminus, while US 29 and SC 290 Truck continue to the east-southeast.

The entire route is in Greer, Greenville County.

mi	km	Destinations	Notes
0.000	0.000	South Buncombe Road south (SC 14) to I-85 / SC 80 – GSP Int'l. Airport	Southern terminus; South Buncombe Road continues past terminus.
2.590	4.168	US 29 south (Wade Hampton Boulevard) / SC 101 north / SC 290 west (North Buncombe Road) – North Greenville University	Southern end of US 29 and SC 101/SC 290 concurrencies
2.840	4.571	SC 101 south / SC 290 east (West Poinsett Street) / Mt. Vernon Road north – Greer	Northern end of SC 101/SC 290 concurrency; southern terminus of Mt. Vernon Road
4.610	7.419	SC 14 (North Main Street) / US 29 north / SC 290 Truck east (Wade Hampton Boulevard) – Landrum, Spartanburg	Eastern end of US 29 and SC 290 Truck concurrencies; northern terminus
1.000 mi = 1.609 km; 1.000 km = 0.621 mi: Concurrency terminus
