= South Carolina Highway 80 =

State highway in South Carolina

South Carolina Highway 80
- J. Verne Smith Parkway

Route information
- Maintained by SCDOT
- Length: 5.620 mi (9.045 km)
- Existed: 2002–present

Major junctions
- West end: SC 14 / SC 101 Truck in Greer
- SC 101 / SC 101 Truck in Greer; SC 290 / SC 290 Truck in Greer
- East end: US 29 / SC 290 Truck in Greer

Location
- Country: United States
- State: South Carolina
- Counties: Greenville, Spartanburg

Highway system
- South Carolina State Highway System; Interstate; US; State; Scenic
← SC 79	→ SC 81

South Carolina Highway 80 (SC 80) is a 5.620-mile (9.045 km) primary state highway in the state of South Carolina. The highway serves as a bypass, connecting SC 14 to U.S. Route 29 (US 29) in Greer.

== Route description ==
SC 80 is a four-lane expressway, which begins at SC 14, on the backside of the Greenville-Spartanburg International Airport. Going in a northeasterly direction, the first 0.8 miles (1.3 km) include a narrow median before splitting into a divided highway. Top speed limit along the highway is 55 miles per hour (89 km/h) with several at-grade intersections and one grade-separated intersection. The highway ends at US 29 (Wade Hampton Boulevard). The highway is shared with truck routes of SC 101 and SC 290.

== History ==
The second incarnation of SC 80 was established in July 2002 as a new primary route running from SC 101 to US 29. In April 2005 it was extended to SC 14.

The first SC 80 existed from 1937 to 1962 as a new primary route from SC 181 in Fair Play to SC 18 in Anderson. It was decommissioned after Lake Hartwell formed a gap in the highway with the westernmost part becoming part of SC 243 and the rest becoming Old Dobbins Bridge Road (S-4-22 and S-4-23).

== Major intersections ==
The entire route is in Greer.

County	mi	km	Destinations	Notes
Greenville	0.000	0.000	SC 14 / SC 101 Truck north / Tandem Drive west – Greer, Simpsonville	Western end of SC 101 Truck concurrency; western terminus of SC 80; eastern terminus of Tandem Drive
Spartanburg	2.120	3.412	SC 101 (New Woodruff Road) – Greer, Woodruff	Eastern end of SC 101 Truck concurrency; southern terminus of SC 101 Truck
Spartanburg	4.154– 4.170	6.685– 6.711	SC 290 (Poinseet Street) / SC 290 Truck begins – Greer, Duncan	Western end of SC 290 Truck concurrency; eastern terminus of SC 290 Truck; interchange
Spartanburg	5.620	9.045	US 29 / SC 290 Truck west (Wade Hampton Boulevard) / Gary Armstrong Road north – Greer, Lyman	Eastern end of SC 290 Truck concurrency; eastern terminus of SC 80; southern terminus of Gary Armstrong Road
1.000 mi = 1.609 km; 1.000 km = 0.621 mi: Concurrency terminus
