= Greenville Highway =

The Greenville Highway is the local road name used for the following highways

- U.S. Route 29 in South Carolina in Greenville, South Carolina
- U.S. Route 276 in North Carolina in Cedar Mountain, North Carolina.
