= Interstate 385 =

Interstate Highway in South Carolina

Interstate 385
- I-385 highlighted in red

Route information
- Auxiliary route of I-85
- Maintained by SCDOT
- Length: 42.16 mi (67.85 km)
- Existed: 1962–present
- NHS: Entire route

Major junctions
- South end: I-26 near Clinton
- I-185 Toll near Mauldin; I-85 near Greenville
- North end: I-385 BS / US 276 in Downtown Greenville

Location
- Country: United States
- State: South Carolina
- Counties: Laurens, Greenville

Highway system
- Interstate Highway System; Main; Auxiliary; Suffixed; Business; Future; South Carolina State Highway System; Interstate; US; State; Scenic
← SC 381	→ SC 385

Interstate 385 (I-385) is an auxiliary Interstate Highway located in the Upstate region of South Carolina. A spur route of I-85, the highway provides a freeway connection from Greenville to Columbia and Charleston via I-26. Around Greenville, the last several miles of I-385 forms the northeastern quadrant of a partial beltway around Greenville's southern suburbs along with I-185.

== Route description ==
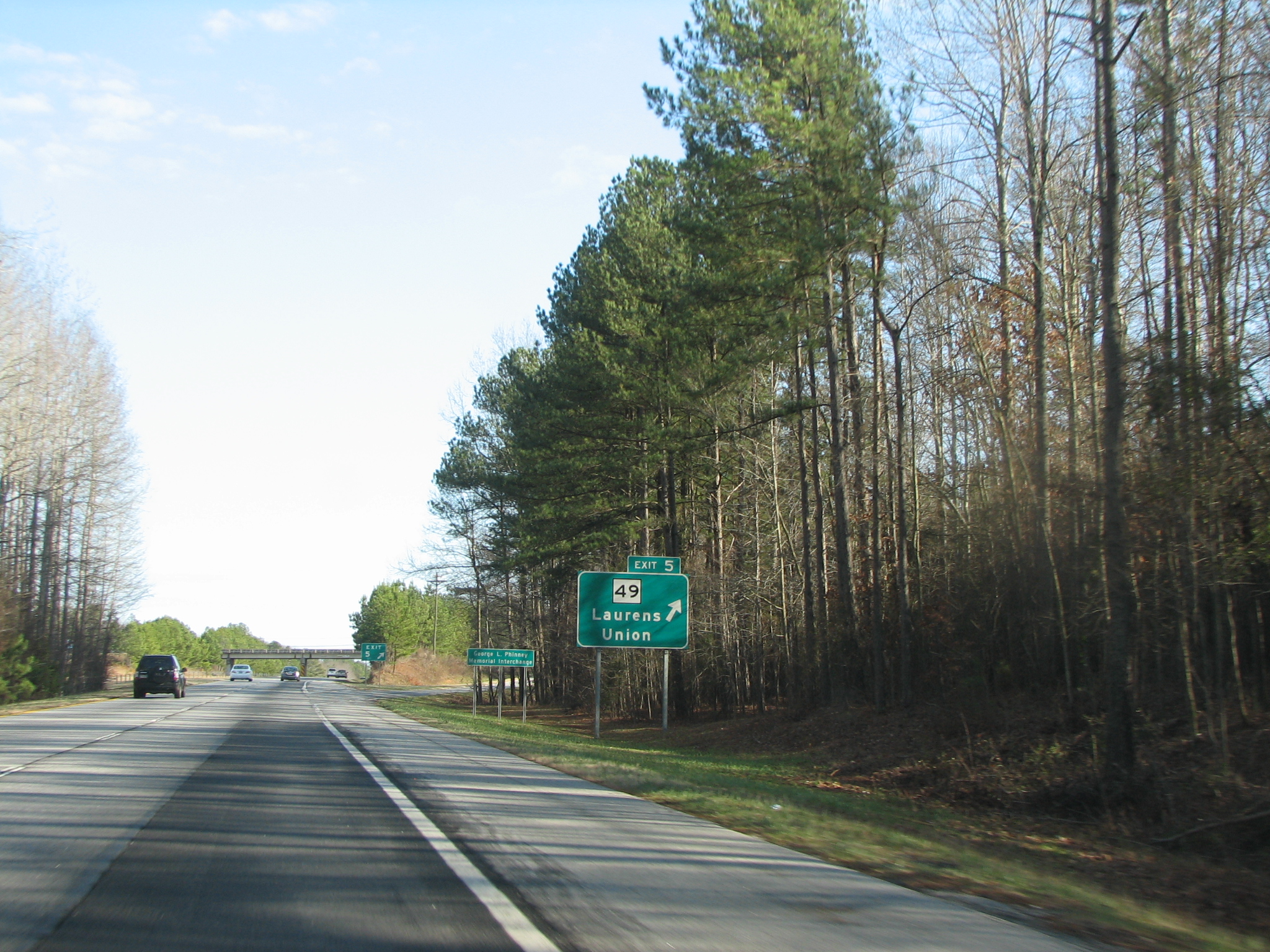
SC 49 exit on I-385, four miles (6.4 km) before the road ends at I-26

After exit 42, I-385 turns into unsigned I-385 Business (I-385 Bus.) and becomes East North Street and later—for northbound motorists only—Beattie Place. The business route promptly ends at US Highway 29 (US 29; Church Street) near Bon Secours Wellness Arena in downtown Greenville.

The explosive economic growth of southern Greenville county is largely attributed to I-385 and its connection to the city of Greenville and the major cities of Atlanta and Charlotte (via I-85). This area is known by locals as the "Golden Strip".

I-385 features a rather unusual rest area in the median strip near Laurens that serves both directions of traffic. It was completed as part of the original design of the US 276 expressway in 1958, modeled after the type of single median-located rest areas shared by both north and southbound traffic (to save money). The design is similar to many of those built on turnpikes that predated the Interstate System.

== History ==
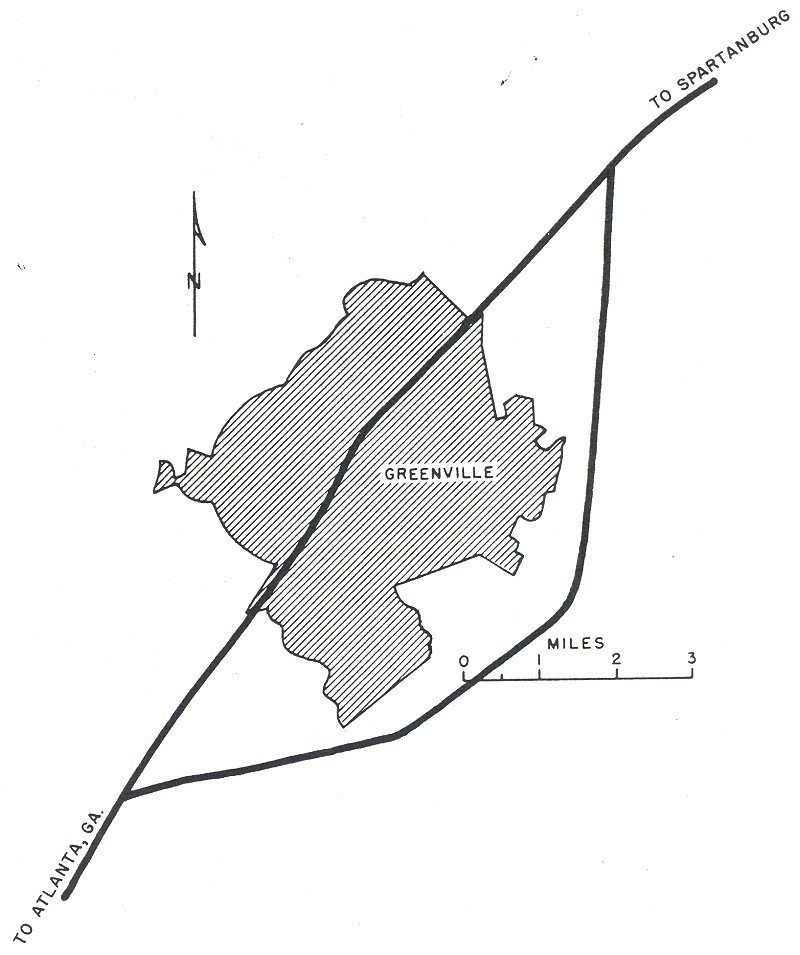
1955 "Yellow Book" map of Greenville

The general idea—but none of the specifics—of I-385 were present on the 1955 Yellow Book map of the Greenville area. Also of note is that I-85 would have used the US 29 corridor from Greenville east toward Spartanburg based on the diagram.

The portion of I-385 that replaced US 276 (from South Carolina Highway 417 [SC 417] in Mauldin to SC 56/I-26 in Clinton) was initially the first phase built of a South Carolina Department of Transportation (SCDOT) plan that predated the Interstate System to upgrade and bypass existing through routes, the goal of forming a single limited-access highway from Greenville to the port of Charleston via the state capital of Columbia. This plan was scrapped as soon as the future I-26 was added to the act of Congress that set into motion the Interstate System. As a result, I-26 was one of the first Interstates in the south to open in significant mileage (most in South Carolina between 1959 and 1963).

Before 1985, I-385 was only signed as such from downtown Greenville to I-85. The portion of the freeway from US 276 in Mauldin to the southern terminus at I-26 was signed as US 276. When the connecting portion was completed, the entire freeway was signed as I-385.

For seven months ending July 23, 2010, northbound traffic could not use a 15-mile (24 km) section of I-385 in Laurens County due to a $60.9-million (equivalent to $85.3 million in 2024) project to pave the portion extending from SC 101 to the I-385/I-26 interchange near Clinton in concrete. The closing of a major highway generated controversy. Closing the Interstate for construction saved approximately $34 million (equivalent to $47.6 million in 2024).

Between 2002 and 2012, I-385 was widened from two to three lanes in each direction from just north of exit 24 near Fountain Inn to just south of Woodruff Road/SC 146 (exit 35), with the portion between exits 31 and 35 resurfaced in concrete.

Between February 2016 and January 2020, the I-385/I-85 interchange was overhauled to decrease congestion and related accidents.

== Exit list ==
County	Location	mi	km	Exit	Destinations	Notes
Laurens	Clinton	0.00	0.00		I-26	Continuation beyond southern terminus to I-26 eastbound only; Exit 51 I-26 westbound only to I-385 northbound
Laurens	Clinton	2.00	3.22	2	SC 308 – Ora, Clinton	
Laurens	Laurens	5.31	8.55	5	SC 49 – Laurens, Union	
Laurens	Laurens	8.55	13.76	9	US 221 – Laurens, Enoree	
Laurens	Gray Court	10.34	16.64	10	Road 23 –Barksdale, Ora	Metric Road
Laurens	Gray Court	15.87	25.54	16	SC 101 – Woodruff, Gray Court	
Laurens	Gray Court	18.87	30.37	19	SC 14 east – Owings, Gray Court, Laurens	Southern end of SC 14 unsigned concurrency
Laurens	Fountain Inn	21.63	34.81	22	SC 14 west – Fountain Inn	Northern end of SC 14 unsigned concurrency, southbound signed only for Old Laurens Road
Greenville	Fountain Inn	23.10	37.18	23	SC 418 – Fountain Inn, Pelzer, Fork Shoals	
Greenville	Fountain Inn	24.11	38.80	24	Fairview Street – Fountain Inn	
Greenville	Simpsonville	25.77	41.47	26	Harrison Bridge Road	
Greenville	Simpsonville	27.13	43.66	27	Fairview Road – Simpsonville	
Greenville	Simpsonville	28.71	46.20	29	Georgia Road – Simpsonville	
Greenville	Mauldin	30.14	48.51	30	I-185 Toll north (Southern Connector) / US 276 west – Atlanta, Anderson, Mauldin	Northbound exit and southbound entrance; I-185 exit 1B; eastern terminus of US 276
Greenville	Mauldin	30.14	48.51	30	Old Stage Road / E. Standing Springs Road to US 276	Southbound exit and northbound entrance
Greenville	Mauldin	30.98	49.86	31	I-185 Toll north – Atlanta SC 417 (Laurens Road) – Simpsonville	Direct access to I-185 northbound at this exit only from I-385 southbound and SC 417
Greenville	Mauldin	33.07	53.22	33	Bridges Road – Mauldin	
Greenville	Mauldin	34.13	54.93	34	Butler Road – Mauldin	
Greenville	Mauldin	35.50	57.13	35	SC 146 (Woodruff Road)	
Greenville	Greenville	36.20	58.26	36	I-85 – Spartanburg, Atlanta	Signed as exits 36A (north) and 36B (south); I-85 exits 51B-C
Greenville	Greenville	37.29	60.01	37	Roper Mountain Road	
Greenville	Greenville	38.87	62.56	39	Haywood Road	
Greenville	Greenville	40.11	64.55	40	SC 291 (Pleasantburg Drive)	Signed as Exits 40A for northbound and 40B for southbound
Greenville	Greenville	41.86	67.37	42	US 276 (Laurens Road/Stone Avenue) – Travelers Rest	
Greenville	Greenville	42.16	67.85	—	East North Street (I-385 Bus. north)	Continuation as unsigned I-385 Bus.
1.000 mi = 1.609 km; 1.000 km = 0.621 mi: Concurrency terminus

== Interstate 385 Business ==
Interstate 385 Business
- Location: Greenville
- Length: 0.490 mi (789 m)
- Existed: 1962–present

Interstate 385 Business (I-385 Bus.) is a 0.490-mile (0.789 km) boulevard-grade business route of I-385 along North Street, between Stone Avenue (US 276) and Church Street (US 29). It is an unsigned highway. Its continuation along North Street becomes SC 183. It also connects to US 123 (Academy Street) and SC 183 (Beattie Place). Signage previously existed for this spur route but, by 2007, has been removed; appears only in the SCDOT Greenville–Spartanburg Metro map.
