= South Carolina Highway 290 =

State highway in South Carolina

South Carolina Highway 290

Route information
- Maintained by SCDOT
- Length: 30.582 mi (49.217 km)
- Existed: 1938–present

Major junctions
- West end: US 25 near Travelers Rest
- US 29 in Greer; I-85 in Duncan
- East end: US 221 in Moore

Location
- Country: United States
- State: South Carolina
- Counties: Greenville, Spartanburg

Highway system
- South Carolina State Highway System; Interstate; US; State; Scenic
| ← SC 288 | → SC 291 |

South Carolina Highway 290 (SC 290) is a 30.582-mile (49.217 km) state highway in the northwestern part of the U.S. state of South Carolina. It courses through central Greenville and Spartanburg Counties.

== Route description ==
The west terminus of South Carolina Highway 290 is with its junction with US Highway 25 (US 25) approximately halfway between Travelers Rest and Tigerville. It generally follows a southeast route through the small villages of Locust Hill and Sandy Flat before entering Greer. Within Greer, its course changes to an easterly direction and it continues over the county border into Spartanburg County. SC 290's course changes back to a southeasterly direction as it passes through Duncan. It then crosses Interstate 85 (I-85) at exit 63 and continues on until it reaches its east terminus, the junction with US 221, in Moore.

== Major intersections ==
| County | Location | mi | km | Destinations | Notes |
|---|---|---|---|---|---|
| Greenville | | 0.000 | 0.000 | US 25 | Western terminus |
| Greenville | Sandy Flat | 5.303 | 8.534 | SC 253 north (Mountain View Road) – Tigerville, North Greenville University | Western end of SC 253 concurrency |
| Greenville | Sandy Flat | 5.530 | 8.900 | SC 253 south (Sandy Flat Road) | Eastern end of SC 253 concurrency |
| Greenville | Fairview | 11.370 | 18.298 | SC 101 north | Western end of SC 101 concurrency |
| Greenville | Greer | 11.880 | 19.119 | US 29 south (Wade Hampton Boulevard) / SC 14 Truck south (Buncombe Street) – Greenville | Western end of US 29/SC 14 Truck concurrency |
| Greenville | Greer | 12.130 | 19.521 | US 29 north / SC 290 Truck east (Wade Hampton Boulevard / SC 14 Truck north) / Mount Vernon Road – Spartanburg | Eastern end of US 29/SC 14 Truck concurrency; western terminus of SC 290 Truck |
| Greenville | Greer | 13.800 | 22.209 | SC 14 (Main Street / SC 101 Truck south) | Northern terminus of SC 101 Truck |
| Greenville–Spartanburg county line | Greer | 14.120 | 22.724 | SC 101 south (South Line Street) / SC 357 north (North Line Street) – Apalache, Woodruff | Eastern end of SC 101 concurrency; southern terminus of SC 357 |
| Spartanburg | Greer | 15.916– 15.929 | 25.614– 25.635 | SC 80 (J. Verne Smith Parkway) | Interchange; eastern terminus of SC 290 Truck |
| Spartanburg | Duncan | 18.540 | 29.837 | SC 292 east (Spartanburg Road) – Lyman | Western terminus of SC 292 |
| Spartanburg | Duncan | 21.385 | 34.416 | I-85 – Greenville, Spartanburg | I-85 exit 63 |
| Spartanburg | | 24.427 | 39.311 | SC 296 (Reidville Road) | |
| Spartanburg | | 25.700 | 41.360 | SC 417 | |
| Spartanburg | Moore | 30.582 | 49.217 | US 221 | Eastern terminus |
1.000 mi = 1.609 km; 1.000 km = 0.621 mi: Concurrency terminus

== Greer truck route ==
South Carolina Highway 290 Truck
- Location: Greer
- Length: 5.810 mi (9.350 km)

South Carolina Highway 290 Truck (SC 290 Truck) is a 5.810-mile (9.350 km) truck route that is nearly entirely within the northern part of Greer. Approximately half of its length is in Greenville County and the other half is in Spartanburg County. It has concurrencies with U.S. Route 29 (US 29), SC 14 Truck, and SC 80.

The truck route begins at an intersection with US 29 (Wade Hampton Boulevard), at that highway's northern intersection with SC 101/SC 290. This intersection is in the east-central portion of Greenville County. US 29, SC 14 Truck, and SC 290 Truck travel to the east-northeast. Just before an intersection with the southern terminus of Ashmore Street, the roadway begins to curve to the east-southeast. Then, they intersect SC 14 (North Main Street). Here, SC 14 Truck reaches its northern terminus, while US 29 and SC 290 Truck continue to the east-southeast and then enter the southwestern part of Spartanburg County. A short distance later, they meet SC 357 (Arlington Road). They curve to the east-northeast and then leave the city limits. They have a very brief portion back in the city before leaving again. Then, they cross over the South Tyger River before they intersect the eastern terminus of SC 80 (J. Verne Smith Parkway) and the southern terminus of Gary Armstrong Road. Here, SC 290 Truck turns right, off of US 29 and onto SC 80. Here, they re-enter Greer.

SC 80 and SC 290 Truck travel to the south-southeast. Almost immediately, they cross over the South Tyger River. Then, they curve to the southwest and leave the city limits again. They bend to the south-southwest and then travel on a bridge over some railroad tracks of CSX. Immediately, they have an interchange with SC 290 (East Poinsett Street Extension). Here, they re-enter the city, and SC 290 Truck reaches its eastern terminus.

The entire route is in Greer.

| County | mi | km | Destinations | Notes |
|---|---|---|---|---|
| Greenville | 0.000 | 0.000 | SC 101 south / SC 290 east (West Poinsett Street) / Mt. Vernon Road north – Greer US 29 south / SC 101 north / SC 290 west (Wade Hampton Boulevard / SC 14 Truck south) – Greenville, Greenville Tech Benson Campus | Western end of US 29 and SC 14 Truck concurrencies; western terminus of SC 290 Truck; southern terminus of Mt. Vernon Road |
| Greenville | 1.770 | 2.849 | SC 14 (North Main Street) / SC 14 Truck ends – Landrum, City stadium | Eastern end of SC 14 Truck concurrency; eastern terminus of SC 14 Truck |
| Spartanburg | 2.370 | 3.814 | SC 357 (Arlington Road) – Apalache | |
| Spartanburg | 4.360 | 7.017 | US 29 north (Wade Hampton Boulevard) / SC 80 begins / Gary Armstrong Road north – Lyman | Eastern end of US 29 concurrency; western end of SC 80 concurrency; eastern terminus of SC 80; southern terminus of Gary Armstrong Road |
| Spartanburg | 5.810 | 9.350 | SC 80 west (J. Verne Smith Parkway) / SC 290 (East Poinsett Street Extension) – Greer, Duncan | Eastern end of SC 80 concurrency; eastern terminus |
1.000 mi = 1.609 km; 1.000 km = 0.621 mi: Concurrency terminus
