= U.S. Route 29 in South Carolina =

Highway in South Carolina

U.S. Highway 29
- US 29 in South Carolina highlighted in red

Route information
- Maintained by SCDOT
- Length: 110.202 mi (177.353 km)
- Existed: 1927–present

Major junctions
- South end: US 29 / SR 8 at the Georgia state line near Hartwell, GA
- US 76 / US 178 in Anderson; I-85 (numerous times); I-185 / US 25 near Greenville; US 123 in Greenville; US 276 in Greenville; I-26 in Spartanburg; US 221 / SC 56 in Spartanburg; US 176 / SC 9 in Spartanburg
- North end: US 29 at the North Carolina state line near Grover, NC

Location
- Country: United States
- State: South Carolina
- Counties: Anderson, Greenville, Spartanburg, Cherokee

Highway system
- United States Numbered Highway System; List; Special; Divided; South Carolina State Highway System; Interstate; US; State; Scenic
← SC 28	→ SC 30

U.S. Highway 29 (US 29) is a 110.202-mile (177.353 km) north–south United States Numbered Highway that travels from the Savannah River to Blacksburg, entirely in Upstate South Carolina.

== Route description ==
US 29 enters South Carolina crossing the Savannah River, downstream from Hartwell Dam, and proceeds to travel along the forested eastern edge of Lake Hartwell for 3.2 miles (5.1 km), where it meets up with Old US 29. From there, it goes on a northeasterly direction toward Anderson. Three miles (4.8 km) outside Anderson, US 29 Business (US 29 Bus.) takes a left turn and more direct route into the downtown area; while mainline US 29 continues east, with most signage signed "Truck" instead of the more usual "Bypass" (state maps confirm it is the mainline route). At South Carolina Highway 81 (SC 81), US 29 takes a left turn and follows briefly before taking a right turn at Shockley Ferry Road. Crossing SC 28 Bus., the road widens to an undivided four-lane highway, continuing until reaching River Street (US 76/US 178); where US 29 makes another right turn and then soon left again. US 29 meets back with US 29 Bus. at Williamston Road. Continuing northeast for another eight miles (13 km), US 29 makes a junction with US 29 Connector that leads to SC 20 in Williamston; the highway briefly divides at junction. With another 6.5 miles (10.5 km), US 29 merges with northbound Interstate 85 (I-85; exit 34, northbound exit and southbound entrance only).

After traveling in concurrency with I-85, US 29 switches onto I-185 at exit 42 (exit 14B on I-185). After 2.5 miles (4.0 km), I-185 ends at Henrydale Avenue; US 29 continues along Mills Avenue, followed by Church Street (staying straight), through Downtown Greenville. At North Street and Academy Street (US 123), travelers can connect to I-385; between the two streets is the Bon Secours Wellness Arena. Church Street eventually ends onto Wade Hampton Boulevard, which is a divided six-lane highway from Greenville to Greer.

Once after passing through Greer, the highway shrinks to a divided four-lane highway, continuing through Lyman and Wellford. After passing I-85 (exit 66) and I-26 (exit 21), US 29 enters Spartanburg and through one of the busiest commercial areas in the city, centered at WestGate Mall (the highway is widen to six lanes throughout the commercial area). As US 29 enters the city center area, it takes a left onto Saint John Street, then proceeds to parallel Main Street before rejoining 1.5 miles (2.4 km) later. At Pine Street (US 176/SC 9), travelers can connect to I-585. US 29 continues in a northeasterly direction into Cowpens, where the highway reduces down to two lanes through town.

After passing through Cowpens, the road widens again to an undivided four-lane highway for 2.7 miles (4.3 km) before entering into Gaffney. Continuing as a two-lane road through both Gaffney and Blacksburg, it crosses one last time with I-85 (exit 106), before entering North Carolina.

== History ==
From its inception until 1959, US 29 was the main thoroughfare in Upstate South Carolina and connecting regionally with Atlanta and Charlotte. Though still important in the upstate, it now takes a traveler on a more indirect route compared to I-85.

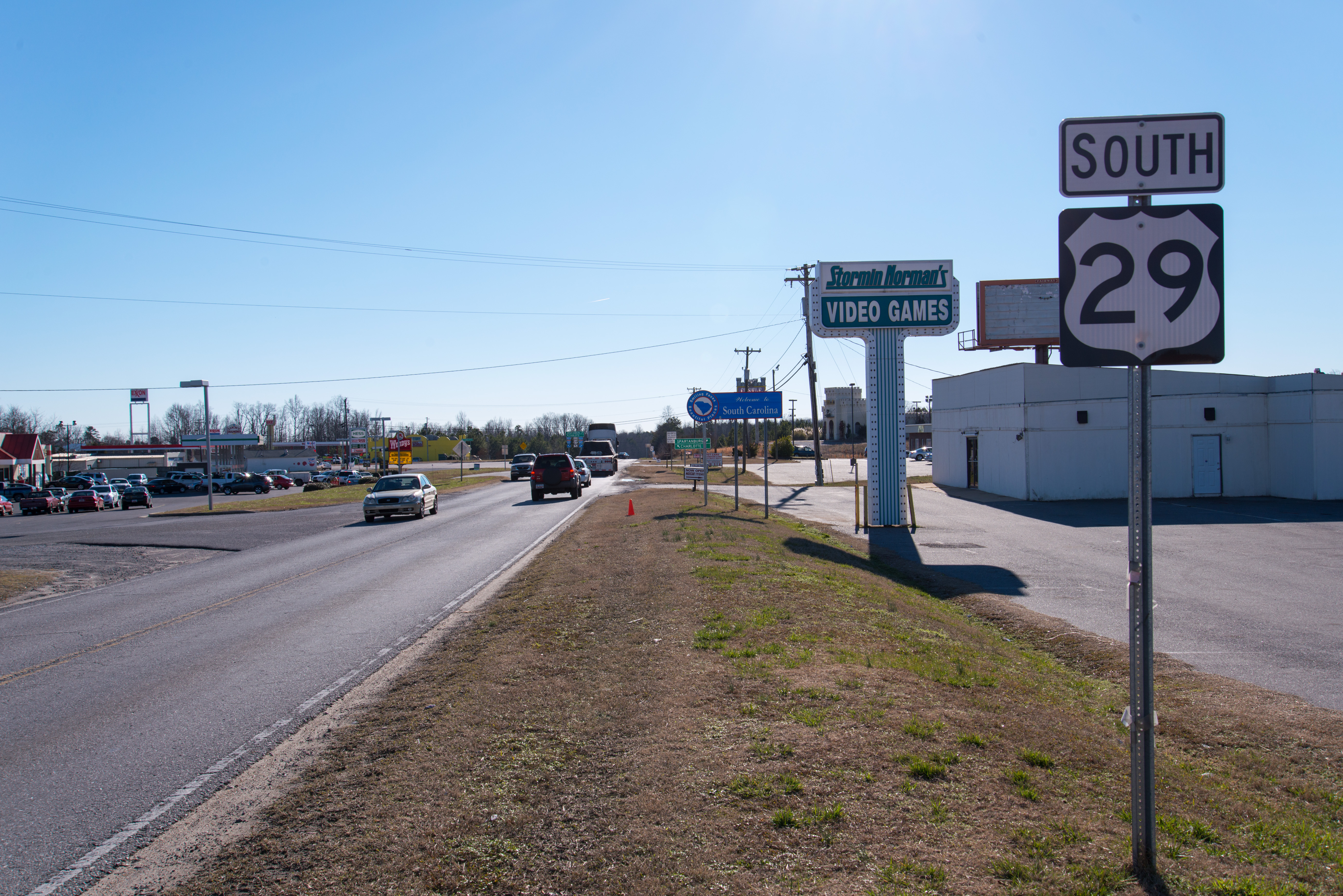
First sign of US 29, after the North Carolina state line, near Blacksburg

Established in 1927 as an original U.S. Highway, it generally traversed the same today as it then when created; from Georgia to North Carolina, via Anderson, Greenville, Greer, Spartanburg, Gaffney, and Blacksburg. The entire route was in concurrency with SC 8.

In 1928, SC 8 was rerouted completely off US 29. In 1935, US 29 was rerouted onto new alignment between Anderson and Greenville. The old routing using Greenville Road onto Old Anderson Road, then east on Pendleton Road and finally Main Street was renumbered as SC 81. The new routing turns at Williamson Road, to Williamston, Pelzer, and Piedmont, before entering Greenville on Grove Road, Allen Street, Pendleton Street, and finally Main Street. The new alignment replaced SC 248 and part of SC 20.

In 1938, US 29 was rerouted from Greenville northward and from using Main Street, to Buncombe Road, to Rutherford Avenue, and to Camp Road into Greer. The new routing follows Main Street to Stone Avenue and finally to Wade Hampton Boulevard.

Between 1943 and 1946, US 29 was moved onto new road bypassing Greer and Duncan. In 1947, US 29 was given a southeastern bypass of Anderson, creating a business loop through downtown. In 1948, US 29 was rerouted onto Grove and Augusta roads, leaving Allen and Green streets, in Greenville.

By 1955, US 29 was rerouted onto a new super-two highway north of Spartanburg, Cowpens, Gaffney, and Blacksburg; the old route became US 29 Alternate (US 29 Alt.). In 1957 or 1958, US 29 was rerouted onto a new super-two highway, bypassing Williamston, Pelzer, and Piedmont; the old alignment later became connector route for US 29/SC 20. It then went onto new road connecting with US 25 and SC 291. In concurrency with SC 291, it reaches Wade Hampton Boulevard; leaving behind a business loop through downtown Greenville. In 1959, I-85 was assigned from Spartanburg to North Carolina, in concurrency with US 29, once the highway was expanded into four lanes.

In 1962, US 29 was removed from I-85 from Spartanburg to North Carolina and was moved back on its original routing, replacing US 29 Alt. In the Greenville area, US 29 was rerouted back through Greenville along I-185, which connected directly via Church Street, to Wade Hampton Boulevard. US 29 Bus. in Greenville was decommissioned as a result. The old alignment to SC 291 became part of I-85. Finally, at the South Carolina–Georgia state line, US 29 was rerouted south from SC 412 to avoid the new Lake Hartwell. Most of old US 29 is underwater, with parts of it above surface used for marina purposes.

In 1974, US 29 was rerouted onto Saint Johns Avenue from Main Street, in Spartanburg.

== Major intersections ==
County	Location	mi	km	Exit	Destinations	Notes
Anderson		0.0	0.0		US 29 south / SR 8 south – Hartwell	Continuation from Georgia over the Savannah River near Hartwell Dam
Anderson	Holland Store	2.8	4.5		SC 412 east (Rainey Road) – Starr, Iva	
Anderson		4.1	6.6		SC 187	To Sadlers Creek State Park
Anderson		12.8	20.6		US 29 Bus. north (Sayre Street) – Anderson	Southern terminus of US 29 Bus.
Anderson		14.0	22.5		SC 81 south (Murray Avenue) – Starr	Southern end of SC 81 concurrency
Anderson		14.1	22.7		SC 28 (Pearman Dairy Road)	
Anderson		14.2	22.9		SC 81 north (Murray Avenue) – Anderson	Northern end of SC 81 concurrency
Anderson		14.6	23.5		SC 81 Bus. (Main Street)	
Anderson	Anderson	16.2	26.1		US 76 west (East River Street) / US 178 west – Athens, Atlanta	Southern end of US 76/US 178 concurrency
Anderson	Anderson	16.8	27.0		US 76 east (East River Street) / US 178 east – Belton	Northern end of US 76/US 178 concurrency
Anderson	Anderson	17.8	28.6		US 29 Bus. south (Williamston Road) – Anderson	To Anderson University
Anderson		25.6	41.2		US 29 Conn. north (Anderson Highway) to SC 20 – Williamston, Pelzer	Southern terminus of US 29 Conn.
Anderson		30.6	49.2		SC 8 (Easley Highway) – West Pelzer, Pelzer, Williamston	
Anderson		32.9	52.9	34	I-85 south – Atlanta	Southern end of I-85 concurrency; southbound left exit and northbound entrance
Anderson		34.2	55.0	35	SC 86 – Piedmont, Easley	
Anderson	Easley	37.9	61.0	39	River Road – Easley	
Anderson	Easley	39.2	63.1	40	SC 153 – Easley	
Greenville		40.8	65.7		I-85 north / I-185 south (Southern Connector) – Spartanburg, Columbia	Northern end of I-85 concurrency; southern end of I-185 concurrency; I-85 exit 42; I-185 exit 14B
Greenville		41.9	67.4	15	US 25 (White Horse Road) – Travelers Rest	Northbound exit and southbound entrance
Greenville	Greenville	42.0	67.6	16	US 25 / SC 20 (Piedmont Highway) – Piedmont	Southbound exit and northbound entrance
Greenville	Greenville	43.6	70.2		Henrydale Avenue	Northern end of I-185 concurrency; northern terminus of I-185
Greenville	Greenville	44.5	71.6		SC 20 (Augusta Street) – Asheville, Greenwood	
Greenville	Greenville	45.4	73.1		Downtown Greenville (Camperdown Way)	Interchange
Greenville	Greenville	45.6	73.4		East McBee Avenue – Downtown Greenville	Northbound exit only
Greenville	Greenville	46.0	74.0		East North Street (I-385 Bus. south)	East North Street is eastbound only; northern terminus of southbound lanes of I-385 Bus.
Greenville	Greenville	46.1	74.2		Beattie Place (I-385 Bus. south)	Beattie Place is westbound only; northern terminus of northbound lanes of I-385 Bus.
Greenville	Greenville	46.3	74.5		US 123 (Academy Street) – Asheville, Greenwood	
Greenville	Greenville	46.6	75.0		Column Street (US 29 Spur north)	Southern terminus of US 29 Spur and Column Street
Greenville	Greenville	47.0	75.6		Wade Hampton Boulevard south (US 29 Conn. south) – Greenville Zoo	Northern terminus of US 29 Conn.; US 29 turns right off of North Church Street and onto Wade Hampton Boulevard.
Greenville	Greenville	48.7	78.4		SC 291 (Pleasantburg Drive)	
Greenville	Wade Hampton	48.9	78.7		Pine Knoll Drive (US 29 Conn. south) to SC 291 south – Greenville Convention Center, Greenville Technical College, University Center	Northern terminus of US 29 Conn.
Greenville	Greer	56.1	90.3		SC 14 Truck south / SC 101 north / SC 290 west (Buncombe Street)	Southern end of SC 14 Truck and SC 101/SC 290 concurrencies
Greenville	Greer	56.4	90.8		SC 101 south / SC 290 east (Poinsett Street) / SC 290 Truck begins	Northern end of SC 101/SC 290 concurrency; southern end of SC 290 Truck concurrency; northern terminus of SC 290 Truck
Greenville	Greer	58.2	93.7		SC 14 (Main Street) / SC 14 Truck – Landrum	Northern end of SC 14 Truck concurrency; northern terminus of SC 14 Truck
Spartanburg	Greer	58.8	94.6		SC 357 (Arlington Road)	
Spartanburg	Greer	60.7	97.7		SC 80 west / SC 290 Truck south (J. Verne Smith Parkway)	Northern end of SC 290 Truck concurrency; eastern terminus of SC 80
Spartanburg	Lyman	63.7	102.5		SC 129 east / SC 292 east (Charlotte Highway) to SC 358	Southern end of SC 292 concurrency
Spartanburg	Lyman	63.8	102.7		SC 292 west (Groce Road)	Northern end of SC 292 concurrency
Spartanburg	Wellford	64.5	103.8		Astor Street (SC 292 Conn. west)	Eastern terminus of SC 292 Conn.
Spartanburg		66.8	107.5		I-85 – Greenville, Charlotte	I-85 exit 66
Spartanburg	Spartanburg	71.6	115.2		I-26 – Columbia, Asheville	I-26 exits 21A-B
Spartanburg	Spartanburg	71.9	115.7		SC 295 (Blackstock Road)	
Spartanburg	Spartanburg	74.8	120.4		SC 296 west (John B. White Sr. Boulevard)	Eastern terminus of SC 296
Spartanburg	Spartanburg	75.6	121.7		US 221 / SC 56 (Church Street) – Inman, Chesnee, Roebuck	
Spartanburg	Spartanburg	76.3	122.8		US 176 / SC 9 (Pine Street) – Inman, Pacolet	
Spartanburg	Cowpens	84.7	136.3		SC 110 north (Battleground Road) – Chesnee	
Cherokee	Gaffney	94.6	152.2		SC 105 (Hyatt Street / Corry Street)	To Limestone College
Cherokee	Gaffney	95.9	154.3		SC 11 / SC 18 (Frederick Street) – Union	
Cherokee	Gaffney	96.1	154.7		SC 150 (Limestone Street) to SC 18 – Pacolet, Shelby, Gastonia, Charlotte	
Cherokee		100.2	161.3		SC 329 (Victory Trail Road)	
Cherokee	Blacksburg	105.3	169.5		SC 5 (York Road) – Shelby, York	
Cherokee		109.8	176.7		I-85 – Charlotte, Spartanburg	I-85 exit 106
Cherokee		110.2	177.3		US 29 north – Grover	Continuation into North Carolina
1.000 mi = 1.609 km; 1.000 km = 0.621 mi: Concurrency terminus; Incomplete access

== See also ==
- Special routes of U.S. Route 29

U.S. Route 29
Previous state: Georgia	South Carolina	Next state: North Carolina
