= Greenville County, South Carolina =

County in South Carolina, United States

- County
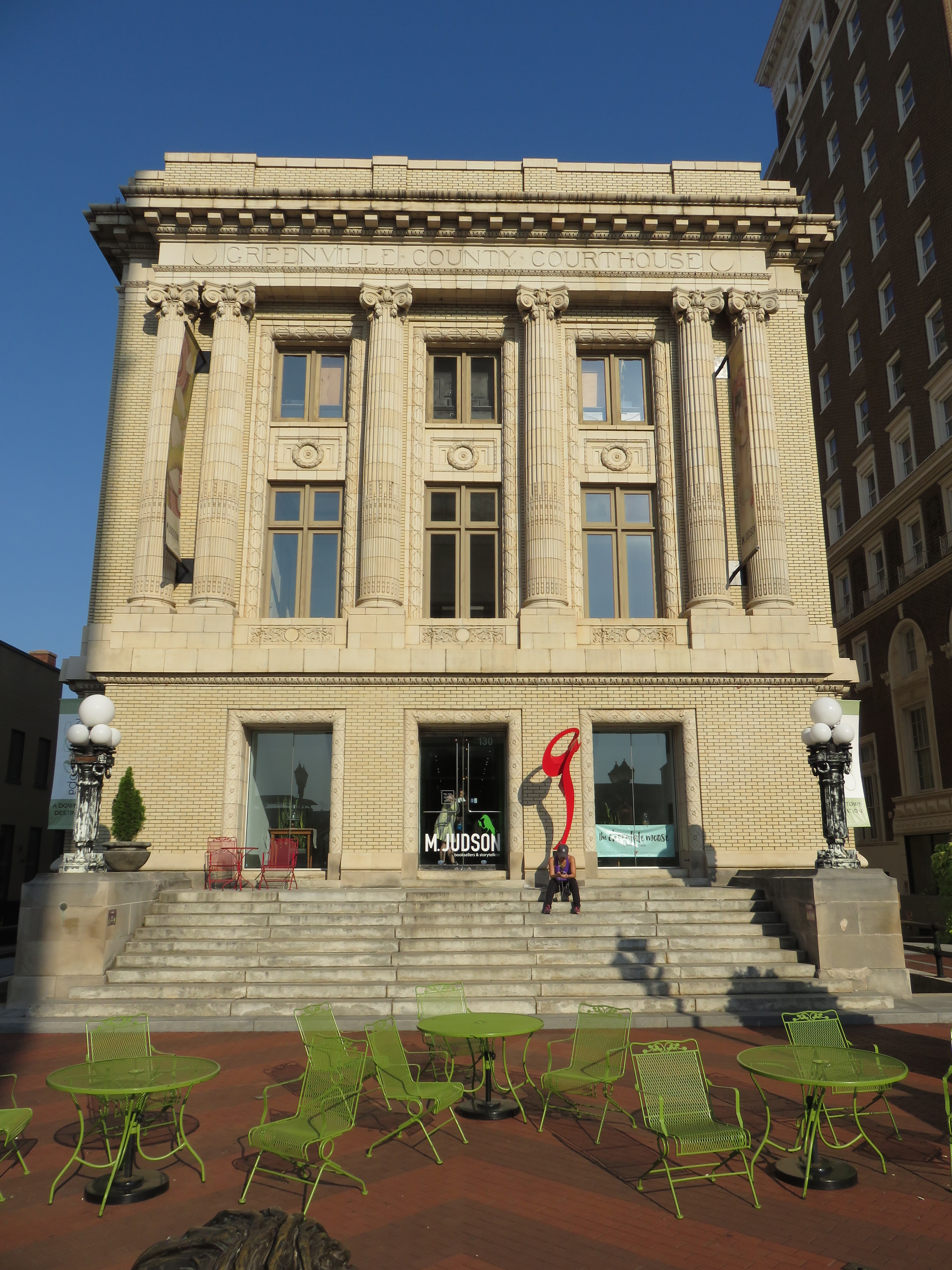
- Old Greenville County Courthouse

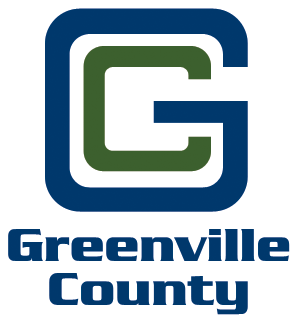
- Seal Logo
- Motto: "Unrivaled Quality Of Life"
- Location within the U.S. state of South Carolina
- Coordinates: 34°53′N 82°22′W
- Country: United States
- State: South Carolina
- Founded: 1786
- Named for: Nathanael Greene
- Seat: Greenville
- Largest community: Greenville

Government
  - County Administrator: Joseph M. Kernell

Area
  - Total: 795.57 sq mi (2,060.5 km^{2})
  - Land: 785.93 sq mi (2,035.5 km^{2})
  - Water: 9.64 sq mi (25.0 km^{2}) 1.21%

Population (2020)
  - Total: 525,534
  - Estimate (2025): 583,125 ▲
  - Density: 668.68/sq mi (258.18/km^{2})
- Time zone: UTC−5 (Eastern)
  - Summer (DST): UTC−4 (EDT)
- Congressional districts: 3rd, 4th
- Website: www.greenvillecounty.org

Greenville County (/ˈɡriːnvɪl/ GREEN-vil; locally /ˈɡriːnvəl/ GREEN-vəl) is located in the U.S. state of South Carolina. As of the 2020 census, the population was 525,534, making it the most populous county in the state. Its county seat is Greenville. The county is also home to the Greenville County School District, the largest school system in South Carolina. It is the central county of the Greenville-Anderson-Greer, SC Metropolitan Statistical Area, which in turn is part of the Greenville-Spartanburg-Anderson, SC Combined Statistical Area.

== History ==
=== 18th and 19th centuries ===
In 1786, due to population growth in Ninety-Six District and the victory of the American Whigs over the British and their colonial Tory and Cherokee allies, the state legislature formed Greenville County (originally spelled Greeneville), named for General Nathanael Greene, the hero of the American southern campaign. Greenville County was the first county created in the overarching Ninety-Six District, but from 1791 to 1798, both neighboring Pendleton County (the other county formed from Cherokee territory in northwestern Ninety-Six District) and it were part of the new overarching Washington District. From 1798 to 1800, it was part of the short-lived overarching Pendleton District. In 1798, all counties were reidentified as "elective districts" to be effective on January 1, 1800; thereafter, the Greenville District was no longer part of Pendleton District. In 1868, the districts were converted back to counties. After the Civil War ended in the 1860s, former slaves gained freedom, the textile industry grew quickly, and cotton farming expanded in the county. Completion of the Southern Railway in 1893 joined the local economy with the rest of the nation.

=== 20th century ===
The Atlantic Coast Line Railroad's consolidation into the 1900s further linked the county with the national economy, and dozens of textile companies opened, with farm workers migrating to associated mill villages. World War I and creation of the Army National Guard's Camp Sevier in Taylors further increased the county's outside connections in the early 20th century. Duke's Mayonnaise was started in Greenville in 1917 and still has its company headquarters in the county.

World War II brought additional contracts for the textile industry in the 1940s. After the war ended, agriculture decreased and business leaders such as Charles E. Daniel and Roger Milliken pursued other industries to replace textiles. Donaldson Air Force Base was converted into an industrial air park (now Donaldson Center Airport) in the early 1960s, and Greenville–Spartanburg International Airport opened then as well.

The 1960s brought gradual racial desegregation until the county's whole school district was integrated in January 1970. Interstate highways I-85, I-185, and I-385 first crossed the county in the 1960s, promoting growth and better economic placement. The mid-1960s reapportionment of state legislative representation into equal-population election districts brought political change, with metropolitan counties such as Greenville gaining influence over rural counties. Greenville County politicians were elected as state house and senate leaders and as state governors (Richard Riley and Carroll A. Campbell Jr.) in the 1960s, 1970s, and 1980s.

== Geography ==
According to the U.S. Census Bureau, the county has a total area of 795.57 square miles (2,060.5 km^{2}), of which 785.93 square miles (2,035.5 km^{2}) is land and 9.64 square miles (25.0 km^{2}) (1.21%) is water. The northern border follows natural ridge lines and crests of the Blue Ridge Mountains, resulting in a small portion of the county being the northernmost in South Carolina.

=== State and local protected areas/sites ===
- Ashmore Heritage Preserve/Wildlife Management Area
- Bald Rock Heritage Preserve
- Belvue Springs Heritage Preserve
- Blackwell Heritage Preserve
- Blue Wall Preserve
- Bunched Arrowhead Heritage Preserve
- Caesars Head/Jones Gap
- Caesars Head State Park
- Cedar Falls Park
- Chestnut Ridge Heritage Preserve and Wildlife Management Area
- Clear Creek Heritage Preserve
- Conestee Nature Preserve
- Eva Russell Chandler Heritage Preserve/Wildlife Management Area
- Falls Park on the Reedy
- Greenville Zoo
- J. Verne Smith Park (Lake Robinson)
- Jones Gap State Park
- Mills Mill
- Mountain Bridge Wilderness Area
- Paris Mountain State Park
- Pleasant Valley Park
- Poinsett Bridge Heritage Preserve
- Tall Pines Wildlife Management Area
- Upcountry History Museum
- Watson-Cooper Heritage Preserve/Wildlife Management Area

=== Major water bodies ===
- Enoree River
- North Saluda Reservoir
- North Saluda River
- Reedy River
- Saluda River
- South Pacolet River
- South Saluda River

=== Adjacent counties ===
- Henderson County, North Carolina – north
- Polk County, North Carolina – northeast
- Spartanburg County – east
- Laurens County – southeast
- Abbeville County – south
- Anderson County – southwest
- Pickens County – west
- Transylvania County, North Carolina – northwest

=== Major highways ===
- I-85
- I-185 / I-185 Toll
- I-385
- I-385 BS
- US 25
- US 25 Conn.
- US 29
- US 29 Conn. (Greenville)
- US 29 Conn. (Wade Hampton)
- US 123
- US 276
- US 276 Conn.
- SC 11
- SC 14
- SC 14 Truck
- SC 20
- SC 86
- SC 101
- SC 101 Truck
- SC 124
- SC 146
- SC 183
- SC 253
- SC 288
- SC 290
- SC 290 Truck
- SC 291
- SC 417
- SC 418

=== Major infrastructure ===
- Donaldson Center Airport
- Greenville Downtown Airport
- Greenville–Spartanburg International Airport (mostly in Spartanburg County)
- Greenville Station (Amtrak)

== Demographics ==
Historical population
Census	Pop.	Note	%±
1790	6,503		—
1800	11,504		76.9%
1810	13,133		14.2%
1820	14,530		10.6%
1830	16,476		13.4%
1840	17,839		8.3%
1850	20,156		13.0%
1860	21,892		8.6%
1870	22,262		1.7%
1880	37,496		68.4%
1890	44,310		18.2%
1900	53,490		20.7%
1910	68,377		27.8%
1920	88,498		29.4%
1930	117,009		32.2%
1940	136,580		16.7%
1950	168,152		23.1%
1960	209,776		24.8%
1970	240,546		14.7%
1980	287,913		19.7%
1990	320,167		11.2%
2000	379,616		18.6%
2010	451,225		18.9%
2020	525,534		16.5%
2025 (est.)	583,125	▲	11.0%
U.S. Decennial Census; 1790–1960 1900–1990; 1990–2000 2010 2020

=== Racial and ethnic composition ===
Greenville County, South Carolina – Racial and ethnic composition Note: the US Census treats Hispanic/Latino as an ethnic category. This table excludes Latinos from the racial categories and assigns them to a separate category. Hispanics/Latinos may be of any race.
Race / Ethnicity (NH = Non-Hispanic)	Pop 1980	Pop 1990	Pop 2000	Pop 2010	Pop 2020	% 1980	% 1990	% 2000	% 2010	% 2020
White alone (NH)	233,777	257,069	286,663	317,197	343,897	81.20%	80.29%	75.51%	70.30%	65.44%
Black or African American alone (NH)	50,420	57,485	69,042	80,569	87,124	17.51%	17.95%	18.19%	17.86%	16.58%
Native American or Alaska Native alone (NH)	285	439	611	915	893	0.10%	0.14%	0.16%	0.20%	0.17%
Asian alone (NH)	878	2,082	5,178	8,772	12,875	0.30%	0.65%	1.36%	1.94%	2.45%
Native Hawaiian or Pacific Islander alone (NH)	x	x	127	217	398	x	x	0.03%	0.05%	0.08%
Other race alone (NH)	338	64	337	717	2,345	0.12%	0.02%	0.09%	0.16%	0.45%
Mixed race or Multiracial (NH)	x	x	3,375	6,343	19,977	x	x	0.89%	1.41%	3.80%
Hispanic or Latino (any race)	2,215	3,028	14,283	36,495	58,025	0.77%	0.95%	3.76%	8.09%	11.04%
Total	287,913	320,167	379,616	451,225	525,534	100.00%	100.00%	100.00%	100.00%	100.00%

=== 2020 census ===
As of the 2020 census, 525,534 people and 130,296 families resided in the county. The median age was 38.7 years; 22.7% of residents were under the age of 18 and 16.9% were 65 years of age or older. For every 100 females there were 93.9 males, and for every 100 females age 18 and over there were 91.0 males.

The racial makeup of the county was 67.2% White, 16.8% Black or African American, 0.5% American Indian and Alaska Native, 2.5% Asian, 0.1% Native Hawaiian and Pacific Islander, 5.9% from some other race, and 7.1% from two or more races. Hispanic or Latino residents of any race comprised 11.0% of the population.

88.1% of residents lived in urban areas, while 11.9% lived in rural areas.

There were 209,082 households in the county, of which 30.4% had children under the age of 18 living with them and 28.2% had a female householder with no spouse or partner present. About 27.9% of all households were made up of individuals and 10.5% had someone living alone who was 65 years of age or older.

There were 226,215 housing units, of which 7.6% were vacant. Among occupied housing units, 66.4% were owner-occupied and 33.6% were renter-occupied. The homeowner vacancy rate was 1.5% and the rental vacancy rate was 9.0%.

=== 2010 census ===
At the 2000 census, 451,225 people, 176,531 households, and 119,362 families were residing in the county. The population density was 574.7 inhabitants per square mile (221.9/km^{2}). The 195,462 housing units had an average density of 249.0 per square mile (96.1/km^{2}). The racial makeup of the county was 73.8% White, 18.1% African American, 2.0% Asian, 0.3% American Indian, 0.1% Pacific Islander, 3.9% from other races, and 1.9% from two or more races. Those of Hispanic or Latino origin made up 8.1% of the population. In terms of ancestry, 13.0% were American, 11.6% were German, 10.9% were English, and 10.7% were Irish.

Of the 176,531 households, 33.7% had children under 18 living with them, 49.7% were married couples living together, 13.5% had a female householder with no husband present, 32.4% were not families, and 27.0% were made up of individuals. The average household size was 2.49, and the average family size was 3.03. The median age was 37.2 years.

The median income for a household in the county was $46,830 and for a family was $59,043. Males had a median income of $45,752 versus $33,429 for females. The per capita income for the county was $25,931. About 10.8% of families and 14.1% of the population were below the poverty line, including 20.0% of those under age 18 and 9.1% of those age 65 or over.

=== Ancestry ===
As of 2016, the largest self-reported ancestry groups in Greenville County were:

Ancestry	Percent (2016)
English (England)	12.9%
German (Germany)	11.0%
Irish (Republic of Ireland)	10.2%
American (United States)	9.9%
Scotch-Irish (Ulster)	3.1%
Italian (Italy)	3.1%
Scottish (Scotland)	2.9%
French (France)	2.2%
Polish (Poland)	1.5%
Dutch (Netherlands)	1.2%
Welsh (Wales)	0.7%
Swedish (Sweden)	0.7%
Norwegian (Norway)	0.6%

== Government and politics ==
Greenville County is governed by a 12-member county council. The current county administrator is Joseph Kernell, whom the council appointed in January 2004 after voting in late 2003 to hire him. Kernell was previously the county administrator for St. Charles County, Missouri. Other staff hired by the council include a clerk and an attorney.

Council members are elected by voters in each of the 12 state house districts (17–28) within the county and serve staggered four-year terms.

County Council members
District	Name / party	Home	Elected
17	Joey Russo	Travelers Rest	2022
18	Kelly Long	Greer	2024
19	Benton Blount (chair)	Greenville	2022
20	Steve Shaw	Travelers Rest	2020
21	Curt McGahhey	Simpsonville	2024
22	Frank Farmer	Greenville	2024
23	Alan Mitchell	Greenville	2022
24	Liz Seman	Greenville	2008
25	Ennis M. Fant Jr.	Greenville	2016 (1984)
26	Rick Bradley (vice chair)	Pelzer	2022
27	Garey Collins	Simpsonville	2024
28	Dan Tripp	Mauldin	2018

United States presidential election results for Greenville County, South Carolina
Year	Republican		Democratic		Third party(ies)	
Year	No.	%	No.	%	No.	%
1892	600	16.28%	3,026	82.09%	60	1.63%
1896	288	9.47%	2,718	89.38%	35	1.15%
1900	47	2.58%	1,777	97.42%	0	0.00%
1904	66	2.58%	2,489	97.42%	0	0.00%
1908	176	5.90%	2,774	92.93%	35	1.17%
1912	0	0.00%	3,140	98.28%	55	1.72%
1916	81	2.31%	3,384	96.66%	36	1.03%
1920	144	3.16%	4,409	96.84%	0	0.00%
1924	59	1.54%	3,728	97.36%	42	1.10%
1928	546	11.71%	4,116	88.25%	2	0.04%
1932	126	1.56%	7,930	98.41%	2	0.02%
1936	92	1.09%	8,310	98.91%	0	0.00%
1940	514	5.95%	8,118	94.05%	0	0.00%
1944	711	8.78%	7,107	87.81%	276	3.41%
1948	789	8.33%	2,745	28.97%	5,940	62.70%
1952	17,743	54.42%	14,863	45.58%	0	0.00%
1956	10,752	39.54%	11,819	43.46%	4,622	17.00%
1960	22,657	61.85%	13,976	38.15%	0	0.00%
1964	29,358	62.96%	17,275	37.04%	0	0.00%
1968	31,652	52.91%	12,928	21.61%	15,241	25.48%
1972	46,360	79.62%	10,143	17.42%	1,726	2.96%
1976	39,099	51.46%	35,943	47.31%	939	1.24%
1980	46,168	57.41%	32,135	39.96%	2,112	2.63%
1984	66,766	73.07%	24,137	26.42%	466	0.51%
1988	67,371	70.82%	27,188	28.58%	567	0.60%
1992	65,066	57.12%	34,651	30.42%	14,190	12.46%
1996	71,210	59.13%	41,605	34.55%	7,605	6.32%
2000	92,714	66.09%	43,810	31.23%	3,769	2.69%
2004	111,481	66.03%	55,347	32.78%	2,005	1.19%
2008	116,363	61.03%	70,886	37.18%	3,408	1.79%
2012	121,685	62.99%	68,070	35.23%	3,434	1.78%
2016	127,832	59.41%	74,483	34.62%	12,850	5.97%
2020	150,021	58.11%	103,030	39.91%	5,104	1.98%
2024	158,541	60.21%	100,074	38.01%	4,701	1.79%

From the latter half of the 20th century onward, Greenville County has voted overwhelmingly Republican in presidential elections. It has gone Republican in every presidential election since 1960, and in all but one election since 1952. Jimmy Carter of neighboring Georgia failed to win the county in 1976 despite winning the state. Carter's 1976 run is the last time a Democrat received 40% or more of the county's vote, and one of only two official Democratic candidates to do so since 1948. In 2020, Joe Biden became the first Democrat to obtain over 100,000 votes in the county, and Donald Trump's 18.2% margin of victory was the lowest for any Republican since 1980. Biden came within 320 votes of being only the second Democrat in 64 years to win 40% of the county's vote.

The county also rejects Democrats at the state level; it was one of the first areas of the state where Republicans were able to break the long Democratic monopoly on state and local offices. In South Carolina politics, conservative Greenville and Myrtle Beach are a counterbalance to the liberal Charleston and Columbia, and the moderate Charlotte suburbs. However, in the 2026 United States Senate election in South Carolina it flipped to support the Democratic candidate Annie Andrews in her upset victory against the incumbent Republican senator Darline Graham.

=== Law enforcement ===
When Greenville County was formed in 1786, it was served by the sheriff of the Ninety Six District. A Washington District, including Greenville and Pendleton Counties, existed from 1791 to 1799. (Pendleton was split in 1826 into Pickens and Anderson Counties.) One of the district's first sheriffs, Revolutionary War hero Robert Maxwell, served from 1795 to 1797, when he was killed in an ambush.

Sheriffs in South Carolina were originally elected by the state legislature. In 1808, a law was enacted to provide for the election of the sheriff directly by the citizens of the county, rather than by politicians. This method of election was placed into the South Carolina State Constitution in 1868 and the Office of Sheriff in Greenville County began.

In 2017, Sheriff Will Lewis was suspended by Governor Henry McMaster for misconduct, perjury, and obstruction of justice. These charges came out of a sexual assault lawsuit filed by Lewis' female assistant. Although the sheriff said the relationship was consensual, he settled the claim for an undisclosed sum. Lewis was found guilty in 2019 and sentenced to a year of prison, although he did not begin his sentence until October 2021.

As of 2021, the sheriff of Greenville County is Hobart Lewis. The sheriff's office includes five divisions: Administrative Services, Community Services, Uniform Patrol, Criminal Investigations, and Judicial Services.

As of 2025, 17 officers of the Greenville County Sheriff's Office have been killed in the line of duty.

== Economy ==
CommunityWorks Federal Credit Union was chartered in 2014 to serve the residents of Greenville County. It is sponsored by CommunityWorks, Inc., a nonprofit community-development financial institution, and receives assistance from the United Way of Greenville County and the Hollingsworth Fund.

In 2022, the GDP of Greenville County was $40.6 billion (approx. $72,712 per capita). In chained 2017 dollars, it had a real GDP of $34.3 billion (approx. $61,507 per capita). From 2022 through 2024, the unemployment rate has fluctuated between 2.1-3.3% within the county.

Some of the largest employers in the county include Bon Secours, Charter Communications, GE Vernova, Lockheed Martin, Michelin, Prisma Health, Publix, TD Bank, the United States Postal Service, and Walmart.

Employment and Wage Statistics by Industry in Greenville County, South Carolina
Industry	Employment Counts	Employment Percentage (%)	Average Annual Wage ($)
Accommodation and Food Services	27,980	9.6	23,920
Administrative and Support and Waste Management and Remediation Services	28,877	9.9	42,848
Agriculture, Forestry, Fishing and Hunting	210	0.1	37,960
Arts, Entertainment, and Recreation	5,632	1.9	22,516
Construction	15,291	5.2	77,896
Educational Services	18,844	6.4	51,168
Finance and Insurance	12,361	4.2	80,756
Health Care and Social Assistance	43,180	14.8	67,756
Information	4,850	1.7	73,684
Management of Companies and Enterprises	6,100	2.1	93,548
Manufacturing	31,693	10.8	71,708
Mining, Quarrying, and Oil and Gas Extraction	81	0.0	87,256
Other Services (except Public Administration)	7,077	2.4	46,540
Professional, Scientific, and Technical Services	21,485	7.3	87,308
Public Administration	7,535	2.6	57,616
Real Estate and Rental and Leasing	4,143	1.4	58,500
Retail Trade	30,485	10.4	38,584
Transportation and Warehousing	11,422	3.9	59,436
Utilities	890	0.3	71,760
Wholesale Trade	14,230	4.9	83,096
Total	292,366	100.0%	59,212

== Education ==
School districts serving the county include:

- Anderson School District 2
- Greenville County School District
- Spartanburg County School District 1

Additionally, Greenville County has numerous public charter schools that are free to state residents.

The Greenville County Library System includes 11 libraries that provide meeting spaces, programs, books and other educational resources for county residents. The library system is managed by a board of trustees whose 11 members serve 4-year terms after appointment by the county council. Terms expire at the end of November in odd-numbered years, with half expiring every two years. In October 2023, after some prior controversy, the library board voted to remove all themed displays from its facilities except those pertaining to paid holidays.

== Healthcare ==
The Greenville Memorial Hospital was formerly operated by the municipal government, with Greenville Health System being the operating authority. In 2016, Prisma Health began leasing the hospital and directly operating. The GHA is the portion of the Greenville Health System that still existed after the hospital transitioned into being operated by Prisma. The Greenville Health Authority (GHA) is the owner of the hospital facilities operated by Prisma. Members of the South Carolina Legislature select a majority of the seats of the board of directors of the GHA.

== Communities ==
In the past, Greenville County was partitioned into townships. Their former names and boundaries were used for United States census counting purposes and census documentation through 1960, after which census counting divisions were used. The 2010 Census lists six cities and 16 census designated places that are fully or partially within Greenville County.

=== Cities ===
- Fountain Inn (partly in Laurens County)
- Greenville (county seat and largest community)
- Greer (partly in Spartanburg County)
- Mauldin
- Simpsonville
- Travelers Rest

=== Census-designated places ===
- Berea
- Caesars Head
- City View
- Conestee
- Dunean
- Five Forks
- Gantt
- Golden Grove
- Judson
- Parker
- Piedmont (partly in Anderson County)
- Sans Souci
- Slater-Marietta
- Taylors
- The Cliffs Valley
- Tigerville
- Wade Hampton
- Ware Place
- Welcome

=== Other unincorporated communities ===
- Altamont
- Batesville
- Cleveland
- Gowensville

== See also ==
- List of counties in South Carolina
- National Register of Historic Places listings in Greenville County, South Carolina
