= Mauldin, South Carolina =

Mauldin
- City
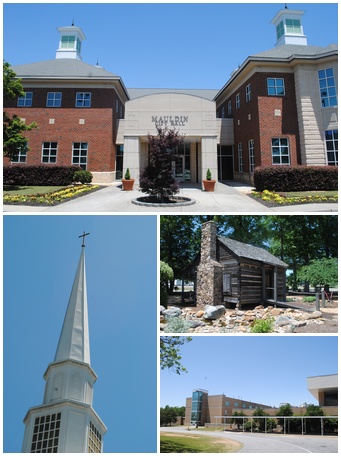
- Top, left to right: Mauldin City Hall, Mauldin Methodist Church, Mauldin Cultural Center, Mauldin High School

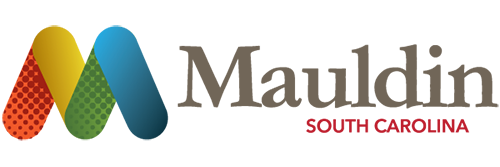
- Flag Seal
- Motto: "Explore Our Thriving Community"
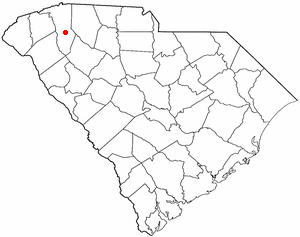
- Location in South Carolina
- Coordinates: 34°45′15″N 82°19′14″W
- Country: United States
- State: South Carolina
- County: Greenville
- Founded: 1784
- Chartered (town): December 24, 1890
- Chartered (city): 1969
- Named for: William L. Mauldin

Area
  - City: 12.13 sq mi (31.42 km^{2})
  - Land: 12.07 sq mi (31.26 km^{2})
  - Water: 0.066 sq mi (0.17 km^{2}) 0.49%
- Elevation: 906 ft (276 m)

Population (2020)
  - City: 24,724
  - Density: 2,050/sq mi (791/km^{2})
  - Urban: 159,506 (US: 227th)
  - Urban density: 1,576/sq mi (608.5/km^{2})
- Time zone: UTC−5 (Eastern (EST))
  - Summer (DST): UTC−4 (EDT)
- ZIP code: 29662
- Area codes: 864, 821
- FIPS code: 45-45115
- GNIS feature ID: 2405038
- Website: www.cityofmauldin.org

Mauldin is a city in Greenville County, South Carolina, United States. The population was 24,724 at the 2020 census, making it the 19th-most populous city in South Carolina. It is located in the Greenville-Anderson-Greer, SC Metropolitan Statistical Area.

== History ==
Benjamin Griffith was awarded the first land grant in what is now called Mauldin in 1784. The name of Mauldin was given to the town almost accidentally in 1885 thanks to South Carolina's lieutenant governor, W. L. Mauldin. The train station was called "Mauldin" because the lieutenant governor had assisted in getting the Greenville and Laurens Railroad to come through the village. Over time, the entire area took the name of Mauldin.

== Geography ==
Mauldin is located south of the center of Greenville County, between the city of Greenville to the northwest and Simpsonville to the southeast. According to the United States Census Bureau, the city has a total area of 12.13 square miles (31.4 km^{2}), of which 12.07 square miles (31.3 km^{2}) is land and 0.06 square miles (0.16 km^{2}) (0.49%) is water.

U.S. Route 276 (Main Street) passes through the center of Mauldin, leading northwest 8 miles (13 km) to the center of Greenville and southeast 5 miles (8 km) to Simpsonville. Interstate 385 runs through the eastern side of Mauldin, leading north to Interstate 85 on the east side of Greenville. I-385 connects with Interstate 185 on the southern edge of Mauldin, and I-185 continues west and northwest 13 miles (21 km) to join I-85 on the southwest side of Greenville. From its interchange with I-185, I-385 leads southeast 30 miles (48 km) to Interstate 26 near Clinton.

During the Civil War, many of Mauldin's citizens left to fight, and the city virtually dried up. It never completely recovered until after World War II when the community was incorporated as a town (1960).

== Demographics ==
Historical population
Census	Pop.	Note	%±
1960	1,462		—
1970	3,797		159.7%
1980	8,143		114.5%
1990	11,587		42.3%
2000	15,224		31.4%
2010	22,889		50.3%
2020	24,724		8.0%
2025 (est.)	31,465	▲	27.3%
U.S. Decennial Census; 2020

=== 2020 census ===
As of the 2020 census, Mauldin had a population of 24,724 and 6,339 families residing in the city. The median age was 39.2 years. 22.1% of residents were under the age of 18 and 16.9% of residents were 65 years of age or older. For every 100 females there were 87.8 males, and for every 100 females age 18 and over there were 84.0 males age 18 and over.

100.0% of residents lived in urban areas, while 0.0% lived in rural areas.

There were 10,272 households in Mauldin, of which 30.6% had children under the age of 18 living in them. Of all households, 44.4% were married-couple households, 17.5% were households with a male householder and no spouse or partner present, and 33.0% were households with a female householder and no spouse or partner present. About 29.6% of all households were made up of individuals and 10.3% had someone living alone who was 65 years of age or older.

There were 10,808 housing units, of which 5.0% were vacant. The homeowner vacancy rate was 1.3% and the rental vacancy rate was 7.5%.

Racial composition as of the 2020 census
Race	Number	Percent
White	14,978	60.6%
Black or African American	5,889	23.8%
American Indian and Alaska Native	62	0.3%
Asian	808	3.3%
Native Hawaiian and Other Pacific Islander	42	0.2%
Some other race	989	4.0%
Two or more races	1,956	7.9%
Hispanic or Latino (of any race)	2,357	9.5%

=== 2000 census ===
At the 2000 census, there were 15,224 people, 6,131 households, and 4,242 families residing in the city. The population density was 1,767.1 inhabitants per square mile (682.3/km^{2}). There were 6,500 housing units at an average density of 754.5 per square mile (291.3/km^{2}). The racial makeup of the city was 74.25% White, 20.82% African American, 0.30% Native American, 2.24% Asian, 0.11% Pacific Islander, 0.98% from other races, and 1.31% from two or more races. Hispanic or Latino of any race were 2.73% of the population.

There were 6,131 households, out of which 33.9% had children under the age of 18 living with them, 55.8% were married couples living together, 10.4% had a female householder with no husband present and 30.8% were non-families. 26.0% of all households were made up of individuals, and 6.2% had someone living alone who was 65 years of age or older. The average household size was 2.46 and the average family size was 2.97.

In the city, the population was spread out, with 25.0% under the age of 18, 8.1% from 18 to 24, 33.5% from 25 to 44, 24.1% from 45 to 64, and 9.3% who were 65 years of age or older. The median age was 35 years. For every 100 females, there were 93.2 males. For every 100 females age 18 and over, there were 91.0 males.

The median income for a household in the city was $51,657, and the median income for a family was $61,817. Males had a median income of $41,047 versus $29,985 for females. The per capita income for the city was $24,750. About 3.2% of families and 4.4% of the population were below the poverty line, including 6.7% of those under age 18 and 9.2% of those age 65 or over.

== Economy ==
The supermarket chain BI-LO was founded in Mauldin and had its headquarters there until 2011. In 2024, BridgeWay Station, a 400,000 square foot mixed-use development, opened.

The Mauldin Cultural Center, located in the former Mauldin School building on East Butler Road, serves as a center for arts, entertainment, and community events in Mauldin, South Carolina. Operated by the City of Mauldin, the facility includes an indoor theater and outdoor amphitheater and hosts theatrical productions, concerts, festivals, arts education programs, and other public events.

The Mauldin Theatre Company (MTC), based at the Cultural Center, produces musicals, plays, and educational theatre programming. Under the artistic direction of Kristofer Parker, the company has expanded its programming to include mainstage productions, youth theatre, and outdoor performances. The company celebrated its tenth season in 2026–2027, featuring productions of Pippin, Our Town, Little Women, and a collaboration with Greenville Theatre on Jesus Christ Superstar.

Notable productions have included The Hunchback of Notre Dame (2023), A Chorus Line (2024), Rent (2025), and Pippin (2026). In October 2026, the company presented a free outdoor production of Rock of Ages at the Mauldin Cultural Center Amphitheater, drawing more than 1,000 attendees across three performances.

== Education ==
Public education in Mauldin is administered by Greenville County School District. The district operates Mauldin High School.

Mauldin has a public library, a branch of the Greenville County Library System.

== Notable people ==
- Haven Bruce, soccer player
- Justin Dean, professional baseball player
- Kevin Garnett, Olympian and professional basketball player
- Orlando Jones, actor
- Al Yeargin, professional baseball player

== See also ==
- List of municipalities in South Carolina
