= Greenville–Spartanburg International Airport =

Airport in South Carolina, United States

Greenville–Spartanburg International Airport Roger Milliken Field

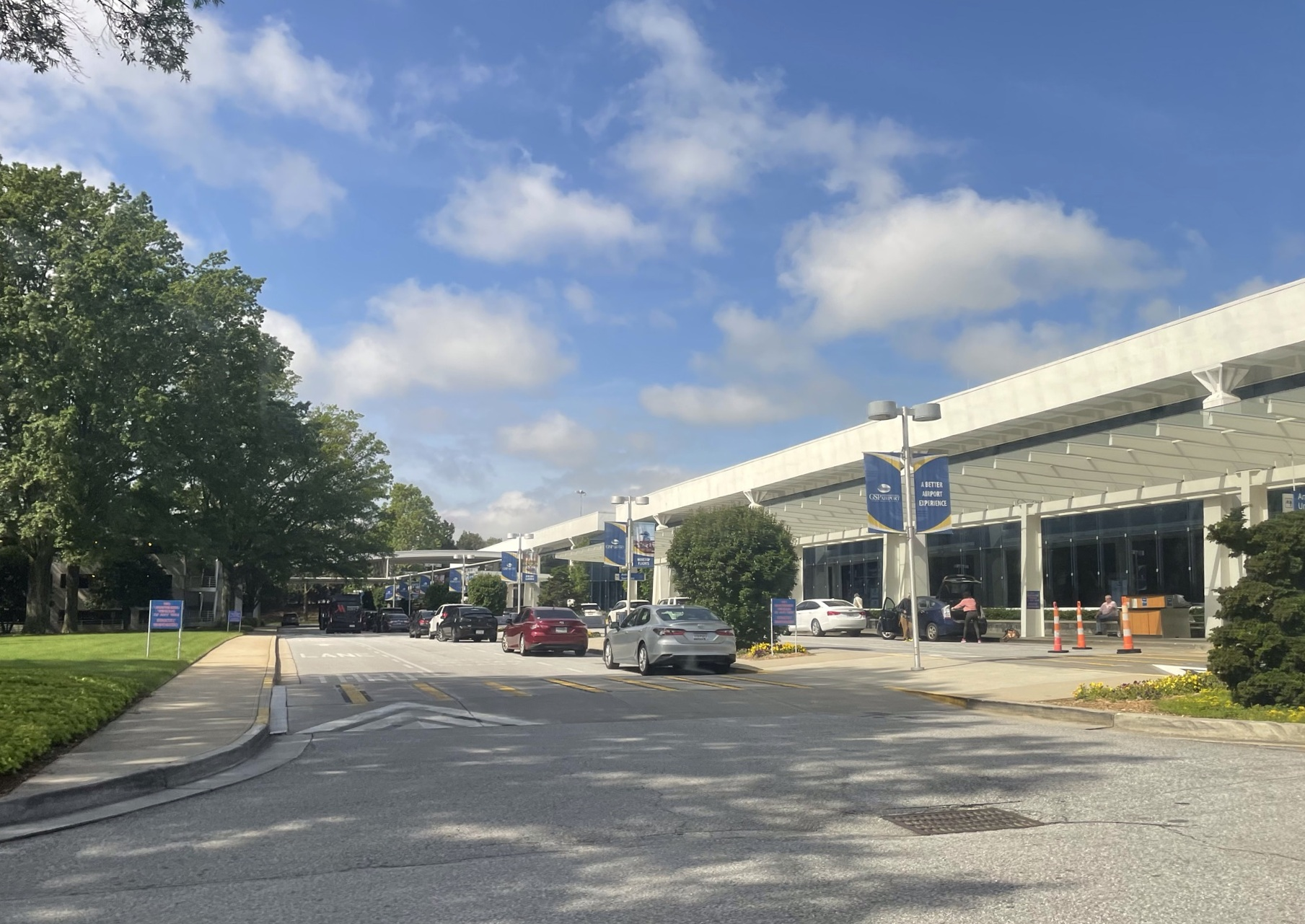
- IATA: GSP; ICAO: KGSP; FAA LID: GSP

Summary
- Airport type: Public
- Owner: Greenville–Spartanburg; Airport District
- Operator: Greenville–Spartanburg; Airport Commission
- Serves: Upstate South Carolina
- Location: near Greer, South Carolina
- Opened: October 15, 1962; 64 years ago
- Elevation AMSL: 964 ft (294 m)
- Coordinates: 34°53′44″N 082°13′08″W
- Website: www.gspairport.com

Maps
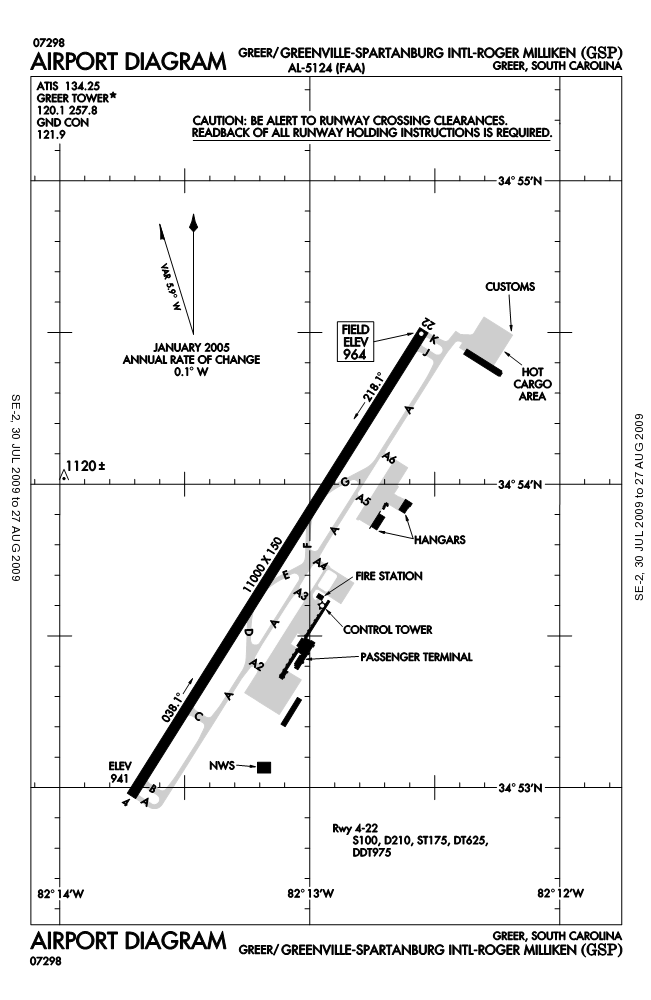
- FAA airport diagram
- Interactive map of Greenville–Spartanburg International Airport

Runways
Direction	Length		Surface
Direction	ft	m	Surface
4/22	11,001	3,353	Asphalt/concrete

Statistics (2025)
- Aircraft operations (2024): 59,545
- Based aircraft (2024): 33
- Passengers: 3,043,621 ▲5.70%
- Cargo handled (tons): 64,593
- Source: Federal Aviation Administration

Greenville–Spartanburg International Airport (IATA: GSP, ICAO: KGSP, FAA LID: GSP) – also known as Roger Milliken Field – is near Greer, South Carolina, United States, midway between Greenville and Spartanburg, the major cities of the Upstate region of South Carolina. The airport is the third-busiest airport in South Carolina, after Charleston International Airport, and Myrtle Beach International Airport with over 3.04 million passengers in 2025, the most in its history.

The Federal Aviation Administration (FAA) National Plan of Integrated Airport Systems for 2017–2021 categorized it as a small-hub primary commercial service facility.

== History ==
Before construction of the Greenville–Spartanburg International Airport (GSP), each city had its own airport and competed for airline service. In the mid-1950s Roger Milliken, a textile heir, industrialist, and businessman (CEO of Milliken & Company), worked with other upstate business leaders to get a shared airport for the two cities. In 1958, a proposal for an airport between the two cities was presented to the legislative delegation for the two counties, which approved the construction and the creation of an airport commission, headed by Milliken.

GSP opened on October 15, 1962, replacing Greenville Downtown Airport as the primary airline destination in the region. Delta Air Lines, Eastern Air Lines, and Southern Airways had all been serving both Greenville and Spartanburg separately; however only Eastern and Southern moved to the new GSP airport, while Delta discontinued their service. In the 1980s, GSP expanded its terminal and cargo facilities, and the runway was lengthened twice in the 1990s. In 2004, the airfield was named for Milliken.

Having been served by legacy carriers, with large hubs in nearby Atlanta and Charlotte, GSP had long been plagued with high fares. The arrival of low-cost carriers reduced fares and increased passenger figures. Allegiant Air began flights to Florida in 2006, and in 2011 Southwest Airlines began service to five cities.

Local officials attribute Southwest's presence to an unprecedented 38% growth in passenger figures between 2010 and 2011. In 2011, GSP received an ANNIE Award from Airline and Airport News & Analysis for being the fastest-growing small airport in the United States. In 2012 the U.S. Department of Transportation's Bureau of Travel Statistics reported that average fares from GSP decreased by 14%; the largest decrease in the country.

== Facilities ==
The airport covers 3,500 acres (1,400 ha) and has one runway, 4/22, 11,001 ft × 150 ft (3,353 m × 46 m) asphalt/concrete.

The airport is mostly in Spartanburg County with a portion in Greenville County. It is in an unincorporated area, adjacent to sections of Greer.

The airport has one terminal building with two concourses: Concourse A (gates A1–A9), and Concourse B (gates B1–B4). The check-in level is the same for all passengers. In 2012 the airport embarked on a four-year, $102 million terminal improvement program which would modernize the terminal and improve passenger flow, as well as prepare for future expansion. Future planning includes several options, i.e., the expansion of the terminal by 300% of its current capacity and the possibility of the addition of a second runway, parallel to the existing one.

Concourse A is used by American, Southwest, Breeze Airways, Avelo Airlines and United. Allegiant Air and Delta use Concourse B.

The airport can handle up to 250 passengers per hour through immigration and customs checkpoints.

FedEx has a major package facility on the north end of the airport, and BMW has a facility which supports easy transfer of arriving parts to the company's manufacturing facility, three miles to the east.

In July 2016, GSP airport and Senator International of Germany announced that a regularly scheduled twice-weekly cargo service would start in November 2016 between GSP airport and Munich, Germany. The cargo service would be the first scheduled international route for the airport. Senator International started the international cargo service to Germany in November 2016, operated by Air Atlanta Icelandic with a Boeing 747-400F aircraft, to both Munich and Frankfurt–Hahn Airport.

== Airlines and destinations ==
=== Passenger ===
GSP is serviced by seven passenger airlines and their regional affiliates. All service is domestic.

Airlines	Destinations	Refs
Allegiant Air	Fort Lauderdale, Orlando/Sanford, St. Petersburg/Clearwater, Sarasota	
American Airlines	Charlotte, Dallas/Fort Worth	
American Eagle	Charlotte, Chicago–O'Hare, Dallas/Fort Worth, Miami, New York–LaGuardia, Philadelphia, Washington–National	
Avelo Airlines	Seasonal: New Haven	
Breeze Airways	Columbus–Glenn, Fort Lauderdale, Providence, Tampa; Seasonal: Cincinnati, Fort Myers, Hartford, Los Angeles, Orlando, Pittsburgh, West Palm Beach (begins December 18, 2026)	
Delta Air Lines	Atlanta, Detroit	
Delta Connection	Detroit, New York–LaGuardia	
Southwest Airlines	Baltimore, Nashville; Seasonal: Denver	
United Airlines	Houston–Intercontinental; Seasonal: Chicago–O'Hare	
United Express	Chicago–O'Hare, Denver, Houston–Intercontinental, Newark, Washington–Dulles	

Destinations map
Destinations from Greenville-Spartanburg International Airport
Red = Year-round destination
Green = Seasonal destination
Blue = Future destination

=== Cargo ===
Airlines	Destinations
Air Atlanta Icelandic	Hahn, Munich, Querétaro
Amerijet International	Miami
Atlas Air	Hahn
FedEx Express	Indianapolis, Memphis
FedEx Feeder	Greensboro
Maersk Air Cargo	Cologne, Seoul–Incheon, Shenyang
UPS Airlines	Charleston (SC), Columbia (SC), Louisville, Miami, Raleigh/Durham; Seasonal: Hartford
Western Global Airlines	Fort Myers

== Statistics ==
=== Top destinations ===
Busiest domestic routes from GSP (January 2025 – December 2025)
Rank	City	Passengers	Carriers
1	(Georgia (U.S. state)) Atlanta, Georgia	332,080	Delta, Southwest
2	Charlotte, North Carolina	188,920	American
3	Dallas/Fort Worth, Texas	129,730	American
4	(New York (state)) New York–LaGuardia, New York	107,120	American, Delta
5	Chicago–O'Hare, Illinois	105,710	American, United
6	Baltimore, Maryland	68,460	Southwest
7	Detroit, Michigan	58,210	Delta
8	Philadelphia, Pennsylvania	49,540	American
9	Washington-National, Virginia	48,310	American
10	Nashville, Tennessee	44,710	Southwest

Airline Market Shares (January 2025 – December 2025)
Rank	Airline	Passengers	Market Share
1	Delta	681,000	22.90%
2	PSA	376,000	12.65%
3	Southwest	299,000	10.05%
4	American	272,000	9.14%
5	Envoy	211,000	7.08%
-	Other	1,135,000	38.17%

=== Annual traffic ===
Annual passenger traffic (enplaned + deplaned) at GSP, CY 1984 – present
Year	Passengers	Year	Passengers	Year	Passengers	Year	Passengers	Year	Passengers
1984	735,961	1994	1,560,042	2004	1,575,117	2014	1,897,264	2024	2,880,480
1985	854,092	1995	1,322,540	2005	1,792,597	2015	1,940,602	2025	3,043,621
1986	937,863	1996	1,428,223	2006	1,528,979	2016	2,011,047	2026	
1987	1,105,752	1997	1,450,174	2007	1,555,077	2017	2,130,885	2027	
1988	1,139,640	1998	1,424,669	2008	1,415,688	2018	2,317,984	2028	
1989	1,110,314	1999	1,518,561	2009	1,250,766	2019	2,612,236	2029	
1990	1,184,580	2000	1,590,786	2010	1,301,744	2020	1,065,499	2030	
1991	1,055,823	2001	1,412,567	2011	1,787,161	2021	1,799,877	2031	
1992	1,097,287	2002	1,386,828	2012	1,901,032	2022	2,187,884	2032	
1993	1,171,826	2003	1,350,648	2013	1,866,826	2023	2,563,853	2033	

== Gallery ==
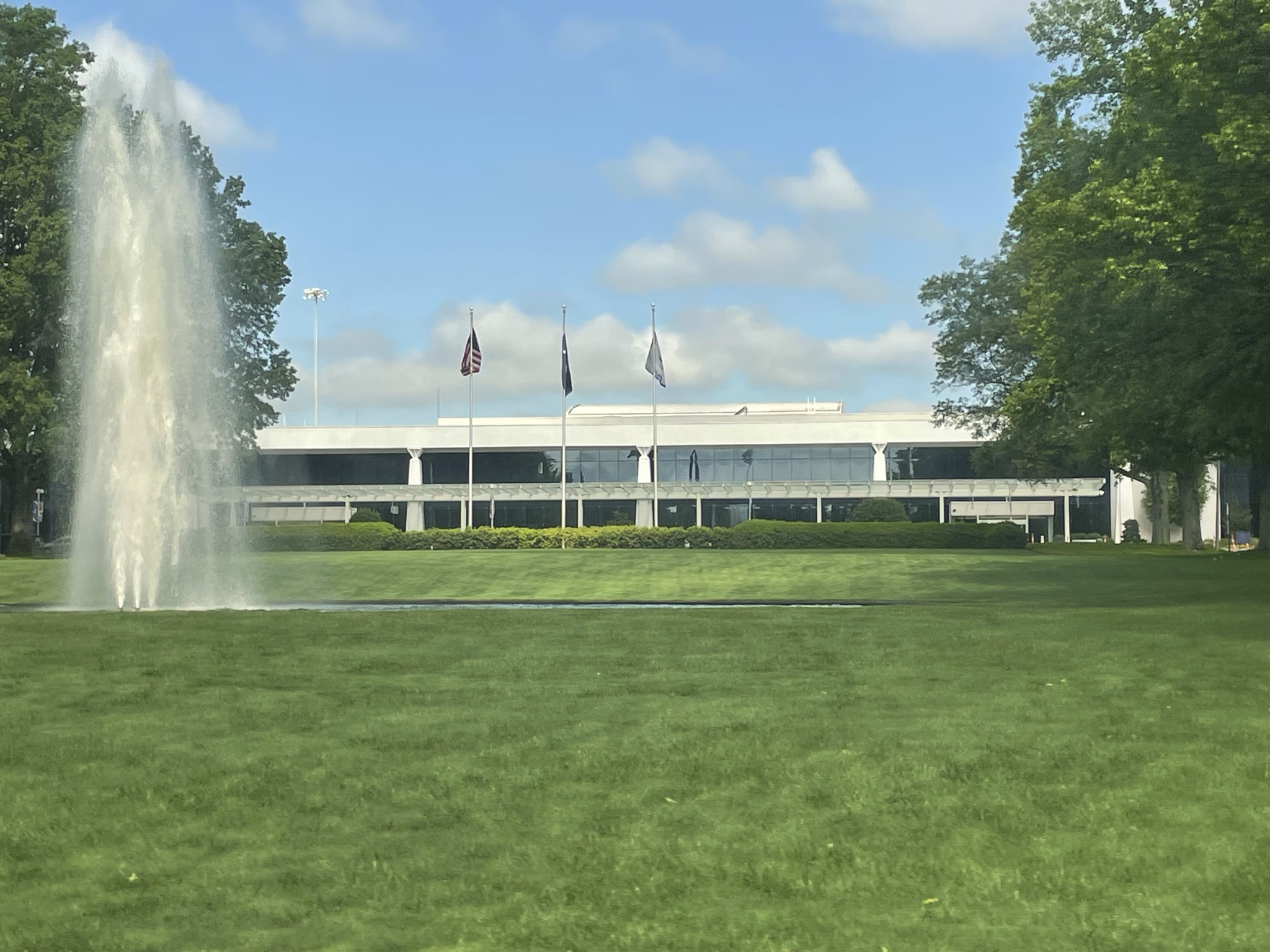
Front of the airport

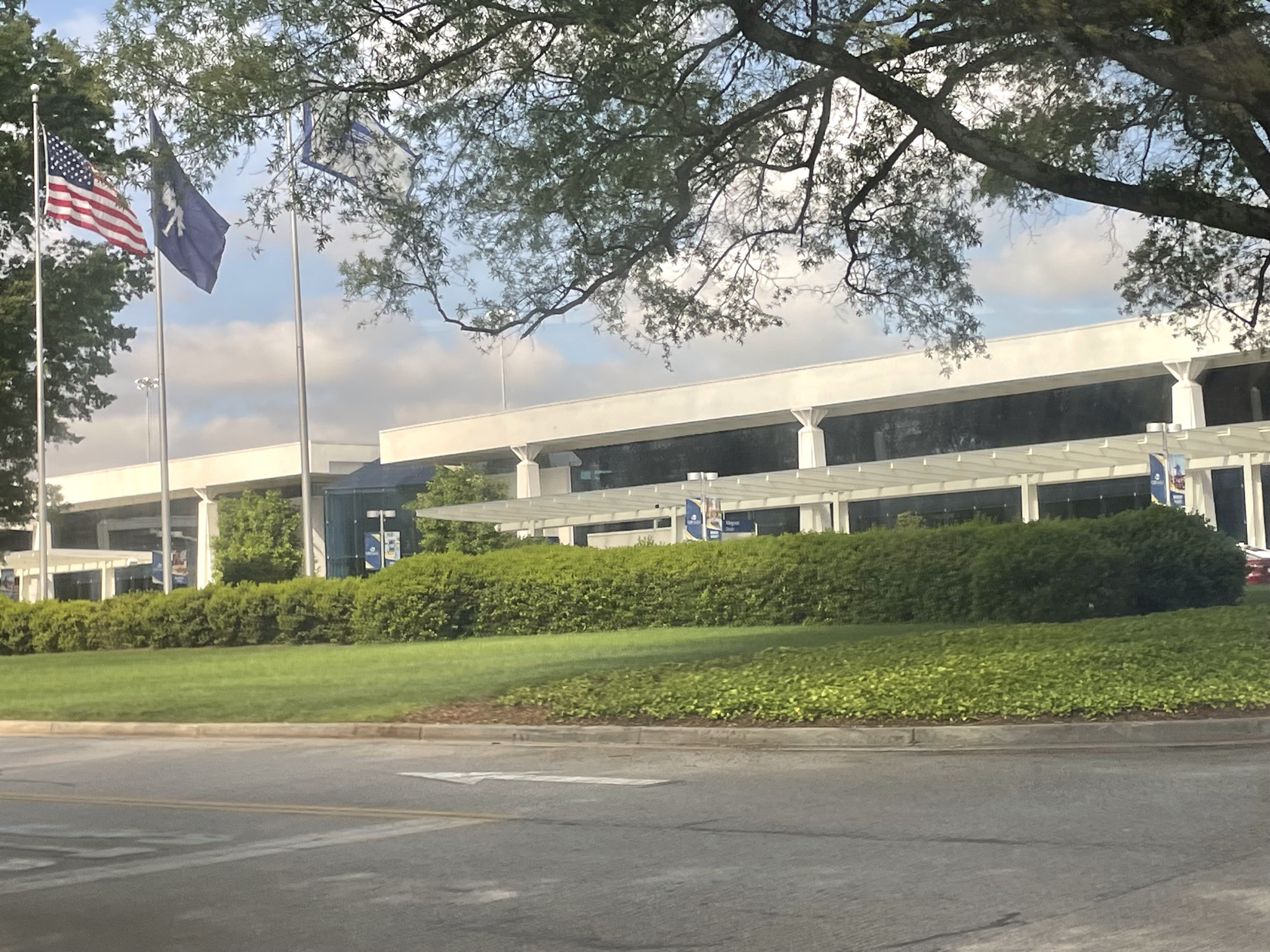
Front entrance

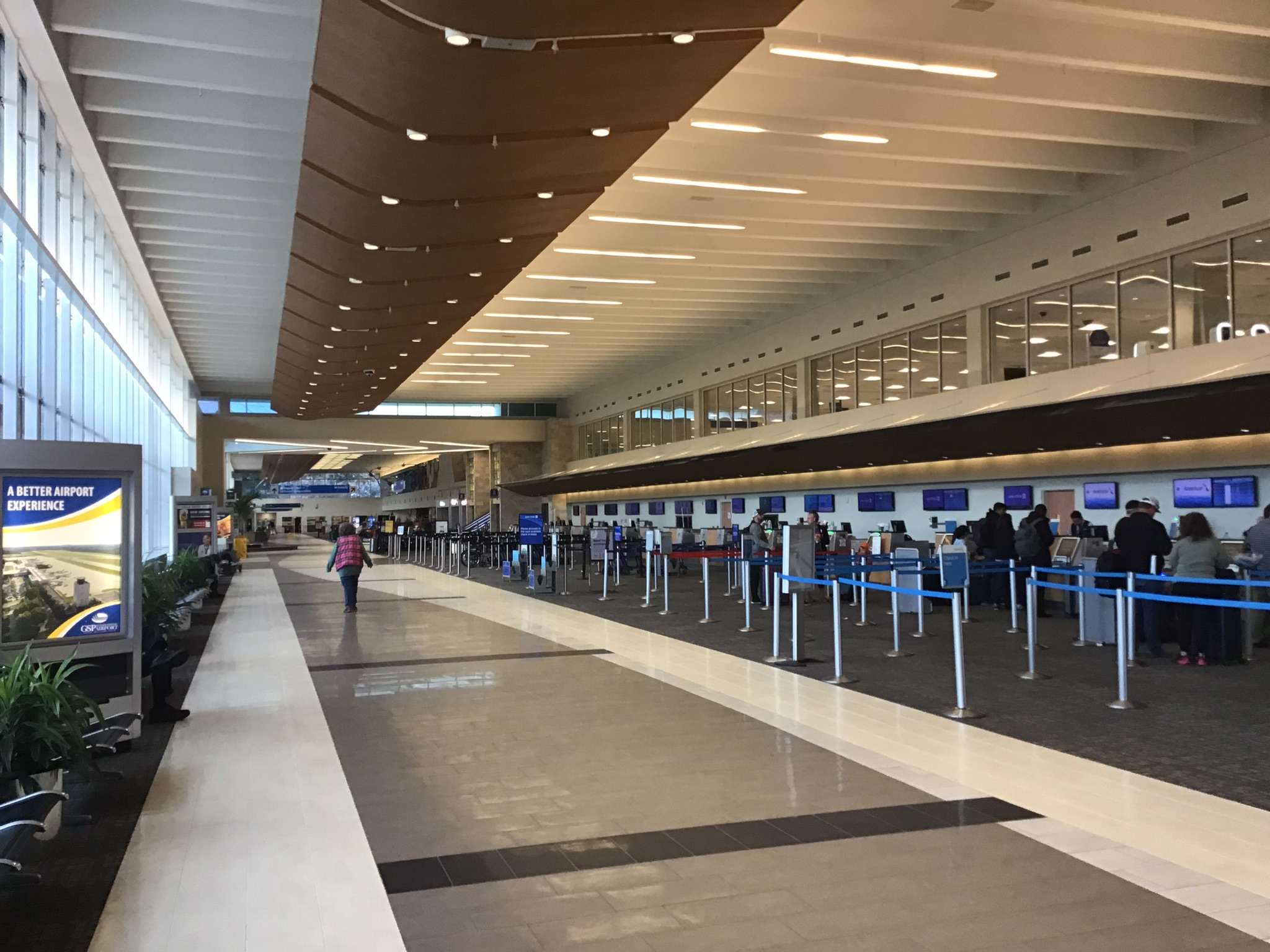
Ticket counters near entrance

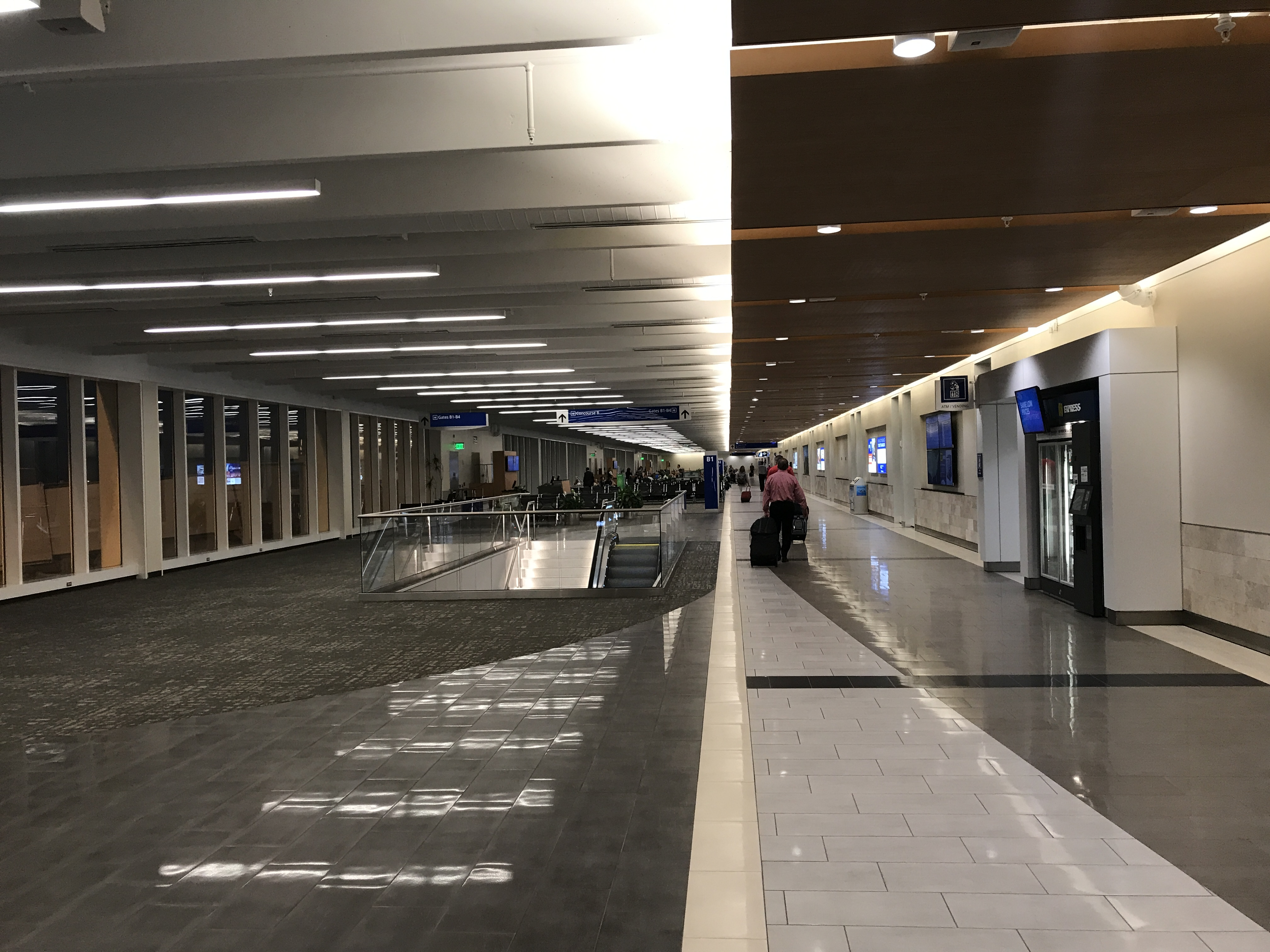
Interior of the terminal

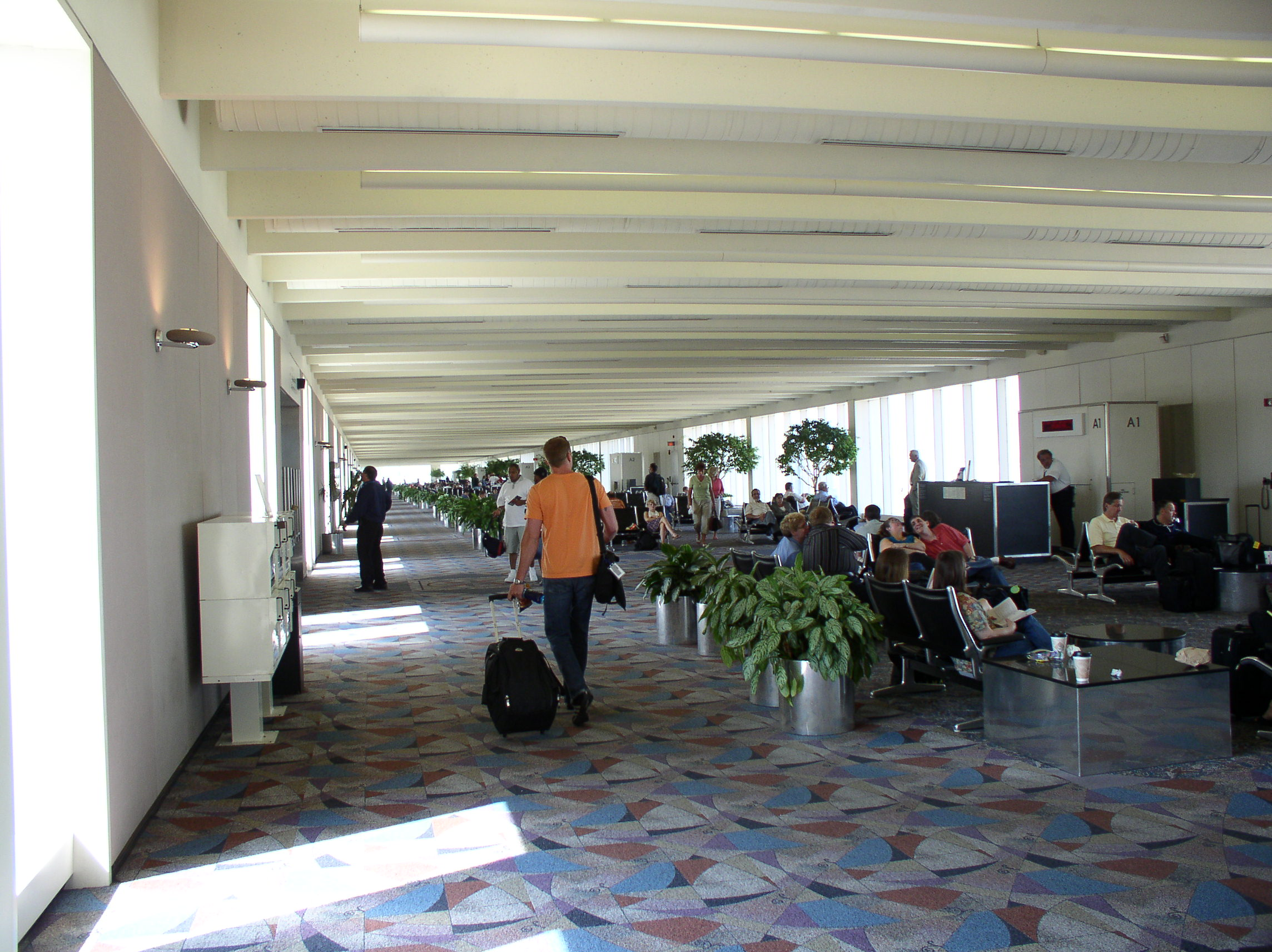
Concourse A

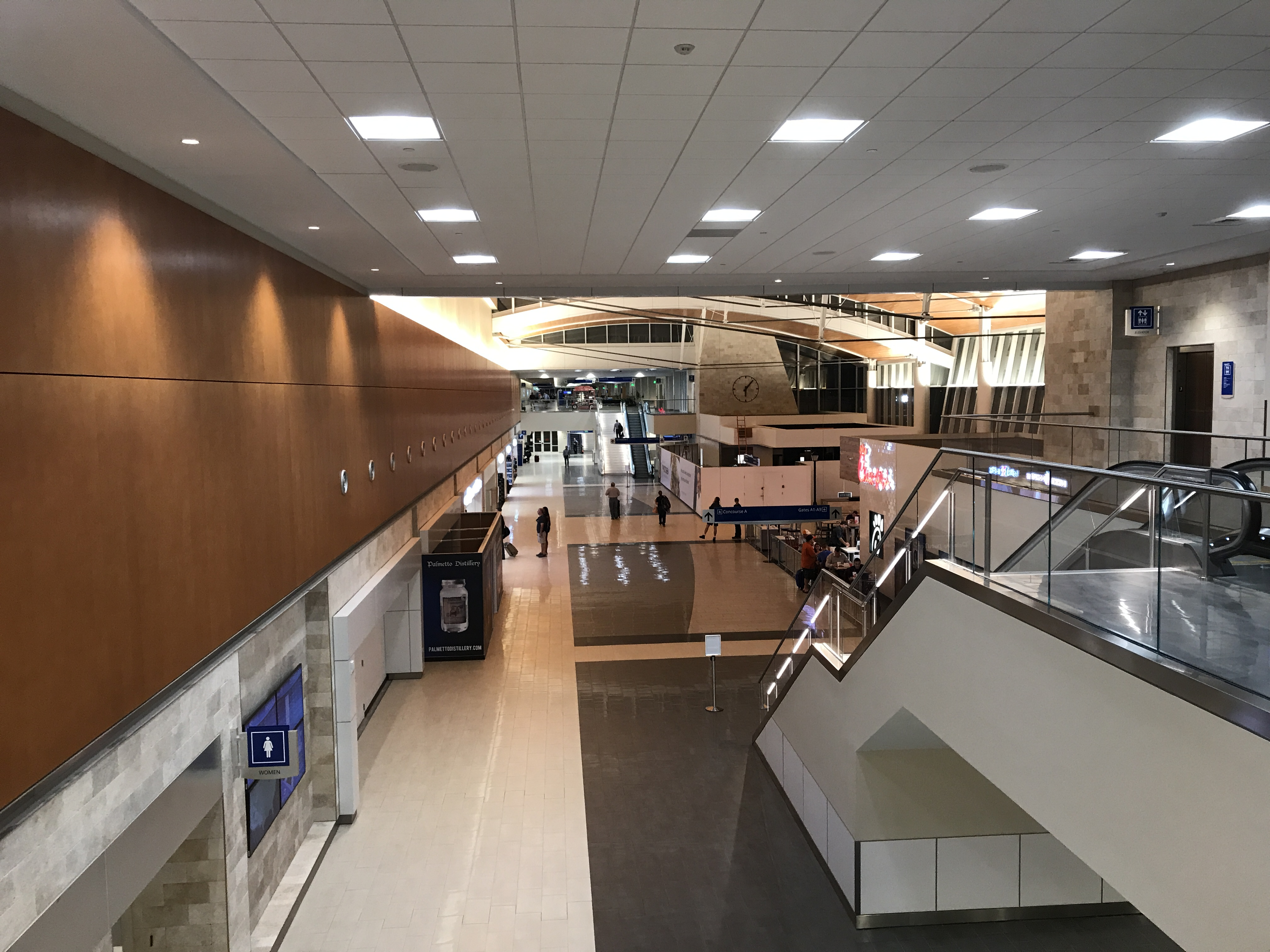
View from Concourse B overlooking central area post-security

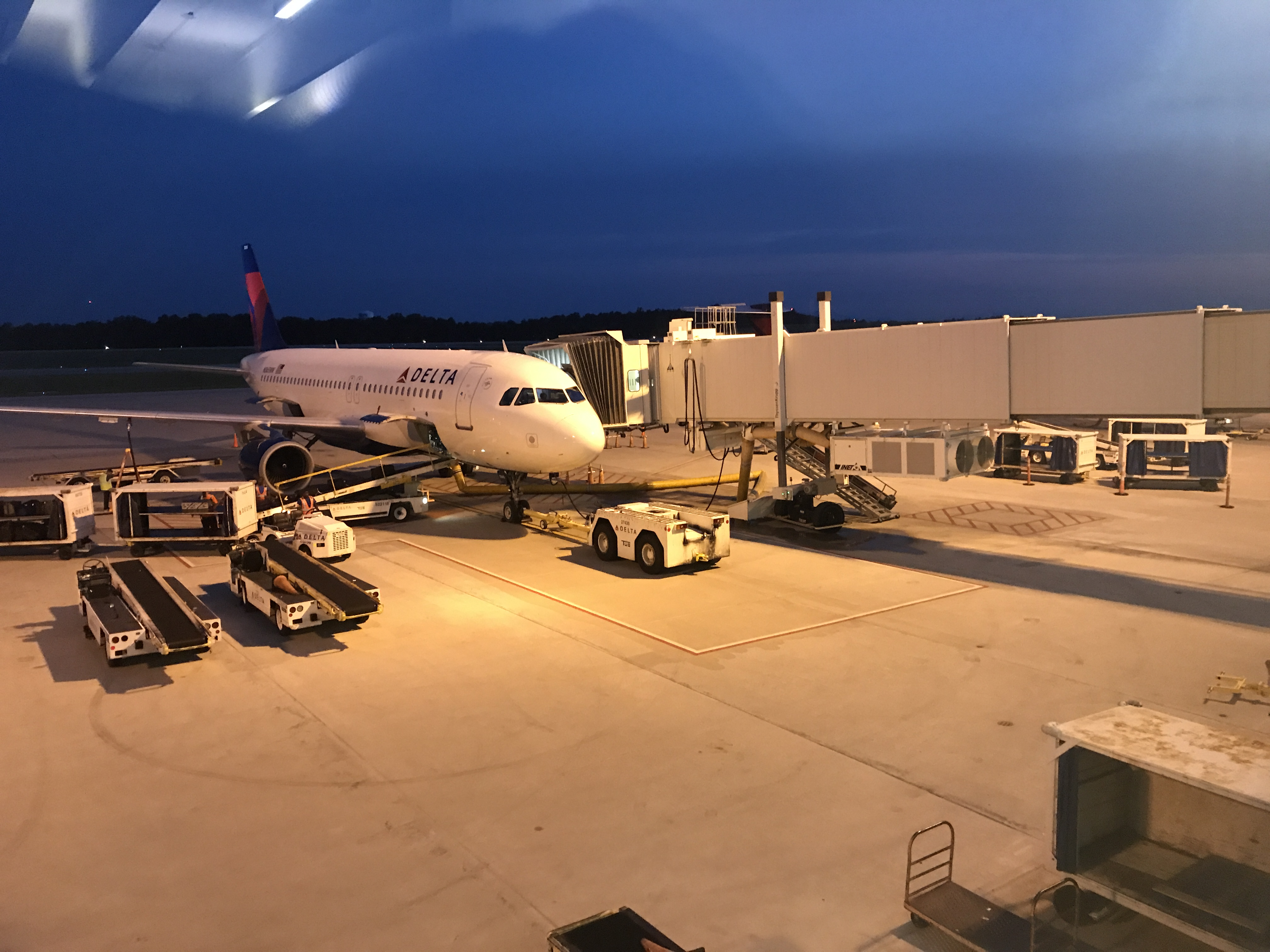
Delta Air Lines A320 at Gate B3

== See also ==
- List of airports in South Carolina
