= Josh Boone =

Josh Boone may refer to:

- Josh Boone (basketball) (born 1984), American professional basketball player
- Josh Boone (director) (born 1979), American film director
- Josh Boone (soccer) (born 1992), American professional soccer player
