= Greenville, South Carolina =

Greenville
- City
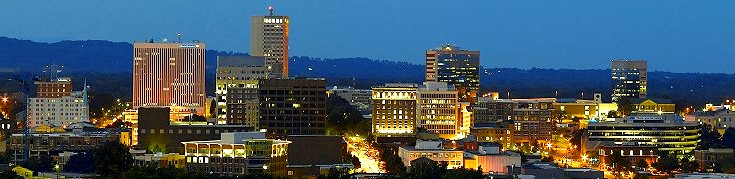
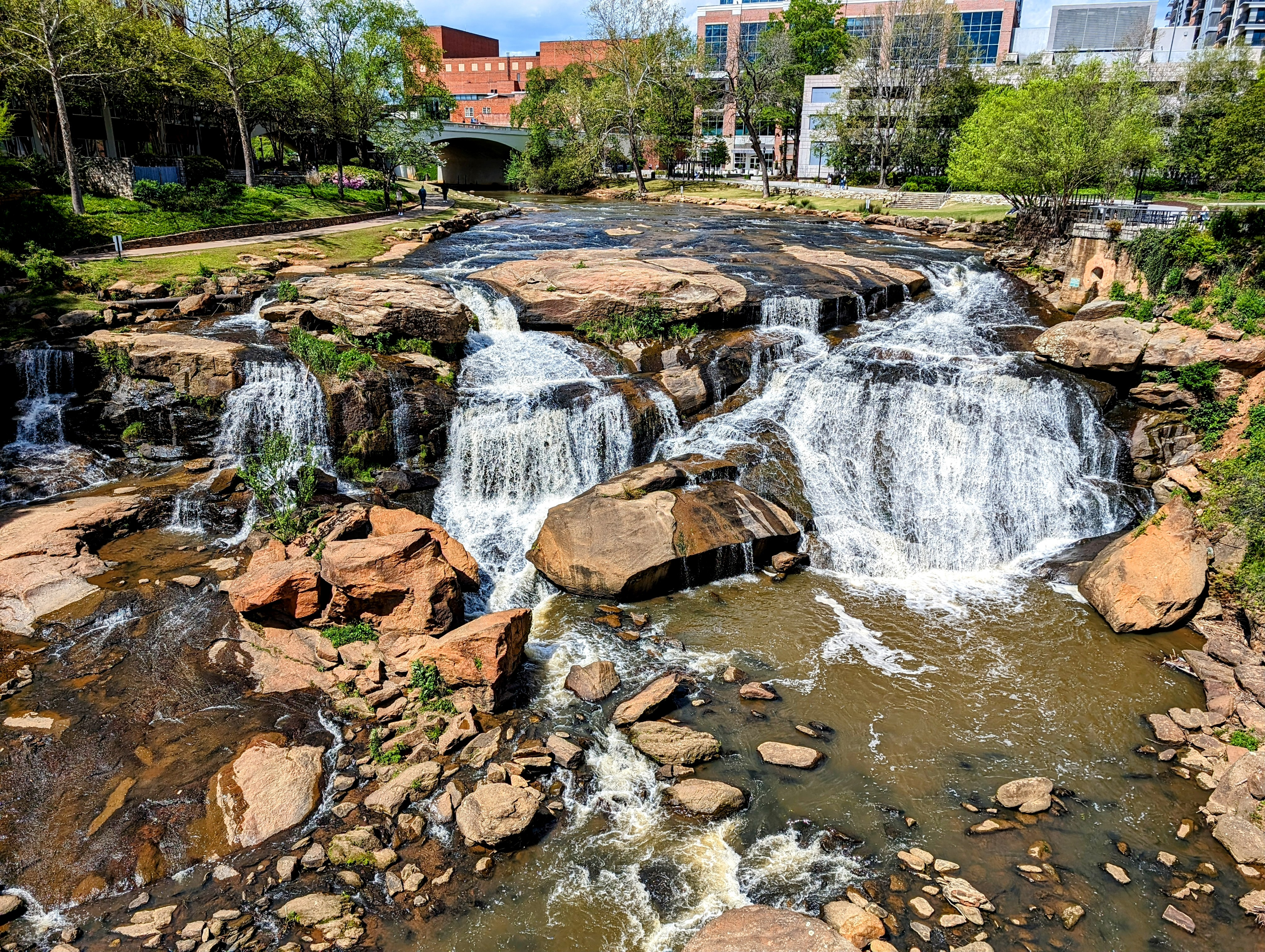
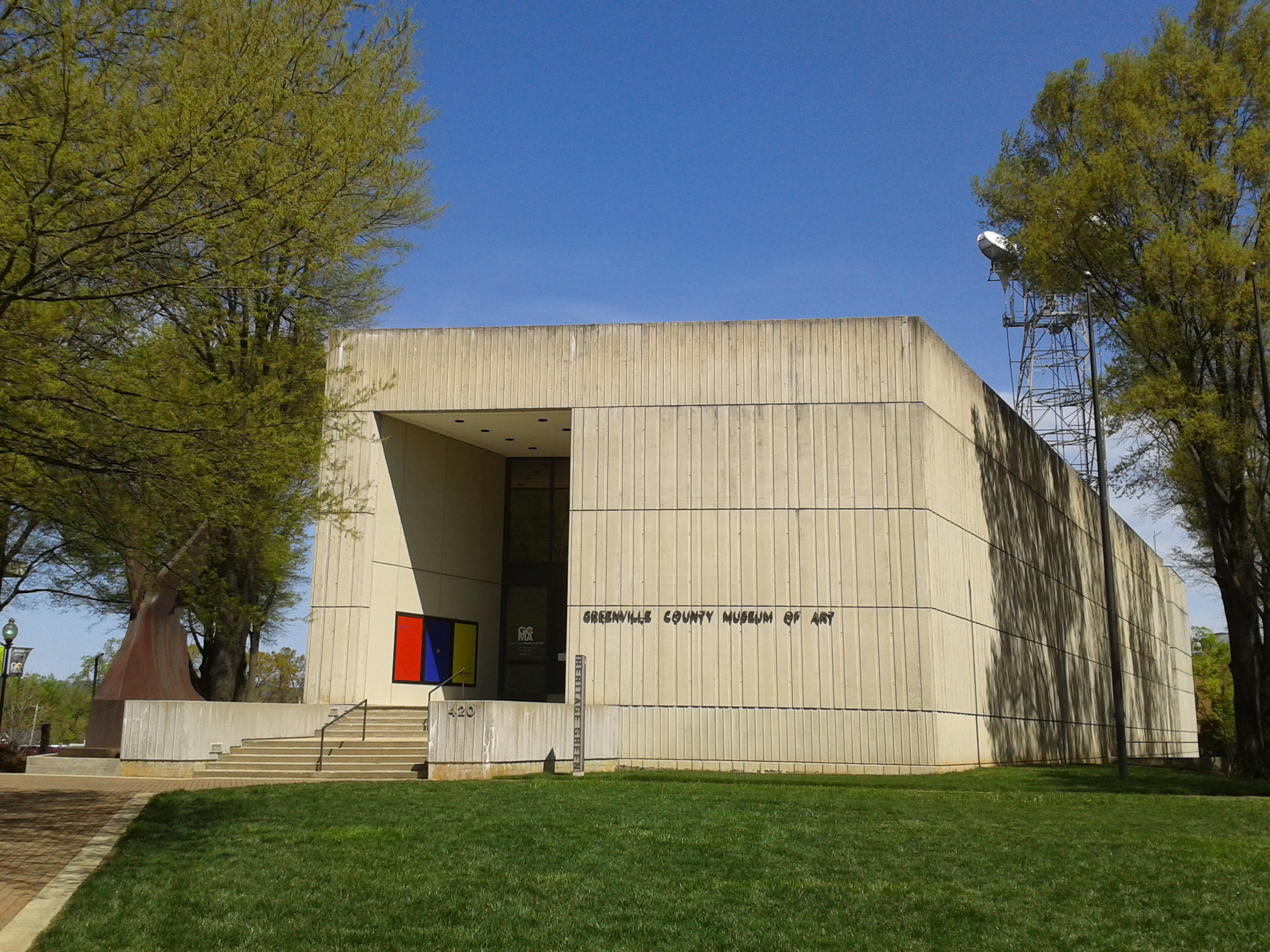
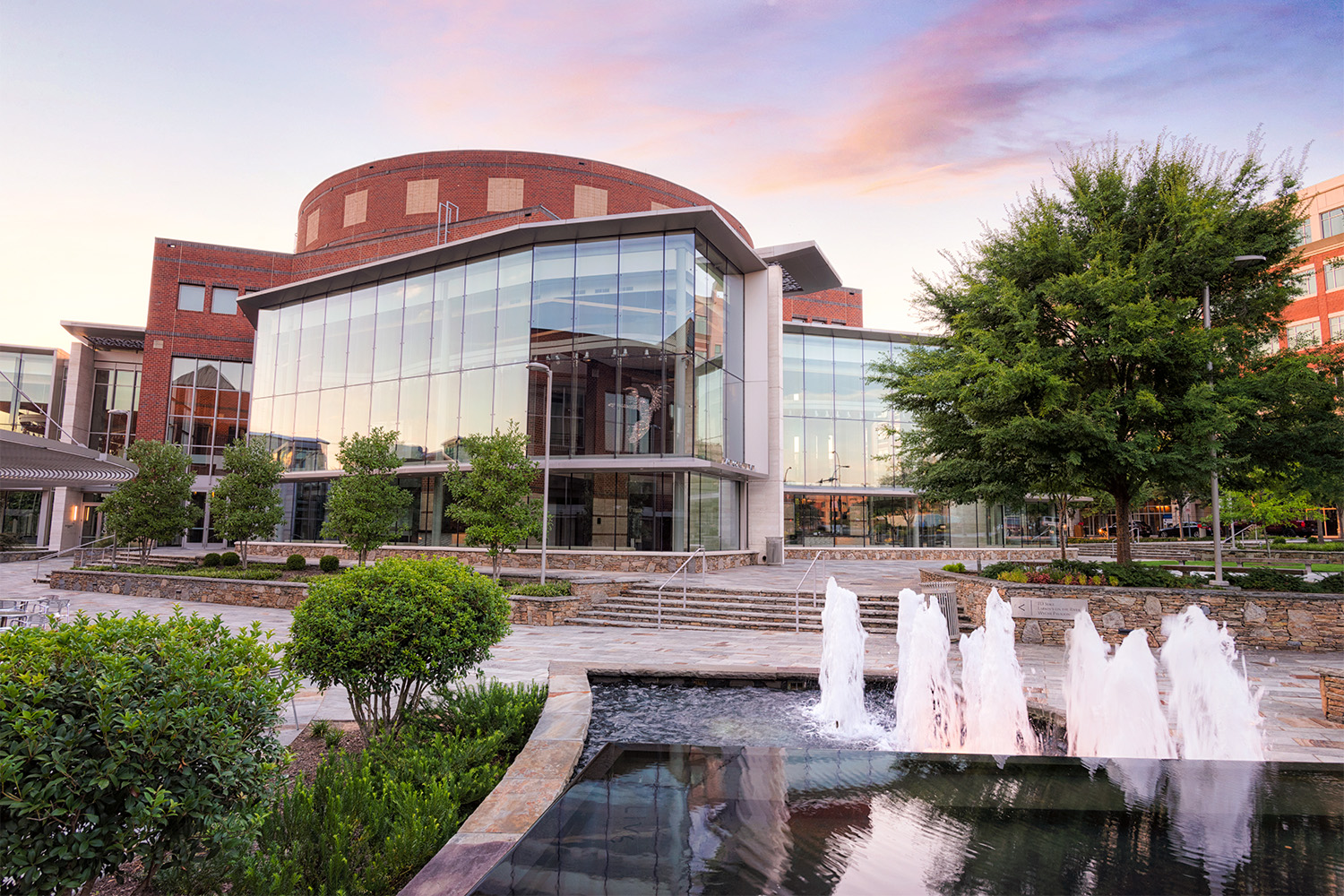
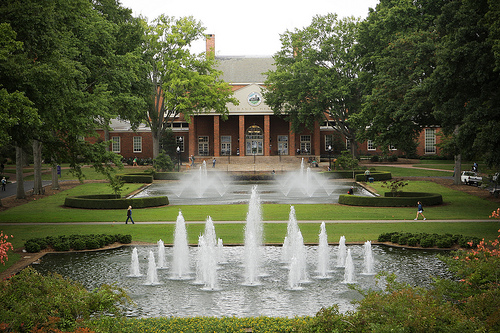
- Downtown Greenville Falls Park on the Reedy Greenville County Museum of Art Peace Center Furman University

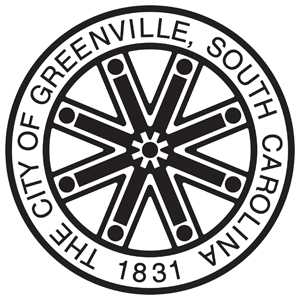
- Seal Logo
- Nicknames: G-Vegas/Green Vegas, GVL
- Interactive map of Greenville
- Location within South Carolina Location within the United States
- Coordinates: 34°51′40″N 82°24′48″W
- Country: United States
- State: South Carolina
- County: Greenville
- Incorporated (as a village): December 17, 1831; 194 years ago
- Named for: Nathanael Greene

Government
  - Type: Council–manager
  - Mayor: Knox H. White (R)
  - City manager: Shannon Lavrin

Area
  - City: 30.02 sq mi (77.76 km^{2})
  - Land: 29.80 sq mi (77.17 km^{2})
  - Water: 0.22 sq mi (0.58 km^{2})
- Elevation: 955 ft (291 m)

Population (2020)
  - City: 70,720
  - Rank: SC: 6th
  - Density: 2,373.4/sq mi (916.37/km^{2})
  - Urban: 408,626 (US: 109th) (Greenville/Mauldin Urbanized Area Combined 568,132)
  - Urban density: 1,477/sq mi (570.3/km^{2})
  - Metro: 1,014,100 (Greenville-Anderson-Greer MSA)
- Demonym: Greenvillian
- Time zone: UTC−5 (EST)
  - Summer (DST): UTC−4 (EDT)
- ZIP Codes: 29601–29617
- Area codes: 864, 821
- FIPS code: 45-30850
- GNIS feature ID: 2403750
- Website: greenvillesc.gov

Greenville (/ˈɡriːnvɪl/ GREEN-vil, locally /ˈɡriːnvəl/ GREEN-vəl) is a city in Greenville County, South Carolina, United States, and its county seat. It is the sixth-most populous city in South Carolina, with a population of 70,720 at the 2020 census, while the Greenville metropolitan area has an estimated 1 million residents and is the largest metropolitan area in the state.

Greenville is located approximately halfway between Atlanta and Charlotte along I-85; its metro area also includes I-185 and I-385. It is the anchor city of Upstate South Carolina, an economic and cultural region in the foothills of the Blue Ridge Mountains with an estimated population of 1.63 million.

Greenville was established in 1797 and incorporated in 1831. The city experienced early growth through the development of cotton mills and rail infrastructure, which positioned it as a key industrial hub in the Southeast. In recent decades, Greenville has shifted toward advanced manufacturing and automotive production. Numerous companies have offices within the city, such as Michelin, Prisma Health, Bon Secours, and Duke Energy. Its cultural institutions include the Peace Center and Greenville County Museum of Art, as well as the Falls Park on the Reedy next to Downtown Greenville.

== History ==
=== From Cherokee land to Greenville County ===
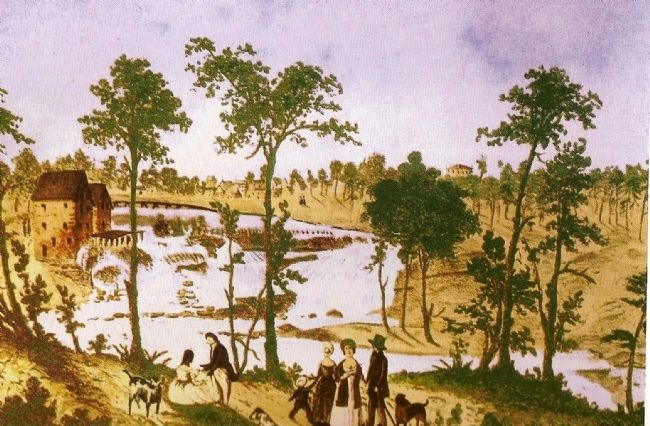
Falls Park and McBee's Mill in 1844

The land of present-day Greenville was once the hunting ground of the Cherokee, which was forbidden to colonists. A wealthy settler from Virginia named Richard Pearis arrived in South Carolina around 1754 and established relations with the Cherokee. Pearis had a child with a Cherokee woman and received about 100,000 acres (40,000 ha) from the Cherokee around 1770. Pearis established a plantation on the Reedy River called the Great Plains in present-day Downtown Greenville. The American Revolution divided the South Carolina country between the Loyalists and Patriots. Pearis supported the Loyalists and together with their allies, the Cherokee, attacked the Patriots. The Patriots retaliated by burning down Pearis' plantation and jailing him in Charleston. Pearis never returned to his plantation but Paris Mountain is named after him. The Treaty of Dewitt's Corner in 1777 ceded almost all Cherokee land, including present-day Greenville, to South Carolina.

Greenville County was created in 1786. Some sources state it was named for its physical appearance, while others say the county is named after General Nathanael Greene in honor of his service in the American Revolutionary War, or after early settler Isaac Green. Lemuel J. Alston came to Greenville County in 1788 and bought 400 acres (160 ha) and a portion of Pearis' former plantation. In 1797, Alston used his land holdings to establish a village called Pleasantburg, where he also built a stately mansion. In 1816, Alston's land was purchased by Vardry McBee, who then leased the Alston mansion for a summer resort before making the mansion his home from 1835 until his death in 1864. Pleasantburg was renamed as Greenville in 1821 and became a village in 1831. Considered to be the father of Greenville, McBee donated land for many structures, such as churches, academies, and a cotton mill. Furman University was funded by McBee who helped bring the university to Greenville from Winnsboro, South Carolina, in 1851. In 1853 McBee and other Greenville County leaders funded a new railroad called the Greenville & Columbia Railroad. Greenville boomed to around 1,000 in the 1850s due to the growth of McBee's donations and the attraction of the town as a summer resort for visitors.

=== Latter 19th century ===
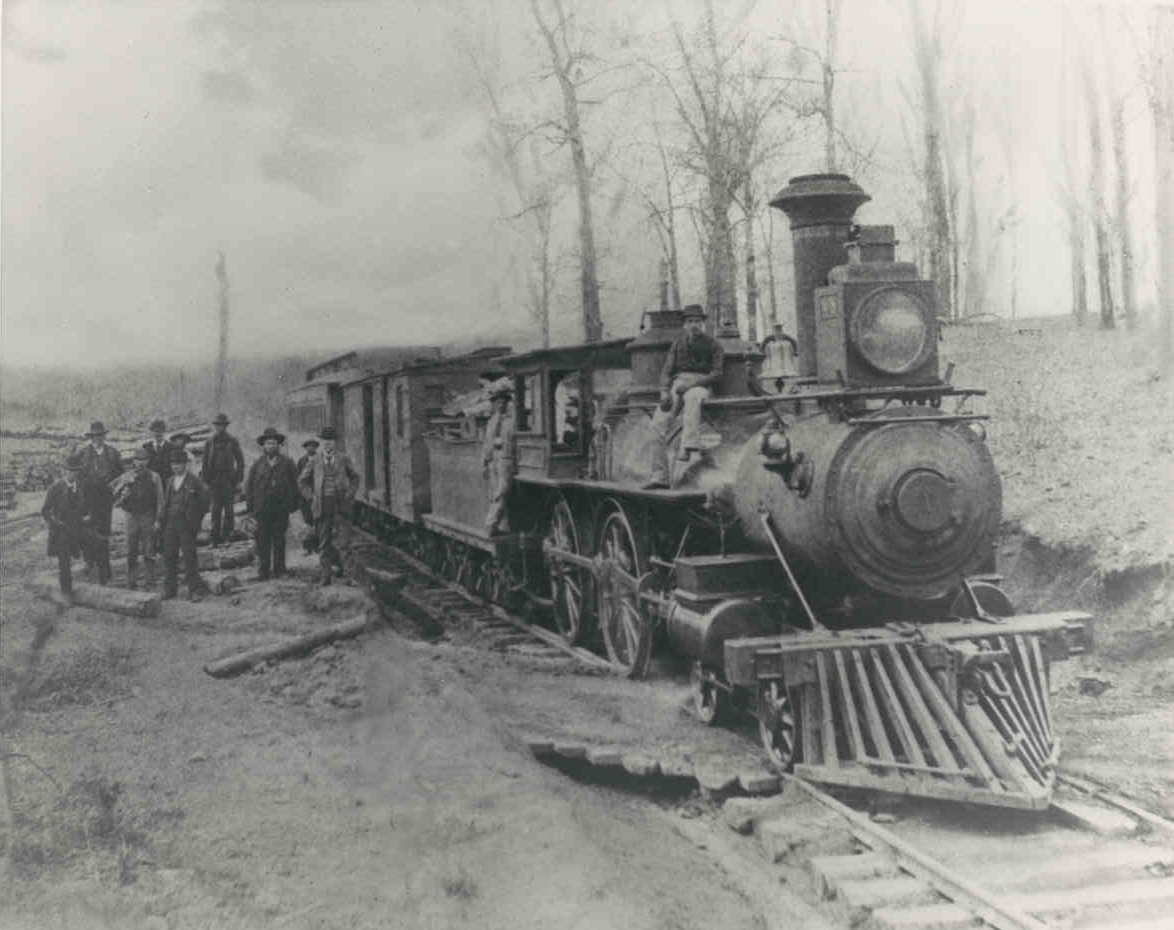
The Greenville and Northern Railway in the 1890s which was converted into the Swamp Rabbit Trail in 2010

In December 1860 Greenville supported a convention to debate the issue of secession for South Carolina. The Greenville District sent James Furman, William K. Easley, Perry E. Duncan, William H. Campbell, and James P. Harrison as delegates for the convention. On December 20, 1860, the South Carolina state convention, along with the Greenville delegation, voted to secede from the Union. Greenville County provided over 2,000 soldiers to the Confederate States Army. The town supplied food, clothing, and firearms to the Confederacy. Greenville saw no action from the war until 1865 when Union troops came through the town looking for President Jefferson Davis of the Confederacy who had fled south from Richmond, Virginia. In June 1865, President Andrew Johnson appointed Greenville County native Benjamin Franklin Perry as Governor of South Carolina.

In February 1869, Greenville's town charter was amended by the South Carolina General Assembly establishing Greenville, the town, as a city. Construction boomed in the 1870s which saw the establishment of a bridge over the Reedy River, new mills on the river, and new railroads. The Greenville News was established in 1874 as Greenville's first daily newspaper. Southern Bell installed the first telephone lines in the city. The most important infrastructure that came to the city were cotton mills. Prominent cotton mill businesses operated near Greenville making it a cotton mill town. By 1915 Greenville became known as the "Textile Center of the South." From 1915 to 2004, the city hosted an important textile manufacturing trade fair, the Southern Textile Exposition.

=== 20th century ===
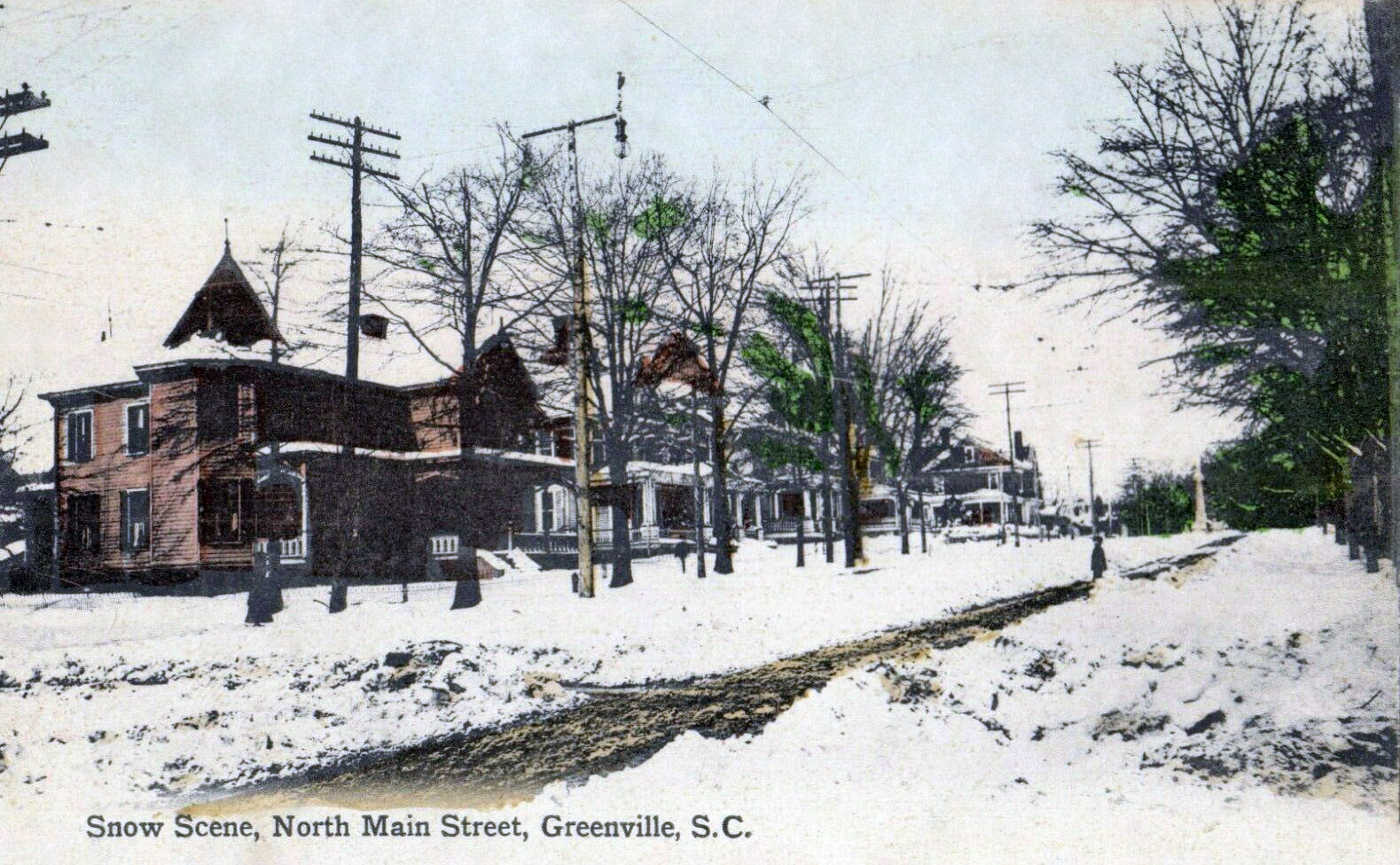
North Main Street Postcard, c. 1903

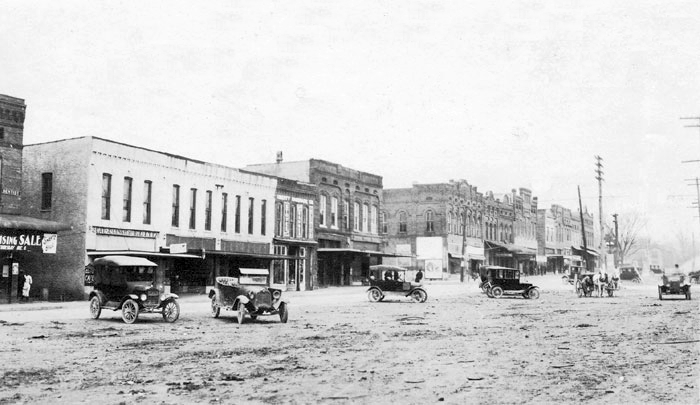
Main Street around 1910

During World War I, Greenville served as a training camp center for US Army recruits. After World War I commercial activity expanded with new movie theaters and department stores. The Mansion House was demolished and replaced with the Poinsett Hotel in 1925. The Great Depression hurt the economy of Greenville forcing mills to lay off workers. Furman University and the Greenville Women's College also struggled in the crippling economy forcing them to merge in 1933. The Textile Workers Strike of 1934 had a major impact in the city and surrounding mill towns, and the National Guard subdued the strike. The New Deal established Sirrine Stadium and a new Greenville High School. The Greenville Army Air Base was established in 1942 during World War II contributing to the further growth of Greenville.

After the war, a November 19, 1946, propane explosion left 6 dead and over 150 injured. The explosion involved a tank containing about 3,500 US gallons (13 m^{3}) of propane and could be heard from Gaffney, 50 miles (80 km) away.

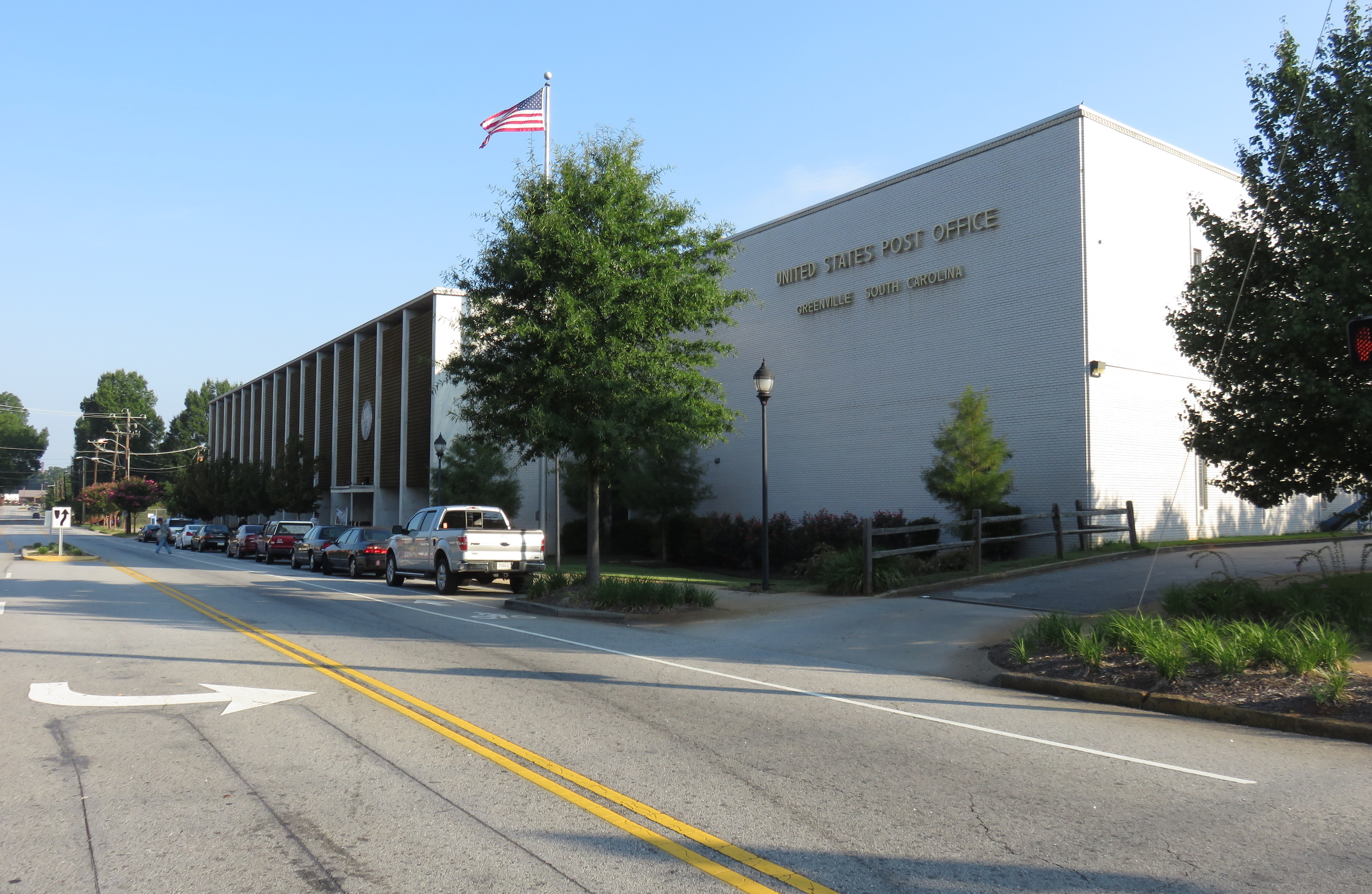
Greenville Main US Post Office

On February 16, 1947, Willie Earle, a black man accused of stabbing a cab driver, was taken from his jail cell by a mob of mostly taxi drivers and murdered. Thirty-one white men were jointly tried for the crime; most of the accused signed confessions, many of them naming Roosevelt Carlos Hurd as the lynch mob leader and the person who ultimately killed Earle with the shotgun. On May 21, 1947, a jury of 12 white men returned verdicts of not guilty for every defendant.

After World War II, Greenville's economy surged with the establishment of new stores and the expansion of the city limits. Furman University doubled its student population and moved to a new location. Higher education facilities such as Bob Jones University in 1947 and Greenville Technical College in 1962 were established in Greenville. The Greenville–Spartanburg International Airport was established in nearby Greer in 1962. The 1966 construction of the Landmark Building added what remains the city's tallest building. Greenville's economy waned in the 1970s, leaving a void due to the flight of many retailers. Mayor Max Heller then began a revitalization with the Greenville County Museum of Art and the Hughes Main Library. Main Street was then converted into a two-lane road lined with trees and sidewalks. With a 1978 federal grant, a convention center and hotel were built, bringing business back to the area.

After a succession of several mayors in the early 1980s, Bill Workman was elected in 1983 and made economic development a priority. He and the chamber of commerce convinced Michelin to move its North America headquarters to Greenville in 1984. Tens of other companies also moved to Greenville in following years, including pulp and paper business Bowater in 1992. The Greenville Municipal Stadium was constructed in 1984. The city acted as developer for the West End Market project, which later brought an arts and entertainment district.

In 1990, the Peace Center arts venue opened in downtown Greenville. In 1994, BMW opened its first manufacturing plant outside Germany between Greenville and Spartanburg. Knox White became mayor in 1995. In 1998, Bon Secours Wellness Arena replaced Greenville Memorial Auditorium as an entertainment arena. The Poinsett Hotel was renovated in the late 1990s with Poinsett Plaza at its entryway, and the Camperdown Bridge that had crossed Reedy Falls for four decades was removed and replaced with a renovated Falls Park.

=== 21st century ===
During the 2000s, thousands of people started moving to Greenville. Liberty Bridge at Falls Park was completed in 2004 and became a major landmark. Greenville has continued to evolve and grow with over 70,000 residents in its city limits as of 2020. Its growth has also improved the popularity of close cities such as Simpsonville, Mauldin, and Fountain Inn. Under the leadership of Knox White, the Swamp Rabbit Trail was opened in 2010. It is an old railroad converted into a path that attracts hundreds of thousands of tourists every year. In 2025, Greenville ranked 8th among U.S. cities in Travel + Leisure's World's Best Awards; in 2026, the city ranked 10th.

== Geography ==
Greenville is roughly equidistant between Atlanta (145 miles [233 km] southwest), and Charlotte, North Carolina (100 miles [160 km] northeast). Columbia, the state capital, is 100 miles (160 km) to the southeast.

Greenville is in the foothills of the Blue Ridge Mountains, a physiographic province of the larger Appalachian Mountains range, and includes many small hills. Sassafras Mountain, the highest point in South Carolina, is in northern Pickens County, less than 40 miles (64 km) northwest of Greenville. Many area television and radio station towers are on Paris Mountain, the second most prominent peak in the area, 8 miles (13 km) north of downtown Greenville. According to the United States Census Bureau, the city has a total area of 30.02 square miles (77.8 km^{2}), of which 29.80 square miles (77.2 km^{2}) is land and 0.23 square miles (0.60 km^{2}) (0.77%) is water. The Reedy River, a tributary of the Saluda River, runs through the center of the city.

Greenville is located in the Brevard Fault Zone and has occasional minor earthquakes.

=== Climate ===
Greenville, like much of the Piedmont region of the southeastern United States, has a mild version of a humid subtropical climate (Köppen Cfa), with four distinct seasons; the city is part of USDA Hardiness zone 8a/8b. Winters are short and generally cool, with a January daily average of 42.2 °F (5.7 °C). On average, there are 59 nights per year that drop to or below freezing, and only 1.3 days that fail to rise above freezing. April is the driest month, with an average of 3.36 inches (85 mm) of precipitation.

Summers are hot and humid, with a daily temperature average in July of 79.9 °F (26.6 °C). There are an average 43 days per year with highs at or above 90 °F (32 °C). Official record temperatures range from 107 °F (42 °C) on July 1, 2012, down to −6 °F (−21 °C) on January 30, 1966; the record cold daily maximum is 19 °F (−7 °C) on December 31, 1917, while, conversely, the record warm daily minimum is 80 °F (27 °C) on July 12, 1937, the last of three occasions. The average window for freezing temperatures is November 4 through April 1, allowing a growing season of 217 days.

Precipitation is generally less frequent in autumn than spring and, on average, Greenville receives 47.2 inches (1,200 mm) of precipitation annually, which is somewhat evenly distributed throughout the year, although summer is slightly wetter; annual precipitation has historically ranged from 31.08 in (789 mm) in 2007 to 72.53 in (1,842 mm) in 1908. In addition, there is an average of 4.7 inches (11.9 cm) of snow, occurring mainly from January thru March, with rare snow occurring in November or April. More frequent ice storms and sleet mixed in with rain occur in the Greenville area; seasonal snowfall has historically ranged from trace amounts as recently as 2011–12 to 21.4 in (54 cm) in 1935–36. These storms can have a major impact on the area, as they often pull tree limbs down on power lines and make driving hazardous.

Climate data for Greenville, South Carolina (Greenville–Spartanburg Int'l), 1991–2020 normals, (Note: Mean monthly maxima and minima (i.e. the expected highest and lowest temperature readings at any point during the year or given month) calculated based on data at said location from 1991 to 2020.) extremes 1884–present (Note: Official records for Greenville kept April 1884 to 10 December 1941 at downtown, 11 December 1941 to 14 October 1962 at Greenville Downtown Airport, and at Greenville–Spartanburg Int'l near Greer since 15 October 1962. For more information, see ThreadEx.)
Month	Jan	Feb	Mar	Apr	May	Jun	Jul	Aug	Sep	Oct	Nov	Dec	Year
Record high °F (°C)	82 (28)	81 (27)	91 (33)	94 (34)	100 (38)	105 (41)	107 (42)	105 (41)	101 (38)	98 (37)	86 (30)	79 (26)	107 (42)
Mean maximum °F (°C)	70.3 (21.3)	73.2 (22.9)	81.2 (27.3)	85.8 (29.9)	90.6 (32.6)	95.1 (35.1)	97.3 (36.3)	95.9 (35.5)	92.1 (33.4)	85.1 (29.5)	77.0 (25.0)	70.6 (21.4)	98.3 (36.8)
Mean daily maximum °F (°C)	52.8 (11.6)	57.0 (13.9)	64.4 (18.0)	73.2 (22.9)	80.3 (26.8)	87.2 (30.7)	90.3 (32.4)	88.5 (31.4)	82.7 (28.2)	73.1 (22.8)	62.9 (17.2)	54.9 (12.7)	72.3 (22.4)
Daily mean °F (°C)	42.5 (5.8)	45.9 (7.7)	52.8 (11.6)	61.0 (16.1)	68.9 (20.5)	76.3 (24.6)	79.7 (26.5)	78.4 (25.8)	72.5 (22.5)	61.7 (16.5)	51.6 (10.9)	44.8 (7.1)	61.3 (16.3)
Mean daily minimum °F (°C)	32.1 (0.1)	34.8 (1.6)	41.2 (5.1)	48.7 (9.3)	57.5 (14.2)	65.5 (18.6)	69.2 (20.7)	68.3 (20.2)	62.4 (16.9)	50.4 (10.2)	40.4 (4.7)	34.8 (1.6)	50.4 (10.2)
Mean minimum °F (°C)	15.7 (−9.1)	20.3 (−6.5)	24.8 (−4.0)	33.5 (0.8)	43.7 (6.5)	56.3 (13.5)	63.0 (17.2)	61.6 (16.4)	50.6 (10.3)	35.1 (1.7)	26.1 (−3.3)	21.1 (−6.1)	13.7 (−10.2)
Record low °F (°C)	−6 (−21)	−5 (−21)	11 (−12)	22 (−6)	27 (−3)	40 (4)	53 (12)	50 (10)	32 (0)	25 (−4)	11 (−12)	3 (−16)	−6 (−21)
Average precipitation inches (mm)	4.12 (105)	3.84 (98)	4.48 (114)	4.04 (103)	4.07 (103)	3.90 (99)	4.82 (122)	4.66 (118)	3.73 (95)	3.59 (91)	3.84 (98)	4.58 (116)	49.67 (1,262)
Average snowfall inches (cm)	1.6 (4.1)	1.0 (2.5)	0.6 (1.5)	0.0 (0.0)	0.0 (0.0)	0.0 (0.0)	0.0 (0.0)	0.0 (0.0)	0.0 (0.0)	0.0 (0.0)	0.1 (0.25)	0.6 (1.5)	3.9 (9.9)
Average precipitation days (≥ 0.01 in)	10.4	9.4	10.2	9.7	9.7	10.8	12.0	11.1	8.0	7.1	8.5	10.0	116.9
Average snowy days (≥ 0.1 in)	1.1	0.7	0.3	0.0	0.0	0.0	0.0	0.0	0.0	0.0	0.1	0.4	2.6
Average relative humidity (%)	65.8	62.6	62.1	60.7	68.5	70.5	74.0	75.6	75.8	70.9	68.2	67.7	68.5
Mean monthly sunshine hours	176.6	182.7	236.2	264.7	269.2	270.8	267.8	253.9	229.2	235.2	184.3	169.4	2,740
Percentage possible sunshine	56	60	64	68	62	62	61	61	62	67	59	55	62
Source: NOAA (relative humidity 1962–1990, sun 1961–1990)

== Demographics ==
Historical population
Census	Pop.	Note	%±
1850	1,305		—
1860	1,518		16.3%
1870	2,757		81.6%
1880	6,160		123.4%
1890	8,607		39.7%
1900	11,860		37.8%
1910	15,741		32.7%
1920	23,127		46.9%
1930	29,154		26.1%
1940	34,734		19.1%
1950	58,161		67.4%
1960	66,188		13.8%
1970	61,208		−7.5%
1980	58,242		−4.8%
1990	58,282		0.1%
2000	56,002		−3.9%
2010	58,409		4.3%
2020	70,720		21.1%
2025 (est.)	75,310		6.5%
U.S. Decennial Census; 2020

Greenville is the largest principal city of the Greenville-Anderson-Greer, SC Metropolitan Statistical Area, a metropolitan statistical area that covers Greenville, Laurens, Anderson and Pickens counties and had an estimated population of 975,480 in 2023.

The U.S. Census Bureau's Vintage 2024 estimates report that the Greenville–Anderson–Greer Metropolitan Statistical Area grew from 979,608 residents on July 1, 2023, to 996,680 on July 1, 2024—an annual increase of 17,072 (+1.7%) and +7.4% since 2020.

Since South Carolina law makes annexing the suburban areas illegal, Greenville's city proper population is small as a proportion of the total population of the urbanized area.

=== Racial and ethnic composition ===
Greenville city, South Carolina – Racial and ethnic composition Note: the US Census treats Hispanic/Latino as an ethnic category. This table excludes Latinos from the racial categories and assigns them to a separate category. Hispanics/Latinos may be of any race.
Race / Ethnicity (NH = Non-Hispanic)	Pop 2000	Pop 2010	Pop 2020	% 2000	% 2010	% 2020
White alone (NH)	33,917	35,776	45,504	60.56%	61.25%	64.34%
Black or African American alone (NH)	18,866	17,377	16,017	33.69%	29.75%	22.65%
Native American or Alaska Native alone (NH)	68	91	91	0.12%	0.16%	0.13%
Asian alone (NH)	697	782	1,528	1.24%	1.34%	2.16%
Native Hawaiian or Pacific Islander alone (NH)	30	46	89	0.05%	0.08%	0.13%
Other race alone (NH)	51	87	294	0.09%	0.15%	0.42%
Mixed race or Multiracial (NH)	446	807	2,269	0.80%	1.38%	3.21%
Hispanic or Latino (any race)	1,927	3,443	4,928	3.44%	5.89%	6.97%
Total	56,002	58,409	70,720	100.00%	100.00%	100.00%

=== 2020 census ===
As of the 2020 census, there were 70,720 people, 32,842 households, and 15,431 families residing in the city.

The median age was 34.3 years; 18.8% of residents were under the age of 18 and 14.7% were 65 years of age or older. For every 100 females there were 92.2 males, and for every 100 females age 18 and over there were 89.7 males age 18 and over.

Of the 32,842 households, 22.1% had children under the age of 18 living in them, 32.9% were married-couple households, 24.2% were households with a male householder and no spouse or partner present, and 36.2% were households with a female householder and no spouse or partner present. About 42.0% of all households were made up of individuals and 12.0% had someone living alone who was 65 years of age or older.

There were 37,323 housing units, of which 12.0% were vacant. The homeowner vacancy rate was 2.5% and the rental vacancy rate was 11.7%.

Of residents, 100.0% lived in urban areas, while 0.0% lived in rural areas.

Racial composition as of the 2020 census
Race	Number	Percent
White	46,520	65.8%
Black or African American	16,164	22.9%
American Indian and Alaska Native	169	0.2%
Asian	1,544	2.2%
Native Hawaiian and Other Pacific Islander	89	0.1%
Some other race	2,306	3.3%
Two or more races	3,928	5.6%

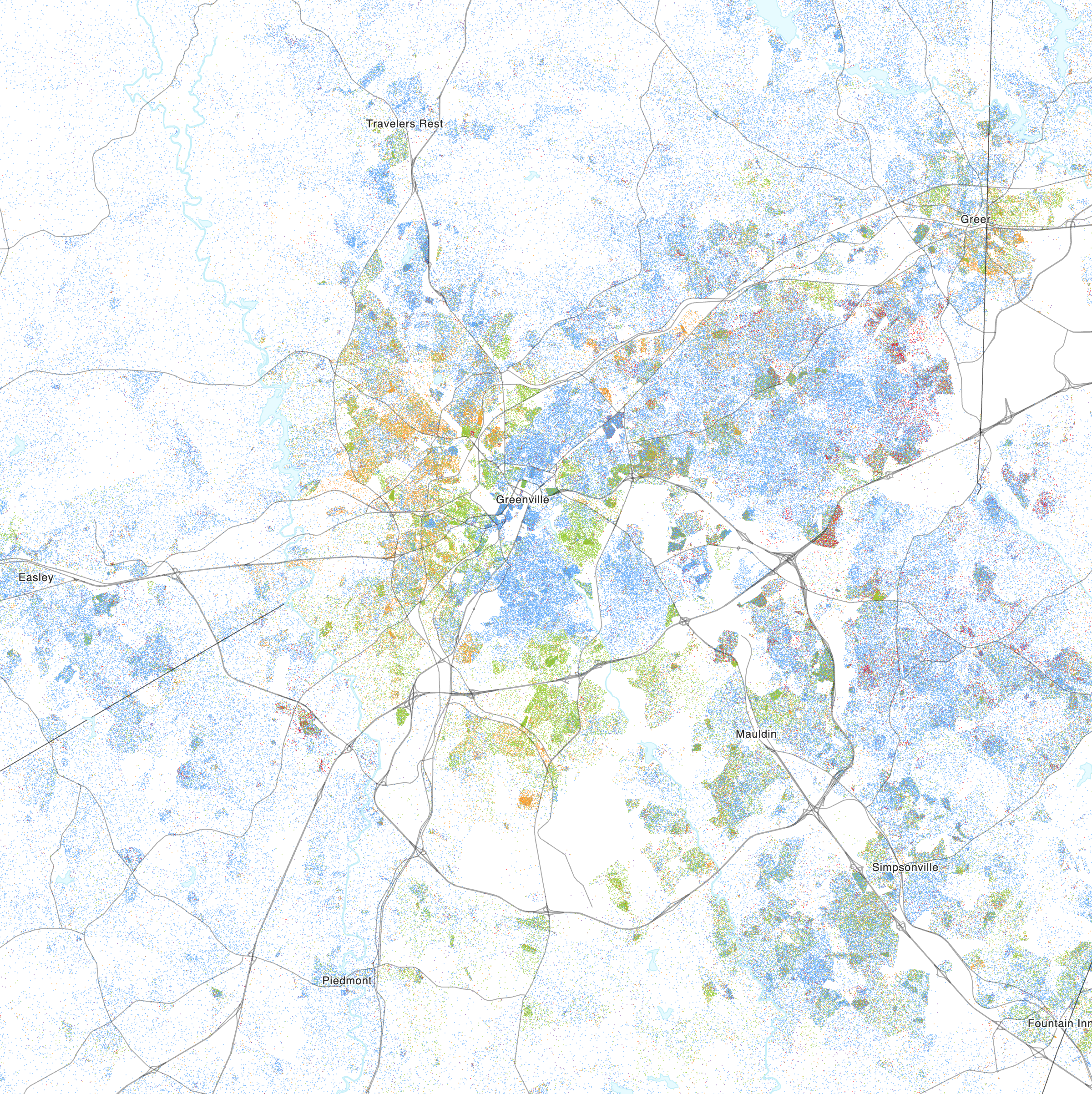
Map of racial distribution in Greenville, 2020 U.S. census. Each dot is one person: ⬤ White ⬤ Black ⬤ Asian ⬤ Hispanic ⬤ Multiracial ⬤ Native American/Other

=== 2010 census ===
At the 2010 census, there were 58,409 people, 24,382 households, and 12,581 families residing in the city. The population density was 2,148.0 inhabitants per square mile (829.3/km^{2}). There were 27,295 housing units at an average density of 1,046.9 per square mile (404.2/km^{2}). The racial composition of the city was 62.12% White, 31.54% Black or African American, 3.44% Hispanic or Latino (of any race), 1.27% Asian, 0.14% Native American, 0.06% Pacific Islander, 1.37% of other races, and 1.11% of Two or more races.

There were 29,418 households, out of which 22.3% had children under the age of 18 living with them, 32.7% were married couples living together, 15.5% had a female householder with no husband present, and 48.4% were non-families. Of all households, 40.8% were made up of individuals, and 12.8% had someone living alone who was 65 years of age or older. The average household size was 2.11 and the average family size was 2.90.

In the city, the age distribution of the population shows 20.0% under the age of 18, 13.8% from 18 to 24, 31.3% from 25 to 44, 20.5% from 45 to 64, and 14.4% who were 65 years of age or older. The median age was 35 years. For every 100 females, there were 89.9 males. For every 100 females age 18 and over, there were 86.8 males.

The median income for a household in the city was $33,144, and the median income for a family was $44,125. Males had a median income of $35,111 versus $25,339 for females. The per capita income for the city was $23,242. About 12.2% of families and 16.1% of the population were below the poverty line, including 22.7% of those under age 18 and 17.5% of those age 65 or over.

== Economy ==
Greenville's economy through the late 1800s to the late 1900s was based largely on its textile manufacturing, with up to 19 mills (Note: Those 19 mills being American Spinning Company Mill No. 2, Poe Textile Mill, Union Bleachery Mill, Riverdale Mill, Monaghan Mill, Southern Weaving Mill, Woodside Mill, Carolina/Poinsett Mill, Piedmont Plush Mill, Brandon Mill, KM Fabrics Mill, Westervelt/Judson Mill, Dunean Mill, Franklin Mill, Mills Mill, McGee/Beaver Duck Mill, Camperdown Mill, Vardry Mill, and Huguenot Mill.) at one point, and because of that, the city was known as "The Textile Capital of the World" for that period. In the last few decades, favorable wages and tax benefits have lured foreign companies to invest heavily in the area. The city is the North American headquarters for Michelin, Synnex, United Community Bank, AVX Corporation, Sage Automotive Interiors, NCEES, Ameco, Southern Tide, Confluence Outdoor, JTEKT, Cleva North America, Spinx, Current Lighting Solutions, Prisma Health, and Scansource. In 2003, the International Center for Automotive Research was created, establishing CUICAR as the new model for automotive research. The Center for Emerging Technologies in mobility and energy was opened in 2011, hosting a number of companies in leading edge R&D and the headquarters for Sage Automotive.

When the former Donaldson Air Force Base closed in 1963, the land became the South Carolina Technology and Aviation Center (SCTAC). SCTAC is the home of the F-16 Fighting Falcon production line of Lockheed Martin. Michelin, 3M, PhoenixEV and Stevens Aerospace have major operations at the park as well. In addition, SCTAC is the home of South Carolina's world-class EV test track, the International Transportation and Innovation Center (ITIC), as well as the South Carolina Army National Guard Aviation Support Facility.

== Arts and culture ==
As the largest city in the Upstate, Greenville offers many activities and attractions. Greenville's theaters and event venues regularly host major concerts and touring theater companies. Four independent theaters present several plays a year. The New York Times included Greenville among 52 places in the world to visit in 2023, highlighting the city's wide variety of restaurants.

The Bon Secours Wellness Arena brings national tours of many popular bands to downtown, and the Peace Center for the Performing Arts provides a venue for orchestras and Broadway shows. A planned multimillion-dollar renovation to the center's main concert hall lobby and riverside amphitheatre began in the spring of 2011.

=== Event venues ===
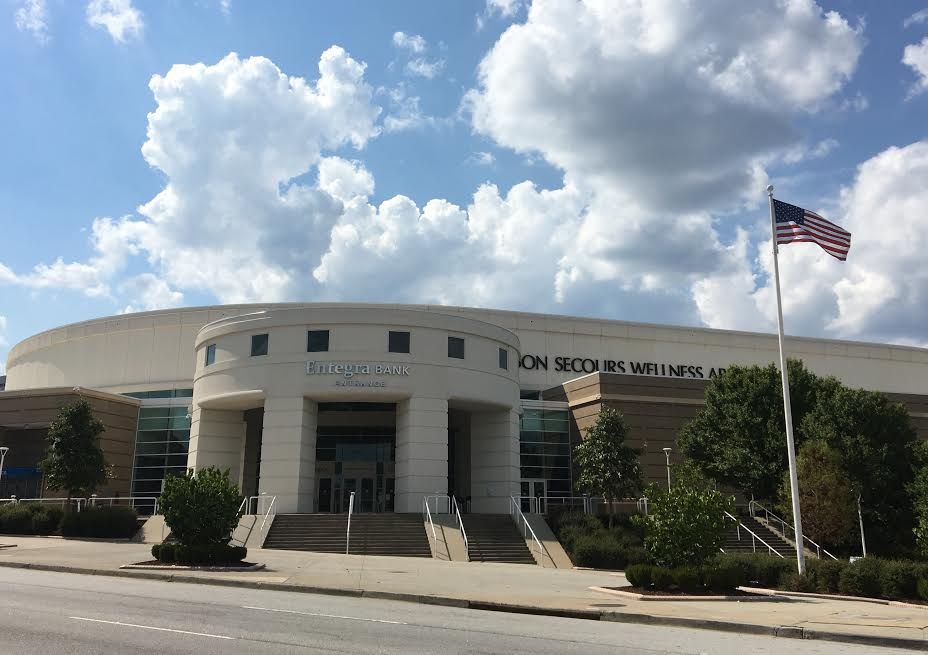
Bon Secours Wellness Arena

- Bon Secours Wellness Arena, the home of the Greenville Swamp Rabbits of the ECHL, is a 16,000-seat arena in downtown Greenville that opened in 1998 as the Bi-Lo Center.
- Fluor Field at the West End, home of the Greenville Drive baseball team, the Class-A affiliate of the Boston Red Sox. The stadium was designed to echo many of the features of Fenway Park, home of the parent club, including a representation of Fenway's Green Monster standing 30 feet (9.1 m) high in left field.
- Greenville Convention Center, a 280,000-square-foot (26,000 m^{2}) convention and meeting facility that was established in 1964 as the newest of a series of Textile Halls, the original dating back to 1915 as the Southern Textile Exposition.
- Peace Center, performing arts center that includes a concert hall with 2,100 seats and a theater seating 400, and a 1,200-seat amphitheater. In late 2024, the Peace Center will debut A Music Project (AMP), a $36 million project to renovate three existing buildings on its campus into live music venues. This will include the Coach Music Factory, a new 1300-person capacity music club.

=== Landmarks ===
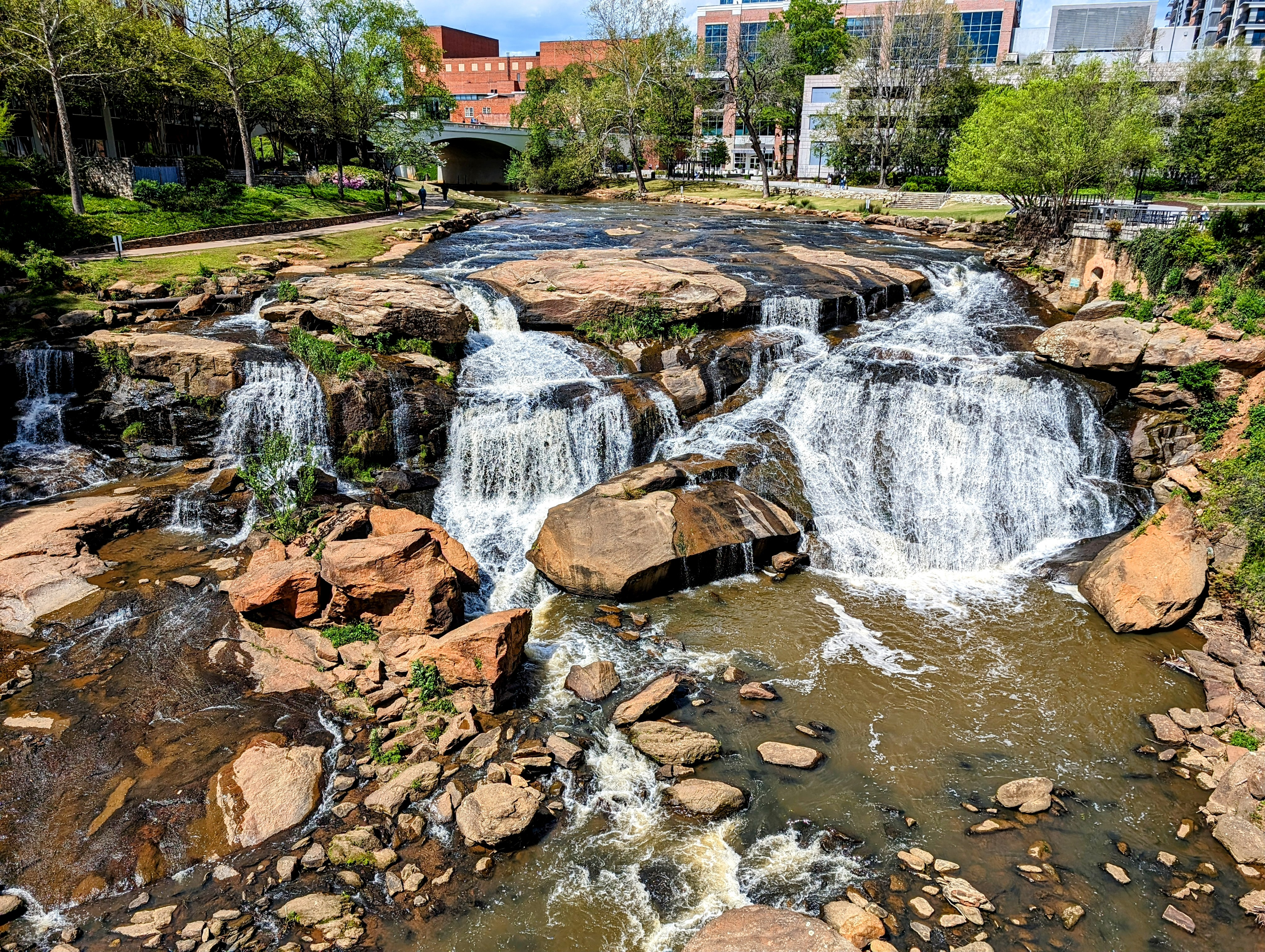
Falls Park On The Reedy River

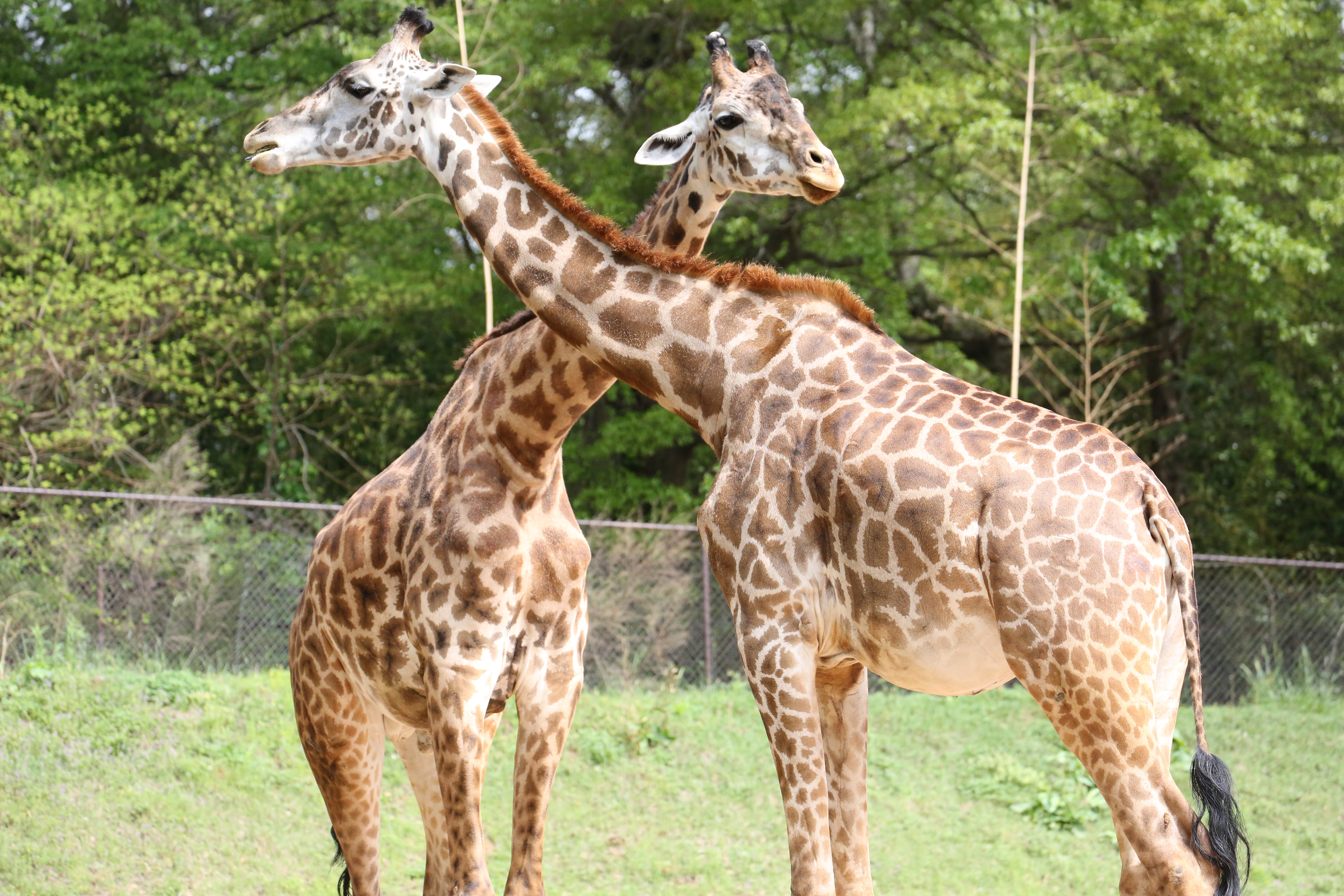
Greenville Zoo

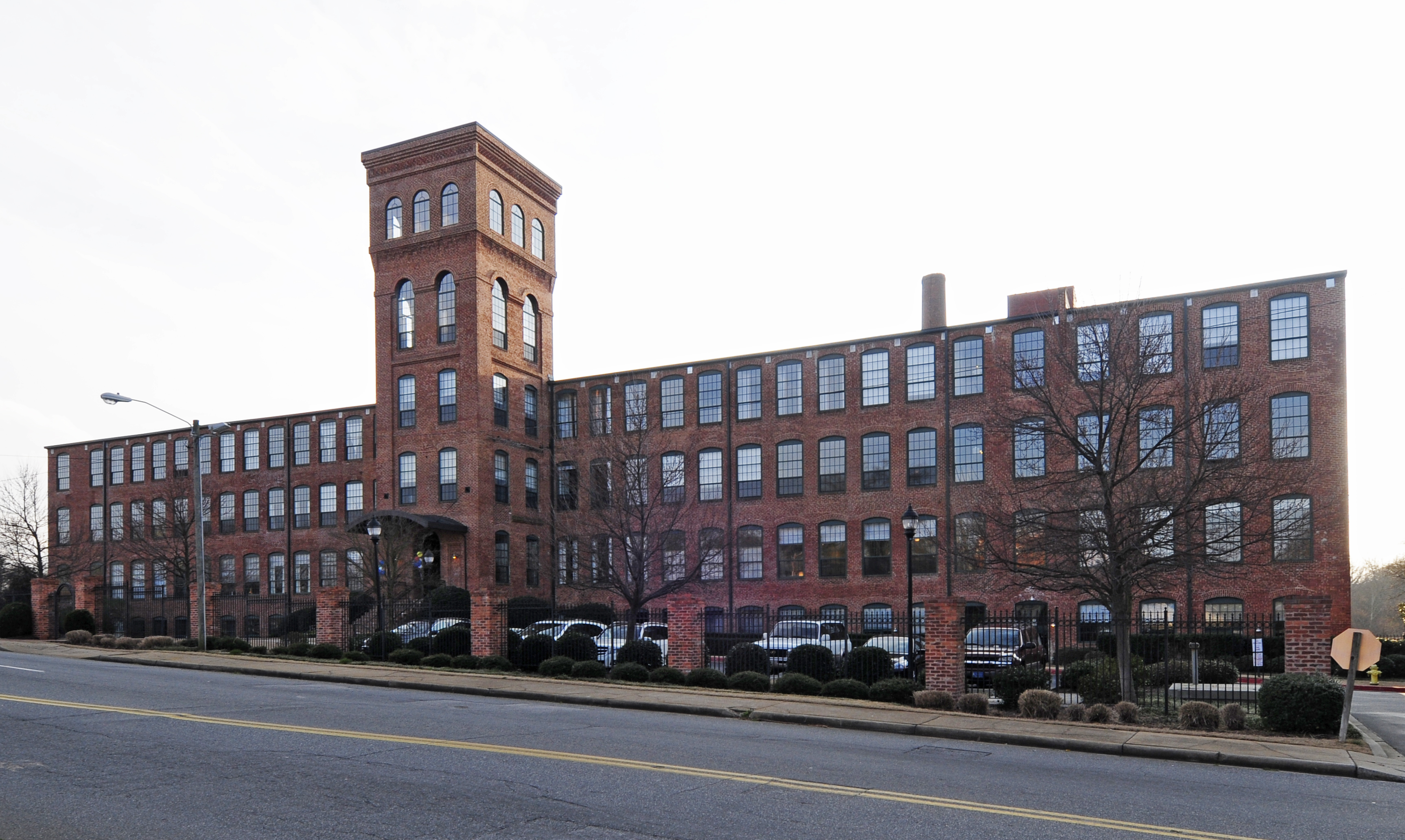
Mills Mill, converted into loft condominiums

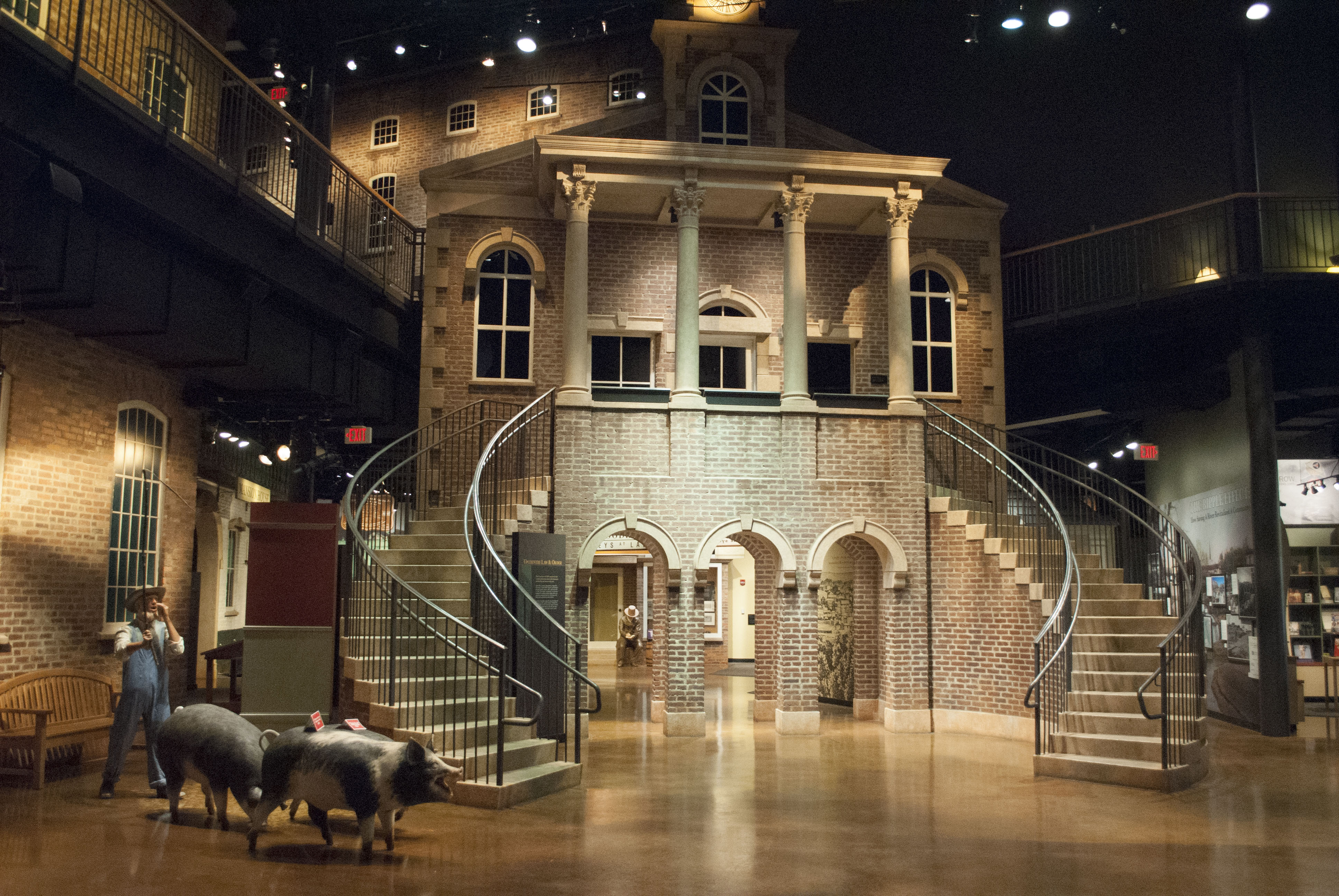
Upcountry History Museum

- Cancer Survivors Park, opened in 2018
- The Children's Museum of the Upstate, one of the first children's museums to become Smithsonian affiliated.
- Falls Park on the Reedy, a large regional park in the West End with gardens and several waterfalls, with access to the Swamp Rabbit Trail. Dedicated in 2004, the $15.0 million park is home to the Liberty Bridge, a pedestrian suspension bridge overlooking the Reedy River. The park's development sparked a $75 million public-private development, Riverplace, directly across Main Street. Falls Park has been called the birthplace of Greenville, but in the mid-20th century the area was in severe decline, and the Camperdown Bridge was built, obstructing the view of the falls. In the mid-1980s, the City adopted a master plan for the park. However, renovation accelerated under Mayor Knox White in the late 1990s, leading to the removal of the Camperdown Bridge in 2002 and the construction of the Miguel Rosales-designed Liberty Bridge in 2004. While bridges with similar structural concepts have been built in Europe, the Liberty Bridge is unique in its geometry.
- Greenville County Museum of Art, specializing in American art, frequently with a Southern perspective that dates back to the 18th century. It is noted for its collections of work by Andrew Wyeth and Jasper Johns, as well as a contemporary collection that features such notables as Andy Warhol, Georgia O'Keeffe, and others.
- Greenville Zoo, established in 1960 and is located in Cleveland Park.
- Linky Stone Park: The Children's Garden, a 1.7-acre (0.69 ha) horticultural attraction.
- McPherson Park, the city's oldest park and has a free public miniature golf course.
- Roper Mountain Science Center, home to a historic 23-inch (580 mm) refractor telescope, eighth largest of its kind in the United States.
- Runway Park at GMU, viewing location for aircraft taking off and landing with an educational amphitheater, exercise "Perimeter Taxiway", walking "Runways", aviation themed playground, a swing set, a Bi-plane "Climber", a picnic hangar and a Cessna 310 display. A 15-foot (4.6 m) cross section of a Boeing 737 fuselage serves as a park entrance.
- Shoeless Joe Jackson Museum & Baseball Library, located in the historic home of baseball player Shoeless Joe Jackson adjacent to Fluor Field at the West End.
- Swamp Rabbit Trail, a 22-mile (35 km) greenway connecting downtown Greenville to the City of Travelers Rest. On June 16, 2023, a 4.5-mile (7.2 km) extension of the trail was opened, connecting Cleveland Park to the Clemson University International Center for Automotive Research (CU-ICAR).
- Unity Park, located along the Reedy River just west of downtown, opened in May 2022. The 60-acre (24 ha) park features basketball courts, a baseball field, a splash pad, a 10,000-square-foot welcome center/event space and three pedestrian bridges spanning the river. Five walking trails totaling 2.5 miles (4.0 km) connect to the Swamp Rabbit Trail as it passes through the park. The park merged what was once two segregated parks, Mayberry Park for Black residents and Meadowbrook Park for white residents. Just north of the park, at the intersection of West Washington and South Hudson streets, the city dedicated the Lila Mae Brock Memorial, named after the late Southernside community leader described as "the epitome of unity."
- Upcountry History Museum, the area's largest history museum and a Smithsonian affiliate.

=== Festivals ===
- Artisphere, a three-day art festival held each spring. The 2019 festival featured musicians The New Respects and Jill Andrews and over a hundred visual artists and street performers.
- Euphoria Greenville, an annual four-day culinary mid-September event series held at various city venues; the food, wine, and music festival in 2019 included an educational component and dinners by Michelin-starred chefs.
- Fall for Greenville, a three-day music and food street festival held each fall. The 2019 festival was the 37th, with hundreds of food items and tens of musical artists across six stages.
- First Fridays Gallery Crawl, features more than 30 art galleries and venues opening to the public with free admission. Hosted by the Metropolitan Arts Council, it occurs the first Friday of every month from 6 p.m. to 9 p.m.
- The Greek Festival, a three-day festival sponsored by the Greek Orthodox Church in downtown Greenville to celebrate Greek culture. 2019's 33rd annual festival of dance, music, and food included tours of St. George Greek Orthodox Cathedral.
- Greenville Jazz Fest, celebrates jazz music and culture. Its inaugural event on June 3, 2023, included the Grammy award-winning Rebirth Brass Band.
- Greenville Open Studios, established in 2002, is an annual three-day local arts celebration in which 158 local artists open their studios to the public. The 2019 festival was the 18th, with record-setting attendance.
- iMAGINE Upstate, weekend celebration and showcase of STEM, entrepreneurial, creative, and innovative activity in the Upstate held each spring. The festival promotes learning as fun, through various hands-on activities, interactive shows, and experiences.
- Indie Craft Parade, festival of handmade art held each September. 2019 hosted the 10th annual event, which has over 100 artists, local food, and a free photo booth.
- New South Comedy Festival, a ten-day comedy festival featuring improvisational, stand-up, sketch, and musical comedy from around the country. 2018's 5th annual festival featured over 300 comedians.
- SC Comicon, a two-day comic book convention held annually. The event draws thousands of attendees, many of whom dress in cosplay.
- Upstate Shakespeare Festival, hosts performances of Shakespeare and other classic plays each summer in Falls Park. The 25th festival was held in 2019 and featured The Tempest, performed by The Warehouse Theatre.

=== Visual art ===
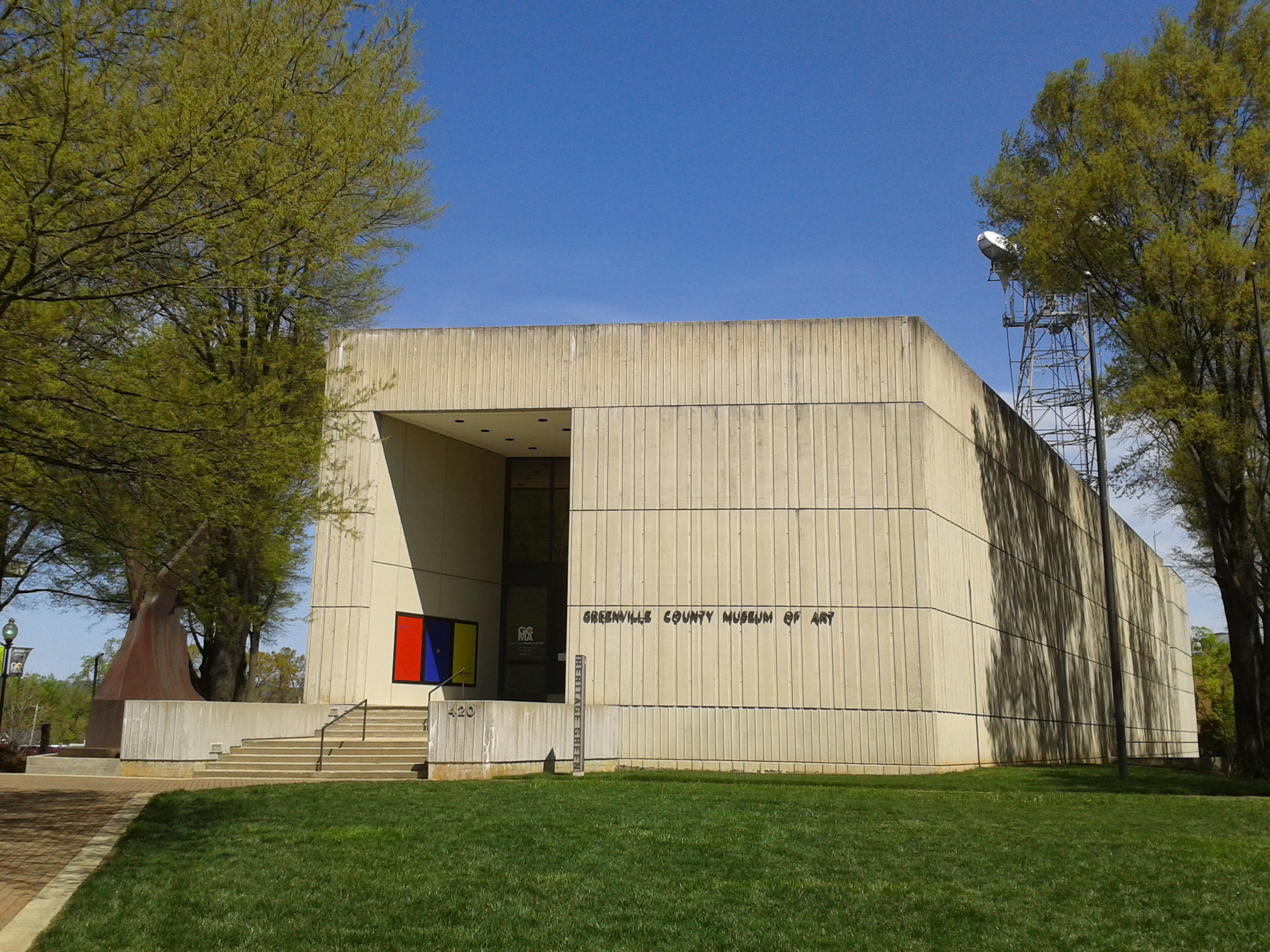
Greenville County Museum of Art

A number of local artists operate studios and galleries in the city, especially the Village of West Greenville near downtown. The Metropolitan Arts Council provides a number of public events that focus on the visual arts, including the First Fridays Gallery Crawl and Greenville Open Studios. Greenville has some notable fine arts museums:

- Bob Jones University Museum & Gallery, contains a diverse collection of European masterworks.
- Greenville County Museum of Art, home of the Andrew Wyeth Collection, was founded with a significant contribution from local industrialist, Arthur Magill. It contains pieces by Jackson Pollock, Jonathan Greene, Georgia O'Keeffe, Jasper Johns, and William H. Johnson.

=== Music ===
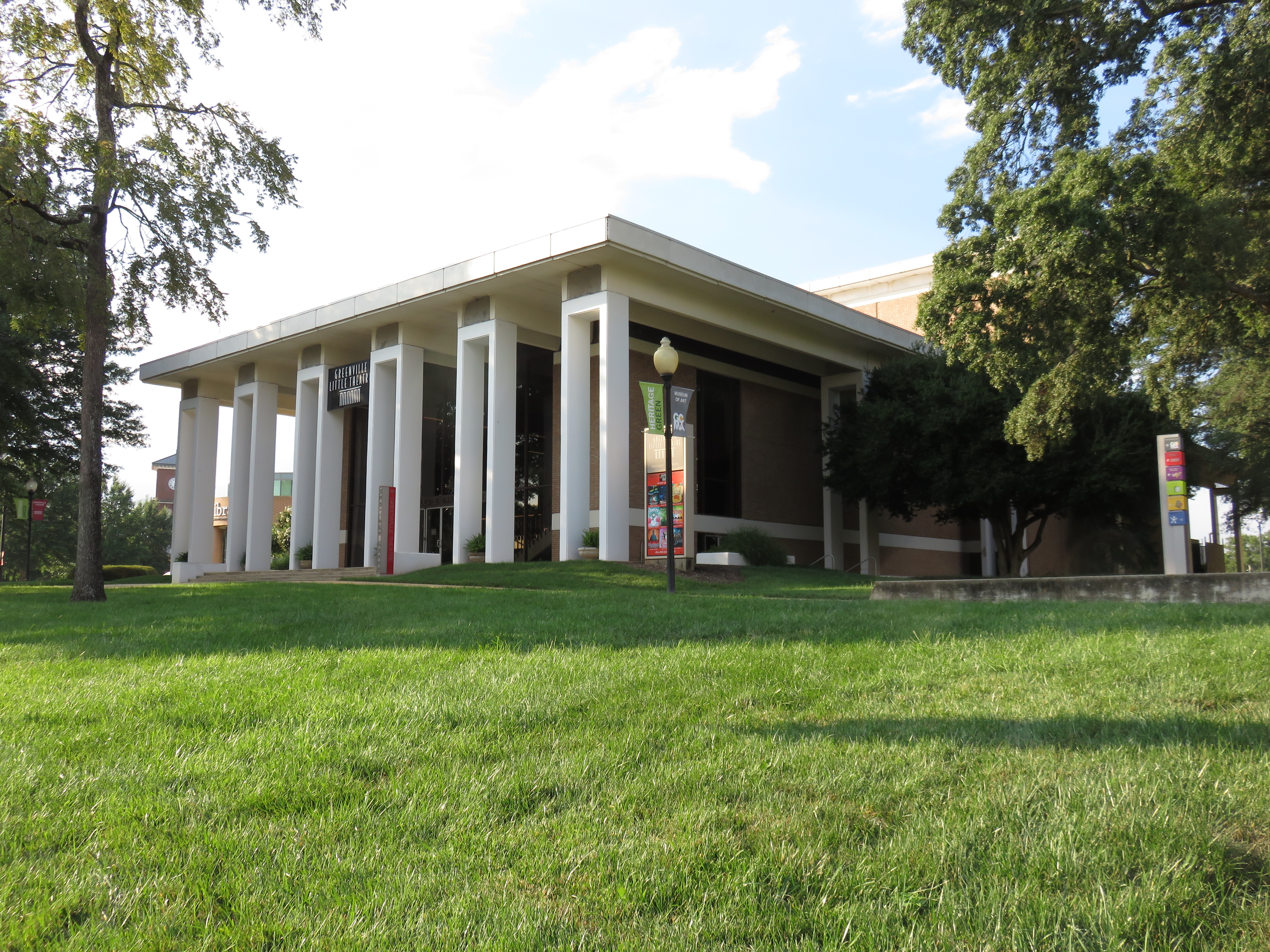
Greenville Theatre

Greenville's music scene is home to local, regional, and national bands performing music in the various genres. The city is home to the Greenville Symphony Orchestra, Greenville County Youth Orchestra, Carolina Youth Symphony, the Carolina Pops Orchestra, and the Greenville Concert Band. Greenville Light Opera Works (GLOW Lyric Theatre) is a professional lyric theatre in Greenville that produces Musical Theatre, Operetta and Opera.

Local a cappella singing groups include the women's Vocal Matrix Chorus (formerly Greenville in Harmony) and the men's Palmetto Statesmen chorus. Additional choral groups include the Greenville Chorale and the Greenville Gay Men's Chorus.

Greenville is also home to the Sigal Music Museum, formerly known as the Carolina Music Museum. In the 1930s the building was a Coca-Cola bottling company.

=== Literary arts ===
Two literary non-profit groups are located in Greenville: The Emrys Foundation, founded in 1983 and Wits End Poetry, founded in 2002.

== Sports ==
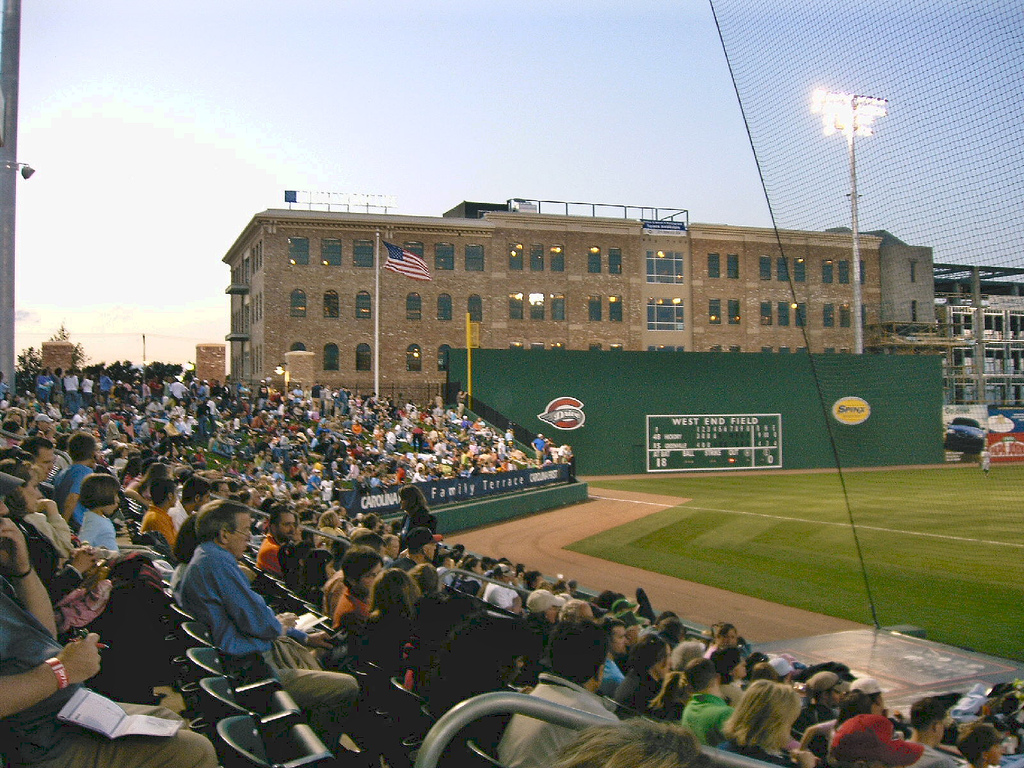
Spectators at a Greenville Drive game

The National Christian College Athletic Association (NCCAA) sports conference is headquartered in Greenville, as are various minor league and university sports teams.

Minor League sports teams:

- Greenville Drive, High-A affiliate of the Boston Red Sox in the South Atlantic League. The Drive played their first season at Greenville Municipal Stadium, former home of the Atlanta Braves AA affiliate. The Drive started their second season in their new downtown ballpark on April 6, 2006, which, prior to the start of the 2008 season, was renamed Fluor Field at the West End. For the first year after their founding, they were called the Greenville Bombers, having moved from Columbia, South Carolina. Before that, Greenville hosted various other minor league baseball teams, beginning with the Greenville Spinners in 1907.
- Greenville Liberty SC, soccer team in USL W League. In June 2021, the USL announced a women's team, associated with Greenville Triumph SC, would begin play in 2022 as part of a new W league. In their inaugural season, the Liberty were the regular season champions of the South Atlantic Division. For the 2023 season, the team plays at Paladin Stadium on the campus of Furman University.
- Greenville Swamp Rabbits, minor league hockey team in the ECHL, began play in the 2010–11 hockey season as the Greenville Road Warriors and were renamed in 2015.
- Greenville Gaels, hurling team in the Southeast Division of the US Gaelic Athletic Association.
- Greenville Triumph SC, soccer team in USL League One. In their first four seasons, the Triumph qualified for the league finals three times and won the league championship once (2020). For the 2023 season, the team plays at Paladin Stadium on the campus of Furman University.

Bob Jones University

- Bob Jones University competes at the NCCAA Division II level. The BJU Bruins began intercollegiate athletics in the 2012–2013 school year. The school began with men and women's soccer and basketball, with hopes of eventually adding other sports. In June 2020, the Bruins were accepted to the NCAA, competing at the Division III level. As of 2023, the university supports 12 varsity sports programs.

Furman University

- The Furman Paladins compete at the NCAA Division I level. (Note: Furman football is a member of the NCAA Football Championship Subdivision.) Furman athletic teams compete on-campus in various venues, including Paladin Stadium, Timmons Arena, and the Eugene Stone Soccer Stadium. Furman is a member of the Southern Conference.

North Greenville University

- North Greenville University competes at the NCAA Division II level. Their mascot is the Trailblazer.

=== Greenville-Pickens Speedway ===
Greenville‑Pickens Speedway is a historic half‑mile (0.5 mi/0.805 km) paved oval short track located in Easley, South Carolina, just off Calhoun Memorial Highway. Originally constructed in 1940 as a dirt track and briefly closed during World War II, it reopened on July 4, 1946, hosting both stock car and horse races. The venue was purchased by Tom and Pete Blackwell in 1955, who converted it to asphalt in 1970 and guided the speedway's golden era, which included NASCAR Grand National (now Cup Series) events from 1955 to 1956 and 1958–1971. It earned a place in motorsport history by hosting NASCAR's first televised flag‑to‑flag race—the 1971 Greenville 200 aired live on ABC's Wide World of Sports. Despite its heritage, racing last ran in 2022 before the property was listed for sale, with plans announced in 2024 to redevelop surrounding acreage into a 600‑acre industrial park named "Speedway Business & Technology Park".

== Government ==
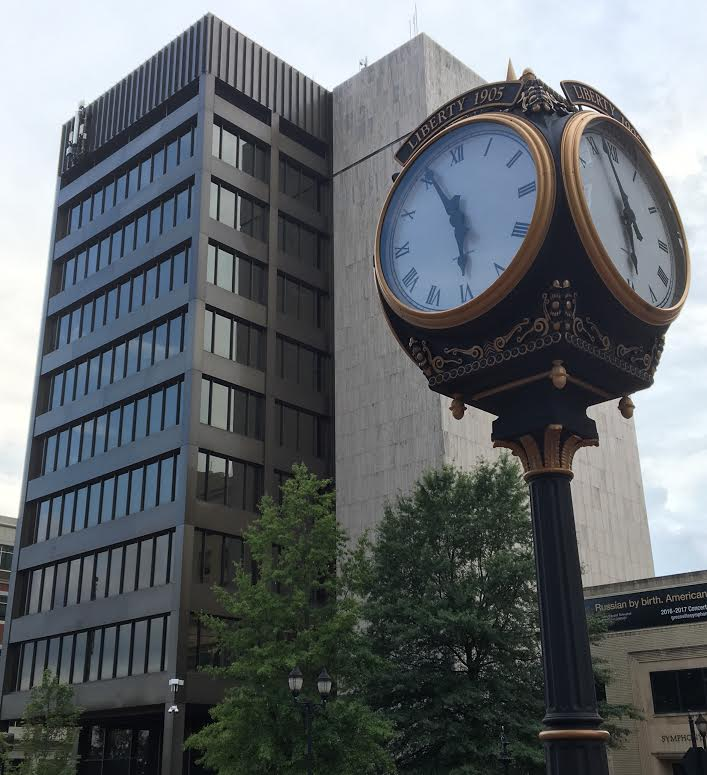
Greenville City Hall

The city of Greenville adopted the Council-Manager form of municipal government in 1976. The Greenville City Council consists of the mayor and six council members. The mayor and two council members are elected at-large while the remaining council members are chosen from single-member districts. Greenville Municipal Court handles criminal misdemeanor violations, traffic violations, and city ordinance violations. As of 2024, the city's mayor is Knox H. White, who has been in that position since December 1995.

Greenville's City Hall has had multiple locations since the first in 1879, including the Old Greenville City Hall, which served in that capacity from 1938 to 1973. In March 2023, the city announced plans to sell its current building and move City Hall to the Bowater Building along the Reedy River in Falls Park.

The Greenville Police Force was established in 1845. By 1876 it became the Greenville Police Department. In 1976 the department moved into the Greenville County Law Enforcement Center with the Greenville County Sheriff's Department. The Greenville Police Department serves Greenville with around 241 employees with 199 sworn officers.

Districts 22–25 of the South Carolina House of Representatives cover portions of Greenville, as do state senate districts 6–8. The city is within South Carolina's 4th congressional district, represented by William Timmons since 2019.

== Education ==
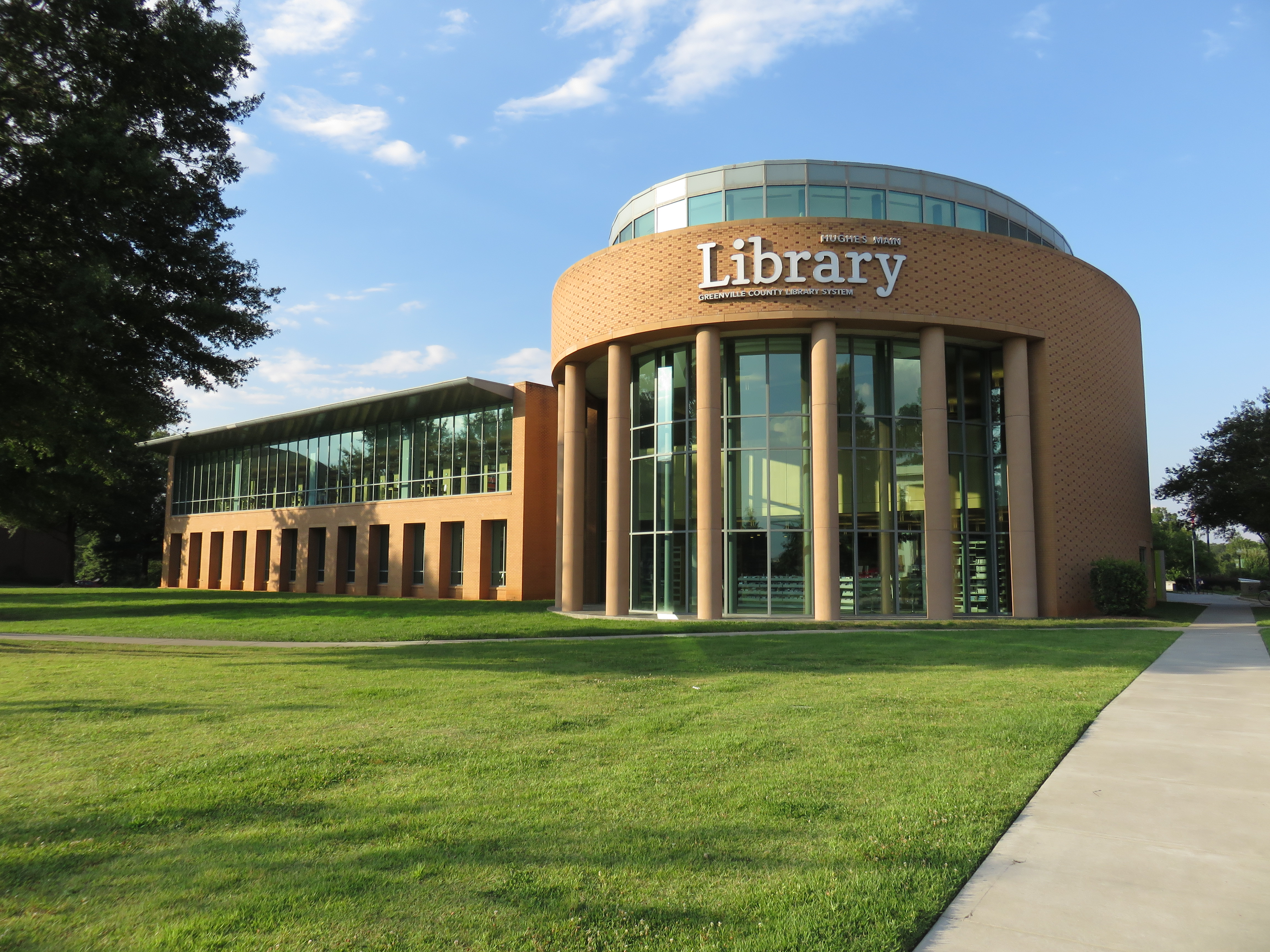
Greenville County Hughes Main Library

=== Primary and secondary ===
The Greenville County School District includes all of the Greenville city limits. The district is the largest school district in the state of South Carolina and is ranked as the 44th largest district in the United States, with 19 high schools, 24 middle schools, and 52 elementary schools. The district's 2018–2023 strategic plan noted it had 10,000 employees, including 6,000 teachers with an average of 12.8 years of experience. In addition to traditional public schools, Greenville's downtown area is home to the South Carolina Governor's School for the Arts & Humanities, a boarding school for young artists.

In addition to public schools, Greenville County has a number of private and religious schools, including St Mary's Catholic School (founded in 1900), Camperdown Academy (for students with learning disabilities), Hidden Treasure Christian School (a school for students with physical and/or mental disabilities), Christ Church Episcopal School (a college-preparatory Episcopalian school with an American school outside of Germany certified by the Bavarian Ministry of Education), Shannon Forest Christian School (an evangelical Christian school), Saint Joseph's Catholic School, Our Lady of the Rosary Catholic School, St. Anthony's Catholic School, Southside Christian School (established in 1967 by Southside Baptist Church), Hampton Park Christian School, Bob Jones Academy and Elementary School, Carolina Film Institute (a film school founded in 2008), Green Charter (originally one of the Gülen movement schools), and Greenville Classical Academy (a classical Christian school established in 2004).

Greenville has numerous public charter schools that are free to state residents.

=== Colleges and universities ===
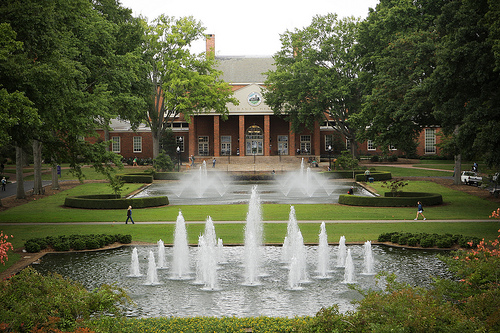
James B. Duke Library at Furman University

Greenville has several colleges and universities located within the city limits: Bob Jones University, Greenville Technical College, and an ECPI University campus. Additionally Furman University and North Greenville University are located in the greater Greenville area. Furman began as Furman Academy and Theological Institution in 1825 named after Richard Furman. The theological school of Furman broke away in 1858 and became Southern Baptist Theological Seminary now in Louisville, Kentucky. North Greenville University was established in 1893 and is affiliated with the South Carolina Baptist Convention. Bob Jones University was established in 1927 by Bob Jones Sr. as a private non-denominational Protestant university. Greenville Technical College was established in 1962 as a technical college. The Evangelical Institute was founded in 1967 just north of the city at Paris Mountain.

Clemson University's Main campus is located 30 miles (48 km) away, however, the university has several programs physically located in Downtown Greenville, as well as a specialty campus in Greenville called Clemson University International Center for Automotive Research that focuses on automotive research.

The University of South Carolina School of Medicine Greenville is a four-year medical school operating on a Prisma Health campus.

The University Center of Greenville, located in the former shopping mall McAlister Square, offers over 70 undergraduate, graduate, and certificate programs from 9 South Carolina universities. The schools that offer degrees in the center are: Anderson University, Bob Jones University, Clemson University, Converse College, Furman University, Greenville Technical College, Lander University, South Carolina State, and University of South Carolina.

== Media ==
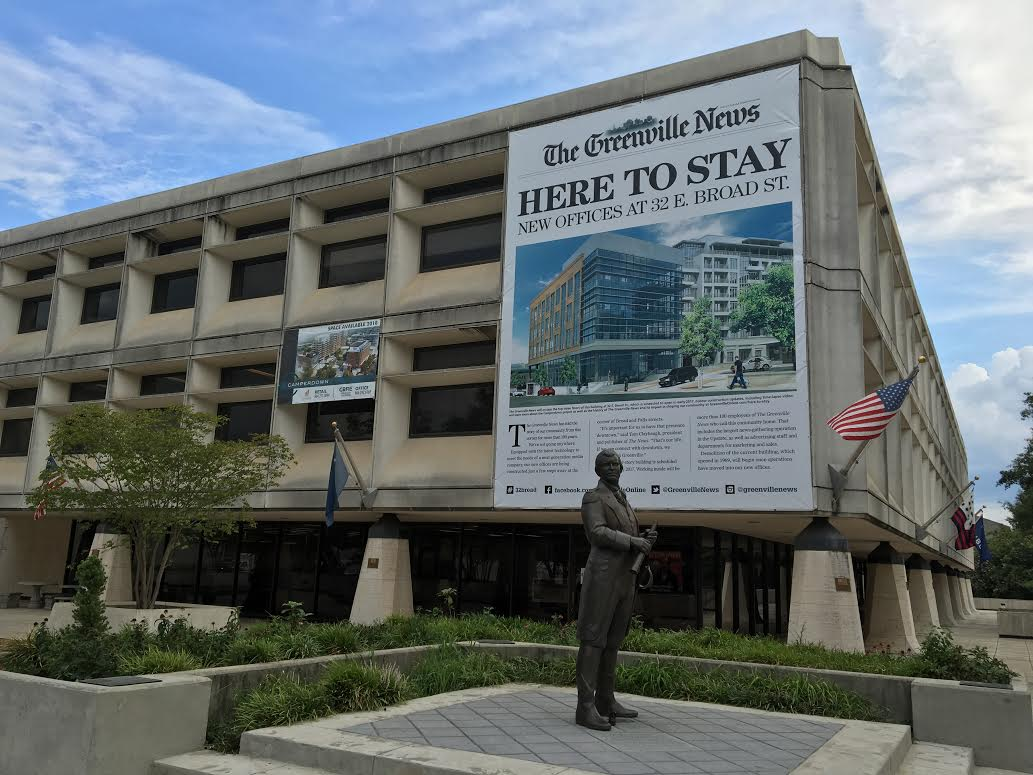
The former Greenville News building

- Greenville Business Magazine, monthly magazine that contains business information for and about the Greenville area
- The Greenville News, the city's daily newspaper and also the Upstate's largest daily newspaper in circulation and readership
- Greenville Journal, weekly newspaper dealing with business, economic development, local events, and current issues relevant to Greenville. It was originally the Greenville Civic and Commercial Journal
- GSA Business, published every two weeks, it covers business news from across the Greenville-Anderson-Greer, SC Metropolitan Statistical Area
- GVLtoday, hyper-local news site operated by Greenville-based media company 6 AM City
- The Post and Courier Greenville, local edition of the Post and Courier daily newspaper based in Charleston, which features "Greenville news reported, written and edited by Greenville journalists for readers in the Upstate"
- Upstate Business Journal, weekly business newspaper reaching 100,000 business leaders in Greenville, Spartanburg, and Anderson counties
- Upstate Link magazine, was a weekly publication that began in January 2004 as part of The Greenville News and remained in print until 2008. It is now defunct.
- ShareGVL (Share Greenville), similar to Humans of New York, it is a nonprofit digital community that humanizes residents of Greenville

=== Radio ===
Greenville is part of the Greenville-Spartanburg-Anderson Arbitron Metro which is the nation's 59th largest radio market with a person 12+ population of 813,700. The box below lists the local radio stations:

=== Television ===
Greenville is part of the Greenville-Spartanburg-Anderson-Asheville DMA, which is the nation's 36th largest television market. See the box below for the local television stations:

== Infrastructure ==
=== Transportation ===
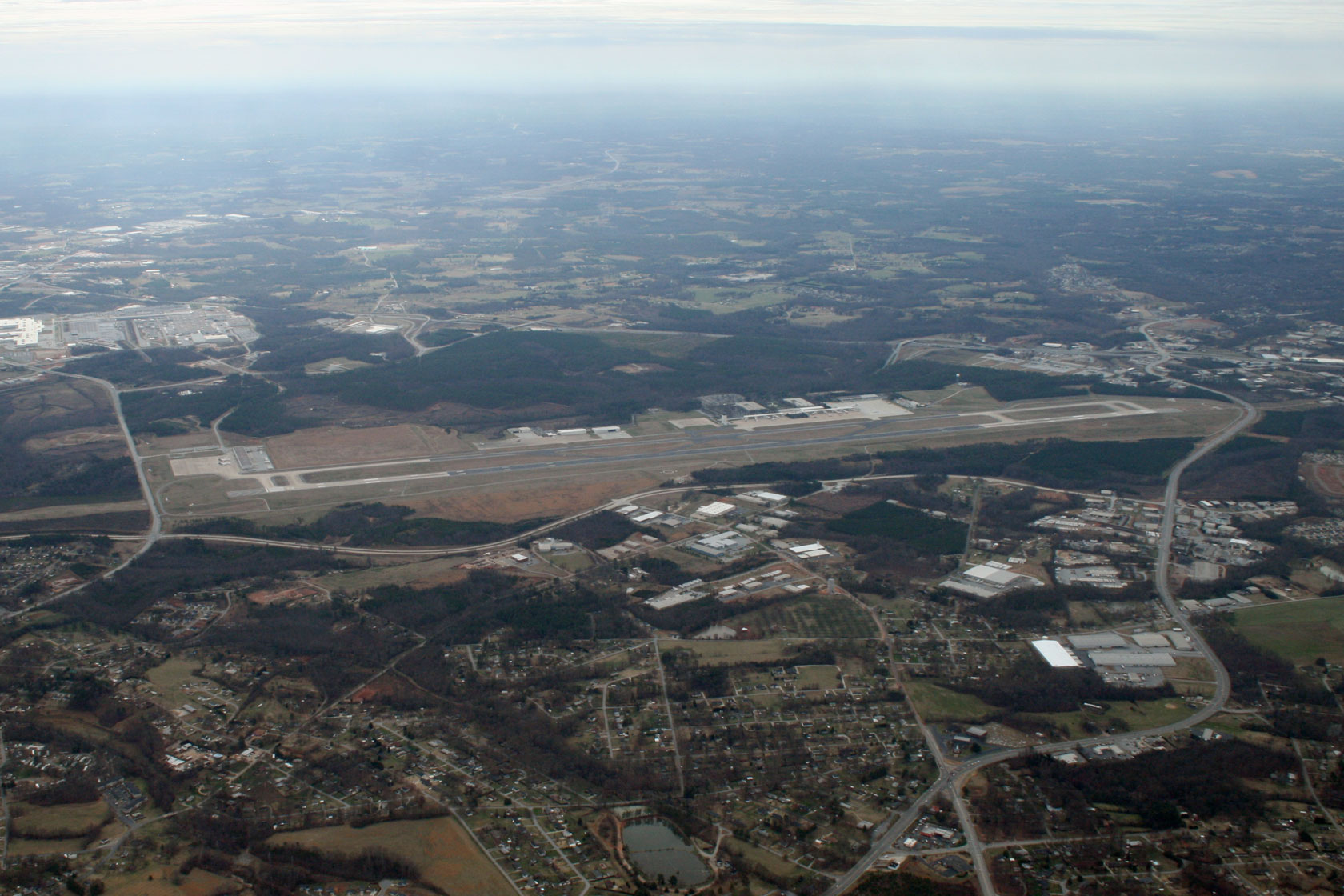
Greenville–Spartanburg International Airport

Greenville is located on the I-85 corridor, approximately halfway between Atlanta and Charlotte. I-85 runs along the city's southeast edge and is connected to downtown Greenville by two spur routes: I-185, which also forms a southern beltway; and I-385, which continues southeast to a junction with I-26. Other major highways include US 123, US 25, US 29 and US 276.

There are several airports servicing the Greenville area. The largest is Greenville-Spartanburg International Airport, which is the third-busiest airport in South Carolina, after Charleston International Airport, and Myrtle Beach International Airport with over 2.56 million passengers in 2023.

SCTAC (formerly Donaldson Air Base) has undergone significant modernization and is the site of multiple industries, as well as the International Transportation and Innovation Center, and the South Carolina Army National Guard Aviation Support Facility. Greenville serves as a freight hub for FedEx Express. The Greenville Downtown Airport, is the busiest general aviation airport in South Carolina with nearly 80,000 take-offs and landings annually and more than 198 based aircraft in 2022.

Public transit in Greenville is handled by the Greenville Transit Authority, which contracted out operations to the City Of Greenville in 2008 under a tri-party agreement with Greenville County. The city rebranded the service with the name Greenlink. Greenlink runs a bus system that serves the Greenville area, much of Greenville County including Mauldin and Simpsonville, and a portion of Pickens County via a connector to Clemson. Greenlink has a 10-year transit plan that aims to cover the entire county with 15 new buses and double the frequency of routes by 2030.

Greenville's train station is served by Amtrak's Crescent train, connecting Greenville with the cities of New York; Philadelphia; Baltimore; Washington, D.C.; Raleigh; Charlotte; Atlanta; Birmingham; and New Orleans. Additionally, Greenville is included in the Southeast High Speed Rail Corridor, which is proposed to run from Washington, D.C. to Jacksonville. Freight railroad service is provided by CSX Transportation, Norfolk Southern Railway, and the Carolina Piedmont Railroad. The abandoned former Greenville & Northern Railway line to Travelers Rest has been converted into a hiking and biking trail called the Swamp Rabbit Trail.

=== Health systems ===
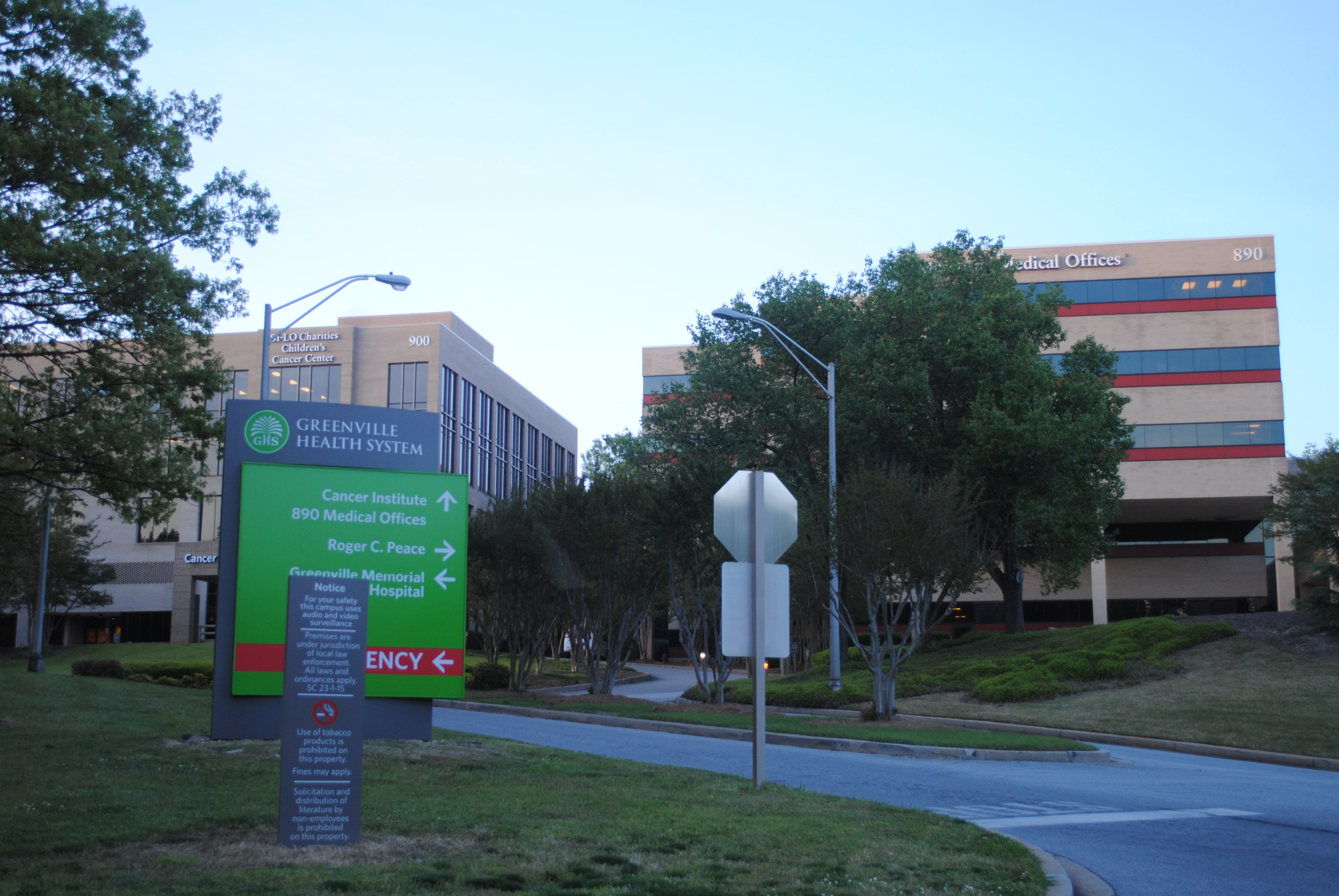
Greenville Memorial Hospital, now operated by Prisma Health

Greenville has two main health systems, Bon Secours and Prisma Health.

Bon Secours St. Francis Health System includes St. Francis Downtown; St. Francis Eastside; and St. Francis Outpatient Center and Upstate Surgery Center.

Prisma Health is a not-for-profit health organization that includes seven campuses in the Upstate area: Greenville Memorial Medical Center, North Greenville Long Term Acute Care Hospital and ER, Hillcrest Hospital, Patewood Memorial Hospital, Greer Memorial Hospital, Laurens County Memorial Hospital, and Oconee Memorial Hospital. It is one of the largest employers in the region. It hosts the University of South Carolina School of Medicine Greenville, a full four-year branch of the medical school in Columbia, South Carolina.

The Greenville Memorial Hospital was formerly operated by the municipal government, with Greenville Health System being the operating authority. In 2016, Prisma Health began leasing the hospital and directly operating it. The GHA is the portion of the Greenville Health System that still existed after the hospital transitioned into being operated by Prisma. The Greenville Health Authority (GHA) is the owner of the hospital facilities operated by Prisma. Members of the South Carolina Legislature select a majority of the seats of the board of directors of the GHA.

Greenville's Shriners Hospital for Children treats pediatric orthopedic patients exclusively, free of charge.

== Notable people ==
- Jaimie Alexander, actress
- Dorothy Allison, writer
- Cat Anderson, jazz trumpeter (1916–1981)
- Rudolf Anderson Jr., the only person killed by enemy fire during the Cuban Missile Crisis
- Daniel Bard, MLB player (Boston Red Sox 2009–2013, Colorado Rockies 2020–2023)
- Zinn Beck, former MLB player; managed the Greenville Spinners from 1923 to 1925
- Josh Boone, soccer player
- Danielle Brooks, actress, grew up in Simpsonville and attended SCGSAH in Greenville
- Peabo Bryson, singer-songwriter
- Carroll A. Campbell, Jr., 112th governor of South Carolina, 1987–1995
- Judith Chapman, actress
- President Chay (1998), American YouTuber known for his DIY videos and vlogs.
- Dextor Clinkscale, safety in the National Football League
- William Wilson Cooke (1871–1949), architect
- Wilson Cooke (1819 –1887), American politician and merchant; born in Greenville
- Santia Deck, athlete
- Jim DeMint, former U.S. senator, president of the Heritage Foundation
- Duke Dennis, Youtuber and AMP collective member
- Austin Ernst, professional golfer
- Esquerita, musician
- Jawun Evans, player in the National Basketball Association
- Tyler Florence, chef and television host
- Kevin Garnett, player in the National Basketball Association, 15-time All-Star, 2004 league MVP, and 2008 champion
- André Goodman, 10-year NFL career as cornerback with Detroit Lions, Miami Dolphins and Denver Broncos
- Trey Gowdy, United States congressman
- Chad Green, Major League Baseball pitcher
- Clement Haynsworth, United States Circuit Judge of the U.S. Court of Appeals 4th Circuit; Supreme Court nominee
- James M. Henderson, advertising executive and Republican candidate for Lieutenant Governor of South Carolina in 1970; father-in-law of Jim DeMint
- George Hincapie, road bicycle racer
- John D. Hollingsworth, textile machinery executive and philanthropist
- Bo Hopkins, television and film actor
- John P. Howard III, Associate Judge of the District of Columbia Court of Appeals.
- Jesse Hughes, rock musician
- Jay Jackson, Major League Baseball pitcher
- Jesse Jackson (1941–2026), civil rights activist and Baptist minister
- Shoeless Joe Jackson, Major League Baseball player
- Bob Jones Sr., evangelist, founder of Bob Jones University
- Bob Jones Jr., second president of Bob Jones University
- Monique Jones, IFBB professional bodybuilder
- Jo Jorgensen, Libertarian nominee in the 2020 United States presidential election
- Marcus King, blues musician, founder of The Marcus King Band
- Nikki Lane, country music singer
- Hovie Lister, gospel musician
- Michael Mercado, Major League Baseball pitcher
- Kaelynn Partlow, American autistic television personality, applied behavior analysis (ABA) paraprofessional
- Joel Roberts Poinsett, physician, diplomat, and slave owner for whom the poinsettia plant is named
- Virginia Postrel, political and cultural author
- Charles V. Pyle Jr., judge and politician
- John E. Sloan, US Army major general
- William Timmons, U.S. representative for South Carolina
- Charles H. Townes, co-recipient of 1964 Nobel Prize in Physics
- Eli White, professional baseball player for the Atlanta Braves
- Josh White (1914–1969) American singer, guitarist, songwriter, actor and civil rights activist

== Sister cities ==
Greenville is twinned with:

- Bergamo, Italy since 1984
- Kortrijk, Belgium since 1991
- Tianjin Free-Trade Zone, China since 2002
- Vadodara, India

== See also ==
- National Register of Historic Places listings in Greenville, South Carolina
