= Santia Deck =

American athlete (born 1991)

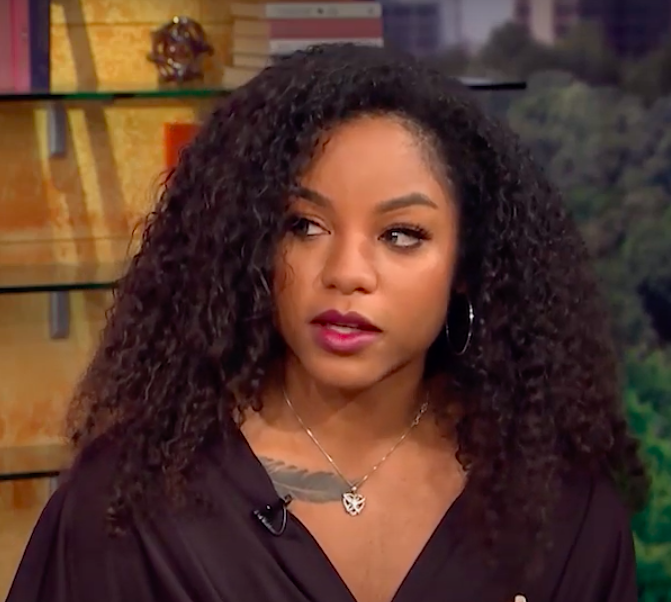
- Deck in 2020

Personal information
- Nationality: American
- Born: November 19, 1991 (age 34) Greenville, South Carolina, U.S.
- Education: Bachelor of Arts in English and Literature; Texas A&M University–Kingsville
- Occupation: Athlete
- Years active: 2019–present
- Height: 5 ft 1 in (155 cm)
- Weight: 135 lb (61 kg)
- Website: www.santiadeck.com

Sport
- Country: United States
- League: Women's Football League Association

Santia Deck (born November 19, 1991) is an American athlete. She started her career as a fitness trainer and gained a following on social media through her workouts and flag football skills. Deck signed a contract in 2019 that would have made her the highest paid female American football player; however, the planned Women's Football League Association never launched.

== Early life and education ==
Deck was born on November 19, 1991, in Greenville, South Carolina, and raised in Houston, Texas. She won a full track and field scholarship to Texas A&M University-Kingsville and graduated with a bachelor's degree in English and literature.

At the age of seven she signed up for a track program during the summer.

== Career ==
In rugby union she played with the Atlanta Harlequins, Stars Rugby 7s and the Bay of Plenty Rugby Union in New Zealand. She was asked to try out for the USA women's team in Rugby sevens at the Summer Olympics of 2020 but an injury occurred.

She joined the Legends Football League (LFL) in 2017.

In December 2019, Deck became the first woman to enter into a professional full tackle football contract with a proposed all-female league -- the Women's Football League Association (WFLA).

Deck is known online as the 'queen of abs' and hosts her own TV talk show Queen of Abs Fitness. She also appeared in Steve Austin's Broken Skull Ranch, and Blind Date.

In July 2020, Deck founded a company called Tronus, which sells sneakers.
