= Spinx =

American convenience store chain

The Spinx Company

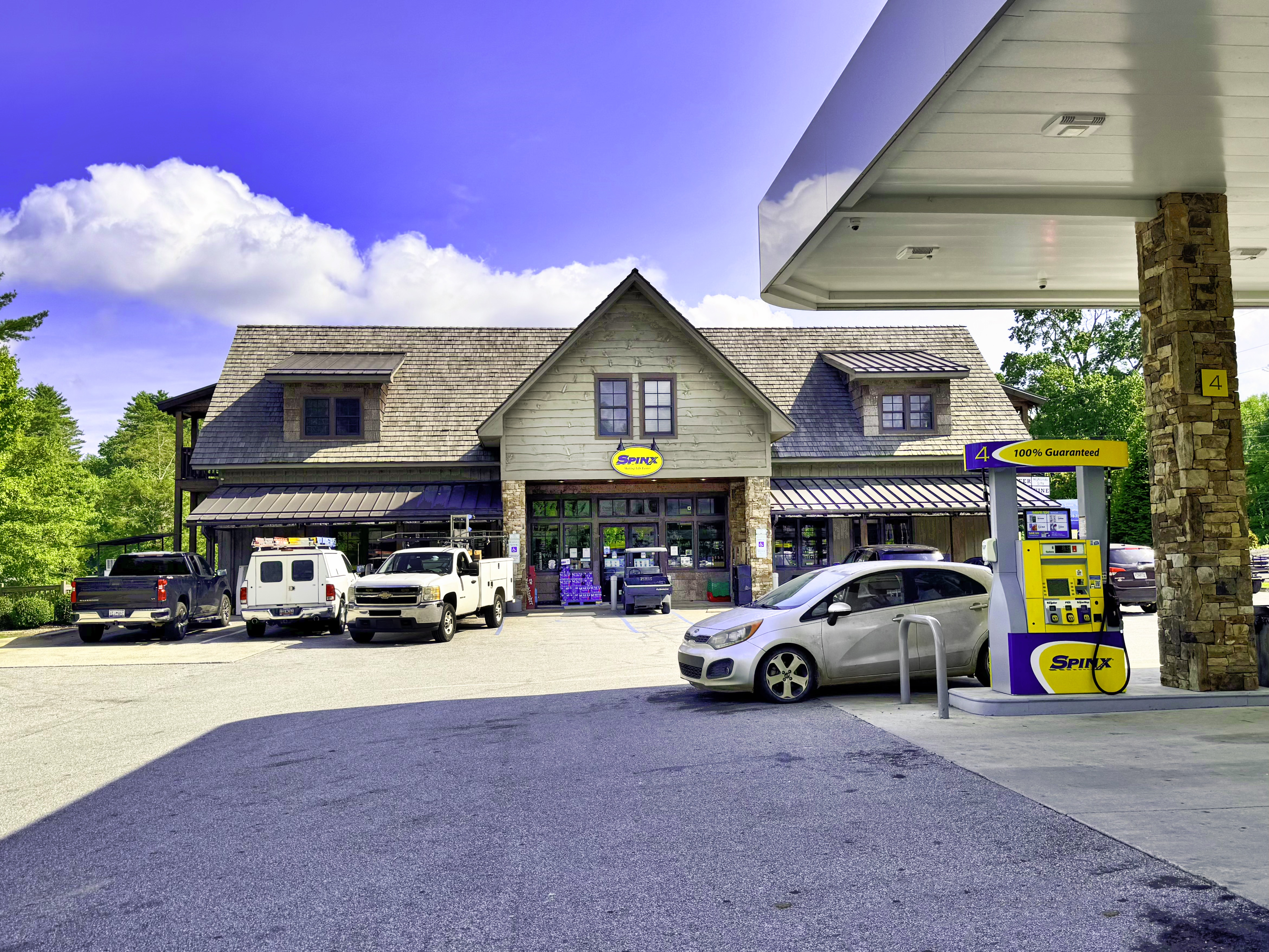
- Spinx in Highlands, North Carolina
- Company type: Private
- Industry: Retail
- Founders: Stewart Spinks
- Headquarters: Greenville, South Carolina, United States
- Number of locations: 80 (July 2023)
- Area served: South Carolina
- Key people: Stewart Spinks
- Products: Coffee; Submarine sandwich; Prepared foods; Gasoline; Beverages; Snacks; Dairy products; Salads
- Services: Convenience store; Gas station; Fast food
- Number of employees: 1,400 (2023)
- Website: www.myspinx.com

Spinx is an American company with multiple gas stations and convenience stores in South Carolina and North Carolina. The company was founded in Greenville, South Carolina in 1972 by Stewart Spinks.

The company name is a word play on the family Spinks and the Sphinx.

== History ==
Founded in 1972, Spinx operates 80 convenience store locations and 50 car washes across South Carolina and North Carolina. The company has also raised money for the American Cancer Society.

The company's gas stations also sell fried chicken, chicken biscuits, and chicken tenders. Writing for It's a Southern Thing, Mary Patterson Boone gave it a negative review, stating "if I'm fantasizing about fast-food fried chicken while eating something claiming to be better because it's the opposite, something isn't quite clicking."
