= Poe Textile Mill =

1896 textile mill in South Carolina, US

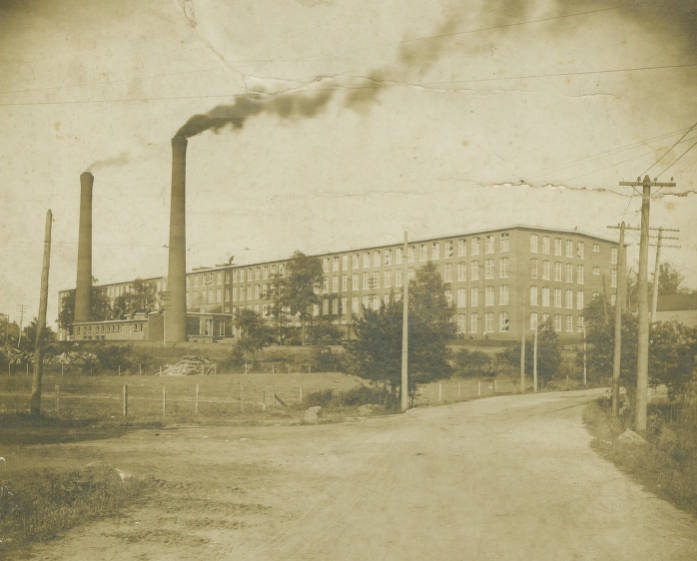
- The Poe Textile Mill in 1909

- Location within South Carolina Location within the United States
- 34°52′16″N 82°24′45″W
- Type: Textile Mill
- Location: 240 A Street, Greenville, South Carolina

History
- Built: 1895-1896
- Built for: F. W. Poe Manufacturing Co.
- Demolished: 2003

Site notes
- Elevation: 950–1,018 ft (290–310 m)
- Area: 11 acres (4.5 ha)
- Architect: Joseph E. Serrine from Lockwood, Greene & Co.

The Poe Textile Mill was a textile mill that was located in Greenville, South Carolina. The mill was founded by F. W. Poe Manufacturing Company and was one of nineteen textile mills in the Greenville Textile Crescent. Although the mill was initially regarded as a "foolish experiment" by some of the public, it became one of the most profitable mills in the Southern United States. The mill closed in 1977 and was destroyed by fires in 2002 and 2003.

== History ==
=== 19th Century ===
In 1895, Poe bought the area for US$10,000 (~$378,000 today) seeing its value from the nearby Southern Railroad, Buncombe Road, and branch of the Reedy River. The area he built it on was originally called Governor's Hill. The mill was established in 1896 and they started operations in March of that year. The building was the first design by Joseph E. Sirrine, who was employed under Lockwood, Greene Co. Poe paid $2,800 ($1,800 as a base price plus 10 cents per spindle) for architecture. The design included a 650' x 104' x 56' main building, 2 smokestacks, 4 floors, electric lights, and a capacity of 10,000 spindles. He also designed a village with 238 mill houses, of which included one Superintendent's house, a parsonage, six overseer's houses, and an assistant treasurer's house. to go the Mill, which often attracted farm families from states like Tennessee, Kentucky, and North Carolina. They hired a local Contractor by the name of Jacob O. Cagle to build the mill. The textile mill was opened with 10,000 spindles, 300 looms, and 400 workers. Since most of the workers and families who lived in the village were farm people, the mill later constructed agricultural buildings such as a cow pasture and hog pen, and one person went as far as even keeping bee hives in his backyard.

=== 20th Century ===
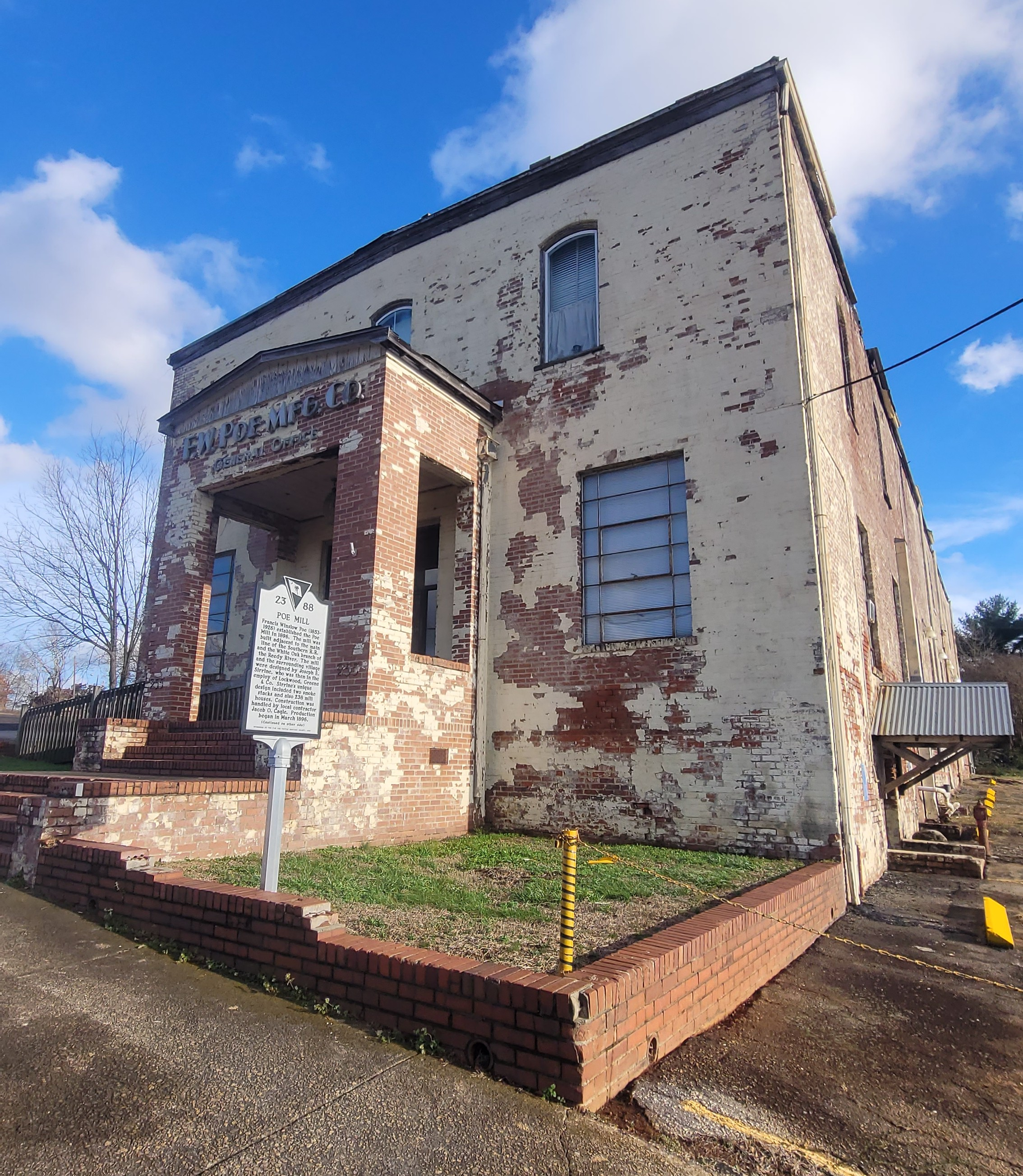
A photo of the General Store with the historical marker in late 2024.

In 1902, Edwards and Walter of Columbia designed a school and church for the village that costed $14,000 (~$514,000 today). In 1911, the mill grew to 70,000 spindles, 1,700 looms, and 800 workers. By the mid 1920s, athletics were extensive with a full-time athletic director, a baseball field, a park, and a swimming pool, all on mill property. Francis Winslow Poe, the owner of the company and mill, died in 1926 so the mill's ownership was transferred to his brother, Nelson Poe. The company that owned the mill, F. W. Poe Manufacturing Co., was put up for receivership in 1936. Seven years after Poe's death, one of the houses in the village burst into flames with 5 casualties and 1 severely wounded, with those people's ages ranging from 5-20. In 1933, a protest in the mill successfully gained the workers a 15% percent pay increase. Protests didn't stop there, as in 1934, the Textile Workers Union of America went on strike because of safety issues in textile mills all across eastern America, though it did not affect the mill a lot as the National Guard was defending the mill with machine guns. The Poe Mill was no exception, as its working conditions were bad and were even known for overexerting their workers. During World War II, the Mill was used to create duck cloth to make tents, with women replacing men in the workforce. After the War, the Mill fell into the hands of Ely & Walker Co. in 1947 which they bought for $5,725,600 (~$81,550,000 today). Ely & Walker Co. soon sold the village in 1950 and then sold the mill to Burlington Industries in 1954. In 1977 Burlington Industries closed the mill which at the time had an annual payroll of $7,000,000. In 1986, LGL Investments bought the area. Over 6 years, it was co-owned by three men from the company, until landing into the hands of Herbert Lapofsky in 1992. When he died in 1994, the area went into dispute, partially due to estate troubles with a Canadian probate court. Without anyone claiming ownership, the mill was ignored and unpaid taxes started building up.

=== 21st Century ===
In 2002, a fire burnt down some of the main building, and was believed to have been arson. It landed into the hands of Clifton Two Partners Corporation in February 2003. In November of that same year, a large fire destroyed the rest of the main building, leaving the 2 smokestacks behind and causing $800,000 of clean-up costs. The nearby area eventually turned into a small DIY skating park, and in 2016, there was a plan to buy the area to expand that skating park to 40,000 square feet but it didn't fall through. In 2019 there was a historical marker put up explaining a little history of Poe Mill. In 2021, Contour Company bought the Poe Mill site for 1 million dollars. They are planning to renovate all 11 acres of it into a more gentrificated town centre that has 428 residential units, 30,000 square feet of commercial space, and an extension to the Swamp Rabbit Trail. In 2022, a man was shot and killed on nearby A Street on July 4th and 3 people were charged and arrested for the crime.

== Poe Village ==
Like many mills in the South, Poe Mill was adjacent to a mill town which was named Poe Village, which F. W. Poe often referred to as his "little New York". Employees living in Poe Village had their days begin with the sound of the mill whistle which began blasting at 5:30 a.m. The whistle would also go off when shifts were to begin and for both lunch and dinnertime. After the mill was abandoned, the area was filled with homeless people, and one person even found a person shot near his house, and for these reasons, many residents called for the mill to be taken down. In 1922, one of the weave room overseers, D. W. League, achieved first-place for the "If I Were Building A Mill" contest hosted by the Southern Textile Bulletin. He won $25 from the competition, beating dozens of other Southern mill employees with his detailed description of how he would build a mill.

In the early 2000s, primarily investors bought the houses, and the people who did buy them to live in them were mostly renters. As of 2023, the village had 188 single-family housing units with a median market value of $58,780.

In 1950, three years after Ely & Walker purchased the mill and village, the village was sold to the workers. This meant that the mill workers could own their own homes and the company wouldn't have to pay security, upkeep, street repair, and recreation. Since 1990, the Greenville County Redevelopment Authority has supplied $2,860,000 for the redevelopment and improving of the village. That agency successfully brought 75% of the homes in the village up to code between 1990 and 1993, introduced a new underground drainage system, and upgraded the streets. In early 2024, a tip to Greenville County deputies revealed a stash of 13 guns, 2 pounds of cocaine, 7 pounds of marijuana, 1.3 grams of meth, 1 gram of crack, and 34,000 dollars stored in the Poe Mill Community and another location.
