= McPherson Park (Greenville, South Carolina) =

Park in Greenville, South Carolina, United States

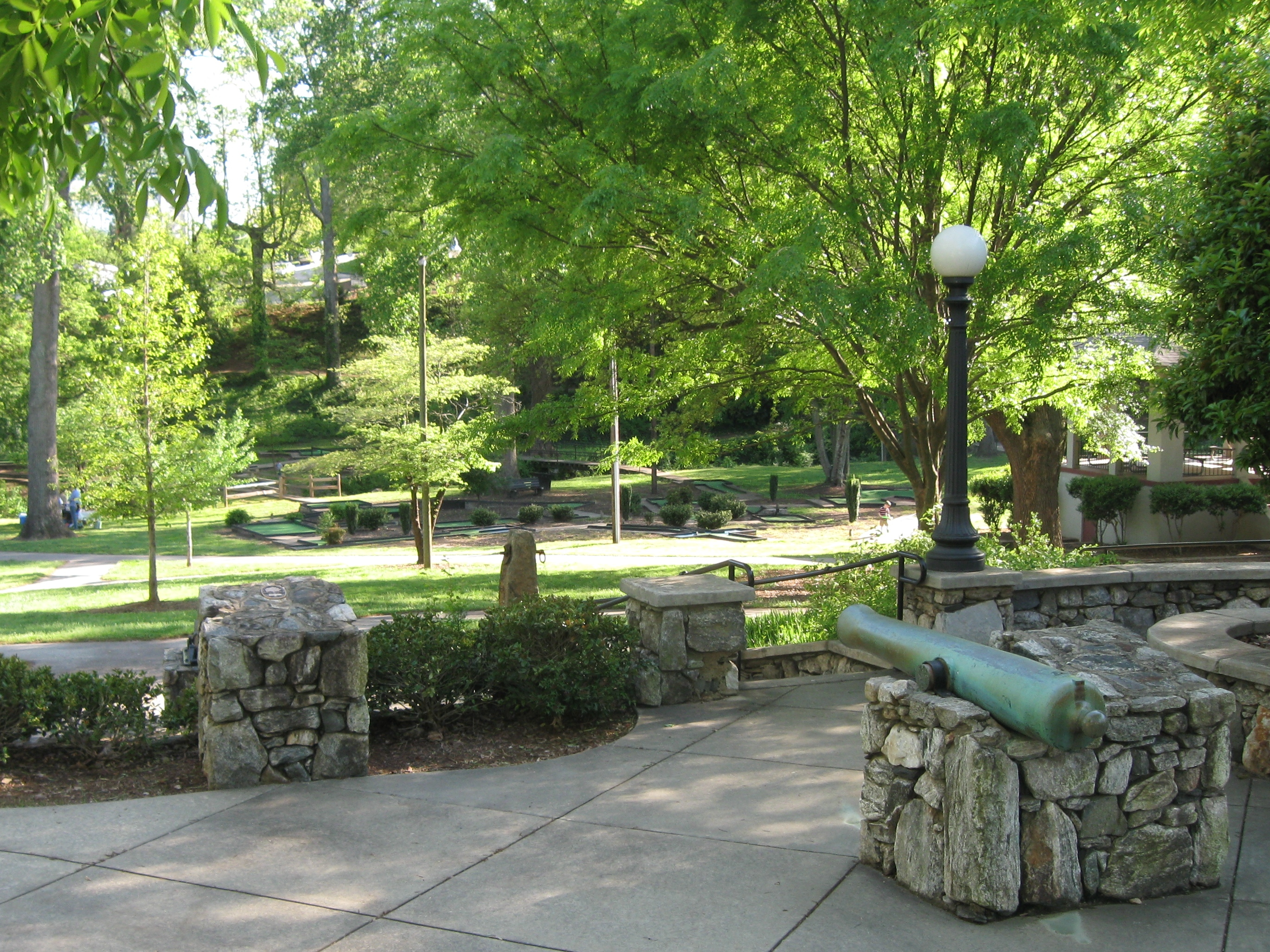
McPherson Park, Greenville, South Carolina

McPherson Park is a historic city park, the oldest in Greenville, South Carolina. As part of the East Park Historic District, the park was added to the National Register of Historic Places on October 4, 2005.

In June 1884, Caroline Cleveland Choice (1811-1905), widow of prominent attorney and political activist, William Choice, donated 2.6 acres, from which the city of Greenville created a park by adding to it 5.7 forested acres it had purchased two years before. Officials built a bandstand, but no other improvements were made until after the turn of the century.

In 1911, businessman, former mayor, and state representative William Choice Cleveland (1883-1946), donated additional land including the site of an old tannery. The park—originally called "City Park"—grew to 32 acres before construction of Academy Street in the early twentieth century reduced it to 12.5 acres. In 1915, the site was used briefly as U. S. Army Camp Blythe; and during World War I, the area included a recruiting office and "makeshift housing for recruits."

By the 1920s, the park "had become central to Greenville life," and it was the site of numerous Sunday school and cotton mill picnics, concerts, dances, and family reunions. From 1935 to 1941, it was renovated by the Works Progress Administration; and in 1941, Sears, Roebuck and Company donated $7,500 toward the building of a stone shelter. That same year, Greenville City Council renamed the park for city engineer John Alexander McPherson (1879-1961) in recognition of his service in developing the city's parks.

During the 1950s, a miniature train for children ran through the park; but with urban encroachment in the 1970s, the train was removed along with a pond and a baseball field. The park also lost twenty acres to new traffic patterns and other public uses. For three years beginning in 1982, improvements in landscaping and lighting were made, and a 1912 bandstand was refurbished. In 2016, the park included walking paths, playgrounds, picnic tables, and shelters, a miniature golf course, lighted tennis courts, a nameless stream crossed by several pedestrian bridges, the Sears Shelter (which hosted dances, public meetings, and community events), and a log cabin, which from 1987 to 2010 served as a consignment shop for the sale of handicrafts made by retirees.
