= Hidden Treasure Christian School =

Private special education school in South Carolina, US

Coordinates: 34.89609°N 82.35087°W

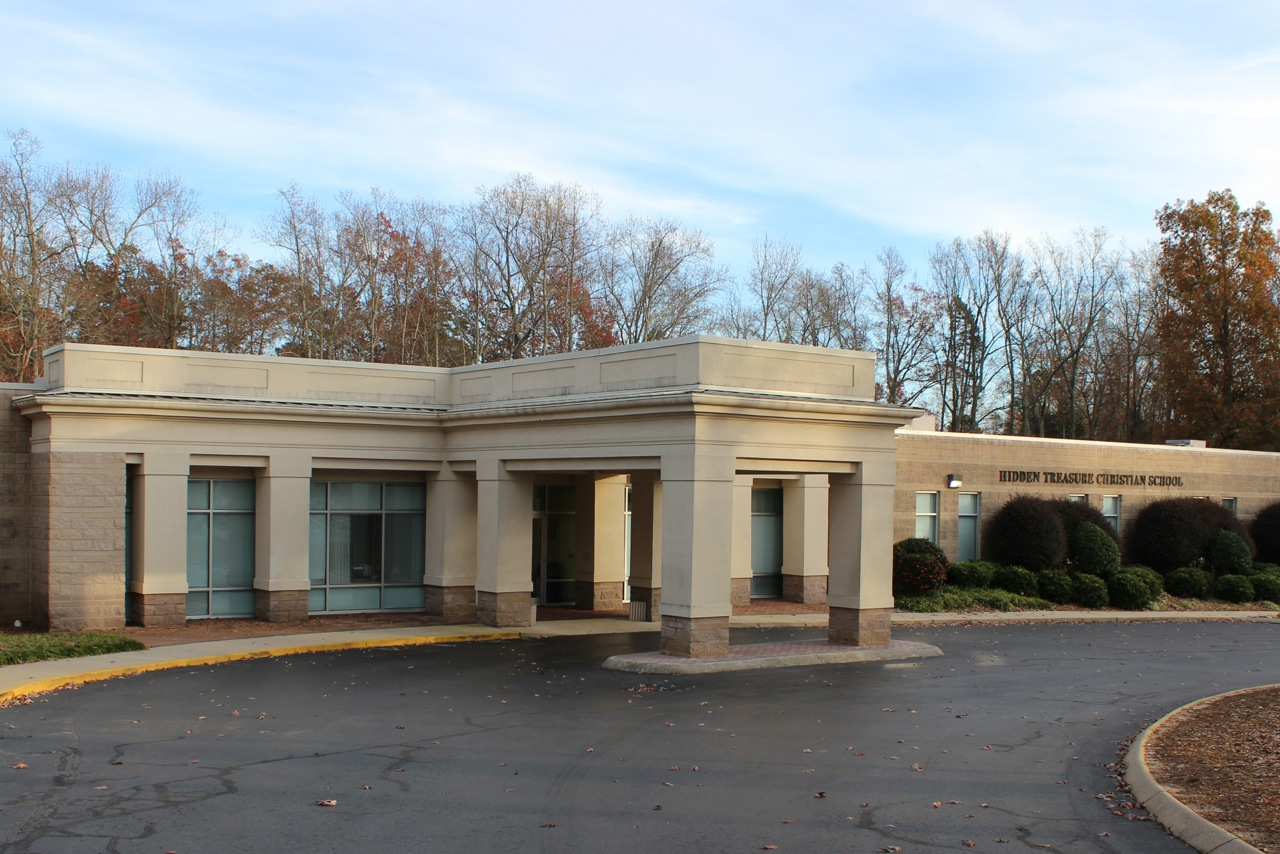
Hidden Treasure Christian School, Taylors, South Carolina

Hidden Treasure Christian School is a private Christian school for special needs children in Taylors, South Carolina, and was probably the first evangelical Christian school in the United States founded to educate both physically and mentally disabled children. The school is a member of the American Association of Christian Schools.

== History ==
The school was organized in 1981 by the Rev. John Vaughn (b. 1948), pastor of Faith Baptist Church, following a 1978 house fire that severely burned his wife and two-year-old daughter, Becky. Vaughn was encouraged to start the school by the Rev. Bill Maher (1928–2002), an evangelist with cerebral palsy and a significant speech impediment.

== Facilities ==
For twenty years the school was located on Hammett Street in Greenville before moving, in 2000, to the Faith Baptist Church campus on West Lee Road in Taylors. The current 28,500-square-foot building includes classrooms, offices, a chapel/cafetorium, a technology center, a speech therapy room, a testing room, a home economics lab, a teachers’ lounge and workroom, and an apartment used to simulate daily living situations. John McCormick (b. 1954), an Ed.D. graduate of Bob Jones University, has served as administrator for more than thirty years.

== Curriculum and finances ==
The school has emphasized both a low student-teacher ratio and an Individual Educational Plan (IEP) for each child. Teachers taught three to eight students, often with the aid of an assistant. The school began with two students in 1981. By 1982, it had four, in 1989, thirty-eight, and in 2002 eighty-five, with thirty children on a waiting list. School enrollment peaked at ninety-four students in 2003. After Hidden Treasure increased tuition in 2004, enrollment dipped, then rebounded; but during the Great Recession, enrollment declined significantly. Hidden Treasure students have included K5, elementary, junior high, and senior high school–aged children.

About half the school budget is derived from tuition with the remainder raised through private and corporate donations. Families from at least fifteen states have moved to the Greenville area to enroll their children, and several teachers also relocated to teach at the school.

== Notability ==
In 1997, a national radio show featured Vaughn and the school, and former Gov. Jeb Bush, Former Gov. Mike Huckabee, Sen. Tim Scott, and presidential candidate Steve Forbes have visited. Bush praised Hidden Treasure as an example of the positive benefit of school choice, and Scott provided an internship for a graduate at his Greenville office.
