= Josh Boone (soccer) =

Filipino-American soccer player

Joshua Boone
Personal information
- Full name: Joshua Kent Boone
- Date of birth: December 5, 1992 (age 33)
- Place of birth: Greenville, South Carolina, United States
- Height: 5 ft 9 in (1.75 m)
- Position: Midfielder

Team information
- Current team: Wehen Wiesbaden U23

Youth career
- 2011: UNC Wilmington Seahawks

Senior career*
Years	Team	Apps	(Gls)
2012	Dayton Dutch Lions	1	(0)
2012	Pasargad		
2013	SpVgg 05 Bad Homburg	15	(1)
2013–	Wehen Wiesbaden U23		
- * Club domestic league appearances and goals as of 26 May 2013

Joshua Kent "Josh" Boone (born December 5, 1992, in Greenville, South Carolina) is a Filipino-American soccer player, currently playing for Wehen Wiesbaden U23 in Germany. He qualifies for the Philippines through his grandmother.
