= South Carolina Highway 89 =

Former state highway in South Carolina, United States

South Carolina Highway 89

Route information
- Maintained by SCDOT
- Existed: 1940–1947

Major junctions
- West end: SC 8 in Easley
- East end: SC 135 in Easley

Location
- Country: United States
- State: South Carolina
- Counties: Pickens

Highway system
- South Carolina State Highway System; Interstate; US; State; Scenic
← SC 88	→ SC 90

South Carolina Highway 89 (SC 89) was a state highway that existed in the southeastern part of Pickens County. Its entire path was in the northern part of Easley.

== Route description ==
SC 89 began at an intersection with SC 8 in the northwestern part of the city. It traveled to the east-northeast and reached its eastern terminus, an intersection with SC 135.

== History ==
SC 89 was established in 1940. It was decommissioned in 1947 and was downgraded to a secondary road. Today, it is known as Fleetwood Drive.

== Major intersections ==
The entire route was in Pickens County.

Location	mi	km	Destinations	Notes
Easley	0.00	0.00	SC 8	Western terminus
Easley	0.95	1.53	SC 135	Eastern terminus
1.000 mi = 1.609 km; 1.000 km = 0.621 mi
