= Greenville and Knoxville Railway =

South Carolina railroad company

The Greenville and Knoxville Railway was a South Carolina railroad company that operated in the western part of the state in the early part of the 20th century.

The Greenville and Knoxville traces its history back to the Carolina, Knoxville and Western Railway which began operation in the late 1880s. However, the line was unsuccessful and abandoned until the Greenville and Knoxville was incorporated in 1904 and took over the route.

The Greenville and Knoxville was sold at foreclosure 10 years later, after which it was renamed the Greenville and Western Railroad in 1914. It was renamed again in 1920 as the Greenville and Northern Railway.
