= South Carolina Highway 87 =

Former state highway in South Carolina, United States

South Carolina Highway 87

Route information
- Maintained by SCDOT
- Existed: 1940–1947

Major junctions
- West end: SC 13 in Central
- US 76 / SC 28 in Pendleton; SC 88 in Pendleton; US 178 north of Northlake
- East end: SC 81 northwest of Aaron

Location
- Country: United States
- State: South Carolina
- Counties: Pickens, Anderson

Highway system
- South Carolina State Highway System; Interstate; US; State; Scenic
← SC 86	→ SC 88

South Carolina Highway 87 (SC 87) was a state highway that existed in the northern part of Anderson County and the southwestern part of Pickens County. It connected rural areas of Anderson County with Pendleton and Central.

== Route description ==
SC 87 began at an intersection with SC 13 (now SC 93) in Central. It headed nearly due south to Pendleton, where it first intersected US 76/SC 28 (now SC 28 Business) and then following those two highway until it met the western terminus of SC 88. It headed southeast to an intersection with US 178, north of Northlake. It then headed to the east-southeast until it met its eastern terminus, an intersection with SC 81, northwest of Aaron.

== History ==
SC 87 was established between US 178 and SC 81. In 1942, it was extended through Pendleton to its western terminus. It was decommissioned in 1947 and was downgraded to secondary roads. Today, parts of it is known as Harris Bridge Road, Lebanon Road, and Issaqueena Trail.

== Major intersections ==
County	Location	mi	km	Destinations	Notes
Pickens	Central			SC 13	Western terminus; now SC 93
Anderson	Pendleton			US 76 west / SC 28 west	Western end of US 76/SC 28 concurrency; now SC 28 Bus. west
Anderson	Pendleton			US 76 east / SC 28 east	Eastern end of US 76/SC 28 concurrency; now SC 28 Bus. east
Anderson	Pendleton			SC 88 east	Western terminus of SC 88
Anderson				US 178	
Anderson				SC 81	Eastern terminus
1.000 mi = 1.609 km; 1.000 km = 0.621 mi: Concurrency terminus
