= South Carolina Highway 135 =

State highway in South Carolina, United States

South Carolina Highway 135

Route information
- Maintained by SCDOT
- Length: 20.920 mi (33.667 km)

Major junctions
- West end: US 178 near Liberty
- US 123 in Easley
- East end: SC 8 near Pumpkintown

Location
- Country: United States
- State: South Carolina
- Counties: Pickens

Highway system
- South Carolina State Highway System; Interstate; US; State; Scenic
← SC 133	→ SC 137

South Carolina Highway 135 (SC 135) is a 20.920-mile-long (33.667 km) state highway in the U.S. state of South Carolina. The highway travels through mostly rural areas of Pickens County.

== Route description ==
SC 135 begins at an intersection with U.S. Route 178 (US 178, Moorefield Memorial Highway) southeast of Liberty within Pickens County. It travels to the northeast and crosses Carmel Creek before entering Easley. The highway has a brief concurrency with SC 8 (Pelzer Highway). A very short distance after SC 8 splits off onto South 5th Street, the highway has an interchange with U.S. Route 123 (US 123; Calhoun Memorial Highway). It passes a U.S. Post Office and Gettys Middle School before intersecting SC 93 (Main Street). It immediately crosses over railroad tracks and turns right onto NE Main Street. One block later, it turns left onto North A Street. It crosses over Georges Creek and Mud Dog Branch before leaving the city limits of the city. SC 135 travels in a fairly northerly direction and crosses over Burdine Creek. It has an intersection with SC 183 (Farrs Bridge Road) and SC 186 (Earls Bridge Road). It begins traveling to the north-northwest and crosses over Shoal Creek. It curves to the northwest and crosses over Carpenter Creek. South of Pumpkintown, it crosses over Adams Creek and meets its northern terminus, another intersection with SC 8 (Pumpkintown Highway).

== Major intersections ==
The entire route is in Pickens County.

Location	mi	km	Destinations	Notes
	0.000	0.000	US 178 (Moorefield Memorial Highway) – Anderson, Liberty	
Easley	5.750	9.254	SC 8 south (Pelzer Highway) – Pelzer	Southern end of SC 8 concurrency
Easley	6.250	10.058	SC 8 north (South 5th Street)	Northern end of SC 8 concurrency
Easley	6.480	10.429	US 123 (Calhoun Memorial Highway) to SC 8 – Clemson, Greenville	Interchange
Easley	7.310	11.764	SC 93 (Main Street) – Liberty, Greenville	
	11.410	18.363	SC 183 (Farrs Bridge Road) – Pickens, Greenville	
	14.720	23.690	SC 186 (Earls Bridge Road) – Pickens, Dacusville	
	20.920	33.667	SC 8 (Pumpkintown Highway) – Pickens, Table Rock	
1.000 mi = 1.609 km; 1.000 km = 0.621 mi: Concurrency terminus
