= South Carolina Highway 186 =

State highway in South Carolina

South Carolina Highway 186

Route information
- Maintained by SCDOT
- Length: 14.960 mi (24.076 km)

Major junctions
- West end: SC 8 near Pickens
- SC 135 near Dacusville
- East end: US 276 in Slater-Marietta

Location
- Country: United States
- State: South Carolina
- Counties: Pickens, Greenville

Highway system
- South Carolina State Highway System; Interstate; US; State; Scenic
← SC 185	→ SC 187

South Carolina Highway 186 (SC 186) is a 14.960-mile-long (24.076 km) state highway in the U.S. state of South Carolina. The highway connects rural areas of Pickens County with Slater-Marietta in Greenville County.

== Route description ==
SC 186 begins at an intersection with SC 8 (Pumpkintown Highway) northeast of Pickens, within Pickens County. It travels to the east-northeast and curves to the southeast before crossing over Shoal Creek. Farther to the east is an intersection with SC 135 (Dacusville Highway). The highway curves to the northeast and travels through Dacusville. SC 186 curves to the north and crosses over Shoal Creek again. It curves to the northeast and crosses over the Saluda River on an unnamed bridge, which marks the Greenville County line. Upon crossing over Beaverdam Creek, the highway enters Slater-Marietta. A short distance later, it meets its eastern terminus, an intersection with U.S. Route 276 (US 276; Geer Highway).

== Major intersections ==
County	Location	mi	km	Destinations	Notes
Pickens		0.000	0.000	SC 8 (Pumpkintown Highway) – Pumpkintown, Table Rock	Western terminus
Pickens		4.950	7.966	SC 135 (Dacusville Highway) – Easley, Table Rock	
Greenville	Slater-Marietta	14.960	24.076	US 276 (Geer Highway) – Greenville	Eastern terminus
1.000 mi = 1.609 km; 1.000 km = 0.621 mi
