= South Carolina Highway 288 =

State highway in South Carolina, United States

South Carolina Highway 288

Route information
- Maintained by SCDOT
- Length: 15.260 mi (24.559 km)

Major junctions
- West end: US 178 near Sunset
- SC 8 in Pumpkintown
- East end: US 276 in Slater-Marietta

Location
- Country: United States
- State: South Carolina
- Counties: Pickens, Greenville

Highway system
- South Carolina State Highway System; Interstate; US; State; Scenic
← SC 284	→ SC 290

South Carolina Highway 288 (SC 288) is a 15.260-mile-long (24.559 km) state highway in the U.S. state of South Carolina. The highway connects Pumpkintown and Slater-Marietta.

== Route description ==
SC 288 begins at an intersection with U.S. Route 178 (US 178; Moorefield Memorial Highway) east-northeast of Sunset within Pickens County. It travels to the east-northeast and crosses the Oolenoy River and Mill Creek. Farther to the east is a crossing of Carrick Creek just before entering Pumpkintown. There, it intersects SC 8 (Pumpkintown Highway). Just to the east of town is a crossing of Weaver Creek. Then, the highway crosses over Gowens Creek and curves to the east just before going over the South Saluda River. This river marks the Greenville County line. Just before it enters Slater-Marietta, it crosses the Middle Saluda River. Very shortly after entering town, it meets its eastern terminus, an intersection with US 276 (Geer Highway). This intersection is just to the east of Slater Marietta Elementary School and Jimi Turner Park.

== Major intersections ==
County	Location	mi	km	Destinations	Notes
Pickens		0.000	0.000	US 178 (Moorefield Memorial Highway) to SC 11 – Table Rock, Rosman	Western terminus
Pickens	Pumpkintown	6.240	10.042	SC 8 (Pumpkintown Highway) – Pickens, Easley	
Greenville	Slater-Marietta	15.260	24.559	US 276 (Geer Highway) – Travelers Rest, Cleveland	Eastern terminus
1.000 mi = 1.609 km; 1.000 km = 0.621 mi: Concurrency terminus
