= Greenville and Northern Railway =

Overview
- Headquarters: Greenville, South Carolina
- Reporting mark: GRN
- Locale: Upstate South Carolina
- Dates of operation: 1920–1998
- Successor: None (Abandoned)

Technical
- Track gauge: 4 ft 8 1/2 in (1,435 mm) (standard gauge)
- Length: 11.3 miles (18.2 km)

The Greenville and Northern Railroad (reporting mark GRN) was a shortline railroad formerly operating between Travelers Rest and Greenville, South Carolina, 11.3 miles (18.2 km). The railroad was part of the Pinsly Railroad Company after 1957 before being purchased by RailTex in 1997. Operations ended in February 1998 and the railroad was abandoned in 2005.

== History ==
The Carolina, Knoxville and Western Railway completed construction of the railroad north out of Greenville in 1887, reaching Marietta in November 1888 and River Falls in March 1899. The railroad was not successful and was abandoned until 1904 when the Greenville and Knoxville Railroad was formed to reopen the line. In 1914 the railroad once again reorganized as the Greenville and Western Railroad, and rechartered as the Greenville and Northern in 1920. After being cut back to Travelers Rest the remaining line was purchased by the Pinsly Railroad Company in July 1957.

Primary traffic included scrap, cotton waste, vermiculite, peat moss, paper, lumber, and chemicals, generating approximately 2,000 carloads in 1993. Annual carloads over the line declined from 1,642 in 1994 to 1,066 by 1996. The railroad interchanged with Norfolk Southern and CSX Transportation at Greenville near the end of its life, as well as numerous predecessor railroads to both companies.

On April 24, 1997, the Carolina Piedmont Railroad acquired the entire line from Greenville to Travelers Rest and on May 28, 1999, Greenville County purchased the Greenville and Northern from the Carolina Piedmont Railroad. The railroad was abandoned in 2005 and was converted for use as the Swamp Rabbit Trail rail trail which opened in 2010.
