= Interstate 185 (South Carolina) =

Highway in South Carolina

Interstate 185
- I-185 highlighted in red

Route information
- Auxiliary route of I-85
- Maintained by SCDOT
- Length: 17.7 mi (28.5 km)
- Existed: 1962–present
- NHS: Entire route

Major junctions
- South end: I-385 / US 276 south of Mauldin
- US 25 east of Golden Grove; I-85 / US 29 northwest of Gantt; US 25 near Dunean
- North end: US 29 in Greenville

Location
- Country: United States
- State: South Carolina
- Counties: Greenville

Highway system
- Interstate Highway System; Main; Auxiliary; Suffixed; Business; Future; South Carolina State Highway System; Interstate; US; State; Scenic
← SC 185	→ SC 186

Interstate 185 (I-185) is a 17.7-mile (28.5 km) auxiliary Interstate Highway located entirely in Greenville County, South Carolina. I-185 serves as a spur route of I-85 into the city of Greenville as well as a shortcut route for drivers accessing I-385 from northbound I-85. A portion of this road south of I-85 is tolled and is known as the "Southern Connector". Together with a portion of I-385, it forms a partial beltway through Greenville's southern suburbs.

== Route description ==
I-185's northern portion starts at an at-grade intersection at Henrydale Avenue. North of this intersection, US Highway 29 (US 29) continues as Mills Avenue into downtown Greenville. I-185 travels south with two lanes in each direction to its junction with I-85. At this junction, I-185 has only one lane of thru traffic each way; south of the junction, I-185 returns to two lanes in each direction. In addition, US 29 leaves I-185 and travels concurrently with I-85 for eight miles (13 km).

South of exit 12, I-185 has a toll in each direction, with one lane in each direction dedicated for travelers with the Palmetto Pass. At exit 10 (South Carolina Highway 20 [SC 20]), travelers exiting northbound I-185 and entering southbound I-185 also are tolled. At this point, I-185 leaves the Greenville city limits and enters Golden Grove. Just north of exit 7 (US 25), I-185 reenters Greenville.

At exit 4 (Fork Shoals Road), travelers exiting southbound I-185 and entering northbound I-185 are tolled. South of this interchange is another toll plaza for both directions, again with one lane in each direction for drivers with the Palmetto Pass.

Near the end of I-185's southern terminus at I-385, I-185 enters Mauldin. Exit 1A on I-185 northbound, Neely Ferry Road, allows access to Discovery Island. I-185 then splits; one lane exits rights and merges with I-385 southbound while other traffic continues straight to merge with I-385 northbound. Traffic toward I-385 northbound also can exit on SC 417, an exit with no number. At the merge with I-385 northbound, I-185 shrinks to one lane. I-185 ends here.

== History ==
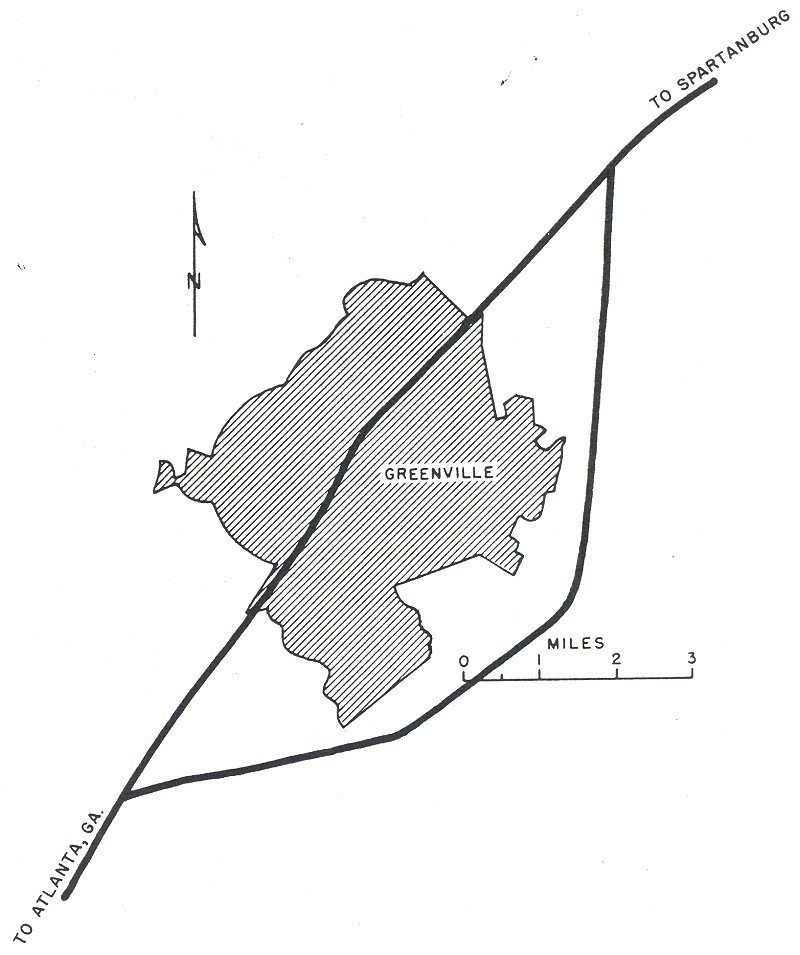
I-185 was planned as part of a continuous route through Greenville on this 1955 map.

The northern portion, which runs from I-85 to the Greenville city limits, was opened in the 1960s and is cosigned with US 29. The southern portion, which connects the I-85/I-185 interchange (exit 42) with the I-385/US 276 interchange (exit 30), was opened as a toll road in 2001. This extension was dubbed the "Southern Connector" and increased I-185 from three to 17 miles (27 km) in length.

=== Southern Connector ===
The Southern Connector was constructed as a public–private partnership between the South Carolina Department of Transportation (SCDOT) and Interwest Carolina Transportation Group, LLC, a development team that included a not-for-profit corporation called Connector 2000 Association, Inc. (C2A). Under this agreement, C2A operates the toll road under a 50-year license. They were responsible for financing, designing, constructing, operating, and maintaining the road during this period and the toll revenue would be used to pay them for these efforts. To finance the project, C2A sold bonds that were tax-exempt under Internal Revenue Service Rule 63-20, which provides that the bonds sold will be exempt if they finance an activity which is "public in nature".

The highway opened in February 2001, nine months ahead of schedule. By 2007, the Connector 2000 Association was having financial difficulties because ridership on the toll road was not meeting original estimates. In late 2007, the association began looking for a concessionaire to take over the operation and financial liability of the toll road. By early 2008, C2A had received a default notice from their bond trustee In January 2010, the bond trustee missed an interest payment, and the C2A was more than $8 million (equivalent to $11.2 million in 2024) behind in its payments to SCDOT for the maintenance and license fees under their agreement. On June 24, 2010, the Southern Connector filed for bankruptcy.

The corporation emerged from bankruptcy on March 28, 2011, by restructuring bond debt and their concession and maintenance agreement with SCDOT. Tolls were raised on January 2, 2012, as part of the settlement.

In 2016, the Southern Connector surpassed 75 million toll transactions since its inception. Between the two main toll plazas, the speed limit has been raised to 70 mph (110 km/h).

== Tolls ==
There are two toll plazas located along the Southern Connector, known as the east and west plazas. Toll booths are located on entrance/exit ramps on Fork Shoals Road (exit 4) and Piedmont Highway (exit 10). The toll plazas have both electronic toll collection (ETC) and cash lanes; toll booths located on ramps accept only ETC or exact change only. Those that do not have exact change or do not pay the toll can fill out a "Pledge Payment Form"; violators have 30 days to remit payment before administrative fees are added to the toll due.

Palmetto Pass is the only form of electronic toll collection accepted on the Southern Connector.

=== Toll rates ===
Toll rates, as of January 2, 2024.

Location	Payment	2 axles	3 axles	4 axles	5 axles	6+ axles
East Plaza	Cash	$2.25	$4.80	$6.40	$8.00	$9.60
East Plaza	Pal Pass	$2.15	$4.56	$6.08	$7.60	$9.12
Fork Shoals Road northbound entrance/southbound exit ramps	Cash	$1.50				
Fork Shoals Road northbound entrance/southbound exit ramps	Pal Pass	$1.50				
SC 20 (Piedmont Highway) northbound exit/southbound entrance ramps	Cash	$1.50				
SC 20 (Piedmont Highway) northbound exit/southbound entrance ramps	Pal Pass	$1.50				
West Plaza	Cash	$2.25	$4.80	$6.40	$8.00	$9.60
West Plaza	Pal Pass	$2.15	$4.56	$6.08	$7.60	$9.12

== Exit list ==
The entire route is in Greenville County.

Location	mi	km	Exit	Destinations	Notes
	−1.49	−2.40		I-385 north – Greenville, Spartanburg, Mauldin	Continuation beyond southern terminus; I-385 exit 31
	−0.81	−1.30	31A	SC 417 (Laurens Road) – Simpsonville, Mauldin	Exit number based on I-385 mileage, unnumbered southbound; no southbound entrance
	0.00– 0.03	0.00– 0.048	1B	I-385 south – Columbia	Southbound exit and northbound entrance; I-385 exit 30
	0.28	0.45	1A	Neely Ferry Road / E. Standing Springs Road	Southbound exit and northbound entrance; entrance ramp includes direct entrance from US 276
	1.79	2.88	East Toll plaza		
	3.77	6.07	4	Fork Shoals Road	Tolled northbound exit ramp, southbound on ramp
	6.63	10.67	7	US 25 (Augusta Road) – Ware Place, Greenville	Signed as exits 7A (north) and 7B (south) northbound
Golden Grove	9.74– 9.76	15.68– 15.71	10	SC 20 (Piedmont Highway) – Greenville, Piedmont	Tolled southbound exit ramp, northbound on ramp
	10.62	17.09	West Toll plaza		
	11.61– 11.64	18.68– 18.73	12	SC 153 north to US 123 – Easley, Clemson	Southern terminus of SR 153
	13.68– 13.69	22.02– 22.03	14	I-85 / US 29 south – Spartanburg, Atlanta	Southern end of US 29 concurrency; signed as exits 14A (north) and 14B (south)
	14.96– 14.99	24.08– 24.12	15	US 25 (White Horse Road) – Travelers Rest	Northbound exit and southbound entrance
Dunean	15.36– 15.44	24.72– 24.85	16	US 25 / SC 20 (Grove Road) – Piedmont	Southbound exit and northbound entrance
Greenville	16.40	26.39	–	US 29 north (Mills Avenue) / Henrydale Avenue – Greenville	Northern end of US 29 concurrency; at-grade intersection; northern terminus
1.000 mi = 1.609 km; 1.000 km = 0.621 mi: Concurrency terminus; Incomplete access; Tolled
