= SC-8 =

SC8, SC.8, SC 8, SC-8 or variants may refer to:

- SC-08, South Carolina's 8th congressional district
- SC 8, South Carolina Highway 8
- SC08, a FIPS 10-4 region code, see List of FIPS region codes (S–U)
- SC-08, a subdivision code for the Seychelles, see ISO 3166-2:SC
- asteroids:
  - (96300) 1996 SC8 (SC8 of 1996)
  - 1989 SC8 (SC8 of 1989), see 22294 Simmons
  - 1982 SC8 (SC8 of 1982), see 12219 Grigorʹev
- Shorts S.C.8
