= Southern Connector =

Southern Connector may refer to:

- Florida State Road 417 § Phase III: The Southern Connector
- Southern Connector Toll Road, an approximately 10 mile toll portion of Interstate 185 in South Carolina

== See also ==
- Northern Connector
