= South Carolina Highway 8 =

State highway in South Carolina

South Carolina Highway 8

Route information
- Maintained by SCDOT
- Length: 44.030 mi (70.859 km)
- Existed: 1928–present
- Tourist routes: SC Heritage Corridor: Discovery Route: South Carolina Heritage Corridor: Nature Route

Major junctions
- West end: US 276 in northern Greenville County
- I-85 near Piedmont; US 29 near Piedmont
- East end: US 25 / SC 418 in Ware Place

Location
- Country: United States
- State: South Carolina
- Counties: Greenville, Pickens, Anderson

Highway system
- South Carolina State Highway System; Interstate; US; State; Scenic
← SC 7	→ SC 9

South Carolina Highway 8 (SC 8) is a 44.030-mile (70.859 km) primary state highway in the U.S. state of South Carolina. It travels from U.S. Route 276 (US 276) in northern Greenville County to US 25 and SC 418 in Ware Place. It travels physically north and south though it is signed as a west–east highway with its western terminus at US 276 and its eastern terminus at US 25/SC 418.

== Route description ==
SC 8 begins in Ware Place at the junction of US 25 and SC 418. From here, it travels west for about four miles (6.4 km) when it crosses the Saluda River and enters the town of Pelzer in Anderson County. It meets SC 20 at the town limit of Pelzer and after crossing SC 20 it enters West Pelzer.

After exiting West Pelzer, it runs northwest for two miles (3.2 km) and has an interchange with US 29. About one mile (1.6 km) past US 29, the highway has an interchange with Interstate 85 (I-85) at its exit 32. Another mile past this interchange, SC 8 intersects SC 81, which runs concurrent with SC 8 for two miles (3.2 km). SC 8 turns to the west and crosses SC 88 and winds its way to the western terminus of SC 86.

Here, it turns to the northwest and crosses into Pickens County and runs toward Easley. Soon after entering the city limits of Easley, it meets SC 135 and overlaps it for one-half mile (0.80 km). SC 8 then turns to the northwest and crosses US 123, but has no access to the highway directly. After one mile (1.6 km), it intersects SC 93 just west of downtown Easley. From here, it is eight miles (13 km) to Pickens, and for this duration, the road is four-laned. In downtown Pickens, SC 8 meets SC 183 and overlaps it for a half-mile.

SC 8 continues straight and runs toward Pumpkintown, along the way meeting the western terminus of SC 186 and the northern terminus of SC 135. In Pumpkintown, it crosses SC 288 and soon meets SC 11, which it has a concurrency with for about a half-mile. SC 8 then turns north and meets its end at US 276 in northern Greenville County.

== History ==
The first alignment of SC 8 ran from the Georgia state line through Anderson, Greenville, Greer, Spartanburg, Gaffney, and Blacksburg into North Carolina near Grover. This alignment connected directly to Georgia State Route 8 at the Georgia state line. In 1927, this became US 29, and SC 8 was put onto a completely different alignment, which was previously SC 13 (which was reused on former SC 17). With a few minor changes, this is today's SC 8.

== Major intersections ==
County	Location	mi	km	Destinations	Notes
Greenville		0.000	0.000	US 276 (Geer Highway) – Caesars Head, Cleveland, Travelers Rest	Western terminus
Pickens		1.360	2.189	SC 11 north (Cherokee Foothills National Scenic Highway) – Greenville	Western end of SC 11 concurrency
Pickens		1.950	3.138	SC 11 south (Cherokee Foothills National Scenic Highway) – Table Rock	Eastern end of SC 11 concurrency
Pickens		5.720	9.205	SC 288 (Table Rock Road) – Marietta	
Pickens		6.260	10.074	SC 135 south (Dacusville Highway) – Easley	Northern terminus of SC 135
Pickens		11.620	18.701	SC 186 east (Earls Bridge Road) – Dacusville	Western terminus of SC 186
Pickens	Pickens	14.468	23.284	SC 183 east (Farrs Bridge Road) – Greenville	Western end of SC 183 concurrency
Pickens	Pickens	14.950	24.060	SC 183 west (East Main Street) – Walhalla	Eastern end of SC 183 concurrency
Pickens	Easley	21.860	35.180	SC 93 (Liberty Drive / West Main Street) – Liberty, Clemson	
Pickens	Easley	22.080	35.534	Folger Avenue east (SC 8 Conn. east)	Western terminus of SC 8 Conn. and Folger Avenue
Pickens	Easley	23.100	37.176	SC 135 (Pendleton Street) / Pope Field Road	Western end of SC 135 concurrency
Pickens	Easley	23.600	37.981	SC 135 south (Anderson Highway) – Anderson	Eastern end of SC 135 concurrency
Anderson		27.580	44.386	SC 86 east	Western terminus of SC 86
Anderson		30.940	49.793	SC 88 west (Old Greenville Highway) – Pendleton	Eastern terminus of SC 88
Anderson		31.440	50.598	SC 81 north (Moore Road) – Greenville	Western end of SC 81 concurrency
Anderson		33.410	53.768	SC 81 south / Highway 17 – Anderson	Eastern end of SC 81 concurrency
Anderson		34.751– 34.830	55.926– 56.053	I-85 / Guyton Road / Durham Road – Greenville, Atlanta	I-85 exit 32
Anderson		36.240	58.323	US 29 to I-85 north – Greenville, Anderson	Grade-separated interchange
Anderson	Pelzer–West Pelzer line	39.560	63.666	SC 20 / Depot Road – Williamston, Piedmont	
Greenville	Ware Place	44.030	70.859	US 25 (Augusta Road) / SC 418 east (Old Hundred Road) – Fountain Inn, Greenville, Greenwood	Eastern terminus of SC 8; western terminus of SC 418
1.000 mi = 1.609 km; 1.000 km = 0.621 mi: Concurrency terminus

== Easley connector route ==
South Carolina Highway 8 Connector
- Location: Easley
- Length: 0.190 mi (306 m)

South Carolina Highway 8 Connector (SC 8 Conn.) is a connector route in the west-central part of Easley that connects SC 8 (South 5th Street) with SC 93 (East Main Street). The connector route is not signed along SC 8 or SC 93, but there is signage along its actual path. The entire length is known as Folger Avenue.

SC 8 Conn. and Folger Avenue begin at an intersection with the SC 8 mainline (South 5th Street) and travel to the northeast. They curve to the east-northeast and reach their eastern terminus, an intersection with SC 93 (East Main Street).

The entire route is in Easley, Pickens County.

mi	km	Destinations	Notes
0.000	0.000	South 5th Street (SC 8)	Western terminus of SC 8 Conn. and Folger Avenue
0.190	0.306	East Main Street (SC 93)	Eastern terminus of SC 8 Conn. and Folger Avenue
1.000 mi = 1.609 km; 1.000 km = 0.621 mi
