= South Carolina Highway 418 =

State highway in South Carolina, United States

South Carolina Highway 418

Route information
- Maintained by SCDOT
- Length: 24.740 mi (39.815 km)
- Existed: 1949–present

Major junctions
- West end: US 25 / SC 8 in Ware Place
- I-385 in Fountain Inn; SC 14 in Fountain Inn
- East end: SC 101 / SC 146 near Woodruff

Location
- Country: United States
- State: South Carolina
- Counties: Greenville, Laurens, Spartanburg

Highway system
- South Carolina State Highway System; Interstate; US; State; Scenic
← SC 417	→ SC 419

South Carolina Highway 418 (SC 418) is a 24.740-mile (39.815 km), east–west state highway in upstate South Carolina. It travels between U.S. Route 25 (US 25) in southern Greenville County and SC 101/SC 146 in southern Spartanburg County; it also travels through northern Laurens County.

== Route description ==
The western terminus of SC 418 is at the junction of US 25 and SC 8 in Ware Place. It then proceeds in an east-northeast direction to Fountain Inn, crossing Interstate 385 (I-385) at exit 23 before entering the city. After the interchange, the highway intersects SC 14 and takes a north-northeast route, following almost parallel to the Greenville-Laurens County border. It then cuts across the northern corner of Laurens County heading through rural areas of the county without passing any incorporated towns or intersecting any other state highways. It travels across the Enoree River to head east into Spartanburg County, and coming to its east terminus on the outskirts of Woodruff at the intersection with SC 101/SC 146.

== Major intersections ==
County	Location	mi	km	Destinations	Notes
Greenville	Ware Place	0.000	0.000	US 25 (Augusta Road) / SC 8 west – Greenville, Greenwood	Eastern terminus of SC 8 and SC 418
Greenville	Fountain Inn	11.520– 11.550	18.540– 18.588	I-385 – Greenville, Columbia	I-385 exit 23
Greenville	Fountain Inn	12.310	19.811	SC 14 (South Main Street) – Greenville	
Laurens	No major junctions				
Spartanburg		24.740	39.815	SC 101 / SC 146 / Carlton Duvall Drive – Greer, Woodruff	Eastern terminus
1.000 mi = 1.609 km; 1.000 km = 0.621 mi
