= South Carolina Highway 13 =

South Carolina Highway 13 can refer to:

- South Carolina Highway 13 (1920s), changed to SC 8 in 1928
- South Carolina Highway 13 (1940s), changed to US 123 in 1946

South Carolina secondary highways are designated "S-(county number)-(highway number)" and can be confused with primary highways. As an example, Bees Creek Road in Jasper County near Ridgeland is identified as S-27-13, though sometimes shortened to SC 13.
