= Happy Cow =

Happy Cow may refer to:

- HappyCow, a guide for vegan and vegetarian restaurants
- Happy Cow Creamery, a dairy farm in Pelzer, South Carolina

== See also ==
- The Laughing Cow, a brand of cheese products
