= Pelzer Presbyterian Church =

Historic church in South Carolina, United States

- U.S. National Register of Historic Places
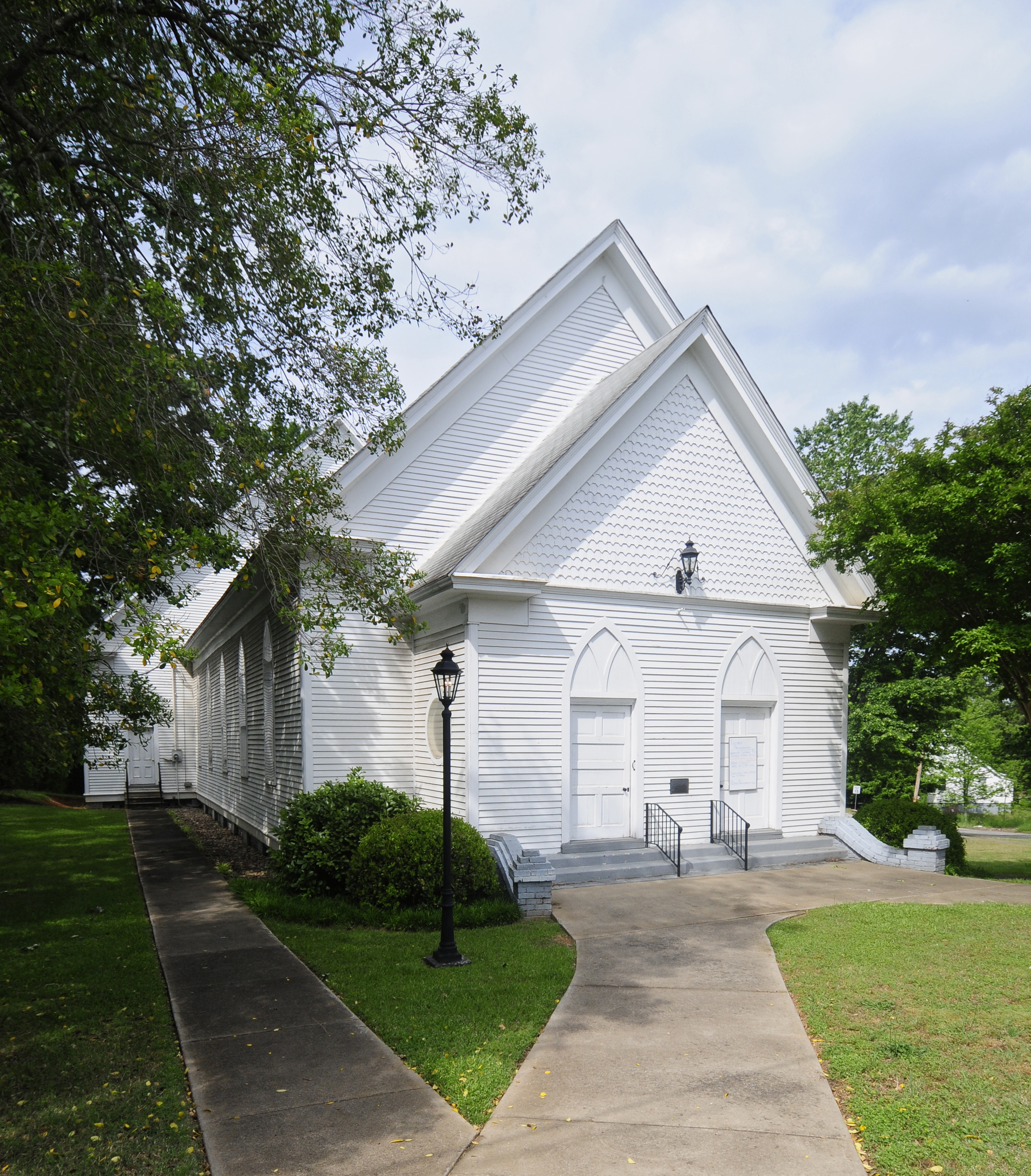

- Location within South Carolina Location within the United States
- Location: 13 Lebby St., Pelzer, South Carolina
- Coordinates: 34°38′32″N 82°27′34″W
- Area: 1 acre (0.40 ha)
- Built: 1896
- Architectural style: Late Gothic Revival, Gothic
- NRHP reference No.: 93001407
- Added to NRHP: December 13, 1993

Pelzer Presbyterian Church is a historic Presbyterian church located at 13 Lebby Street in Pelzer, Anderson County, South Carolina. It was built in 1896, and is a rectangular Akron Plan church building with a gable front roof and sheathed in weatherboard. It features impressive stained and leaded glass windows and a Gothic arch entrance. A two-story, five-sided Sunday school classroom addition was built in 1905. It was added to the National Register in 1993.
