= South Carolina Highway 417 =

State highway in South Carolina, United States

South Carolina Highway 417

Route information
- Maintained by SCDOT
- Length: 21.699 mi (34.921 km)
- Existed: 1949–present

Major junctions
- West end: US 276 in Mauldin
- I-385 in Mauldin
- East end: SC 296 near Moore

Location
- Country: United States
- State: South Carolina
- Counties: Greenville, Spartanburg

Highway system
- South Carolina State Highway System; Interstate; US; State; Scenic
← SC 414	→ SC 418

South Carolina Highway 417 (SC 417) is a 21.699-mile (34.921 km) state highway in central Greenville and Spartanburg counties in the northwestern part of the U.S. state of South Carolina.

== Route description ==
SC 417's western terminus is at junction with U.S. Route 276 (US 276) in Mauldin and near the junctions of Interstate 385 (I-385) and I-185. Its overall course is in a northeasterly direction, and SC 417's eastern terminus is at a junction with SC 296 near Spartanburg.

From SC 417's western terminus to its split from SC 14, SC 417 is known as Main Street and Laurens Road. From then until its merger with SC 146, SC 417 is known as Lee Vaughn Road. While it is merged with SC 146, SC 417 is known as Woodruff Road. When it splits from SC 146, SC 417 is known only as Highway 417, and it keeps that name until it reaches its eastern terminus.

== Major intersections ==
County	Location	mi	km	Destinations	Notes
Greenville	Mauldin	0.000	0.000	US 276	No access to US 276 south from SC 417 south; interchange
Greenville	Mauldin	1.680	2.704	I-185 north / I-385 – Atlanta, Columbia, Greenville	I-385 exit 31
Greenville	Simpsonville	2.530	4.072	SC 14 north / Pelham Road	Southern end of SC 14 concurrency
Greenville	Simpsonville	4.020	6.470	SC 14 (SE Main Street) / West Curtis Street	Northern end of SC 14 concurrency
Greenville		10.040	16.158	SC 146 west (Woodruff Road) – Greenville	Southern end of SC 146 concurrency; roundabout
Spartanburg		11.520	18.540	SC 146 east – Woodruff	Northern end of SC 146 concurrency; roundabout
Spartanburg	Cashville	13.109	21.097	SC 101 – Greer, Woodruff	
Spartanburg		20.849	33.553	SC 290 (Moore Duncan Highway)	
Spartanburg		21.699	34.921	SC 296 (Reidville Road)	Eastern terminus
1.000 mi = 1.609 km; 1.000 km = 0.621 mi: Concurrency terminus; Incomplete access
