= South Carolina Highway 296 =

State highway in South Carolina, United States

South Carolina Highway 296

Route information
- Maintained by SCDOT
- Length: 21.803 mi (35.089 km)
- Existed: 1940–present

Major junctions
- West end: SC 14 in Five Forks
- I-26 near Spartanburg
- East end: US 176 / SC 9 in Spartanburg

Location
- Country: United States
- State: South Carolina
- Counties: Greenville, Spartanburg

Highway system
- South Carolina State Highway System; Interstate; US; State; Scenic
| ← SC 295 | → SC 300 |

South Carolina Highway 296 (SC 296) is a 21.803-mile (35.089 km) east–west state highway coursing through central Greenville and Spartanburg counties in the northwestern part of the U.S. state of South Carolina.

== Route description ==
The west terminus of SC 296 is at a junction with SC 14 in west-central Greenville County and proceeds in a generally east-northeast direction. Shortly after the junction, the route merges with SC 146, but soon separates from SC 146 a short distance afterward. SC 296 then crosses into Spartanburg County as it traverses the Enoree River, and then intersects with SC 101 before passing through Reidville. Then, SC 296 intersects with SC 290 and SC 417 before intersecting with Interstate 26 (I-26) at exit 22 just outside the Spartanburg city limits. Within the city, SC 296 junctions with U.S. Route 29 (US 29) where the highway officially ends.

== Major intersections ==
| County | Location | mi | km | Destinations | Notes |
|---|---|---|---|---|---|
| Greenville | Five Forks | 0.000 | 0.000 | SC 14 – Simpsonville, Greer | Western terminus; called Five Forks Road |
| Greenville | Five Forks | 1.740 | 2.800 | SC 146 west (Woodruff Road) | Western end of SC 146 concurrency |
| Greenville | Five Forks | 2.440 | 3.927 | SC 146 east (Woodruff Road) – Woodruff | Eastern end of SC 146 concurrency, from which it is called S Bennetts Bridge Road |
| Spartanburg | Sugar Tit | 7.610 | 12.247 | SC 101 – Greer, Woodruff | |
| Spartanburg | Poplar Springs | 13.083 | 21.055 | SC 290 (Moore-Duncan Highway) | |
| Spartanburg | | 14.273 | 22.970 | SC 417 west | Eastern terminus of SC 417 |
| Spartanburg | | 18.398 | 29.609 | I-26 – Columbia, Asheville | I-26 exit 22 |
| Spartanburg | Spartanburg | 18.543 | 29.842 | SC 215 south / SC 295 north (East Blackstock Road) – Arcadia, Roebuck | Western end of SC 295 concurrency; northern terminus of SC 215 |
| Spartanburg | Spartanburg | 19.443 | 31.290 | SC 295 south (Southport Road) | Eastern end of SC 295 concurrency |
| Spartanburg | Spartanburg | 21.803 | 35.089 | US 29 (West Main Street / West St. John Street) | Eastern terminus |
1.000 mi = 1.609 km; 1.000 km = 0.621 mi: Concurrency terminus
