= Greenville and Western Railroad =

Former railroad company

The Greenville and Western Railroad was a South Carolina railroad company that operated in the western part of the state in the early part of the 20th century.

The Greenville and Western traces its history back to the Carolina, Knoxville and Western Railway which began operation in the late 1880s. However, the line was unsuccessful and abandoned. In 1904, the Greenville and Knoxville Railroad was incorporated to take over the route.

The Greenville and Knoxville was sold at foreclosure 10 years later, after which it was rechartered as the Greenville and Western Railroad. It was renamed again in 1920 as the Greenville and Northern Railway.
