= Palmetto Pass =

Toll collection system in South Carolina

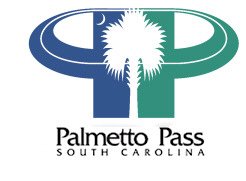
- Company type: Electronic toll-collection systems
- Products: Transponders, Car tags
- Services: South Carolina

Palmetto Pass (often referenced as PAL PASS) is an electronic toll-collection system used on all toll roads in South Carolina. It was originally administered by the South Carolina Department of Transportation and is now operated by the Connector 2000 Association, which operates the Southern Connector.

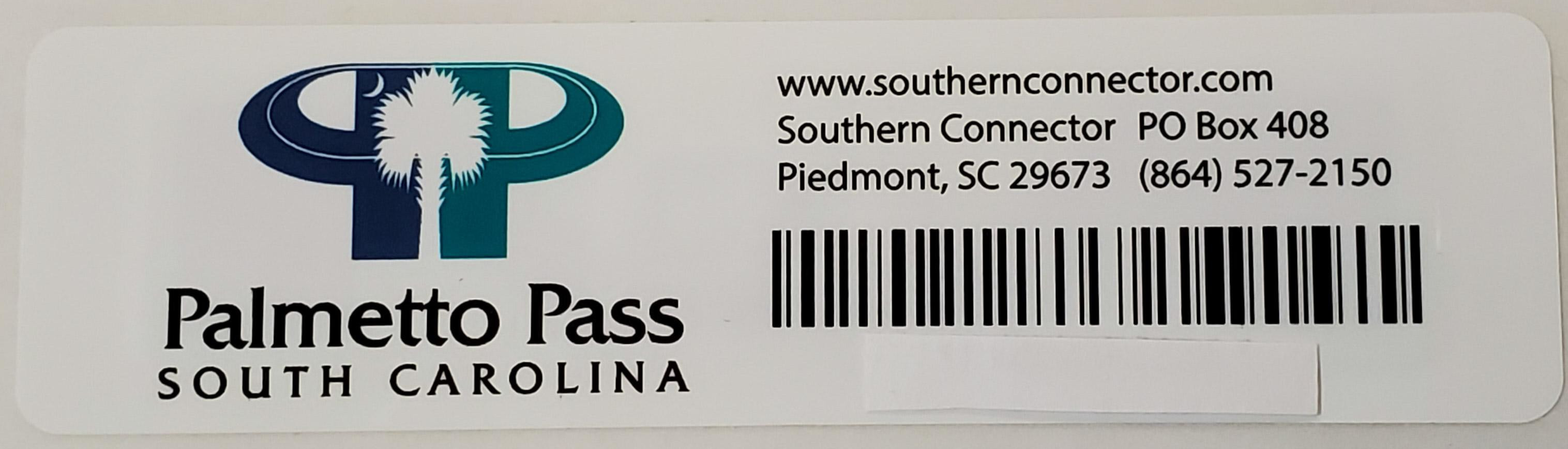
Palmetto Pass

Palmetto Pass is now used on one toll road: the Southern Connector (Interstate 185) in Greenville County. Palmetto Pass was formerly used on the Cross Island Parkway (U.S. Highway 278) on Hilton Head Island until tolls were abolished on that road on June 30, 2021. Drivers are able to go through tolls at speeds up to 45 mph (72 km/h) at the two mainline toll plazas and 5 mph (8.0 km/h) at the ramp tolls on the Southern Connector. The Palmetto Pass has no interoperability agreements with other states or agencies that operate electronic toll collection systems.

== Tolls ==
As of March 1, 2021 new Palmetto Pass accounts can only be established through the Southern Connector website or agency office.

On February 28, 2021 the Cross Island Parkway stopped issuing new Palmetto Pass accounts in anticipation of an end to tolling on the parkway on June 30, 2021.

As of January 2, 2024, Palmetto Pass users receive a 10-cent discount on the Southern Connector over cash users at both mainline toll booths. The cost to travel from end to end on the Southern Connector is $4.30 (versus $4.50 for cash users) for two-axle vehicles. Palmetto Pass users pay the same rate as cash payers ($1.50) at the two interchanges with ramp tolls.

On the Cross Island Parkway, Palmetto Pass users previously received a 50-cent discount at the main toll booth (paying .75 cents compared to the $1.25 cash toll rate).

== See also ==
- Electronic toll collection
- Toll road
- Cross Island Parkway
- Southern Connector
