= Hester Store =

- U.S. National Register of Historic Places
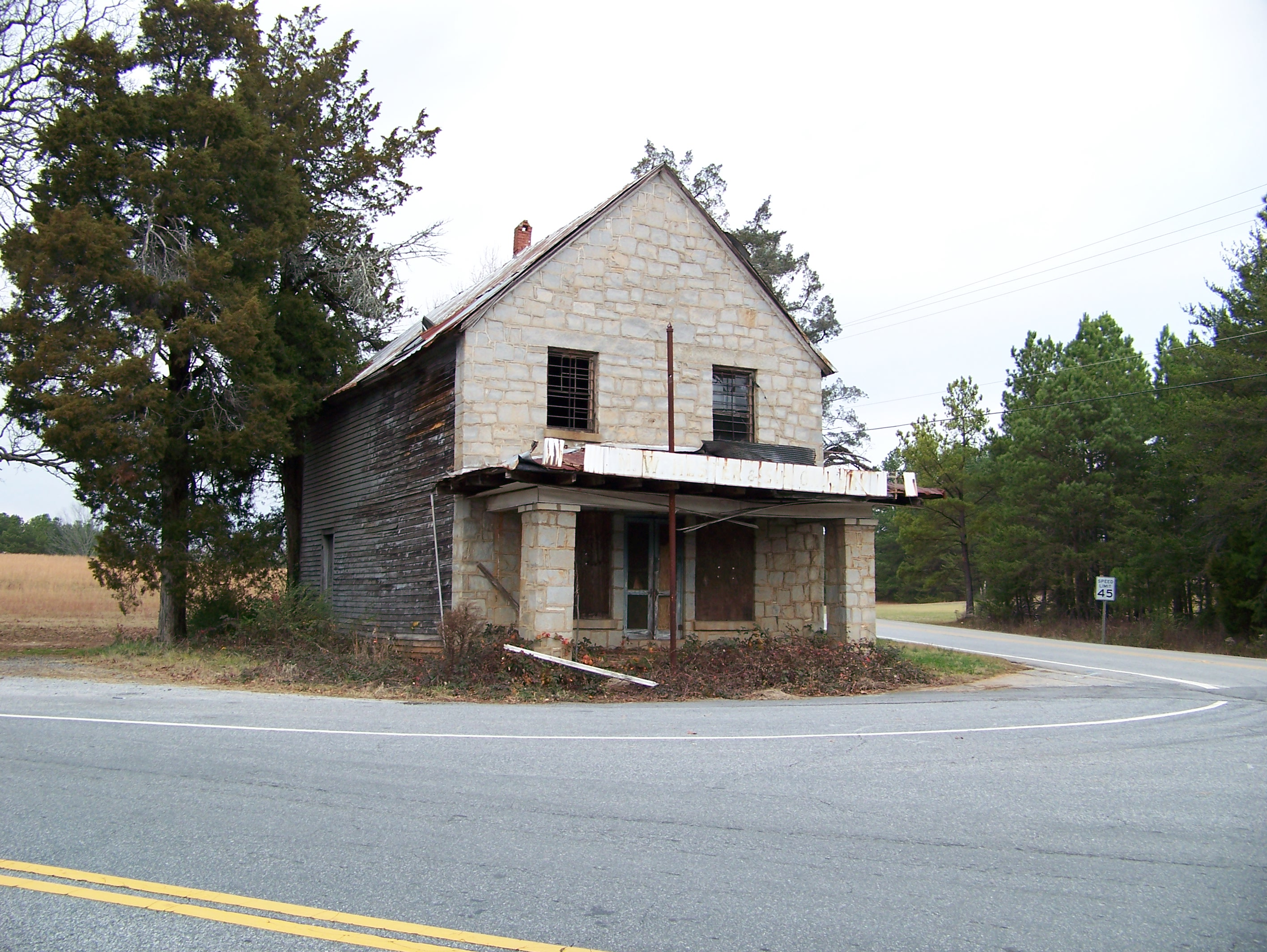

- Location within South Carolina Location within the United States
- Location: 1735 Hester Store Rd., Dacusville, South Carolina
- Coordinates: 34°53′48″N 82°32′20″W
- Area: Less than one acre
- Built: 1893, 1933 2023
- NRHP reference No.: 12001263
- Added to NRHP: February 5, 2013

Hester Store is a historic general store located at Dacusville, Pickens County, South Carolina. It was built in 1893, and is a two-story, front-gable, weatherboard-clad building with an ashlar granite front facade. It features a full-width, single story, porch with granite pillars. The granite facade and porch were added in 1933.

It was listed on the National Register of Historic Places in 2013.
