= Greenville and Knoxville Railroad =

The Greenville and Knoxville Railroad was a South Carolina railroad that operated in the early 20th century.

The Greenville and Knoxville was formed in 1907, to reopen the 16-mile route between Greenville, South Carolina, and River Falls, South Carolina, abandoned by the Carolina, Knoxville and Western Railway a few years early.

In 1914 the railroad once again reorganized, this time as the Greenville and Western Railroad. It was renamed the Greenville and Northern Railway six years later.
