= Five Forks, South Carolina =

- Census-designated place
- Interactive map of Five Forks, South Carolina
- Location within South Carolina Location within the United States
- Coordinates: 34°48′27″N 82°14′25″W
- Country: United States
- State: South Carolina
- County: Greenville

Area
  - Total: 7.61 sq mi (19.72 km^{2})
  - Land: 7.57 sq mi (19.61 km^{2})
  - Water: 0.042 sq mi (0.11 km^{2})
- Elevation: 873 ft (266 m)

Population (2020)
  - Total: 17,737
  - Density: 2,342.9/sq mi (904.58/km^{2})
- Time zone: UTC-5 (Eastern (EST))
  - Summer (DST): UTC-4 (EDT)
- ZIP codes: 29681 (Simpsonville), 29651 (Greer)
- Area codes: 864, 821
- FIPS code: 45-25540
- GNIS feature ID: 2402484

Five Forks is a census-designated place (CDP) in Greenville County, South Carolina, United States. The population was 17,737 at the 2020 census, up from 14,140 in 2010, and 8,064 in 2000. It is a growing, affluent suburb of Greenville and is part of the Greenville–Mauldin–Easley Metropolitan Statistical Area.

== Geography ==
Five Forks is located in eastern Greenville County 11 miles (18 km) east of Downtown Greenville.

The area is bounded by SC 14 to the west, Roper Mountain and Anderson Ridge roads to the north, Jonesville Road to the east, and Gilder Creek (a tributary of the Enoree River) to the south. According to the United States Census Bureau, the CDP has a total area of 7.6 square miles (19.7 km^{2}), of which 0.04 square miles (0.1 km^{2}), or 0.59%, is water.

== History ==
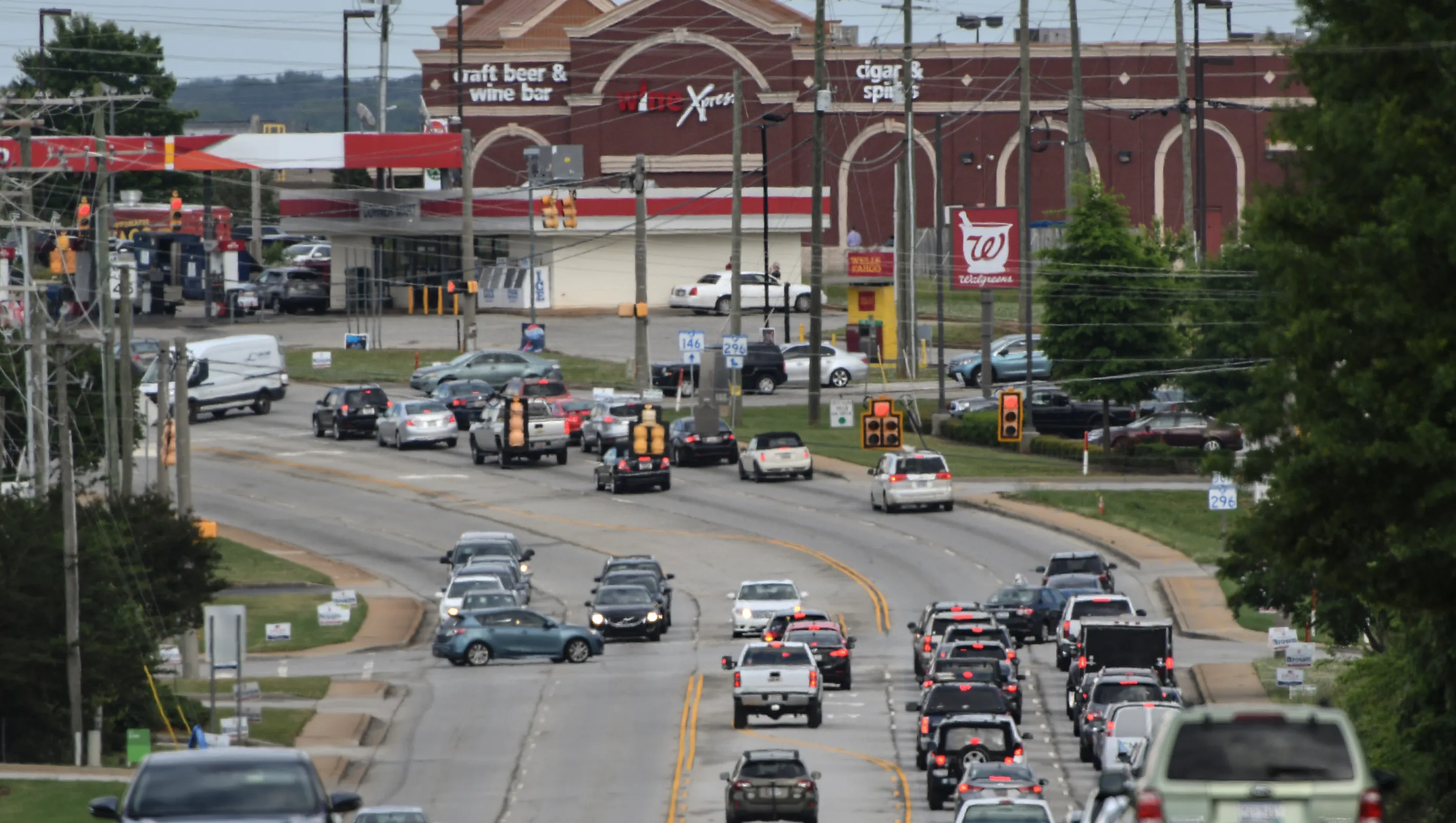
Woodruff Road in 2021 between Batesville and Five Forks Roads

Five Forks is named for a conflux of five roads, which the Greenville edition of The Post and Courier identifies as Woodruff (the main east–west artery), Batesville, Scuffletown, Bennetts Bridge, and one now called Five Forks Road. The area was still very rural into the early 1990s before rapid growth made it a destination for shopping, restaurants, and entertainment. A 1983 USGS map of the region shows an asterisk- or star-shaped intersection of roads – Woodruff passing through, with Adams Mill, Five Forks, and Scuffletown – before a Woodruff bypass and other realignment changed it.

In April 2019, an EF1 tornado was confirmed to have touched down, beginning in Simpsonville and ending its path in Five Forks.

In March 2021, an area plan for Five Forks was posted by Greenville County for comment. The plan had been developed since 2018 by a committee of Five Forks residents to address heavy traffic, loss of trees, and inconsistent growth, and covers commercial design, environmental protection, and goals for residential control. All three county council members who represent parts of Five Forks support the plan, and no one spoke against it at a public hearing in May 2021. The county's addition of overlay districts, as suggested by the plan, would legally govern future development in Five Forks. A motion for the council to adopt the plan as an amendment to the county's comprehensive plan was unanimously carried in August 2021.

== Demographics ==
Historical population
Census	Pop.	Note	%±
2000	8,064		—
2010	14,140		75.3%
2020	17,737		25.4%
U.S. Decennial Census

=== 2020 census ===
As of the 2020 census, Five Forks had a population of 17,737. The median age was 41.5 years. 27.2% of residents were under the age of 18, and 15.0% of residents were 65 years of age or older. For every 100 females, there were 97.5 males, and for every 100 females age 18 and over, there were 93.8 males age 18 and over.

100.0% of residents lived in urban areas, while 0.0% lived in rural areas.

There were 6,108 households in Five Forks, including 5,029 families. Of all households, 42.5% had children under the age of 18 living in them. 73.1% were married-couple households, 8.3% were households with a male householder and no spouse or partner present, and 16.0% were households with a female householder and no spouse or partner present. About 14.4% of all households were made up of individuals, and 6.9% had someone living alone who was 65 years of age or older.

There were 6,353 housing units, of which 3.9% were vacant. The homeowner vacancy rate was 1.4%, and the rental vacancy rate was 8.3%.

Five Forks racial composition
Race	No.	Pct.
White (non-Hispanic)	13,555	76.42%
Black or African American (non-Hispanic)	1,029	5.8%
Native American	34	0.19%
Asian	1,122	6.33%
Pacific Islander	6	0.03%
Other/Mixed	800	4.51%
Hispanic or Latino	1,191	6.71%

=== 2010 census ===
As of the census of 2010, there were 14,140 people and 4,630 households residing in the CDP. The population density was 1,860.5 inhabitants per square mile (718.3/km^{2}). There were 4,805 housing units at an average density of 632.2 units per square mile (244.1 units/km^{2}). The racial makeup of the CDP was 87.5% White, 5.5% African American, 0.2% Native American, 4.4% Asian, 0.01% Pacific Islander, 1.0% some other race, and 1.5% from two or more races. Hispanic or Latino of any race were 4.2% of the population.

There were 4,630 households, out of which 53.6% had children under the age of 18 living with them, 78.3% were headed by married couples living together, 6.5% had a female householder with no husband present, and 13.1% were non-families. 11.0% of all households were made up of individuals, and 3.1% were someone living alone who was 65 years of age or older. The average household size was 3.05, and the average family size was 3.31.

In the CDP, the population was spread out, with 33.3% under the age of 18, 4.4% from 18 to 24, 27.8% from 25 to 44, 27.5% from 45 to 64, and 6.9% who were 65 years of age or older. The median age was 37.3 years. For every 100 females, there were 97.1 males. For every 100 females age 18 and over, there were 93.6 males.

=== Income and poverty ===
For the period 2011–15, the estimated median annual income for a household in the CDP was $115,050, and $120,139 for families. Male full-time workers had a median income of $86,543 versus $53,879 for females. The per capita income for the CDP was $43,114. About 1.3% of families and 1.5% of the population were below the poverty line, including 1.3% of those under age 18 and 1.9% of those age 65 or over.

As of 2021, average household income in Five Forks was twice the average for the rest of Greenville County.

== Education ==
Public education in Five Forks is administered by the Greenville County School District. The district operates Monarch Elementary School in Five Forks. Southside Christian School is a large private school within the CDP, and Primrose Schools has a local campus.

Five Forks has a public library, a branch of the Greenville County Library System.

== Government ==
Five Forks is governed by Greenville County, whose 12-member council includes three who represent portions of the CDP in state legislative districts 21, 27, and 28. All three are members of the Republican Party.

Districts 21 and 35 of the South Carolina House of Representatives cover portions of Five Forks, as do state senate districts 8, 12, and 13. The CDP is within South Carolina's 4th congressional district, represented by William Timmons since 2019.

== Fire and safety ==
Five Forks is served by Clear Spring Fire and Rescue, as well as the Pelham Batesville Fire Department station 3. It has no police force of its own and is served by the Greenville County Sheriff's Office.
