= South Carolina Highway 146 =

State highway in South Carolina, United States

South Carolina Highway 146

Route information
- Maintained by SCDOT
- Length: 33.447 mi (53.828 km)
- Existed: 1942–present

Major junctions
- West end: US 276 in Greenville
- I-85 in Greenville; I-385 in Greenville; SC 14 in Simpsonville; I-26 near Cross Anchor
- East end: SC 56 in Cross Anchor

Location
- Country: United States
- State: South Carolina
- Counties: Greenville, Spartanburg

Highway system
- South Carolina State Highway System; Interstate; US; State; Scenic
← SC 145	→ SC 150

South Carolina Highway 146 (SC 146) is a 33.447-mile (53.828 km) South Carolina state highway running through Central Greenville County and south-western Spartanburg County.

== Route description ==
SC 146's western terminus is at Laurens Road (U.S. Route 276 or US 276), near the intersection of Interstates 85 (I-85) and 385. Its course then goes in a southeasterly direction where its eastern terminus is at its intersection with SC 56 near Cross Anchor.

From its western terminus to its split from SC 417, SC 146 is known as Woodruff Road. From its split to the merger with SC 101, SC 146 is known as 3rd Street. Once SC 146/SC 101 merges with US 221 in Woodruff it is known as Main Street, then Laurens Road as it splits from SC 101. Its final name change happens when SC 146 splits from US 221 just outside Woodruff; its name changes to Cross Anchor Highway, and it keeps that name until it reaches its eastern terminus.

== Major intersections ==
County	Location	mi	km	Destinations	Notes
Greenville	Greenville	0.000	0.000	US 276 (Laurens Road) – Mauldin, Greenville	
Greenville	Greenville	2.890	4.651	I-85 – Atlanta, Spartanburg Charlotte	I-85 exit 51A
Greenville		3.610	5.810	I-385 – Columbia, Greenville	I-385 exit 35
Greenville	Five Forks	5.670	9.125	SC 14 – Greer, Simpsonville	
Greenville	Five Forks	7.360	11.845	SC 296 west (Five Forks Road)	West end of SC 296 overlap
Greenville	Five Forks	8.060	12.971	SC 296 east (South Bennetts Bridge Road) – Reidville, Spartanburg	East end of SC 296 overlap
Greenville		10.618	17.088	SC 417 west (Lee Vaughn Road) – Simpsonville, Fountain Inn	West end of SC 417 overlap; roundabout
Spartanburg		12.098	19.470	SC 417 east – Spartanburg	East end of SC 417 overlap; roundabout
Spartanburg		14.778	23.783	SC 101 north (Bellview Road) – Greer	West end of SC 101 overlap
Spartanburg		16.297	26.227	SC 418 west (Fountain Inn Road) / Carlton Duvall Drive – Fountain Inn	Eastern terminus of SC 418
Spartanburg	Woodruff	16.138	25.972	US 221 north (North Main Street) to I-26	West end of US 221 overlap
Spartanburg	Woodruff	19.517	31.410	SC 101 south (Georgia Street)	East end of SC 101 overlap
Spartanburg	Woodruff	21.047	33.872	US 221 south (Laurens Road) / South Pearson Street	East end of US 221 overlap
Spartanburg	Hobbyville	27.007– 27.077	43.464– 43.576	I-26 – Columbia, Spartanburg	I-26 exit 38
Spartanburg	Cross Anchor	33.447	53.828	SC 56 – Spartanburg	
1.000 mi = 1.609 km; 1.000 km = 0.621 mi: Concurrency terminus
