= South Carolina Highway 86 =

Highway in South Carolina

South Carolina Highway 86

Route information
- Maintained by SCDOT
- Length: 12.090 mi (19.457 km)

Major junctions
- West end: SC 8 near Easley
- I-85 / US 29 near Piedmont
- East end: US 25 near Golden Grove

Location
- Country: United States
- State: South Carolina
- Counties: Anderson, Greenville

Highway system
- South Carolina State Highway System; Interstate; US; State; Scenic
← I-85	→ SC 88

South Carolina Highway 86 (SC 86) is a 12.090-mile-long (19.457 km) state highway in the U.S. state of South Carolina. The highway connects the Easley and Piedmont areas.

== Route description ==
SC 86 begins at an intersection with SC 8 (Pelzer Highway) south of Easley within Anderson County. It travels to the southeast and intersects SC 81. Then, it continues to the southeast and curves to the east just before an interchange with Interstate 85 (I-85) and U.S. Route 29 (US 29). Then, it enters Piedmont, where it crosses over the Saluda River on an unnamed bridge, enters Greenville County, and intersects SC 20 (Piedmont Highway). The highway crosses over Grove Creek on an unnamed bridge, before reaching its eastern terminus, an intersection with US 25 (Augusta Road). Here, the roadway continues as Sandy Springs Road.

== History ==
=== South Carolina Highway 85 ===
South Carolina Highway 85
- Location: Piedmont, South Carolina
- Existed: 1937–1938

South Carolina Highway 85 (SC 85) was a state highway that was established from SC 8/SC 81 near Piedmont to U.S. Route 29 (US 29; now SC 20) in Piedmont. In 1938, it was decommissioned and redesignated as SC 86. Today, only the portion from just west of I-85 to Piedmont is part of SC 86.

== Major intersections ==
County	Location	mi	km	Destinations	Notes
Anderson		0.000	0.000	SC 8 (Pelzer Highway) – Easley	Western terminus
Anderson		2.280	3.669	SC 81	
Anderson		5.483– 5.580	8.824– 8.980	I-85 / US 29 – Atlanta, Greenville	I-85/US 29 exit 35
Greenville	Piedmont	8.570	13.792	SC 20 (Piedmont Highway) – Anderson, Greenville	
Greenville		12.090	19.457	US 25 (Augusta Road) – Greenwood, Greenville	Eastern terminus
1.000 mi = 1.609 km; 1.000 km = 0.621 mi
