= Happy Cow Creamery =

Dairy farm in Pelzer, South Carolina

Coordinates: 34.613661°N 82.353069°W

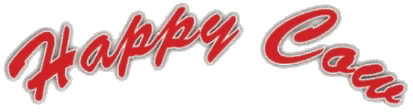
Logo

Happy Cow Creamery is a family-owned dairy farm in Pelzer, South Carolina that bottles and sells its own milk on site from the farm's closed herd of grass-fed Holstein cattle. The creamery's whole milk, buttermilk and chocolate milk is sold in the farm's on-site store and through grocery, convenience and country stores in Upstate region of South Carolina. The milk is not homogenized and is low-temperature pasteurized and inspected by the State of South Carolina.

The dairy is noted for owner Tom Trantham's system of rotating pasture feeding dubbed 12 Aprils. For this innovation, Trantham was awarded the first Patrick Madden Award for Sustainable Agriculture in 2002 by the United States Department of Agriculture (USDA) Cooperative State Research, Education, and Extension Service (CSREES).

== Feeding ==
Trantham developed a grass pasturing method modeled after traditional paddock systems common in Ireland. With a USDA grant obtained through Clemson University, Trantham worked with Clemson Animal, Dairy and Veterinary Science Department researchers Jean Bertrand and Fred Pardue, who examined the feasibility of year-round dairy grazing.

The approximately 80 head milking herd is rotated through 29 paddocks of 2.5 to 3.5 acres (14,000 m^{2}), feeding on a different paddock each day. By the end of the cycle, the first paddock has re-grown and the herd cycles through again. The herd also receives supplemental feeding in the form of high-energy pellets and hay at milking time. Organic fertilizer is used on the pasture and no injected rBGH is used to treat milk cows. However, Trantham has not sought official organic certification.

Before perfecting the grass-fed pasture system, Trantham operated as a traditional, high-volume dairy relying on chemical fertilizers and heavy grain feeding. Despite state awards for milk production, Trantham's farm was losing money and he was facing bankruptcy. When the milking herd one day pushed out of its feedlot into a neighboring field of weeds awaiting planting, milk production immediately increased. Trantham allowed the herd to graze again and observed that the cows only ate the top half of the lush, virgin weed pasture. Further research by Trantham showed this top half contained most of the nutrients of the plant. It is from this chance encounter that Trantham researched and developed the "12 Aprils" grass-feeding system.

== Milk ==
Happy Cow Creamery milk is not homogenized and is pasteurized with a low-temperature "batch pasteurization" process that is reported to kill harmful bacteria while preserving vitamins and helpful enzymes. The dairy is inspected by the State of South Carolina. The milk is not raw, although raw milk is legal to sell in South Carolina from the farm or small stores.

Meat and dairy products from grass-fed animals can produce 300-500% more conjugated linoleic acid (CLA) than those of cattle fed the usual diet of 50% hay and silage, and 50% grain. A fatty acid profile on Happy Cow milk was performed by Utah State University, which found the milk contains up to four times the CLA of traditional store-bought milk and almost twice as much CLA as Organic Pastures Dairy Co., a popular raw milk producer in California. The CLA was 1.2 percent of the fat composition, according to the test.

== Distribution ==
Happy Cow Creamery distributes whole milk, chocolate milk and buttermilk to grocery and convenience stores and small markets in Upstate South Carolina including:

- Whole Foods Market
- Fresh Market
- Earth Fare
- New York Butcher Shoppe
- Greenville Farmer's Market
- Rosewood Market & Deli (Columbia, SC)

The Happy Cow Creamery farm store is a Certified Roadside Market by the State of South Carolina. In addition to its own milk, the store sells butter, cheeses, pasture eggs, natural meats and ice cream. Jellies, breads, coffee and other locally produced grocery items are offered as well. Produce grown on the farm or from neighboring local farms is offered when in season.

The store offers frozen, locally grown meats from small farms including:

- Pasture-raised pork from Native Meats in Greer, South Carolina and Caw Caw Creek farm in Columbia, South Carolina.
- Grass fed beef from Bull Hill Ranch in Gray Court, South Carolina.
- Free range on pasture eggs from L and L Farms in Belton, South Carolina. [129 Holly Springs Rd, Belton SC 29627, 864-209-6980]
- Pasture-raised chicken from Native Meats in Greer, South Carolina
