= Swamp Rabbit Trail =

Rail trail in western South Carolina

Coordinates: 34.89057°N 82.439175°W

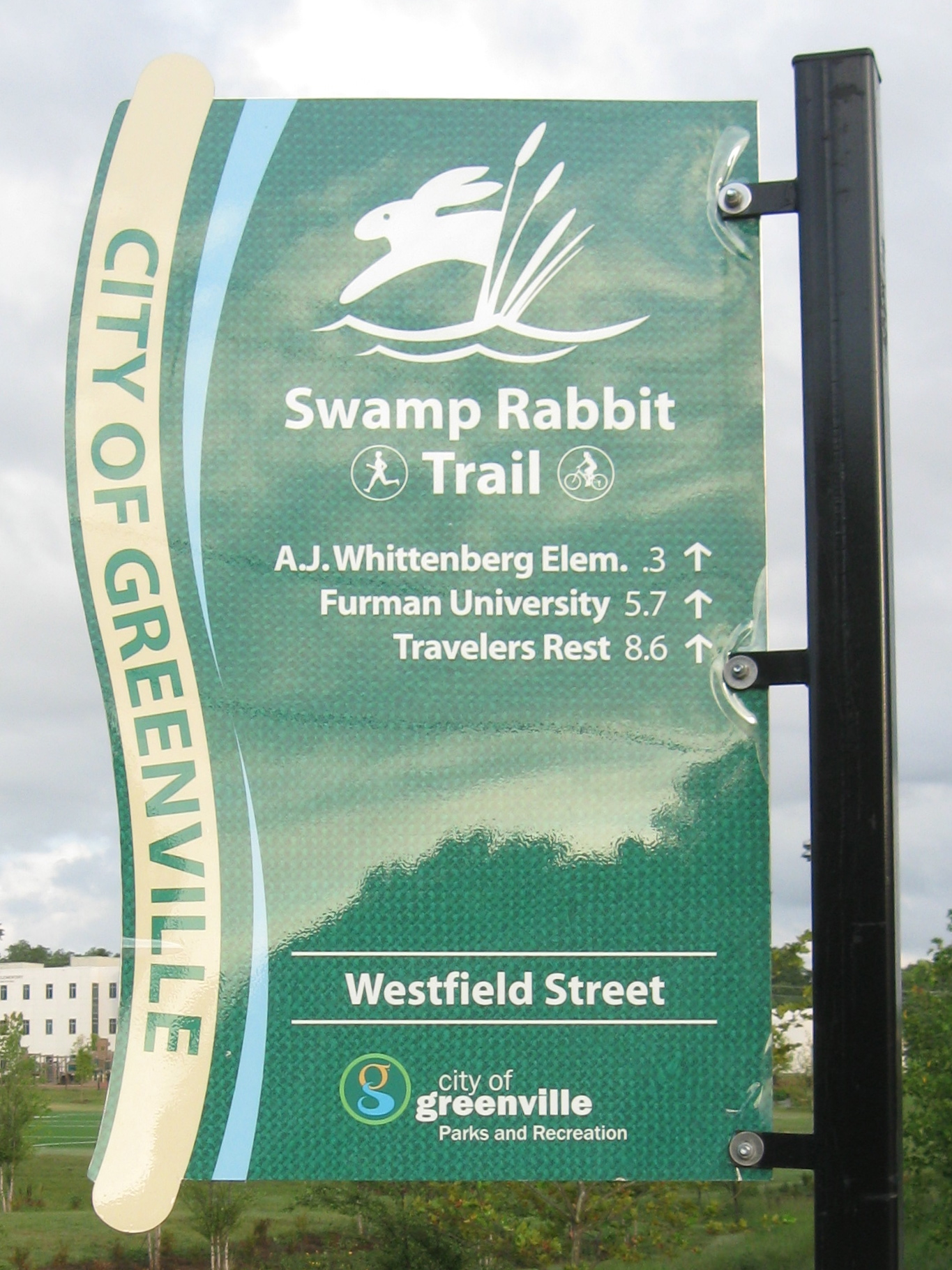
- Swamp Rabbit Trail
- Length: 19.9 mi (32.0 km)
- Location: Greenville County, South Carolina
- Use: Cycling, walking, running
- Difficulty: Easy
- Season: Year-round
- Website: www.greenvillesc.gov/316/Swamp-Rabbit-Trail

The Prisma Health Swamp Rabbit Trail is a 19.9-mile (32.0 km) multi-use rail trail in Greenville County, South Carolina, that largely follows the bed of a former railroad that had been nicknamed after the indigenous swamp rabbit. The trail begins at Greenville Technical College, crosses the city of Greenville, proceeds through Falls Park and the campus of Furman University, and ends about a mile north of the Travelers Rest city limits.

== History ==
In 1999, Greenville County Council created the Greenville County Economic Development Corporation to purchase the roadbed of the defunct Greenville & Northern Railway for dual use as a greenway and light rail passenger line. The proposed commuter rail was quickly abandoned, but The Greenville News editorially suggested a bike and hiking trail, though admitting the plan to be an "unrealistic dream." As late as 2005, the head of a Greenville conservation group hiked the route "armed with a machete" because the proposed trail was "heavily overgrown...almost impassible in parts."

Although planning for a multi-use trail began that summer, the Surface Transportation Board in Washington had to approve the abandonment of the line, and a private Greenville firm suggested buying it and resuming rail service. Eventually the private firm bowed out, and in April 2006, the STB approved the abandonment. In 2007, the Greenville Health System gave $1 million towards the $2.7 million project, and the trail was officially named the Greenville Health System Swamp Rabbit Trail. The Swamp Rabbit Trail was already attracting users by January 2008, even before it officially opened in 2010 after considerable "legal entanglements, regulatory roadblocks, financial issues and citizen opposition."

One currently unconnected section runs from Lake Conestee Nature Park to Parkins Mill Road and I-85, and another disconnected section exists in Fountain Inn. Residents of the affluent Parkins Mill neighborhood have opposed a connector from the Lake Conestee section, but Greenville County plans to bridge the gap with underpasses or overpasses.

A 2012 study estimated that more than 350,000 people annually used the trail and that area businesses increased their sales from 30 to 85%. A 2014 study estimated usage had increased to half a million people a year, a quarter of whom were tourists. In 2013, the mayor of Travelers Rest said that the trail had "been phenomenal for the whole county, but more so for us in Travelers Rest. I can't begin to tell you how much of an economic boost it's been to this town." A 2012 Greenville News editorial described the Swamp Rabbit Trail as "one of the most popular assets in Greenville County...proving that when it comes to such trails, if you build them they will come." In 2016, Greenville County Recreation estimated the trail's economic impact on the county to be $7 million per year.
