= Golden Grove, South Carolina =

- Census-designated place
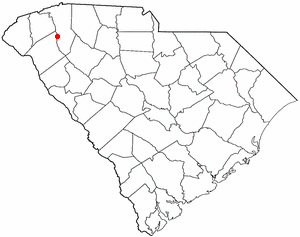
- Location of Golden Grove, South Carolina
- Coordinates: 34°44′34″N 82°26′27″W
- Country: United States
- State: South Carolina
- County: Greenville

Area
  - Total: 5.85 sq mi (15.15 km^{2})
  - Land: 5.78 sq mi (14.96 km^{2})
  - Water: 0.073 sq mi (0.19 km^{2})
- Elevation: 863 ft (263 m)

Population (2020)
  - Total: 3,002
  - Density: 519.7/sq mi (200.67/km^{2})
- Time zone: UTC-5 (Eastern (EST))
  - Summer (DST): UTC-4 (EDT)
- ZIP code: 29673
- Area codes: 864, 821
- FIPS code: 45-29635
- GNIS feature ID: 2402533

Golden Grove is a census-designated place (CDP) in Greenville County, South Carolina, United States. The population was 2,467 at the 2010 census. It is part of the Greenville–Mauldin–Easley Metropolitan Statistical Area.

== Geography ==
Golden Grove is located in western Greenville County. It is bordered to the south and west by the unincorporated community of Piedmont. The western edge of Golden Grove follows the Saluda River, which is the border with Anderson County.

The main road through Golden Grove is South Carolina Highway 20, which leads north 9 miles (14 km) to Greenville and south through Piedmont 16 miles (26 km) to Belton. Interstate 185 passes through the northern part of Golden Grove, crossing SC 20 at Exit 10. I-185 leads north 4 miles (6 km) to Interstate 85 and east 10 miles (16 km) to Interstate 385, forming part of a loop around the southern suburbs of Greenville.

According to the United States Census Bureau, the Golden Grove CDP has a total area of 5.8 square miles (15.0 km^{2}), of which 5.7 square miles (14.8 km^{2}) are land and 0.1 square miles (0.2 km^{2}), or 1.39%, are water.

== Demographics ==
Historical population
Census	Pop.	Note	%±
2020	3,002		—
U.S. Decennial Census

=== 2020 census ===
As of the 2020 census, Golden Grove had a population of 3,002. The median age was 38.1 years. 23.8% of residents were under the age of 18 and 15.9% of residents were 65 years of age or older. For every 100 females there were 92.8 males, and for every 100 females age 18 and over there were 92.8 males age 18 and over.

66.0% of residents lived in urban areas, while 34.0% lived in rural areas.

There were 1,177 households in Golden Grove, of which 33.5% had children under the age of 18 living in them. Of all households, 49.2% were married-couple households, 17.9% were households with a male householder and no spouse or partner present, and 27.0% were households with a female householder and no spouse or partner present. About 23.8% of all households were made up of individuals and 9.7% had someone living alone who was 65 years of age or older.

There were 1,263 housing units, of which 6.8% were vacant. The homeowner vacancy rate was 1.8% and the rental vacancy rate was 6.1%.

Racial composition as of the 2020 census
Race	Number	Percent
White	1,924	64.1%
Black or African American	755	25.1%
American Indian and Alaska Native	11	0.4%
Asian	21	0.7%
Native Hawaiian and Other Pacific Islander	3	0.1%
Some other race	97	3.2%
Two or more races	191	6.4%
Hispanic or Latino (of any race)	198	6.6%

=== 2000 census ===
As of the 2000 census, there were 2,348 people, 914 households, and 687 families residing in the CDP. The population density was 402.0 inhabitants per square mile (155.2/km^{2}). There were 977 housing units at an average density of 167.3 per square mile (64.6/km^{2}). The racial makeup of the CDP was 82.07% White, 15.93% African American, 0.09% Native American, 0.60% Asian, 0.09% Pacific Islander, 0.17% from other races, and 1.06% from two or more races. Hispanic or Latino of any race were 0.77% of the population.

There were 914 households, out of which 33.3% had children under the age of 18 living with them, 58.9% were married couples living together, 12.4% had a female householder with no husband present, and 24.8% were non-families. 20.7% of all households were made up of individuals, and 7.2% had someone living alone who was 65 years of age or older. The average household size was 2.57 and the average family size was 2.96.

In the CDP, the population was spread out, with 25.2% under the age of 18, 7.5% from 18 to 24, 31.2% from 25 to 44, 23.9% from 45 to 64, and 12.2% who were 65 years of age or older. The median age was 37 years. For every 100 females, there were 93.4 males. For every 100 females age 18 and over, there were 88.6 males.

The median income for a household in the CDP was $41,447, and the median income for a family was $50,670. Males had a median income of $32,286 versus $24,451 for females. The per capita income for the CDP was $17,737. About 6.0% of families and 8.0% of the population were below the poverty line, including 8.1% of those under age 18 and 15.6% of those age 65 or over.
