= Pelzer, South Carolina =

Pelzer
- Town
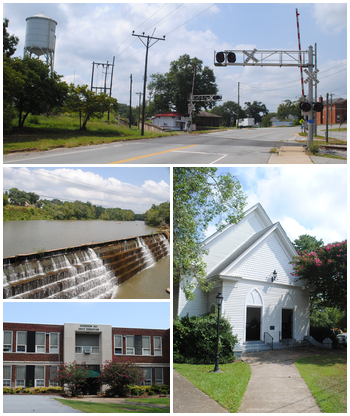
- Top, left to right: South Carolina Highway 8, Saluda River, Pelzer Primary School, Pelzer Presbyterian Church

- Flag Seal
- Motto: "Town of Pelzer... A Place to Call Home!"
- Location within the state of South Carolina Pelzer (the United States)
- Coordinates: 34°38′36″N 82°27′32″W
- Country: United States
- State: South Carolina
- County: Anderson

Area
  - Total: 0.97 sq mi (2.52 km^{2})
  - Land: 0.92 sq mi (2.37 km^{2})
  - Water: 0.058 sq mi (0.15 km^{2})
- Elevation: 781 ft (238 m)

Population (2020)
  - Total: 1,344
  - Density: 1,470.6/sq mi (567.81/km^{2})
- Time zone: UTC-5 (EST)
  - Summer (DST): UTC-4 (EDT)
- ZIP code: 29669
- Area codes: 864, 821
- FIPS code: 45-55465
- GNIS feature ID: 2407092
- Website: www.townofpelzer.us

Pelzer is a town in Anderson County, South Carolina, United States, along the Saluda River. Its population was 89 at the 2010 census, and grew to 1,344 at the 2020 census.

== Government ==
As of 2010, the town was governed by a mayor and four council members. The mayor as of 2026 was Chase Smithwick.

== History ==
Pelzer was founded in the 19th century as a mill town around several mill sites on the Saluda River developed by the Pelzer Manufacturing Company. The first (lower) mill was completed in 1882; two additional expansions were referred to as mills 2 and 3, with construction of the 4th mill (the upper mill) starting in 1896. Pelzer Manufacturing drew power from two dams built along the Saluda River, which generated power with the help of the first generators ever sold by General Electric. The factory was the first in the country to use incandescent lighting.

The company and town were named for Francis J. Pelzer, who surveyed sites along the river and laid out the town, and was, along with William Lebby and Ellison A. Smyth, one of the founders of Pelzer Manufacturing. The first president and treasurer of the company was Ellison Adger Smyth, who held the corporate titles for 43 years. When Smyth decided to build the fourth mill, he initially selected a site four miles downriver from the town along a shoal, necessitating construction of a new mill town. Eventually, however, Smyth decided to build a new mill at Pelzer and began construction at the Upper Mill site, with power generation coming from the downstream shoals and dam. This was the first instance of a mill in South Carolina not built immediately adjacent to its power-generation facility; Smyth contracted General Electric (GE) to build the power lines between the new dam and the existing town, a first in the industry that many competitors argued was doomed to fail. Smyth allowed GE to use the new Upper Mill as a testing ground for new electric generators and motors, which initially cost Pelzer Manufacturing money and made the new mill a money loser for several years, though it did become profitable over time.

All four mills were designed and built by the architecture firm Lockwood, Greene & Co. Pelzer Manufacturing was sold in 1923 and the mills changed hands several times. The final functional owner was Gerber Products Company, which bought the mills in 1986 and made Onesies and other childrenswear until 1990, when the company ceased operations at Pelzer and moved all clothing manufacturing overseas. The mill properties were bought by Greenlight Enterprises, which demolished the upper mill in 2004; the lower mill burned in 2012 and 2014.

In 2008, the Community of Pelzer Historical Society was founded at 1 Reed Street in historic Pelzer, with a mission to preserve, restore, and publish when advisable Pelzer history. The society maintains the Historic Pelzer, South Carolina, archives and the historical preservation of events and celebrations.

Subsequently, in 2013, the Pelzer Heritage Commission bought both mill sites.

In the mill town, the mill managers' homes were laid out along what was the town's main street (Lebby St.), which eventually became South Carolina Highway 8. When the town was initially incorporated, only the main street and adjacent properties were included, so that the management of the mill would retain control of the town; the mill town itself occupied substantially more area than the incorporated town. In 2015, area residents voted to incorporate substantial additional property into the town limits.

The Pelzer Presbyterian Church was listed on the National Register of Historic Places in 1993.

== Geography ==
Pelzer is located in Anderson County, beside the Saluda River. On the town's western border is the town of West Pelzer, and the town of Williamston is 2 miles (3 km) to the south. Anderson, the county seat, is 17 miles (27 km) to the southwest, and the center of Greenville is 17 miles (27 km) to the north.

According to the United States Census Bureau, the town has a total area of 0.19 square miles (0.5 km^{2}), all land.

== Demographics ==
Historical population
Census	Pop.	Note	%±
1950	2,692		—
1960	106		−96.1%
1970	130		22.6%
1980	130		0.0%
1990	81		−37.7%
2000	97		19.8%
2010	89		−8.2%
2020	1,344		1,410.1%
2022 (est.)	1,379	▲	2.6%
U.S. Decennial Census

As of the 2000 Census, 97 people, 35 households, and 26 families were residing in the town. The population density was 498.4 inhabitants per square mile (192.4/km^{2}). The 37 housing units had an average density of 190.1 per square mile (73.4/km^{2}). The racial makeup of the town was 95.88% White, 2.06% Native American, and 2.06% from two or more races. One person (1.03% of the population) was Hispanic or Latino of any race.

Of the 35 households, 28.6% had children under 18 living with them, 65.7% were married couples living together, 5.7% had a female householder with no husband present, and 25.7% were not families. About 14.3% of all households were made up of individuals, and 2.9% had someone living alone who was 65 or older. The average household size was 2.77 and the average family size was 3.15.

In the town, the age distribution was 21.6% under the age of 18, 9.3% from 18 to 24, 29.9% from 25 to 44, 22.7% from 45 to 64, and 16.5% who were 65 or older. The median age was 38 years. For every 100 females, there were 110.9 males. For every 100 females 18 and over, there were 111.1 males.

The median income for a household in the town was $44,063, and for a family was $55,000. Males had a median income of $43,750 versus $31,250 for females. The per capita income for the town was $21,518. None of the population and none of the families were below the poverty line.

== Economy ==
- Happy Cow Creamery is near Pelzer and has a Pelzer zip code, but it is technically in Ware Place. A handful of businesses operate along Hwy 8 (Lebby St.) in the mill town.
- The Mill Town Players are a community theater that operates on Lebby Street. The theater has brought visitors from all over that state and is one of the most attended community theaters in South Carolina.

== Photographs ==
Photographs of the mill, village, and community can be viewed in the Greenville County Library System digital collections.

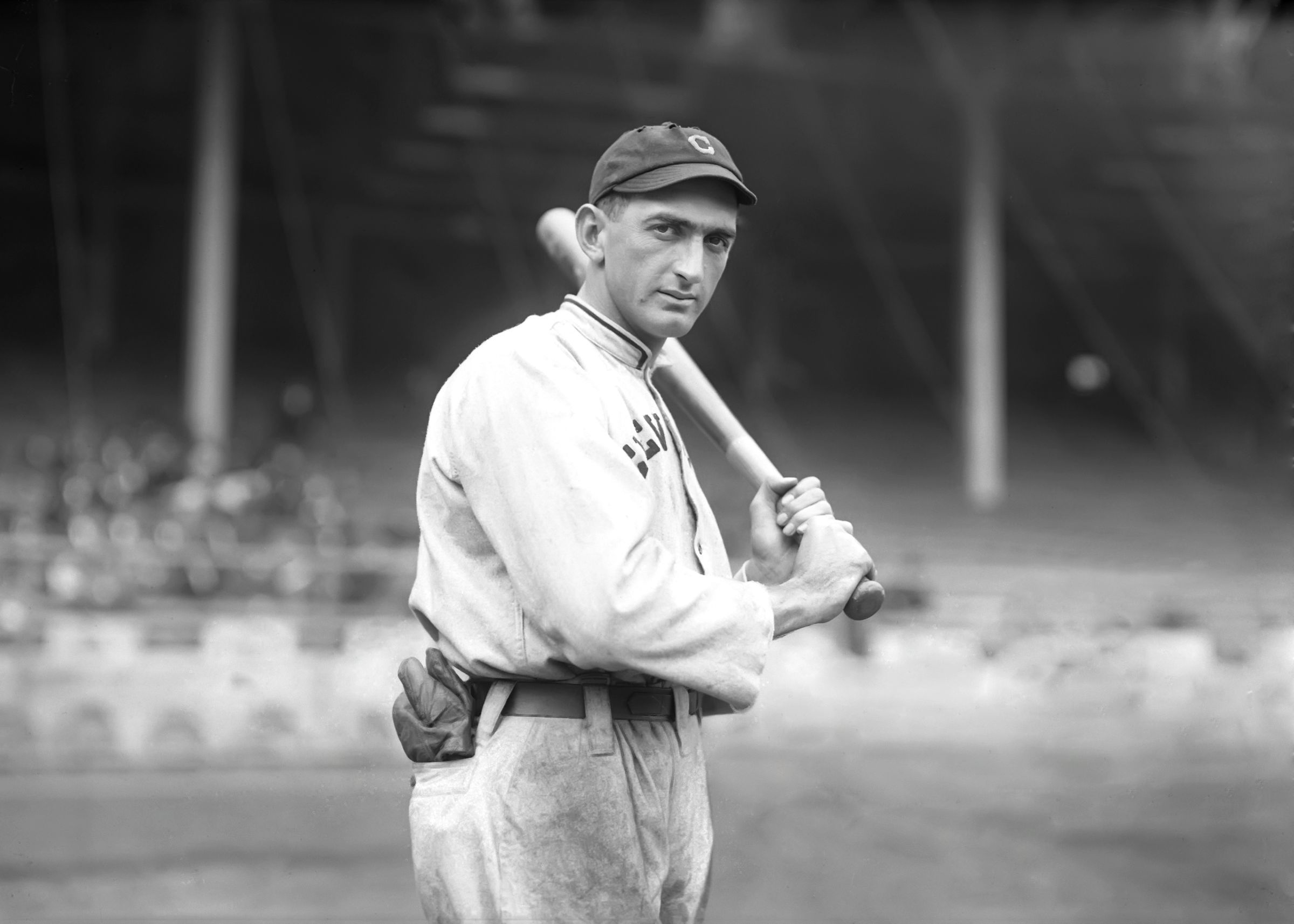
Shoeless Joe Jackson

== Notable people ==
- Mac Arnold, legendary local blues musician, was born in nearby Ware Place and now lives (and farms) in Pelzer.
- Shoeless Joe Jackson, professional baseball player, lived in Pelzer as a child and played briefly for the mill team.
- William L. McKittrick, a marine aviator during World War II, reaching the rank of major general, was born is Pelzer.
- Junior Wooten, professional baseball player, was born in Pelzer.
