= West Pelzer, South Carolina =

West Pelzer
- Town
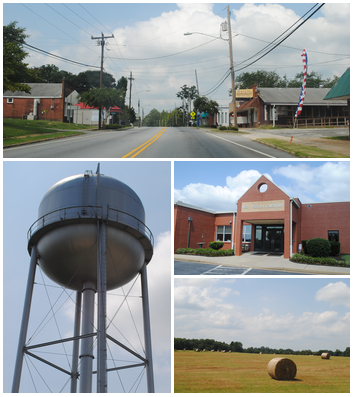
- Top, left to right: Main Street, Water tower, West Pelzer Elementary School, field with bales of hay

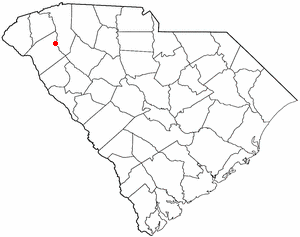
- Location of West Pelzer, South Carolina
- Coordinates: 34°38′47″N 82°28′30″W
- Country: United States
- State: South Carolina
- County: Anderson

Area
  - Total: 0.53 sq mi (1.36 km^{2})
  - Land: 0.53 sq mi (1.36 km^{2})
  - Water: 0 sq mi (0.00 km^{2})
- Elevation: 846 ft (258 m)

Population (2020)
  - Total: 962
  - Density: 1,833.7/sq mi (707.99/km^{2})
- Time zone: UTC-5 (Eastern (EST))
  - Summer (DST): UTC-4 (EDT)
- FIPS code: 45-76345
- GNIS feature ID: 2406864
- Website: westpelzer.com

West Pelzer is a town in Anderson County, South Carolina, United States. The population was 962 at the 2020 census.

== Geography ==
West Pelzer is located in northeast Anderson County. It is bordered to the east by the town of Pelzer, along the Saluda River. Williamston is 2 miles (3 km) to the south.

According to the United States Census Bureau, the town has a total area of 0.50 square miles (1.3 km^{2}), all land.

== Demographics ==
Historical population
Census	Pop.	Note	%±
1930	355		—
1940	448		26.2%
1950	578		29.0%
1960	687		18.9%
1970	861		25.3%
1980	944		9.6%
1990	989		4.8%
2000	879		−11.1%
2010	880		0.1%
2020	962		9.3%
2022 (est.)	990	▲	2.9%
U.S. Decennial Census

As of the census of 2000, there were 879 people, 395 households, and 250 families residing in the town. The population density was 1,796.4 inhabitants per square mile (693.6/km^{2}). There were 440 housing units at an average density of 899.2 per square mile (347.2/km^{2}). The racial makeup of the town was 95.11% White, 3.75% African American, 0.23% Asian, and 0.91% from two or more races. Hispanic or Latino people of any race were 0.80% of the population.

There were 395 households, out of which 28.4% had children under the age of 18 living with them, 40.8% were married couples living together, 17.5% had a female householder with no husband present, and 36.5% were non-families. 33.2% of all households were made up of individuals, and 14.9% had someone living alone who was 65 years of age or older. The average household size was 2.23 and the average family size was 2.77.

In the town, the population was spread out, with 23.3% under the age of 18, 11.4% from 18 to 24, 28.0% from 25 to 44, 22.9% from 45 to 64, and 14.4% who were 65 years of age or older. The median age was 36 years. For every 100 females, there were 85.4 males. For every 100 females age 18 and over, there were 80.2 males.

The median income for a household in the town was $28,375, and the median income for a family was $34,702. Males had a median income of $30,500 versus $23,250 for females. The per capita income for the town was $14,781. About 15.3% of families and 18.1% of the population were below the poverty line, including 26.7% of those under age 18 and 12.6% of those age 65 or over.

== Emergency services ==
- Emergency medical services - Paramedic level service is provided by Anderson County EMS, utilizing quick response vehicles which are equipped and staffed at the paramedic level. Basic life support transport is provided by Medshore Ambulance Service through a contract with Anderson County.
- Fire - Fire/rescue service is provided by the West Pelzer Fire Department. This is a volunteer fire department, which is a part of the Anderson County Fire Department. Mutual aid backup is also provided to and from the Williamston Fire Department, South Greenville Fire Department, Piedmont Fire Department, Wren Fire Department, and Whitefield Fire Department.
- Law enforcement - The West Pelzer Police department provides services to the town. They are backed up, when necessary, by the Anderson County Sheriff's Office and the Williamston Police Department. The department also provides mutual aid backup to those agencies as requested.
