= Slater-Marietta, South Carolina =

- Census-designated place
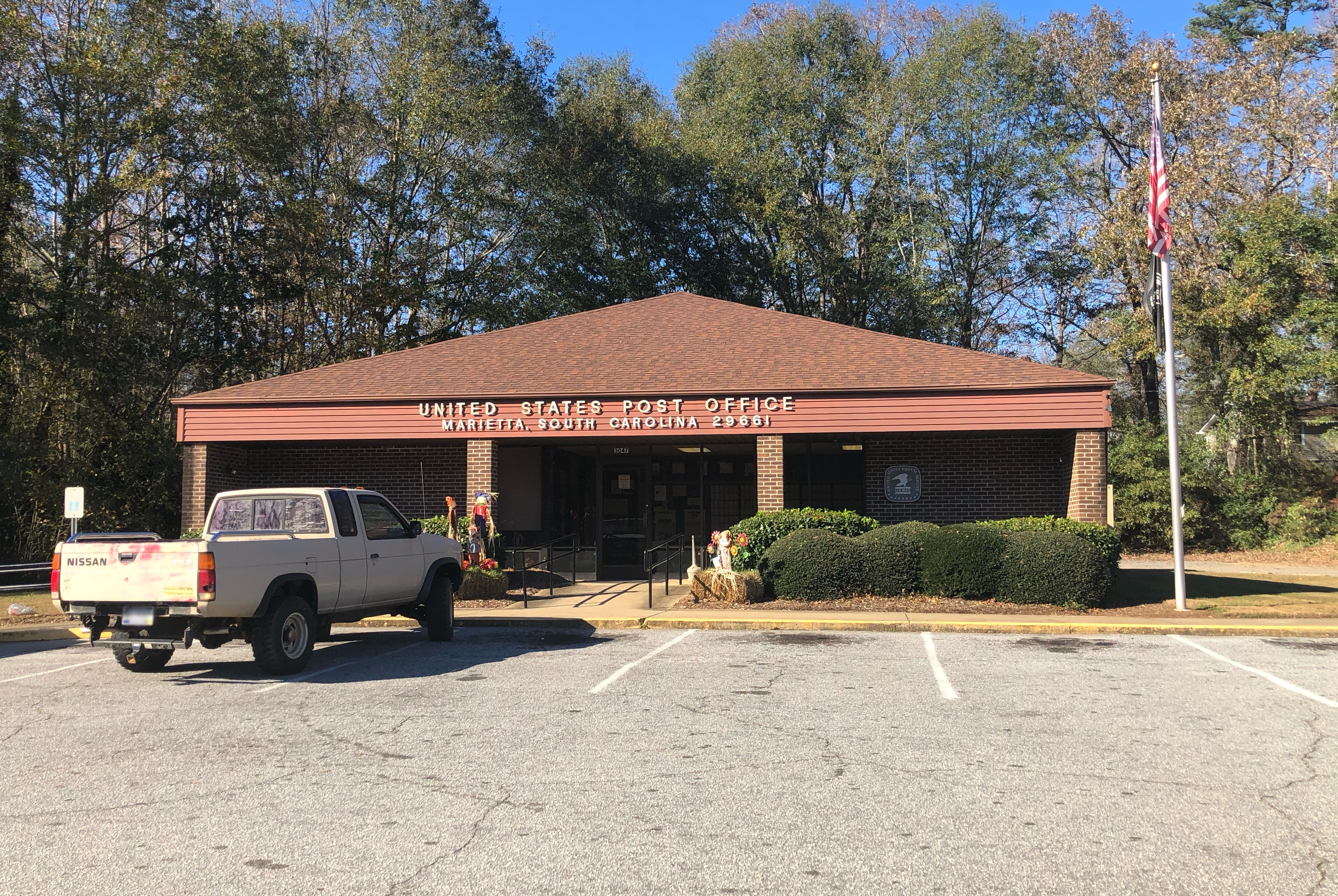
- Marietta post office
- Nickname: Southern Town
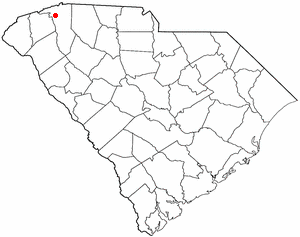
- Location of Slater-Marietta, South Carolina
- Coordinates: 35°01′58″N 82°29′53″W <-- Area/postal codes and others -->
- Country: United States
- State: South Carolina
- County: Greenville

Area
  - Total: 4.31 sq mi (11.17 km^{2})
  - Land: 4.31 sq mi (11.16 km^{2})
  - Water: 0.0077 sq mi (0.02 km^{2})
- Elevation: 1,056 ft (322 m)

Population (2020)
  - Total: 2,087
  - Density: 484.4/sq mi (187.03/km^{2})
- Time zone: UTC-5 (Eastern (EST))
  - Summer (DST): UTC-4 (EDT)
- ZIP Codes: 29661 (Marietta); 29683 (Slater)
- Area code: 864
- FIPS code: 45-66917
- GNIS feature ID: 2402860

Slater-Marietta is a census-designated place (CDP) in Greenville County, South Carolina, United States, along the North Saluda River. At the 2000 census, there were 2,228 people. At the 2010 census, there were 2,176. At the 2020 census, there were 1,873. It is part of the Greenville–Mauldin–Easley Metropolitan Statistical Area.

== History ==
J. Harvey Cleveland, born in 1815, invested in land in northern Greenville County, including a 300-acre (1.2-million m^{2}) tract along the North Saluda River which he bought from his father-in-law about 1840. Cleveland expanded the simple home on the property and made it his family home. He also plotted a nearby settlement, named "Marietta" after his wife, Mary Louisa Williams.

Though in an otherwise favorable location, the resulting village was slow to grow, possibly because the only direct access to the area was via the dangerous Jones Gap Road. The CK&W rail line that became nicknamed the Swamp Rabbit was laid past Marietta in the late 1880s. In the 1920s, the Geer Highway was built through the area, a new reservoir provided water, and electricity was eventually provided by Duke Power.

In 1927, the Slater family announced they would build a 30,000-square-foot (2,800 m^{2}) mill nearby and a Slater village around it, on land bought from Cleveland family members. The Slaters had started Slater Mill, the first textile mill in America, in Rhode Island in 1790, and built the village of Slatersville in 1803 and then other mills in Massachusetts before moving their operations to South Carolina. The new Slater Mill opened in 1928, was very successful, and overwhelmed the two communities, which became referred to as Slater-Marietta.

In 1934, H. Nelson Slater, the mill founder, built Slater Hall, a community center for Slater village. In 1946, the Slaters sold their mill to J.P. Stevens & Company, and the J.P. Stevens' Slater Plant went on to produce the main material for the space suits used on the first Moon landing in 1969 as well as Space Shuttle components. In 2016, JPS Composite Materials owned the mill, which was mainly producing fiber glass, and sold it to B&W Fiber Glass.

== Geography ==
Marietta is located in northern Greenville County. The CDP consists of two adjoining communities, both unincorporated: Slater and Marietta. Each community has its own post office and ZIP Code. U.S. Route 276 passes through Marietta, while Slater is directly to the east. US 276 leads south 15 miles (24 km) to Greenville and northwest 19 miles (31 km) to the North Carolina border at the crest of the Blue Ridge Mountains. South Carolina Highway 288 leads west from Marietta 9 miles (14 km) to Pumpkintown.

According to the United States Census Bureau, the CDP has a total area of 4.3 square miles (11.2 km^{2}), of which 0.01 square miles (0.02 km^{2}), or 0.14%, are water.

== Demographics ==
Historical population
| Census | Pop. | Note | %± |
|---|---|---|---|
| 2020 | 2,087 | | — |
U.S. Decennial Census

=== 2020 census ===
Slater-Marietta racial composition
| Race | Num. | Perc. |
|---|---|---|
| White (non-Hispanic) | 1,767 | 84.67% |
| Black or African American (non-Hispanic) | 16 | 0.77% |
| Native American | 3 | 0.14% |
| Asian | 7 | 0.34% |
| Other/Mixed | 87 | 4.17% |
| Hispanic or Latino | 207 | 9.92% |

As of the 2020 United States census, there were 2,087 people, 673 households, and 408 families residing in the CDP.

=== 2000 census ===
As of the census of 2000, there were 2,228 people, 875 households, and 594 families residing in the CDP. The population density was 518.5 inhabitants per square mile (200.2/km^{2}). There were 989 housing units at an average density of 230.2 per square mile (88.9/km^{2}). The racial makeup of the CDP was 95.96% White, 0.81% African American, 0.04% Native American, 0.04% Asian, 0.04% Pacific Islander, 2.29% from other races, and 0.81% from two or more races. Hispanic or Latino of any race were 7.99% of the population.

There were 875 households, out of which 30.1% had children under the age of 18 living with them, 50.7% were married couples living together, 11.2% had a female householder with no husband present, and 32.1% were non-families. 26.4% of all households were made up of individuals, and 11.5% had someone living alone who was 65 years of age or older. The average household size was 2.48 and the average family size was 2.94.

In the CDP, the population was spread out, with 23.6% under the age of 18, 10.0% from 18 to 24, 30.6% from 25 to 44, 21.0% from 45 to 64, and 14.9% who were 65 years of age or older. The median age was 36 years. For every 100 females, there were 98.8 males. For every 100 females age 18 and over, there were 92.2 males.

The median income for a household in the CDP was $30,898, and the median income for a family was $36,190. Males had a median income of $26,950 versus $23,603 for females. The per capita income for the CDP was $17,169. About 12.7% of families and 17.8% of the population were below the poverty line, including 14.0% of those under age 18 and 16.5% of those age 65 or over.
