= South Carolina Highway 88 =

State highway in South Carolina, United States

South Carolina Highway 88

Route information
- Maintained by SCDOT
- Length: 14.350 mi (23.094 km)
- Existed: 1960s–present

Major junctions
- West end: North Broad Street in Pendleton
- US 178 near Liberty
- East end: SC 8 near Powdersville

Location
- Country: United States
- State: South Carolina
- Counties: Anderson, Pickens

Highway system
- South Carolina State Highway System; Interstate; US; State; Scenic
| ← SC 86 | → SC 90 |

South Carolina Highway 88 (SC 88) is a 14.350-mile (23.094 km) state highway in northern Anderson County, South Carolina with a brief entry into southern Pickens County, connecting Pendleton and areas south of Powdersville.

== Route description ==
The route travels generally in a west–east direction, signed to begin at an intersection with SC 28 Business (SC 28 Bus.; North Mechanic Street) in downtown Pendleton. However, SCDOT designates the western terminus to not start until North Broad Street a few blocks later. East of Pendleton, SC 88 travels through somewhat rural areas and has a roundabout intersection with US 178. The route continues until it terminates at an intersection with SC 8, west of the suburban areas of Powdersville.

== Major intersections ==
| County | Location | mi | km | Destinations | Notes |
|---|---|---|---|---|---|
| Anderson | Pendleton | −0.150 | −0.241 | SC 28 Bus. (North Mechanic Street) / West Queen Street – Anderson, Clemson, Tri-County Technical College, Woodburn Historical Home, Riverside Middle School | Signed western terminus |
| Anderson | Pendleton | 0.000 | 0.000 | North Broad Street / East Queen Street west – Tri-County Technical College | Official western terminus; East Queen Street continues past intersection. |
| Pickens | No major junctions | | | | |
| Anderson | | 7.870 | 12.666 | US 178 (Liberty Highway) – Anderson, Liberty | Roundabout intersection |
| Anderson | | 14.350 | 23.094 | SC 8 (Pelzer Highway) – Pelzer, Easley, Greenville | |
1.000 mi = 1.609 km; 1.000 km = 0.621 mi
