= Sunset, South Carolina =

- Unincorporated community
- Location within South Carolina Location within the United States
- Coordinates: 34°58′39″N 82°47′56″W
- Country: United States
- State: South Carolina
- County: Pickens
- Elevation: 1,024 ft (312 m)
- Time zone: UTC-5 (Eastern (EST))
  - Summer (DST): UTC-4 (EDT)
- ZIP code: 29685
- Area codes: 864, 821
- GNIS feature ID: 1226969

Sunset is an unincorporated community in Pickens County, South Carolina, United States. The community is located along South Carolina Highway 11 8.3 miles (13.4 km) northwest of Pickens. Sunset has a post office with ZIP code 29685, which opened on January 11, 1906.
