= Carolina, Knoxville and Western Railway =

The Carolina, Knoxville, and Western Railway was a railroad in the southeastern United States, established in 1887 to build a line connecting Augusta, Georgia, and Knoxville, Tennessee. Despite ambitious plans, only about 14 miles of track were laid before financial difficulties led to the suspension of construction. The railway was intended to facilitate coal transportation and provide a direct route over the Appalachian Mountains. After insolvency in 1894, the line was eventually abandoned in 1899.

== Formation ==
The railway was formed in 1887 with the goal of building a rail line from Augusta, Georgia to Knoxville, Tennessee. Financing was accomplished through bond sales. The company consolidated that same year with the Pennsylvania and Haywood Railroad and the Atlantic, Greenville and Western Railway to operate under the Carolina, Knoxville, and Western Railway moniker.

The newly formed company began construction on a route from Greenville, South Carolina to Marietta, South Carolina. Approximately 14 miles of rail were laid, and additional grading was completed before work was suspended due to the financial collapse of the Georgia Construction and Investment Co., which had the contract for the entire project. The railway was intended to bring coal from Tennessee to South Carolina and provide a direct route over the mountains.

== Financial troubles and abandonment ==
By 1894, the Carolina, Knoxville and Western Railway faced insolvency. Its president, Joseph B. Humbert, filed a lawsuit in an attempt to recover unpaid wages. Despite efforts to revive the railway, including the formation of the Greenville and Knoxville Railroad in 1907, the line was fully abandoned by 1899.

Remnants of the South Carolina portion of the railway can still be seen alongside U.S. Route 276, particularly around Marietta, South Carolina. The remaining tracks were removed in 2006.
