= Dacusville, South Carolina =

Settlement in South Carolina, United States

Dacusville
- Census-designated place
- Location within South Carolina Location within the United States
- Coordinates: 34°56′03″N 82°33′38″W
- Country: United States
- State: South Carolina
- County: Pickens

Area
  - Total: 2.20 sq mi (5.69 km^{2})
  - Land: 2.20 sq mi (5.69 km^{2})
  - Water: 0 sq mi (0.00 km^{2})
- Elevation: 1,093 ft (333 m)

Population (2020)
  - Total: 399
  - Density: 181.8/sq mi (70.18/km^{2})
- Time zone: UTC-5 (Eastern (EST))
  - Summer (DST): UTC-4 (EDT)
- ZIP code: 29640
- Area codes: 864, 821
- FIPS code: 45-18250
- GNIS feature ID: 2812985

Dacusville is a small unincorporated community and census-designated place (CDP) in Pickens County, South Carolina, United States. It was first listed as a CDP in the 2020 census with a population of 399.

Hester Store was listed on the National Register of Historic Places in 2013.

Dacusville is located in the Greenville-Anderson Metropolitan Statistical Area and the Greenville-Spartanburg-Anderson Combined Statistical Area.

== History ==
Dacusville was named for Archibald Dacus. Dacus was born in Lunenburg County, Virginia, in 1769, to John and Mara Dacus. In the late seventeen hundreds, he moved with several of his family to Upper State South Carolina. He ran a trading post on the old Indian Road that ran from Virginia through North and South Carolina into Georgia territory, at what soon came to be called Dacusville, to trade with the Indians and passers-by, as well as local people. It is said that this was first called "The Trap". This was also a stagecoach stop. History relates there had been a post office in this vicinity since Revolutionary War days which had been operated from more than one location by various people. Archibald Dacus began to operate the post office from his trading post (store) and the place was called "Dacusville" after him.

== Demographics ==
Historical population
| Census | Pop. | Note | %± |
|---|---|---|---|
| 2020 | 399 | | — |
U.S. Decennial Census; 2020

Dacusville first appeared as a census designated place in the 2020 census.

=== 2020 census ===
Dacusville CDP, South Carolina – Demographic Profile (NH = Non-Hispanic)
| Race / Ethnicity | Pop 2020 | % 2020 |
|---|---|---|
| White alone (NH) | 369 | 92.48% |
| Black or African American alone (NH) | 1 | 0.25% |
| Native American or Alaska Native alone (NH) | 0 | 0.00% |
| Asian alone (NH) | 2 | 0.50% |
| Pacific Islander alone (NH) | 0 | 0.00% |
| Some Other Race alone (NH) | 0 | 0.00% |
| Mixed Race/Multi-Racial (NH) | 22 | 5.51% |
| Hispanic or Latino (any race) | 5 | 1.25% |
| Total | 399 | 100.00% |

Note: the US Census treats Hispanic/Latino as an ethnic category. This table excludes Latinos from the racial categories and assigns them to a separate category. Hispanics/Latinos can be of any race.
