= Ware Place, South Carolina =

- Census-designated place
- Location within South Carolina Location within the United States
- Coordinates: 34°37′30″N 82°23′17″W
- Country: United States
- State: South Carolina
- County: Greenville

Area
  - Total: 0.92 sq mi (2.38 km^{2})
  - Land: 0.92 sq mi (2.38 km^{2})
  - Water: 0 sq mi (0.00 km^{2})
- Elevation: 879 ft (268 m)

Population (2020)
  - Total: 273
  - Density: 298/sq mi (114.9/km^{2})
- Time zone: UTC-5 (Eastern (EST))
  - Summer (DST): UTC-4 (EDT)
- ZIP codes: 29669
- FIPS code: 45045
- GNIS feature ID: 2629839

Ware Place is a Census-designated place located in Greenville County in the U.S. State of South Carolina. According to the 2010 United States census, the population was 228.

== Geography ==
Ware Place is located on the southwestern side of the county, near the border with Anderson County.

According to the United States Census Bureau, the CDP has a total land area of 0.917 square mile (2.37 km^{2}) and a total water area of 0.001 square mile (0.003 km^{2}).

== Demographics ==
Historical population
Census	Pop.	Note	%±
2020	273		—
U.S. Decennial Census
