= Pumpkintown, South Carolina =

- Unincorporated community
- Nickname: "Punkin'town"
- Location of Pumpkintown in South Carolina
- Coordinates: 35°00′10″N 82°39′10″W
- Country: United States
- State: South Carolina
- County: Pickens County
- Settled: 1745
- Elevation: 958 ft (292 m)
- Time zone: UTC-5 (Eastern (EST))
  - Summer (DST): UTC-4 (EDT)
- GNIS feature ID: 1250271
- Other names: Pumpkin Town; Punkin Town

Pumpkintown is an unincorporated community in Pickens County, South Carolina, United States, on State Highway 8 northwest of Greenville.

== History ==
The area now known as Pumpkintown was originally inhabited by the Cherokee people. In 1745, Cornelius Keith became the first recorded white settler when he moved to the Oolenoy River valley. According to local tradition, Keith acquired the land from a Cherokee leader known as Chief Woolenoy in exchange for a pony.

The community's name originated during the late 18th century; however, the etymology of the name Pumkintown is debated. Two primary accounts exist regarding the origins of the name. The first suggests that during a community "corn shuckins" gathering, settlers were debating a name for the site. An intoxicated man, noting the abundant "monstrous pumpkins" and Tennessee white corn, suggested the name "Pumpkintown". An alternative theory posits that North Carolina cattlemen, who frequently passed through the valley on their way to markets, named the area for the visible density of gourds in the fields.

By 1791, Pumpkintown was one of only two established towns in what is now Pickens County, alongside Pickensville (later known as Easley). The region saw significant changes in the 20th century, particularly following the opening of S.C. Highway 11 in 1972, which increased tourism and accessibility to nearby Table Rock State Park.

Since 1979, the community has held an annual Fall Pumpkin Festival in October. Originally organized as a fundraiser for the Pumpkintown Fire Department, the festival features local food, crafts, and a parade.
