= List of Presbyterian churches in the United States =

This is a list of notable Presbyterian churches in the United States, where a church is notable either as a congregation or as a building. In the United States, numerous churches are listed on the National Register of Historic Places or are noted on state or local historic registers. Also more than 300 Presbyterian historic sites have been listed by the Presbyterian Historical Society onto the American Presbyterian/Reformed Historic Sites Registry (APRHS); those sites which are churches are ... in progress ... being added here.

This article also includes related other items, such as various former Presbyterian meetinghouse sites, or cemeteries or parsonages that are NRHP-listed where the corresponding church building is more modern and not NRHP-listed.

== Alabama ==
Church	Image	Dates	Location	City, State	Description
Auburn University Chapel		1851 built 1900 remodeled 1973 NRHP-listed	College Street and Thach Avenue; 32°36′17″N 85°28′51″W	Auburn, Alabama	Gothic Revival
Independent Presbyterian Church		1915 founded 1922 built	3100 Highland Avenue S., Birmingham, AL 35205	Birmingham, Alabama	Gothic Revival
Briarwood Presbyterian Church		1965 founded	33.416742°N 86.760106°W	Birmingham, Alabama	Postmodern
First Presbyterian Church (Birmingham, Alabama)		1888 built 1982 NRHP-listed	2100 4th Ave., N 33°31′6″N 86°48′22″W	Birmingham, Alabama	Gothic Revival
Second Presbyterian Church (Birmingham, Alabama)		1901 built 1986 NRHP-listed	Tenth Ave. and Twelfth St. S 33°29′50″N 86°48′33″W	Birmingham, Alabama	Romanesque
Third Presbyterian Church (Birmingham, Alabama)		1884 founded 1902 built	617 22nd Street South; 33.5075°N 86.796944°W	Birmingham, Alabama	Gothic Revival
First Presbyterian Church (Camden, Alabama)		1880s built 2000 NRHP-listed	N 31°59′40″N 87°17′37″W	Camden, Alabama	Gothic Revival
First Presbyterian Church of Eutaw		1824 founded 1851 built 1974 NRHP-listed	Main Street and Wilson Avenue; 32°50′28″N 87°53′26″W	Eutaw, Alabama	Greek Revival
First Presbyterian Church (Greenville, Alabama)		1886 built 1986 NRHP-listed	215 E. Commerce St. 31°49′48″N 86°37′18″W	Greenville, Alabama	Romanesque
First Presbyterian Church (Jacksonville, Alabama)		1859 built 1982 NRHP-listed	200 E. Clinton St. 33°48′52″N 85°46′55″W	Jacksonville, Alabama	Romanesque
Old Brick Presbyterian Church		1835 built 1989 NRHP-listed	34°46′14″N 87°31′28″W	Leighton, Alabama	Federal
Lowndesboro Presbyterian Church		1856		Lowndesboro, Alabama	in Lowndesboro Historic District
Swift Presbyterian Church		1905 built 1988 NRHP-listed	Swift Church Rd. 30°22′31″N 87°37′40″W	Miflin, Alabama	Late Gothic Revival
Government Street Presbyterian Church		1831 founded 1836–37 built 1992 NHL-designated	300 Government Street; 30°41′22″N 88°2′37″W	Mobile, Alabama	Greek Revival, a U.S. National Historic Landmark
New Market Presbyterian Church (New Market, Alabama)		1888 built 1988 NRHP-listed	1723 New Market Rd. 34°54′37″N 86°25′46″W	New Market, Alabama	Late Gothic Revival
Pleasant Hill Presbyterian Church		1820s founded 1851 built 1999 NRHP-listed	Dallas County Road 12; 32°9′52″N 86°54′29″W	Pleasant Hill, Alabama	Greek Revival
Adams Grove Presbyterian Church		1853 built 1986 NRHP-listed	Dallas County Road 55; 32°16′19″N 87°1′50″W	Sardis, Alabama	Greek Revival
First Presbyterian Church (Talladega, Alabama)		1860 built 1983 NRHP-listed	130 North St. E 33°26′8″N 86°6′2″W	Talladega, Alabama	Romanesque, Neo-Romanesque
First Presbyterian Church (Uniontown, Alabama)		1914 built 2000 NRHP-listed	Water Avenue N 32°27′07″N 87°30′51″W	Uniontown, Alabama	Greek Revival
Valley Creek Presbyterian Church		1816 founded 1857–1859 built 1976 NRHP-listed	Dallas County Road 65; 32°28′14″N 87°1′27″W	Valley Grande, Alabama	Greek Revival
First Presbyterian Church of Wetumpka		1856 built 1976 NRHP-listed	W. Bridge St. 32°32′21″N 86°12′31″W	Wetumpka, Alabama	Gothic Revival

== Alaska ==
Church	Image	Dates	Location	City, State	Description
Presbyterian Mission to the Chilkats		APRHS 260		Haines, Alaska	

== Arizona ==
Church	Image	Dates	Location	City, State	Description
Presbyterian Church Parsonage (Flagstaff, Arizona)			15 E. Cherry (parsonage); 35°11′59″N 111°38′47″W	Flagstaff, Arizona	Its Queen Anne style Presbyterian Church Parsonage is NRHP-listed
First Presbyterian Church of Florence		1931 built 1994 NRHP-listed	225 E. Butte Ave. 33°1′51″N 111°23′4″W	Florence, Arizona	Wallingford & Bell-designed, Mission/Spanish Revival
Old Presbyterian Church (Parker, Arizona)		1917 built 1971 NRHP-listed	34°6′45″N 114°18′48″W	Parker, Arizona	
First Presbyterian Church of Peoria		2012 NRHP-listed	10236 N. 83rd Ave. 33°34′41″N 112°14′17″W	Peoria, Arizona	
First Presbyterian Church (Phoenix, Arizona)		1927 built 1993 NRHP-listed	402 W. Monroe St. 33°27′2″N 112°4′43″W	Phoenix, Arizona	Mission/Spanish Revival

== Arkansas ==
Church	Image	Dates	Location	City, State	Description
Augusta Presbyterian Church		1871 built 1986 NRHP-listed	Third and Walnut Sts. 35°17′11″N 91°21′57″W	Augusta, Arkansas	
United Presbyterian Church of Canehill		1891 built 1982 NRHP-listed	Main St. 35°54′36″N 94°23′46″W	Canehill, Arkansas	Late Gothic Revival
Cumberland Presbyterian Church (Clarendon, Arkansas)		1869 built 1976 NRHP-listed	120 Washington St. 34°41′42″N 91°18′44″W	Clarendon, Arkansas	Greek Revival
First Presbyterian Church (Clarksville, Arkansas)		1922 built 1991 NRHP-listed	212 College Ave. 35°28′21″N 93°27′57″W	Clarksville, Arkansas	Classical Revival
Columbus Presbyterian Church		1875 built 1982 NRHP-listed	AR 73; 33°46′42″N 93°49′3″W	Columbus, Arkansas	Greek Revival destroyed in 2008
First Presbyterian Church (Dardanelle, Arkansas)		1912 built 1987 NRHP-listed	Second and Quay Sts. 35°13′15″N 93°9′17″W	Dardanelle, Arkansas	Classical Revival
First Presbyterian Church-Berry House		1872 built 1998 NRHP-listed	203 Pecan St. 35°13′3″N 93°9′15″W	Dardanelle, Arkansas	Bungalow/craftsman, Plain traditional, other
First Presbyterian Church (DeQueen, Arkansas)		1898 built 1994 NRHP-listed	Jct. of Vandervoort and N. Fifth Sts., SW corner 34°2′24″N 94°20′34″W	DeQueen, Arkansas	Late Gothic Revival, Bungalow/craftsman
First Presbyterian Church (Des Arc, Arkansas)		1990 NRHP-listed	Jct. of Main and 5th Sts. 34°58′38″N 91°29′52″W	Des Arc, Arkansas	Colonial Revival, Vernacular Colonial Revival
First Presbyterian Church (El Dorado, Arkansas)		1926 built 1991 NRHP-listed	300 E. Main; 33°12′44″N 92°39′41″W	El Dorado, Arkansas	Late 19th and 20th Century Revivals, Collegiate Gothic
Walnut Grove Presbyterian Church		1903 built 1995 NRHP-listed	36°0′8″N 94°16′3″W	Farmington, Arkansas	Romanesque, Late Gothic Revival
First Presbyterian Church (Fordyce, Arkansas)		1912 built 1983 NRHP-listed	AR 79B; 33°48′47″N 92°24′53″W	Fordyce, Arkansas	Late Gothic Revival
Greenwood Presbyterian Church		1922 built 2008 NRHP-listed	103 W. Denver St. 35°13′3″N 94°15′30″W	Greenwood, Arkansas	Late Gothic Revival
First Presbyterian Church (Fort Smith, Arkansas)				Fort Smith, Arkansas	
Hamburg Presbyterian Church		1920 built 1991 NRHP-listed	Jct. of Cherry and Lincoln Sts. 33°13′32″N 91°47′40″W	Hamburg, Arkansas	Bungalow/craftsman
Harmony Presbyterian Church		1915 built 1994 NRHP-listed	AR 103, N side, approximately 8 mi. N of Clarksville; 35°33′2″N 93°34′13″W	Harmony, Arkansas	Late Gothic Revival
Holly Grove Presbyterian Church		1991 NRHP-listed	310 Second St. 36°19′28″N 91°9′34″W	Holly Grove, Arkansas	Greek Revival, Gothic Revival
First Presbyterian Church (Hot Springs, Arkansas)		1907 built 1982 NRHP-listed	213 Whittington; 34°30′58″N 93°3′33″W	Hot Springs, Arkansas	Late Gothic Revival, designed by Charles L. Thompson
Orange Street Presbyterian Church		1913 built 2002 NRHP-listed	428 Orange St. 34°30′20″N 93°3′22″W	Hot Springs, Arkansas	Classical Revival
Associated Reformed Presbyterian Church		1925 built 1982 NRHP-listed	3323 W. 12th St. 34°44′24″N 92°18′40″W	Little Rock, Arkansas	Charles L. Thompson-designed, Classical Revival
Central Presbyterian Church (Little Rock, Arkansas)		1921 built 1982 NRHP-listed	1921 Arch St. 34°43′47″N 92°16′45″W	Little Rock, Arkansas	Thompson & Harding-designed with Late Gothic Revival, Bungalow/Craftsman architecture
First Presbyterian Church (Little Rock, Arkansas)		1921 built 1986 NRHP-listed	123 E. Eighth St. 34°44′26″N 92°16′15″W	Little Rock, Arkansas	John Parks Almand and Charles L. Thompson-designed, Late 19th and 20th Century Revivals, English Gothic, Other
First Presbyterian Church (Lonoke, Arkansas)		1919 built 2004 NRHP-listed	304 S. Center St. 34°46′53″N 91°54′1″W	Lonoke, Arkansas	John Parks Almand-designed, Tudor Revival
Mount Olive Cumberland Presbyterian Church		1916 built 2004 NRHP-listed	Jct. of Izard Cty Rds 12 and 18; 36°0′2″N 92°5′41″W	Mount Olive, Arkansas	
First Presbyterian Church (Nashville, Arkansas)		1912 built 1976 NRHP-listed	2nd and Hempstead Sts. 34°56′40″N 93°51′35″W	Nashville, Arkansas	Stick/Eastlake, High Victorian Gothic
First Presbyterian Church of Newport		1910 built 1982 NRHP-listed	4th and Main streets 35°36′12″N 91°16′55″W	Newport, Arkansas	Neoclassical
First Presbyterian Church (North Little Rock, Arkansas)		1927 built (manse); 1993 NRHP-listed (manse)	415 N. Maple St. 34°45′30″N 92°16′9″W	North Little Rock, Arkansas	Church whose manse, the First Presbyterian Church Manse (North Little Rock, Arkansas), is NRHP-listed. Bungalow/craftsman.
Mt. Zion Presbyterian Church (Relfs Bluff, Arkansas)		1925 built 1988 NRHP-listed	AR 81; 33°47′31″N 91°50′19″W	Relfs Bluff, Arkansas	Bungalow/craftsman
Caney Springs Cumberland Presbyterian Church		1995 NRHP-listed	36°3′40″N 91°49′9″W	Sage, Arkansas	Plain Traditional and other architecture
Cumberland Presbyterian Church (Searcy, Arkansas)		1903 built 1992 NRHP-listed	Jct. of Race and Spring Sts. 35°15′3″N 91°44′14″W	Searcy, Arkansas	Classical Revival, Romanesque
First Presbyterian Church (Stamps, Arkansas)		1905 built 1996 NRHP-listed	Jct. of Market and Church Sts., SW corner 33°21′42″N 93°29′40″W	Stamps, Arkansas	Late Gothic Revival
Old School Presbyterian Church (Van Buren, Arkansas)		1903 built 2009 NRHP-listed	421 Webster St. 35°26′11″N 94°21′15″W	Van Buren, Arkansas	Gothic Revival

== California ==
Church	Image	Dates	Location	City, State	Description
First Presbyterian Church Sanctuary Building		1904 built 1980 NRHP-listed	2001 Santa Clara Ave. 37°46′11″N 122°15′0″W	Alameda, California	Classical Revival, Renaissance
St. John's Presbyterian Church (Berkeley, California)		1910 built 1975 NRHP-listed	2640 College Ave. 37°51′44″N 122°15′8″W	Berkeley, California	Craftsman
Felton Presbyterian Church (historic building)		1891 founded 1893 built 1978 NRHP-listed	6299 Gushee St. 37°3′10″N 122°4′24″W	Felton, California	Victorian former church building listed as Felton Presbyterian Church on the NRHP
Bel Air Presbyterian Church		1956 founded 1991 built	16221 Mulholland Drive; 34°7′49″N 118°29′8″W	Los Angeles, California	Modern
First Presbyterian Church of Hollywood		1903 founded 1923 built	1760 North Gower Street; 34°6′11″N 118°19′19″W	Hollywood, Los Angeles, California	Gothic Revival
Mendocino Presbyterian Church		1867–68 built 1971 NRHP-listed (contributing)	44831 Main Street; 39°18′17.6″N 123°47′48.1″W	Mendocino, California	Carpenter Gothic
Menlo Park Presbyterian Church		1873 founded 1950 built	37.4493°N 122.1877°W	Menlo Park, California	One of "50 most influential" churches in the United States
First Presbyterian Church (Napa, California)		1874 built 1975 NRHP-listed	1333 3rd St. 38°17′46″N 122°17′9″W	Napa, California	Gothic
Westminster Presbyterian Church (Los Angeles)		1904 founded 1931 built 1980 Los Angeles Historic-Cultural Monument No. 229	2230 West Jefferson Blvd; 34°1′31.04″N 118°19′11.27″W	Los Angeles, California	Romanesque
Westminster Presbyterian Church (Sacramento, CA)		1927 built 2003 NRHP-listed	1300 N St. 38°34′35″N 121°29′27″W	Sacramento, California	Mission/Spanish Revival
Calvary Presbyterian Church		1901 built 1978 NRHP-listed	2501-2515 Fillmore St. 37°47′34″N 122°26′1″W	San Francisco, California	Late 19th And 20th Century Revivals, Edwardian, Other
St. John's Presbyterian Church (San Francisco, California)		1905 built 196 NRHP-listed	25 Lake St. and 201 Arguello Blvd. 37°47′12″N 122°27′31″W	San Francisco, California	Shingle Style
Trinity Presbyterian Church (San Francisco, California)		1891 built 1982 NRHP-listed	3261 23rd St. 37°45′59″N 122°25′1″W	San Francisco, California	Percy & Hamilton-designed in Romanesque style
First Presbyterian Church (San Luis Obispo, California)		1875 founded 1904 built	981 Marsh Street	San Luis Obispo, California	
First Presbyterian Church (Templeton, California)		founded built		Templeton, California	
Tomales Presbyterian Church and Cemetery		1868 built 1975 NRHP-listed	11 Church St. 38°14′43″N 122°54′22″W	Tomales, California	
First Presbyterian Church		1862 founded 1955 built NRHP-listed	1350 Amador Street; 38°6′49″N 122°16′6″W	Vallejo, California	
Sarang Community Church (PCA)		1988 founded NRHP-listed	1111 North Brookhurst Street, Anaheim, CA; 38°6′49″N 122°16′6″W	Anaheim, California	Largest Presbyterian Church in the PCA & America with 22,000 attenders and 8,000 Sunday School Children

== Colorado ==
Church	Image	Dates	Location	City, State	Description
First Presbyterian Church (Canon City, Colorado)		1900 built 1983 NRHP-listed	Macon and 7th Sts. 38°26′35″N 105°14′18″W	Canon City, Colorado	Late Victorian
First Presbyterian Church (Colorado Springs, Colorado)				Colorado Springs, Colorado	
First Presbyterian Church of Eckert		1921 built 2006 NRHP-listed	13011 and 13025 CO 65; 38°49′42″N 107°58′14″W	Eckert, Colorado	Bungalow/Craftsman, Rustic, Other
St. Mark United Presbyterian Church		1880 built 1980 NRHP-listed	225 Main St. 39°13′13″N 104°32′14″W	Elbert, Colorado	
South Park Community Church		1874 built 1977 NRHP-listed	6th and Hathaway streets 39°13′29″N 105°59′57″W	Fairplay, Colorado	Carpenter Gothic
First Presbyterian Church of Golden		1872 built 1991 NRHP-listed	809 15th Street; 39°45′9″N 105°13′7″W	Golden, Colorado	Gothic Revival
First Presbyterian Church of Ramah		1916 built 1988 NRHP-listed	113 S. Commercial St. 39°7′13″N 104°10′2″W	Ramah, Colorado	Mission/Spanish Revival, Spanish Colonial Revival, other architecture
Rankin Presbyterian Church		1907 built 2007 NRHP-listed	420 Clayton St. 40°15′30″N 103°37′23″W	Brush, Colorado	Late Gothic Revival
Emmanuel Presbyterian Church (Colorado Springs, Colorado)		1903 built 1984 NRHP-listed	419 Mesa Rd. 38°50′45″N 104°49′54″W	Colorado Springs, Colorado	
Central Presbyterian Church (Denver, Colorado)		1891 built 1974 NRHP-listed	1660 Sherman St. 39°44′35″N 104°59′2″W	Denver, Colorado	Richardsonian Romanesque, Other
Montview Boulevard Presbyterian Church		1910 built 2004 NRHP-listed	1980 Dahlia St. 39°44′49″N 104°55′52″W	Denver, Colorado	Romanesque, Gothic Revival
First United Presbyterian Church (Loveland, Colorado)		1906 built 2004 NRHP-listed	400 E. 4th St. 40°23′43″N 105°4′16″W	Loveland, Colorado	Montezuma Fuller-designed, Romanesque
First United Presbyterian Church (Sterling, Colorado)		1919 built 1982 NRHP-listed	130 S. 4th St. 40°37′25″N 103°12′37″W	Sterling, Colorado	Classical Revival

== Connecticut ==
Church	Image	Dates	Location	City, State	Description
First Presbyterian Church of Stamford		1854 founded 1958 built	1101 Bedford Street; 41.0630°N 73.5385°W	Stamford, Connecticut	Known as Fish Church for the unique shape of its modernist architecture building.

== Delaware ==
Church	Image	Dates	Location	City, State	Description
Blackwater Presbyterian Church		1767 built 1976 NRHP-listed	Omar Road; 38°32′44″N 75°9′43″W	Clarksville, Delaware	Colonial
Cool Spring Presbyterian Church		1854 built 1982 NRHP-listed	West of Lewes on Road 247; 38°44′13″N 75°14′21″W	Lewes, Delaware	Greek Revival
Lewes Presbyterian Church		1832 built 1977 NRHP-listed	100 Kings Highway; 38°46′20″N 75°8′23″W	Lewes, Delaware	Colonial Revival, Greek Revival, Gothic Revival
Head of Christiana United Presbyterian Church		1708 founded 1859 built 1983 NRHP-listed	1100 Church Road; 39°41′31″N 75°47′12″W	Newark, Delaware	Greek Revival
Old First Presbyterian Church (Newark, Delaware)		founded 1868 built 1982 NRHP-listed	W. Main St. 39°40′57″N 75°45′25″W	Newark, Delaware	Dixon & Davis-designed, Gothic
Pencader Presbyterian Church		founded 1701 c. built 1852 NRHP-listed as part of Aiken's Tavern Historic District	Glasgow, Delaware		
White Clay Creek Presbyterian Church		1855 built 1973 NRHP-listed	39°41′55″N 75°42′41″W	Newark, Delaware	
Red Clay Creek Presbyterian Church		1853 built 1973 NRHP-listed	Mill Creek and McKennan's Church Rds. 39°45′7″N 75°40′20″W	Newport, Delaware	Greek Revival
Old Drawyers Church		1775 built 2002 NRHP-listed	U.S. Highway 13; 39°28′1″N 75°39′15″W	Odessa, Delaware	Colonial
St. Georges Presbyterian Church		1844 built 1984 NRHP-listed	Main St. 39°33′21″N 75°39′8″W	St. Georges, Delaware	Greek Revival, Italianate
Old First Presbyterian Church of Wilmington		1740 built 1972 NRHP-listed	West Street; 39°45′2″N 75°32′51″W	Wilmington, Delaware	Colonial

== District of Columbia ==
Church	Image	Dates	Location	City, State	Description
Church of the Pilgrims		1904 founded 1929 built	2201 P Street NW; 38°54′37.1″N 77°02′57.4″W	Washington, D.C.	formerly called Second Southern Presbyterian Church
National Presbyterian Church		1812 founded 1969 built	4101 Nebraska Ave NW; 37°56′31.3″N 77°04′53.4″W	Washington, D.C.	Designed by Harold E. Wagoner, dedicated by Dwight D. Eisenhower, third largest religious edifice in the city
New York Avenue Presbyterian Church		1860 founded 1951 built	1313 New York Ave NW; 38°54′00.1″N 77°01′51.5″W	Washington, D.C.	Home church to various Presidents due to proximity to the White House

== Florida ==
Church	Image	Dates	Location	City, State	Description
Coral Ridge Presbyterian Church		1960 founded, 1974 dedicated	5555 N Federal Hwy; 26°11′45.2″N 80°06′46.4″W	Fort Lauderdale, Florida	Founded by D. James Kennedy and now led by Rob Pacienza, building designed by Harold E. Wagoner, member of the Presbyterian Church in America, at 300 feet (91 m) the fifth tallest church in the United States
First Presbyterian Church (Boca Raton, Florida)				Boca Raton, Florida	
First Presbyterian Church (Lynn Haven, Florida)		1911 built	810 Georgia Avenue; 30.246037°N 85.65237°W	Lynn Haven, Florida	Carpenter Gothic
First Presbyterian Church (Miami, Florida)		1898 built		Miami, Florida	
First Presbyterian Church Archeological Site		2008 NRHP-listed		New Smyrna Beach, Florida	Among the "Archeological Resources of the 18th-Century Smyrnea Settlement of Dr. Andrew Turnbull MPS"
First Presbyterian Church (Pensacola, Florida)				Pensacola, Florida	
Old Philadelphia Presbyterian Church		1975 NRHP-listed	30°38′37″N 84°34′38″W	Quincy, Florida	
First Presbyterian Church (Tallahassee, Florida)		1832 founded 1835-38 built 1974 NRHP-listed	102 N. Adams St. 30°26′32″N 84°16′57″W	Tallahassee, Florida	Greek Revival with Gothic Revival elements

== Georgia ==
Church	Image	Dates	Location	City, State	Description
Central Presbyterian Church (Atlanta, Georgia)		1885 built 1986 NRHP-listed	201 Washington St. SW; 33°44′59″N 84°23′21″W	Atlanta, Georgia	Gothic, English Gothic
First Presbyterian Church of Atlanta		1848 founded 1916–19 built	1328 Peachtree Street; 33°47′27″N 84°23′10″W	Atlanta, Georgia	Gothic Revival
North Avenue Presbyterian Church		1900 built 1978 NRHP-listed	607 Peachtree Ave., NE; 33°46′16″N 84°23′4″W	Atlanta, Georgia	Romanesque
Peachtree Presbyterian Church		1919 founded 1960 built	1328 Peachtree Street; 33°50′49″N 84°22′58″W	Atlanta, Georgia	Colonial Revival
Rock Spring Presbyterian Church		1923 built 1990 NRHP-listed	1824 Piedmont Ave. NE. 33°48′17″N 84°22′5″W	Atlanta, Georgia	Tudor Revival
First Presbyterian Church (Augusta, Georgia)		1804 founded 1809–12 built 1847 remodeled 1997 NRHP-listed	642 Telfair Street; 33°28′13″N 81°57′54″W	Augusta, Georgia	Romanesque Revival
Bath Presbyterian Church and Cemetery		1814 built 2004 NRHP-listed	33°20′9″N 82°10′22″W	Blythe, Georgia	Rural antebellum church
First Presbyterian Church (Cartersville, Georgia)		1909 built 1991 NRHP-listed	183 W. Main St. 34°9′51″N 84°47′59″W	Cartersville, Georgia	Romanesque
First Presbyterian Church of Columbus		1800 founded 1862 built NRHP-listed	1100 1st Avenue; 32°28′0″N 84°59′30″W	Columbus, Georgia	Romanesque Revival
Sardis Presbyterian Church and Cemetery		1836 built 2005 NRHP-listed	34°15′55″N 85°22′41″W	Coosa, Georgia	
Flemington Presbyterian Church		1851 built 1982 NRHP-listed	Off Old Sunbury Rd.	Flemington, Georgia	Greek Revival
Greenville Presbyterian Church and Cemetery		1836 built 2002 NRHP-listed	33°3′56″N 84°42′19″W	Greenville, Georgia	
Bryan Neck Presbyterian Church		1885 built 2000 NRHP-listed	Belfast Keller Rd. 31°50′30″N 81°15′40″W	Keller, Georgia	Colonial Revival, Bungalow/craftsman
Lincolnton Presbyterian Church and Cemetery		1823 built 1982 NRHP-listed	N. Washington St. 33°47′25″N 82°28′50″W	Lincolnton, Georgia	
First Presbyterian Church (Macon, Georgia)		1858 built 1972 NRHP-listed	690 Mulberry St. 32°50′17″N 83°37′47″W	Macon, Georgia	Romanesque and, for Macon, quite tall
Midway Presbyterian Church and Cemetery		1905 built 1986 NRHP-listed	4635 Dallas Hwy./GA 120 SW; 33°56′37″N 84°41′15″W	Powder Springs, Georgia	
First Presbyterian Church (Valdosta, Georgia)		1910 built 1987 NRHP-listed	313 N. Patterson St. 30°50′3″N 83°16′10″W	Valdosta, Georgia	Classical Revival
Walthourville Presbyterian Church		1884 built 1987 NRHP-listed	Allenhurst Antioch Rd. 31°45′0″N 81°36′51″W	Walthourville, Georgia	Gothic
Washington Presbyterian Church		1890 built 1972 NRHP-listed	206 E. Robert Toombs Ave. 33°44′8″N 82°44′10″W	Washington, Georgia	New England Wren-Gibbs

== Idaho ==
Church	Image	Dates	Location	City, State	Description
Emmett Presbyterian Church		1909 built 1980 NRHP-listed	2nd St. 43°52′23″N 116°29′49″W	Emmett, Idaho	Late Gothic Revival
Hazelton Presbyterian Church		1916 built 1991 NRHP-listed	310 Park Ave. 42°35′42″N 114°8′5″W	Hazelton, Idaho	Gothic
First Presbyterian Church (Idaho Falls, Idaho)		1918 built 1978 NRHP-listed	325 Elm St. 43°29′22″N 112°2′6″W	Idaho Falls, Idaho	Classical Revival
First Presbyterian Church (Kamiah, Idaho)		1874 built 1976 NRHP-listed	46°12′16″N 116°0′20″W	Kamiah, Idaho	Greek Revival, Gothic Revival
First Presbyterian Church (Lapwai, Idaho)		1909 built 1980 NRHP-listed	Locust and 1st St., E. 46°24′13″N 116°48′9″W	Lapwai, Idaho	
United Presbyterian Church (Malad City, Idaho)		1882 built 1979 NRHP-listed	S. Main St. 42°11′10.0″N 112°14′36.5″W	Malad City, Idaho	
Nampa Presbyterian Church		1918 built 1982 NRHP-listed	2nd St. and 15th Ave., S. 43°34′34″N 116°33′25″W	Nampa, Idaho	Late Gothic Revival
Post Falls Community United Presbyterian Church		1890 built 1984 NRHP-listed	47°42′41″N 116°56′39″W	Post Falls, Idaho	Gothic Revival Vernacular

== Illinois ==
Church	Image	Dates	Location	City, State	Description
North Sangamon United Presbyterian Church		1860 built 1979 NRHP-listed	40°0′14″N 89°43′23″W	Athens, Illinois	Georgian
First Presbyterian Church (Champaign, Illinois)		1867 built	302 W Church St. 40.1189°N 88.2471°W	Champaign, Illinois	19th century German
First Presbyterian Church of Chicago		1833 founded 1927 built	6400 S. Kimbark Ave. 41°46′42.6″N 87°35′42″W	Chicago, Illinois	Gothic Revival
Edgewater Presbyterian Church		1896 founded 1927 built 2002 Bryn Mawr Historic District	1020 W. Bryn Mawr Ave.41°59′2.04″N 87°39′22.68″W	Chicago, Illinois	French Romanesque
Fourth Presbyterian Church of Chicago		1871 founded 1912–14 built 1975 NRHP-listed	126 East Chestnut Street; 41°53′55.5″N 87°37′29″W	Chicago, Illinois	Gothic Revival
Second Presbyterian Church of Chicago		1842 founded 1874 built 1974 NRHP-listed	1936 South Michigan Avenue; 41°51′21″N 87°37′28″W	Chicago, Illinois	Gothic Revival
Pioneer Gothic Church		1857 built 1983 NRHP-listed	201 North Franklin Street; 41°5′43″N 88°25′34″W	Dwight, Illinois	Carpenter Gothic
Memorial Washington Reformed Presbyterian Church		1844 built 1980 NRHP-listed	W. Highland Avenue; 42°3′51″N 88°23′28″W	Elgin, Illinois	Greek Revival
Cumberland Presbyterian Church (Peoria, Illinois)		1856 built 1980 NRHP-listed	405 North Monson Street; 40°41′33.3″N 89°35′46″W	Peoria, Illinois	Greek Revival
First Presbyterian Church (Vandalia, Illinois)		1868 built 1982 NRHP-listed	301 W. Main St. 38°58′5″N 89°6′7″W	Vandalia, Illinois	Gothic Revival

== Indiana ==
Church	Image	Dates	Location	City, State	Description
First Presbyterian Church (Aurora, Indiana)		founded 1855 built 1994 NRHP-listed	215 Fourth St. 39°3′15″N 84°53′52″W	Aurora, Indiana	Greek Revival
Hopewell Presbyterian Church		1902 built 2000 NRHP-listed	39°29′36″N 86°7′0″W	Franklin, Indiana	Gothic, Akron Plan
First Presbyterian Church (Hartford City, Indiana)		1893 built 1986 NRHP-listed	40°27′10″N 85°22′6″W	Hartford City, Indiana	Romanesque
First Presbyterian Church (Hays, Indiana)		founded built		Hays, Indiana	
Old Newburgh Presbyterian Church		1851 built 1978 NRHP-listed	N. State and W. Main Sts. 37°56′44″N 87°24′19″W	Newburgh, Indiana	
Oxford Presbyterian Church		1902 built 1984 NRHP-listed	NW of Benton and Justus Sts. 40°31′8″N 87°15′2″W	Oxford, Indiana	Romanesque Revival
Poland Presbyterian Church and Cemetery		1869 built 1990 NRHP-listed	IN 42 near Co. Rd. 56S; 39°26′41″N 86°57′14″W	Poland, Indiana	Gable-front; Gothic, Gothic Revival, other architecture
First Presbyterian Church (Portland, Indiana)		founded built		Portland, Indiana	
Putnamville Presbyterian Church		1834 built 1984 NRHP-listed	IN 243; 39°34′25″N 86°51′54″W	Putnamville, Indiana	Greek Revival
First Presbyterian Church (Seymour, Indiana)		1884 built 1991 NRHP-listed	301 N. Walnut St. 38°57′35″N 85°53′32″W	Seymour, Indiana	Late Gothic Revival
First Presbyterian Church (South Bend, Indiana)		1888 built 1985 NRHP-listed	101 S. Lafayette; 41°40′34″N 86°15′13″W	South Bend, Indiana	Romanesque. NRHP-listed as Former First Presbyterian Church

== Iowa ==
Church	Image	Dates	Location	City, State	Description
First Presbyterian Church (Davenport, Iowa)		1983 NRHP-listed	316 E. Kirkwood Boulevard; 41°32′11″N 90°34′12″W	Davenport, Iowa	Romanesque style
Old Brick Church (Iowa City, Iowa)		1856 built 1973 NRHP-listed	26 E. Market St. 41°39′50″N 91°32′4″W	Iowa City, Iowa	Romanesque former church, also known as North Presbyterian Church
First Presbyterian Church of Marion, Iowa		1842 founded 1885 built 1992 NRHP-listed	802 12th St. 42°2′3″N 91°35′40″W	Marion, Iowa	Gothic Revival
First Presbyterian Church (Muscatine, Iowa)		1858 built 1977 NRHP-listed	401 Iowa Ave. 41°25′22″N 91°2′51″W	Muscatine, Iowa	Gothic Revival
United Presbyterian Church, Summerset		1885 built 1976 NRHP-listed	U.S. Route 65; 41°28′16″N 93°33′38″W	Scotch Ridge, Iowa	Gothic Revival
Union Presbyterian Church (Stacyville, Iowa)		1888 built 1977 NRHP-listed	43°28′47″N 92°48′35″W	Stacyville, Iowa	
Red Oak Grove Presbyterian Church and Cemetery		1841 founded 2010 NRHP-listed	751 King Ave. 41°50′9.41″N 91°9′25.46″W	Tipton, Iowa	Classical Revival
First Presbyterian Church (West Bend, Iowa)		1889 built 2010 NRHP-listed	101 1st Ave. SW. 42°57′41″N 94°26′48″W	West Bend, Iowa	Late Victorian

== Kansas ==
Church	Image	Dates	Location	City, State	Description
First Presbyterian Church of Abilene		1882 built 2001 NRHP-listed	300 N. Mulberry St. 38°55′4″N 97°13′5″W	Abilene, Kansas	Late Gothic Revival, Romanesque
Vinland Presbyterian Church		1879 built 2003 NRHP-listed	38°50′25″N 95°10′53″W	Baldwin, Kansas	Gothic
First Presbyterian Church (Fort Scott, Kansas)		1925 built 2008 NRHP-listed	308 S. Crawford; 37°50′17″N 94°43′20″W	Fort Scott, Kansas	Late 19th and 20th Century Revivals, Late Gothic Revival
First Presbyterian Church (Gardner, Kansas)		1866 founded	138 E. Shawnee	Gardner, Kansas	
First Presbyterian Church (Girard, Kansas)		1888 built 2009 NRHP-listed	202 N. Summit; 37°30′51″N 94°50′36″W	Girard, Kansas	Romanesque
First Presbyterian Church (Hays, Kansas)		1879 built 1973 NRHP-listed	100 W. 7th St. 38°52′15″N 99°19′50″W	Hays, Kansas	Gothic
Highland Presbyterian Church		1914 built 2007 NRHP-listed	101 South Ave. 39°51′34″N 95°16′15″W	Highland, Kansas	Gothic
Iowa, Sac, and Fox Presbyterian Mission		1846 built 1970 NRHP-listed	39°51′51″N 95°13′45″W	Highland, Kansas	
United Presbyterian Center		1959 built 2009 NRHP-listed	1204 Oread Ave. 38°57′42″N 95°14′32″W	Lawrence, Kansas	Modern Movement
First Presbyterian Church, Leavenworth		1907 built 2006 NRHP-listed	407 Walnut St. 39°18′49″N 94°54′47″W	Leavenworth, Kansas	Classical Revival
Natoma Presbyterian Church		1898 built 2006 NRHP-listed	408 N. 3rd St. 39°11′23″N 99°1′16″W	Natoma, Kansas	Classical Revival
Stafford Reformed Presbyterian Church		1913 built 2005 NRHP-listed	113 N. Green Ave., 37°57′46″N 98°36′21″W	Stafford, Kansas	Gothic Revival
Westminster Presbyterian Church (Topeka, Kansas)		1926 built 2004 NRHP-listed	1275 Boswell Ave. 39°2′37″N 95°42′8″W	Topeka, Kansas	Late Gothic Revival

== Kentucky ==
Church	Image	Dates	Location	City, State	Description
Red River Presbyterian Meetinghouse Site and Cemetery		1800 built 1976 NRHP-listed	36°43′16″N 86°48′53″W	Adairville, Kentucky	
Carlisle Presbyterian Church		1842 founded NRHP listed 1989	38°18′9.6″N 84°1′20.4″W	Carlisle, Kentucky	
Presbyterian Manse (Anchorage, Kentucky)		1910 built 1983 NRHP-listed	38°15′51″N 85°32′42″W	Anchorage, Kentucky	
First Presbyterian Church (Ashland, Kentucky)		1858 built 1973 NRHP-listed	1600 Winchester Ave. 38°28′41″N 82°38′23″W	Ashland, Kentucky	Late Victorian
Mount Olivet Cumberland Presbyterian Church		1845 built 1979 NRHP-listed	SR 526; 37°3′5″N 86°22′48″W	Bowling Green, Kentucky	Greek Revival
Buckhorn Presbyterian Church and the Greer Gymnasium		1927 built 1975 NRHP-listed	Off KY 28; 37°20′53″N 83°28′32″W	Buckhorn, Kentucky	Scandinavian style
First Presbyterian Church (Danville, Kentucky)		1832 built 1986 NRHP-listed	W. Main between N. Fifth and N. Sixth Sts. 37°38′44″N 84°46′38″W	Danville, Kentucky	Gothic Revival
First Presbyterian Church (Elizabethtown, Kentucky)		1896 built 1988 NRHP-listed	212 W. Dixie Ave. 37°39′38″N 85°51′32″W	Elizabethtown, Kentucky	Romanesque
Elizaville Presbyterian Church		1861 built 1977 NRHP-listed	KY 32; 38°25′8″N 83°49′27″W	Elizaville, Kentucky	Greek Revival
First Presbyterian Church (Flemingsburg, Kentucky)		1819 built 1977 NRHP-listed	W. Main and W. Water Sts. 38°25′28″N 83°44′10″W	Flemingsburg, Kentucky	
Fredonia Cumberland Presbyterian Church		1892 built 1985 NRHP-listed	US 641; 37°12′36″N 88°3′30″W	Fredonia, Kentucky	Gothic
First Presbyterian Church (Glasgow, Kentucky)		1853 built 1983 NRHP-listed	Washington and Broadway; 36°59′39″N 85°54′40″W	Glasgow, Kentucky	Gothic Revival
Greensburg Cumberland Presbyterian Church		1876 built 1985 NRHP-listed	Hodgenville Ave. and N. 1st St. 37°15′45″N 85°30′8″W	Greensburg, Kentucky	Gothic Revival
Ebenezer Presbyterian Church		1803 built 1983 NRHP-listed	37°55′49″N 84°41′4″W	Keene, Kentucky	Federal
First Presbyterian Church (Lexington, Kentucky)		1872 built 1974 NRHP-listed	174 N. Mill St. 38°2′57″N 84°29′49″W	Lexington, Kentucky	Cincinnatus Shryock-designed, Gothic Revival
Second Presbyterian Church (Lexington, Kentucky)		1922 built 1980 NRHP-listed	460 E. Main St. 38°2′23″N 84°29′26″W	Lexington, Kentucky	Cram & Ferguson, Frankel & Curtis, Art Deco
Walnut Hill Presbyterian Church		1801 built 1973 NRHP-listed	37°58′7″N 84°25′29″W	Lexington, Kentucky	
College Street Presbyterian Church		1867 built 1978 NRHP-listed	113 W. College St. 38°14′36″N 85°45′18″W	Louisville, Kentucky	Greek Revival; may no longer be there
Old Presbyterian Theological Seminary		1906 built NRHP-listed		Louisville, Kentucky	
Munfordville Presbyterian Church and Green River Lodge No.88		1835 built 1980 NRHP-listed	3rd and Washington Sts. 37°16′17″N 85°53′32″W	Munfordville, Kentucky	
Pennsylvania Run Presbyterian Church		1983 NRHP-listed	38°7′37″N 85°37′46″W	Okolona, Kentucky	
Paint Lick Presbyterian Church		1879 built 1985 NRHP-listed	KY 52; 37°35′12″N 84°26′11″W	Paint Lick, Kentucky	Gothic Revival
New Providence Presbyterian Church		1862 built 1975 NRHP-listed	37°51′53″N 84°51′10″W	Salvisa, Kentucky	Greek Revival
Springfield Presbyterian Church (Sharpsburg, Kentucky)		1821 built 1979 NRHP-listed	38°8′56″N 83°54′13″W	Sharpsburg, Kentucky	Greek Revival
Smiths Grove Presbyterian Church		1900 built 1979 NRHP-listed	College and 2nd Sts. 37°3′13″N 86°12′26″W	Smiths Grove, Kentucky	Gothic Revival
Beechfork Presbyterian Church		1836 built 1989 NRHP-listed	37°45′14″N 85°10′30″W	Springfield, Kentucky	Romanesque, Gothic Revival
Pisgah Presbyterian Church (Versailles, Kentucky)		built 1983 NRHP-listed	Off U.S. Route 60; 38°3′14″N 84°39′17″W	Versailles, Kentucky	
Wooton Presbyterian Center		1919 built 1979 NRHP-listed	KY 80; 37°10′51″N 83°18′7″W	Wooton, Kentucky	Shingle Style

== Louisiana ==
Church	Image	Dates	Location	City, State	Description
Arcola Presbyterian Church		1859 built 1982 NRHP-listed	Church St. 30°46′34″N 90°31′4″W	Arcola, Louisiana	Greek Revival
Baker Presbyterian Church		1905 built 1990 NRHP-listed	3015 Groom Rd. 30°35′18″N 91°10′9″W	Baker, Louisiana	Greek Revival
Keachi Presbyterian Church		1858 built 1988 NRHP-listed	LA 5; 32°11′17″N 93°54′10″W	Keachi, Louisiana	Greek Revival
Atkinson Memorial Presbyterian Church		1916 built 1991 NRHP-listed	214 Fourth St. 29°41′34″N 91°12′4″W	Morgan City, Louisiana	Bungalow/Craftsman, Gothic Revival
First Presbyterian Church (Ruston, Louisiana)		1923 built 1984 NRHP-listed	212 N. Bonner St. 32°31′46″N 92°38′13″W	Ruston, Louisiana	Late Gothic Revival
First Presbyterian Church (Shreveport, Louisiana)		2011 NRHP-listed	900 Jordan St. 32°29′55″N 93°44′59″W	Shreveport, Louisiana	

== Maryland ==
Church	Image	Dates	Location	City, State	Description
First Presbyterian Church and Manse (Baltimore, Maryland)		1854 built 1973 NRHP-listed	200-210 W. Madison St. 39°17′56″N 76°37′8″W	Baltimore, Maryland	Gothic Revival
Franklin Street Presbyterian Church and Parsonage		1847 built 1971 NRHP-listed	100 W. Franklin St. 39°17′43″N 76°37′2″W	Baltimore, Maryland	Gothic Revival, Tudor Gothic Revival
Brown Memorial Presbyterian Church		1870 built	Park and Lafayette Avenues	Baltimore, Maryland	Gothic Revival
Westminster Presbyterian Church and Cemetery		1815 built 1974 NRHP-listed	509 West Fayette Street; 39°17′24″N 76°37′26″W	Baltimore, Maryland	Greek Revival, Exotic Revival, Gothic Revival
Fourth Presbyterian Church		1958 built	5500 River Road; 38.9691°N 77.1114°W	Bethesda, Maryland	Colonial revival
Churchville Presbyterian Church		1820 built 1986 NRHP-listed	Intersection of MD 22 and MD 136; 39°33′34″N 76°15′10″W	Churchville, Maryland	Italianate
First Presbyterian Church (Cumberland, Maryland)				Cumberland, Maryland	
Rock United Presbyterian Church		1761 built 1983 NRHP-listed	39°42′7″N 75°53′9″W	Elkton, Maryland	Gothic
Manokin Presbyterian Church		1765 built 1976 NRHP-listed	N. Somerset Ave. 38°12′27″N 75°41′43″W	Princess Anne, Maryland	
Rehobeth Presbyterian Church		c. 1706 built 1974 NRHP-listed	S of Rehobeth off MD 667; 38°2′21″N 75°39′53″W	Rehobeth, Maryland	
Makemie Memorial Presbyterian Church		1887 built 2008 NRHP-listed	103 W Market Street; 38°10′34″N 75°23′38″W	Snow Hill, Maryland	Gothic Revival
Springfield Presbyterian Church (Sykesville, Maryland)		1836 built 1986 NRHP-listed	7300 Spout Hill Rd. 39°22′27″N 76°58′24″W	Sykesville, Maryland	19th Century Classicism
First Presbyterian Church of Howard County		founded built			
First Presbyterian Church (Westminster, Maryland)		founded built		Westminster, Maryland	

== Massachusetts ==
Church	Image	Dates	Location	City, State	Description
First Presbyterian Society Meeting House		1828 built 2010 NRHP-listed	20 Main Street	Millbury, Massachusetts	Greek Revival
Roxbury Presbyterian Church		1891 built 1991 NRHP-listed	42°19′10″N 71°4′55″W	Boston, Massachusetts	Gothic, Queen Anne
Christ The King Presbyterian Church		1851 built 1982 NRHP-listed	99 Prospect Street; 42°22′4″N 71°6′12″W	Cambridge, Massachusetts	
First Presbyterian Church (Newburyport, Massachusetts)		1746 founded	29 Federal St. 42°48′31″N 70°51′58″W	Newburyport, Massachusetts	Also known as Old South, part of Presbyterian Church (USA).

== Michigan ==
Church	Image	Dates	Location	City, State	Description
First Presbyterian Church of Ann Arbor		1826 founded	1432 Washtenaw Ave.	Ann Arbor, Michigan	
First Presbyterian Church of Blissfield		1849 built 1971 NRHP-listed	306 Franklin Street; 41°50′8″N 83°50′50″W	Blissfield, Michigan	Greek Revival
Kirk in the Hills		1958 completed	1340 Long Lake Rd. 42°34′51″N 83°17′39″W	Bloomfield Hills, Michigan	Gothic
First Presbyterian Church (Cass City, Michigan)		1907 built 2006 NRHP-listed	6505 Church St. 43°36′8″N 83°10′28″W	Cass City, Michigan	
Sashabaw Presbyterian Church		1856 built 1980 NRHP-listed	42°43′9″N 83°21′44″W	Clarkston, Michigan	Greek Revival
First Presbyterian Church (Coldwater, Michigan)		1866 built 1986 NRHP-listed	52 Marshall St. 41°56′32″N 85°0′1″W	Coldwater, Michigan	Romanesque
First Presbyterian Church (Detroit, Michigan)		1889 built 1979 NRHP-listed	42°20′38.89″N 83°3′18.95″W	Detroit, Michigan	Richardsonian Romanesque
Fort Street Presbyterian Church		1876 built 1971 NRHP-listed	42°19′39″N 83°3′14″W	Detroit, Michigan	Gothic
Woodward Ave. Presbyterian Church		1908 built 1982 NRHP-listed	42°22′40.52″N 83°4′46″W	Detroit, Michigan	Late Gothic Revival
Highland Park Presbyterian Church		1910 built 1982 NRHP-listed	42°23′48″N 83°5′30″W	Highland Park, Michigan	
Franklin Avenue Presbyterian Church		1916 built 1988 NRHP-listed	108 W. Grand River Ave. 42°44′53″N 84°33′8″W	Lansing, Michigan	Prairie School, Arts and Crafts
Saline First Presbyterian Church		1898 built 1985 NRHP-listed	143 E. Michigan Ave. 42°10′2″N 83°46′50″W	Saline, Michigan	Romanesque Revival
First United Presbyterian Church		1832 founded 1984 NRHP-listed (old church); 2003 built	309 Lyon St. 46°29′41″N 84°20′47″W	Sault Ste. Marie, Michigan	Romanesque Revival
First Presbyterian Church (Wyandotte, Michigan)				Wyandotte, Michigan	
First Presbyterian Church (Mount Pleasant, Michigan)		1871 founded	1250 Watson Rd.	Mount Pleasant, Michigan	

== Minnesota ==
Church	Image	Dates	Location	City, State	Description
First Presbyterian Church (Hastings, Minnesota)		1876 built 1995 NRHP-listed	602 Vermillion St. 44°44′24.47″N 92°51′10.95″W	Hastings, Minnesota	Designed by Charles Daniels; Romanesque
First Presbyterian Church (Mankato, Minnesota)		1893 built 1980 NRHP-listed	Hickory and S. Broad Sts. 44°9′53″N 94°0′7″W	Mankato, Minnesota	Richardsonian Romanesque, designed by Warren H. Hayes
Stewart Memorial Presbyterian Church		1910 built 1978 NRHP-listed	116 East 32nd St. 44°56′43″N 93°16′32″W	Minneapolis, Minnesota	Rare Prairie School-style church, designed by Purcell & Feick
Westminster Presbyterian Church		founded 1857 built 1897; NRHP-listed	83 12th St. S. 44°58′17.91″N 93°16′32.03″W	Minneapolis, Minnesota	Designed by Warren Howard Hayes and Charles Sumner Sedgwick
Central Presbyterian Church (Saint Paul, Minnesota)		1888 built 1983 NRHP-listed	500 Cedar Street; 44°56′59″N 93°5′46″W	St. Paul, Minnesota	Designed by Warren H. Hayes in Richardsonian Romanesque style.
Union Presbyterian Church (St. Peter, Minnesota)		1869 founded 1871 built 1983 NRHP-listed	311 W. Locust St. 44°19′15″N 93°57′44″W	St. Peter, Minnesota	

== Mississippi ==
Church	Image	Dates	Location	City, State	Description
Bethel Presbyterian Church		1828 built 1978 NRHP-listed	31°54′21″N 91°7′44″W	Alcorn, Mississippi	Greek Revival
First Presbyterian Church (Hattiesburg, Mississippi)		1882 established 1978 built	31°19′28.7″N 89°21′42.7″W	Hattiesburg, MS	Gothic Revival
First Presbyterian Church (Jackson, Mississippi)		1837 established 1960 built	32.318°N 90.178°W	Jackson, MS	Romanesque
Rodney Presbyterian Church		1832 built 1973 NRHP-listed	31°51′49″N 91°12′21″W	Alcorn, Mississippi	
Bethany Presbyterian Church		1855 built 2003 NRHP-listed	31°6′7″N 90°59′11″W	Centreville, Mississippi	Greek Revival
Old First Presbyterian Church (Kosciusko, Mississippi)		1899 built 1992 NRHP-listed	Jct. of Huntington and Washington Sts. 33°3′31″N 89°35′15″W	Kosciusko, Mississippi	Romanesque
Liberty Presbyterian Church		1850 built 1985 NRHP-listed	North Church St. 31°9′31″N 90°48′33″W	Liberty, Mississippi	Greek Revival
Vernal Presbyterian Church		1906-08 built 2002 NRHP-listed	31°2′4″N 88°36′42″W	Lucedale, Mississippi	Gothic Revival
First Presbyterian Church of Meridian		1856 founded 1913 built 1979 NRHP-listed	23rd Avenue and 10th Street; 32°21′59″N 88°42′6″W	Meridian, Mississippi	Gothic Revival
Montrose Presbyterian Church		1910 built 2003 NRHP-listed	Cty Rd. 20; 32°7′24″N 89°14′12″W	Montrose, Mississippi	Gothic
Carmel Presbyterian Church		1855 built 1985 NRHP-listed	Carmel Church Road; 31°25′53″N 91°19′34″W	Natchez, Mississippi	Greek Revival
College Hill Presbyterian Church		built NRHP-listed		Oxford, Mississippi	Greek Revival
First Presbyterian Church of Natchez		1830 built 1978 NRHP-listed	117 S. Pearl St. 31°33′32″N 91°24′13″W	Natchez, Mississippi	Greek Revival, Federal
Hopewell Presbyterian Church (Oxford, Mississippi)		1849 built 1999 NRHP-listed	34°23′37″N 89°24′41″W	Oxford, Mississippi	Mid 19th Century Revival
Union Church Presbyterian Church		1852 built 1979 NRHP-listed	MS 550; 31°40′58″N 90°47′26″W	Union Church, Mississippi	
Lebanon Presbyterian Church		1836 built 1999 NRHP-listed	32°8′55″N 90°31′22″W	Utica, Mississippi	Mid 19th Century Revival
Yokena Presbyterian Church		1885 built 1984 NRHP-listed	32°10′24″N 90°56′31″W	Vicksburg, Mississippi	Stick/Eastlake
Sand Spring Presbyterian Church		1854 built 1993 NRHP-listed	34°15′24″N 89°42′55″W	Water Valley, Mississippi	Vernacular rural church

== Missouri ==
Church	Image	Dates	Location	City, State	Description
Presbyterian Orphanage of Missouri		2006 NRHP-listed	412 W. Liberty St. 37°47′0″N 90°25′39″W	Farmington, Missouri	Classical Revival
Des Peres Presbyterian Church		1834 built 1978 NRHP-listed	Geyer Rd. 38°37′22″N 90°25′12″W	Frontenac, Missouri	
Glasgow Presbyterian Church		1860 built 1982 NRHP-listed	Commerce and 4th Sts. 39°13′36″N 92°50′36″W	Glasgow, Missouri	Gothic Revival
Green City Presbyterian Church		1918 built 2000 NRHP-listed	One East St. 40°16′7″N 92°57′10″W	Green City, Missouri	Classical Revival
First Presbyterian Church (Keytesville, Missouri)		1853 built 1977 NRHP-listed	Hill and East Sts. 39°26′9″N 92°56′13″W	Keytesville, Missouri	Classic Revival
First Presbyterian Church (La Grange, Missouri)		2012 NRHP-listed	401 Jefferson; 40°02′38″N 91°30′12″W	La Grange, Missouri	Part of the Rural Church Architecture of Missouri, c. 1819 to c. 1945 MPS
Cumberland Presbyterian Church (Lexington, Missouri)		1846 built 1978 NRHP-listed	112 S. 13th St. 39°11′6″N 93°52′45″W	Lexington, Missouri	Greek Revival
First Presbyterian Church (Marshall, Missouri)		1871 built 1977 NRHP-listed	212 E. North St. 39°7′15″N 93°11′39″W	Marshall, Missouri	Gothic Revival, Early Gothic Revival
New Lebanon Cumberland Presbyterian Church and School		1859 built 1979 NRHP-listed	MO A 38°45′53″N 92°56′20″W	New Lebanon, Missouri	Greek Revival
Second Presbyterian Church (St. Louis, Missouri)		1896 built 1975 NRHP-listed	4501 Westminster Pl. 38°38′51″N 90°15′20″W	St. Louis, Missouri	Richardsonian Romanesque

== Montana ==
Church	Image	Dates	Location	City, State	Description
First Presbyterian Church of Billings		founded built		Billings, Montana	
First Presbyterian Church (Bozeman, Montana)		1908 built 1987 NRHP-listed	26 W. Babcock; 45°40′41″N 111°2′16″W	Bozeman, Montana	Late Gothic Revival
First Presbyterian Church and Manse (Forsyth, Montana)		1910 built 1990 NRHP-listed	1160-1180 Cedar St. 46°16′3″N 106°40′32″W	Forsyth, Montana	Prairie School
First Presbyterian Church (Lewistown, Montana)		1912 built 1986 NRHP-listed	215 Fifth Ave. S 47°3′45″N 109°25′30″W	Lewistown, Montana	
First Presbyterian Church of Whitefish		1921 built 2004 NRHP-listed	301 Central Ave. 48°24′33″N 114°20′8″W	Whitefish, Montana	Romanesque

== Nebraska ==
Church	Image	Dates	Location	City, State	Description
First United Presbyterian Church of Auburn		1906 built 1982 NRHP-listed	1322 19th St. 40°23′8″N 95°50′37″W	Auburn, Nebraska	Late Gothic Revival
Presbyterian Church (Bellevue, Nebraska)		c.1856-58 built 1970 NRHP-listed	2002 Franklin St. 41°8′22″N 95°53′37″W	Presbyterian Church (Bellevue, Nebraska)	Greek Revival, Italianate
Zion Presbyterian Church (Clarkson, Nebraska)		1887-88 built 1988 NRHP-listed	41°41′4″N 97°3′33″W	Clarkson, Nebraska	
First Presbyterian Church (Grand Island, Nebraska)		founded built		Grand Island, Nebraska	
First Presbyterian Church (Madison, Nebraska)		1914 built 2008 NRHP-listed	104 E. 4th St. 41°49′38″N 97°27′14″W	Madison, Nebraska	Romanesque
North Presbyterian Church (Omaha, Nebraska)		1910 built 1986 NRHP-listed	41°17′13.7″N 95°56′47.98″W	Omaha, Nebraska	F.A. Henninger-designed in Classical Revival style
First Presbyterian Church (Spalding, Nebraska)		1904 built 2004 NRHP-listed	260 S. Pine St. 41°41′13″N 98°21′31″W	Spalding, Nebraska	Tudor Revival

== Nevada ==
Church	Image	Dates	Location	City, State	Description
First Presbyterian Church (Virginia City, Nevada)		1867 built 1966 NRHP CP-listed		Virginia City, Nevada	Contributing building in Virginia City Historic District

== New Hampshire ==
Church	Image	Dates	Location	City, State	Description
Bedford Presbyterian Church		1832 built 2007 NRHP-listed	4 Church Road; 42°56′42″N 71°31′12″W	Bedford, New Hampshire	Federal, Colonial Revival

== New Jersey ==
Church	Image	Dates	Location	City, State	Description
Burial Ground of the Presbyterian Church in the West Fields of Elizabethtown				Westfield, New Jersey	
Caldwell Presbyterian Church Manse		1832 built 1977 NRHP-listed	207 Bloomfield Avenue; 40°50′13″N 74°16′19″W	Caldwell, New Jersey	Notable as the birthplace of U.S. president Grover Cleveland
Central Presbyterian Church (Montclair, New Jersey)		1921 built 1986 NRHP-listed	46 Park St. 40°49′04″N 74°13′4″W	Montclair, New Jersey	Carrere & Hastings-designed; Colonial Revival, Georgian Revival
Cold Spring Presbyterian Church		1823 built 1991 NRHP-listed	38°58′35″N 74°54′59″W	Lower Township, New Jersey	Federal
Connecticut Farms Presbyterian Church			Stuyvesant Avenue at Chestnut St. 40°41′36″N 74°16′26″W	Union, New Jersey	
Cranbury First Presbyterian Church	First Presbyterian Cranbury	1740 built 1980 NRHP-listed	22 South Main Street	Cranbury, New Jersey	Colonial Revival
Deerfield Presbyterian Church		1771 built 1980 NRHP-listed	39°30′42″N 75°14′17″W	Seabrook, New Jersey	Colonial
Fairfield Presbyterian Church		1680 founded 1780 built 1977 NRHP-listed	53 Main Street Church Lane. 39°22′53″N 75°13′16″W	Fairton, New Jersey	Greek Revival, oldest congregation in the Presbyterian Church in America
First Congregation of the Presbyterian Church at Springfield		1745 built 1990 NRHP-listed	40°42′40″N 74°18′36″W	Springfield, New Jersey	Federal, Greek Revival, Gothic Revival
First Memorial Presbyterian Church (Dover, New Jersey)		1901 built 1982 NRHP-listed	51 West Blackwell Street; 40°53′3″N 74°33′40″W	Dover, New Jersey	Romanesque Revival, part of Blackwell Street Historic District
First Presbyterian Church of Elizabeth		1783 built 1977 NRHP-listed	14-44 Broad St. 40°39′45″N 74°12′56″W	Elizabeth, New Jersey	Gothic Revival
First Presbyterian Church of Hanover		1835 built 1977 NRHP-listed	40°48′13″N 74°22′07″W	East Hanover, Livingston, New Jersey	Greek Revival, Gothic Revival
First Presbyterian Church (Matawan, New Jersey)				Matawan, New Jersey	
First Presbyterian Church (Morristown, New Jersey)		1756 (charter); 1894 (new structure)	57 E. Park Place; 40°47′51″N 74°28′49″W	Morristown, New Jersey	Romanesque Revival, part of Morristown District
South Street Presbyterian Church (Morristown, New Jersey)		1878 (new structure)	65 South Street; 40°47′40″N 74°28′46″W	Morristown, New Jersey	Romanesque Revival, part of Morristown District
First Presbyterian Church (Mount Holly, New Jersey)		1839 founded, 1887 built	125 Garden Street, 39°59′49″N 74°47′06″W	Mount Holly, New Jersey	Gothic revival, part of Mount Holly Historic District, member of ECO: A Covenant Order of Evangelical Presbyterians
First Presbyterian Church (New Brunswick, New Jersey)		1726 (or before) founded		New Brunswick, New Jersey	Photo from vintage postcard. Church burned down in 1947, replaced 1951
First Presbyterian Church (Pennington, New Jersey)		1709 founded, 1875 dedicated	13 South Main Street; 40°19′39″N 74°47′26″W	Pennington, New Jersey	NRHP listed
First Presbyterian Church (Rockaway, New Jersey)		1758 founded 1832 built	35 Church Street; 40°54′11.6″N 74°30′47.3″W	Rockaway, New Jersey	Gothic Revival
First Presbyterian Church of Rumson		1885 built 2009 NRHP-listed	4 E. River Rd. 40°22′34″N 74°00′35″W	Rumson, New Jersey	Shingle Style; also known as First Presbyterian Church of Oceanic
First Presbyterian Church (Trenton, New Jersey)		1839 built 2005 NRHP-listed	120 East State St. 40°13′22″N 74°45′49″W	Trenton, New Jersey	Greek Revival
First Presbyterian Church of Wantage		1829 built 1982 NRHP-listed	41°14′28″N 74°37′22″W	Sussex, New Jersey	
First Presbyterian Church and Cemetery		2008 NRHP-listed	600 Rahway Ave.	Woodbridge, New Jersey	Greek Revival, Classical Revival
Highlands Presbyterian Church (Schooley's Mountain, New Jersey)		1870 built 1991 NRHP-listed	3 Heath Lane; 40°47′58″N 74°48′59″W	Schooley's Mountain, New Jersey	
Mays Landing Presbyterian Church		1841 built 1982 NRHP-listed	Main Street and Cape May Avenue; 39°27′09″N 74°43′40″W	Mays Landing, New Jersey	Vernacular Neo-Classical
Mount Freedom Presbyterian Church		1868 built 1991 NRHP-listed	Jct. of Sussex Tpk. and Church Rd., Randolph Township; 40°49′38″N 74°34′56″W	Mount Freedom, New Jersey	Mid 19th Century Revival, East Jersey cottage
Nassau Presbyterian Church		1766 founded 1836 dedicated	61 Nassau Street; 40°20′56″N 74°39′38″W	Princeton, New Jersey	Greek Revival, church of John Witherspoon, Charles Hodge, John Gresham Machen among others
Old Broad Street Presbyterian Church and Cemetery		1792 built 1974 NRHP-listed	Broad and Lawrence Sts. 39°25′45″N 75°14′03″W	Bridgeton, New Jersey	Federal
Old First Presbyterian Church (Newark, New Jersey)		1972 NRHP-listed	820 Broad St. 40°44′03″N 74°10′21″W	Newark, New Jersey	Colonial, Georgian; also known as First Presbyterian Church and Cemetery
Pittsgrove Presbyterian Church		1767 built 1977 NRHP-listed	Main Street; 39°36′4″N 75°15′38″W	Daretown, New Jersey	Romanesque, Italian Romanesque
Presbyterian Church at Bound Brook		1896 built 2007 NRHP-listed	409 Mountain Ave. 40°34′01″N 74°31′52″W	Bound Brook, New Jersey	Late 19th century Eclecticism
Presbyterian Church in Basking Ridge		1839 built 1974 NRHP-listed	6 E. Oak St. 40°42′26″N 74°32′39″W	Basking Ridge, New Jersey	Greek Revival
Presbyterian Church of Norwood		1868 built 2005 NRHP-listed	701 Broadway; 40°59′54″N 73°57′39″W	Norwood Borough, New Jersey	Stick/Eastlake
Providence Presbyterian Church of Bustleton		1863 built 1988 NRHP-listed	40°05′16″N 74°47′02″W	Roebling, New Jersey	Late Victorian, Gothic, Carpenter Gothic
South Park Calvary United Presbyterian Church		1853 built 1972 NRHP-listed	1035 Broad St. 40°43′34″N 74°10′31″W	Newark, New Jersey	Greek Revival
Wickcliffe Presbyterian Church		1889 built 1978 NRHP-listed	111 13th Ave. 40°44′19″N 74°11′05″W	Newark, New Jersey	William Halsey Wood-designed, in Richardsonian Romanesque style

== New Mexico ==
Church	Image	Dates	Location	City, State	Description
Second United Presbyterian Church		1922 built 1984 NRHP-listed	812 Edith Blvd., NE; 35°5′26″N 106°38′21″W	Albuquerque, New Mexico	Mission/Spanish Revival
Presbyterian Mission Church		1871 built 1978 NRHP-listed	1413 Chavez St. 35°35′22″N 105°13′34″W	Las Vegas, New Mexico	

== New York ==
Church	Image	Dates	Location	City, State	Description
Presbyterian Church of Atlanta		1895 built 2010 NRHP-listed	2 Main Street; 42°33′13.79″N 77°28′23.33″W	Atlanta, New York	Queen Anne, Gothic Revival
First Presbyterian Church (Batavia, New York)		1854 built 2004 NRHP-listed	East Main and Liberty Streets; 42°59′47″N 78°10′44″W	Batavia, New York	Gothic Revival
Bedford Presbyterian Church (New York)		1872 built 1973 NRHP-listed	44 Village Green; 41.2032°N 73.6425°W	Bedford Village Historic District	Gothic Revival
First Presbyterian Church (Schenectady, New York)		1809 built 2000 NRHP-listed	115 Union Street; 42°49′02.6″N 73°56′41.2″W	Schenectady, New York	New England style, member of the Presbyterian Church in America
Batchellerville Presbyterian Church		1867 built 2000 NRHP-listed	Co. Rt. 7; 43°12′33″N 74°3′21″W	Batchellerville, New York	Greek Revival
Central Presbyterian Church (New York City)		1821 founded 1922 built	593 Park Avenue; 40°45′56.5″N 73°58′01.9″W	New York, New York	Gothic Revival, current building built as Park Avenue Baptist Church by John D. Rockefeller Jr., member of the Evangelical Presbyterian Church (United States)
First Presbyterian Church (Brockport, New York)		1852 built 1999 NRHP-listed	35 State St. 43°12′52″N 77°56′14″W	Brockport, New York	Greek Revival
Setauket Presbyterian Church and Burial Ground		1812 built 1996 NRHP-listed	5 Caroline Ave. 40°56′45″N 73°6′41″W	Brookhaven, New York	Federal
Cuyler Presbyterian Church		1892 built 2001 NRHP-listed	358-360 Pacific St. 40°41′12″N 73°59′11.3″W	Brooklyn, New York	Edward Sargent-designed, Greek Revival
First Presbyterian Church (Buffalo, New York)		1812 founded 1891 built		Buffalo, New York	
Lafayette Avenue Presbyterian Church		1894 built 2009 NRHP-listed	875 Elmwood Avenue; 42°55′15.31″N 78°52′37.17″W	Buffalo, New York	Romanesque Revival
First Presbyterian Church of Chester		1854 built 1998 NRHP-listed	106-108 Main St. 41°21′25″N 74°16′39″W	Chester, New York	Greek Revival, built for $10,000
Cochecton Presbyterian Church		1903 built 1992 NRHP-listed	Co. Rd. 114, E of Delaware R. Bridge; 41°42′25″N 75°3′52″W	Cochecton, New York	Late 19th and Early 20th Century American Movements, Akron Plan
Silliman Memorial Presbyterian Church		1897 built 1979 NRHP-listed	Mohawk and Seneca Sts. 42°46′28″N 73°42′2″W	Cohoes, New York	Fuller & Wheeler-designed, Romanesque, Richardsonian Romanesque
Canterbury Presbyterian Church		1826 built 1996 NRHP-listed	41°26′7″N 74°1′53″W	Cornwall, New York	Federal style
First Presbyterian Church Complex (Cortland, New York)		1889 built 2002 NRHP-listed	23 Church St. 42°35′57″N 76°10′41″W	Cortland, New York	Late Victorian, Late 19th and 20th Century Revivals
Hopewell Presbyterian Church		1831 built 1998 NRHP-listed	NY 302, at jct. of NY 17; 41°34′14″N 74°20′8″W	Crawford, New York	Gothic Revival
First Presbyterian Church (Delhi, New York)		1882 built 2006 NRHP-listed	Clinton St. 42°16′28″N 74°55′21″W	Delhi, New York	Late Victorian
South Presbyterian Church		1868-69 built 2000 NRHP-listed	41°0′55″N 73°52′10″W	Dobbs Ferry, New York	Gothic Revival
Reformed Presbyterian Church Parsonage		c.1829 built 1984 NRHP-listed	Duanesburg Churches Rd. 42°46′16″N 74°9′26″W	Duanesburg, New York	Federal, Vernacular Federal
First Presbyterian Church (Dundee, New York)		1895 built 2004 NRHP-listed	31 Main St. 42°31′28″N 76°58′37″W	Dundee, New York	Romanesque
First Presbyterian Church of Avon		1866 built 2005 NRHP-listed	5605 Avon-Lima Rd. 42°54′35″N 77°42′24″W	East Avon, New York	Federal, Gothic Revival
East Palmyra Presbyterian Church		1868-69 built 2002 NRHP-listed	2102 Whitbeck Rd. 43°5′2″N 77°8′52″W	East Palmyra, New York	Romanesque
St. Paul's German Presbyterian Church and Cemetery		1904 built 2008 NRHP-listed	525 Elmont Rd. 40°41′52″N 73°42′54″W	Elmont, New York	Gothic
First Presbyterian Church of Far Rockaway		1908 built 1986 NRHP-listed	1324 Beach Twelfth St. 40°36′34″N 73°44′51″W	Far Rockaway, New York	Late Gothic Revival style church designed by Ralph Adams Cram, known also as Russell Sage Memorial Church. Grounds designed by Olmsted Brothers.
Camroden Presbyterian Church		2007 NRHP-listed	43°15′12″N 75°16′55″W	Floyd, New York	Greek Revival
First Presbyterian Church (Glens Falls, New York)		1927 built 1984 NRHP-listed	402-410 Glen St. 43°18′44″N 73°38′21″W	Glens Falls, New York	Designed by Cram & Ferguson in Late Gothic Revival
Greenville Presbyterian Church Complex		1860 built 1985 NRHP-listed	North St., NY 32; 42°24′58″N 74°01′23″W	Greenville, New York	
Sparta First Presbyterian Church		1915 built 2007 NRHP-listed	4687 Scottsburg Rd. 42°39′53″N 77°45′59″W	Groveland Station, New York	Late Gothic Revival; it has a crenelated tower.
Hamilton Union Presbyterian Church		1886 built 1982 NRHP-listed	2291 Western Tpk. 42°42′14″N 73°54′32″W	Guilderland, New York	Stick/Eastlake
Guildford Center Presbyterian Church		1817 built 2004 NRHP-listed	Cty Rd. 36; 42°24′23″N 75°27′53″W	Guilford Center, New York	Greek Revival
First Presbyterian Church of Hector		1818 built 2001 NRHP-listed	5519 NY 414; 42°30′1″N 76°52′23″W	Hector, New York	Federal
First Presbyterian Church of Highland Falls		1868 built 1982 NRHP-listed	41°22′17″N 73°57′54″W	Highland Falls, New York	Now is United Methodist Church of the Highlands. Frederick Clarke Withers-designed in Romanesque Revival
German Presbyterian Church and Hortonville Cemetery		1860 built 2003 NRHP-listed	CR 121 and CR 131; 41°46′21″N 75°1′42″W	Hortonville, New York	
Sweet Hollow Presbyterian Church Parsonage		1830 built 1985 NRHP-listed	152 Old Country Rd. 40°47′33″N 73°25′5″W	Huntington, New York	
First Presbyterian Church in Jamaica		1662 founded		Jamaica, Queens, New York	Organized in 1662, it is the oldest continuously serving Presbyterian church in the United States.
Jewett Presbyterian Church Complex		1848 built 2001 NRHP-listed	Church St. 42°16′12″N 74°18′15″W	Jewett, New York	Greek Revival
First Presbyterian Church of Le Roy		1826 built 2014 NRHP-listed	7 Clay St. 42°58′38.3″N 77°59′31.6″W	Le Roy, New York	
Lima Presbyterian Church		1987 CP NRHP-listed	42°54′19″N 77°36′44″W	Lima, New York	Included in the Lima Village Historic District
United Presbyterian Church (Lisbon, New York)		1857 built 2005 NRHP-listed	26 Church St. 44°43′47″N 75°19′17″W	Lisbon, New York	H.J. Horwood-designed
Lordville Presbyterian Church		1896 built 2000 NRHP-listed	Lordville Rd. 41°52′11″N 75°12′57″W	Lordville, New York	Late Victorian
Lowville Presbyterian Church		1831 built 2007 NRHP-listed	7707 North State St. 43°47′28″N 75°29′47″W	Lowville, New York	Federal
Forest Presbyterian Church		1894 built 2004 NRHP-listed	4109 Center St. 43°37′5″N 75°21′41″W	Lyons Falls, New York	Shingle Style with Gothic elements
First Presbyterian Church of Marcellus		1801 founded 1851 built	East Main and North Streets; 42°58′58″N 76°20′23″W	Marcellus, New York	
First Presbyterian Church of Margaretville		1894 built 2004 NRHP-listed	42°8′57″N 74°39′6″W	Margaretville, New York	Late Victorian
Presbyterian Church of McGraw		1901 built 1986 NRHP-listed	3 W. Main St. 42°35′44″N 76°5′45″W	McGraw, New York	Eclectic Queen Anne
Mendon Presbyterian Church		2005 NRHP-listed	3886 Rush-Mendon Rd. 43°0′0″N 77°30′25″W	Mendon, New York	Gothic
Middle Island Presbyterian Church		1837 built 2005 NRHP-listed	271 Middle Country Road; 40°52′49″N 72°57′48″W	Middle Island, New York	Federal
Monsey Church		1824 founded	41.112168°N 74.069232°W	Monsey, New York	Greek Revival with elements of Italianate, joined the Presbyterian Church in America from the Christian Reformed Church in 2005
First Presbyterian Church of Mumford		1883 built 2002 NRHP-listed	George and William Sts. 42°59′32″N 77°51′44″W	Mumford, New York	Andrew Jackson Warner-designed, Gothic
New Kingston Presbyterian Church		1900 built 2002 NRHP-listed	CR 6; 42°12′48″N 74°40′57″W	New Kingston, New York	Late Victorian
First Presbyterian Church and Lewis Pintard House		1710 built 1979 NRHP-listed	Pintard Ave. 40°54′16″N 73°47′7″W	New Rochelle, New York	John Russell Pope-designed, Colonial Revival
Fifth Avenue Presbyterian Church		1808 founded 1875 built	Fifth Avenue at 55th Street; 40°45′43″N 73°58′30″W	New York City	Gothic Revival
First Presbyterian Church of Manhattan		1716 founded 1844–46 built	48 Fifth Avenue; 40°44′4″N 73°59′42″W	New York City	Gothic Revival
Fort Washington Presbyterian Church		1913 built 2010 NRHP-listed	21 Wadsworth Ave. 40°50′43.35″N 73°56′16.24″W	New York, New York	Georgian Revival
New York Presbyterian Church		1884 built 1982 NRHP-listed	151 W. 128th St. 40°48′39″N 73°56′49″W	New York, New York	Served until 1918 as a Presbyterian church, then acquired by a Baptist church. Gothic, Romanesque
Redeemer Presbyterian Church		1989 founded	Multiple locations 40.75190°N 73.98798°W	New York, New York	
Riverdale Presbyterian Church Complex		1863 built 1982 NRHP-listed	4761-4765 Henry Hudson Parkway; 40°53′45″N 73°54′32″W	New York, New York	James Renwick Jr. and Dwight J. Baum-designed; Late Gothic Revival, Stick/Eastlake
First Presbyterian Church of Ontario Center		1914 built 1998 NRHP-listed	1638 Ridge Rd. 43°13′31″N 77°18′6″W	Ontario Center, New York	Tudor Revival
First Presbyterian Church of Oyster Bay		1873 built 1976 NRHP-listed	40°52′18.25″N 73°31′45.35″W	Oyster Bay, New York	J. Cleveland Cady-designed in Stick/Eastlake style
Peekskill Presbyterian Church		1846 built 2002 NRHP-listed	41°17′19″N 73°55′27″W	Peekskill, New York	Greek Revival
Brick Presbyterian Church		1909 built 2007 NRHP-listed	6 Church Street; 42°43′14.9982″N 78°0′4.7412″W	Perry, New York	Gothic Revival
Smithfield Presbyterian Church		1820 built 1994 NRHP-listed	Pleasant Valley Rd. between Elizabeth and Park Sts. 42°57′56″N 75°41′17″W	Peterboro, New York	Italianate, Federal
Childwold Memorial Presbyterian Church		1903 built 2001 NRHP-listed	Bancroft Rd. 44°17′5″N 74°40′9″W	Piercefield, New York	Queen Anne
First Presbyterian Church (Plattsburgh, New York)		1868 built 1982 NRHP-listed	34 Brinkerhoff St. 44°41′50″N 73°27′16″W	Plattsburgh, New York	Gothic
Mount Moriah Presbyterian Church		1888 built 1995 NRHP-listed	Jct. of Church and S. Main Sts., NW corner, Town of Moriah; 44°2′53″N 73°27′39″W	Port Henry, New York	Romanesque
First Presbyterian Church of Dailey Ridge		1853 built 2002 NRHP-listed	411 Elliot Rd. 44°44′48″N 75°3′48″W	Potsdam, New York	Greek Revival
First Presbyterian Church (Poughkeepsie, New York)		1905 built 1982 NRHP-listed	25 S. Hamilton St. 41°42′4″N 73°55′29″W	Poughkeepsie, New York	Romanesque
First Presbyterian Church Rectory (Poughkeepsie, New York)		c.1857 built 1982 NRHP-listed	98 Cannon St. 41°42′4″N 73°55′31″W	Poughkeepsie, New York	Second Empire
First Presbyterian Church (Preble, New York)		1831 built 2002 NRHP-listed	Courtland Cty Rd. 108B; 42°44′6″N 76°8′47″W	Preble, New York	Federal, Colonial Revival
Brick Presbyterian Church Complex		1860 built 1992 NRHP-listed	121 N. Fitzhugh St. 43°9′27″N 77°37′1″W	Rochester, New York	Colonial Revival, Early Romanesque Revival
Emmanuel Presbyterian Church		1915 built 2001 NRHP-listed	Jefferson Ave. at 9 Shelter St. 43°8′19″N 77°37′47″W	Rochester, New York	Late 19th and Early 20th Century American Movements
First Presbyterian Church (Rochester, New York)		1871 built 1973 NRHP-listed	101 S. Plymouth Ave. 43°9′10″N 77°36′56″W	Rochester, New York	Gothic, designed by Andrew J. Warner
Roscoe Presbyterian Church and Westfield Flats Cemetery		c.1884 built 2001 NRHP-listed	Old NY 17; 41°55′56″N 74°54′47″W	Roscoe, New York	Late Victorian
Old Whaler's Church (First Presbyterian Church of Sag Harbor)		1766 founded 1844 built 1994 NHL-designated	44 Union Street; 40°59′50″N 72°17′38.66″W	Sag Harbor, New York	Minard Lafever-designed in Egyptian Revival style, with Greek Revival elements
Union Presbyterian Church (Scottsville, New York)		2004 NRHP-listed	Church St. 43°1′18″N 77°45′7″W	Scottsville, New York	Exotic Revival; also known as First Presbyterian Church of Wheatland
First Presbyterian Church (Smithtown, New York)		1825 built 1977 NRHP-listed	175 E. Main St. 40°51′24″N 73°11′18″W	Smithtown, New York	
First Presbyterian Church (Spencer, New York)		1915 built 2005 NRHP-listed	75-77 N. Main St. 42°12′50″N 76°29′33″W	Spencer, New York	Gothic Revival
St. Peter's Presbyterian Church and Spencertown Cemetery		1771 built 2002 NRHP-listed	42°19′23″N 73°32′46″W	Spencertown, New York	Federal
Seneca Presbyterian Church		1838 built 1973 NRHP-listed	42°48′20″N 77°3′5″W	Stanley, New York	
Calvary Presbyterian Church (Staten Island, New York)		1894 built 2002 NRHP-listed	909 Castleton Ave. 40°38′6″N 74°6′46″W	Staten Island, New York	Romanesque, Tudor Revival
First Presbyterian Church of Ulysses		built NRHP-listed	Main St. 42°32′29″N 76°39′34″W	Trumansburg, New York	Greek Revival
First Presbyterian Church of Tuscarora		2004 NRHP-listed	8082 Main St. 42°38′3″N 77°52′12″W	Tuscarora, New York	Greek Revival
First Presbyterian Church (Utica, New York)		1920 built 1988 NRHP-listed	43°5′29″N 75°15′1″W	Utica, New York	Ralph Adams Cram-designed
First Presbyterian Church (Valatie, New York)		1878 built 1979 NRHP-listed	Church St. 42°24′55″N 73°40′36″W	Valatie, New York	Gothic
Wanakena Presbyterian Church		1903 built 2007 NRHP-listed	32 Second St. 44°8′9″N 74°55′18″W	Wanakena, New York	Late Victorian
First Presbyterian Church (Waterloo, New York)		1850 built 1996 NRHP-listed	E. Main St., E of jct. with NY 96; 42°54′14″N 76°51′39″W	Waterloo, New York	Romanesque
West Charlton United Presbyterian Church		c.1880 built 1998 NRHP-listed	1331 Sacandaga Rd. 42°58′22″N 74°1′50″W	West Charlton, New York	Late Victorian
West Delhi Presbyterian Church, Manse, and Cemetery		1892 built 2008 NRHP-listed	18 and 45 Sutherland Rd. 42°18′0.41″N 75°0′25.29″W	West Delhi, New York	Late Victorian
West Kortright Presbyterian Church		1850 built 2002 NRHP-listed	49 W. Kortright Church Rd. 42°24′8″N 74°51′8″W	West Kortright, New York	Late Victorian
First Congregational and Presbyterian Society Church of Westport		1837 built 1988 NRHP-listed	Main St./CR 10; 44°13′50″N 73°27′33″W	Westport, New York	Federal
Centre Presbyterian Church		1835 built 1979 NRHP-listed	Main and Church Sts; 42°18′24″N 74°15′9″W	Windham, New York	Greek Revival, Federal
First Presbyterian Church (Wolcott, New York)		1883 built	W. Main St. 43°13′12″N 76°48′58″W	Wolcott, New York	Romanesque Revival; polychrome masonry; one of three contributing buildings in Wolcott Square Historic District
First Presbyterian Church of Yorktown		1840 built	2880 Crompond Road; 41.2943°N 73.8091°W	Yorktown, New York	Listed on the APRHS #4, founded 1730, burned by the British 1779, rebuilt 1785
Caldwell Presbyterian Church		mid-1850s built	71 Montcalm St. 43.425083°N 73.714925°W	Lake George, New York	NRHP listed Listed 4/12/2016, number 16000164
Redeemer Presbyterian Church (New York, New York)		1989	150 West 83rd Street	New York, New York	A PCA church, one of the most influential Presbyterian churches in America founded by Tim Keller

== North Carolina ==
Church	Image	Dates	Location	City, State	Description
Bethesda Presbyterian Church (Aberdeen, North Carolina)		1860 built 1979 NRHP-listed	NC 5; 35°7′52″N 79°24′45″W	Aberdeen, North Carolina	
Long Creek Presbyterian Church		1876 built	Rural area between Bessemer City and Kings Mountain; 35.2883592°N 81.3286876°W	Gaston County, North Carolina	
East Avenue Tabernacle Associated Reformed Presbyterian Church		1914 built 2005 NRHP-listed	927 Elizabeth St. 35°13′10″N 80°50′4″W	Charlotte, North Carolina	Classical Revival
First Presbyterian Church (Charlotte, North Carolina)		1857 built 1982 NRHP-listed	200 W. Trade St. 35°13′44″N 80°50′38″W	Charlotte, North Carolina	Gothic Revival
Steele Creek Presbyterian Church and Cemetery		1889 built 1991 NRHP-listed	35°11′3″N 80°57′23″W	Charlotte, North Carolina	Gothic Revival
Brown Marsh Presbyterian Church		1828 built 1975 NRHP-listed	34°31′33″N 78°38′19″W	Clarkton, North Carolina	Pre-Greek Revival
Third Creek Presbyterian Church and Cemetery		1835 built 1983 NRHP-listed	35°45′39″N 80°41′4″W	Cleveland, North Carolina	
MacPherson Presbyterian Church		1800 founded	35.060523°N 78.9454116°W	Fayetteville, North Carolina	
Crossnore Presbyterian Church		1924 built 1996 NRHP-listed	US 221/NC 194 E side, opposite jct. with Dellinger Rd. 36°1′5″N 81°55′47″W	Crossnore, North Carolina	Bungalow/Craftsman
Mt. Horeb Presbyterian Church and Cemetery		built NRHP-listed		Elizabethtown, North Carolina	
First Presbyterian Church (Fayetteville, North Carolina)		1816 built 1976 NRHP-listed	Ann and Bow Sts. 35°3′12″N 78°52′32″W	Fayetteville, North Carolina	Federal
Griers Presbyterian Church and Cemetery		built NRHP-listed		Frogsboro, North Carolina	
Franklin Presbyterian Church		built NRHP-listed		Franklin, North Carolina	
South River Presbyterian Church		built NRHP-listed		Garland, North Carolina	
First Presbyterian Church (Goldsboro, North Carolina)		built NRHP-listed		Goldsboro, North Carolina	
Buffalo Presbyterian Church		1775 built 2002 NRHP-listed	800–803 Sixteenth Street; 36°6′33″N 79°46′49″W	Greensboro, North Carolina	Colonial
First Presbyterian Church (Hickory, North Carolina)		built NRHP-listed		Hickory, North Carolina	
First Presbyterian Church (Highlands, North Carolina)		built NRHP-listed		Highlands, North Carolina	
Big Rockfish Presbyterian Church		built NRHP-listed		Hope Mills, North Carolina	
Dorland Memorial Presbyterian Church		built NRHP-listed		Hot Springs, North Carolina	
Bethesda Presbyterian Church, Session House and Cemetery		1853 built 1980 NRHP-listed		Houstonville, North Carolina	
Ebenezer Academy, Bethany Presbyterian Church and Cemetery		built NRHP-listed		Houstonville, North Carolina	
Hopewell Presbyterian Church and Cemetery		built NRHP-listed		Huntersville, North Carolina	
Ramah Presbyterian Church and Cemetery		built NRHP-listed		Huntersville, North Carolina	
Black River Presbyterian and Ivanhoe Baptist Churches		built NRHP-listed		Ivanhoe, North Carolina	
Kinston Baptist-White Rock Presbyterian Church		built NRHP-listed		Kinston, North Carolina	
LaGrange Presbyterian Church		built NRHP-listed		LaGrange, North Carolina	
Laurel Hill Presbyterian Church		built NRHP-listed		Laurinburg, North Carolina	
Summerville Presbyterian Church and Cemetery		built NRHP-listed		Lillington, North Carolina	
First Presbyterian Church (Lincolnton, North Carolina)		built NRHP-listed		Lincolnton, North Carolina	
First Presbyterian Church (Marion, North Carolina)		built 1923; NRHP-listed 1991		Marion, North Carolina	
Providence Presbyterian Church and Cemetery		built NRHP-listed		Matthews, North Carolina	
Cross Roads Presbyterian Church and Cemetery and Stainback Store		built NRHP-listed		Mebane, North Carolina	
Hawfields Presbyterian Church		built NRHP-listed		Mebane, North Carolina	
Thyatira Presbyterian Church, Cemetery, and Manse		built NRHP-listed		Mill Bridge, North Carolina	
First Presbyterian Church (Morehead, North Carolina)	Morehead City, North Carolina				
Centre Presbyterian Church, Session House and Cemeteries		built NRHP-listed		Mount Mourne, North Carolina	
Coddle Creek Associate Reformed Presbyterian Church, Session House and Cemetery		built NRHP-listed		Mount Mourne, North Carolina	
Back Creek Presbyterian Church and Cemeterey		built NRHP-listed		Mt. Ulla, North Carolina	
Ebenezer Presbyterian Church (New Bern, North Carolina)		built 1924; NRHP-listed 1991		New Bern, North Carolina	
First Presbyterian Church and Churchyard		built NRHP-listed		New Bern, North Carolina	
Philadelphus Presbyterian Church		built NRHP-listed		Philadelphus, North Carolina	
Hebron Presbyterian Church		built NRHP-listed		Pink Hill, North Carolina	
Pittsboro Presbyterian Church		built NRHP-listed		Pittsboro, North Carolina	
Rocky River Presbyterian Church		built NRHP-listed		Rocky River, North Carolina	
Ashpole Presbyterian Church		built NRHP-listed		Rowland, North Carolina	
Buffalo Presbyterian Church and Cemeteries		built NRHP-listed		Sanford, North Carolina	
Euphronia Presbyterian Church		built NRHP-listed		Sanford, North Carolina	
Red House Presbyterian Church		built NRHP-listed		Semora, North Carolina	
Waldensian Presbyterian Church		built NRHP-listed		Valdese, North Carolina	
Old Bluff Presbyterian Church		built NRHP-listed		Wade, North Carolina	
Oak Plain Presbyterian Church		built NRHP-listed		Waycross, North Carolina	
Wilkesboro Presbyterian Church		built NRHP-listed		Wilkesboro, North Carolina	
First Presbyterian Church (Wilmington, North Carolina)		built NRHP-listed		Wilmington, North Carolina	
First Presbyterian Church (Wilson, North Carolina)		built NRHP-listed		Wilson, North Carolina	
Lloyd Presbyterian Church		built NRHP-listed		Winston-Salem, North Carolina	

== North Dakota ==
Church	Image	Dates	Location	City, State	Description
First Presbyterian Church of Steele		1922 built 2004 NRHP-listed	Mitchell Ave. N and First St. 46°51′17″N 99°54′56″W	Steele, North Dakota	Romanesque
Westminster Presbyterian Church (Devils Lake, North Dakota)		1915 built 2008 NRHP-listed	501 5th St. NE. 48°06′47″N 98°51′31″W	Devils Lake, North Dakota	Joseph A. Shannon-designed in Romanesque style

== Ohio ==
Church	Image	Dates	Location	City, State	Description
Rock Hill Presbyterian Church		1903 built 2009 NRHP-listed	52644 High Ridge Road40°2′15″N 80°46′22″W	Bellaire, Ohio	Late Gothic Revival40°02′15″N 80°46′22″W
Kilgore Union Presbyterian Church		1828 built 1995 NRHP-listed	40°27′37″N 81°0′0″W	Carrollton, Ohio	Gothic Revival
Mount Zion Presbyterian Church		built NRHP-listed		Chandlersville, Ohio	
Covenant First Presbyterian Church		built NRHP-listed		Cincinnati, Ohio	
Fulton-Presbyterian Cemetery		built NRHP-listed		Cincinnati, Ohio	
Pilgrim Presbyterian Church		built NRHP-listed		Cincinnati, Ohio	
Walnut Hills United Presbyterian Church		built NRHP-listed		Cincinnati, Ohio	
Euclid Avenue Presbyterian Church		built NRHP-listed		Cleveland, Ohio	
North Presbyterian Church		built NRHP-listed		Cleveland, Ohio	
East Broad Street Presbyterian Church		built NRHP-listed		Columbus, Ohio	
Second Presbyterian Church (Columbus, Ohio)		built NRHP-listed		Columbus, Ohio	
Welsh Presbyterian Church (Columbus, Ohio)		built NRHP-listed		Columbus, Ohio	
Fredericktown Presbyterian Church		built NRHP-listed		Fredericktown, Ohio	
Middle Sandy Presbyterian Church		built NRHP-listed		Homeworth, Ohio	
Independence Presbyterian Church		built NRHP-listed		Independence, Ohio	
Congregational-Presbyterian Church		built NRHP-listed		Kinsman, Ohio	NRHP-listed
First Presbyterian Church of Maumee Chapel		built 1837; NRHP-listed 1973		Maumee, Ohio	Old church is now the chapel
First Presbyterian Church (Napoleon, Ohio)		built NRHP-listed		Napoleon, Ohio	NRHP-listed
Pataskala Presbyterian Church		built NRHP-listed		Pataskala, Ohio	
First Presbyterian Church (Portsmouth, Ohio)		built NRHP-listed		Portsmouth, Ohio	NRHP-listed
Second Presbyterian Church (Portsmouth, Ohio)		built NRHP-listed		Portsmouth, Ohio	
Red Oak Presbyterian Church		built NRHP-listed		Ripley, Ohio	NRHP-listed
Third Presbyterian Church (Springfield, Ohio)		built NRHP-listed		Springfield, Ohio	
First Presbyterian Church (Troy, Ohio)		built NRHP-listed		Troy, Ohio	NRHP-listed
First Presbyterian Church of Wapakoneta		built NRHP-listed		Wapakoneta, Ohio	NRHP-listed
West Union Presbyterian Church		built NRHP-listed		West Union, Ohio	
Central College Presbyterian Church		built NRHP-listed		Westerville, Ohio	
Presbyterian Parsonage		built NRHP-listed		Westerville, Ohio	
Worthington United Presbyterian Church		built NRHP-listed		Worthington, Ohio	
Wyoming Presbyterian Church		built NRHP-listed		Wyoming, Ohio	

== Oklahoma ==
Church	Image	Dates	Location	City, State	Description
City Presbyterian Church		1984 NRHP-listed	1433 Classen Drive; 35°29′0.24″N 97°31′37.07″W	Oklahoma City, Oklahoma	Late Gothic Revival
First Presbyterian Church (Atoka, Oklahoma)		2007 NRHP-listed	212 E. 1st St. 34°23′2″N 96°7′35″W	Atoka, Oklahoma	Romanesque
Presbyterian Church (Beaver City, Oklahoma)		1887 built 1974 NRHP-listed	3rd St. and Ave. E 36°48′50.98″N 100°31′13.01″W	Beaver City, Oklahoma	
Bristow Presbyterian Church		1922 built 1979 NRHP-listed	6th and Elm Sts. 35°49′57″N 96°23′35″W	Bristow, Oklahoma	Late Gothic Revival
First Presbyterian Church of Chandler		1894 built 1984 NRHP-listed	8th and Blaine Sts. 35°42′10″N 96°52′58″W	Chandler, Oklahoma	Carpenter Gothic
First Presbyterian Church of Coweta		1907 built 2003 NRHP-listed	35°57′47″N 95°39′42″W	Coweta, Oklahoma	Late Gothic Revival
Oklahoma Presbyterian College		1910 built 1976 NRHP-listed	601 N. 16th St. 34°0′0″N 96°23′35″W	Durant, Oklahoma	Also known as the Oklahoma Presbyterian College for Girls
First Presbyterian Church of Lawton		1902 built 1979 NRHP-listed	8th St. and D Ave. 34°36′13″N 98°23′58″W	Lawton, Oklahoma	Late Gothic Revival
First Presbyterian Church (McAlester, Oklahoma)		1895 built 1979 NRHP-listed	101 E. Washington Ave. 34°56′3″N 95°46′41″W	McAlester, Oklahoma	Shingle Style
First Presbyterian Church (Sallisaw, Oklahoma)		1918 built 2003 NRHP-listed	120 S. Oak St. 35°27′27″N 94°47′17″W	Sallisaw, Oklahoma	Classical Revival
First Presbyterian Church of Tonkawa		1905 built 1994 NRHP-listed	109 S. 4th St. 36°40′43″N 97°18′18″W	Tonkawa, Oklahoma	Side-steeple church
First Presbyterian Church (Tulsa)		1885 founded 1926 built	36°8′59″N 95°59′14″W	Tulsa, Oklahoma	Gothic
First Presbyterian Church (Waurika, Oklahoma)		1908 built 2002 NRHP-listed	124 West Broadway; 34°9′54″N 98°0′7″W	Waurika, Oklahoma	Side-tower church

== Oregon ==
Church	Image	Dates	Location	City, State	Description
United Presbyterian Church and Rectory		1891 built 1979 NRHP-listed	510 SW 5th Ave. 44°38′.3″N 123°6′34.5″W	Albany, Oregon	Walter D. Pugh, H. C. Chamberlain; Carpenter Gothic
First Presbyterian Church (Cottage Grove, Oregon)		1951 built 1974 NRHP-listed	216 S. 3rd St. 43°47′42″N 123°3′48″W	Cottage Grove, Oregon	Designed by architect Pietro Belluschi in his Pacific Northwest architecture style
Tualatin Plains Presbyterian Church (The Old Scotch Church)		1878 built 1974 NRHP-listed	30685 Scotch Church Road (in unincorporated area of Washington County); 45°34′22″N 122°59′39″W	Hillsboro, Oregon (nearest city)	Carpenter Gothic
Calvary Presbyterian Church		1882 built 1972 NRHP-listed	1422 SW 11th Ave; 45°30′56″N 122°41′09″W	Portland, Oregon	High Victorian Gothic
First Presbyterian Church (Portland, Oregon)		1886–1890 built 1974 NRHP-listed	1200 SW Alder; 45°31′17″N 122°41′0″W	Portland, Oregon	High Victorian Gothic
First Presbyterian Church of Redmond		1912 built 2001 NRHP-listed	44.27474°N 121.17513°W	Redmond, Oregon	Gothic Revival
First Presbyterian Church (Roseburg, Oregon)		1909 built 1988 NRHP-listed	823 SE Lane Avenue; 43°12′25″N 123°20′45″W	Roseburg, Oregon	Late Gothic Revival
Pleasant Grove Presbyterian Church		1858 built NRHP-listed		Salem, Oregon	
United Presbyterian Church of Shedd		1892 built NRHP-listed		Shedd, Oregon	
Mt. Pleasant Presbyterian Church		1856 built 1974 NRHP-listed	44°45′31″N 122°44′38″W	Stayton, Oregon	
Spring Valley Presbyterian Church		1859 built 1974 NRHP-listed	45.0088°N 123.1283°W	Zena, Oregon	American Queen Anne style

== South Carolina ==
Church	Image	Dates	Location	City, State	Description
Old Presbyterian Church		built NRHP-listed		Barnwell, South Carolina	
Mt. Zion Presbyterian Church		built NRHP-listed		Bishopville, South Carolina	
Bethesda Presbyterian Church		1822 built 1985 NHL-designated	502 Dekalb Street; 34°14′46″N 80°36′19.28″W	Camden, South Carolina	Neoclassical
John's Island Presbyterian Church	Oblique View	built NRHP-listed		Charleston, South Carolina	
Catholic Presbyterian Church		built NRHP-listed		Chester, South Carolina	
Duncan's Creek Presbyterian Church		1842 built 1973 NRHP-listed	34°31′18″N 81°48′29″W	Clinton, South Carolina	
Thornwell-Presbyterian College Historic District		built NRHP-listed		Clinton, South Carolina	
Bethel Presbyterian Church		built NRHP-listed		Clover, South Carolina	
First Presbyterian Church (Columbia, South Carolina)		built NRHP-listed		Columbia, South Carolina	NRHP-listed
Ladson Presbyterian Church		built NRHP-listed		Columbia, South Carolina	
Woodrow Memorial Presbyterian Church		built NRHP-listed		Columbia, South Carolina	
Kingston Presbyterian Church		built NRHP-listed		Conway, South Carolina	
Kingston Presbyterian Church Cemetery		built NRHP-listed		Conway, South Carolina	
Greenville Presbyterian Church		built NRHP-listed		Donalds, South Carolina	
Edisto Island Presbyterian Church		built NRHP-listed		Edisto Island, South Carolina	
Presbyterian Manse		built NRHP-listed		Edisto Island, South Carolina	
Hopewell Presbyterian Church and Hopewell Cemetery		built NRHP-listed		Florence, South Carolina	
Unity Presbyterian Church Complex		built NRHP-listed		Fort Mill, South Carolina	
Fairview Presbyterian Church		built NRHP-listed		Fountain Inn, South Carolina	
Richland Presbyterian Church		built NRHP-listed		Gadsden, South Carolina	
First Presbyterian Church (Greenville, South Carolina)		founded built		Greenville, South Carolina	
Hopkins Presbyterian Church		built NRHP-listed		Hopkins, South Carolina	
Ebenezer Associate Reformed Presbyterian Church		built NRHP-listed		Jenkinsville, South Carolina	
Lancaster Presbyterian Church		built NRHP-listed		Lancaster, South Carolina	
Waxhaw Presbyterian Church Cemetery		built NRHP-listed		Lancaster, South Carolina	
Bethesda Presbyterian Church		built NRHP-listed		McConnells, South Carolina	
Stoney Creek Independent Presbyterian Chapel of Prince William Parish		built NRHP-listed		McPhersonville, South Carolina	
Pelzer Presbyterian Church		built NRHP-listed		Pelzer, South Carolina	
First Presbyterian Church (Rock Hill, South Carolina)		1894 built 1992 NRHP-listed	234 E. Main St. 34°55′25″N 81°1′31″W	Rock Hill, South Carolina	Charles Coker Wilson-designed; Late Victorian
Hermon Presbyterian Church		built NRHP-listed		Rock Hill, South Carolina	
Old Pickens Presbyterian Church		built NRHP-listed		Seneca, South Carolina	
Lynchburg Presbyterian Church		built NRHP-listed		South Lynchburg, South Carolina	
First Presbyterian Church (Spartanburg, South Carolina)		founded built		Spartanburg, South Carolina	
Salem Black River Presbyterian Church		built NRHP-listed		Sumter, South Carolina	
Lower Long Cane Associate Reformed Presbyterian Church		built NRHP-listed		Troy, South Carolina	
Concord Presbyterian Church		built NRHP-listed		Winnsboro, South Carolina	
Mount Olivet Presbyterian Church		built NRHP-listed		Winnsboro, South Carolina	
First Presbyterian Church of Woodruff		built NRHP-listed		Woodruff, South Carolina	NRHP-listed
Redeemer Presbyterian Church (Charleston, South Carolina)		1840 built	43 Wentworth St.	Charleston, South Carolina	Greek Revival

== South Dakota ==
Church	Image	Dates	Location	City, State	Description
First Presbyterian Church of Langford		1925 built 1991 NRHP-listed	Jct. of Main and Findley Sts. 45°36′10″N 97°49′56″W	Langford, South Dakota	Vernacular Akron plan, photo shows marker, apparently destroyed 1997
Welsh Presbyterian Church (Plana, South Dakota)		1887 built 1995 NRHP-listed	7 mi. N of SD 12 and 1 mi. E of SD 16; 45°31′8″N 98°18′39″W	Plana, South Dakota	
Brown Earth Presbyterian Church		1877 built 1984 NRHP-listed	45°7′20″N 96°46′19″W	Stockholm, South Dakota	

== Tennessee ==
Church	Image	Dates	Location	City, State	Description
First United Presbyterian Church (Athens, Tennessee)		1892 built 2008 NRHP-listed	321 N. Jackson St.	Athens, Tennessee	Gothic Revival
Downtown Presbyterian Church of Nashville		1816 founded 1848–49 built 1993 NHL-designated		Nashville, Tennessee	Egyptian Revival
First Presbyterian Church		1838 founded 1910 built 2009 NRHP-listed	554 McCallie Avenue; 35°2′51″N 85°18′8″W	Chattanooga, Tennessee	Stanford White-designed building, founding congregation of the Presbyterian Church in America
First Presbyterian Church (Clarksville, Tennessee)				Clarksville, Tennessee	NRHP-listed in Montgomery County. See also First Presbyterian Church Manse (Clarksville, Tennessee), also NRHP-listed.
First Presbyterian Church (Cleveland, Tennessee)				Cleveland, Tennessee	NRHP-listed in Bradley County
First Presbyterian Church of Clifton				Clifton, Tennessee	NRHP-listed in Wayne County
First Presbyterian Church (Cookeville, Tennessee)				Cookeville, Tennessee	NRHP-listed in Putnam County
Mt. Carmel Presbyterian Church (Covington, Tennessee)		built NRHP-listed		Covington, Tennessee	
First Presbyterian Church (Greeneville, Tennessee)		founded built		Greeneville, Tennessee	
First Presbyterian Church (Knoxville, Tennessee)				Knoxville, Tennessee	Church whose First Presbyterian Church Cemetery is NRHP-listed in Knox County
First Presbyterian Church (McMinnville, Tennessee)				McMinnville, Tennessee	NRHP-listed in Warren County
First Presbyterian Church (Memphis, Tennessee)				Memphis, Tennessee	NRHP-listed in Shelby County
First Presbyterian Church (Murfreesboro, Tennessee)				Murfreesboro, Tennessee	NRHP-listed in Rutherford County
First Presbyterian Church of Pulaski				Pulaski, Tennessee	NRHP-listed in Giles County
Allardt Presbyterian Church		built NRHP-listed		Allardt, Tennessee	
Cane Ridge Cumberland Presbyterian Church		built NRHP-listed		Antioch, Tennessee	
Beth Salem Presbyterian Church		built NRHP-listed		Athens, Tennessee	
Bethel Springs Presbyterian Church		built NRHP-listed		Bethel Springs, Tennessee	
Bethany Presbyterian Church Complex		built NRHP-listed		Bryson, Tennessee	
Chapel Hill Cumberland Presbyterian Church		built NRHP-listed		Chapel Hill, Tennessee	
Charleston Cumberland Presbyterian Church		built NRHP-listed		Charleston, Tennessee	
Clear Springs Cumberland Presbyterian Church		built NRHP-listed		Calhoun, Tennessee	
Northside United Presbyterian		built NRHP-listed		Chattanooga, Tennessee	
Second Presbyterian Church (Chattanooga, Tennessee)		built NRHP-listed		Chattanooga, Tennessee	
First Presbyterian Church (Clarksville, Tennessee)		built NRHP-listed		Clarksville, Tennessee	
First Presbyterian Church Manse		built NRHP-listed		Clarksville, Tennessee	
First Presbyterian Church of Clifton		built NRHP-listed		Clifton, Tennessee	
Pleasant Mount Cumberland Presbyterian Church		built NRHP-listed		Columbia, Tennessee	
Zion Presbyterian Church		built NRHP-listed		Columbia, Tennessee	
Denmark Presbyterian Church		built NRHP-listed		Denmark, Tennessee	
Spring Creek Presbyterian Church		built NRHP-listed		Doaks Crossroads, Tennessee	
Cloyd's Creek Presbyterian Church		built NRHP-listed		Friendsville, Tennessee	
Gallatin Presbyterian Church		built NRHP-listed		Gallatin, Tennessee	
New Bethel Cumberland Presbyterian Church		built NRHP-listed		Greeneville, Tennessee	
Old Kingsport Presbyterian Church		built NRHP-listed		Kingsport, Tennessee	
First Presbyterian Church Cemetery (Knoxville, Tennessee)		built NRHP-listed		Knoxville, Tennessee	
Salem Presbyterian Church (Limestone, Tennessee)		built NRHP-listed		Limestone, Tennessee	
Cumberland Presbyterian Church of Loudon		built NRHP-listed		Loudon, Tennessee	
St. Paul Presbyterian Church		built NRHP-listed		Lowland, Tennessee	
Anderson Presbyterian Church		built NRHP-listed		Madison Hall, Tennessee	
Manchester Cumberland Presbyterian Church		built NRHP-listed		Manchester, Tennessee	
First Cumberland Presbyterian Church-McKenzie		built NRHP-listed		McKenzie, Tennessee	
First Presbyterian Church (Memphis, Tennessee)		built NRHP-listed		Memphis, Tennessee	
Second Presbyterian Church (Memphis, Tennessee)		built NRHP-listed		Memphis, Tennessee	
Idlewild Presbyterian Church		built NRHP-listed		Memphis, Tennessee	
Bear Creek Cumberland Presbyterian Church		built NRHP-listed		Mooresville, Tennessee	
First Presbyterian Church (Nashville, Tennessee)		built NRHP-listed		Nashville, Tennessee	
New Market Presbyterian Church		built NRHP-listed		New Market, Tennessee	
Oakland Presbyterian Church		built NRHP-listed		Oakland, Tennessee	
St. Marks Presbyterian Church (Rogersville, Tennessee)		built NRHP-listed		Rogersville, Tennessee	
Bethesda Presbyterian Church (Russellville, Tennessee)		built NRHP-listed		Russellville, Tennessee	
First Presbyterian Church (Shelbyville, Tennessee)		built NRHP-listed		Shelbyville, Tennessee	NRHP-listed in Bedford County
Spring Hill Presbyterian Church		built NRHP-listed		Spring Hill, Tennessee	
New Providence Presbyterian Church, Academy, and Cemetery		built NRHP-listed		Surgoinsville, Tennessee	
First Presbyterian Church (Sweetwater, Tennessee)		built NRHP-listed		Sweetwater, Tennessee	NRHP-listed in Monroe County
Waynesboro Cumberland Presbyterian Church		built NRHP-listed		Waynesboro, Tennessee	
Whitwell Cumberland Presbyterian Church		1892 built 2018 NRHP-listed		Whitwell, Tennessee	
Richland Associate Reformed Presbyterian Church		Built 1950		Rosemark, Tennessee	

== Texas ==
Church	Image	Dates	Location	City, State	Description
First Presbyterian Church (Abilene, Texas)		1924 built 1992 NRHP-listed	402 Orange St. 32°27′12″N 99°44′15″W	Abilene, Texas	Late Gothic Revival
Central Presbyterian Church (Amarillo, Texas)		1991 NRHP-listed	1100 Harrison St. 35°12′10″N 101°50′26″W	Amarillo, Texas	Late Gothic Revival, Tudor Revival
Hyde Park Presbyterian Church		1896 built 1990 NRHP-listed	3915 Ave. B 30°18′13″N 97°44′4″W	Austin, Texas	Vernacular Ecclesiastical
First Presbyterian Church (Brownwood, Texas)		founded built		Brownwood, Texas	
First Presbyterian Church of Dallas		1856 founded 1913 built	408 Park Avenue; 32°46′45″N 96°47′36″W	Dallas, Texas	Neoclassical
Texana Presbyterian Church		1860 built 1979 NRHP-listed	Apollo Dr. and Country Club Lane; 28°57′53″N 96°39′20″W	Edna, Texas	Greek Revival
First Presbyterian Church (Galveston, Texas)		1872 built 1979 NRHP-listed	1903 Church St. 29°18′15″N 94°47′19″W	Galveston, Texas	Romanesque, Norman Romanesque
First Presbyterian Church (Houston, Texas)				Houston, Texas	
Presbyterian Manse		1839 built 1969 NRHP-listed	NE corner of Alley and Delta Sts. 32°45′27″N 94°21′3″W	Jefferson, Texas	Greek Revival
First Presbyterian Church (Mineral Wells, Texas)		1909 built 1979 NRHP-listed	410 NW 2nd St. 32°48′41″N 98°6′56″W	Mineral Wells, Texas	Classical Revival
First Presbyterian Church (Palestine, Texas)		1887 built 1998 NRHP-listed	410 Avenue A 31°45′45″N 95°37′44″W	Palestine, Texas	Gothic Revival
First Presbyterian Church (Paris, Texas)		1892 built 1988 NRHP-listed	410 W. Kaufman; 33°39′35″N 95°33′37″W	Paris, Texas	Romanesque, Richardsonian Romanesque
First Presbyterian Church (San Angelo, Texas)		1906 built 1988 NRHP-listed	32 N. Irving; 31°27′51″N 100°26′30″W	San Angelo, Texas	Eclectic
Fort Street Presbyterian Church		1901 built 1984 NRHP-listed	516 W. Hopkins St. 29°52′55″N 97°56′48″W	San Marcos, Texas	Late Gothic Revival
First Presbyterian Church (Van Horn, Texas)		1901 built 1978 NRHP-listed	Fannin and 3rd Sts. 31°2′33″N 104°50′4″W	Van Horn, Texas	Carpenter Gothic
Highland Park Presbyterian Church (Dallas, Texas)		1926 founded, 1928 completed	3821 University Boulevard,	University Park, Texas	Gothic revival, member of ECO: A Covenant Order of Evangelical Presbyterians
Presbyterian Iglesia Nicea		1910 built 1992 NRHP-listed	401 S. DeLeon; 28°47′43″N 97°0′16″W	Victoria, Texas	Jules Leffland-designed; Late Gothic Revival
Central Presbyterian Church (Waxahachie, Texas)		1917 built 1987 NRHP-listed	402 N. College; 32°23′20″N 96°50′40″W	Waxahachie, Texas	Late Gothic Revival
Park Cities Presbyterian Church (Dallas, Texas)		1991	4124 Oak Lawn Ave, Dallas, TX	Dallas, Texas	A PCA church, the largest Presbyterian Church in Texas with 5,500 attenders

== Utah ==
Church	Image	Dates	Location	City, State	Description
American Fork Presbyterian Church		1879 built 1980 NRHP-listed	75 N. 1st East St. 40°22′41″N 111°47′44″W	American Fork, Utah	Gothic Revival
Ferron Presbyterian Church and Cottage		1908 built 1978 NRHP-listed	Mill Rd. and 3rd West; 39°5′36″N 111°8′28″W	Ferron, Utah	Late Gothic Revival
Green River Presbyterian Church		1906 built 1989 NRHP-listed	134 W. Third Ave. 38°59′45″N 110°9′54″W	Green River, Utah	Late Gothic Revival
Manti Presbyterian Church		1881 built 1980 NRHP-listed	U.S. 89; 39°15′42″N 111°38′8″W	Manti, Utah	Gothic Revival
Monroe Presbyterian Church		1844 built 1980 NRHP-listed	20 E. 100 North; 38°38′2″N 112°7′16″W	Monroe, Utah	
Payson Presbyterian Church		1882 built 1986 NRHP-listed	160 S. Main; 40°2′7″N 111°43′54″W	Payson, Utah	Gothic Revival
Salina Presbyterian Church		1884 built 1980 NRHP-listed	204 S. 1st East; 38°57′17″N 111°51′27″W	Salina, Utah	
First Presbyterian Church		1873 founded 1903 built	S. Temple; 40.769756°N 111.880230°W	Salt Lake City, Utah	
Third Presbyterian Church Parsonage		c.1890 built 2000 NRHP-listed	1068 E. Blaine Ave. 40°43′56″N 111°51′35″W	Salt Lake City, Utah	Late Victorian, Rectangular Block; artifact of the significant Third Presbyterian Church, no longer extant
Springville Presbyterian Church		1892 built 1980 NRHP-listed	251 S. 200 East; 40°9′47″N 111°36′21″W	Springville, Utah	Late Gothic Revival, Modified Late Gothic Revival, other architecture

== Virginia ==
Church	Image	Dates	Location	City, State	Description
Old Presbyterian Meeting House		1780s built 2001 NRHP-listed	321 S. Fairfax St. 38°48′5″N 77°2′38″W	Alexandria, Virginia	Early Republic
First Presbyterian Church (Arlington, Virginia)		founded built		Arlington, Virginia	
New Providence Presbyterian Church		built NRHP-listed		Brownsburg, Virginia	
Korean Central Presbyterian Church		1973 founded	15451 Lee Highway; 38°53′13.9″N 77°14′24.5″W	Centreville, Virginia	
Trinity Presbyterian Church (Charlottesville, Virginia)		1976 founded		Charlottesville, Virginia	
Chester Presbyterian Church		1880 built 1976 NRHP-listed	Jct. of Osborne Rd. and VA 10; 37°21′33″N 77°25′53″W	Chester, Virginia	Gothic Revival
Christiansburg Presbyterian Church		1853 built 1978 NRHP-listed	107 W. Main St. 37°7′42″N 80°24′41″W	Christiansburg, Virginia	Greek Revival
Slate Mountain Presbyterian Church and Cemetery		1932 built 2007 NRHP-listed		Christiansburg, Virginia	Gothic Revival; one of the "Rock Churches" founded by Robert Childress
Cove Presbyterian Church		1858 built 1992 NRHP-listed	37°1′34″N 81°2′15″W	Covesville, Virginia	Wytheville, Virginia; Greek Revival
New Dublin Presbyterian Church		1858 built 2004 NRHP-listed		Dublin, Virginia	Greek Revival, Gothic Revival
Bluemont Presbyterian Church and Cemetery		1920-46 built 2007 NRHP-listed		Fancy Gap, Virginia	Gothic Revival
Tinkling Spring Presbyterian Church		1740 founded 1850 built 1973 NRHP-listed		Fishersville, Virginia	Designed by pastor Robert Lewis Dabney in Greek Revival
Floyd Presbyterian Church		1850 built 1976 NRHP-listed	U.S. 221; 36°54′40″N 80°19′6″W	Floyd, Virginia	Greek Revival
Presbyterian Church of Fredericksburg		1833 built 1984 NRHP-listed	SW of Princess Anne and George Sts. 38°18′6″N 77°27′38″W	Fredericksburg, Virginia	Early Republic, Jeffersonian Roman Revival
Falling Spring Presbyterian Church Manse		built NRHP-listed		Glasgow, Virginia	
Byrd Presbyterian Church		1748 founded 1838 built 2000 NRHP-listed	2229 Dogtown Rd. 37°42′50″N 77°56′24″W	Goochland, Virginia	
Greenwich Presbyterian Church and Cemetery		1859 built 1989 NRHP-listed	9510 Burwell Rd. 38°44′54″N 77°38′53″W	Greenwich, Virginia	Gothic Revival
Providence Presbyterian Church		1747 built 1973 NRHP-listed	NW of Gum Spring off U.S. 25037°47′6″N 77°54′19″W	Gum Spring, Virginia	
Hartwood Presbyterian Church		1866 built 1989 NRHP-listed	Jct. VA 705 and 612; 38°24′6″N 77°34′2″W	Hartwood, Virginia	Greek Revival
Dinwiddie Presbyterian Church and Cemetery		1948 built 2007 NRHP-listed	2698 Homestead Rd. 36°51′46″N 80°43′5″W	Hillsville, Virginia	Another "Rock Church" associated with Robert Childress; Gothic Revival
Ashburn Presbyterian Church		1878 built 1999 NRHP-listed	20962 Ashburn Rd. 39°2′38″N 77°29′26″W	Leesburg, Virginia	Gothic
Lexington Presbyterian Church		1843 built 1979 NRHP-listed	Main and Nelson Sts. 37°47′2″N 79°26′35″W	Lexington, Virginia	Greek Revival, designed by Thomas U. Walter
Timber Ridge Presbyterian Church		1756 built 1969 NRHP-listed	37°50′33″N 79°21′31″W	Lexington, Virginia	
Presbyterian Orphans Home		1911 built 2010 NRHP-listed	150 Linden Ave. 37°26′50″N 79°11′42″W	Lynchburg, Virginia	Georgian Revival, Greek Revival
Mayberry Presbyterian Church		1925 built 2007 NRHP-listed	Jct. of Osborne Rd. and VA 10; 36°42′44″N 80°26′20″W	Meadows of Dan, Virginia	Gothic Revival; another associated with Robert Childress
Mitchells Presbyterian Church		1879 built 1980 NRHP-listed	VA 652; 38°22′46″N 78°1′27″W	Mitchells, Virginia	Gothic, Carpenter Gothic
Buffalo Presbyterian Church (Pamplin, Virginia)		1804 built 1995 NRHP-listed	37°14′25″N 78°36′3″W	Pamplin, Virginia	Early Republic
Walker's Creek Presbyterian Church		1898 built 2003 NRHP-listed	37°11′39″N 80°50′20″W	Pearisburg, Virginia	Gothic Revival
Second Presbyterian Church (Petersburg, Virginia)		1848 built 1972 NRHP-listed	9 N. 5th St. 37°32′25″N 77°26′23″W	Petersburg, Virginia	Designed by Minard Lafever
Olivet Presbyterian Church		1856 built 1978 NRHP-listed	37°28′48″N 77°3′50″W	Providence Forge, Virginia	Greek Revival
Waddell Memorial Presbyterian Church		1874 built 1975 NRHP-listed	38°18′29″N 78°3′46″W	Rapidan, Virginia	Carpenter's Gothic
Second Presbyterian Church (Richmond, Virginia)		1848 built 1972 NRHP-listed	9 N. 5th St. 37°32′25″N 77°26′23″W	Richmond, Virginia	Gothic
Salem Presbyterian Church (Salem, Virginia)		1851 built 1974 NRHP-listed	E. Main and Market Sts. 37°17′34″N 80°3′26″W	Salem, Virginia	Greek Revival church whose Salem Presbyterian Parsonage is also separately NRHP-listed
Oakland Grove Presbyterian Church		1847 built 1982 NRHP-listed	37°48′6″N 79°51′37″W	Selma, Virginia	
Strasburg Presbyterian Church		1830 built	325 South Holliday Street	Strasburg, Virginia	Oldest building still standing in Strasburg, and oldest church in its county.
Willis Presbyterian Church and Cemetery		1954 built 2007 NRHP-listed	5733 Floyd Highway, S. 36°51′26″N 80°29′0″W	Willis, Virginia	Gothic Revival; associated with Robert Childress
Buffalo Mountain Presbyterian Church and Cemetery		1929 built 2007 NRHP-listed	2102 Childress Rd. 36°46′39″N 80°31′3″W	Willis, Virginia	First of the 5 "rock churches" founded by Bob Childress, Greek Revival
Opequon Presbyterian Church		1742 built 2001 NRHP-listed	39°8′20″N 78°11′43″W	Winchester, Virginia	Late Victorian, Gothic Revival
Crockett's Cove Presbyterian Church		1858 built 1992 NRHP-listed	37°1′34″N 81°2′15″W	Wytheville, Virginia	Greek Revival

== Washington State ==
Church	Image	Dates	Location	City, State	Description
Emmanuel Presbyterian Church				Spokane, Washington	
Emmanuel Presbyterian Church		1908 built PC(USA)	1926 W Chelan Ave. 47°40′55.94″N 117°26′25.05″W	Spokane, Washington	Midcentury Modern

== West Virginia ==
Church	Image	Dates	Location	City, State	Description
Kuhn Memorial Presbyterian Church		APRHS 444		Barboursville, West Virginia	
Davis Memorial Presbyterian Church		1894 built 1984 NRHP-listed	450 Randolph Ave. 38°55′39″N 79°50′51″W	Elkins, West Virginia	Gothic Revival
Elk Branch Presbyterian Church		APRHS 117		Duffields, West Virginia	
French Creek Presbyterian Church		1866 built 1974 NRHP-listed	Rte. 2; 38°53′6″N 80°18′7″W	French Creek, West Virginia	
Glady Presbyterian Church and Manse		1905 built 2005 NRHP-listed	Jct. of Randolph Ave. and 1st St. 38°47′52″N 79°43′10″W	Glady, West Virginia	Late Gothic Revival
Gormania Presbyterian Church		1888 built 2005 NRHP-listed	Mabis Ave., 0.1 mi. S of US 50; 39°17′40″N 79°20′46″W	Gormania, West Virginia	Late Gothic Revival
Huntersville Presbyterian Church		1854, 1895-1896 built 1978 NRHP-listed	CR 21 at WV 39; 38°11′23″N 80°1′6″W	Huntersville, West Virginia	
First Presbyterian Church/Calvary Temple Evangelical Church		1894 built 1982 NRHP-listed	946 Market St. 39°16′8″N 81°33′16″W	Parkersburg, West Virginia	Romanesque, Gothic Revival
First Presbyterian Church		APRHS 211		St. Albans, West Virginia	
West Liberty Presbyterian Church		1873 built 1980 NRHP-listed	Main St. 40°10′7″N 80°35′36″W	West Liberty, West Virginia	Gothic. Park now occupies the site.
First Presbyterian Church, Wheeling				Wheeling, West Virginia	

== Wisconsin ==
Church	Image	Dates	Location	City, State	Description
First Presbyterian Church (Kenosha, Wisconsin)		founded built		Kenosha, Wisconsin	
University Presbyterian Church and Student Center		built NRHP-listed	731 State St. 43°4′29″N 89°23′55″W	Madison, Wisconsin	Late Gothic Revival
Calvary Presbyterian Church		1870 built 1986 NRHP-listed	935 W. Wisconsin Ave	Milwaukee, Wisconsin	Designed by Henry C. Koch & Julius Hess in Gothic style
Immanuel Presbyterian Church		1873 built 1974 NRHP-listed	1100 N. Astor St.	Milwaukee, Wisconsin	High Victorian Gothic style
First Presbyterian Church (Oshkosh, Wisconsin)		1893 built 1974 NRHP-listed	110 Church Ave. 44°1′14″N 88°32′19″W	Oshkosh, Wisconsin	Romanesque, Richardsonian Romanesque
Pardeeville Presbyterian Church		1865 built 1980 NRHP-listed	105 S. Main St. 43°32′7″N 89°18′8″W	Pardeeville, Wisconsin	Greek Revival
First Presbyterian Church (Racine, Wisconsin)		1852 built 1973 NRHP-listed	716 College Ave. 42°43′32″N 87°47′7″W	Racine, Wisconsin	Greek Revival
Reformed Presbyterian Church of Vernon		1853 built 1999 NRHP-listed	W234 S7710 Big Bend Road; 42°54′55″N 88°13′7″W	Vernon, Wisconsin	Greek Revival

== Wyoming ==
Church	Image	Dates	Location	City, State	Description
France Memorial United Presbyterian Church		1882 built 1984 NRHP-listed	3rd and Cedar Sts. 41°47′17″N 107°14′14″W	Rawlins, Wyoming	Gothic

== See also ==
- List of Presbyterian churches, worldwide
