= First Presbyterian Church (Champaign, Illinois) =

Coordinates: 40°07′08″N 88°14′50″W

First Presbyterian Church is the oldest church in Champaign, Illinois.

The First Presbyterian Church of Champaign, Illinois is the oldest church in Champaign.

== History ==
The history of Champaign, the University of Illinois at Urbana–Champaign and First Presbyterian Church are interlinked, even though First Presbyterian Church congregation organized 17 years prior to the University of Illinois receiving its charter. At that time, Champaign was little more than a swamp known as 'West Urbana'.

In 1867, a Presbyterian congregation of 137 erected the current sanctuary, the distinctive second floor "Upper Room" being considered a testament to their vision. In the same year the State of Illinois chartered the Illinois Industrial University (which later came to be known as the University of Illinois).

Denomination:	Presbyterian
Presbytery:	Southeastern Illinois
Synod:	Lincoln Trails

Stained glass in the Upper Room sanctuary

A brief timeline of First Presbyterian Church
1850: Eight settlers form First Presbyterian Church
1854: First church building erected at the current site of FPCC
1867: 137 members construct an "Upper Room" brick church
1907: Additions to the church facility
1933: Basement added to the church
1962: Go & Serve mission trips begin
2006: Congregation calls for a second campus in Southwest Champaign at Barkstall school
2007: Southwest Campus launches as part of a 2 campuses, 1 church model
2012: First Presbyterian Church launches Copper Creek Church as a new church development

== See also ==
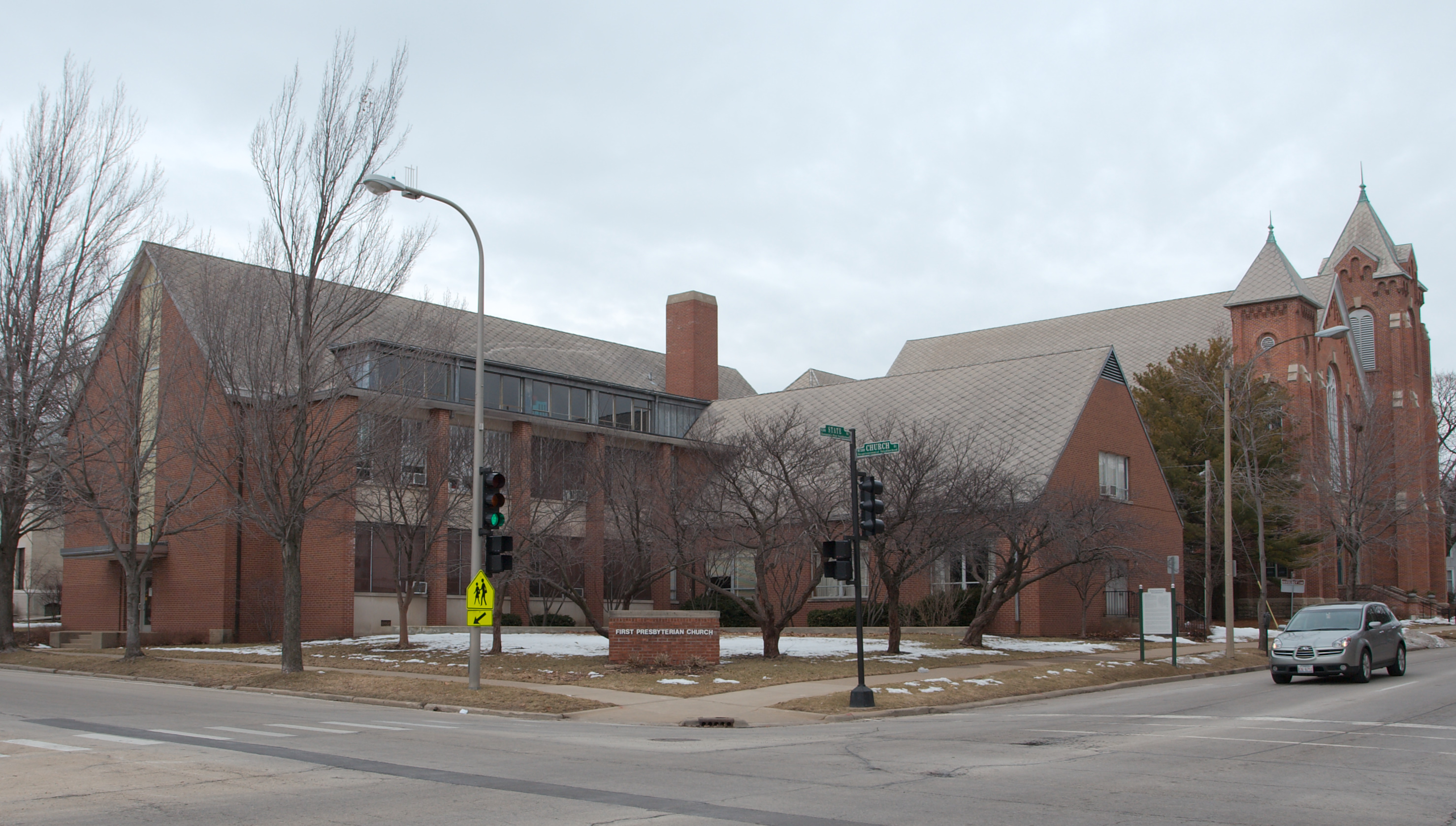
View from the southeast

- List of Presbyterian churches in the United States
