= First Presbyterian Church (Gardner, Kansas) =

Church in Kansas, United States

Coordinates: 38°48′44″N 94°55′32″W

First Presbyterian Church (FPC) of Gardner, Kansas is a PC(USA) congregation that was established in 1866. The church now occupies its third building; the first two buildings both were destroyed, one after being hit by lightning, and another due to an electrical fire.

First Presbyterian Church has a congregation of approximately 400 adult members. In addition to weekly and holiday services, the church has an active youth group, and several community outreach programs.

== See also ==
- List of Presbyterian churches in the United States
