= Sweet Hollow Presbyterian Church Parsonage =

Historic church in New York, United States

- U.S. National Register of Historic Places
- Location within New York Location within the United States
- Location: 152 Old Country Rd., Melville, New York
- Coordinates: 40°47′33″N 73°25′5″W
- Area: 1 acre (0.40 ha)
- Built: 1830
- MPS: Huntington Town MRA
- NRHP reference No.: 85002541
- Added to NRHP: September 26, 1985

Sweet Hollow Presbyterian Church Parsonage is a historic Presbyterian church parsonage at 152 Old Country Road in Melville, Suffolk County, New York. It was built about 1830 and is a 1 1/2-story, five-bay, gable-roofed residence. The church is no longer extant.

It was added to the National Register of Historic Places in 1985.
