= United Presbyterian Center =

Historic church in Kansas, United States

- U.S. National Register of Historic Places
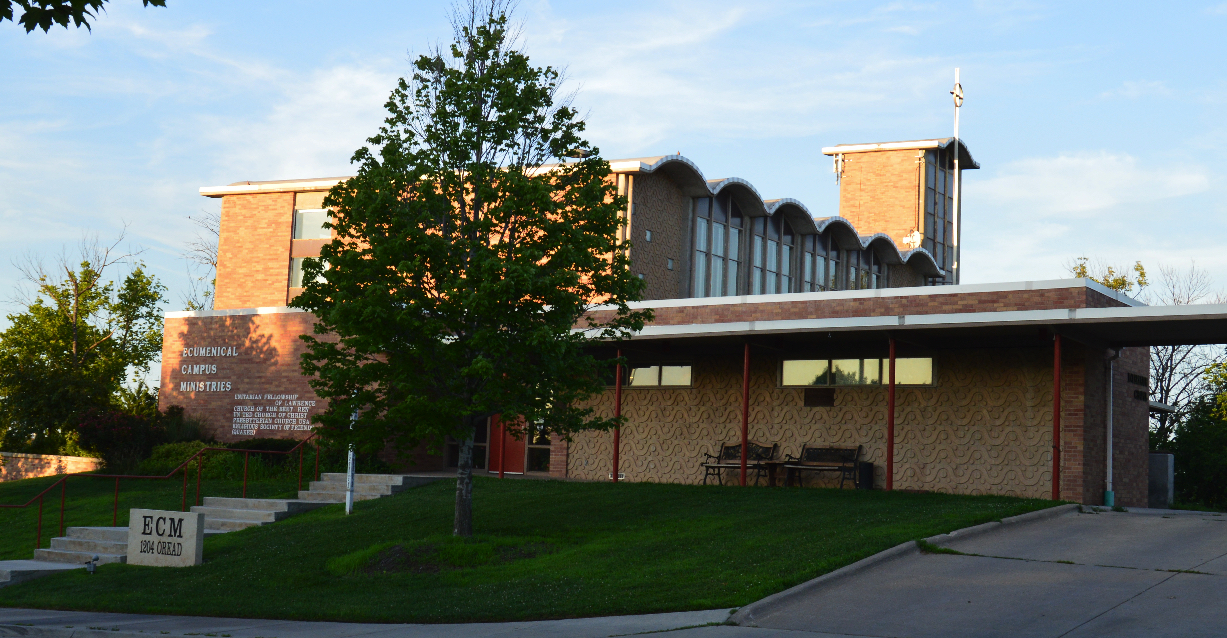
- United Presbyterian Center

- Location within Kansas Location within the United States
- Location: 1204 Oread Ave., Lawrence, Kansas
- Coordinates: 38°57′42″N 95°14′32″W
- Area: less than one acre
- Built: 1959-60
- Architect: Kiene & Bradley
- Architectural style: Modern Movement
- NRHP reference No.: 09000350
- Added to NRHP: September 29, 2009

United Presbyterian Center (also known as the Ecumenical Christian Ministries Building) is a historic Presbyterian church building at 1204 Oread Avenue in Lawrence, Kansas. It was built in 1959–60 in a Modern Movement style and was added to the National Register of Historic Places in 2009.

It was designed by Topeka architects Kiene & Bradley.
