= Old Brick Presbyterian Church =

Historic church in Alabama, United States

- U.S. National Register of Historic Places
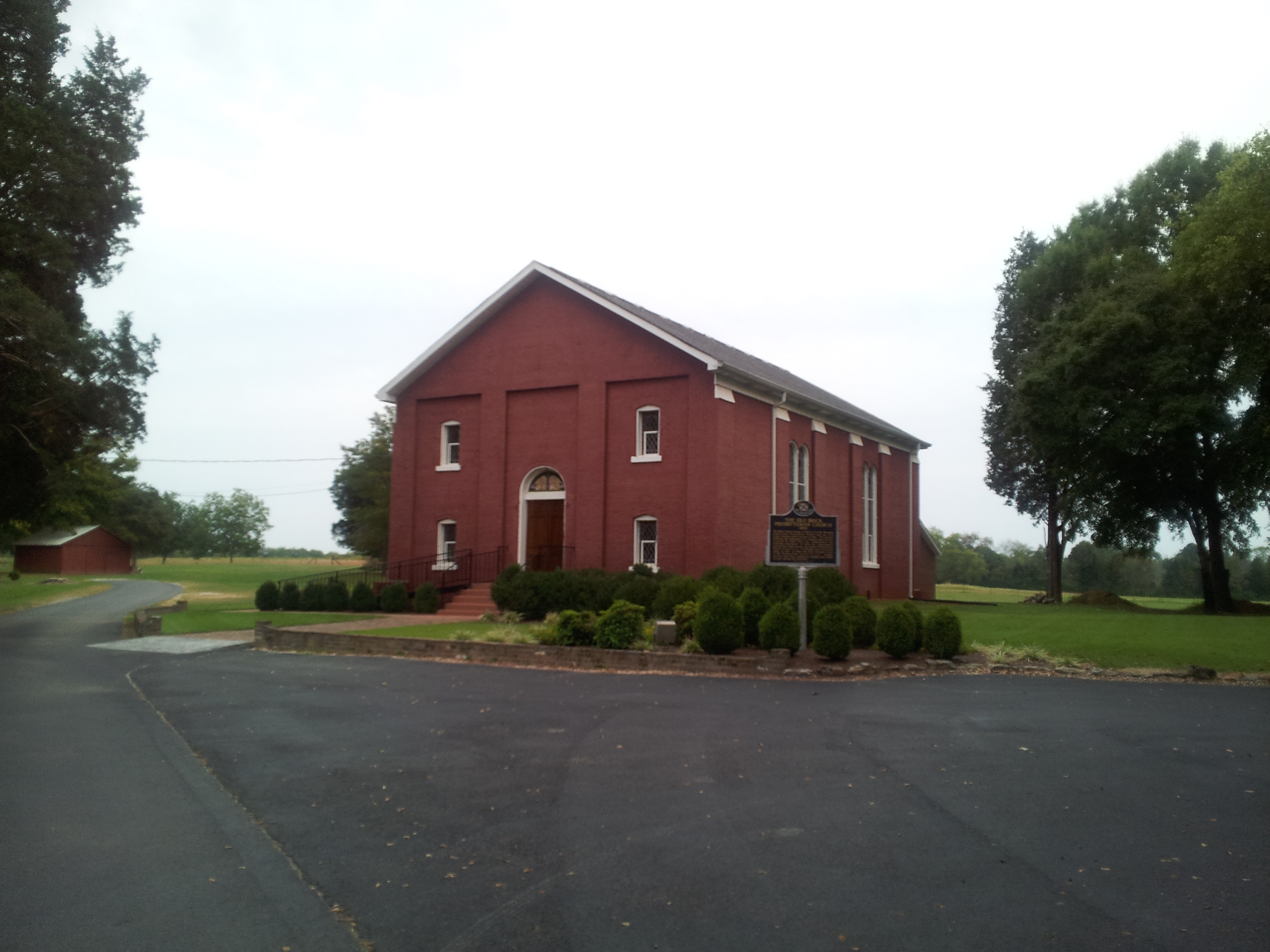
- The church in 2012

- Location within Alabama Location within the United States
- Nearest city: Muscle Shoals, Alabama
- Coordinates: 34°46′14″N 87°31′28″W
- Area: 6 acres (2.4 ha)
- Built: 1828
- Architectural style: Federal
- NRHP reference No.: 88003078
- Added to NRHP: January 9, 1989

Old Brick Presbyterian Church is a historic Presbyterian church near Muscle Shoals, Alabama, United States. The Federal style building was constructed in 1828 and added to the National Register of Historic Places in 1989.

The church's Federal-style design was largely unaltered throughout much of its history until interior and exterior alterations made in renovations which lasted from 2014 to 2016. The church's interior was altered by the complete removal of all plasterwork from the brick walls. The exterior was altered by the addition of a large cross to the front façade, a gabled shed roof over the front entrance, and a steeple on the roof, all executed in a contemporary design style.
