= Lloyd Presbyterian Church =

Historic church in North Carolina, United States

- U.S. National Register of Historic Places
- Location within North Carolina Location within the United States
- Location: 748 Chestnut St., Winston-Salem, North Carolina
- Coordinates: 36°6′13″N 80°14′33″W
- Area: less than one acre
- Built: 1900-1907
- Architectural style: Carpenter Gothic
- MPS: African-American Neighborhoods in Northeastern Winston-Salem MPS
- NRHP reference No.: 98000728
- Added to NRHP: June 26, 1998

Lloyd Presbyterian Church is a historic African-American Presbyterian church located at 748 Chestnut Street in Winston-Salem, Forsyth County, North Carolina. It was built between 1900 and 1907, and is a gable-front, rectangular frame church in the Carpenter Gothic style. It is sheathed in weatherboard and features lancet windows and a small frame steeple, with a bellcast spire and ornamental sawn eave brackets along the top of the tower.

It was listed on the National Register of Historic Places in 1998.
