= Yokena Presbyterian Church =

Historic church in Mississippi, United States

- U.S. National Register of Historic Places
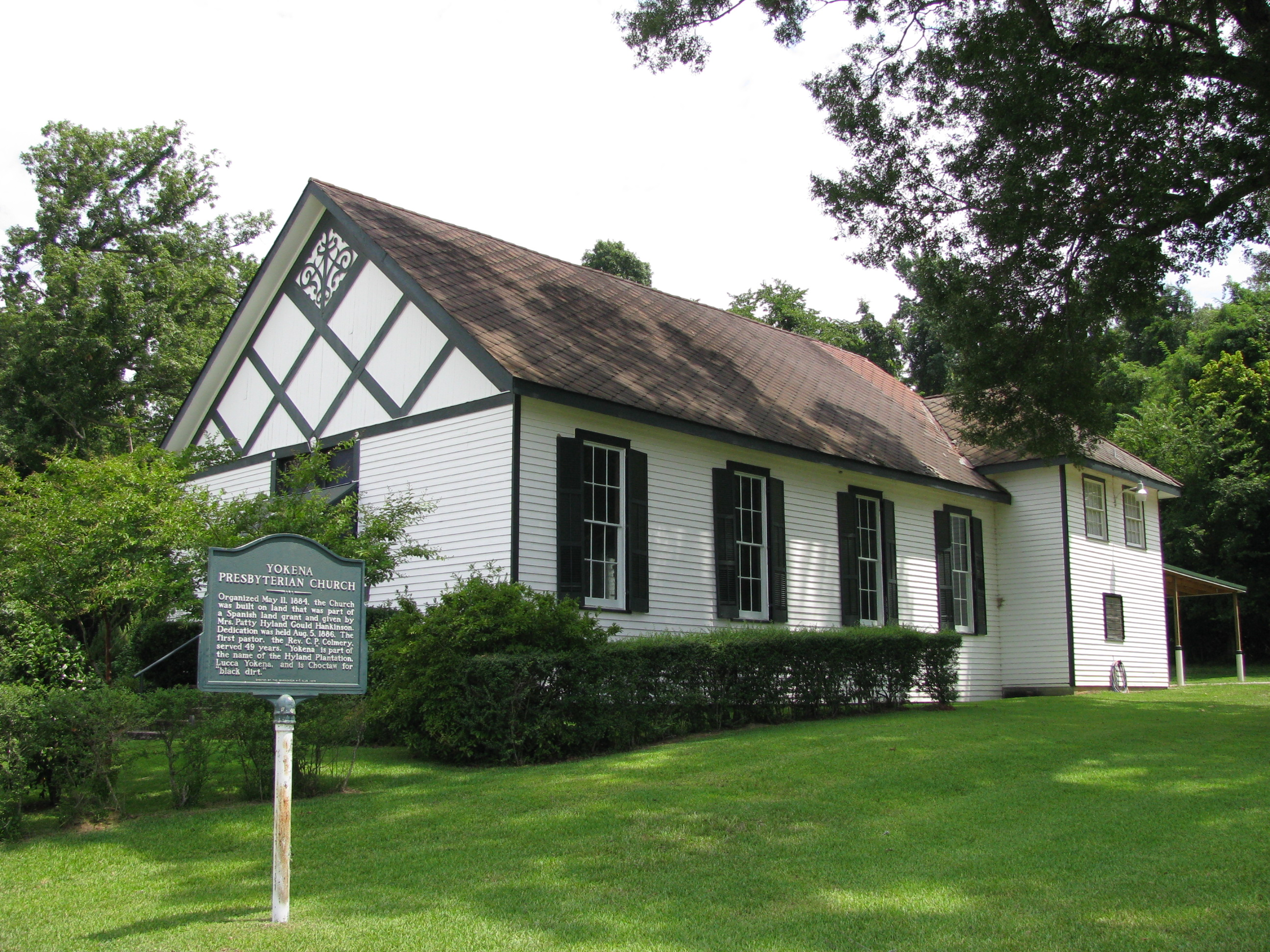
- The church in 2008

- Location within Mississippi Location within the United States
- Nearest city: Vicksburg, Mississippi
- Coordinates: 32°10′24″N 90°56′31″W
- Built: 1885
- Architect: Stanton, William
- Architectural style: Stick/Eastlake
- NRHP reference No.: 84002442
- Added to NRHP: September 7, 1984

Yokena Presbyterian Church is a Presbyterian church building near Vicksburg, Mississippi. It was built in 1885 and added to the National Register of Historic Places in 1984.
