= Presbyterian Church Parsonage (Flagstaff, Arizona) =

- U.S. National Register of Historic Places
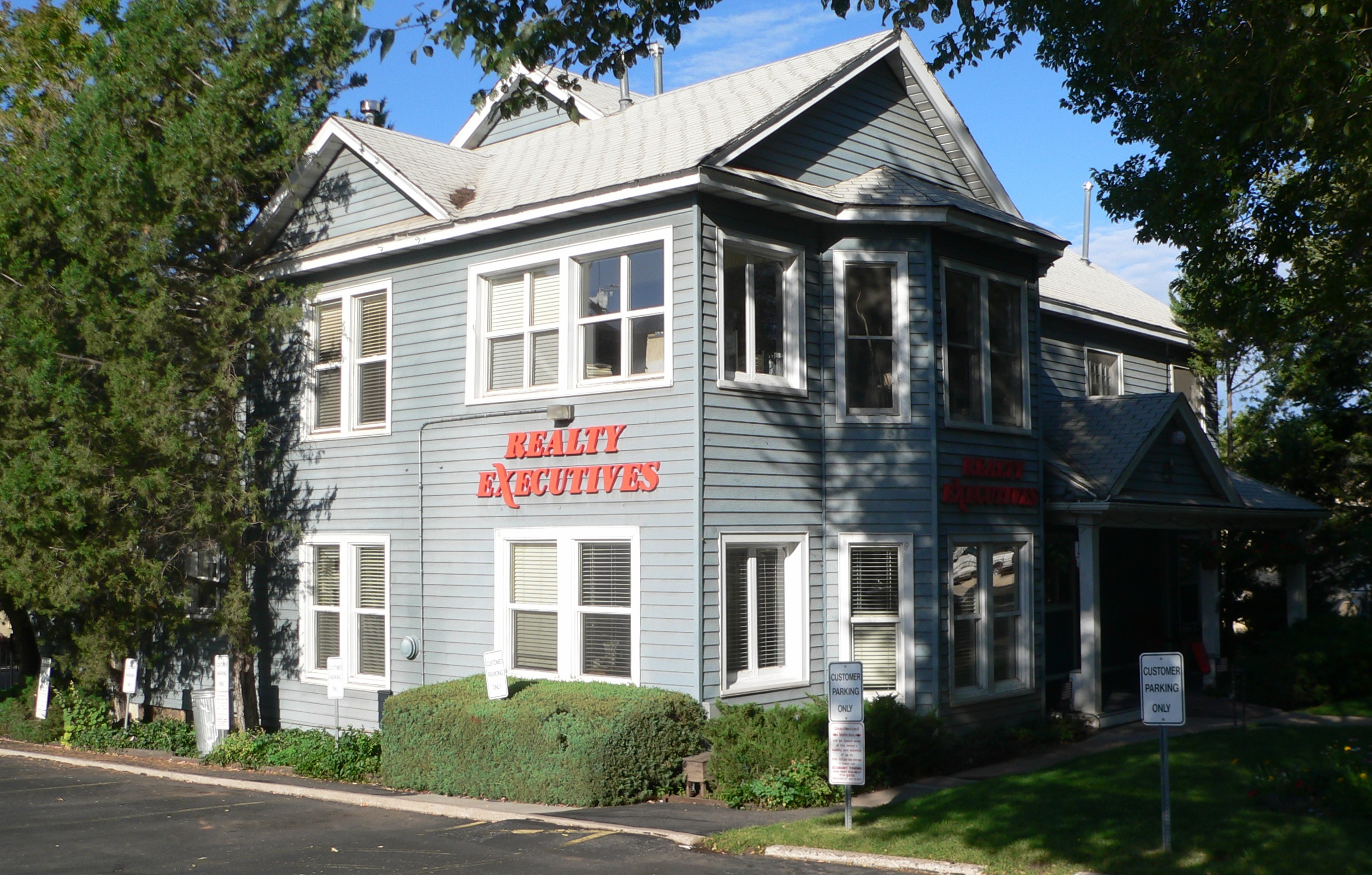

- Location within Arizona Location within the United States
- Location: 15 E. Cherry, Flagstaff, Arizona
- Coordinates: 35°11′59″N 111°38′47″W
- Area: less than one acre
- Built: 1893
- Architectural style: Queen Anne
- MPS: Flagstaff MRA
- NRHP reference No.: 86000911
- Added to NRHP: April 30, 1986

Presbyterian Church Parsonage is a historic Presbyterian church parsonage at 15 E. Cherry in Flagstaff, Arizona.

It was built in a Queen Anne style and was added to the National Register in 1986.
