= Rankin Presbyterian Church =

Historic church in Colorado, United States

- U.S. National Register of Historic Places
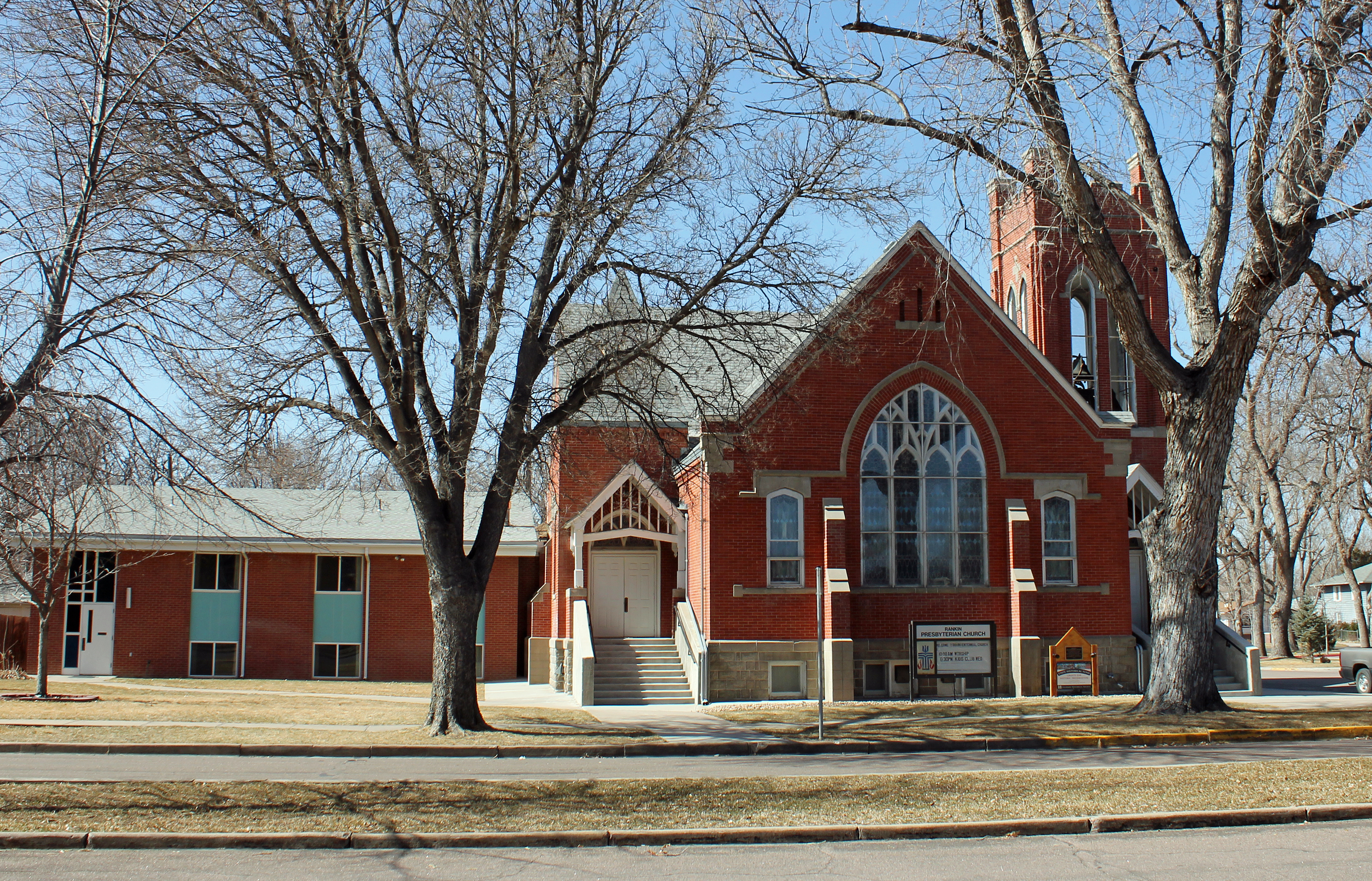

- Location within Colorado Location within the United States
- Location: 420 Clayton St., Brush, Colorado
- Coordinates: 40°15′30″N 103°37′23″W
- Area: less than one acre
- Built: 1907
- Architect: Sweetland, Henry Hale
- Architectural style: Late Gothic Revival
- NRHP reference No.: 07000696
- Added to NRHP: July 18, 2007

Rankin Presbyterian Church is a historic church at 420 Clayton Street in Brush, Colorado.

It was built in 1907 and was added to the National Register in 2007. In 1963, an educational wing was added to the southwest corner of the building.
