= First Presbyterian Church =

First Presbyterian Church (and variations such as Old First Presbyterian Church or First Presbyterian Church and Rectory) may refer to:

== Canada ==
- First Presbyterian Church (Edmonton), Alberta

== Thailand ==
- First Presbyterian Church, Samray, in Bangkok

== United States ==
=== Alabama ===
- First Presbyterian Church (Birmingham, Alabama)
- First Presbyterian Church (Eutaw, Alabama)
- First Presbyterian Church (Greenville, Alabama)
- First Presbyterian Church (Jacksonville, Alabama)
- First Presbyterian Church (Talladega, Alabama)
- First Presbyterian Church of Wetumpka

=== Arizona ===
- First Presbyterian Church of Florence
- First Presbyterian Church (Phoenix, Arizona)

=== Arkansas ===
- First Presbyterian Church (Clarksville, Arkansas)
- First Presbyterian Church (Dardanelle, Arkansas)
  - Berry House (Dardanelle, Arkansas), the previous building used by the church
- First Presbyterian Church (DeQueen, Arkansas)
- First Presbyterian Church (Des Arc, Arkansas)
- First Presbyterian Church (El Dorado, Arkansas)
- First Presbyterian Church (Fordyce, Arkansas)
- First Presbyterian Church (Heber Springs, Arkansas)
- First Presbyterian Church (Hot Springs, Arkansas)
- First Presbyterian Church (Little Rock, Arkansas)
- First Presbyterian Church (Lonoke, Arkansas)
- First Presbyterian Church (Nashville, Arkansas)
- First Presbyterian Church (Newport, Arkansas)
- First Presbyterian Church Manse (North Little Rock, Arkansas)
- First Presbyterian Church (Stamps, Arkansas)

=== California ===
- First Presbyterian Church Sanctuary Building, in Alameda, California
- First Presbyterian Church of Hollywood, Los Angeles, California
- First Presbyterian Church (Napa, California)
- First Presbyterian Church of Oakland
- First Presbyterian Church of San Jose
- First Presbyterian Church (San Luis Obispo, California)
- First Presbyterian Church (Vallejo, California)

=== Colorado ===
- First Presbyterian Church (Canon City, Colorado)
- First Presbyterian Church (Colorado Springs, Colorado)
- Eckert Presbyterian Church or First Presbyterian Church
- First Presbyterian Church of Golden and Unger House, in Golden, Colorado
- First Presbyterian Church of Ramah

=== Connecticut ===
- Fish Church or First Presbyterian Church of Stamford

=== Delaware ===
- Old First Presbyterian Church (Newark, Delaware)
- Old First Presbyterian Church (Wilmington, Delaware)

=== Florida ===
- First Presbyterian Church (Lynn Haven, Florida)
- First Presbyterian Church Archeological Site
- First Presbyterian Church (Miami, Florida)
- First Presbyterian Church (Tallahassee, Florida)

=== Georgia ===
- First Presbyterian Church of Atlanta
- First Presbyterian Church (Augusta, Georgia)
- First Presbyterian Church (Cartersville, Georgia)
- First Presbyterian Church (Columbus, Georgia)
- First Presbyterian Church (Macon, Georgia)
- First Presbyterian Church (Tifton, Georgia), contributing in Tifton Residential Historic District
- First Presbyterian Church (Valdosta, Georgia)

=== Idaho ===
- First Presbyterian Church (Idaho Falls, Idaho)
- First Presbyterian Church (Kamiah, Idaho)
- First Presbyterian Church (Lapwai, Idaho)

=== Illinois ===
- First Presbyterian Church (Champaign, Illinois)
- First Presbyterian Church (Springfield, Illinois)
- First Presbyterian Church (Vandalia, Illinois)

=== Indiana ===
- First Presbyterian Church (Aurora, Indiana)
- First Presbyterian Church (Hartford City, Indiana)
- First Presbyterian Church (Seymour, Indiana)
- First Presbyterian Church (South Bend, Indiana)

=== Iowa ===
- First Presbyterian Church (Davenport, Iowa)
- First Presbyterian Church (Marion, Iowa)
- First Presbyterian Church (Muscatine, Iowa)
- First Presbyterian Church (West Bend, Iowa)

=== Kansas ===
- First Presbyterian Church of Abilene
- First Presbyterian Church (Gardner, Kansas)
- First Presbyterian Church (Girard, Kansas)
- First Presbyterian Church (Hays, Kansas)
- First Presbyterian Church, Leavenworth

=== Kentucky ===
- First Presbyterian Church (Ashland, Kentucky)
- First Presbyterian Church (Danville, Kentucky)
- First Presbyterian Church (Elizabethtown, Kentucky)
- First Presbyterian Church (Flemingsburg, Kentucky)
- First Presbyterian Church (Glasgow, Kentucky)
- First Presbyterian Church (Lexington, Kentucky)

=== Louisiana ===
- First Presbyterian Church (Ruston, Louisiana)
- First Presbyterian Church (Shreveport, Louisiana), a National Register of Historic Places listing in Caddo Parish, Louisiana

=== Maryland ===
- First Presbyterian Church and Manse (Baltimore, Maryland)

=== Massachusetts ===
- First Presbyterian Church (Newburyport, Massachusetts)

=== Michigan ===
- First Presbyterian Church of Blissfield
- First Presbyterian Church (Cass City, Michigan)
- First Presbyterian Church (Coldwater, Michigan)
- First Presbyterian Church (Detroit, Michigan)
- Saline First Presbyterian Church

=== Minnesota ===
- First Presbyterian Church (Hastings, Minnesota)
- First Presbyterian Church (Mankato, Minnesota)

=== Mississippi ===
- Old First Presbyterian Church (Kosciusko, Mississippi)
- First Presbyterian Church of Meridian
- First Presbyterian Church of Natchez
- First Presbyterian Church (Jackson, Mississippi)

=== Missouri ===
- First Presbyterian Church (Keytesville, Missouri)
- First Presbyterian Church (La Grange, Missouri)
- First Presbyterian Church (Marshall, Missouri)

=== Montana ===
- First Presbyterian Church (Bozeman, Montana)
- First Presbyterian Church (Deer Lodge, Montana), in Deer Lodge Central Business Historic District, designed by Beezer Brothers
- First Presbyterian Church and Manse (Forsyth, Montana)
- First Presbyterian Church (Lewistown, Montana)
- First Presbyterian Church of Whitefish

=== Nebraska ===
- First Presbyterian Church (Spalding, Nebraska)

=== Nevada ===
- First Presbyterian Church (Virginia City, Nevada), a church in the Virginia City Historic District

=== New Jersey ===
- First Presbyterian Church of Elizabeth
- First Church of Hanover or First Presbyterian Church of Hanover, in Livingston, New Jersey
- First Presbyterian Church (Morristown, New Jersey)
- First Presbyterian Church (New Brunswick, New Jersey)
- Old First Presbyterian Church (Newark, New Jersey) or First Presbyterian Church and Cemetery
- First Presbyterian Church of Rumson
- First Presbyterian Church (Trenton, New Jersey)
- First Presbyterian Church of Wantage, in Sussex, New Jersey
- First Presbyterian Church of Orange, New Jersey

=== New York ===
- First Presbyterian Church (Batavia, New York)
- First Presbyterian Church (Brockport, New York)
- First Presbyterian Church (Brooklyn), part of the Brooklyn Heights Historic District
- First Presbyterian Church (Buffalo, New York)
- First Presbyterian Church of Chester
- First Presbyterian Church Complex (Cortland, New York)
- First Presbyterian Church (Delhi, New York)
- First Presbyterian Church (Dundee, New York)
- First Presbyterian Church of Avon (East Avon, New York)
- First Presbyterian Church of Far Rockaway
- First Presbyterian Church (Glens Falls, New York)
- First Presbyterian Church (Gouverneur, New York)
- Sparta First Presbyterian Church (Groveland Station, New York)
- First Presbyterian Church of Hector
- United Methodist Church of the Highlands or First Presbyterian Church of Highland Falls
- First Presbyterian Church in Jamaica
- First Presbyterian Church (Manhattan)
- First Presbyterian Church of Marcellus
- First Presbyterian Church of Margaretville
- First Presbyterian Church of Mumford
- First Presbyterian Church and Lewis Pintard House (New Rochelle, New York)
- First Presbyterian Church (Niagara Falls, New York)
- First Presbyterian Church of Ontario Center
- First Presbyterian Church of Oyster Bay
- First Presbyterian Church (Plattsburgh, New York)
- First Presbyterian Church of Dailey Ridge (Potsdam, New York)
- First Presbyterian Church (Poughkeepsie, New York)
- First Presbyterian Church Rectory (Poughkeepsie, New York)
- First Presbyterian Church (Preble, New York)
- First Presbyterian Church (Rochester, New York)
- First Presbyterian Church (Sag Harbor, New York)
- First Presbyterian Church (Smithtown, New York)
- First Presbyterian Church (Spencer, New York)
- First Presbyterian Church of Ulysses (Trumansburg, New York)
- First Presbyterian Church of Tuscarora
- First Presbyterian Church (Utica, New York)
- First Presbyterian Church (Valatie, New York)
- First Presbyterian Church (Yorktown, New York)
- First Presbyterian Church (Waterloo, New York)

=== North Carolina ===
- First Presbyterian Church (Charlotte, North Carolina)
- First Presbyterian Church (Durham, North Carolina)
- First Presbyterian Church (Fayetteville, North Carolina)
- First Presbyterian Church (Franklin, North Carolina)
- First Presbyterian Church (Goldsboro, North Carolina)
- First Presbyterian Church (Hickory, North Carolina)
- First Presbyterian Church (Highlands, North Carolina)
- First Presbyterian Church (Lincolnton, North Carolina)
- First Presbyterian Church (Marion, North Carolina)
- First Presbyterian Church and Churchyard, in New Bern, North Carolina
- First Presbyterian Church (Wilmington, North Carolina)

=== North Dakota ===
- First Presbyterian Church of Steele

=== Ohio ===
- Covenant First Presbyterian Church, in Cincinnati, Ohio
- First Presbyterian Church of Maumee Chapel
- First Presbyterian Church (Napoleon, Ohio)
- First Presbyterian Church (Portsmouth, Ohio)
- First Presbyterian Church (Troy, Ohio)
- First Presbyterian Church of Wapakoneta

=== Oklahoma ===
- First Presbyterian Church (Atoka, Oklahoma)
- First Presbyterian Church of Chandler
- First Presbyterian Church of Coweta
- First Presbyterian Church of Lawton
- First Presbyterian Church (McAlester, Oklahoma)
- First Presbyterian Church (Sallisaw, Oklahoma)
- First Presbyterian Church of Tonkawa
- First Presbyterian Church (Tulsa)
- First Presbyterian Church (Waurika, Oklahoma)

=== Oregon ===
- First Presbyterian Church (Cottage Grove, Oregon)
- First Presbyterian Church (Portland, Oregon)
- First Presbyterian Church of Redmond
- First Presbyterian Church (Roseburg, Oregon)

=== Pennsylvania ===
- First Presbyterian Church (Bethlehem, Pennsylvania)
- First Presbyterian Church (Philadelphia, Pennsylvania)
- First Presbyterian Church 1793, in Washington, Pennsylvania
- First Presbyterian Church of West Chester
- First Presbyterian Church (Pittsburgh)

=== South Carolina ===
- First Presbyterian Church (Columbia, South Carolina)
- First Presbyterian Church (Rock Hill, South Carolina)
- First Presbyterian Church of Woodruff

=== South Dakota ===
- First Presbyterian Church of Langford

=== Tennessee ===
- First Presbyterian Church (Chattanooga, Tennessee)
- First Presbyterian Church (Clarksville, Tennessee)
- First Presbyterian Church Manse (Clarksville, Tennessee)
- First Presbyterian Church (Cleveland, Tennessee)
- First Presbyterian Church of Clifton
- First Presbyterian Church (Cookeville, Tennessee), a National Register of Historic Places listing in Putnam County, Tennessee
- First Presbyterian Church, 403 South Main Street, Covington, Tennessee, contributing in South Main Street Historic District (Covington, Tennessee)
- First Presbyterian Church (Greeneville, Tennessee)
- First Presbyterian Church Cemetery, in Knoxville, Tennessee
- First Presbyterian Church (McMinnville, Tennessee)
- First Presbyterian Church (Memphis, Tennessee)
- First Presbyterian Church (Murfreesboro, Tennessee)
- Downtown Presbyterian Church (Nashville)
- First Presbyterian Church of Pulaski
- First Presbyterian Church (Shelbyville, Tennessee)
- First Presbyterian Church (Sweetwater, Tennessee)

=== Texas ===
- First Presbyterian Church (Abilene, Texas)
- First Presbyterian Church of Dallas
- First Presbyterian Church (Galveston, Texas)
- First Presbyterian Church (Houston, Texas)
- First Presbyterian Church (Mineral Wells, Texas)
- First Presbyterian Church (Orange, Texas)
- First Presbyterian Church (Palestine, Texas)
- First Presbyterian Church (Paris, Texas)
- First Presbyterian Church (San Angelo, Texas)
- First Presbyterian Church (Van Horn, Texas)

=== Utah ===
- First Presbyterian Church of Salt Lake City

=== Virginia ===
- First Presbyterian Church (Arlington, Virginia)

=== Washington ===
- First Presbyterian Church (Tacoma, Washington)

=== West Virginia ===
- First Presbyterian Church, in Huntington, West Virginia
- First Presbyterian Church/Calvary Temple Evangelical Church, in Parkersburg, West Virginia

=== Wisconsin ===
- First Presbyterian Church (Oshkosh, Wisconsin)
- First Presbyterian Church (Racine, Wisconsin)

== See also ==
- List of Presbyterian churches
