= First Presbyterian Church Manse =

First Presbyterian Church Manse or First Presbyterian Church and Manse may refer to:
(sorted by state, then city/town)

- First Presbyterian Church Manse (North Little Rock, Arkansas), listed on the National Register of Historic Places (NRHP) in Pulaski County, Arkansas
- First Presbyterian Church and Manse (Baltimore, Maryland), listed on the NRHP in Baltimore, Maryland
- First Presbyterian Church and Manse (Forsyth, Montana), listed on the NRHP in Rosebud County, Montana
- First Presbyterian Church Manse (Clarksville, Tennessee), listed on the NRHP in Montgomery County, Tennessee

See also

- First Presbyterian Manse (Niagara Falls, New York), listed on the National Register of Historic Places (NRHP) in Niagara County, New York
