= First Presbyterian Church (Florence, Arizona) =

Historic church in Arizona, United States

- First Presbyterian Church of Florence
- U.S. National Register of Historic Places
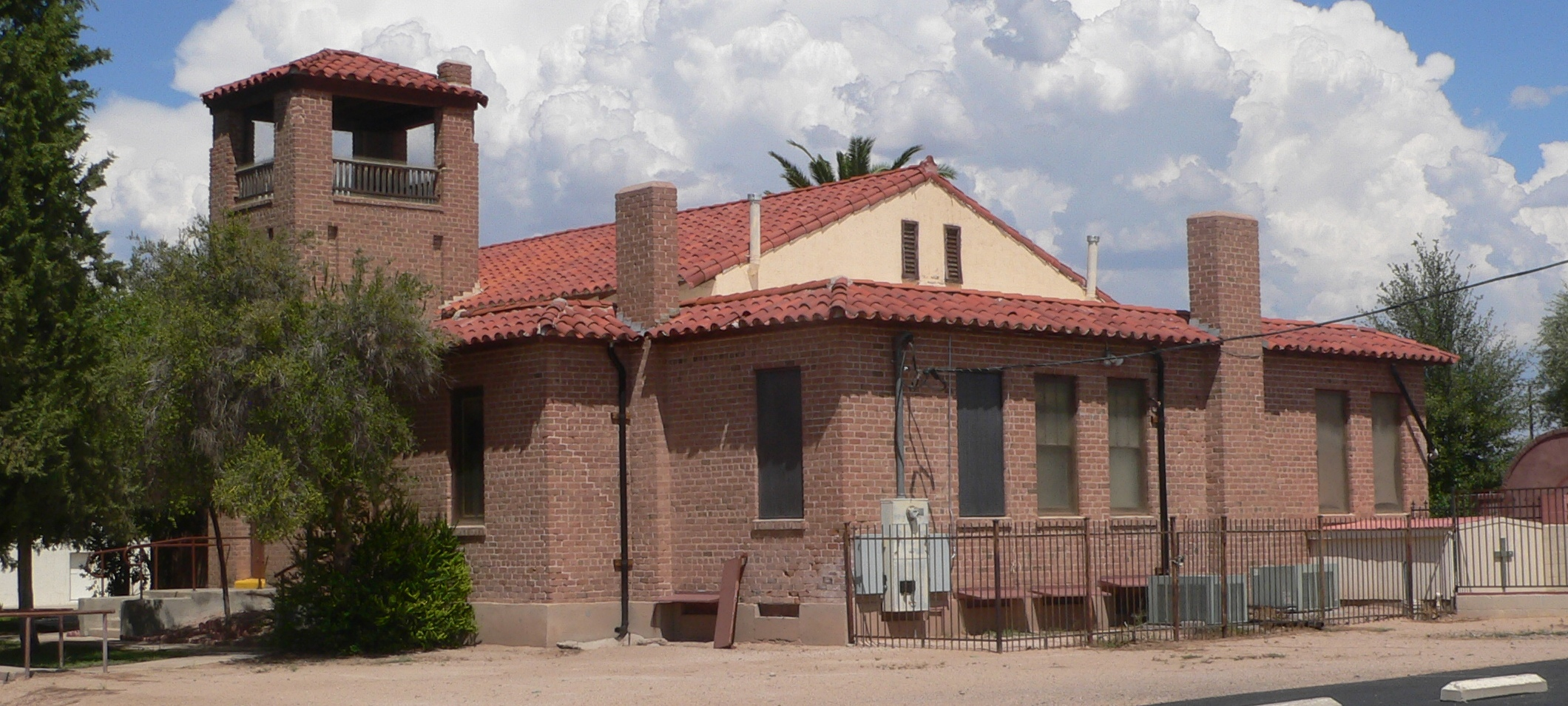
- View from southwest

- Location within Arizona Location within the United States
- Location: 225 East Butte Avenur; Florence, Arizona
- Coordinates: 33°1′51.6″N 111°23′6.2″W
- Area: less than one acre
- Built: 1931
- Architect: Wallingford & Bell
- Architectural style: Mission/Spanish Revival
- NRHP reference No.: 94000573
- Added to NRHP: June 10, 1994

Desert Hope Presbyterian Church (formerly The First Presbyterian Church of Florence), at 225 East Butte Avenue in Florence, Arizona, was built in 1931. It was designed by Wallingford & Bell in Mission/Spanish Revival style. It was listed on the National Register of Historic Places in 1994.

In 2012, the congregation had 64 members.
