= First Presbyterian Church (West Bend, Iowa) =

- U.S. National Register of Historic Places
- Location within Iowa Location within the United States
- Location: 101 1st Ave. SW. West Bend, Iowa
- Coordinates: 42°57′34.1″N 94°26′48.2″W
- Area: less than one acre
- Built: 1889
- Architectural style: Late Victorian
- NRHP reference No.: 10000276
- Added to NRHP: May 24, 2010

First Presbyterian Church, also known as First United Presbyterian Church, Templar Lodge No. 514, and the West Bend Historical Museum, is a historic building located in West Bend, Iowa, United States. The first recorded Protestant services in town were led by a Presbyterian minister, the Rev. David S. McComb in 1851. First Presbyterian Church was chartered on December 23, 1883, with 11 members. The Rev. Harvey S. Dickey served as their first pastor. They initially worshiped in homes until they built this church building in 1889. An addition was constructed onto the rear of the building in 1915 as the congregation grew. They continued to worship here until 1972 when lack of numbers forced them to dissolve. Templar Lodge No.514 took over the building at that point and used it until December 14, 1977. The West Bend Historical Society acquired the building and used it for a museum from 1981 until 2007.

The building is considered a rare example of a wood-frame Late Victorian church. The exterior suggests a vernacular form created by a local craftsman. It utilizes religious symbolism as decorative elements, such as the triangular hoods on the windows and doors that refer to the Holy Trinity. The narthex on the interior reflects the Victorian period of its construction, while the sanctuary reflects the Classical influences popular when the 1915 addition was constructed. The building was listed on the National Register of Historic Places in 2010.
