= First Presbyterian Church of Lawton =

Historic church in Oklahoma, United States

- U.S. National Register of Historic Places
- Location within Oklahoma Location within the United States
- Location: 13th and A Ave., Lawton, Oklahoma
- Coordinates: 34°36′13″N 98°23′58″W
- Area: 0.2 acres (0.081 ha)
- Built: 1902, 1946
- Architectural style: Late Gothic Revival
- NRHP reference No.: 79001990
- Added to NRHP: December 14, 1979

The First Presbyterian Church of Lawton is at 1302 SW A Avenue in Lawton, Oklahoma. Sunday Morning Worship Services are at 10:45 a.m. All Are Welcone.
