= First Presbyterian Church of Oakland =

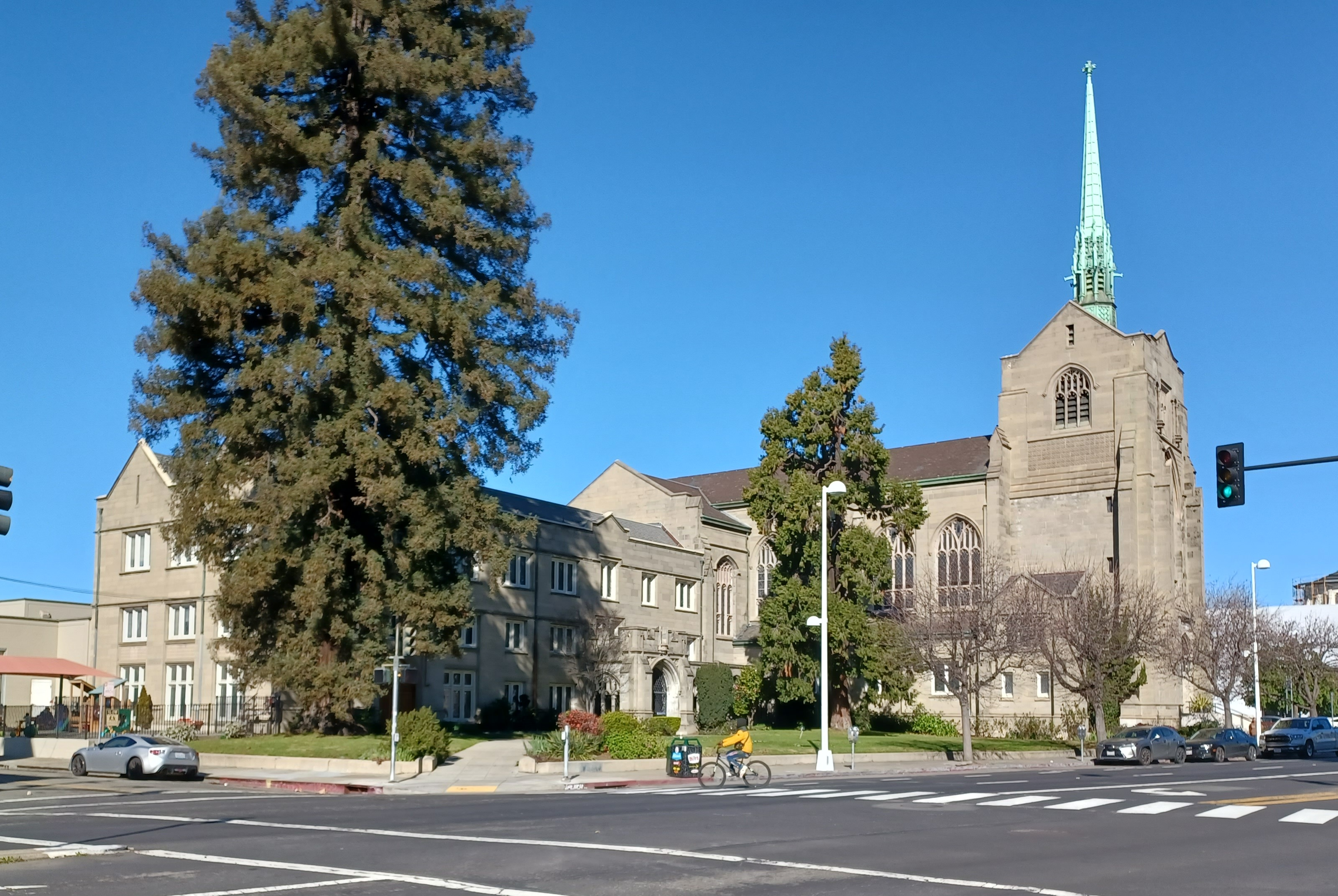

- Location within California
- 37.81547°N 122.26493°W
- Location: 2619 Broadway; Oakland, California
- Country: United States of America
- Denomination: Presbyterian
- Website: www.firstchurchoakland.org

History
- Founded: March 1853

Architecture
- Architectural type: Early English Gothic Revival
- Completed: 1914

Specifications
- Capacity: 725

Clergy
- Pastor: Matt Prinz

The First Presbyterian Church of Oakland is a historic church founded in 1853 in Oakland, California. It is a part of the Presbyterian Church (USA).

First Presbyterian Church was the first Christian church in Oakland.

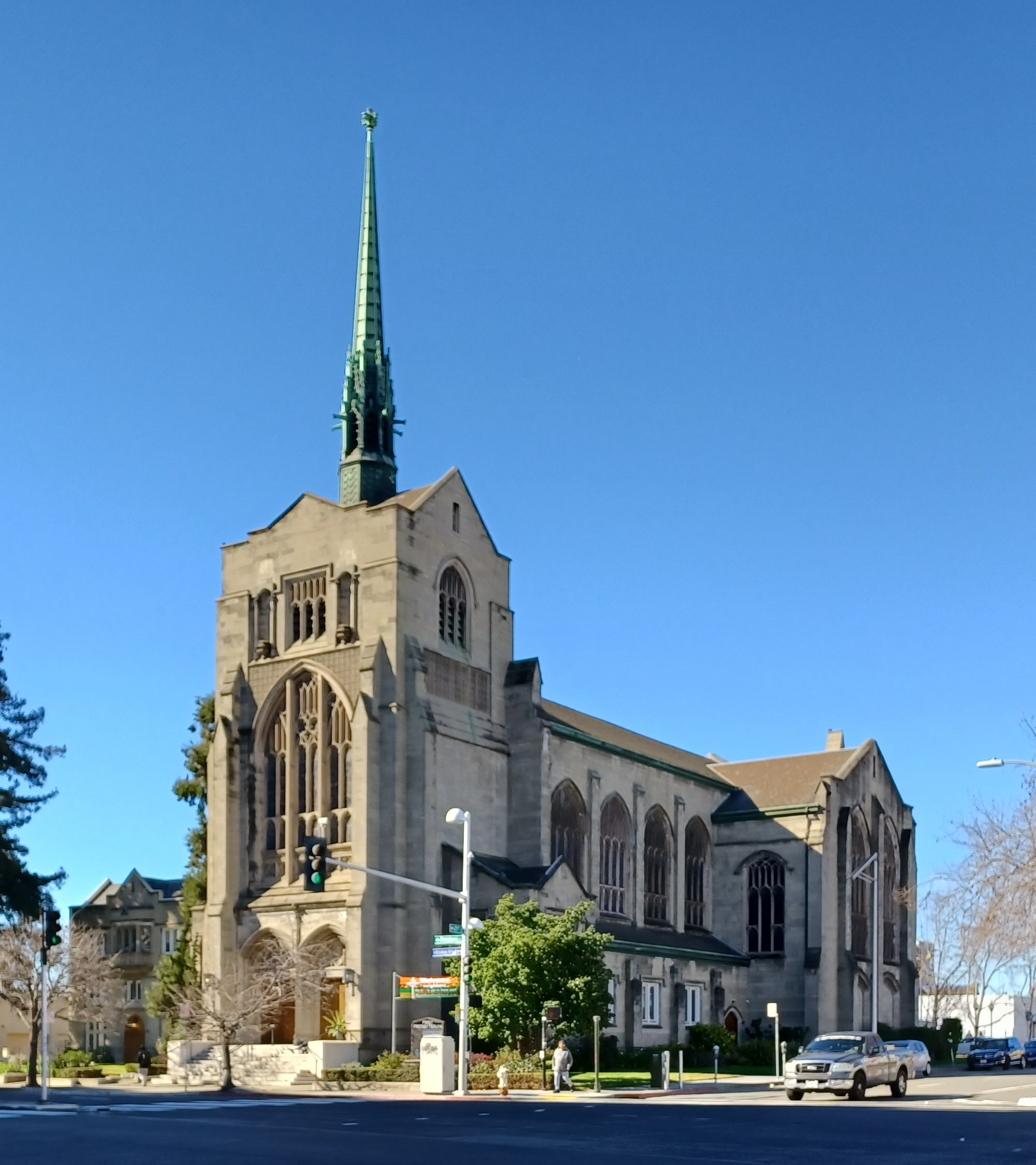
First Presbyterian Church of Oakland
