= First Presbyterian Church (Clarksville, Tennessee) =

Historic church in Tennessee, United States

- U.S. National Register of Historic Places
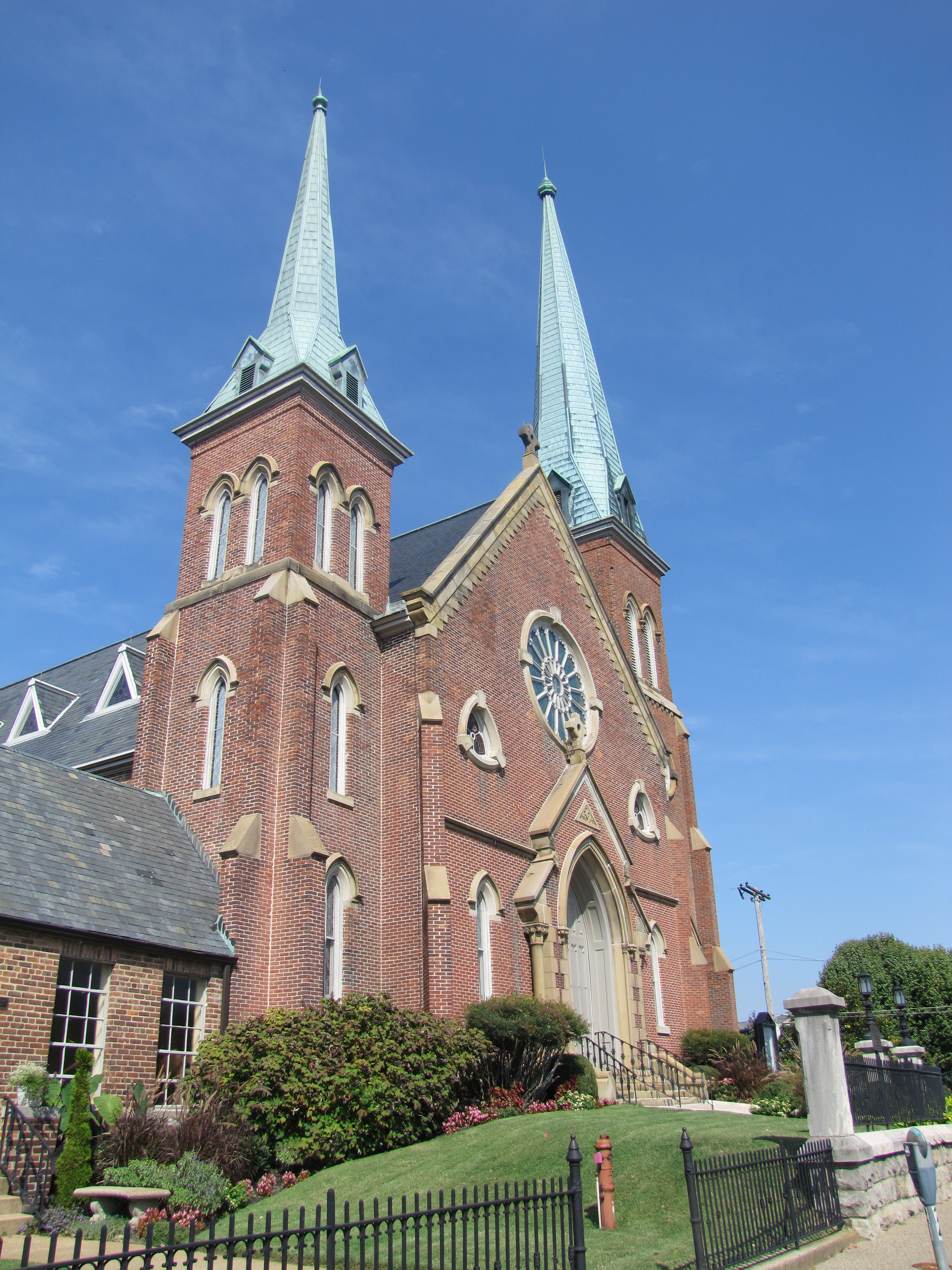

- Location within Tennessee Location within the United States
- Location: 213 Main St., Clarksville, Tennessee
- Coordinates: 36°31′45″N 87°21′31″W
- Area: 1 acre (0.40 ha)
- Built: 1876
- Architectural style: Gothic
- MPS: Nineteenth Century Churches in Clarksville TR (AD)
- NRHP reference No.: 76001793
- Added to NRHP: April 30, 1976

First Presbyterian Church is a historic church at 213 Main Street in Clarksville, Tennessee. The congregation is currently affiliated with the Presbyterian Church (USA).

== History ==
Clarksville was incorporated in 1784 and by the early eighteenth century was a village of forty families. Dr. Gideon Blackburn, an itinerant Presbyterian minister, preached outdoors in a place south of Clarksville called Tompkins Grove. He organized First Presbyterian Church on May 25, 1822. The first congregation of fourteen initially worshipped in private homes and later in the new brick Court House on the downtown square. The Court House served as the meeting place for the church for almost 20 years. By 1835 the congregation had outgrown that venue, and worshippers wanted their own church building. They raised $2,300, and Lucinda Elder donated land at the present site of Third and Main Streets. In 1840 the first church building opened and, by 1844, the membership had reached 120.

As the congregation continued to grow it became obvious a new larger structure was needed. Under the direction of Dr. J.B. Luton, minister from 1872 to 1897, the old walls were removed to make way for a neo-gothic building of pressed brick and stone. The new church housed a sanctuary with stained glass windows which included a beautiful rose window, the pews, pulpit, communion table and chandeliers, all featuring Christian symbols. Below the sanctuary was a lecture hall. In 1876 the cornerstone was laid, and two years later the building was completed for $43,285.15.

First Presbyterian was part of the Southwestern Presbyterian University until that school moved to Memphis in 1925. The university provided ministers when the regular pastors were absent. Ministerial students from the university often taught Sunday school. The church benefited from this rich intellectual connection.

By 1950 once again First Presbyterian needed to expand and included construction of the Education Building and the chapel on the west side of the 1878 sanctuary. During the 1960s, rooms were added to the north end of the education building, and the sanctuary underwent a significant renovation including air conditioning. Additionally, the kitchen was remodeled and the Memorial Garden created.

Reverend George Gracey became the pastor in 1974 and served First Presbyterian for over 30 years. With much admiration and respect, the congregation bestowed the honor of Pastor Emeritus on Reverend Gracey in 2009, the only time in its history. Beginning in 1990, the congregation began a capital campaign to address not only church needs but important community needs as well. While the extensive renovations to the church were being completed the church met at the American Legion Building. By June 1992 the congregation returned to the beautiful sanctuary. In 1993 the congregation voted to purchase the old Clarksville City Street Department at 215 Foster Street, near the church. In 1996 the church voted to use this location to build the Activities and Outreach Center. The AOC has a basketball court, Sunday school rooms, a Boy Scout meeting room, and a kitchen and dining area. It houses Loaves and Fishes, which today serves over 50,000 meals annually.
