= First Presbyterian Church (Spalding, Nebraska) =

Historic church in Nebraska, United States

- U.S. National Register of Historic Places
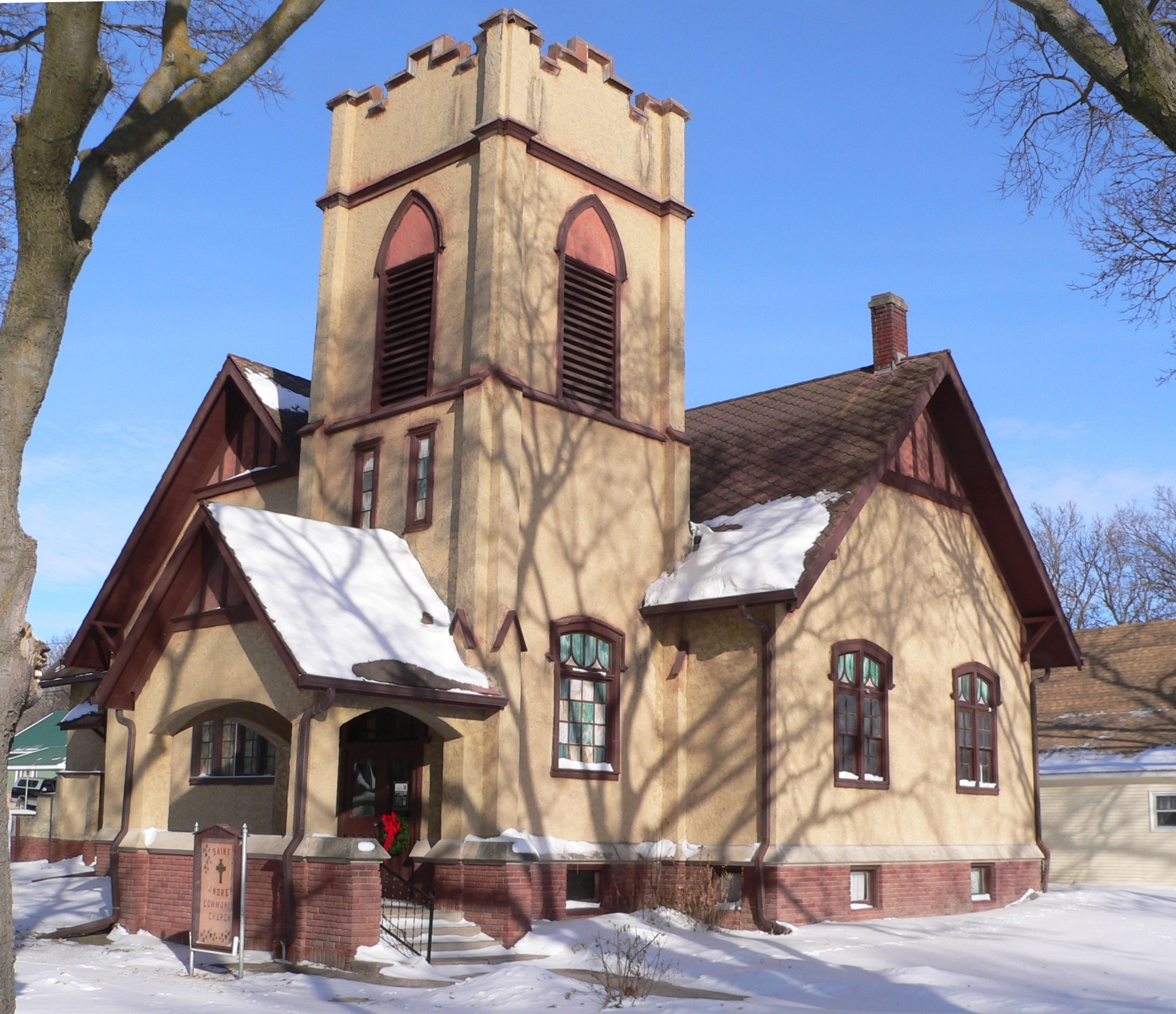

- Location within Nebraska Location within the United States
- Location: 260 S. Pine St., Spalding, Nebraska
- Coordinates: 41°41′13″N 98°21′31″W
- Area: less than one acre
- Built: 1904; 1921
- Architect: Grabe and Helleberg
- Architectural style: Tudor Revival
- NRHP reference No.: 04000292
- Added to NRHP: April 14, 2004

First Presbyterian Church is a historic church at 260 S. Pine Street in Spalding, Nebraska. It has also been known as St. Andrew Community Church.

Extending out from a 1904 church building, the current building was designed in Tudor Revival style by architects Grabe and Helleberg and was built in 1921.

It was added to the National Register in 2004.
