= First Presbyterian Church (Portsmouth, Ohio) =

Historic church in Ohio, United States

- U.S. National Register of Historic Places
- U.S. Historic district – Contributing property
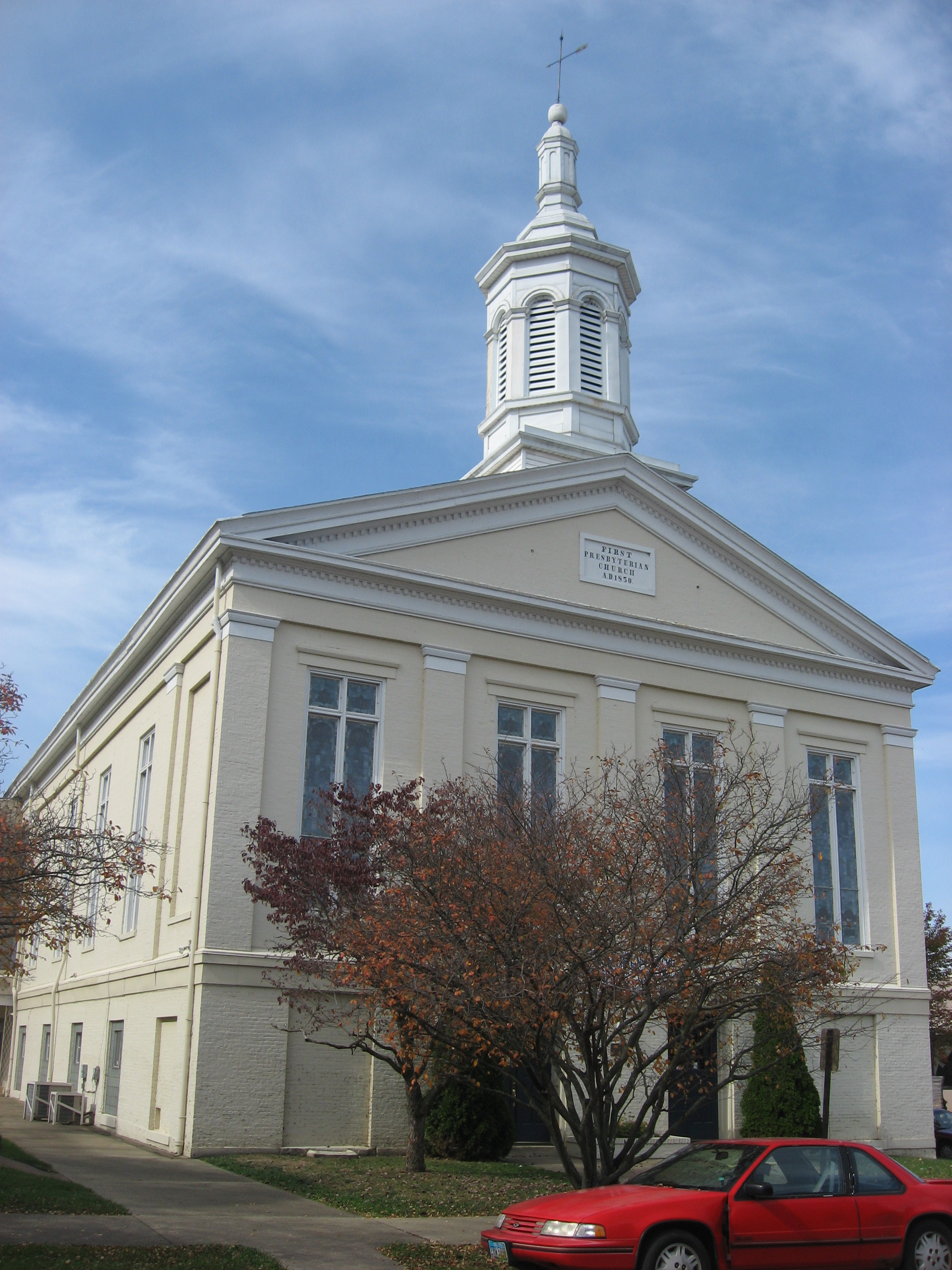
- Front of the church

- Location within Ohio Location within the United States
- Location: 221 Court St., Portsmouth, Ohio
- Coordinates: 38°43′55″N 83°0′4″W
- Area: Less than 1 acre (0.40 ha)
- Built: 1849
- Architectural style: Greek Revival
- Part of: Boneyfiddle Commercial District (ID79001938)
- NRHP reference No.: 73001532
- Added to NRHP: November 28, 1973

First Presbyterian Church is a historic church at 221 Court Street in Portsmouth, Ohio.

The Greek Revival church building was constructed in 1849. It was added to the National Register of Historic Places in 1973.
