= First Presbyterian Church (Hot Springs, Arkansas) =

Historic church in Arkansas, United States

- U.S. National Register of Historic Places
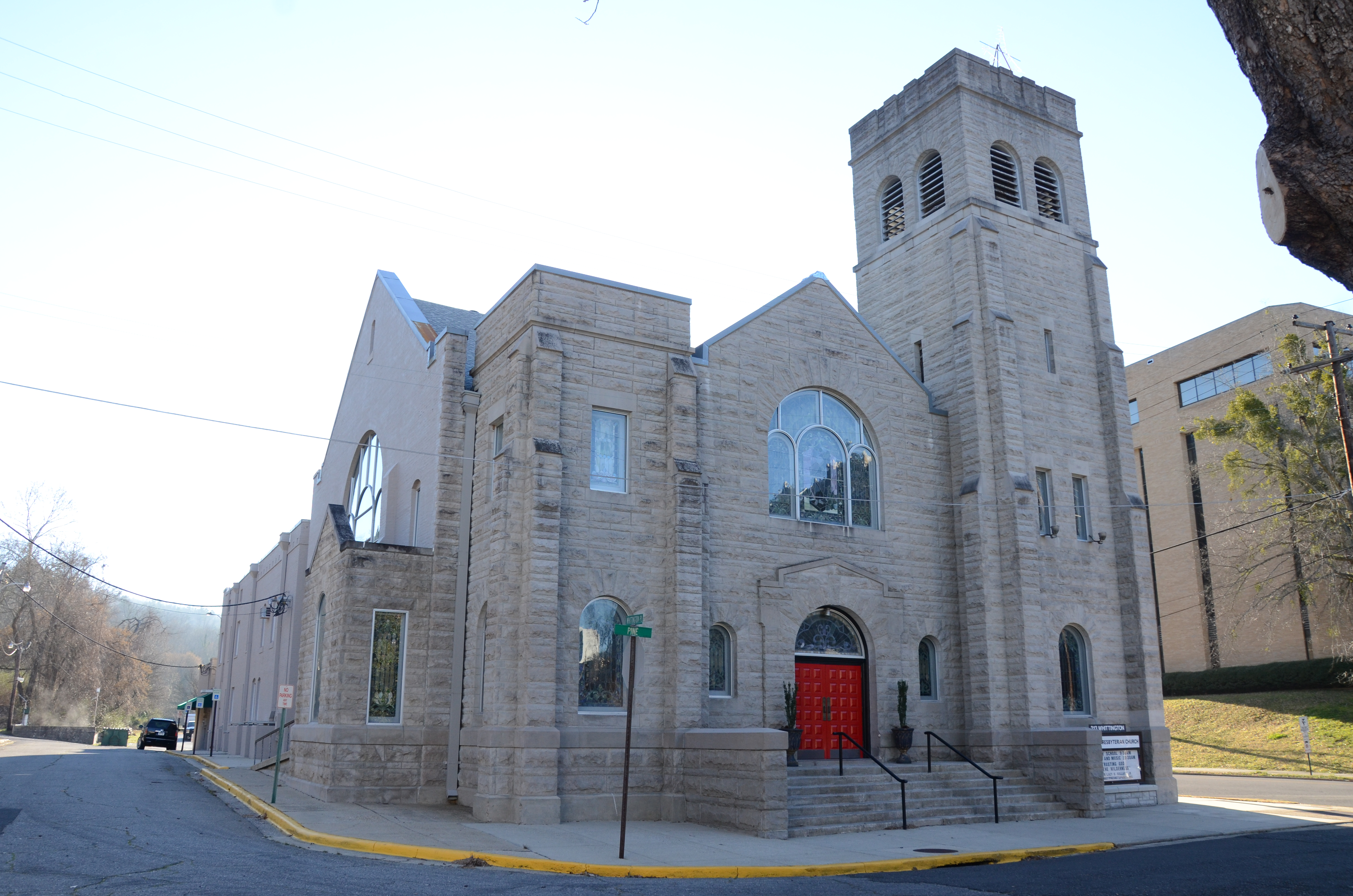

- Location within Arkansas Location within the United States
- Location: 213 Whittington, Hot Springs, Arkansas
- Coordinates: 34°30′58″N 93°3′33″W
- Area: less than one acre
- Built: 1907
- Architect: Thompson, Charles L.
- Architectural style: Late Gothic Revival
- MPS: Thompson, Charles L., Design Collection TR
- NRHP reference No.: 82000817
- Added to NRHP: December 22, 1982

The First Presbyterian Church is a historic church at 213 Whittington Avenue in Hot Springs, Arkansas. It is a large stone building, designed by Charles L. Thompson in Late Gothic Revival style and built in 1907. It has a square tower with pronounced buttressing at the corners set on the right side of its front facade, and a lower tower at the left side, with a gabled entry section at the center. The entrance is set in a broad lancet-arched opening, and is topped in the gable by a three-part stained glass window. The main sanctuary space is set perpendicular to the main facade, with a large stained glass window set in a recessed round-arch panel at the end. An entrance into the tunnels underneath hot springs is also located here.

The church was listed on the National Register of Historic Places in 1982.

== See also ==
- National Register of Historic Places listings in Garland County, Arkansas
