= First Presbyterian Church of Abilene =

Historic church in Kansas, United States

- Formerly listed on the U.S. National Register of Historic Places
- Location within Kansas Location within the United States
- Location: 300 N. Mulberry St., Abilene, Kansas
- Coordinates: 38°55′4″N 97°13′5″W
- Area: less than one acre
- Built: 1882
- Architect: E.J. Robinson; S.S. Voigt
- Architectural style: Late Gothic Revival, Romanesque
- NRHP reference No.: 01000540

Significant dates
- Added to NRHP: May 25, 2001
- Removed from NRHP: January 7, 2015

First Presbyterian Church of Abilene (Tietjens Center for the Performing Arts) was a historic church building at 300 N. Mulberry Street in Abilene, Kansas.

== History ==
It was built in 1882 and added to the National Register of Historic Places in 2001. The building was destroyed by a fire on July 23, 2014.
