= First Presbyterian Church of Woodruff =

Historic church in South Carolina, United States

- U.S. National Register of Historic Places
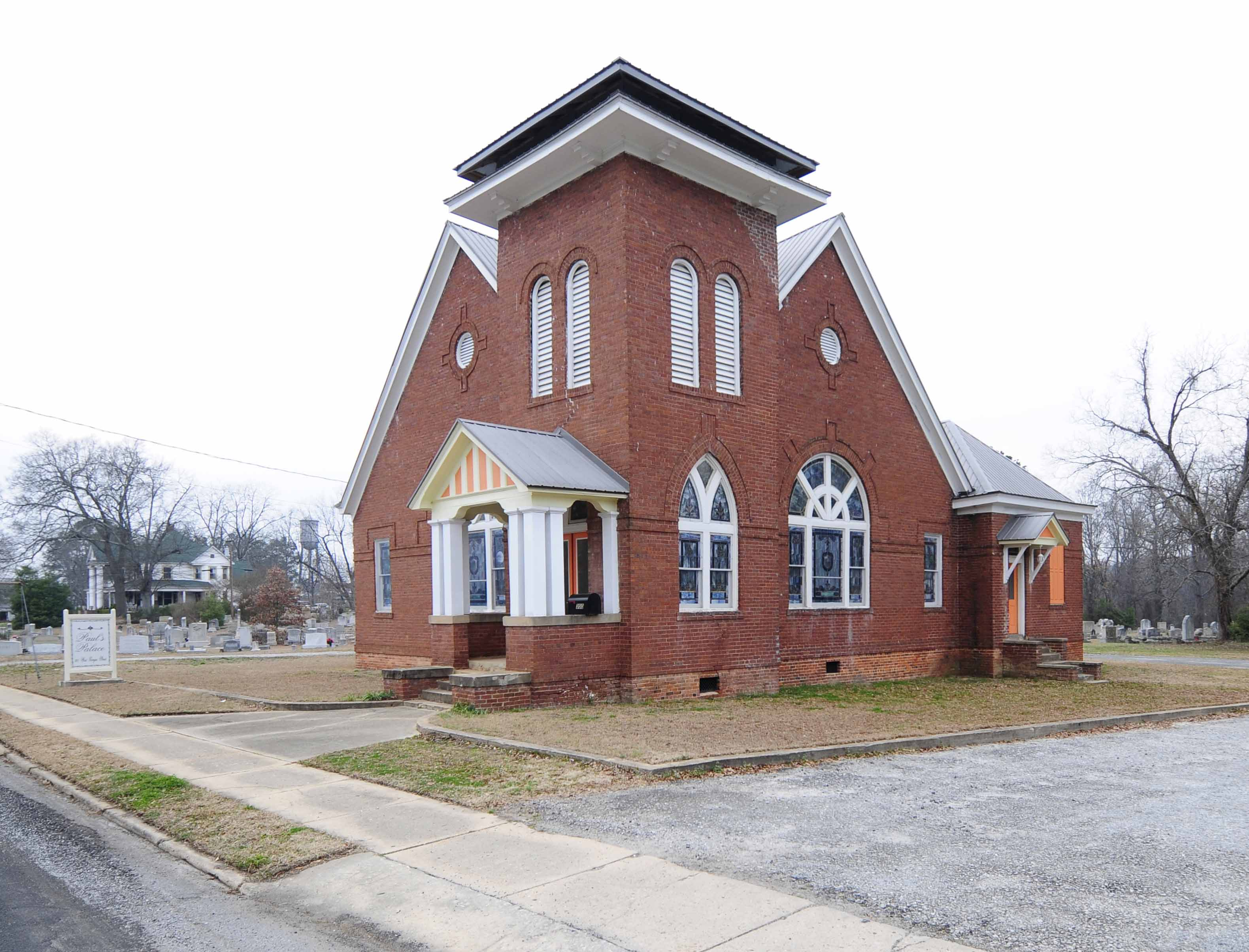

- Location within South Carolina Location within the United States
- Location: West Georgia St., Woodruff, South Carolina
- Coordinates: 34°44′19″N 82°2′27″W
- Area: less than one acre
- Built: 1911
- Architect: Proffit, Luther D.,
- Architectural style: Romanesque, Gothic Revival
- NRHP reference No.: 04001563
- Added to NRHP: January 26, 2005

First Presbyterian Church of Woodruff (Woodruff Associate Reformed Presbyterian Church) is a historic church on West Georgia Street in Woodruff, South Carolina.

It was built in 1911 and added to the National Register of Historic Places in 2005.

On January 4, 2010, the First Presbyterian Church of Woodruff (ARP) was purchased by Paul Kaminer for a private residence named Paul's Palace. The building was restored and renovated during a 5-year renovation project into the luxurious home of Paul and Katherine Kaminer. The home features such things as a spiral staircase to the mezzanine, a six-sided master bed chamber with 14 foot ceiling, a domed ceiling over the formal areas with pilasters in each room and rosettes for decor, and a master bath with heated floor. All rooms are themed with items gleaned from around the world in the travels of Paul Kaminer including an African-themed family room, an Icelandic-themed kitchen, Oriental-themed formal livingroom and dining room, Native American-themed parlor, Gothic-themed half bath, South American themed-master bath, calla lily-themed master bed chamber, angel-themed entry hall in the bell tower, and other themes in the 4,000 sq. ft. home. The yards are terraced with statuary scattered throughout the gardens. The fully private back yard includes a hot-tub.
