= First Presbyterian Church Sanctuary Building =

Historic church in California, United States

- U.S. National Register of Historic Places
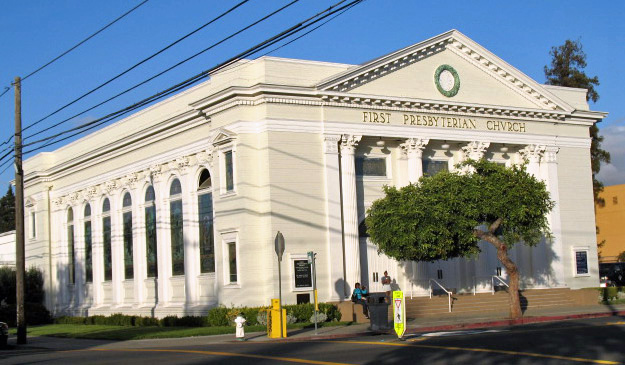

- Location within Oakland, California Location within California Location within the United States
- Location: 2001 Santa Clara Ave., Alameda, California
- Coordinates: 37°46′11″N 122°15′0″W
- Area: 0.1 acres (0.040 ha)
- Built: 1904
- Architect: Henry H. Meyers
- Architectural style: Classical Revival, Renaissance
- NRHP reference No.: 80000792
- Added to NRHP: November 25, 1980

The First Presbyterian Church Sanctuary Building is a historic church building at 2001 Santa Clara Avenue in Alameda, California. It was built in 1904, and was added to the National Register in 1980.

It is 60 by 100 feet (18 m × 30 m) in plan.

The building's main sanctuary walls include 14 stained glass windows. Four of these are decorative; ten depict Christ.

Other buildings on the property, built in 1967, are not included in the nomination.
