= First Presbyterian Church of Pulaski =

Historic church in Tennessee, United States

- U.S. National Register of Historic Places
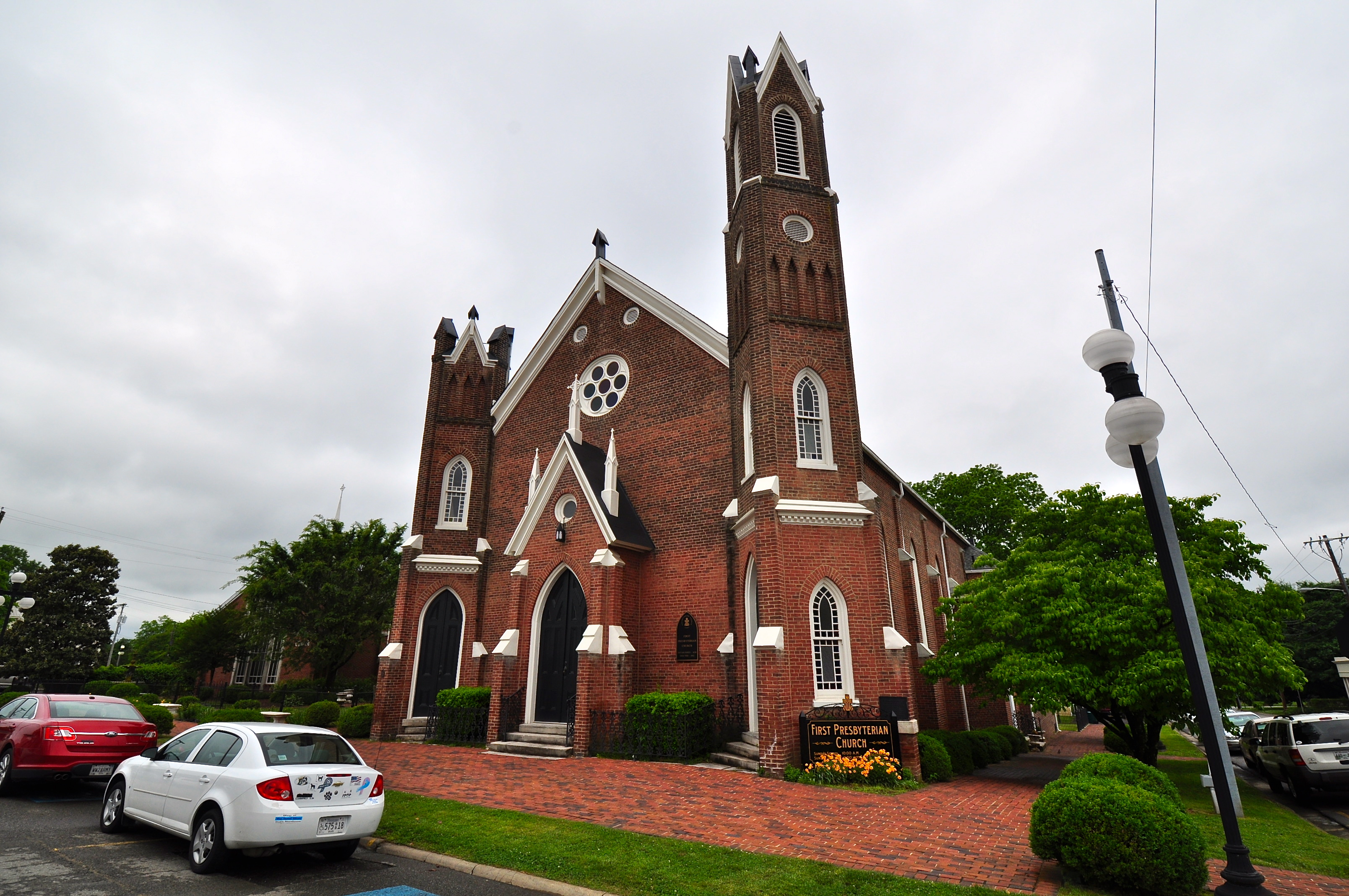
- First Presbyterian Church of Pulaski, May 2014.

- Location within Tennessee Location within the United States
- Location: 202 S. Second St., Pulaski, Tennessee
- Coordinates: 35°11′53″N 87°1′59″W
- Area: less than one acre
- Built: 1882
- Architectural style: Gothic
- Website: http://firstpresbyterianpulaski.com
- NRHP reference No.: 83003032
- Added to NRHP: July 28, 1983

First Presbyterian Church of Pulaski is a historic church at 202 S. Second Street in Pulaski, Tennessee.

It was built in 1882 and added to the National Register in 1983.
