= First Presbyterian Church of Ramah =

Historic church in Colorado, United States

- U.S. National Register of Historic Places
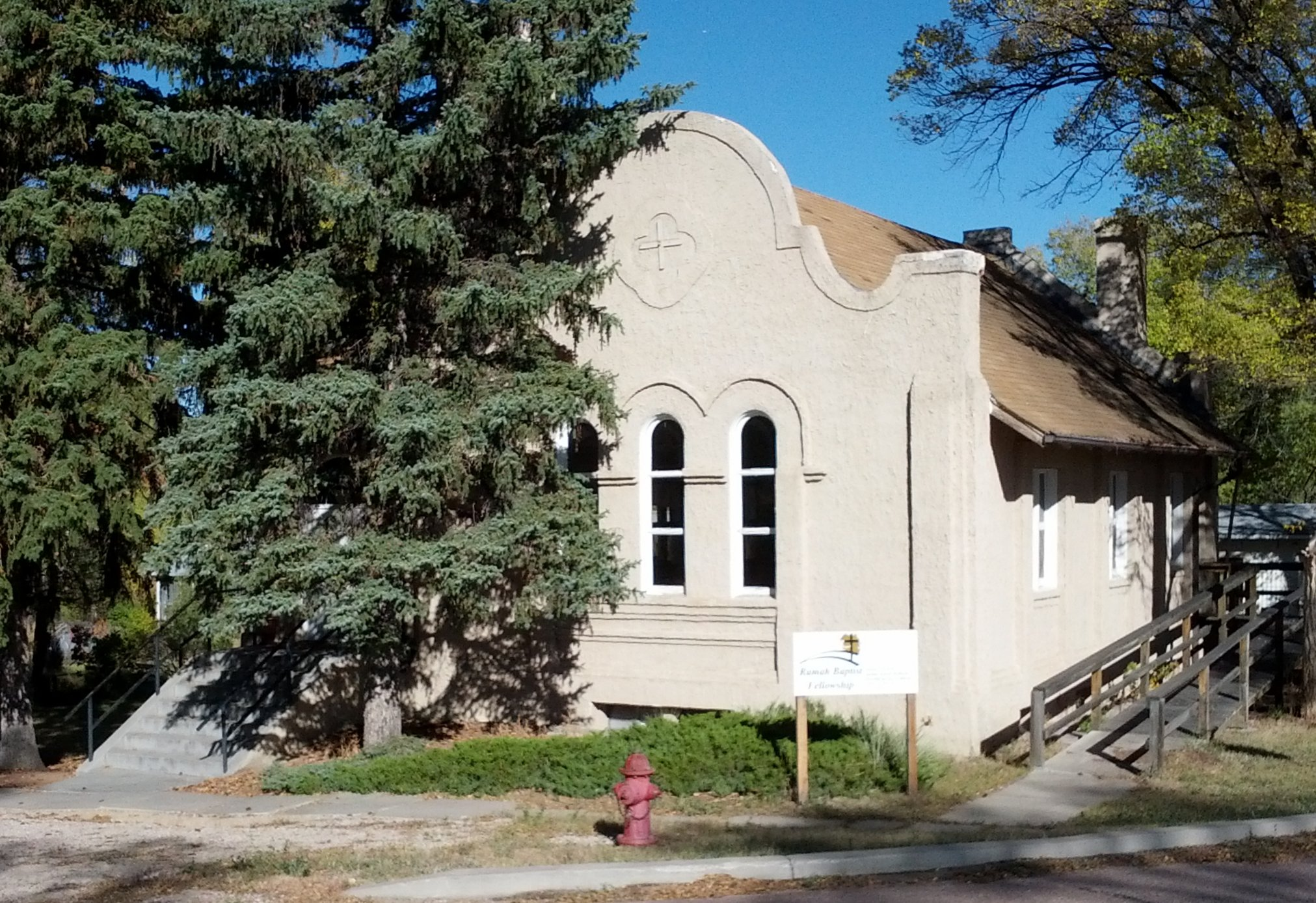
- Photo from 2012

- Location within Colorado Location within the United States
- Location: 113 S. Commercial St., Ramah, Colorado
- Coordinates: 39°07′13″N 104°10′02″W
- Area: less than one acre
- Built: 1916-17
- Built by: Frank R. Russell
- Architect: George M. Bryson
- Architectural style: Mission/spanish Revival, Other, Spanish Colonial Revival
- NRHP reference No.: 88001015
- Added to NRHP: July 7, 1988

The First Presbyterian Church of Ramah, which has also been known as the Ramah Town Hall, is a historic Presbyterian church at 113 S. Commercial Street in Ramah, Colorado. It was built in 1916-17 and was added to the National Register in 1988.

It is a rectangular, one-story wood-frame building which, in 1988, had not been used since 1974.

It was designed by architect George M. Bryson and was built by Frank R. Russell.

It is the best and only Mission Revival-style building in the small town of Ramah; it was the first church building in the town.

A photo in 2012 shows signage identifying it as home of the Ramah Baptist Fellowship.
