= First Presbyterian Church of Langford =

Historic church in South Dakota, United States

- U.S. National Register of Historic Places
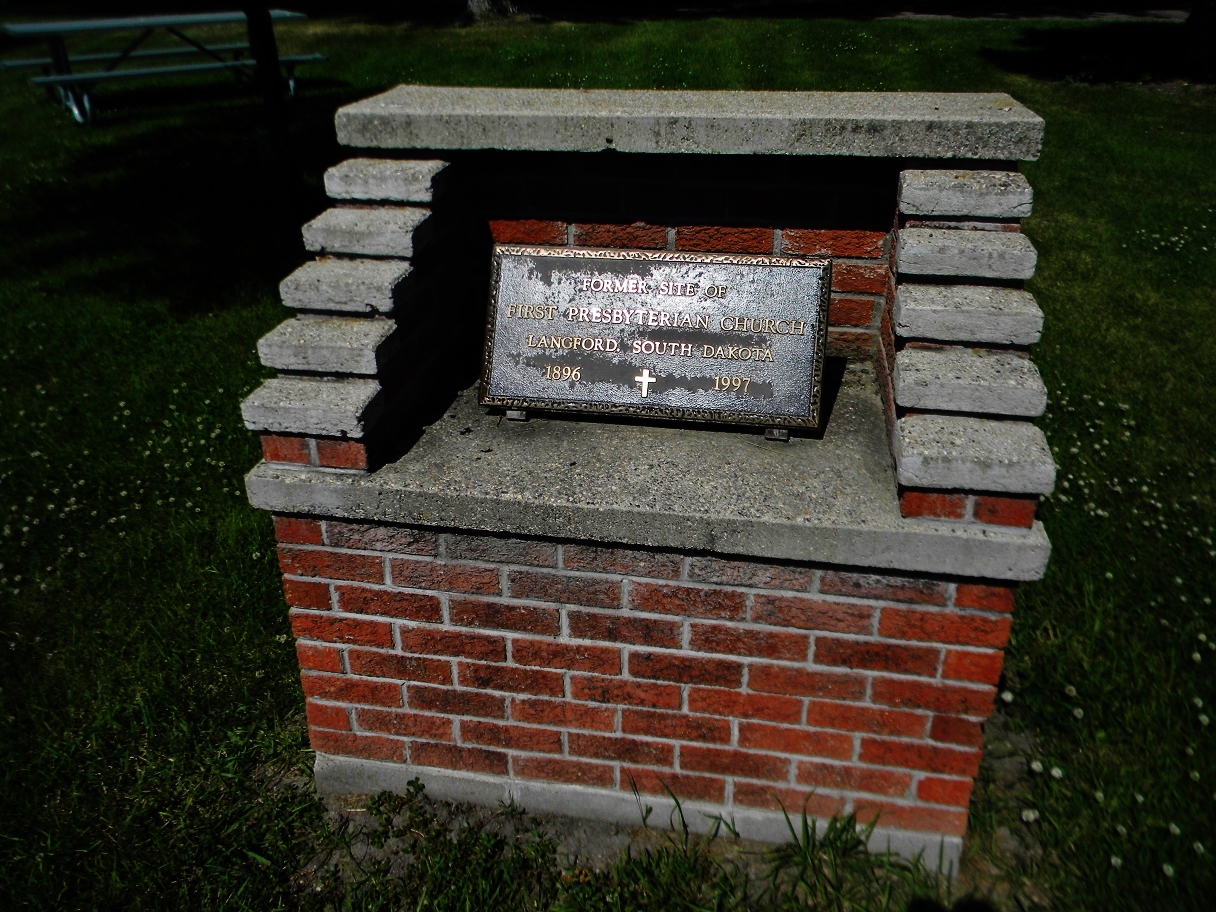
- Marker at the original site of the church

- Location within South Dakota Location within the United States
- Location: Jct. of Main and Lindley Sts., Langford, South Dakota
- Coordinates: 45°36′10″N 97°49′56″W
- Area: less than one acre
- Built: 1925
- Architectural style: Vernacular Akron plan
- NRHP reference No.: 91001616
- Added to NRHP: November 1, 1991

First Presbyterian Church of Langford was a historic Presbyterian church in Langford, South Dakota, USA. It was built in 1925 and added to the National Register of Historic Places in 1991. A marker at the site suggests the church existed from 1896 to 1997.
