= First Presbyterian Church of Maumee =

Historic church in Ohio, United States

- First Presbyterian Church of Maumee Chapel
- U.S. National Register of Historic Places
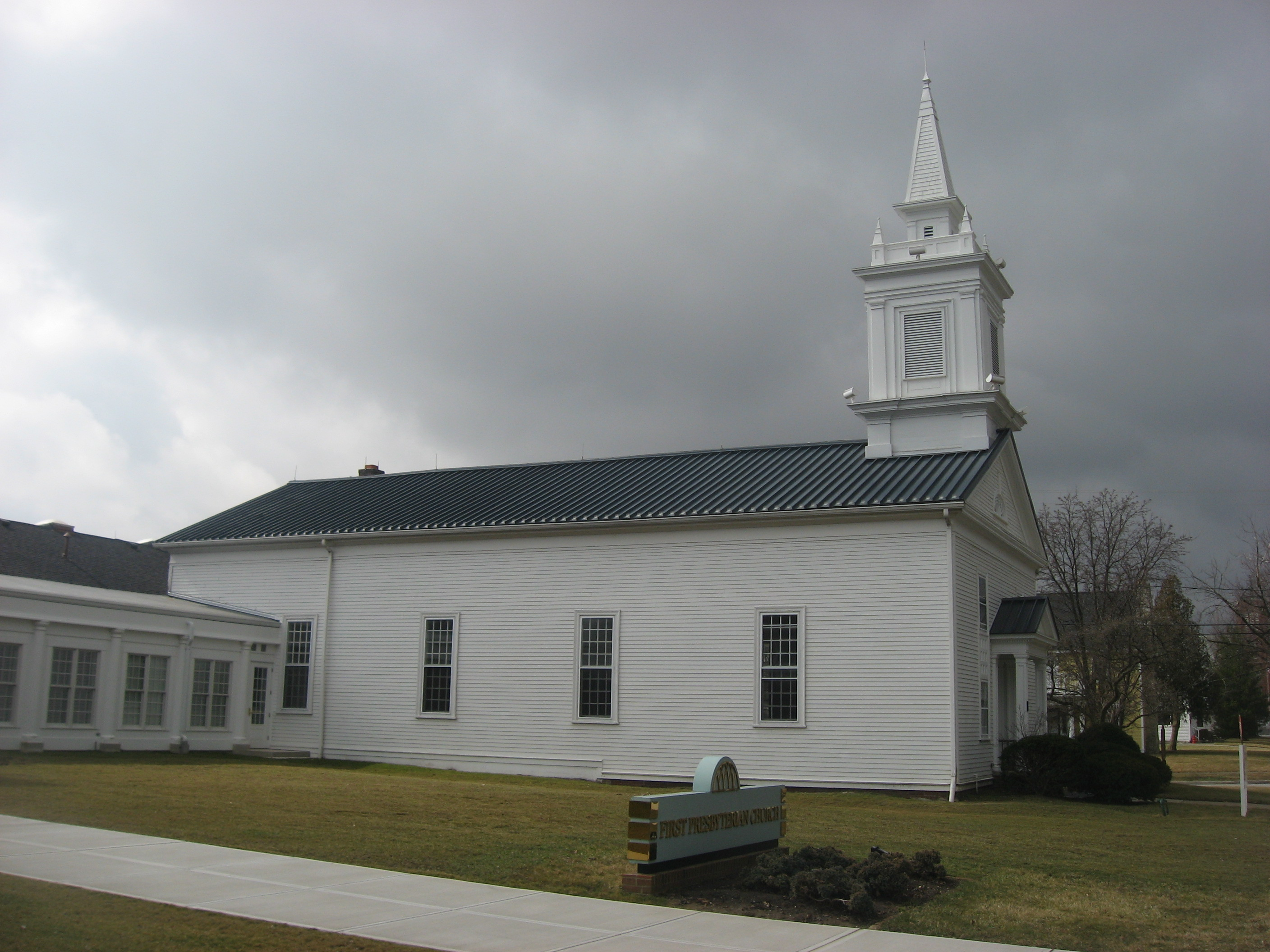
- Old building, now the chapel

- Location within Ohio Location within the United States
- Location: 200 E. Broadway, Maumee, Ohio
- Coordinates: 41°33′41″N 83°39′2″W
- Area: less than one acre
- Built: 1837
- Architectural style: Greek Revival
- NRHP reference No.: 73001498
- Added to NRHP: August 13, 1973

First Presbyterian Church of Maumee Chapel (also known as First Presbyterian Church of Maumee) is a historic church at 200 E. Broadway in Maumee, Ohio. It is the oldest church building in Northwest Ohio.

The Greek Revival church building was constructed in 1837 and added to the National Register of Historic Places in 1973.
