= First Presbyterian Church Rectory (Poughkeepsie, New York) =

Historic church in New York, United States

- First Presbyterian Church Manse
- U.S. National Register of Historic Places
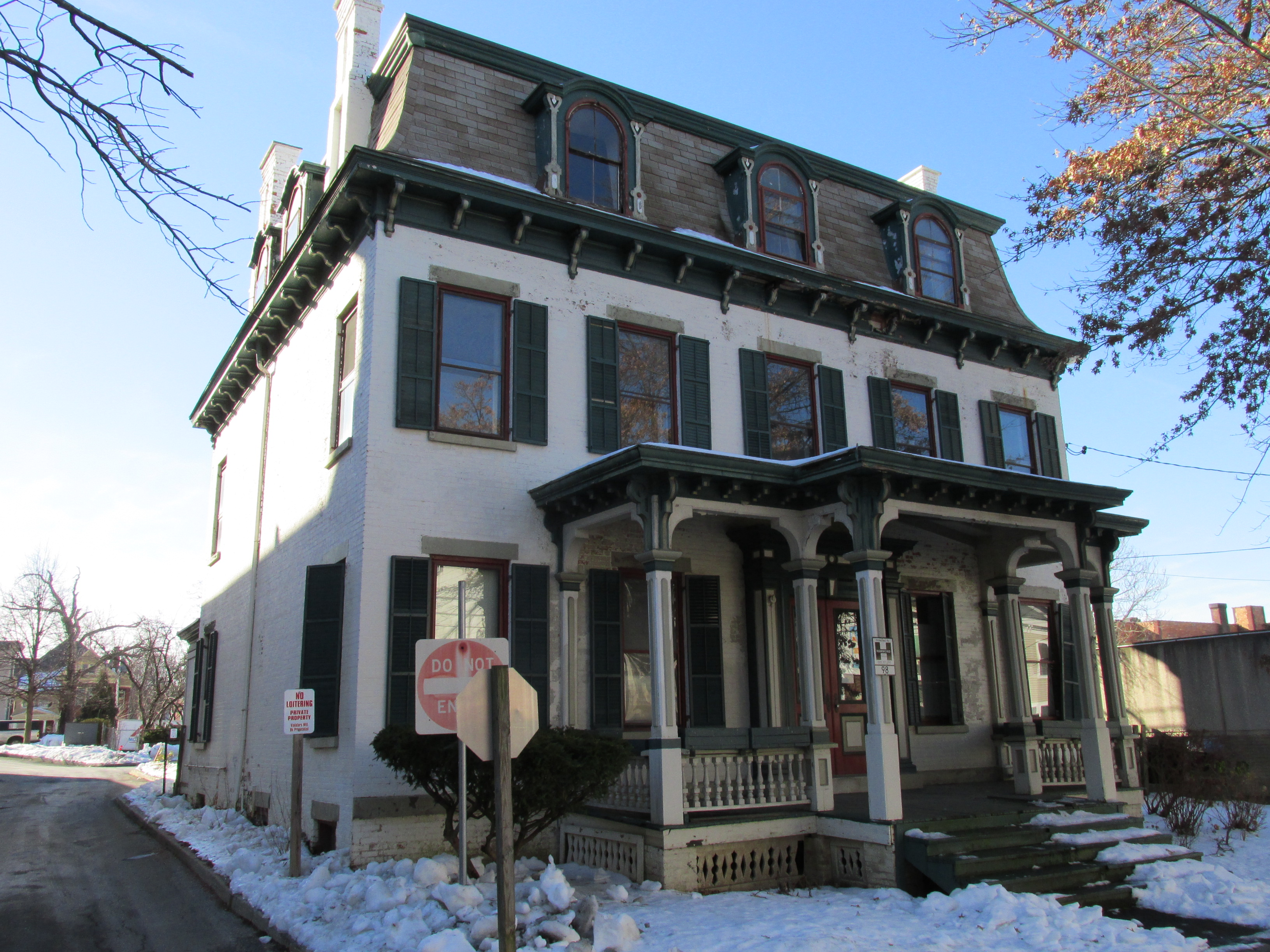
- First Presbyterian Church Rectory, January 2013

- Location within New York Location within the United States
- Location: 98 Cannon St., Poughkeepsie, New York
- Coordinates: 41°42′4″N 73°55′31″W
- Area: less than one acre
- Built: c.1857
- Architectural style: Second Empire
- MPS: Poughkeepsie MRA
- NRHP reference No.: 82001137
- Added to NRHP: November 26, 1982

First Presbyterian Church Manse is a historic Presbyterian churchmanse located at Poughkeepsie, Dutchess County, New York. It was built about 1857 and is a 2 1/2-story brick dwelling on a raised basement in the Second Empire style. It is five bays wide and features a bellcast mansard roof.

It was added to the National Register of Historic Places in 1982. The related church was added at the same time.
