= First Presbyterian Church (Shelbyville, Tennessee) =

Historic church in Tennessee, United States

- U.S. National Register of Historic Places
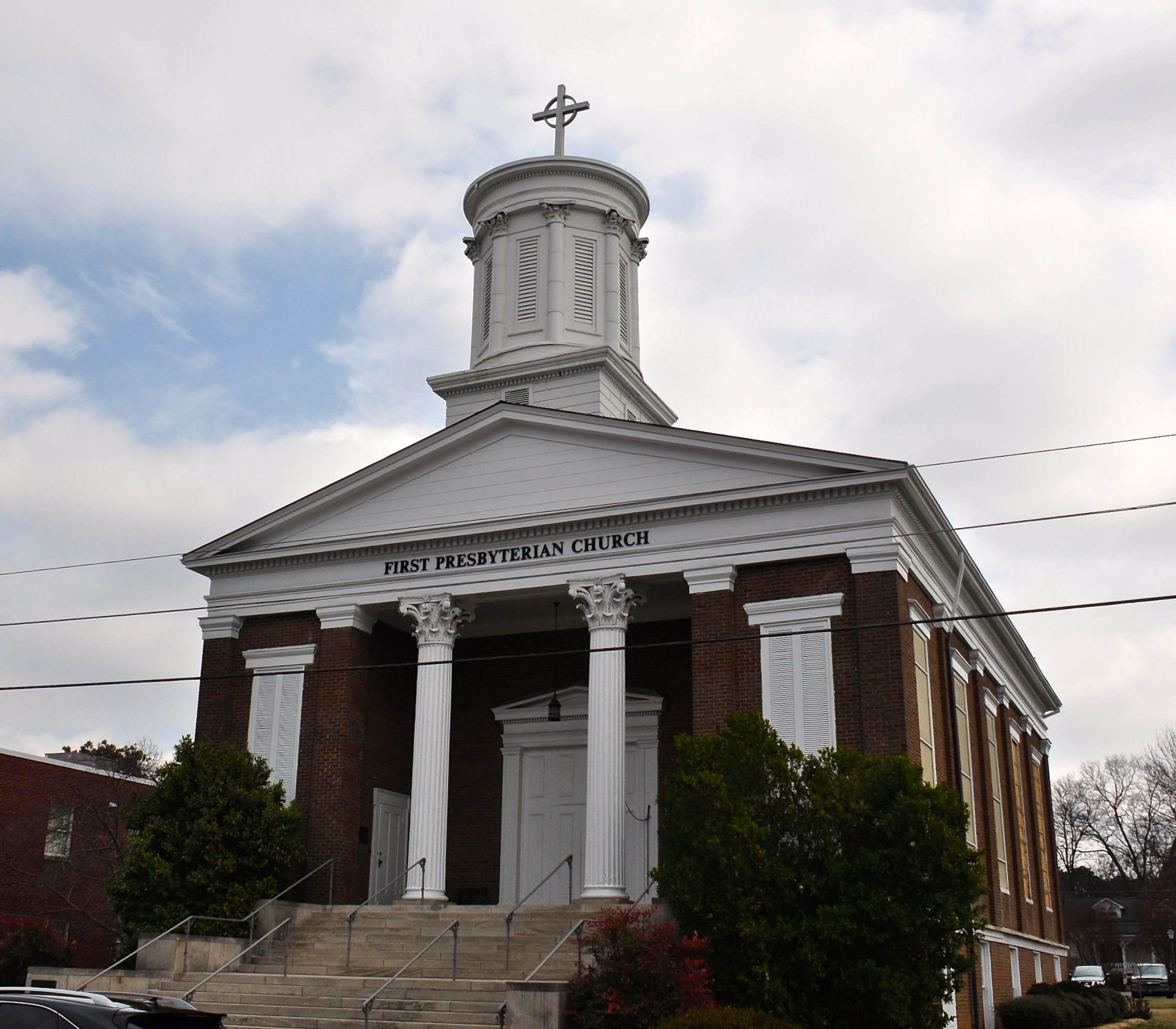
- First Presbyterian Church, Shelbyville, TN. March 2014.

- Location within Tennessee Location within the United States
- Location: 600 N. Brittain St., Shelbyville, Tennessee
- Coordinates: 35°29′10″N 86°27′29″W
- Area: 1.2 acres (0.49 ha)
- Built: 1854
- Architect: Gosling, William H.
- Architectural style: Greek Revival, Greek Revival Ecclesiastical
- NRHP reference No.: 80003780
- Added to NRHP: July 17, 1980

First Presbyterian Church is a historic church at 600 N. Brittain Street in Shelbyville, Tennessee.

The First Presbyterian congregation was established in 1815. It is affiliated with the Presbyterian Church (USA).

The church's Greek Revival building was completed in 1854 and added to the National Register of Historic Places in 1980. It has been described as one of Tennessee's finest Greek Revival churches.
