= First Presbyterian Church (Talladega, Alabama) =

Historic church in Alabama, United States

- U.S. National Register of Historic Places
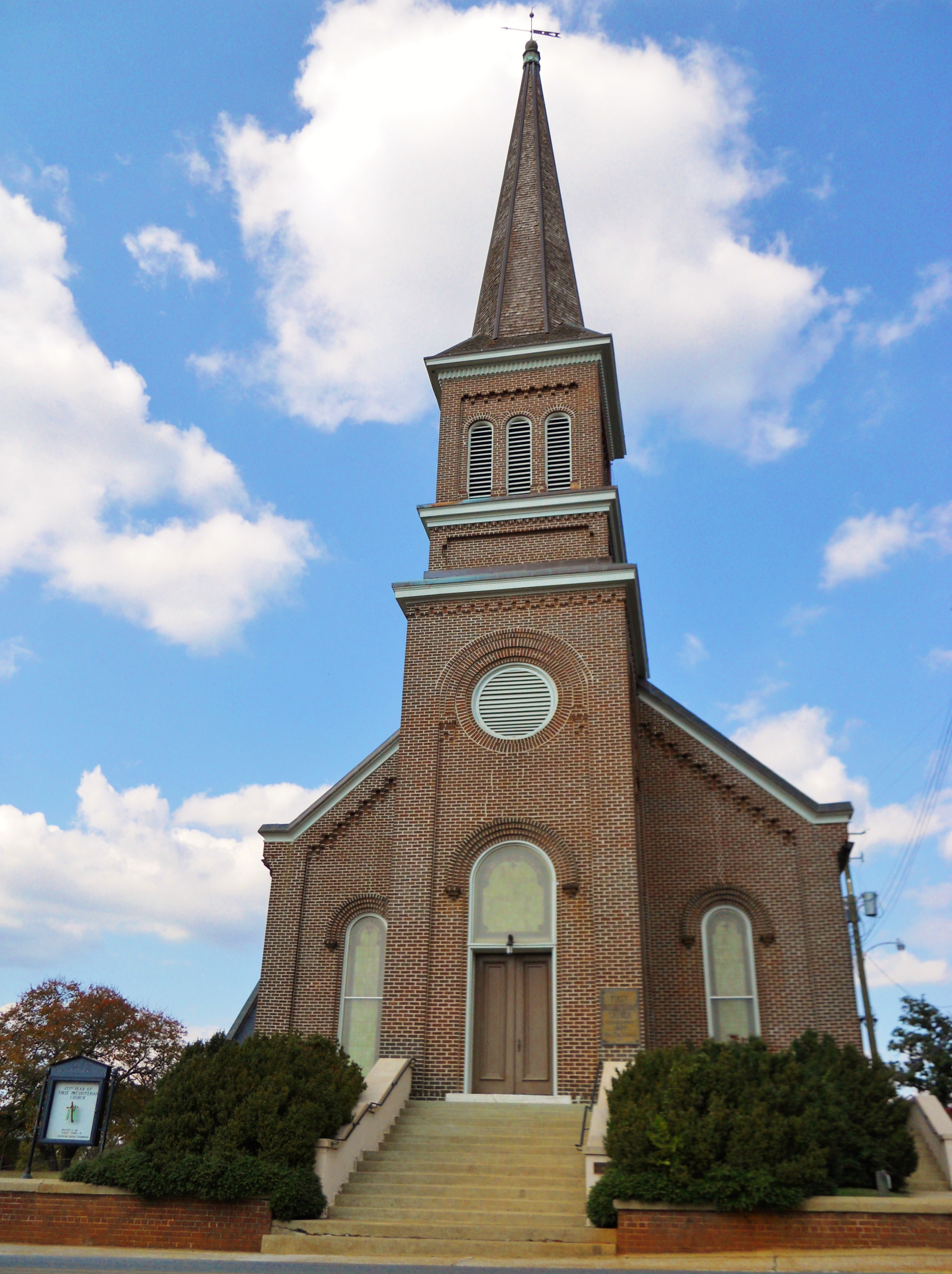

- Location within Alabama Location within the United States
- Location: 130 North St. E, Talladega, Alabama
- Coordinates: 33°26′10″N 86°6′3″W
- Area: less than one acre
- Built: 1860
- Architect: John S. Stewart
- Architectural style: Neo-Romanesque
- NRHP reference No.: 83003489
- Added to NRHP: November 17, 1983

First Presbyterian Church is a historic church in Talladega, Alabama. It was built in 1860 and was added to the National Register of Historic Places in 1983.
