= First Presbyterian Church (Niagara Falls, New York) =

Historic church in New York, United States

- U.S. National Register of Historic Places
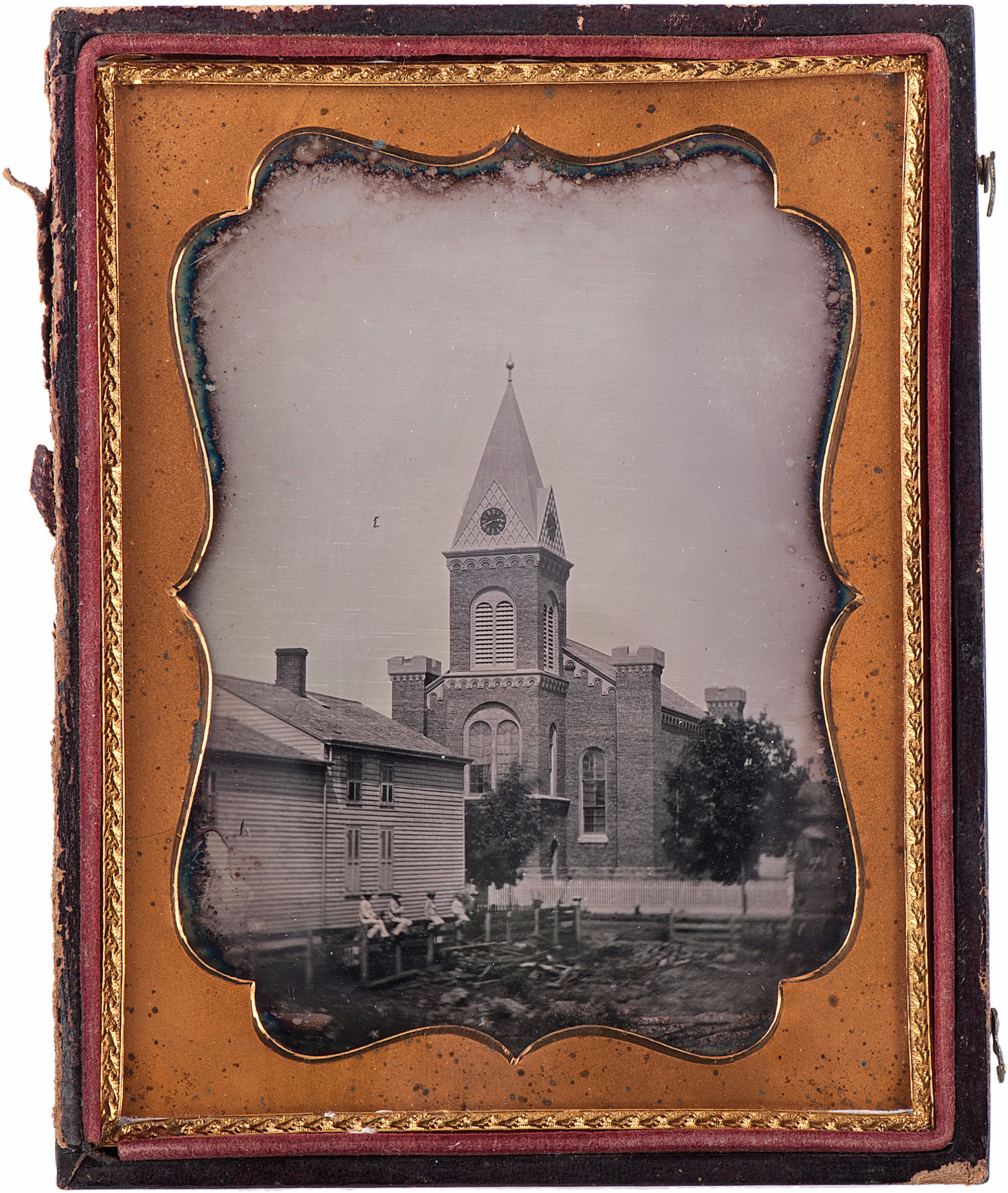
- First Presbyterian Church, circa 1850

- Location within New York Location within the United States
- Location: 311 1st St., Rainbow Blvd., N., Niagara Falls, New York
- Coordinates: 43°05′12″N 79°03′41″W
- Area: Less than 1 acre (0.40 ha)
- Built: 1849, 1879, 1903-1904, 1921
- Built by: Fay and Barger; David Phillips; P.B. Secord
- Architect: Calvin Fay; George W. Wright
- Architectural style: Gothic Revival, Italianate, Arts and Crafts
- NRHP reference No.: 14000145
- Added to NRHP: April 11, 2014

First Presbyterian Church is a historic Presbyterian Church located at Niagara Falls, Niagara County, New York. The church is part of the Presbytery of Western New York which is part of the Synod of the Northeast, a regional body of the Presbyterian Church (USA). The original section was built in 1849, with additions and modifications made in 1879, 1903–1904, and 1921. The sanctuary was renovated in 1957. It is a Gothic Revival style, L-shaped, stone church. The church features a three-story crenellated bell tower and round arched windows and openings. The congregation was established in 1824.

It was listed on the National Register of Historic Places in 2014.
