= First Presbyterian Church (Hays, Kansas) =

Historic church in Kansas, United States

- U.S. National Register of Historic Places
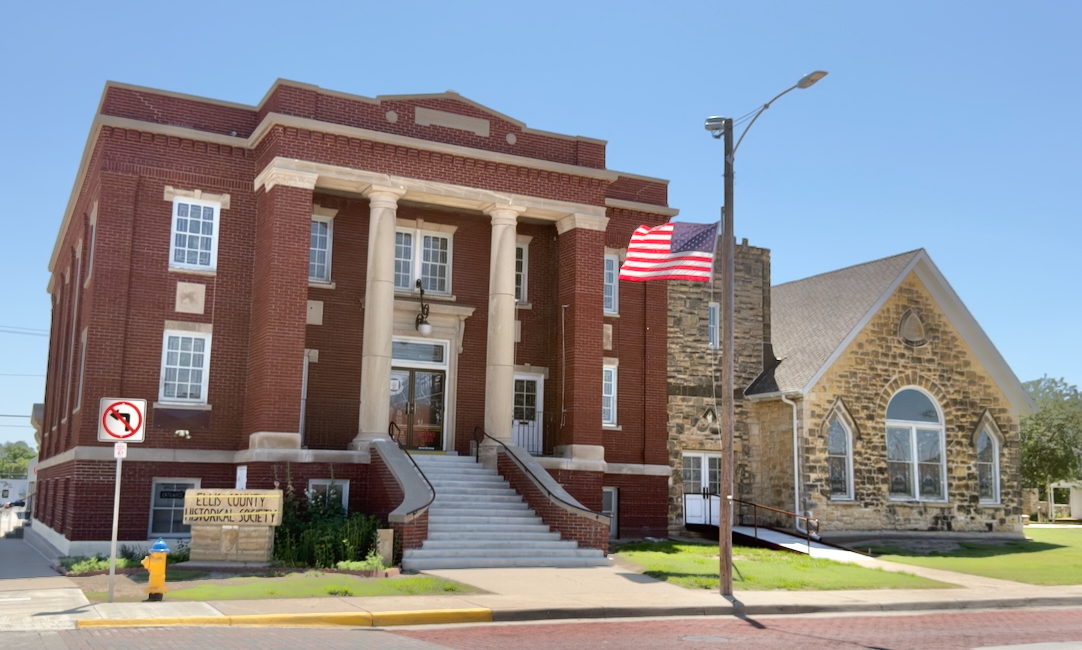
- The historical church is on the right.

- Location within Kansas Location within the United States
- Location: 100 W. 7th St. Hays, Kansas
- Coordinates: 38°52′15″N 99°19′50″W
- Area: 1 acre (0.40 ha)
- Built: 1879
- Architectural style: Gothic
- NRHP reference No.: 73000753
- Added to NRHP: March 30, 1973

The First Presbyterian Church in Hays, Kansas is a historic stone Presbyterian church building at 100 W. 7th Street. It was built in 1879 and added to the National Register in 1973.

The congregation was organized in 1873, and may have been the first in western Kansas.

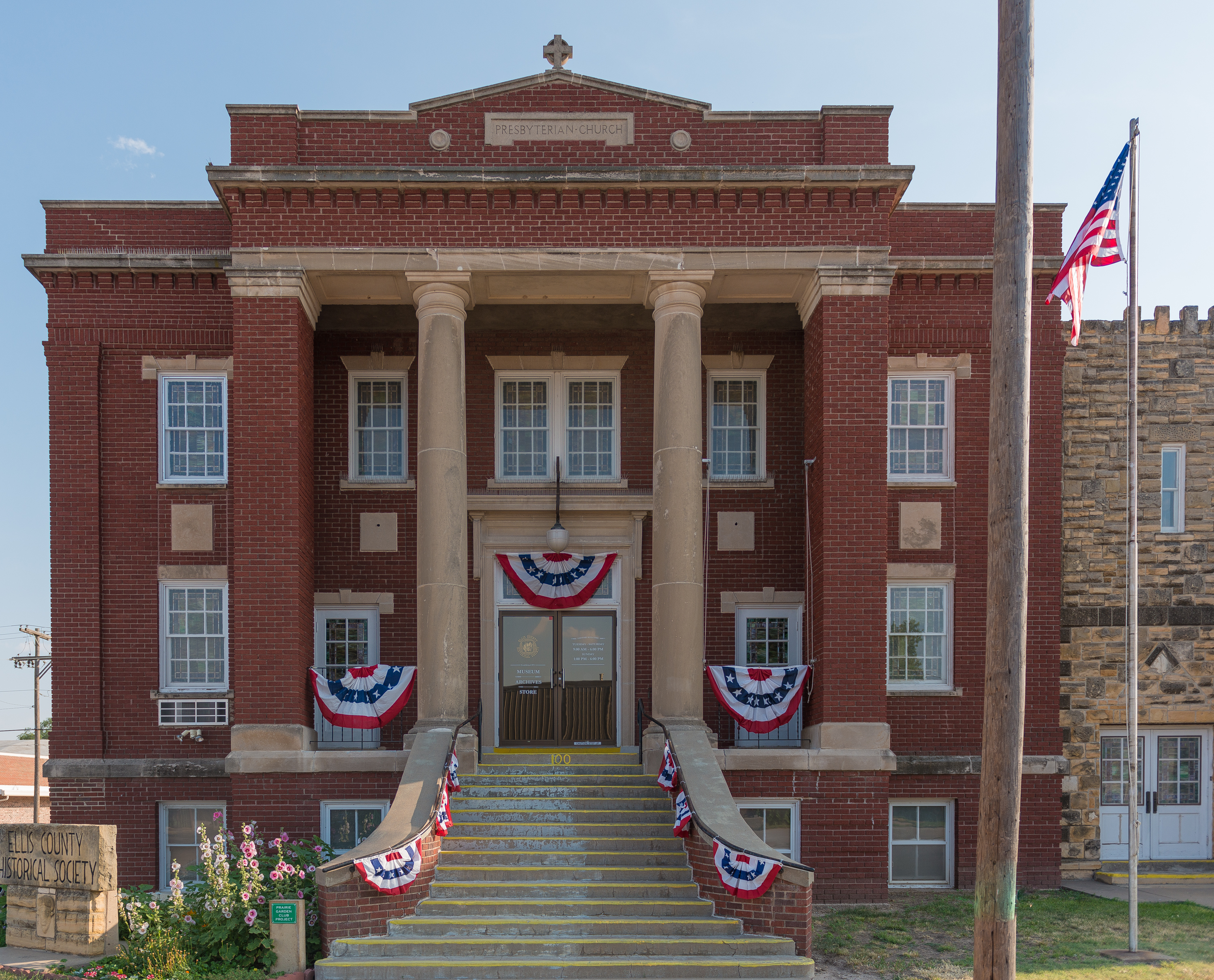
Photo of building next to the historic stone church
