= First Presbyterian Church (Bethlehem, Pennsylvania) =

Coordinates: 40.645°N 75.374°W

Religion
- Affiliation: Presbyterian
- Year consecrated: 1875
- Status: active

Location
- Location: Bethlehem, Pennsylvania, U.S.A.

The First Presbyterian Church of Bethlehem, Pennsylvania was established in 1875, and the present building on Center Street was completed in 1957. The Church had 2,609 members as of June 2015 but the Presbyterian Church, like every mainline Protestant denomination, has suffered a decline in national membership, especially over the past decade.

In 2016, the elected leadership (the session) voted to break away from the national denomination, the Presbyterian Church (USA) or PC (USA) to join a new conservative body, the Evangelical Covenant Order of Presbyterians or ECO. Points of contention between the two bodies hinge on acceptance of same sex issues by the national church, their involvement in social justice issues such as gun violence and the Israel–Palestine conflict, and ECO's belief in Biblical literalism.

During the past year, a group of members, Presbyterians for Unity, desiring to remain within the Presbyterian Church (USA), were against the split and had attempted dialog with the church leadership to attempt some form of reconciliation. Two polls were initially taken, the first was an official vote under established Presbyterian church law and the second was an unofficial straw vote to determine the wishes of as many church members as possible. Both of these votes indicated that there was insufficient percentage of members required to allow an amicable separation under established Church law. Church law does not recognize straw polls. A third vote was taken by followers of ECO under State law as an independent corporation of the State of Pennsylvania. Case law in Pennsylvania in the past has not permitted a Church to be divided under corporate law and this is the basis of one lawsuit. Recent similar court rulings nationally have taken similar positions. Since July 2016, both religious groups comply with a court order to hold separate services within the church property.

There are three separate legal actions, presently, in Northampton County court attempting to resolve the issues of money, property, and official use of the name, the "First Presbyterian Church of Bethlehem". The three day trial ended August 30, 2017. On December 12, the court ruled that the church and all of its assets were legally held in trust by the Lehigh Presbytery for the PC(USA) congregation. A little more than a month later, the leadership of the ECO congregation announced that it would not appeal the court's ruling.
