= First Presbyterian Church of Clifton =

Historic church in Tennessee, United States

- U.S. National Register of Historic Places
- Location within Tennessee Location within the United States
- Location: Main St., Clifton, Tennessee
- Coordinates: 35°23′5″N 87°59′39″W
- Area: less than one acre
- Built: 1856
- NRHP reference No.: 88000172
- Added to NRHP: March 8, 1988

First Presbyterian Church of Clifton is a historic Presbyterian church located in an antebellum building on Main Street in Clifton, Tennessee.

== History ==
=== Building ===
The church was built in 1856. During the Civil War, it was used by military forces on both sides. The Confederate Army used the building as a hospital and the Union Army later (from about January to August 1864) used it as a livery stable and blacksmith shop. The main entrance door was enlarged to accommodate horses, and the brickwork around the doorway gives evidence of the repairs that were later made to restore the building. The congregation filed a damage claim with the United States federal government, and finally received compensation of $780 in 1915. The church's steeple was erected with the money received.

The building was added to the National Register of Historic Places in 1988.

=== Denominational affiliation ===
When founded, the congregation was affiliated with the Cumberland Presbyterians. Later it became part of the Presbyterian Church (U.S.A.). In 2014, the small congregation decided to leave that denomination and affiliate with the Evangelical Presbyterian Church. The Presbytery of Middle Tennessee agreed to dismiss the congregation and to allow the congregation to retain its name and property.
