= First Presbyterian Church (Idaho Falls, Idaho) =

Historic Presbyterian church in Idaho Falls, Idaho, US

- U.S. National Register of Historic Places
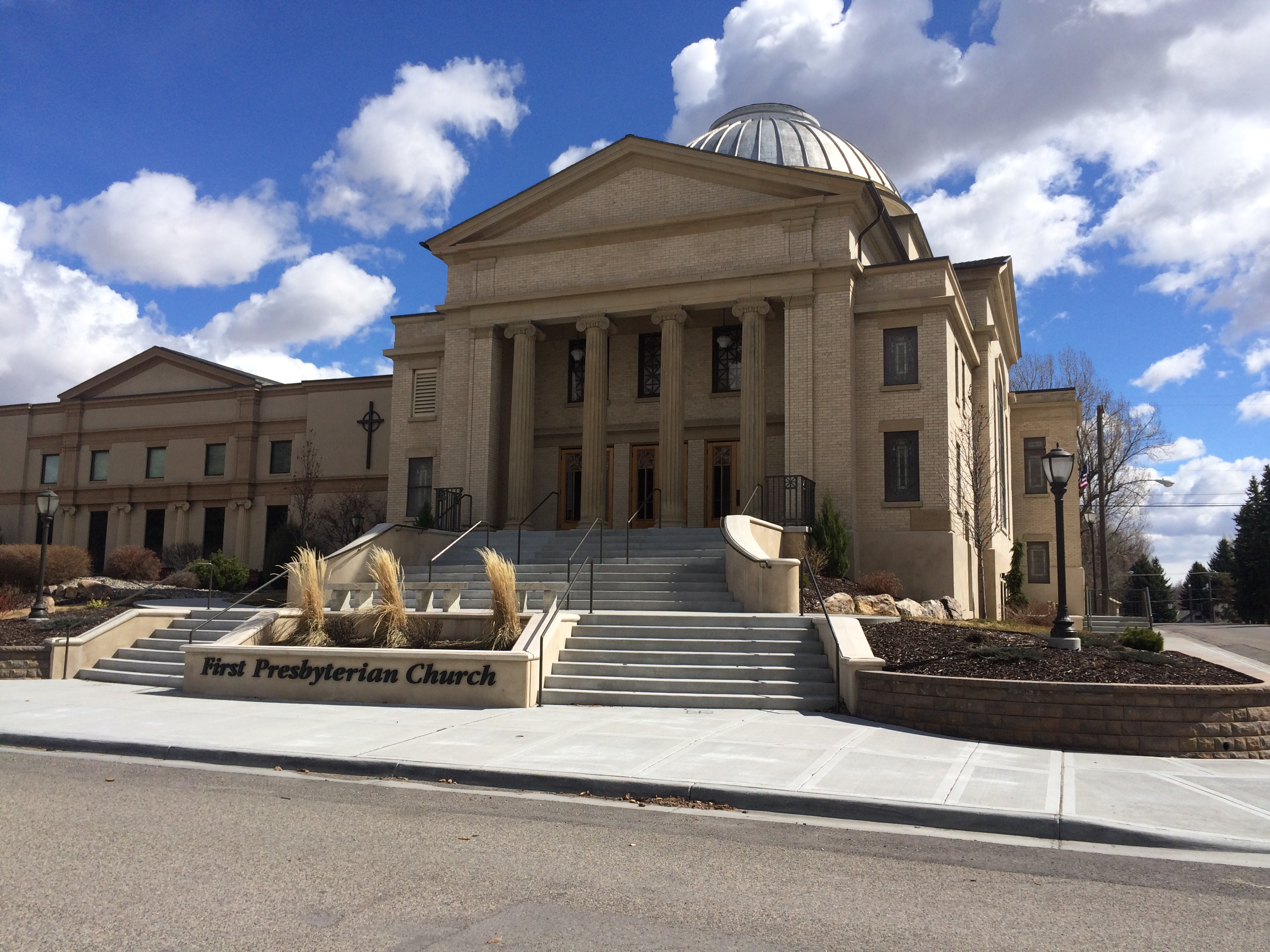
- The church in 2016

- Location within Idaho Location within the United States
- Location: 325 Elm Street, Idaho Falls, Idaho
- Coordinates: 43°29′22″N 112°2′6″W
- Area: less than one acre
- Built: 1918-1920
- Architect: Fulton, J.C.
- Architectural style: Classical Revival
- NRHP reference No.: 78001052
- Added to NRHP: March 29, 1978

First Presbyterian Church is a historic Presbyterian church at 325 Elm Street in Idaho Falls, Idaho, United States. It was built during 1918 to 1920 and was added to the National Register in 1978.

It was deemed architecturally significant as "a good example of the Neo-classical revival style"; its "dome and Ionic portico are impressive by Idaho's standards."

It is the only building in Idaho designed by Uniontown, Pennsylvania ecclesiastic architect J. C. Fulton.
