= First Presbyterian Church (Oshkosh, Wisconsin) =

Historic church in Wisconsin, United States

- U.S. National Register of Historic Places
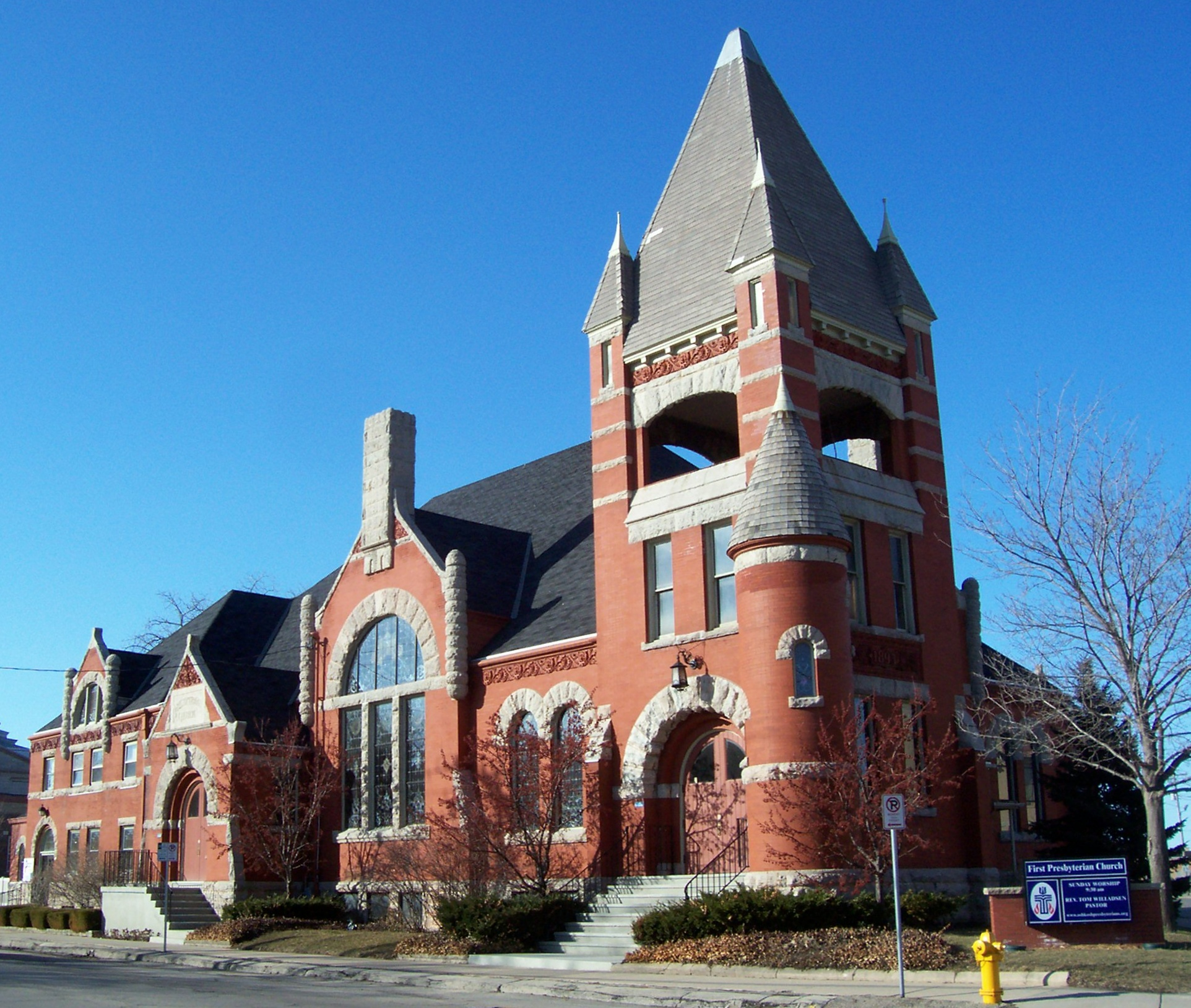

- Location within Wisconsin Location within the United States
- Location: 110 Church Ave., Oshkosh, Wisconsin
- Coordinates: 44°1′14″N 88°32′19″W
- Area: less than one acre
- Built: 1893
- Architect: Walter A. Holbrook
- Architectural style: Romanesque, Richardsonian Romanesque
- NRHP reference No.: 74000142
- Added to NRHP: December 27, 1974

First Presbyterian Church is a historic church at 110 Church Avenue in Oshkosh, Wisconsin, United States.

It was designed by Walter A. Holbrook of Milwaukee and built in 1893. The style is Richardsonian-Romanesque, with a complex, irregular profusion of turrets, chimneys and towers resembling Richardson's early libraries, meant to suggest it had been gradually added onto over many years. The exterior is red brick with stone trim. The interior normally seated 500 people, but could be expanded by raising doors to other rooms. A manse and office were added in 1905.

The building was added to the National Register of Historic Places in 1974, based on its architecture.
