= First Presbyterian Church (Cleveland, Tennessee) =

Historic church in Tennessee, United States

- U.S. National Register of Historic Places
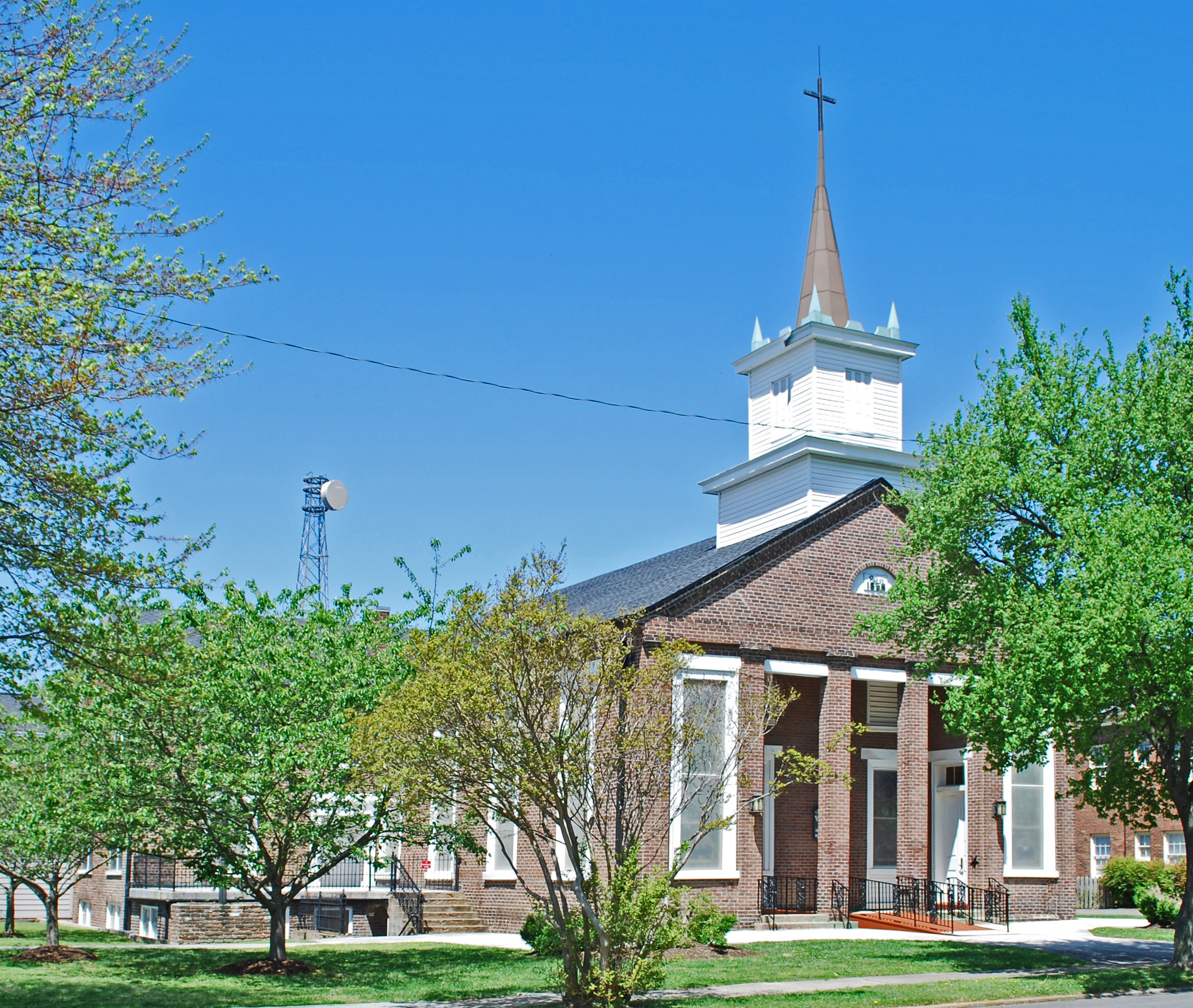

- Location within Tennessee Location within the United States
- Location: 433 Ocoee St. NW, Cleveland, Tennessee
- Coordinates: 35°9′44″N 84°52′25″W
- Area: less than one acre
- Built: 1856
- Architect: John Cowan and James Cowan
- Architectural style: Greek Revival
- NRHP reference No.: 86000396
- Added to NRHP: March 13, 1986

First Presbyterian Church is a historic church at 433 Ocoee Street NW in Cleveland, Tennessee. The First Presbyterian congregation is affiliated with the Presbyterian Church (U.S.A.) and the Presbytery of East Tennessee.

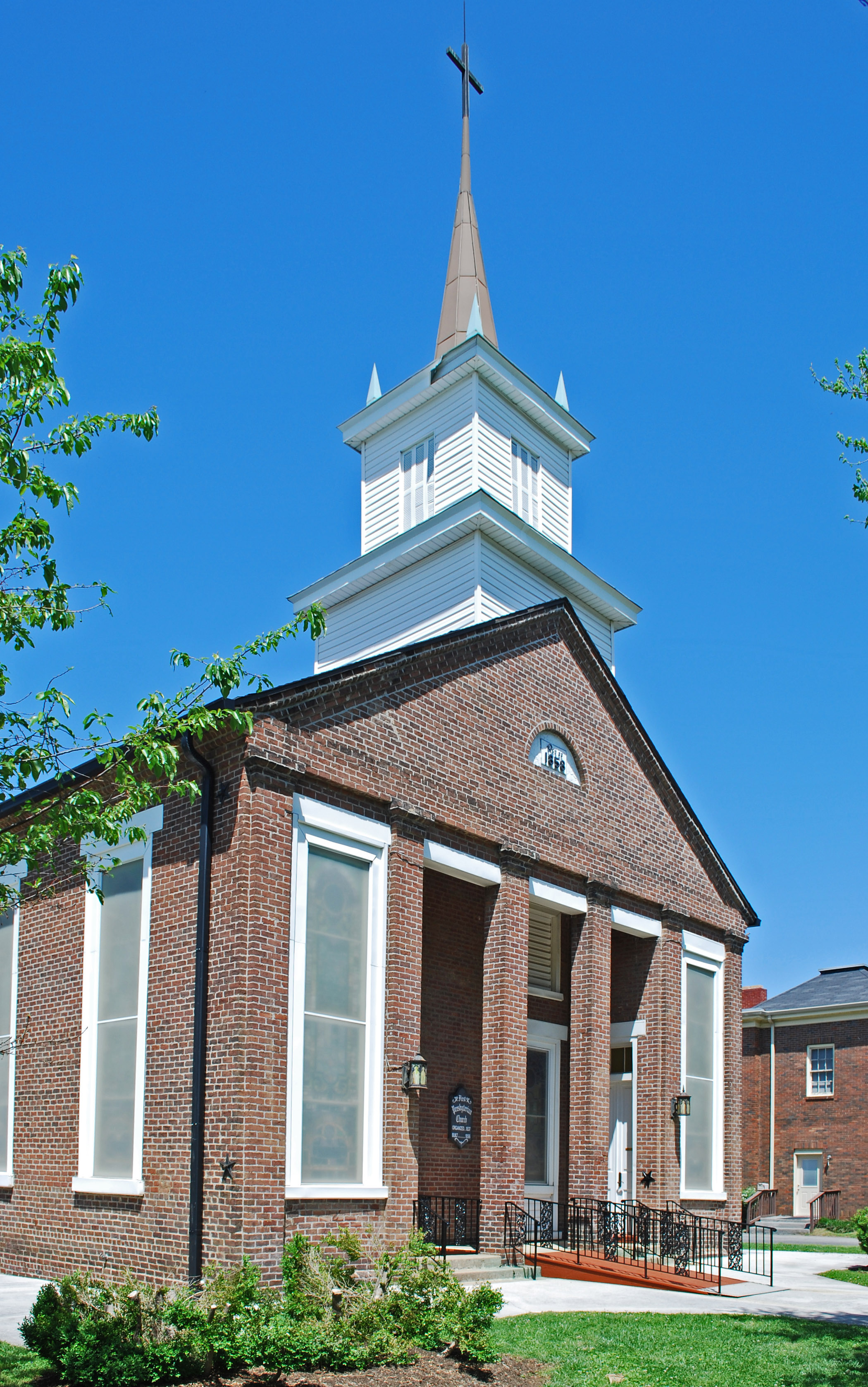

== History ==
The church was built in 1856 and is the oldest extant church building in Cleveland. It was damaged by military activity during the American Civil War; some of the musket balls that were fired into the steeple are still embedded there. It was added to the National Register of Historic Places in 1986.
