= First Presbyterian Church (Cartersville, Georgia) =

Historic church in Georgia, United States

- U.S. National Register of Historic Places
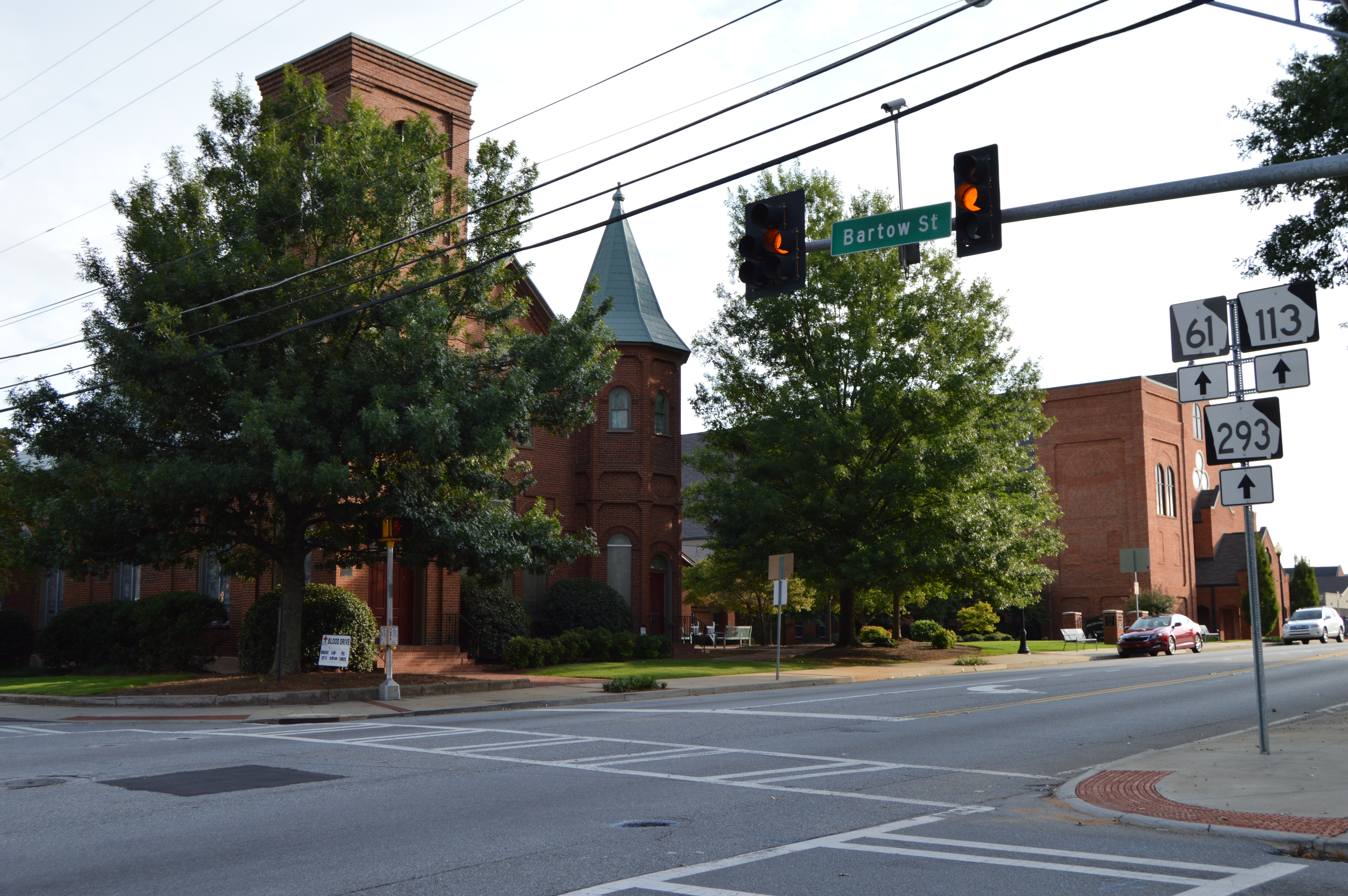

- Location within Georgia Location within the United States
- Location: 183 W. Main St., Cartersville, Georgia
- Coordinates: 34°9′51″N 84°47′59″W
- Area: 2 acres (0.81 ha)
- Built: 1853
- Architectural style: Romanesque
- NRHP reference No.: 91001157
- Added to NRHP: August 29, 1991

The First Presbyterian Church in Cartersville, Georgia, also known as Friendship Presbyterian Church, is a historic Presbyterian church at 183 W. Main Street. It was started in 1853 and was added to the National Register in 1991.

The Friendship Presbyterian Church was organized in 1843, south of Cartersville.
