= First Presbyterian Church (Elizabethtown, Kentucky) =

Historic church in Kentucky, United States

- Historic First Presbyterian Church
- U.S. National Register of Historic Places
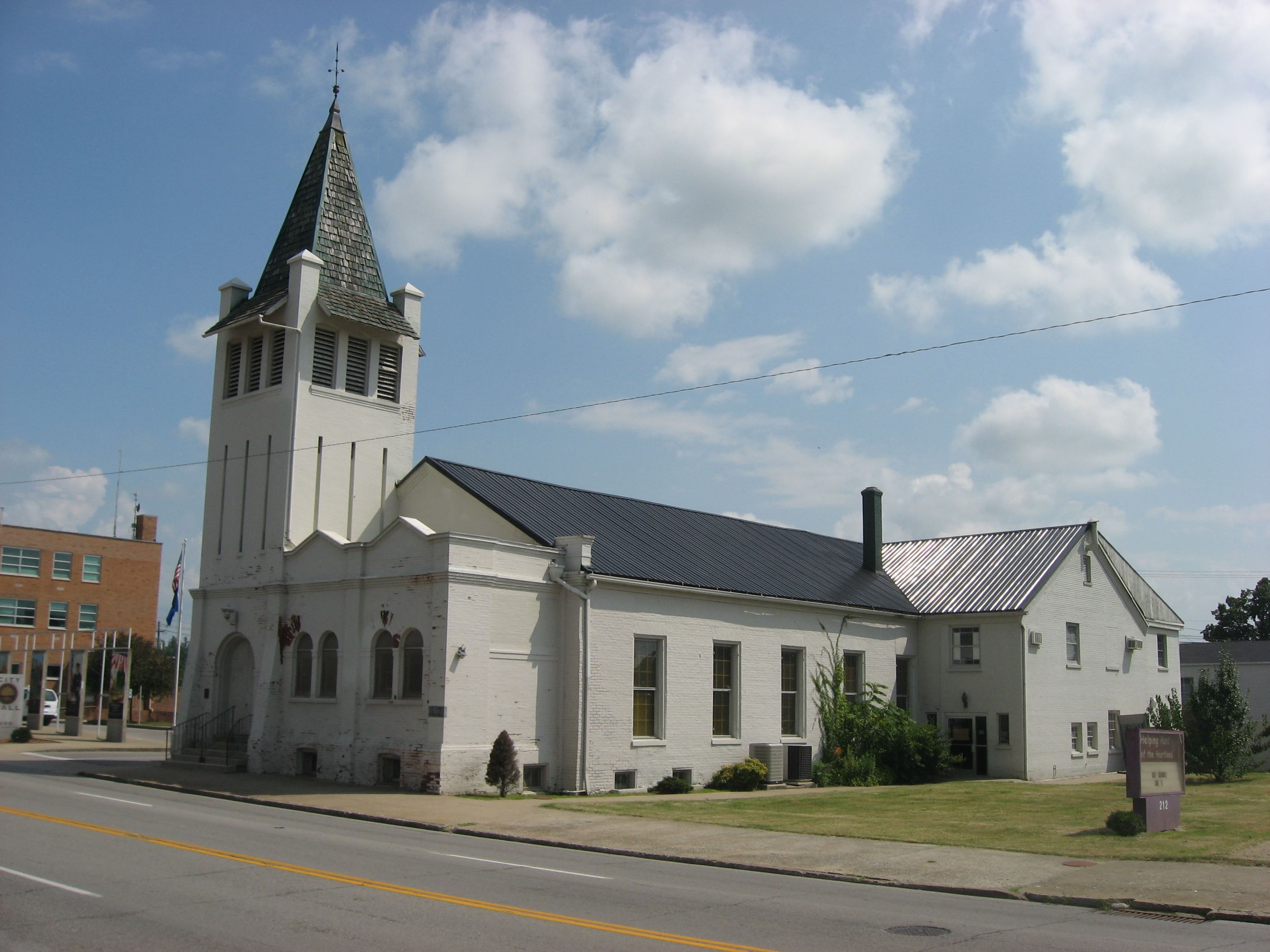
- Front and side of the church

- Location within Kentucky Location within the United States
- Location: 212 W. Dixie Ave., Elizabethtown, Kentucky
- Coordinates: 37°39′38″N 85°51′32″W
- Area: less than one acre
- Built: 1896
- Architectural style: Romanesque
- MPS: Hardin County MRA
- NRHP reference No.: 88001802
- Added to NRHP: October 4, 1988

The Historic First Presbyterian Church in Elizabethtown, Kentucky, was a historic church at 212 W. Dixie Avenue. It was added to the National Register of Historic Places in 1988.

It is a one-story brick church built in 1835 with Federal-style details. It was significantly modified in 1896, adding Romanesque style elements, including a bell tower. A two-story brick addition was added in 1943 and 1962.

The church moved to its current location at 1016 Pear Orchard Rd. in Elizabethtown in the early 1990s.

The building at 212 W. Dixie Avenue is currently occupied by the Kentucky High School Basketball Hall of Fame.
