= First Presbyterian Church (Bozeman, Montana) =

Historic church in Montana, United States

- U.S. National Register of Historic Places
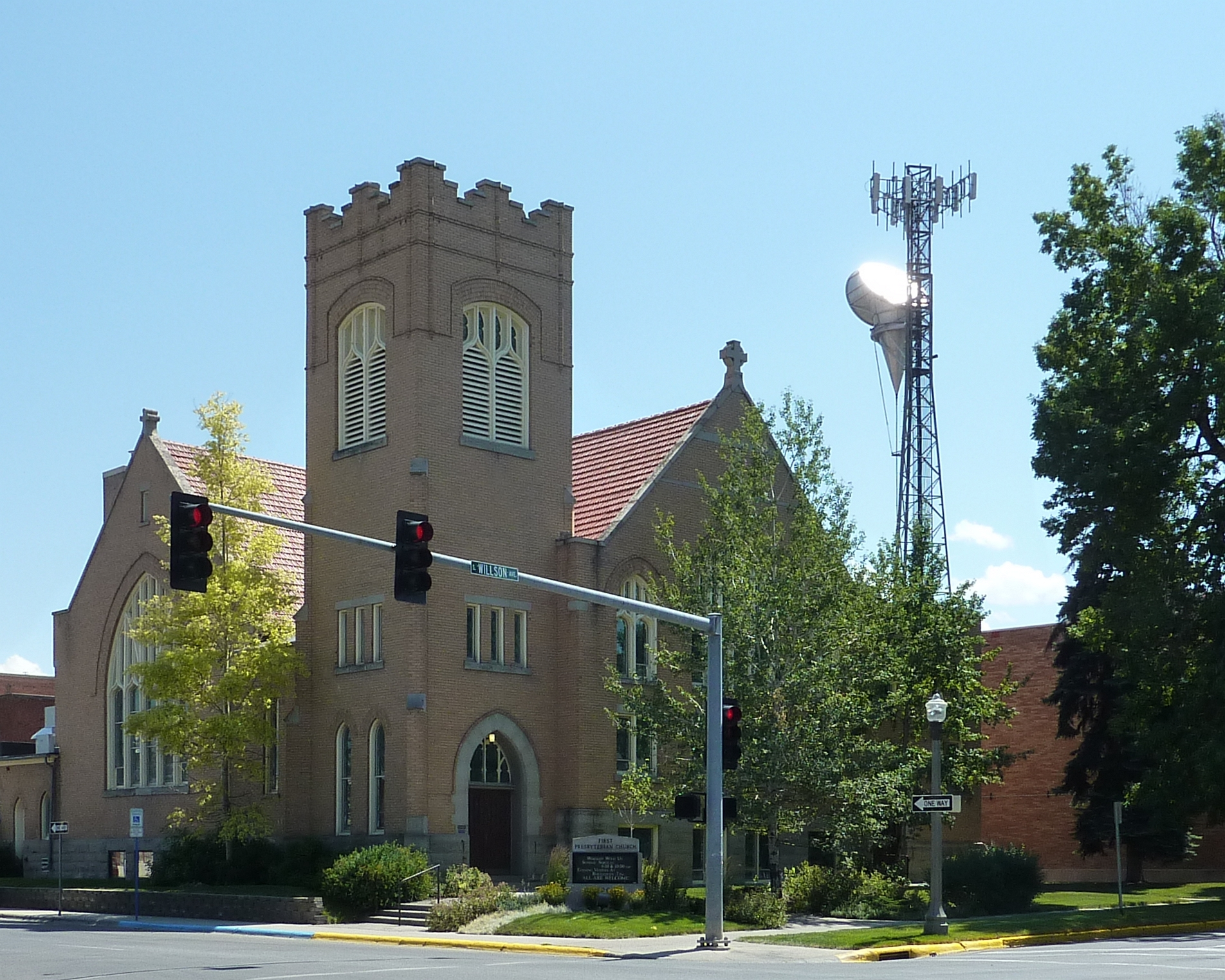

- Location within Montana Location within the United States
- Location: 26 W. Babcock, Bozeman, Montana
- Coordinates: 45°40′41″N 111°2′16″W
- Area: less than one acre
- Built: 1908-1910
- Built by: Frank Vreeland
- Architect: Turnbull & Jones
- Architectural style: Late Gothic Revival
- MPS: Bozeman MRA
- NRHP reference No.: 87001820
- Added to NRHP: December 21, 1987

First Presbyterian Church is a historic Presbyterian church building at 26 W. Babcock in Bozeman, Montana.

The Late Gothic Revival building was constructed during 1908-1910 and added to the National Register of Historic Places in 1989.

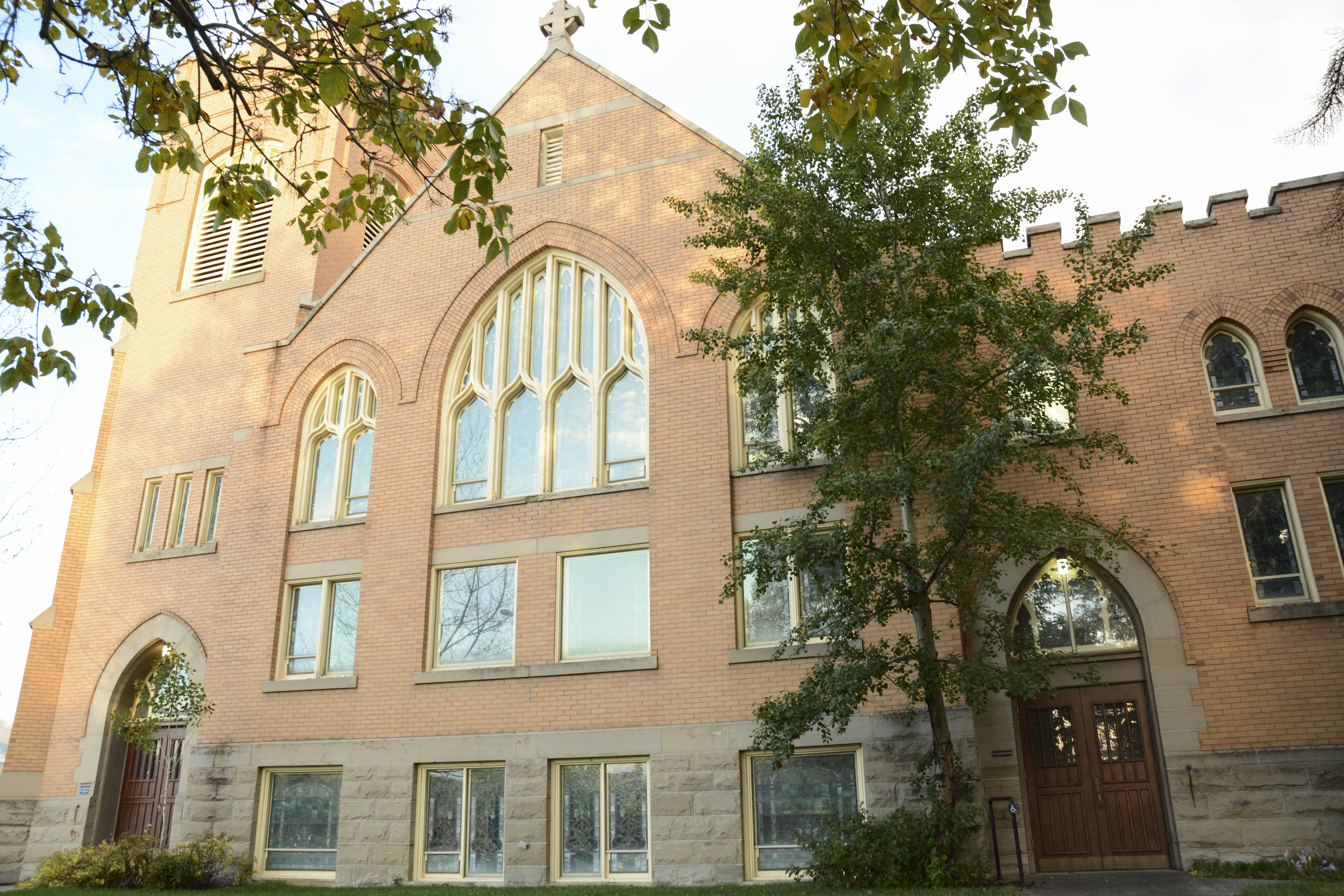
Another view of the church

It was designed by architects Turnbull & Jones of Elgin, Illinois; its construction was supervised by local contractor Frank Vreeland. Foundation stone was hauled by volunteers from a quarry in Bridger Canyon. After completion, it was dedicated on February 20, 1910.
