= First Presbyterian Church (McAlester, Oklahoma) =

First Presbyterian Church of McAlester

- (Former) First Presbyterian Church
- U.S. National Register of Historic Places
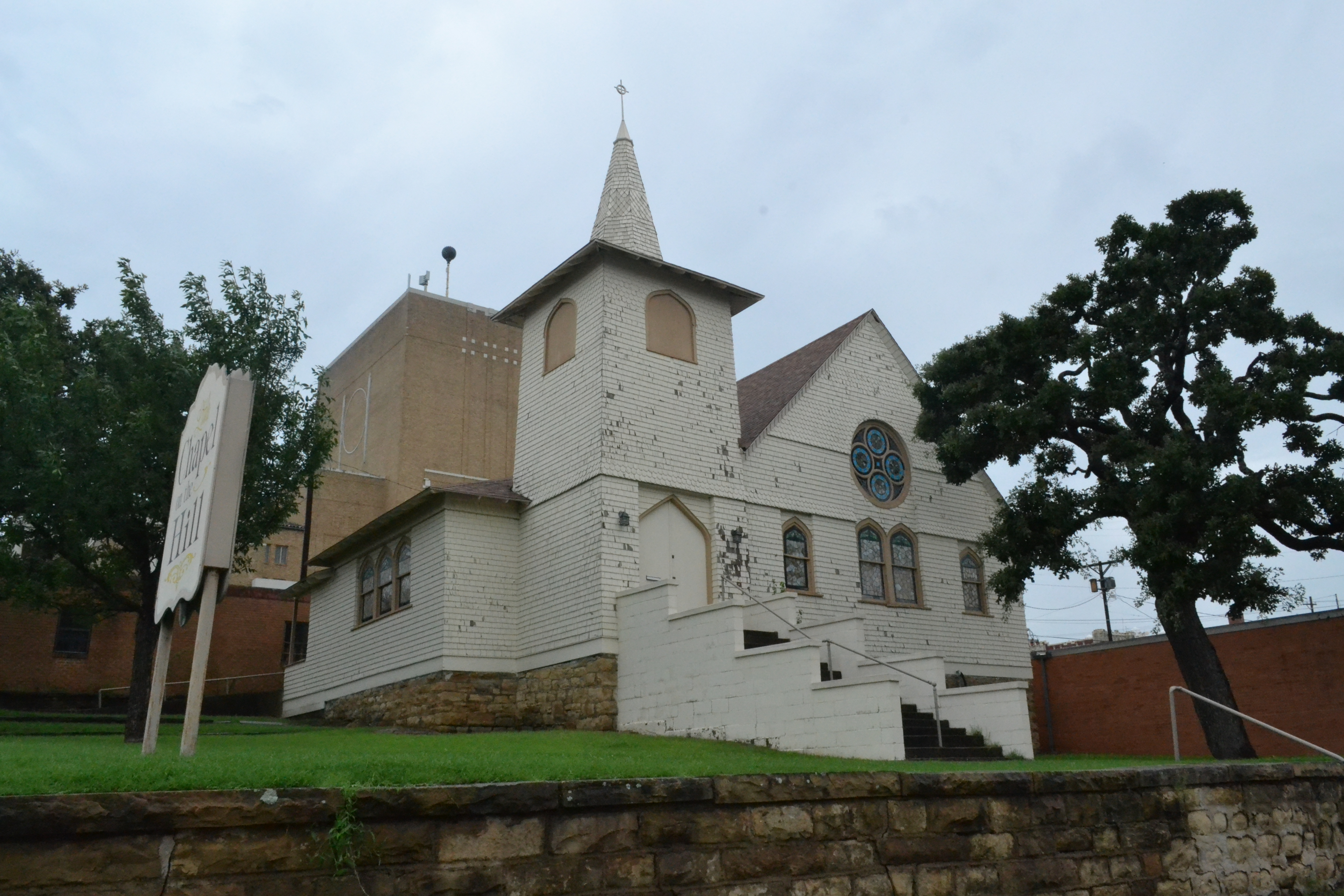
- The former First Presbyterian Church building, McAlester, Oklahoma is listed on the National Register of Historic Places. The congregation built a new church in the early 1900s located about a block away. The information below is about the historic church shown above.

- Location within Oklahoma Location within the United States
- Location: 101 E. Washington Avenue, McAlester, Oklahoma
- Area: 0.9 acres (0.36 ha)
- Built: 1895
- Architect: J. J. Walsh
- Architectural style: Shingle
- NRHP reference No.: 79003139
- Added to NRHP: December 11, 1979

First Presbyterian Church is a church building at 222 E. Washington Avenue in McAlester, Oklahoma. It was built in the early 1900's. Its predecessor building, a wooden structure at 101 E. Washington Avenue is listed on the National Register of Historic Places.

The current church building is a larger three-story brick building at the corner of E. Washington Avenue and 2nd Street. It serves as the congregational building for the First Presbyterian Church of McAlester with Sunday services at 10:55 am (weather permitting).

The current church is part of the Presbyterian Church (USA) Eastern Oklahoma Presbytery. The church pipe organ is a Reuter Organ Co. (Opus 1863,1975) and has 16 ranks.
