= First Presbyterian Church Manse (Clarksville, Tennessee) =

Historic church in Tennessee, United States

- U.S. National Register of Historic Places
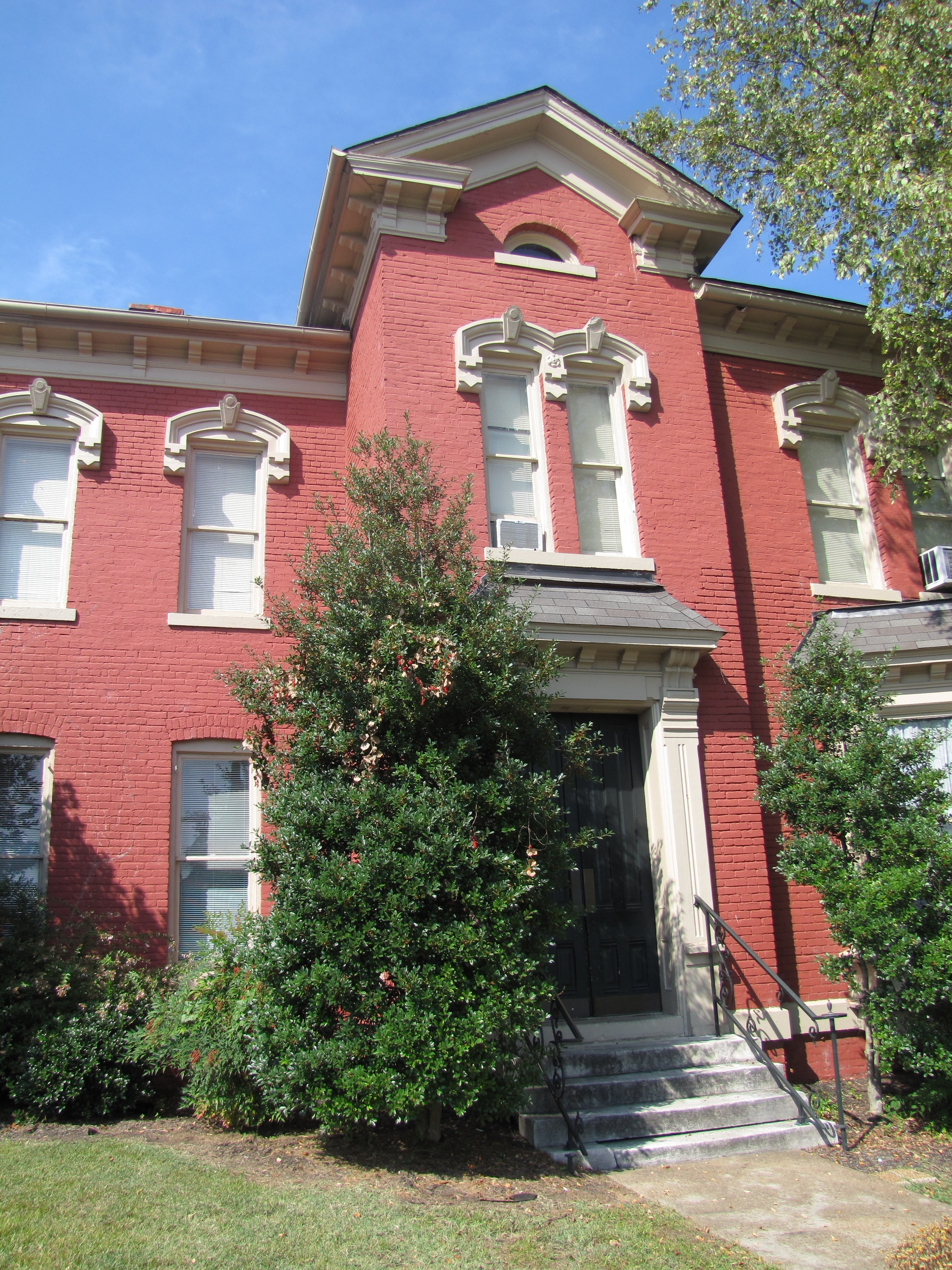

- Location within Tennessee Location within the United States
- Location: 305 Main St., Clarksville, Tennessee
- Coordinates: 36°31′45″N 87°21′28″W
- Area: less than one acre
- Built: 1890
- Architectural style: Italianate
- NRHP reference No.: 01000929
- Added to NRHP: August 31, 2001

First Presbyterian Church Manse (Farris Apartments) is a historic church manse at 305 Main Street in Clarksville, Tennessee.

It was built in 1890 and added to the National Register in 2001.
