= First Presbyterian Church Manse (North Little Rock, Arkansas) =

Historic house in Arkansas, United States

- U.S. National Register of Historic Places
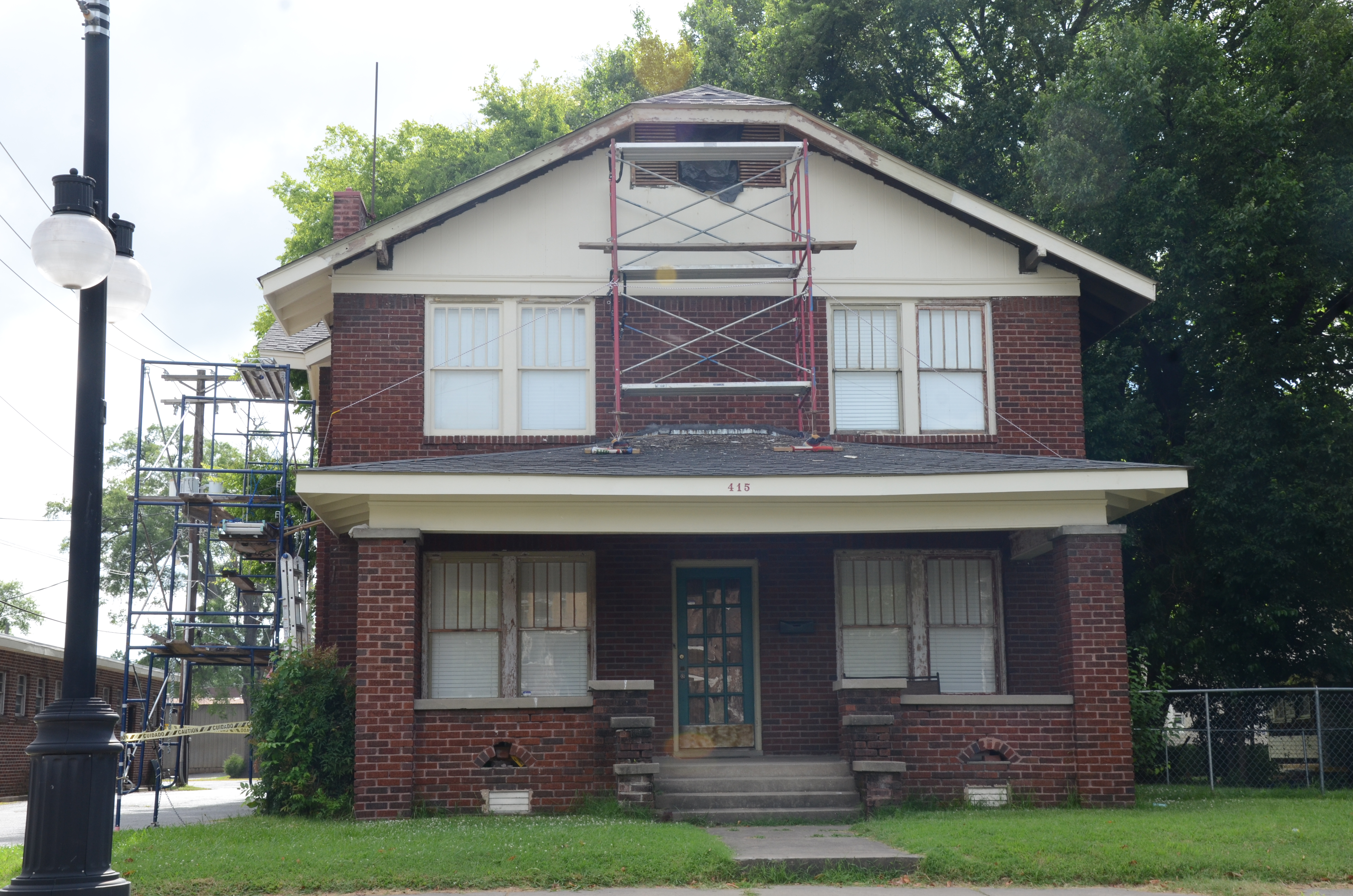

- Location within Arkansas Location within the United States
- Location: 415 N. Maple St., North Little Rock, Arkansas
- Coordinates: 34°45′30″N 92°16′9″W
- Area: less than one acre
- Built: 1927
- Architectural style: Bungalow/craftsman
- NRHP reference No.: 93001251
- Added to NRHP: November 19, 1993

The First Presbyterian Church Manse is a historic church parsonage at 415 North Maple Street in North Little Rock, Arkansas. It is a two-story brick-faced structure, with a clipped-gable roof that has wide eaves with Craftsman-style exposed rafter ends and large brackets. A porch extends across the front facade, supported at the ends by brick piers, with a low brick balustrade on either side of the entry stairs. The house was built in 1927 as the official residence of the North Little Rock First Presbyterian Church's pastor. It was used to house ministers until the 1960s, and has since served a variety of functions, including youth center and law office.

The building was listed on the National Register of Historic Places in 1993.

== See also ==
- National Register of Historic Places listings in Pulaski County, Arkansas
