= National Register of Historic Places listings in Floyd County, Virginia =

Location of Floyd County in Virginia

This is a list of the National Register of Historic Places listings in Floyd County, Virginia.

This is intended to be a complete list of the properties and districts on the National Register of Historic Places in Floyd County, Virginia, United States. The locations of National Register properties and districts for which the latitude and longitude coordinates are included below, may be seen in an online map.

There are 11 properties and districts listed on the National Register in the county, including 1 National Historic Landmark.

This National Park Service list is complete through NPS recent listings posted March 6, 2026.

== Current listings ==
	Name on the Register	Image	Date listed	Location	City or town	Description
1	Blue Ridge Parkway	Blue Ridge Parkway	December 13, 2024 (#100011353)	Blue Ridge Parkway through Virginia and North Carolina; 36°51′56″N 80°17′06″W	Floyd vicinity	
2	Buffalo Mountain Presbyterian Church and Cemetery	Buffalo Mountain Presbyterian Church and Cemetery	March 30, 2007 (#07000229)	2102 Childress Rd. 36°46′41″N 80°31′01″W	Willis	Church is in Carroll County; cemetery is in Floyd County
3	Floyd Historic District	Floyd Historic District	November 16, 2005 (#05001266)	Centered along Main and Osford Sts. between Penn Ave., and Baker St. and Sweeney and Nira St. 36°54′40″N 80°19′12″W	Floyd	
4	Floyd Presbyterian Church	Floyd Presbyterian Church	May 17, 1976 (#76002105)	U.S. Route 221; 36°54′41″N 80°19′05″W	Floyd	
5	Glenanna	Glenanna	May 16, 2002 (#02000523)	204 W. Main St. 36°54′41″N 80°19′19″W	Floyd	
6	Oakdale	Oakdale	March 17, 2010 (#10000090)	5773 Franklin Pike; 36°58′17″N 80°08′35″W	Floyd	
7	Phlegar Farm	Phlegar Farm	June 22, 2003 (#03000565)	Off Christiansburg Pike; 36°55′30″N 80°18′17″W	Floyd	
8	Roberson Mill		April 28, 2023 (#100008947)	1367 Roberson Mill Rd. SE; 36°51′44″N 80°19′13″W	Floyd vicinity	
9	Slate Mountain Presbyterian Church and Cemetery	Slate Mountain Presbyterian Church and Cemetery	March 30, 2007 (#07000227)	Rock Church Rd. 36°46′42″N 80°23′31″W	Meadows of Dan	
10	Willis Presbyterian Church and Cemetery	Willis Presbyterian Church and Cemetery	March 30, 2007 (#07000226)	5733 Floyd Highway, S. 36°51′22″N 80°29′07″W	Willis	
11	West Fork Furnace	West Fork Furnace	June 5, 2009 (#09000414)	Old Furnace Rd. 36°50′03″N 80°22′31″W	Floyd	

== See also ==
- List of National Historic Landmarks in Virginia
- National Register of Historic Places listings in Virginia
