= Dinwiddie Presbyterian Church and Cemetery =

Historic church in Virginia, United States

- U.S. National Register of Historic Places
- Virginia Landmarks Register
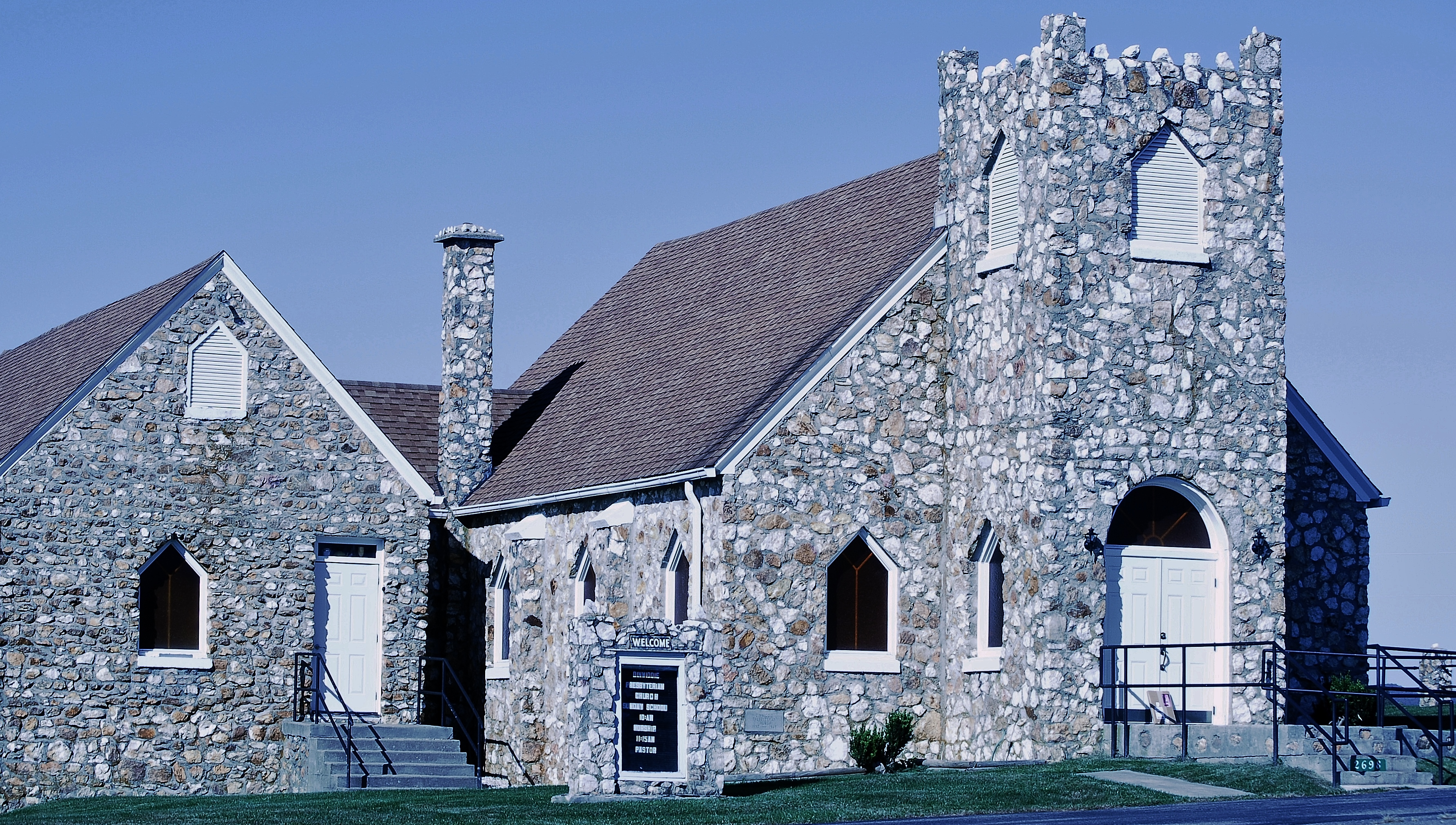

- Location within Virginia Location within the United States
- Location: 2698 Homestead Rd. Hillsville, Virginia
- Coordinates: 36°51′46″N 80°43′05″W
- Area: 1.2 acres (0.49 ha)
- Built: 1948
- Architect: Childress, Rev. Robert; Slate, Richard
- Architectural style: Gothic Revival
- MPS: Reverend Robert Childress Presbyterian Churches MPS
- NRHP reference No.: 07000228
- VLR No.: 017-5015

Significant dates
- Added to NRHP: March 30, 2007
- Designated VLR: December 6, 2006

Dinwiddie Presbyterian Church and Cemetery is a historic Presbyterian church located near Hillsville, Carroll County, Virginia. It was one of the six "rock churches" founded by Bob Childress It was built in 1948, and is a white quartz rock-faced frame building. The main block is front-gabled with nave plan and Gothic-style tower at the front, through which the edifice is entered. The tower has corner parapets with crenellations of jagged, light-colored stone fragments between each corner. Attached to the main block is a 1 1/2-story, front-gabled addition. The contributing cemetery is enclosed by white quartz pillars connected by black pipes.

It was added to the National Register of Historic Places in 2007.

== See also ==
- Bluemont Presbyterian Church and Cemetery
- Buffalo Mountain Presbyterian Church and Cemetery
- Mayberry Presbyterian Church
- Slate Mountain Presbyterian Church and Cemetery
- Willis Presbyterian Church and Cemetery
