= Ridgeview High School =

Ridgeview High School may refer to:

- Ridgeview High School (Bakersfield, California), Bakersfield, California
- Ridgeview High School (Magalia, California), Magalia, California
- Ridgeview High School (Florida), Orange Park, Florida
- Ridgeview High School (Illinois), Colfax, Illinois
- Ridgeview High School (Redmond, Oregon)
- Ridgeview High School (Clintwood, Virginia), formed in the 2015-2016 school year by merger of Clintwood High School, Haysi High School, and Ervinton High School

== See also ==
- Ridge View High School, Columbia, South Carolina
- Ridge View Secondary College, Baldivis, Western Australia
- Ridgevue High School, Nampa, Idaho, United States
