= Crooked Road (Virginia) =

The Crooked Road is a heritage trail in Southwest Virginia, that explores the musical history of the region along southwestern Virginia's Blue Ridge and Cumberland Mountains. The Crooked Road winds through almost 300 miles of scenic terrain in southwestern Virginia, including 19 counties, four cities, and 54 towns.

== Musical heritage ==
The Crooked Road celebrates the musical heritage of Western Virginia and Southwest Virginia with Appalachian music including Old-time music, Folk music, and Bluegrass music. It also celebrates traditional dance such as clogging, buck dancing, Square dance and other traditional dances, singing and music. There are major venues to showcase The Crooked Road, including the Heartwood – The Southwest Virginia Artisan Gateway in Abingdon, Virginia, the Ralph Stanley Museum in Clintwood, Virginia, the Carter Family Fold in Scott County, Virginia, the Birthplace of Country Music Museum in Bristol, Virginia, the Blue Ridge Music Center off the Blue Ridge Parkway, County Sales and the Floyd Country Store in Floyd, Virginia, and the Blue Ridge Institute & Museum at Ferrum College.

== Origins ==
The idea for Virginia's "Crooked Road" began to germinate in the minds of Virginians in January 2003. A number of public officials, musicians, and others were interested in an economic development strategy for the Appalachian region of Southwest Virginia, and they wanted to draw on the region's rich musical heritage. Over time, the project grew, and today The Crooked Road and its affiliated venues span 19 counties.

== Route ==
The Crooked Road starts in and goes through Southwest Virginia from Rocky Mount, Virginia to Breaks Interstate Park on the Virginia border. The marked route passes through Franklin, Floyd, Patrick, Carroll, Grayson, Washington, Scott, Lee, Wise and Dickinson counties. Major venues along the route are located in Ferrum, Floyd, Galax, Abingdon, Bristol, Hiltons, Norton, and Clintwood. Affiliated venues are also located in nine neighboring counties and several independent cities.

== Bibliography ==
- Abraham, Michael. Harmonic Highways: Motorcycling Virginia's Crooked Road. Blacksburg, Va: Pocahontas Press, 2011. 303 pages : illustrations, maps, portraits.
- Chaney, Ryan. 2013. "Straightening the Crooked Road". Ethnography. 14, no. 4: 387-411.
- The Crooked Road: Virginia's Heritage Music Trail. The Crooked Road, n.d.
- Crooked Road: Virginia's Heritage Music Trail. The Crooked Road: A Treasury of American Music. Abingdon, Va: The Crooked Road, 2011. Summary: The 50 songs and tunes collected here were selected from CD recordings currently being sold by artists who live along The Crooked Road in Southwest Virginia's Blue Ridge and Cumberland Mountains.
- Going Down the Crooked Road. Roanoke, Va: Roanoke Times, 2005.
- McNeill, Kylene Barker, et al. Christmas Along the Crooked Road. 2007. Summary: "Features stellar musicians from Southwest Virginia and Northwest North Carolina performing some of their favorite holiday songs, new and old in bluegrass, oldtime and mountain style." Notes by Kylene Barker McNeill and Debbie Robinson, biographical information about the musicians, credits and durations on container insert.
- National Council for the Traditional Arts. Music from the Crooked Road: Mountain Music of Virginia: a National Tour Celebrating the Living Musical Culture of Southwest Virginia. Silver Spring, MD: NCTA, 2006. Notes: Presented with major support from: the Crooked Road Virginia's heritage music trail, the Virginia Tourism Corporation, the National Endowment for the Arts. "A national tour of old-time, bluegrass, mountain gospel and flatfoot dance featuring: Sammy Shelor, Wayne Henderson, the Whitetop Mountain Band, Elizabeth Laprelle, Kirk Sutphin & Eddie bond, No speed limit".
- Saffle, Michael. 2014. "Perpetuating the Culture of Musical Memories: Virginia's Crooked Road". Musik Und Erinnern. 309-322.
- Skeens, Betty, and Libby Bondurant. Grazing Along the Crooked Road: Recipes and Stories--Past and Present. Pounding Mill, Va: Henderson Publishing, 2009. Notes: "First edition October 2008. Second edition April 2009." Map of "The Crooked Road: Virginia's Heritage Music Trail" on lining papers. "In Memory of Betty Skeens."
- Thornton, Tim. 2010. "Blazing New Trails: The Crooked Road Offers a Model for Promoting a Scenic Region". Virginia Business. 25, no. 8: 80-83.
- Virginia's Heritage Music Trail. The Crooked Road: Virginia's Heritage Music Trail. Abingdon, Va: Virginia's Heritage Music Trail, 2011. Notes: Cover title. "Visitor guide."—Cover. "A place of beauty- a place of song. This is the Crooked Road ... an authentic music that has been preserved by the region's musicians for generations."
