= Slate Mountain Presbyterian Church and Cemetery =

Historic site in Patrick County, Virginia, US

- U.S. National Register of Historic Places
- Virginia Landmarks Register
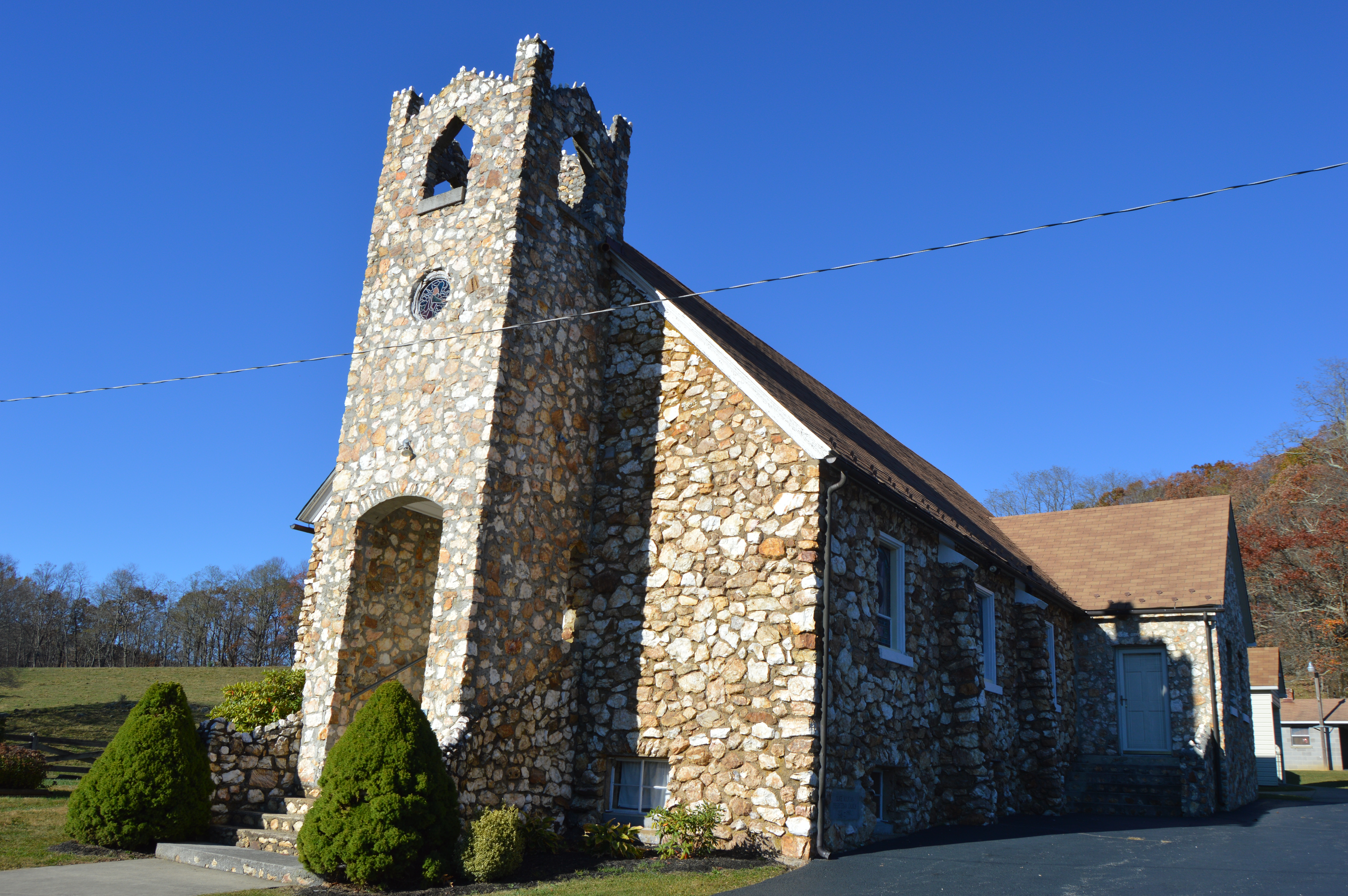
- Front and eastern side

- Location within Virginia Location within the United States
- Location: 149 Rock Church Road, Meadows of Dan, Virginia
- Coordinates: 36°46′41.8″N 80°23′33.3″W
- Area: 1 acre (0.40 ha)
- Built: 1932
- Architectural style: Gothic Revival
- MPS: Reverend Robert Childress Presbyterian Churches MPS
- NRHP reference No.: 07000227
- VLR No.: 031-5005

Significant dates
- Added to NRHP: March 30, 2007
- Designated VLR: December 6, 2006

Slate Mountain Presbyterian Church and Cemetery is a historic Presbyterian church and cemetery in Patrick County, Virginia. It was built in 1932, and is one of six "rock churches" founded by Bob Childress and built between 1919 and the early 1950s. The building consists of a one-story, gable-fronted rectangular form with a roughly square, Gothic Revival bell tower centered on the building's front elevation. The building was erected on a concrete block foundation, and has walls of light wood framing covered with a thick quartz and quartzite fieldstone exterior veneer.

It was listed on the National Register of Historic Places in 2007.

== See also ==
- Bluemont Presbyterian Church and Cemetery
- Buffalo Mountain Presbyterian Church and Cemetery
- Dinwiddie Presbyterian Church and Cemetery
- Mayberry Presbyterian Church
- Willis Presbyterian Church and Cemetery
