= Hartwood (disambiguation) =

Hartwood is a village in Scotland.

Hartwood may also refer to:

- Hartwood, Ohio, an unincorporated community
- Hartwood, Virginia, an unincorporated community

== See also ==
- Heartwood (disambiguation)
