= Bob Childress =

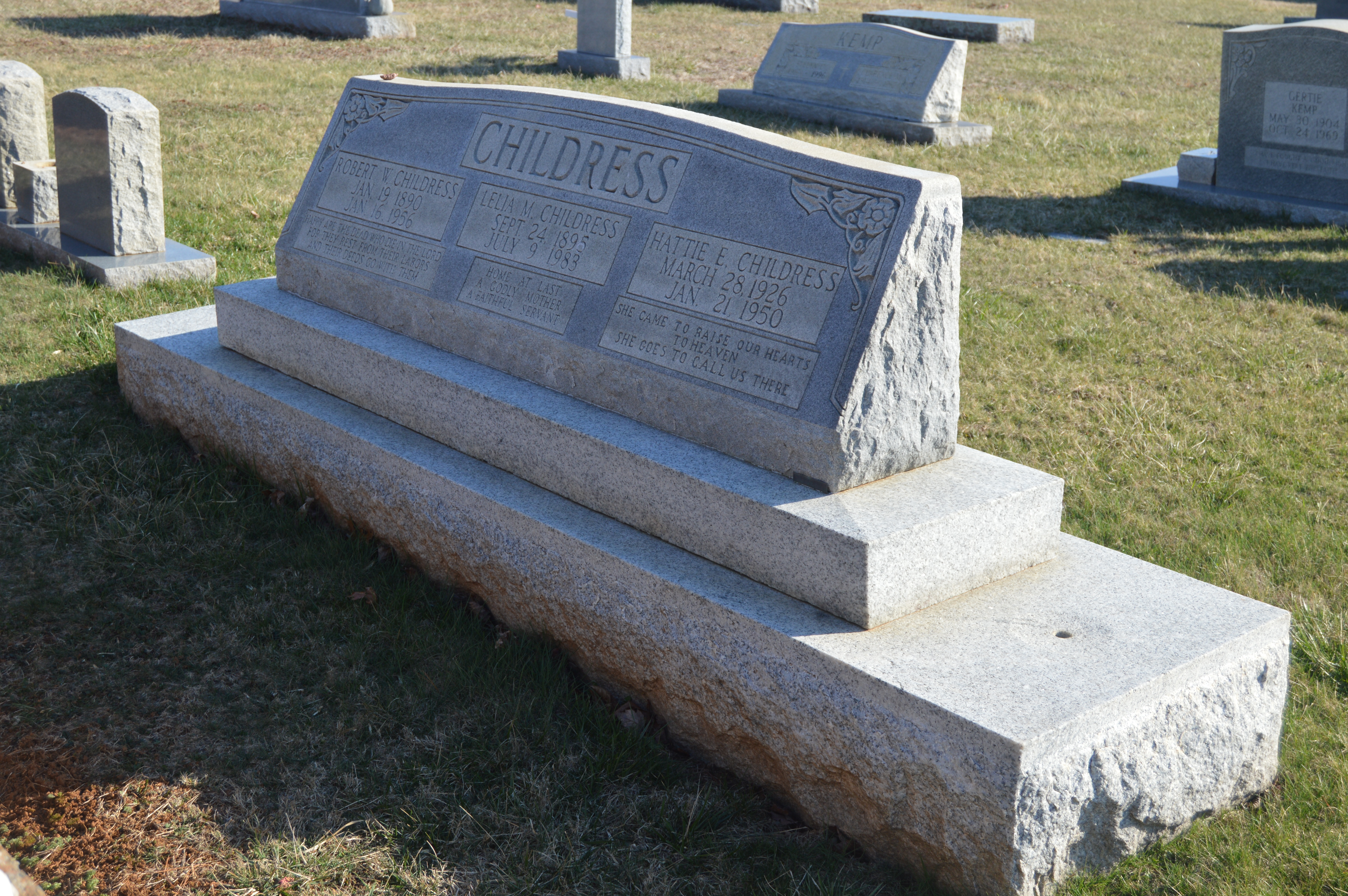
Gravestone at Buffalo Mountain

Robert "Bob" Walter Childress (January 19, 1889 or January 19, 1890 – January 16, 1956) was a Presbyterian minister who was born in "The Hollow," now Ararat, Virginia, and grew up surrounded by the Primitive Baptist tradition. He became known throughout the Southern Appalachian region for his work to transform the region's culture of violence and promote basic education. He was also the founder of the famous "Rock Churches" of Floyd, Patrick and Carroll counties in Virginia.

== Early life ==
As a young man Childress witnessed and was caught up in the violence, alcoholism and ignorance of his impoverished and then isolated Buffalo Mountain community. He claimed that his earliest memory was of his mother nursing his illnesses by holding a whisky-soaked rag to his mouth. Unable to attend school for much of his childhood he often resorted to violence and began drinking heavily. But upon witnessing a massacre at a courthouse, he vowed to quit drinking and entered law enforcement. Eventually he got married and had children. After a chance visit to a Presbyterian church, he began attending regularly and soon realized that he wanted to become a minister. He returned to high school at the age of 30 in the same one-room school as his 6-year-old son.

== Ministry ==
After getting a high school diploma while studying alongside his son in a one room classroom, Childress enlisted the help of his local minister to gain entry into the Union Theological Seminary in Richmond, Virginia and was ordained a Presbyterian minister in 1926. He soon became known for his very warm and personal preaching style and was in demand by established churches throughout Virginia and the Eastern United States. His desire however was to return to his Appalachian community to help eradicate the violence and ignorance that was so pervasive. Through his 30 years of ministry he built and led congregations at six famous “Rock Churches” of which five of remain in the towns of Meadows of Dan, Bluemont, Buffalo Mountain, Slate Mountain, Dinwiddie and Willis. All but the Willis church remain in use by Presbyterian congregations. In 2007, the Churches were listed in the National Register of Historic Places as the Reverend Robert Childress Presbyterian Churches Multiple Property Document (MPD).

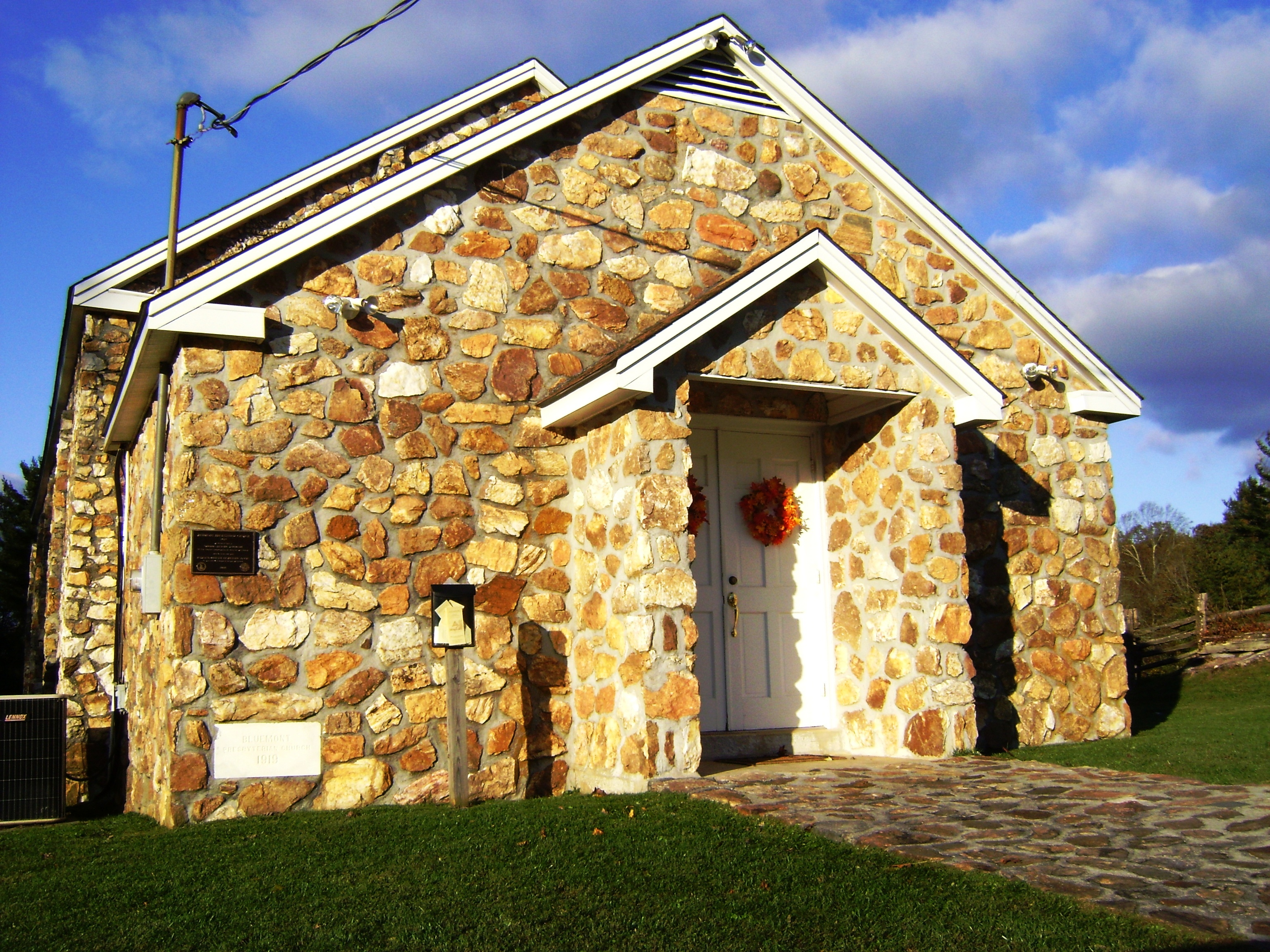
Bluemont Presbyterian Church

His congregations did much to bring education and economic development to the Buffalo Mountain area of Floyd County, Virginia.

In the 1950s Childress was leading services in fourteen churches a week and traveling tens of thousands of miles a year. The Synod of Virginia noted that “Only eternity will tell the tremendous good accomplished in this unusual diocese.” Childress died of a heart attack in Roanoke in 1956 at the age of 67.

His life was chronicled in a book titled The Man Who Moved a Mountain (Richard C. Davids, 1970). His unfinished autobiography, and biographies of his eight children are published in Childress Cousins: From the Hills and Hollows of Southern Virginia

== See also ==
- Sites on the Reverend Robert Childress Presbyterian Churches MPS:
  - Bluemont Presbyterian Church and Cemetery
  - Buffalo Mountain Presbyterian Church and Cemetery
  - Dinwiddie Presbyterian Church and Cemetery
  - Mayberry Presbyterian Church
  - Slate Mountain Presbyterian Church and Cemetery
  - Willis Presbyterian Church and Cemetery
- Appalachia
