= Donna Polseno =

American artist

- Education: Kansas City Art Institute, Rhode Island School of Design
- Known for: Pottery, ceramics, sculpture
- Style: Contemporary

Donna Polseno is a contemporary American visual artist known for pottery, ceramics, and sculpture.

== Background ==
Donna Polseno earned her Bachelor of Fine Arts (1972) at the Kansas City Art Institute and her Master of Arts in Teaching (1974) at the Rhode Island School of Design. She lives and works in Floyd, Virginia and teaches ceramics at Hollins University in Roanoke, Virginia. Polseno is a founding member of the 16 Hands Studio Tour and director of the Women Working with Clay Symposium.

== Selected solo and group exhibitions ==
- 16 Hands Studio Tour, held annually. Floyd, VA
- Embodied Form, 2018. List Gallery at Swarthmore College, Swarthmore, PA
- Reverences, 2009. Taubman Museum of Art, Roanoke, VA
- For the Love of Flowers, 2005. Kentucky Museum of Art and Craft, Louisville, KY
- Biennial of Piedmont Crafts, 1978. Mint Museum of Art, Charlotte, NC

== Collections and publications ==
- American Museum of Ceramic Art, Pomona, CA
- Ceramics Monthly, March 1990, November 2015
