= Cockram Mill =

- U.S. National Register of Historic Places
- Virginia Landmarks Register
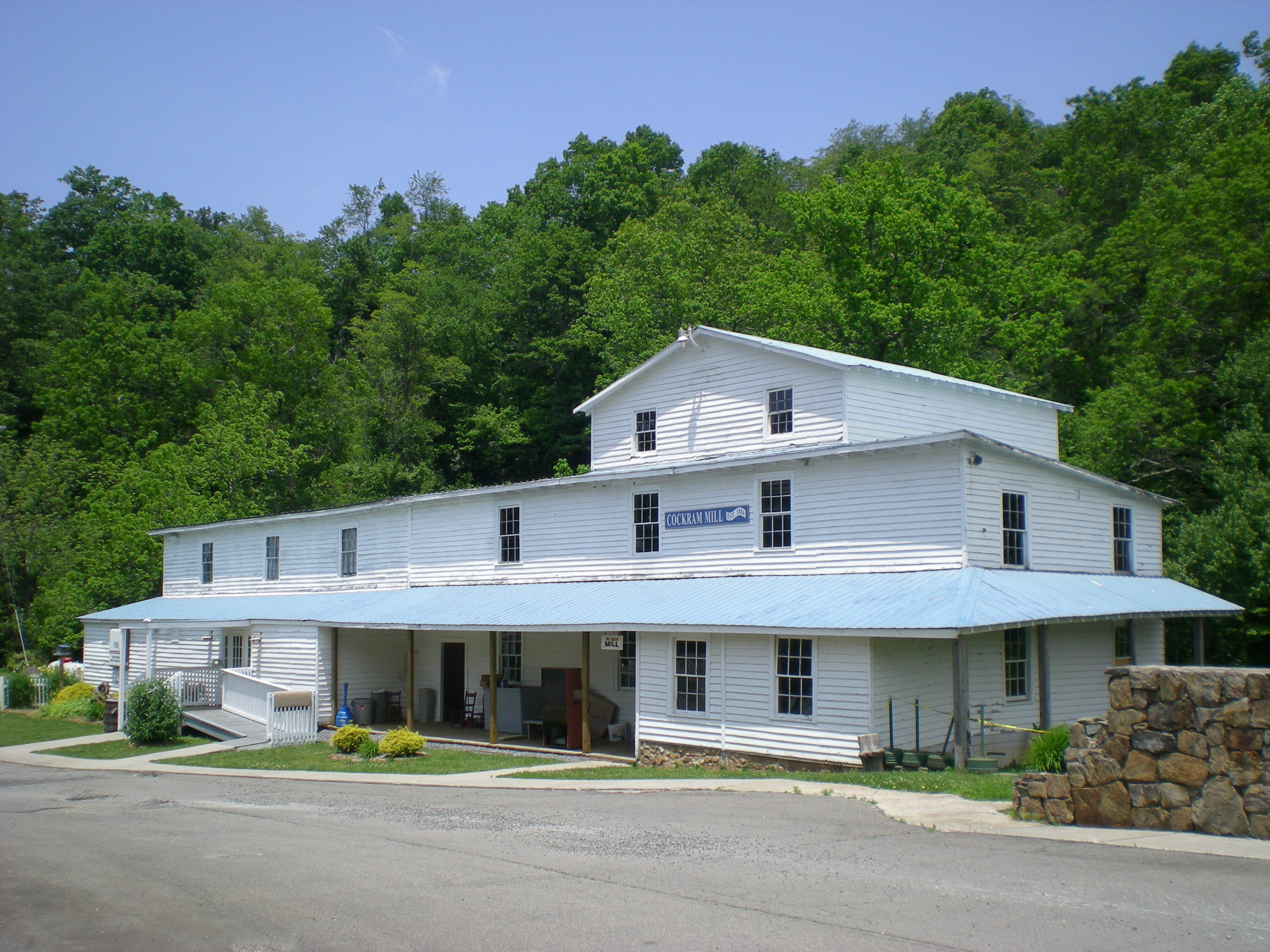

- Location within Virginia Location within the United States
- Location: US 58 E of jct. with VA 632, near Meadows of Dan, Virginia
- Coordinates: 36°44′13″N 80°22′49″W
- Area: 13 acres (5.3 ha)
- Built: c. 1885, c. 1921
- Built by: Blackard, Jesse
- NRHP reference No.: 90001842
- VLR No.: 070-0006

Significant dates
- Added to NRHP: December 6, 1990
- Designated VLR: October 16, 1990

Cockram Mill is a historic grist mill complex located near Meadows of Dan, Patrick County, Virginia. The mill dates to about 1885, and is a two- and three-story, rectangular frame building on a concrete foundation. It measures 111 feet by 24 feet and is located adjacent to a concrete dam on the headwaters of the Dan River. The mill is operated by two metal turbine wheels, 14 feet and 16 feet in diameter. Associated with the mill is the contributing miller's house built about 1921.

It was listed on the National Register of Historic Places in 1990.
