= Heartwood (disambiguation) =

Heartwood is wood nearer the pith of a stem or branch, different in colour from sapwood.

Heartwood may also refer to:

- Heartwood Forest, which, when complete, will be the largest new native forest in England
- Heartwood – The Southwest Virginia Artisan Gateway, a building in Virginia, United States
- Heartwood (film), a 1998 American film starring Jason Robards
- Heartwood (novel), a 2025 American novel by Amity Gaige
