= Ralph Stanley Museum =

Coordinates: 37.1499°N 82.4573°W

The Ralph Stanley Museum
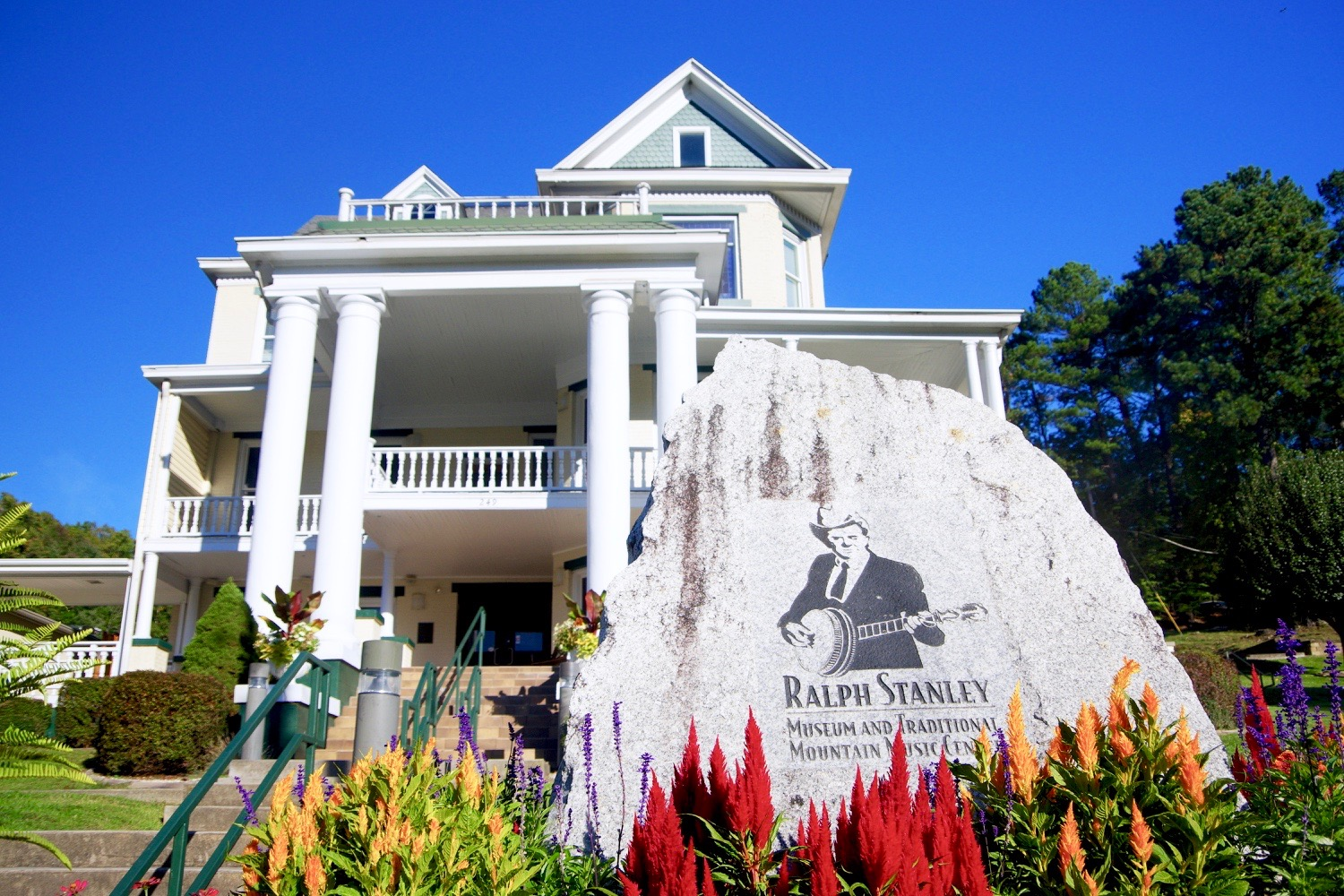
- Ralph Stanley Museum in 2020
- Established: October 2004
- Location: 249 Main St., Clintwood, Virginia

The Ralph Stanley Museum is a museum in Clintwood, Virginia dedicated to Ralph Edmond Stanley, an American bluegrass musician known for his distinctive singing and banjo playing.

== History and description ==
The museum opened in October 2004, in Clintwood, Virginia (close to McClure, Virginia, where Stanley was born). The Museum is housed in the Chase House, which has been an historic landmark in Dickenson County since its construction in 1903. It is also accompanied by a Traditional Mountain Music Center, also known as the Dickenson County Community Center, where private parties and meetings can be held.

The museum is one of the venues of Crooked Road, Virginia, on Virginia's Heritage Music Trail, which is designed to generate tourism and economic development in the Appalachian region of Southwestern Virginia by focusing on the region's unique musical heritage. The vision for the museum and music center is to preserve and promote mountain and Bluegrass music with workshops, seminars, and conventions.

The museum is decorated to look more subjective, including the front desk which looks like an oversized banjo. The museum describes many of Stanley's travels and contains some of his older possessions, including instruments and journals.

== See also ==
- List of music museums
