= Bluemont Presbyterian Church and Cemetery =

Historic site in Patrick County, Virginia, US

- U.S. National Register of Historic Places
- Virginia Landmarks Register
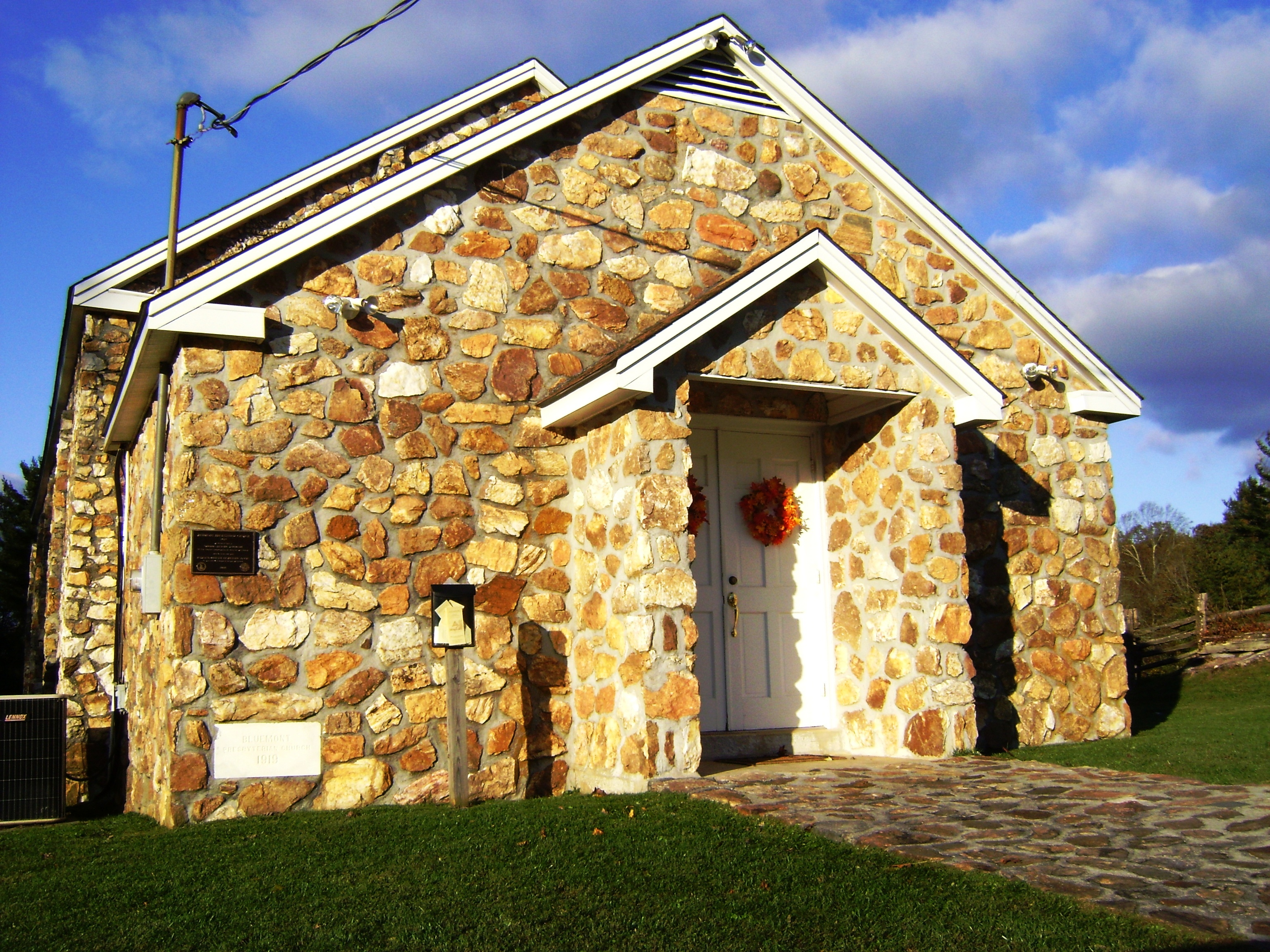
- Bluemont Presbyterian Church, October 2009

- Location within Virginia Location within the United States
- Location: Blue Ridge Pkwy, Mile Post No. 192, near Fancy Gap, Virginia
- Coordinates: 36°39′27″N 80°34′22″W
- Area: 1.2 acres (0.49 ha)
- Built: org. 1920 1945, 1946
- Architect: Childress, Rev. Robert; Slate, Richard
- Architectural style: Gothic Revival
- MPS: Reverend Robert Childress Presbyterian Churches MPS
- NRHP reference No.: 07000219
- VLR No.: 070-5044

Significant dates
- Added to NRHP: March 30, 2007
- Designated VLR: December 6, 2006

Bluemont Presbyterian Church and Cemetery is a historic Presbyterian church located near Fancy Gap, Patrick County, Virginia. It is one of the "rock churches" founded by Bob Childress. It was built between 1919 and 1950, and is a small frame church building faced in natural quartz and quartzite stone. It features a Gothic styled hexagonal bell tower. The rock facing was added to the frame building in 1946.

It was listed on the National Register of Historic Places in 2007.

== See also ==
- Buffalo Mountain Presbyterian Church and Cemetery
- Mayberry Presbyterian Church
- Slate Mountain Presbyterian Church and Cemetery
- Willis Presbyterian Church and Cemetery
