= Buffalo Mountain Presbyterian Church and Cemetery =

Historic church in Virginia, United States

- U.S. National Register of Historic Places
- Virginia Landmarks Register
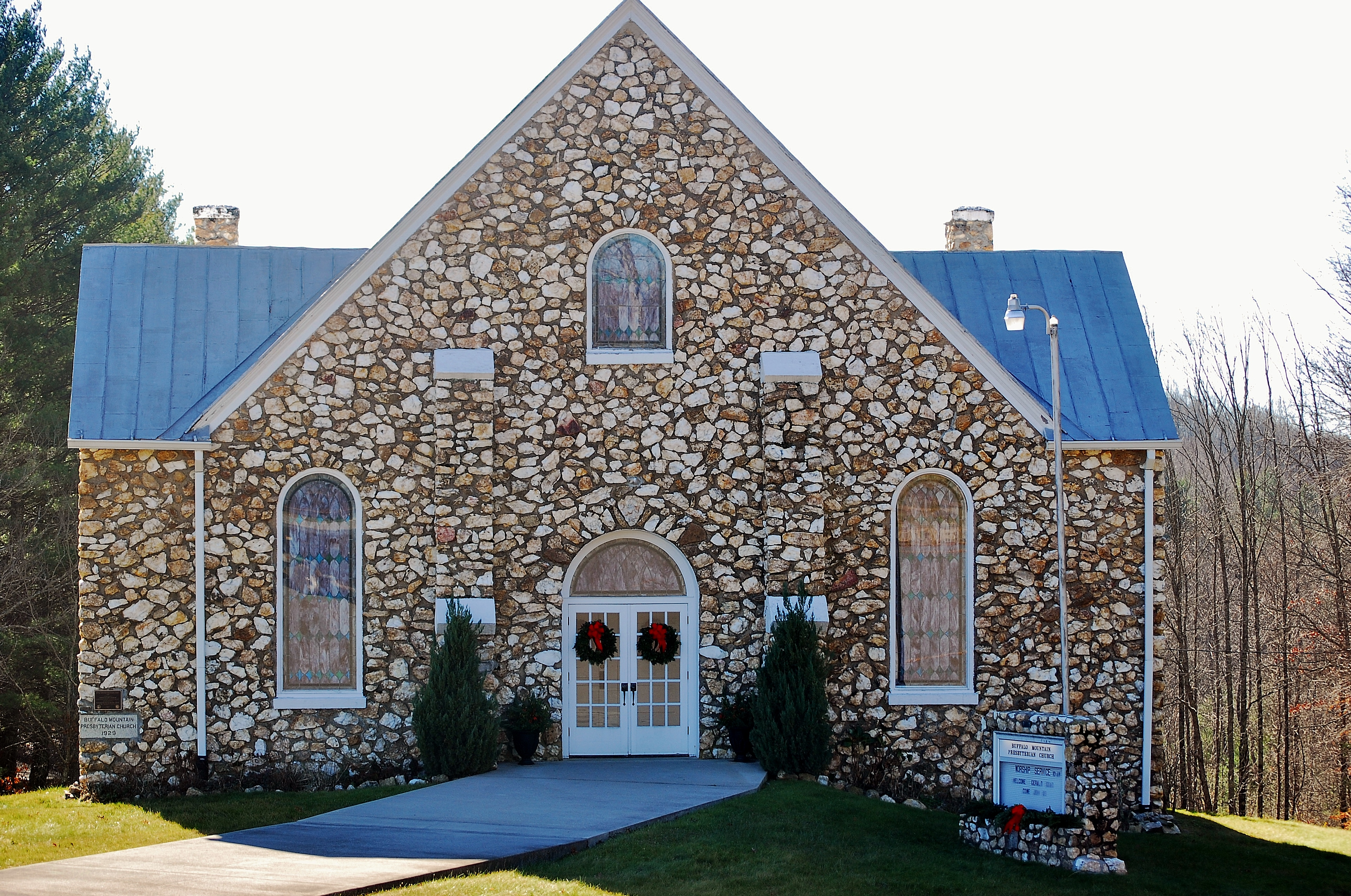

- Location within Virginia Location within the United States
- Location: 2102 Childress Rd., near Willis, Virginia
- Coordinates: 36°46′39″N 80°31′03″W
- Area: 3.2 acres (1.3 ha)
- Built: 1929
- Architectural style: Greek Revival
- MPS: Reverend Robert Childress Presbyterian Churches MPS
- NRHP reference No.: 07000229
- VLR No.: 017-5016

Significant dates
- Added to NRHP: March 30, 2007
- Designated VLR: December 6, 2006

Buffalo Mountain Presbyterian Church and Cemetery is a historic Presbyterian church located near Willis, Floyd County, Virginia. It was the first of the 5 "rock churches" founded by Bob Childress. It was built in 1929, and is a rock-faced frame building with a nave plan and front and rear transepts. The nave measures 33 feet wide and 80 feet long. It has a steeply pitched gable roof covered with standing seam sheet metal. The contributing Cemetery has a continuous wall of mortared quartzitic fieldstones, matching the church exterior.

It was added to the National Register of Historic Places in 2007.

== See also ==
- Bluemont Presbyterian Church and Cemetery
- Dinwiddie Presbyterian Church and Cemetery
- Slate Mountain Presbyterian Church and Cemetery
- Willis Presbyterian Church and Cemetery
