= Dickenson County Courthouse =

Historic courthouse in Virginia, US

- U.S. National Register of Historic Places
- Virginia Landmarks Register
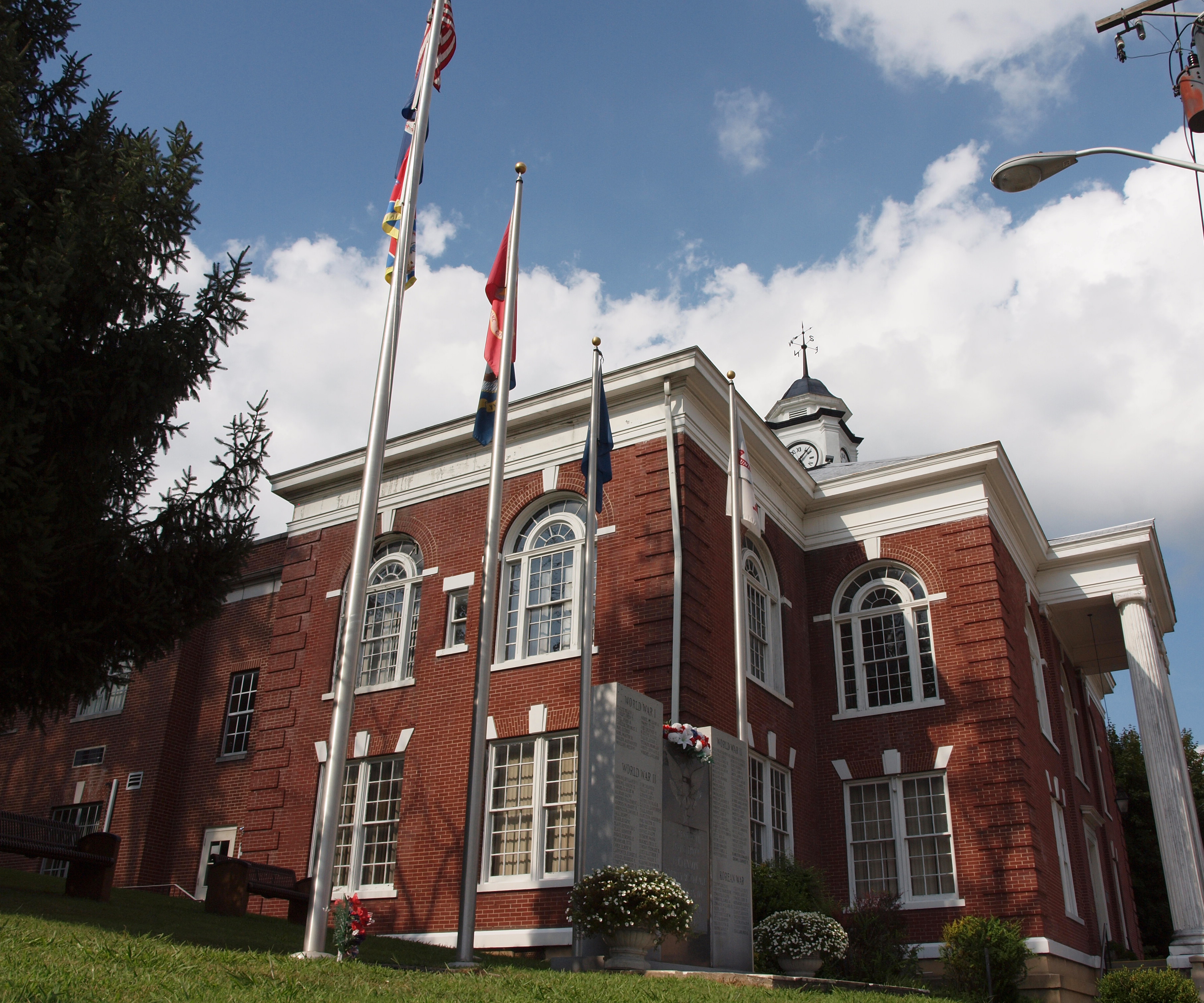

- Location within Virginia Location within the United States
- Location: Main and McClure Sts., Clintwood, Virginia
- Coordinates: 37°9′0″N 82°27′25″W
- Area: 0.5 acres (0.20 ha)
- Built: 1915, 1972
- Architect: Miller, H.M.
- Architectural style: Colonial Revival
- NRHP reference No.: 82004553
- VLR No.: 196-0001

Significant dates
- Added to NRHP: September 16, 1982
- Designated VLR: July 20, 1982

The Dickenson County Courthouse is a historic courthouse building located at Clintwood, Dickenson County, Virginia. It was built in 1915, as an extension of the 1894 brick courthouse. It is a two-story, Colonial Revival building with a projecting central block and wings. It features a two-story portico with paired Ionic order columns, Palladian windows, and a slate-shingled hipped roof crowned by a domed clock tower. The 1894 brick courthouse was replaced in 1972.

It was listed on the National Register of Historic Places in 1982.
