= Justin Hamilton (safety) =

American football player and coach (born 1982)

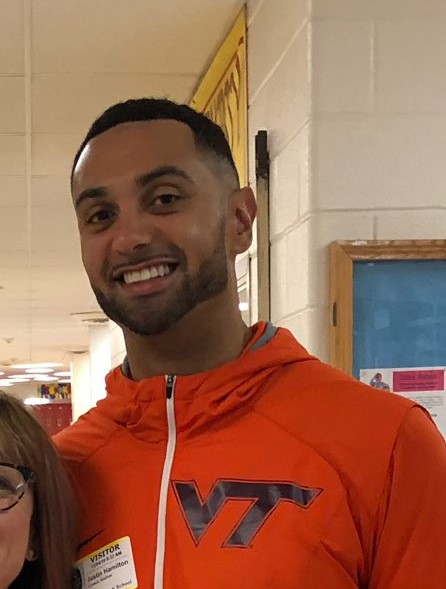

New England Patriots
- Title: Cornerbacks coach

Personal information
- Born: September 17, 1982 (age 44); Norton, Virginia, U.S.
- Listed height: 6 ft 3 in (1.91 m)
- Listed weight: 217 lb (98 kg)

Career information
- Position: Running back (No. 25, 32)
- High school: Clintwood (Clintwood, Virginia)
- College: Virginia Tech
- NFL draft: 2006: 7th round, 222nd overall pick

Career history

Playing
- Cleveland Browns (2006); Washington Redskins (2008)

Coaching
- Virginia–Wise (2011–2013) Defensive coordinator; VMI (2014–2016) Outside linebackers coach; VMI (2017) Inside linebackers coach; Virginia Tech (2018) Director of player development – defense; Virginia Tech (2019) Safeties coach; Virginia Tech (2020–2021) Defensive coordinator & safeties coach; Tennessee Titans (2023) Defensive quality control coach; Indianapolis Colts (2024) Assistant defensive backs coach; New England Patriots (2025–present) Cornerbacks coach

Career NFL statistics
- Total tackles: 16
- Stats at Pro Football Reference

Justin Lee Hamilton (born September 17, 1982) is an American football coach and former player who is the cornerbacks coach for the New England Patriots of the National Football League (NFL). He was selected by the Cleveland Browns in the seventh round of the 2006 NFL draft. He played college football for the Virginia Tech Hokies and also served as their defensive coordinator in 2020 and 2021.

== Early life ==
Hamilton played high school football at Clintwood High School in Clintwood, Virginia, as a tailback.

== College career ==
During his college career, Hamilton played wide receiver, tailback, and free safety for the Virginia Tech Hokies.

== Professional career ==
Pre-draft measurables
Height	Weight	40-yard dash	20-yard shuttle	Three-cone drill	Vertical jump	Broad jump	Bench press
6 ft 3 1/8 in (1.91 m)	218 lb (99 kg)	4.52 s	4.04 s	6.65 s	43.0 in (1.09 m)	10 ft 6 in (3.20 m)	19 reps
All values from Pro Day

=== Cleveland Browns ===
Hamilton was selected in the seventh round of the 2006 NFL draft with the 222nd overall pick by the Cleveland Browns and signed a four-year contract July 2006. During his rookie season, he appeared in ten games and recorded 15 tackles.

Prior to the 2007 season, Hamilton was waived with an injury settlement and spent the year out of football.

=== Washington Redskins ===
On May 30, 2008, Hamilton was signed by the Washington Redskins. He was released by the Redskins on June 12, but re-signed on August 7 when fullback Pete Schmitt was waived. Hamilton had a good preseason with a total of 11 tackles, one sack, and one forced fumble. He survived the final cut on August 30 and made the 53-man roster. On October 14, 2008, Hamilton was cut by the Washington Redskins.

== Coaching career ==
=== Virginia–Wise ===
Hamilton served as assistant coach and defensive coordinator at UVa-Wise. He began as the conditioning coach and 2011 was his first year as defensive coordinator for the Highland Cavaliers football team.

=== VMI ===
Hamilton was hired in 2014 to coach outside linebackers for the Keydets. In January 2015, new VMI head coach Scott Wachenheim announced he was retaining Hamilton on the coaching staff.

=== Virginia Tech ===
Hamilton joined Virginia Tech's staff as the Director of Player Personnel- Defense in 2018, and was promoted to safeties coach prior to the 2019 season. Following the retirement of defensive coordinator Bud Foster, Hamilton was promoted to that position Dec. 8, 2019.

=== Tennessee Titans ===
On February 7, 2023, Hamilton was hired as a defensive quality control coach for the Tennessee Titans.

=== Indianapolis Colts ===
On February 6, 2024, Hamilton was officially hired by the Indianapolis Colts to serve as their Assistant defensive backs coach.

=== New England Patriots ===
On February 5, 2025, Hamilton was hired by the New England Patriots to serve as their cornerbacks coach.
