= West Fork Furnace =

- U.S. National Register of Historic Places
- U.S. Historic district
- Virginia Landmarks Register
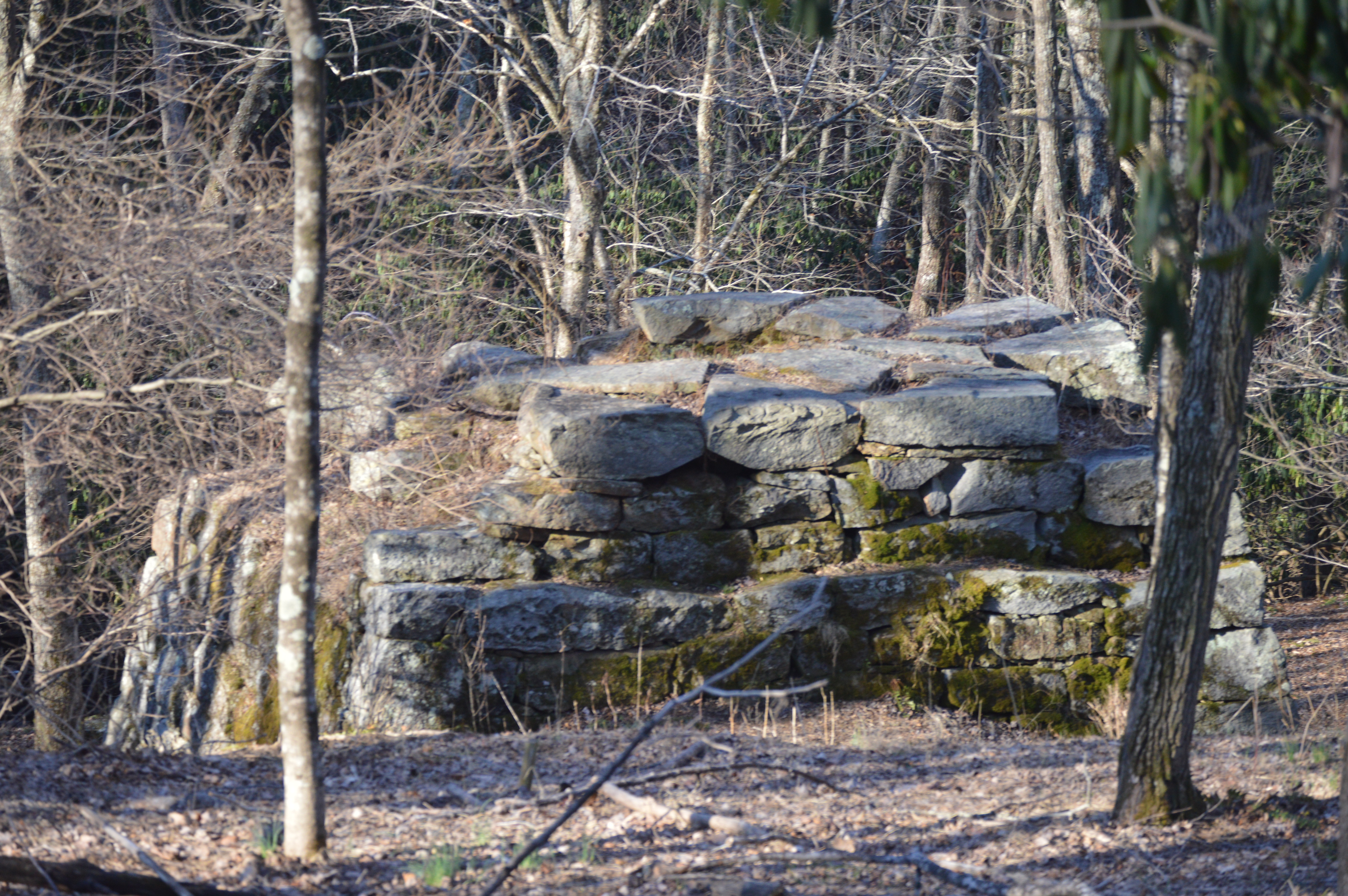
- Overview from the north

- Location within Virginia Location within the United States
- Location: VA 605, Floyd, Virginia
- Coordinates: 36°50′2″N 80°22′30″W
- Area: 2.6 acres (1.1 ha)
- Built: 1853
- NRHP reference No.: 09000414
- VLR No.: 031-0084

Significant dates
- Added to NRHP: June 5, 2009
- Designated VLR: March 19, 2009

West Fork Furnace is a historic iron furnace and national historic district located near Floyd, Floyd County, Virginia. The district includes structural, landscape and archaeological components of a small and well preserved mid-19th-century iron furnace built about 1853. The components consist of the furnace, retaining wall, staging area, head race, wheel pit, tail race, and East Prong of Furnace Creek. The furnace remained in operation until 1855.

It was listed on the National Register of Historic Places in 2009.
