= Western Virginia =

Geographic region of Virginia, United States

Coordinates: 37°40′N 79°10′W

Map of the United States District Courts in Virginia, showing the boundaries of the Eastern and Western Districts, and their divisions.

Western Virginia is a geographic region in Virginia comprising the Shenandoah Valley and Southwest Virginia. Generally, the Appalachian areas in Virginia located west of the Piedmont region are considered part of western Virginia, though sometimes bordering areas of the Piedmont are included as well.

The United States District Court for the Western District of Virginia covers most of the state's land area, and includes most cities and counties in central and southern Virginia. By this definition, nearly all places in the state located west of the coastal plain, would be considered western Virginia.

The Crooked Road celebrates the musical heritage of this region.
