= Glenanna =

Historic house in Virginia, United States

- U.S. National Register of Historic Places
- U.S. Historic district – Contributing property
- Virginia Landmarks Register
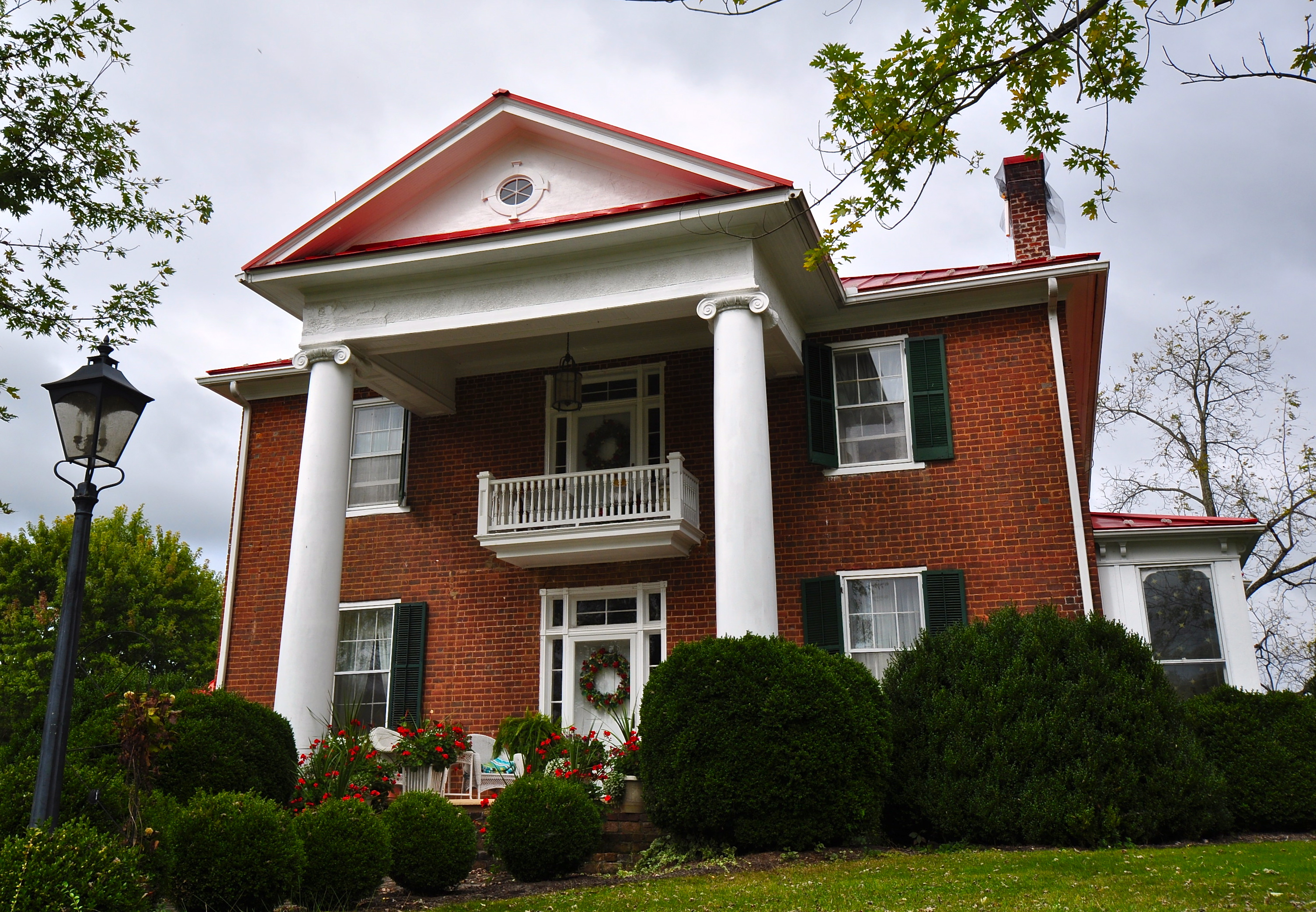
- Glenanna, October 2013

- Location within Virginia Location within the United States
- Location: 204 W. Main St., Floyd, Virginia
- Coordinates: 36°54′40.4″N 80°19′18.5″W
- Area: 2 acres (0.81 ha)
- Built: 1849
- Built by: Dillon, Henry
- Architectural style: Greek Revival
- Part of: Floyd Historic District (ID05001266)
- NRHP reference No.: 02000523
- VLR No.: 219-0018

Significant dates
- Added to NRHP: May 16, 2002
- Designated CP: November 16, 2005
- Designated VLR: June 13, 2001

Glenanna is a historic home located at Floyd, Floyd County, Virginia. It was built in 1849, and is a large two-story, double pile, brick dwelling in the Greek Revival style. The front facade features a massive, two-story, single-tier portico sheltering a small balcony on the second floor. The portico, a small conservatory, and a kitchen wing were added in the early-20th century. Also on the property are a contributing kitchen / servant house; a well shelter / dairy; and a smokehouse.

It was listed on the National Register of Historic Places in 2002. It is located in the Floyd Historic District.
