= Meadows of Dan, Virginia =

Unincorporated community in Virginia, United States

- Census-designated place
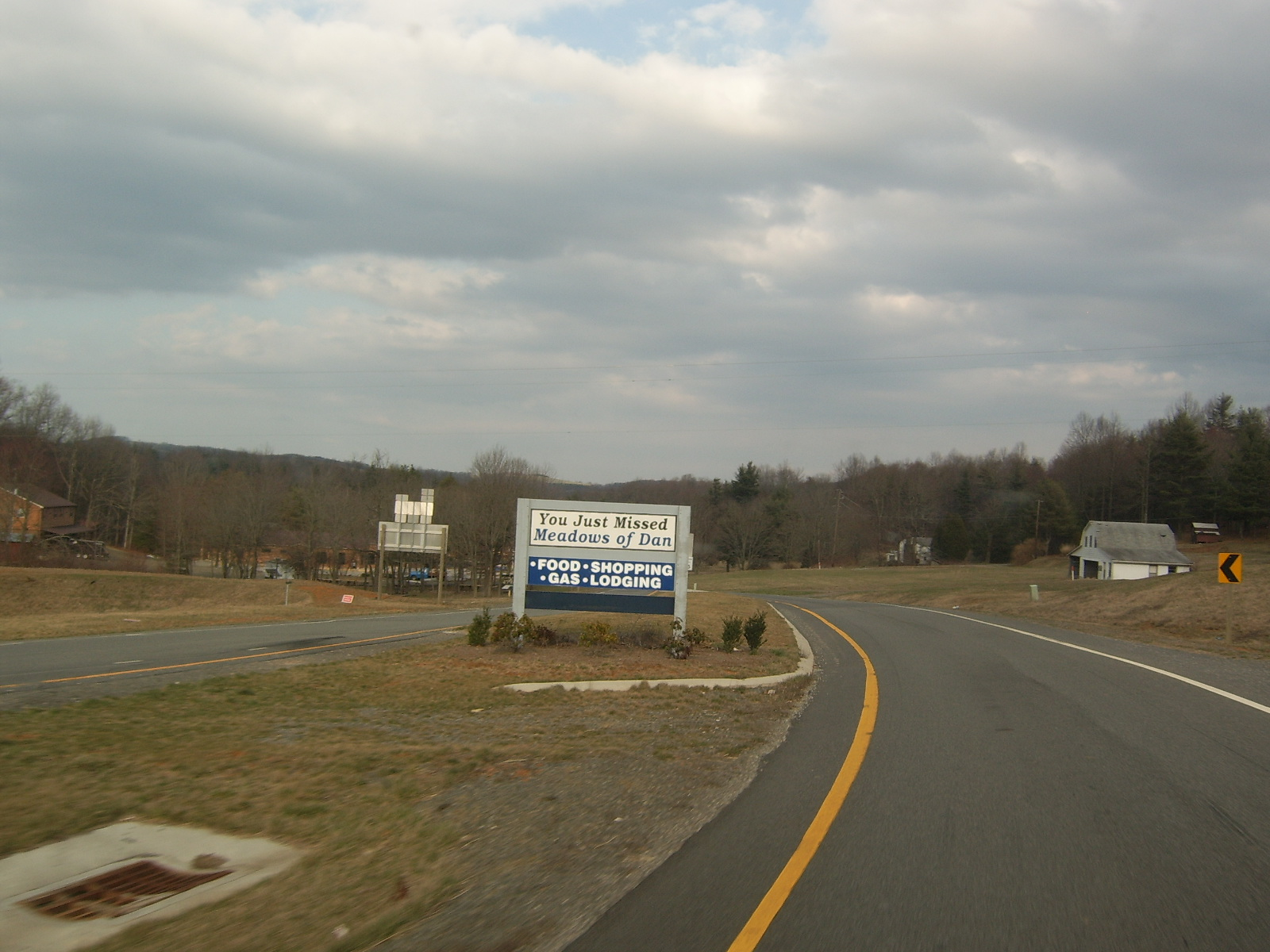
- US 58 just outside Meadows of Dan

- Location within the Commonwealth of Virginia Meadows of Dan, Virginia (the United States)
- Coordinates: 36°44′11″N 80°23′43″W
- Country: United States
- State: Virginia
- County: Patrick

Area
  - Total: 1.20 sq mi (3.10 km^{2})
- Elevation: 2,956 ft (901 m)

Population (2020)
  - Total: 72
  - Density: 60/sq mi (23/km^{2})
- Time zone: UTC−5 (Eastern (EST))
  - Summer (DST): UTC−4 (EDT)
- ZIP Codes: 24120
- GNIS feature ID: 2807434

Meadows of Dan is an unincorporated community and census-designated place in Patrick County, Virginia, United States, where the Blue Ridge Parkway (milepost 178) crosses U.S. Route 58 (Jeb Stuart Highway). It was first listed as a CDP in the 2020 census with a population of 72.

There are numerous country shops, older houses, and restaurants in the community. It is located near the Patrick/Floyd county line, approximately 20 miles east of Hillsville and about 14 miles northwest of Stuart. The community's name is credited to one of its earliest English settlers, James Steptoe Langhorne, and comes from the meadows that abound near the Dan River which flows through the area. The community's motto as posted on the welcoming sign is "A simpler place in time". Meadows of Dan is located along the Crooked Road, Virginia's heritage music trail, and in the Rocky Knob American Viticultural Area.

The community of Meadows of Dan hosts an annual Folk Fair, in cooperation with the Virginia Peach Festival. Meadows of Dan was also a setting for the ministry of Bob Childress, whose life was chronicled in the book The Man Who Moved a Mountain.

The Cockram Mill and Mayberry Presbyterian Church are listed on the National Register of Historic Places. Meadows of Dan is located approximately one half hour north of Andy Griffith's hometown of Mount Airy, North Carolina, the city which is widely believed to have inspired the fictitious Mayberry on the Andy Griffith Show. It has been speculated that the name "Mayberry" may have come from either Mayberry Road, The Mayberry Trading Post, or the Mayberry Presbyterian Church in Meadows of Dan.

== Demographics ==
Meadows of Dan first appeared as a census designated place in the 2020 United States census.

== Notable person ==
- Beatrice Farnham, artist and entrepreneur
