= Willis, Floyd County, Virginia =

Unincorporated community in Virginia, United States

- unincorporated community
- Location within Virginia Location within the United States
- Coordinates: 36°51′28″N 80°28′51″W
- Country: United States
- State: Virginia
- County: Floyd
- Time zone: UTC−5 (Eastern (EST))
  - Summer (DST): UTC−4 (EDT)
- ZIP codes: 24380

Willis is an unincorporated community in southwestern Floyd County, Virginia, United States. It lies along U.S. Route 221, southwest of the town of Floyd, the county seat of Floyd County. It has an elevation of 2,723 feet (830 m). Although Willis is unincorporated, it has a post office, with the ZIP code of 24380.

The Willis Presbyterian Church and Cemetery was listed on the National Register of Historic Places in 2007.
