= Floyd Presbyterian Church =

Historic church in Virginia, US

- U.S. National Register of Historic Places
- U.S. Historic district – Contributing property
- Virginia Landmarks Register
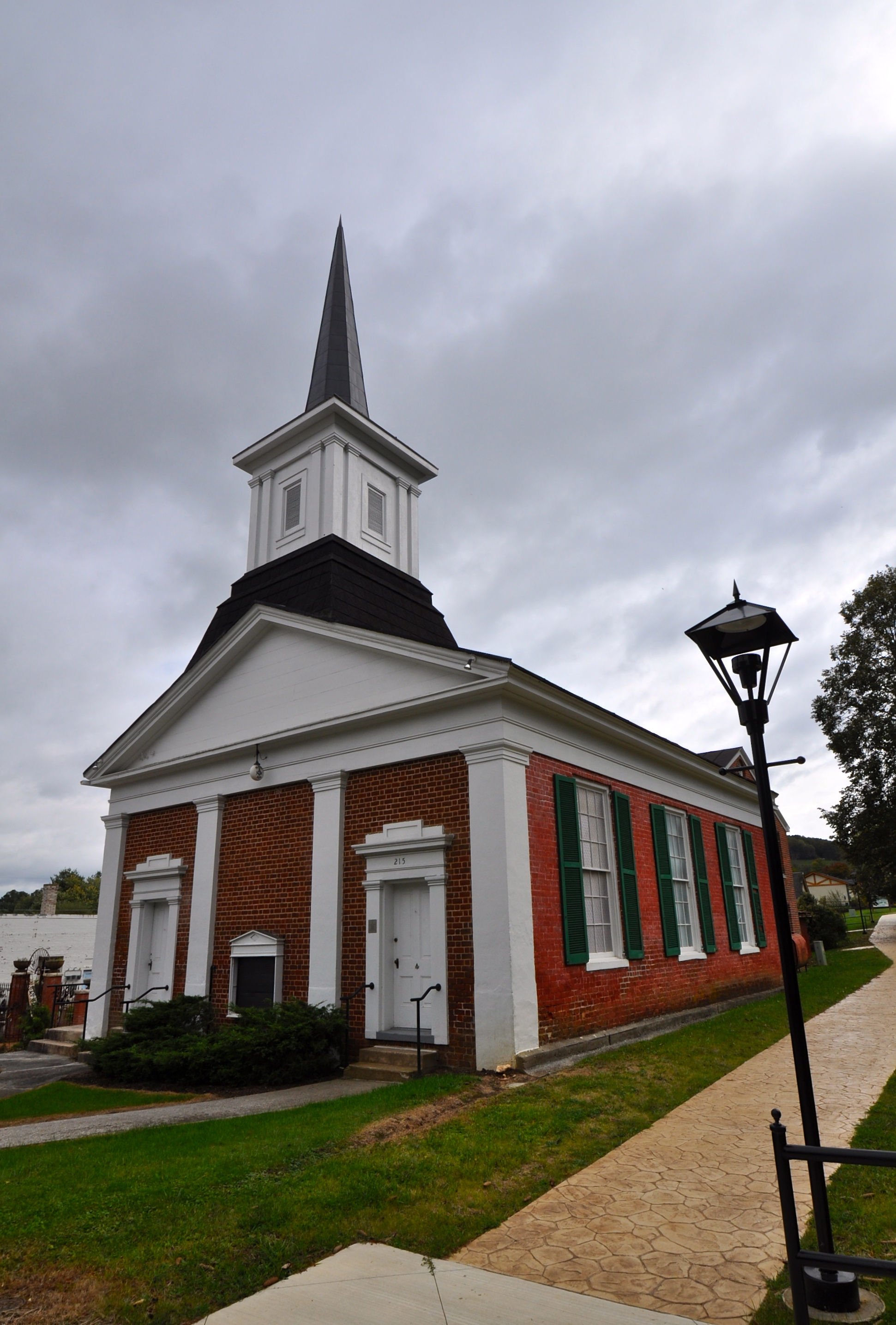
- Floyd Presbyterian Church, October 2013

- Location within Virginia Location within the United States
- Location: U.S. 221, Floyd, Virginia
- Coordinates: 36°54′40″N 80°19′6″W
- Area: less than one acre
- Built: 1850
- Architect: Dillon, Henry
- Architectural style: Greek Revival
- Part of: Floyd Historic District (ID05001266)
- NRHP reference No.: 76002105
- VLR No.: 219-0003

Significant dates
- Added to NRHP: May 17, 1976
- Designated CP: November 16, 2005
- Designated VLR: December 16, 1975

Floyd Presbyterian Church is a historic Presbyterian church located on U.S. 221 in Floyd, Floyd County, Virginia. It was built in 1850, and is a one-story, three-bay, brick church in the Greek Revival style. It has a front gable roof topped by a low steeple and octagonal spire. The front facade features four white-painted stuccoed, Greek Doric order pilasters. The church was abandoned by its congregation in October, 1974, and the congregation relocated.

It was listed on the National Register of Historic Places in 1976. It is located in the Floyd Historic District.
