= Phlegar Farm =

Historic house in Virginia, United States

- U.S. National Register of Historic Places
- Virginia Landmarks Register
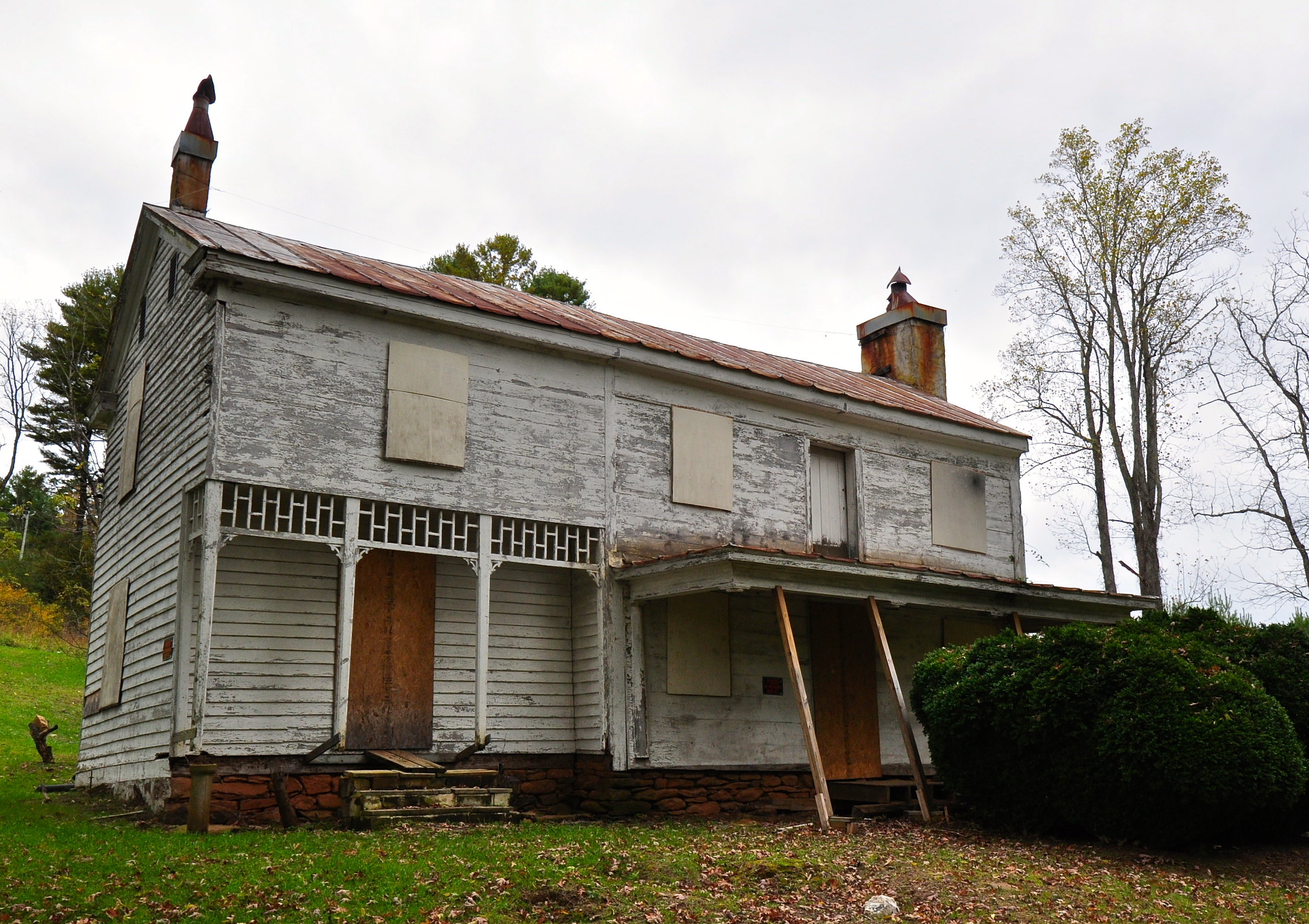
- Phlegar Farmhouse, October 2013

- Location within Virginia Location within the United States
- Location: Off State Route 615, near Floyd, Virginia
- Coordinates: 36°55′30″N 80°18′18″W
- Area: 2 acres (0.81 ha)
- Built: c. 1816, c. 1857, c. 1910
- Architectural style: Federal, Greek Revival
- NRHP reference No.: 03000565
- VLR No.: 031-0179

Significant dates
- Added to NRHP: June 22, 2003
- Designated VLR: June 23, 2003

Phlegar Farm is a historic home located near Floyd, Floyd County, Virginia. The original log dwelling was built in 1816, and later expanded about 1857 and about 1910. The house is two-stories with a metal sheathed gable roof, weatherboard siding, a stone gable-end chimney, two one-story front porches, and a one-story ell. The interior has Federal and Greek Revival style details. Also on the property are a contributing granary and workshop.

It was listed on the National Register of Historic Places in 2003.
