= Haysi High School =

Location
- Drawer G/#1 Tiger Circle; Haysi, Virginia 24256; United States
- Coordinates: 37°11′58″N 82°17′35″W

Information
- School type: Public high school
- Closed: 2015
- School district: Dickenson County School Division
- Superintendent: Ms. Haydee Robinson
- Principal: Mr. John Whitner
- Grades: 8–12
- Enrollment: 264 (2012)
- Language: English
- Colors: Red, White, and Blue
- Mascot: Tigers
- Rival: Clintwood High School Honaker High School
- Athletic Conference: Black Diamond District; Region D
- Website: Official Site

Haysi High School was a public high school located in Haysi, Virginia, in Dickenson County, Virginia. It is part of the Dickenson County School Division. Athletic teams compete in the Virginia High School League's A Black Diamond District in Region D. In 2015, it closed and its student body consolidated with nearby Clintwood High School to form Ridgeview High.

== Extracurricular activities ==
=== Basketball ===
Haysi won the state championship for boys basketball in 1962. The boys team was awarded the Marshall Johnson Sportsmanship Award for the 1997-1998 season. The Haysi girls team held the Virginia State Record for most consecutive wins with 78 from 1947 to 1951,

=== Football ===
Haysi won 19 Black Diamond District titles and claimed 3 Region D Titles, and 5 total State Semifinals appearances. The Tigers football teams was led by James Colley, who returned to his alma mater in 1979 and took over as Head Coach in 1982. As Head Coach he won 254 games, led the Tigers to the playoffs in 22 seasons and is known throughout Southwest Virginia as an offensive mastermind, utilizing multiple formations. This offensive style has resulted in several former Haysi players being included in the VHSL record book; Jason Compton(87 Career Passing TDs), Terry Gulley (7 Passing TDs in a single game), Jamie Hackney (completions in state playoffs), Kory Bostic (38 Career Receiving TDs), Dakota Stanley(17 Receptions in a single game, 304 receiving yards in a single game, (165 Career Receptions) and Allen Owens (174 Career Extra Points). While the Haysi Football team enjoyed considerable success that was not always the case, between 1964 and 1969 the Football team lost 43 consecutive games.

BDD Titles '79, '80, '84, '85, '87, '90, '91, '93-'98, '01, '04, '06, '09, '13

State Semifinals appearances '91, '93, '05, '13, '14

=== Creative Writing ===
Haysi won the 1989, 1995, 1996, 1997, 1999, and 2004 championship for creative writing.
