= Clintwood, Virginia =

- Town
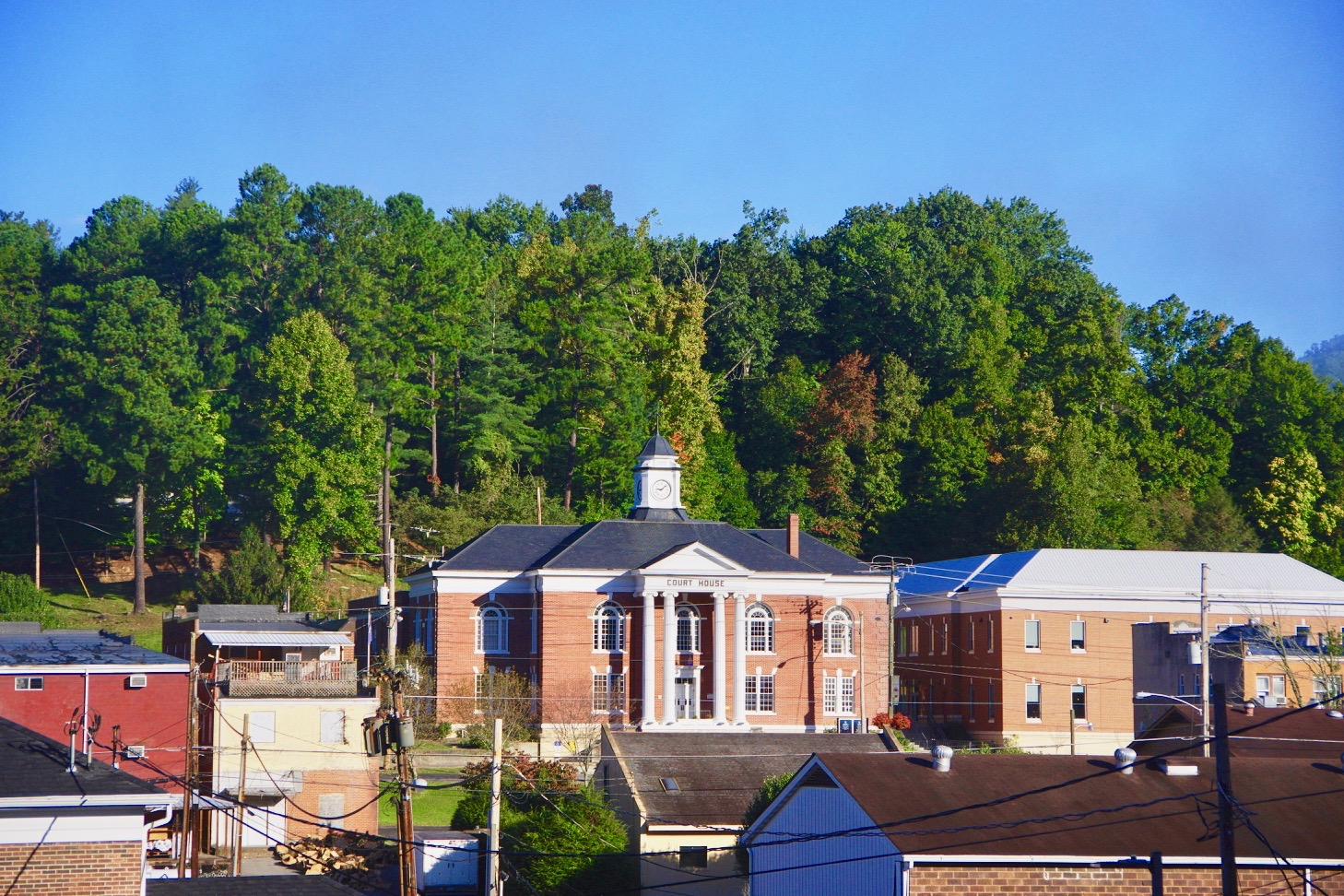
- Clintwood

- Seal
- Motto: "The county seat of Virginia's baby"
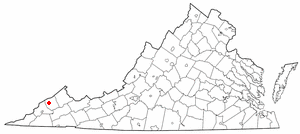
- Location of Clintwood, Virginia
- Coordinates: 37°9′0″N 82°27′24″W
- Country: United States
- State: Virginia
- County: Dickenson
- Founded by: John Wesley Mullins Jr

Government
  - Mayor: Danny Lambert
  - Sheriff: Jeremy Fleming

Area
  - Total: 2.08 sq mi (5.39 km^{2})
  - Land: 2.08 sq mi (5.39 km^{2})
  - Water: 0.0039 sq mi (0.01 km^{2})
- Elevation: 1,755 ft (535 m)

Population (2020)
  - Total: 1,377
  - Estimate (2019): 1,284
  - Density: 617.4/sq mi (238.37/km^{2})
- Time zone: UTC−5 (Eastern (EST))
  - Summer (DST): UTC−4 (EDT)
- ZIP code: 24228
- Area code: 276
- FIPS code: 51-17552
- GNIS feature ID: 1498468
- Website: www.townofclintwood.com

Clintwood is a town in Dickenson County, Virginia, United States. The population was 1,377 at the 2020 census. It is the county seat of Dickenson County.

Although originally called "Holly Creek" after a small stream that runs through the town, it was later named "Clintwood" after Major Henry Clinton Wood, a Confederate officer in the 37th Virginia Infantry Regiment.

== History ==
Clintwood, Virginia was founded in 1829 by John "Holly Creek John" Mullins. In June 1948, the town of Clintwood elected an all-female town council for the period from 1948 to 1950. The "Petticoat Government", as it was nicknamed, implemented change in many areas, including cleanup of the town, eliminating parking problems, organizing a systematic garbage disposal system, eliminating several traffic hazards, organizing the town's fire department, and purchasing a fire truck. The "Petticoat Government" received the attention of Lady Astor, a Virginia-born member of the British Parliament who expressed a desire to visit Clintwood to see how the experiment was going. The town was also featured in broadcasts by the Voice of America.

== Geography ==
Clintwood is located in northwestern Dickenson County at 37°9′0″N 82°27′24″W (37.150054, −82.456698). Virginia State Route 83 passes through the town, leading east 11 miles (18 km) to Clinchco and west 9 miles (14 km) to Pound.

According to the United States Census Bureau, Clintwood has a total area of 1.9 square miles (4.9 km^{2}), all land.

=== Climate ===
Owing to its altitude, Clintwood has an oceanic climate (Köppen climate classification Cfb).

Climate data for Clintwood, Virginia (1991–2020 normals, extremes 1993–present)
Month	Jan	Feb	Mar	Apr	May	Jun	Jul	Aug	Sep	Oct	Nov	Dec	Year
Record high °F (°C)	76 (24)	78 (26)	85 (29)	90 (32)	92 (33)	97 (36)	97 (36)	95 (35)	94 (34)	89 (32)	82 (28)	73 (23)	97 (36)
Mean daily maximum °F (°C)	42.5 (5.8)	46.5 (8.1)	55.9 (13.3)	67.5 (19.7)	74.1 (23.4)	79.5 (26.4)	81.8 (27.7)	80.7 (27.1)	75.9 (24.4)	66.4 (19.1)	55.4 (13.0)	45.5 (7.5)	64.3 (17.9)
Daily mean °F (°C)	32.1 (0.1)	35.3 (1.8)	42.7 (5.9)	52.5 (11.4)	60.9 (16.1)	67.7 (19.8)	71.2 (21.8)	70.3 (21.3)	64.3 (17.9)	53.1 (11.7)	42.6 (5.9)	35.4 (1.9)	52.3 (11.3)
Mean daily minimum °F (°C)	21.7 (−5.7)	24.1 (−4.4)	29.4 (−1.4)	37.6 (3.1)	47.8 (8.8)	55.9 (13.3)	60.7 (15.9)	59.9 (15.5)	52.8 (11.6)	39.9 (4.4)	29.7 (−1.3)	25.3 (−3.7)	40.4 (4.7)
Record low °F (°C)	−19 (−28)	−23 (−31)	0 (−18)	18 (−8)	28 (−2)	36 (2)	45 (7)	41 (5)	31 (−1)	20 (−7)	8 (−13)	−4 (−20)	−23 (−31)
Average precipitation inches (mm)	3.72 (94)	3.91 (99)	4.42 (112)	4.56 (116)	4.94 (125)	5.12 (130)	5.31 (135)	4.06 (103)	3.25 (83)	2.83 (72)	2.80 (71)	4.25 (108)	49.17 (1,249)
Average snowfall inches (cm)	11.5 (29)	10.5 (27)	6.6 (17)	0.8 (2.0)	0.0 (0.0)	0.0 (0.0)	0.0 (0.0)	0.0 (0.0)	0.0 (0.0)	0.3 (0.76)	1.1 (2.8)	7.6 (19)	38.4 (98)
Average precipitation days (≥ 0.01 in)	15.5	14.8	14.8	13.5	14.9	14.3	14.2	12.0	9.6	10.5	11.8	14.9	160.8
Average snowy days (≥ 0.1 in)	7.7	6.7	4.2	0.9	0.0	0.0	0.0	0.0	0.0	0.2	1.7	5.4	26.8
Source: NOAA

== Demographics ==
Historical population
Census	Pop.	Note	%±
1900	255		—
1910	342		34.1%
1920	400		17.0%
1930	729		82.3%
1940	1,106		51.7%
1950	1,366		23.5%
1960	1,400		2.5%
1970	1,320		−5.7%
1980	1,369		3.7%
1990	1,542		12.6%
2000	1,549		0.5%
2010	1,414		−8.7%
2020	1,377		−2.6%
2025 (est.)	1,297	▼	−5.8%
U.S. Decennial Census

As of the census of 2000, there were 1,549 people, 672 households, and 426 families residing in the town. The population density was 812.0 people per square mile (313.5 people/km^{2}). There were 756 housing units at an average density of 396.3 per square mile (153.0/km^{2}). The racial makeup of the town was 98.52% White, 0.19% African American, 0.19% Native American, 0.13% Asian, and 0.97% from two or more races. Hispanic or Latino of any race were 0.52% of the population.

There were 672 households, out of which 21.9% had children under the age of 18 living with them, 44.8% were married couples living together, 15.5% had a female householder with no husband present, and 36.5% were non-families. 33.8% of all households were made up of individuals, and 17.7% had someone living alone who was 65 years of age or older. The average household size was 2.10 and the average family size was 2.65.

In the town, the population was spread out, with 16.5% under the age of 18, 8.3% from 18 to 24, 23.2% from 25 to 44, 27.8% from 45 to 64, and 24.3% who were 65 years of age or older. The median age was 46 years. For every 100 females, there were 84.4 males. For every 100 females age 18 and over, there were 81.5 males.

The median income for a household in the town was $22,663, and the median income for a family was $30,833. Males had a median income of $29,844 versus $21,250 for females. The per capita income for the town was $16,323. About 16.0% of families and 21.6% of the population were below the poverty line, including 30.5% of those under age 18 and 16.7% of those age 65 or over.

== Education ==
- Ridgeview High School (Grades 9 – 12)
- Ridgeview Middle School (Grades 6 – 8)
- Dickenson Center for Education and Research
- Dickenson County Career Center

== Industry ==
- Range Resources
- Dickenson Research and Education Center (many businesses also have offices here)
- Appalachian Power
- Marty Materials

== Recreation ==
- Bear Pen Recreation Area (includes pool, park, picnic shelters, walking track, field for activities, and Pound River)
- Cranes Nest River and Recreation/Camping Area (includes fishing spots, multiple playgrounds, campground with RV sites, and walking/biking/horseback riding trails)

== Area attractions ==
- Breaks Interstate Park
- John W. Flanagan Dam and Reservoir
- Ralph Stanley Museum
- Birch Knob Tower
- Jettie Baker Center
- Dickenson County Historical Society
- Cranes Nest River and camping/recreation area
- Jefferson National Forest
- Dickenson County Courthouse
- Dickenson County Art Center & Gallery
- Mountain Music Festival
- Dickenson County Visitor Center & Dr. Phipps Museum
- Phipps Family Memorial Park

== Notable people ==
Singer, songwriter and multi-instrumentalist Mark Linkous (Sparklehorse) has family ties to Clintwood, and for a short time called Clintwood home.

Justin Hamilton was a former star at Clintwood High School, defensive back for the Virginia Tech Hokies and former member of the National Football League's Cleveland Browns and Washington Redskins football organizations.

Bluegrass musician Ralph Stanley was from Dickenson County and lived on Sandy Ridge in the mountains that surround Clintwood. A museum honoring his musical legacy is located in the historic district of downtown.
