= Floyd Historic District (Floyd County, Virginia) =

Historic district in Virginia, United States

- U.S. National Register of Historic Places
- U.S. Historic district
- Virginia Landmarks Register
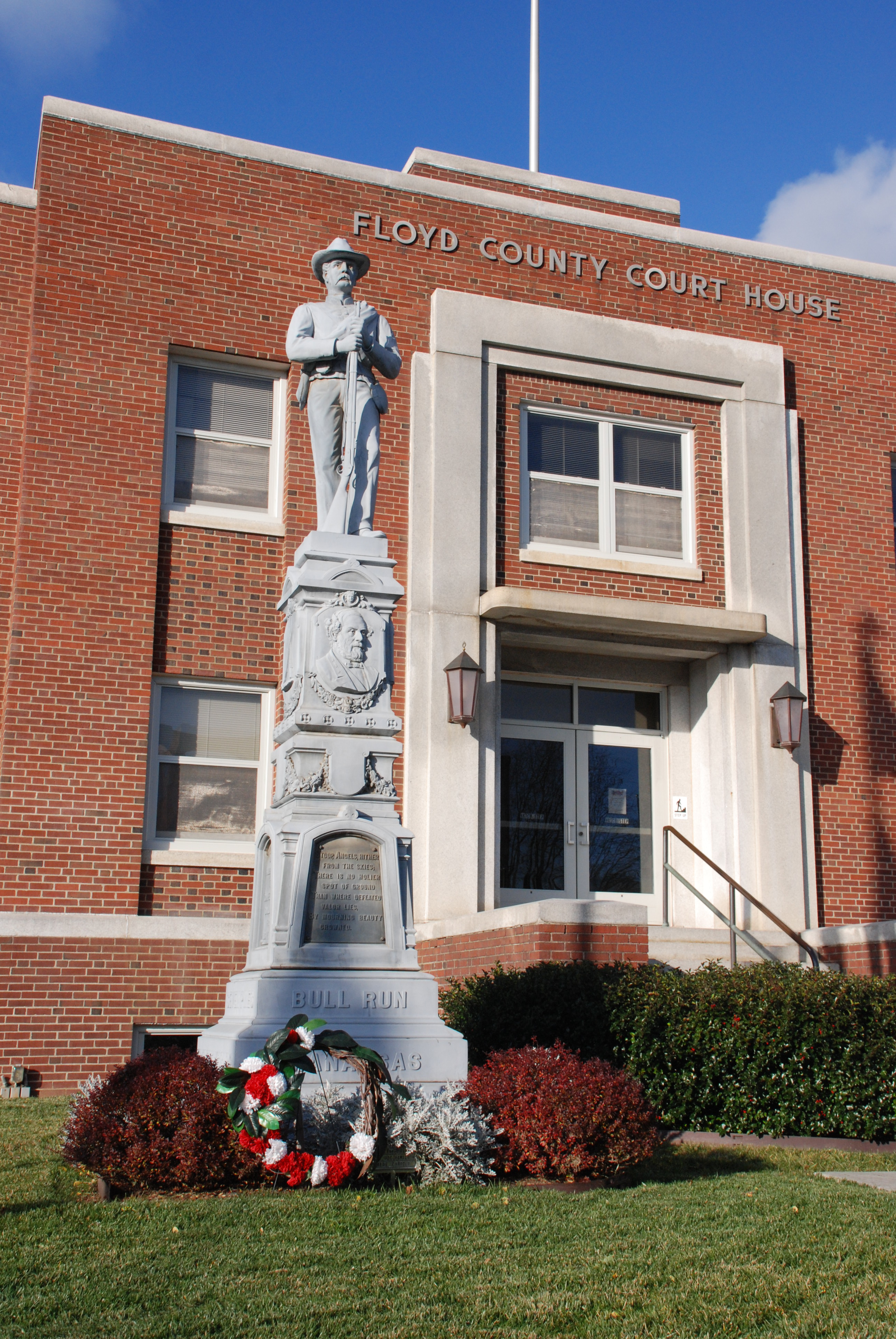
- Confederate monument in front of Floyd County courthouse

- Location within Virginia Location within the United States
- Location: Floyd, Virginia: centered along Main and Osford Sts. bet. Penn Ave., and Baker St. and Sweeney and Nira St.
- Coordinates: 36°54′43″N 80°19′10″W
- NRHP reference No.: 05001266
- VLR No.: 219-0015

Significant dates
- Added to NRHP: November 16, 2005
- Designated VLR: September 14, 2005

Floyd Historic District is a national historic district located at Floyd, Floyd County, Virginia. It encompasses 164 contributing buildings, 1 contributing site, and 1 contributing object (Confederate Memorial, 1904) in the central business district and surrounding residential areas in the county seat of Floyd. They include residential commercial, institutional, and governmental buildings largely built between 1832 and 1955. Notable buildings include the Phlegar House (1816), Ferdinand A. Winston House (c. 1845), Henry Dillon House (1851), Floyd High School (1913), Horatio Howard Building (1897), Freezer Shirt Factory (1936), and Floyd County Courthouse (1951-1952). The district includes the separately listed Floyd Presbyterian Church and Glenanna.

It was listed on the National Register of Historic Places in 2005.

== Gallery ==
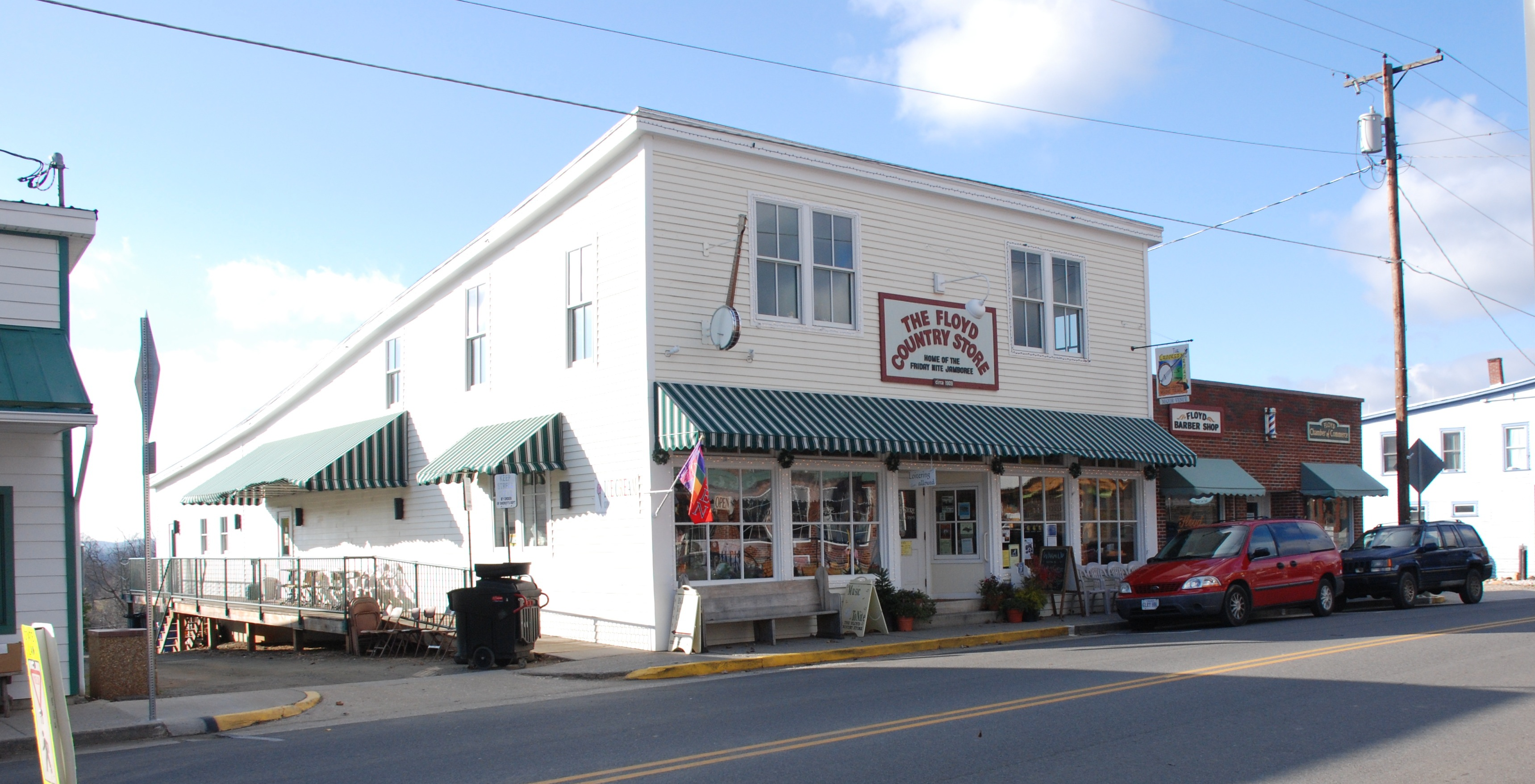
Country Store, home of famous "Friday Night Jamboree" of bluegrass music.

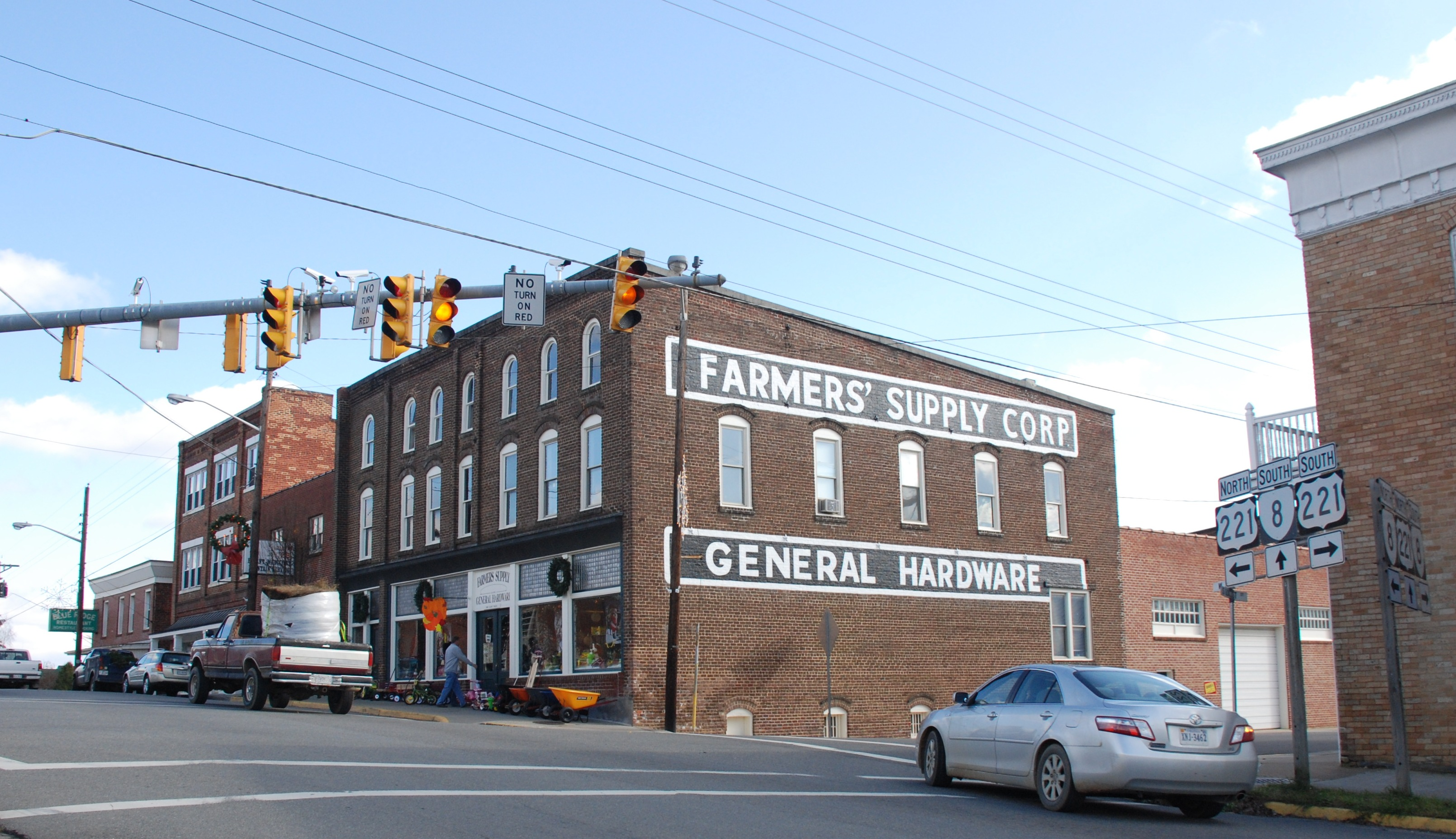
Hardware store
