= Clintwood High School =

Location
- 141 Greenwave Circle; Clintwood, Virginia 24228; United States
- 37°8′54″N 82°27′35″W

Information
- School type: Public, high school
- Founded: 1918
- Closed: 2015
- School district: Dickenson County Schools
- Superintendent: Haydee Robinson
- Principal: Rodney Compton
- Grades: 9-12
- Enrollment: 320 (2012)
- Language: English
- Colors: Green, white, and gold
- Athletics conference: A Cumberland District; Region D
- Mascot: Greenwave
- Rival: Haysi High School
- Newspaper: The Rolling Wave Newsletter
- Website: CHS Official Website

Clintwood High School was one of three high schools in Dickenson County, Virginia, United States. It was located in Clintwood, the county seat of Dickenson County. It combined with Haysi High School in the 2015–2016 school year to form Ridgeview High School.

== Athletics ==
=== Football ===
Clintwood won four state championships in football, three under legendary former head coach Ralph Cummins (1974, 1975, 1978) and one under Rick Mullins (2011). Clintwood played at Ralph Cummins Stadium. Coach Cummins was the head coach of the Clintwood Football team for 35 years; his teams won 271 games, going undefeated in the regular season 10 times. Coach Cummins is a member of the VHSL Hall of Fame.

=== Basketball ===
The Clintwood Boys basketball team won two state championships, in 1950 and 1951. The Clintwood Girls basketball team won three state championships, 1985, 1989, and 2015.

== Notable alumni ==
- Justin Hamilton - Former professional football player, NFL, Cleveland Browns and Washington Redskins
- Shane Hensley - Novelist and CEO of Pinnacle Entertainment Group
- Kevin Triplett - Vice President of Public Affairs for Bristol Motor Speedway; former candidate for US Congressman from Virginia's 9th Congressional District
- Loston Wallace - Comic book illustrator
- Patrick Fleming - Musician, Assistant Director of Quality for Fortune 500 industrial contractor, Certified Welding Inspector
- Danny Lambert - Mayor of Clintwood
