= Oakdale (Floyd, Virginia) =

Historic house in Virginia, United States

- U.S. National Register of Historic Places
- Virginia Landmarks Register
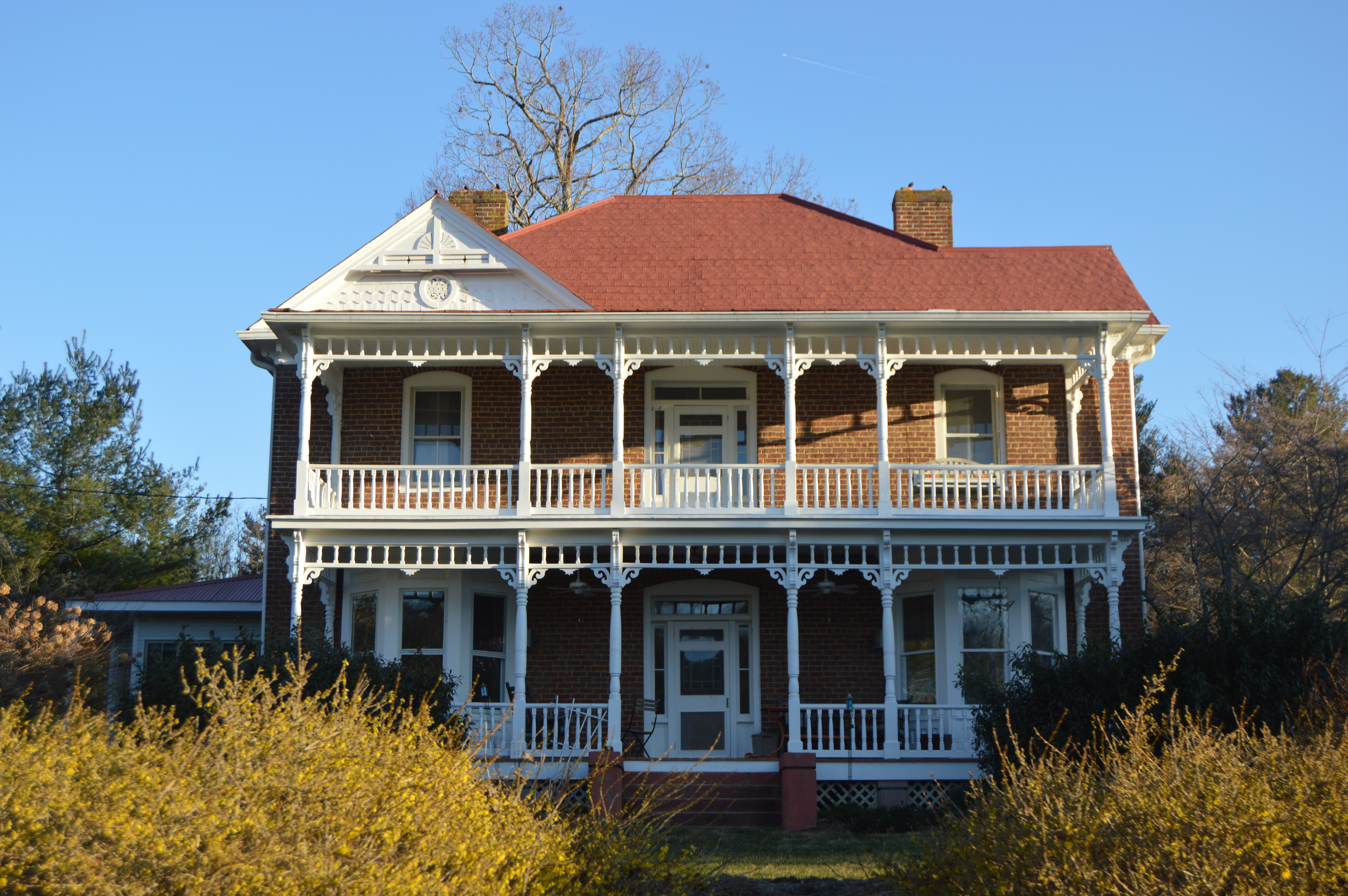
- Front of the farmhouse

- Location within Virginia Location within the United States
- Location: 5773 Franklin Pike, near Floyd, Virginia
- Coordinates: 36°58′16″N 80°08′31″W
- Area: 80 acres (32 ha)
- Built: c. 1890
- Architectural style: Queen Anne
- NRHP reference No.: 10000090
- VLR No.: 031-0025

Significant dates
- Added to NRHP: March 17, 2010
- Designated VLR: December 17, 2009

Oakdale is a historic home and farm located near the town of Floyd in Floyd County, Virginia, United States. The house was built about 1890, and is a large two-story, three-bay, frame dwelling in the Queen Anne style. It has a complex hipped roof and features a double-tier heavily ornamented front porch with turned posts, a spindle frieze, and sawn brackets. Also, on the property are a contributing large center-aisle barn (c. 1890), a two-story brick general store building (c. 1890), and a granary (c. 1915) and garage (c. 1935).

It was listed on the National Register of Historic Places in 2010.
