= Heartwood – The Southwest Virginia Artisan Gateway =

Venue in Abingdon, Virginia, US

Coordinates: 36.697107°N 82.003921°W

The Southwest Virginia Cultural Center and Marketplace (formerly Heartwood) is a visitor center, music venue, artisan marketplace, and community space located in Southwest Virginia in Abingdon, Virginia and is the gateway to regional craft, music, food outdoors, and local culture.

The Southwest Virginia Cultural Center and Marketplace is the largest effort to market Southwest Virginia as a single, unified destination to benefit the economy of the entire region. The building and its combined initiatives will contribute to a sustainable economy by highlighting the unique natural assets of the region with the purpose of attracting tourism and high-end creative economy businesses. The facility serves as the cultural and entrepreneurial introduction to the counties of Bland, Buchanan, Carroll, Dickenson, Floyd, Franklin, Giles, Grayson, Lee, Montgomery, Patrick, Pulaski, Russell, Scott, Smyth, Tazewell, Washington, Wise, and Wythe, and the cities of Bristol, Galax, Norton, and Radford.

Opened in 2011, the SWVA Cultural Center was inspired by the spirit and character of Southwest Virginia. Elements of agricultural buildings and structures, native to the settlers of the area, served as the inspiration for a distinctive and dynamic building. Designed by Spectrum Design of Roanoke and built by MB Contractors, Inc., the 29,000-square-foot (2,700 m^{2}) building sits on eight acres alongside Interstate 81. The LEED Registered building features artisan galleries, a cafe with locally supplied organic / farm-to-table fare, video portraits of musicians, craftspeople, and places to visit. Multiple maps of the region highlight destinations for visitors. The center showcases exhibits and demonstrations by local artisans and serves as a major venue on the Crooked Road Music Heritage Trail, complete with professionally produced musical performances. The building houses the offices of the Friends of Southwest Virginia, the Cultural Heritage Foundation, 'Round the Mountain: Southwest Virginia's Artisan Network and The Crooked Road, Virginia's Heritage Music Trail.

The facility was constructed and has been operated by three joint entities: Friends of Southwest Virginia, a 501c3 community development non-profit; the Southwest Virginia Cultural Heritage Foundation; and ‘Round the Mountain, Southwest Virginia's 501c3 non-profit artisan network. Funding partners included the Tobacco Indemnification and Community Revitalization Commission and Appalachian Regional Commission. Partners include the Virginia Department of Housing and Community Development, Virginia Tourism Corporation and the Virginia Department of Conservation and Resources. The Southwest Virginia Cultural Heritage Commission, established in 2008 by the Virginia General Assembly and transitioned to the Southwest Virginia Cultural Heritage Foundation in 2011, works as the lead in developing and coordinating the creative economy in Southwest Virginia. Through a supporting non-profit, the Friends of Southwest Virginia, businesses and individuals help artists, craftspeople, localities, nonprofits and entrepreneurs mobilize and succeed.

The creative economy movement is defined by innovative business development techniques. From the arts and music of the region to cultural goods and services capitalized through tourism to research and development, the joint work of the Foundation and the non-profit is revolutionizing the rural economic development system of Southwest Virginia and providing new jobs for the region.

A multifaceted plan identifies the cultural and natural assets of the region; coordinates initiatives, organizations and venues engaged in cultural and natural heritage toward more efficient operations for all partner organizations; and develops a comprehensive strategy and capital improvements plan to maximize the impact of state investments in this significant restructuring effort.

Key initiatives include:

- Branding and marketing Southwest Virginia to the world as a distinct culture and destination
- Developing and sustaining the Southwest Virginia Cultural Center and Marketplace (formerly Heartwood)
- Expanding outdoor recreation development initiatives and marketing throughout the region
- Planning and implementing downtown revitalization throughout the region to instill a high quality of life within our communities and promoting them to the world for a broad spectrum of economic development opportunities

The Friends of Southwest Virginia is supported through a regional partnership program of the 19 counties, four cities and 54 towns of Southwest Virginia; while funding from the many communities varies, support across the region for a single front in economic redevelopment is unified. Partners include the Virginia Department of Housing and Community Development, Virginia Tourism Corporation and the Virginia Department of Conservation and Recreation. Funding partners include the Commonwealth of Virginia, Virginia Tobacco Region Revitalization Commission, Appalachian Regional Commission, U.S. Economic Development Administration, several private foundations, and the communities of Southwest Virginia through the SWVA Partnership Program.
