= Mayberry Presbyterian Church =

- U.S. National Register of Historic Places
- Virginia Landmarks Register
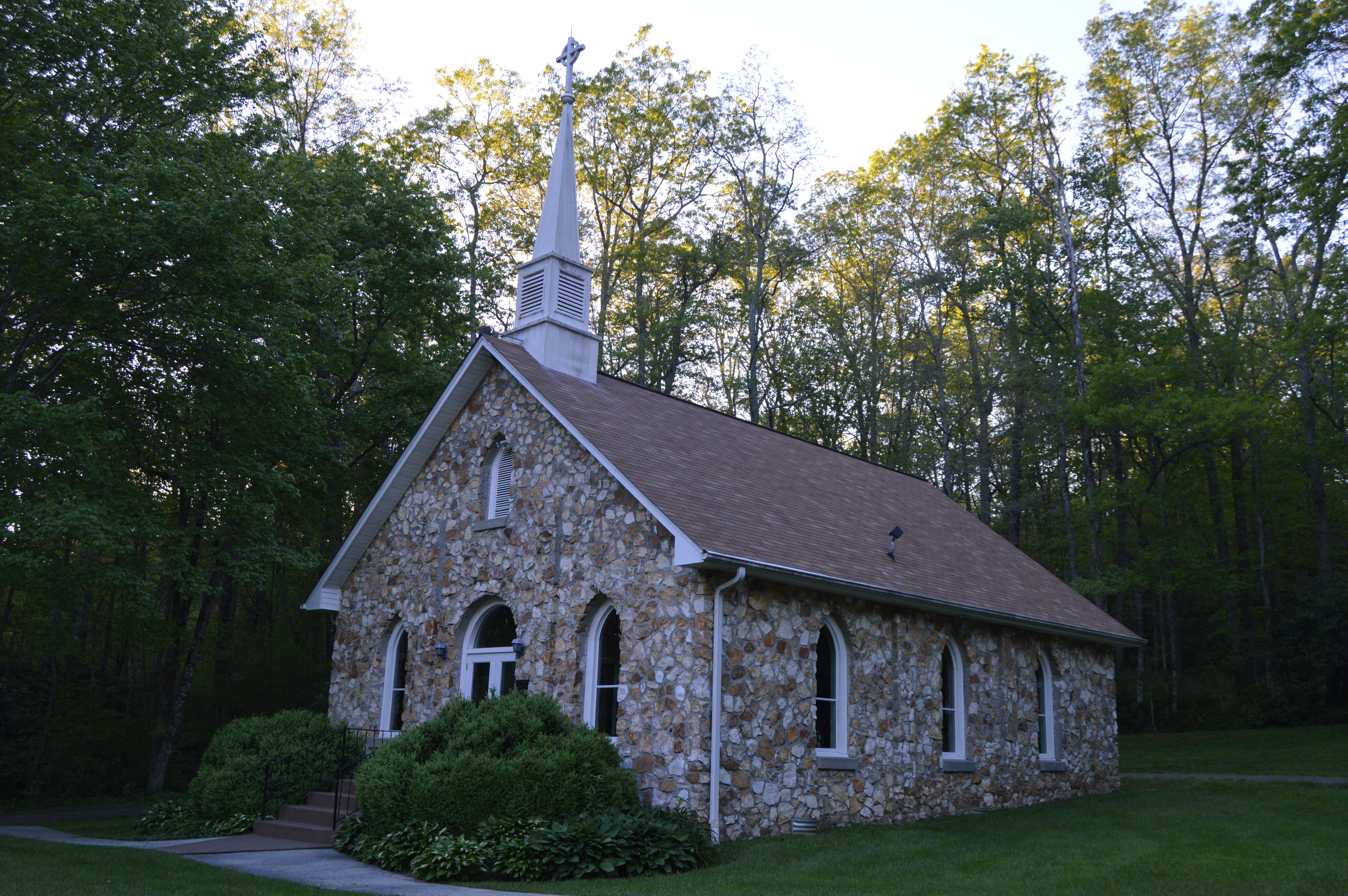
- Front and eastern side

- Location within Virginia Location within the United States
- Location: 1127 Mayberry Church Rd., Meadows of Dan, Virginia
- Coordinates: 36°42′44″N 80°26′20″W
- Area: Less than 1 acre (0.40 ha)
- Built: 1925
- Architectural style: Gothic Revival
- MPS: Reverend Robert Childress Presbyterian Churches MPS
- NRHP reference No.: 07000225
- VLR No.: 070-5045

Significant dates
- Added to NRHP: March 30, 2007
- Designated VLR: December 6, 2006

Mayberry Presbyterian Church is a historic Presbyterian church at 1127 Mayberry Church Road in Meadows of Dan, Patrick County, Virginia. It is one of the "rock churches" founded by Bob Childress. It was built in 1925, and is a one-story frame church building faced in natural quartz and quartzite stone. It features Gothic styled lancet windows. The rock facing was added to the frame building in 1948.

It was listed on the National Register of Historic Places in 2007.
