= Floyd, Virginia =

- Town
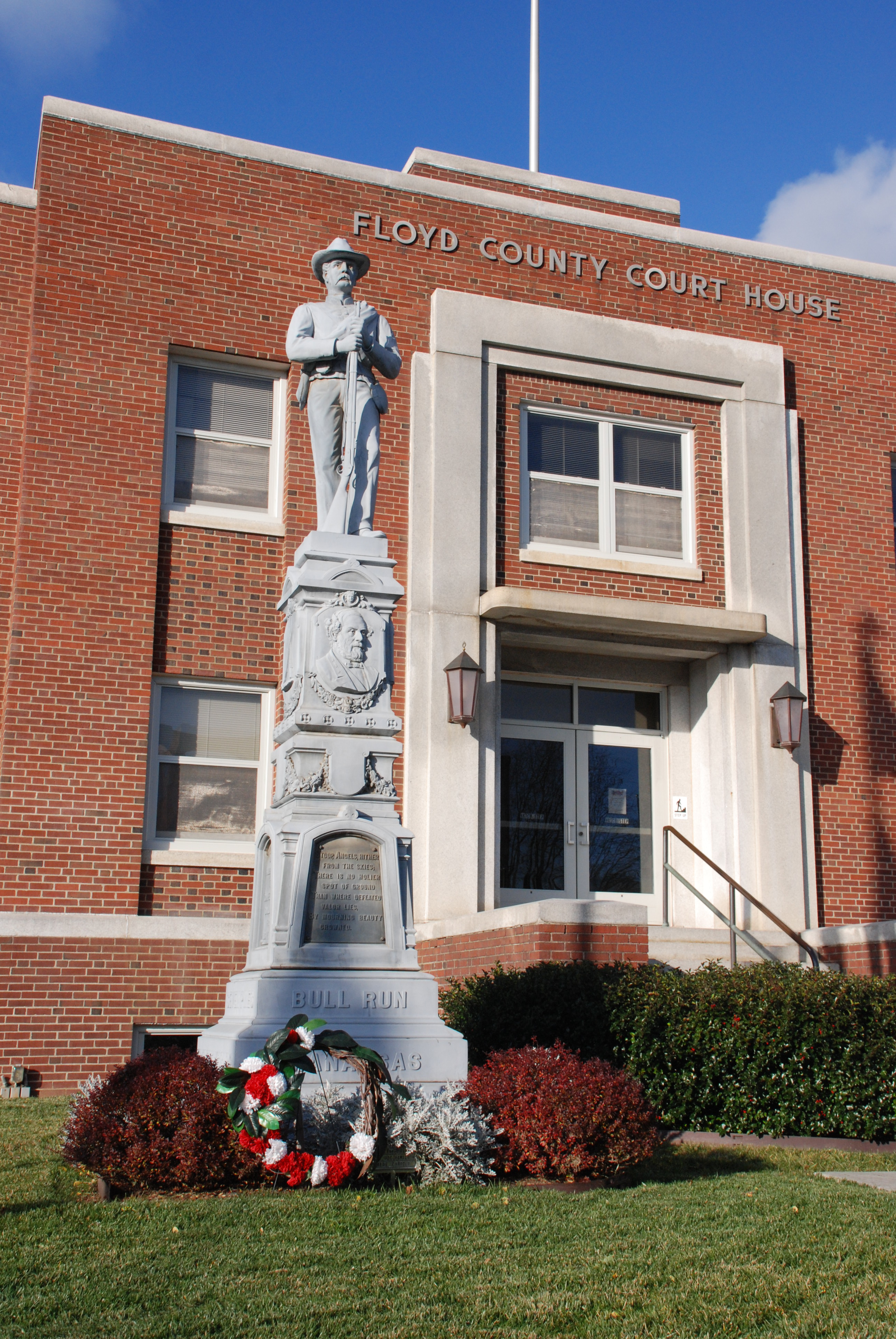
- Floyd County Courthouse and Confederate statue

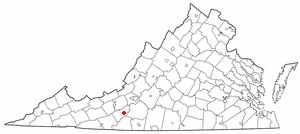
- Location of Floyd, Virginia

- Location of Floyd, Virginia Floyd, Virginia (the United States)
- Coordinates: 36°54′40″N 80°19′12″W
- Country: United States
- State: Virginia
- County: Floyd

Government
  - Type: Township
  - Mayor: William Griffin
  - Vice Mayor: Bruce Turner

Area
  - Total: 0.46 sq mi (1.18 km^{2})
  - Land: 0.46 sq mi (1.18 km^{2})
  - Water: 0 sq mi (0.00 km^{2})
- Elevation: 2,493 ft (760 m)

Population (2020)
  - Total: 448
- Time zone: UTC−5 (Eastern (EST))
  - Summer (DST): UTC−4 (EDT)
- ZIP code: 24091
- Area code: 540
- FIPS code: 51-28544
- GNIS feature ID: 1498479
- Website: www.floydcova.gov

Floyd is a town in Floyd County, Virginia, United States. The population was 448 at the 2020 census. It is the county seat of Floyd County. The Town of Floyd was originally named Jacksonville as the surrounding county was formed during the tenure of President Andrew Jackson. The name was subsequently changed to Floyd for Virginia governor John Floyd.

== History ==
The Floyd Historic District, Floyd Presbyterian Church, Glenanna, Phlegar Farm, and Oakdale are listed on the National Register of Historic Places.

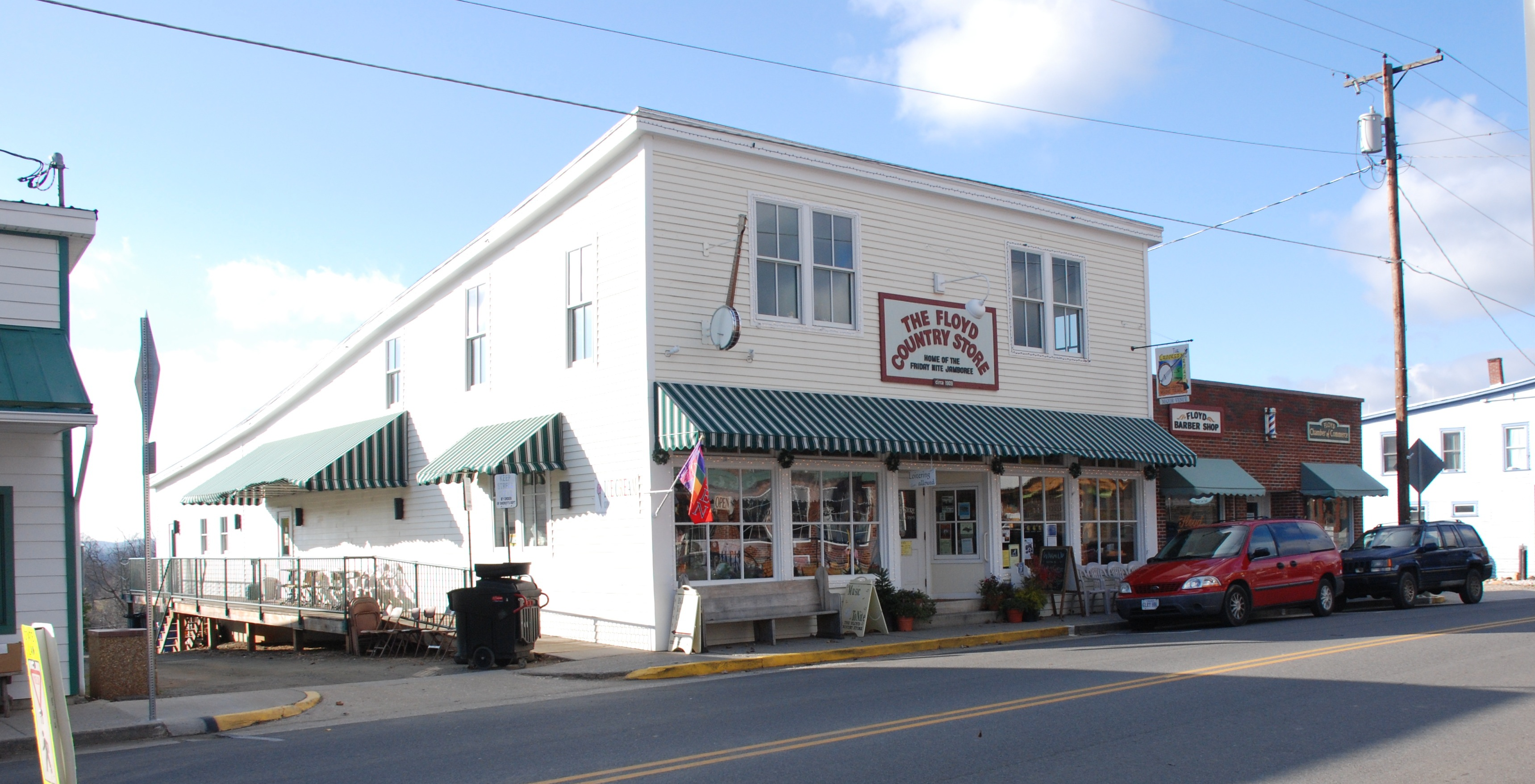
Floyd Country Store, the location of the "Friday Night Jamboree" of old-time string band and bluegrass music

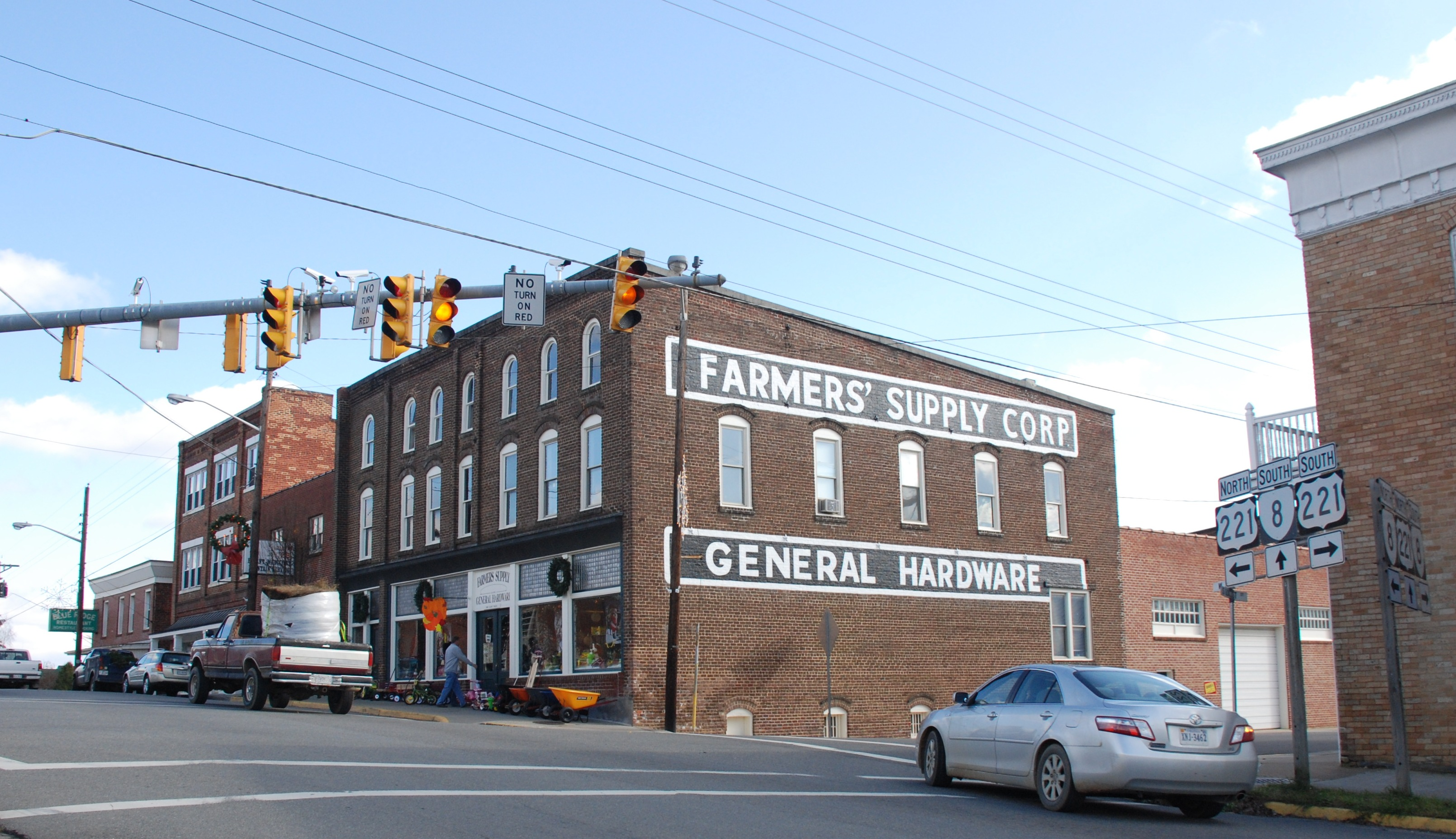
Hardware store at the main intersection

== Geography ==
According to the United States Census Bureau, the town has a total area of 0.5 square mile (1.2 km^{2}), all land.

=== Climate ===
The climate in this area is characterized by hot, humid summers and generally mild to cool winters. According to the Köppen Climate Classification system, Floyd has a humid subtropical climate, abbreviated "Cfa" on climate maps.

== Demographics ==
Historical population
Census	Pop.	Note	%±
1860	372		—
1870	321		−13.7%
1900	402		—
1910	369		−8.2%
1920	390		5.7%
1930	450		15.4%
1940	479		6.4%
1950	493		2.9%
1960	487		−1.2%
1970	474		−2.7%
1980	411		−13.3%
1990	396		−3.6%
2000	432		9.1%
2010	425		−1.6%
2020	448		5.4%
U.S. Decennial Census

As of the census of 2000, there were 432 people, 238 households, and 117 families residing in the town. The population density was 942.3 people per square mile (362.6/km^{2}). There were 264 housing units at an average density of 575.9 per square mile (221.6/km^{2}). The racial makeup of the town was 93.29% White, 4.63% African American, 0.23% Asian, 0.23% Pacific Islander, 0.69% from other races, and 0.93% from two or more races. Hispanic or Latino of any race were 0.69% of the population.

There were 238 households, out of which 18.5% had children under the age of 18 living with them, 34.0% were married couples living together, 12.6% had a female householder with no husband present, and 50.8% were non-families. 49.6% of all households were made up of individuals, and 31.1% had someone living alone who was 65 years of age or older. The average household size was 1.82 and the average family size was 2.57.

In the town, the population was spread out, with 18.5% under the age of 18, 4.6% from 18 to 24, 22.7% from 25 to 44, 23.4% from 45 to 64, and 30.8% who were 65 years of age or older. The median age was 48 years. For every 100 females, there were 70.8 males. For every 100 females age 18 and over, there were 66.0 males.

The median income for a household in the town was $25,781, and the median income for a family was $40,938. Males had a median income of $27,232 versus $19,464 for females. The per capita income for the town was $23,557. About 10.4% of families and 13.2% of the population were below the poverty line, including 7.5% of those under age 18 and 16.9% of those age 65 or over.

== Arts and culture ==
The Town of Floyd is becoming known as a regional destination for music, especially bluegrass music, and old-time music. The Floyd Country Store's Friday Night Jamboree, which features local and area bands, has been held each Friday night for many years, gaining in popularity during the past decade. In fair weather, the indoor stage performances and dancing are joined by simultaneous banjo-and-fiddle-centered jam sessions in driveways and seating areas along South Locust Street. Local old time string band The Alum Ridge Boys & Ashlee won first prize at the 85th Annual Old Fiddlers' Convention held in Galax, Virginia. County Sales, a notable music distribution company founded by David Freeman focusing on old-time, bluegrass and related music, was based in Floyd from 1973 until closing permanently in 2024.

Floyd is also home to a large counter-culture movement. There are other musical venues and stages in the town, featuring many different styles of music. The Winter Sun, a complex in downtown Floyd, frequently hosts shows for bands. The National Music Festival, focused on classical music, hosted its first season in Floyd in 2011.

Floyd is the location of Red Rooster Coffee.

== Education ==
Floyd County Schools includes Floyd County High School

== Notable people ==
- Donna Polseno, visual artist known for pottery, ceramics, and sculpture
- Curtis Turner, former NASCAR driver
- Darian Grubb, NASCAR Crew Chief
- Don Williams, Major League Baseball pitcher
- Morgan Wade, singer

== See also ==
- National Register of Historic Places in Floyd County, Virginia
- Chateau Morrisette Winery
