= Hemlock =

Hemlock may refer to:

== Plants ==
- Conium maculatum, a poisonous herbaceous plant
  - more broadly, other species in the genus Conium; not to be confused with the related water hemlock and hemlock water-dropwort
- Tsuga, a genus of coniferous trees

== Places ==
=== Communities in the United States ===
- Hemlock, Indiana
- Hemlock, Michigan
- Hemlock, New York
- Hemlock, Ohio
- Hemlock, Tillamook County, Oregon
- Hemlock, Virginia
- Hemlock, Washington
- Hemlock, Fayette County, West Virginia
- Hemlock, Jackson County, West Virginia
- Hemlock, Wisconsin
- Hemlock Township, Columbia County, Pennsylvania

=== Bodies of water ===
- Hemlock Creek (disambiguation)
- Hemlock Falls (disambiguation)
- Hemlock Lake, one of the Finger Lakes in New York
- McKay Lake (Ottawa), formerly known as Hemlock Lake

== Music ==
- Hemlock (band), an American heavy metal band
- Hemlock Ernst, the moniker used by American singer and rapper Samuel T. Herring
- Hemlock Recordings, a British record label founded by musician Untold
- "Hemlock", a song from Peter Hammill's 1988 album In A Foreign Town

== Computing ==
- Hemlock (text editor), a variant of the Emacs text editor for Unix
- Hemlock (Evergreen series / Radeon HD 5970), a graphics card code-name

== Other ==
- Babe and Carla Hemlock, Mohawk visual artists
- Hemlock (painting), a 1956 painting by Joan Mitchell
- Hemlock Society, an American suicide advocacy group
- Hemlock Society (film), a 2012 Indian film
- Hemlock Semiconductor Corporation, American manufacturer

== See also ==
- Ham Lock
