= Simpkinstown, Virginia =

Unincorporated community in Virginia, US

Coordinates: 37°00′46″N 80°34′13″W

Simpkinstown is an unincorporated community in Pulaski County, in the U.S. state of Virginia. Although listed as a community, the area is considered "Snowville" by local residents.
