= Poff =

Poff may refer to:

- Poff, Virginia, United States
- Tallinn Black Nights Film Festival (Estonian: Tallinna Pimedate Ööde Filmfestival, PÖFF)
- poff, a command used to control the Point-to-Point Protocol daemon

== People ==
- John Poff (born 1952), American baseball player
- Jonathan Poff (born 1983), New Zealand rugby union player
- Lon Poff (1870–1952), American actor
- Richard Harding Poff (1923–2011), American politician and judge
