= Snowville Historic District =

Historic district in Virginia, United States

- U.S. National Register of Historic Places
- U.S. Historic district
- Virginia Landmarks Register
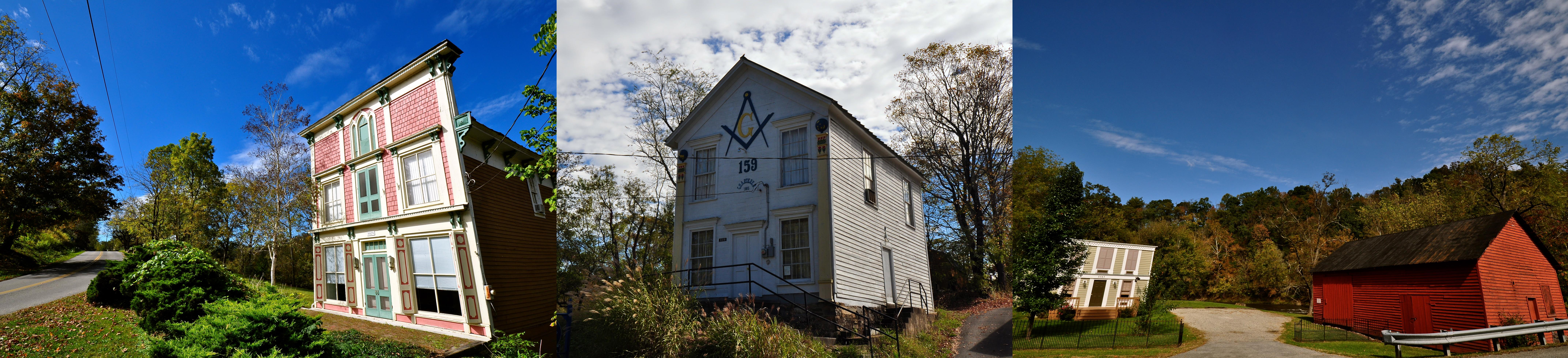

- Location within Virginia Location within the United States
- Location: VA 693, Snowville, Virginia
- Coordinates: 37°02′03″N 80°33′42″W
- Area: 76 acres (31 ha)
- Built: 1850
- Architect: Snow, Asiel; Et al.
- Architectural style: Greek Revival
- NRHP reference No.: 86003650
- VLR No.: 077-0048

Significant dates
- Added to NRHP: January 7, 1987
- Designated VLR: December 17, 1985

Snowville Historic District is a national historic district located at Snowville, Pulaski County, Virginia. It encompasses 44 contributing buildings in the village of Snowville. It includes a variety of residential, commercial, and industrial buildings dated as early as the 1850s. Notable buildings include the Snowville Milling Complex (1856-1857), Elmore House, Snow-Bullard House, "Humility," Snowville school (1880s), Masonic temple (1865), Reese Blacksmith Shop, and the store and village post office. Located in the district is the separately listed Snowville Christian Church.

It was added to the National Register of Historic Places in 1987.
