= Little River (New River tributary) =

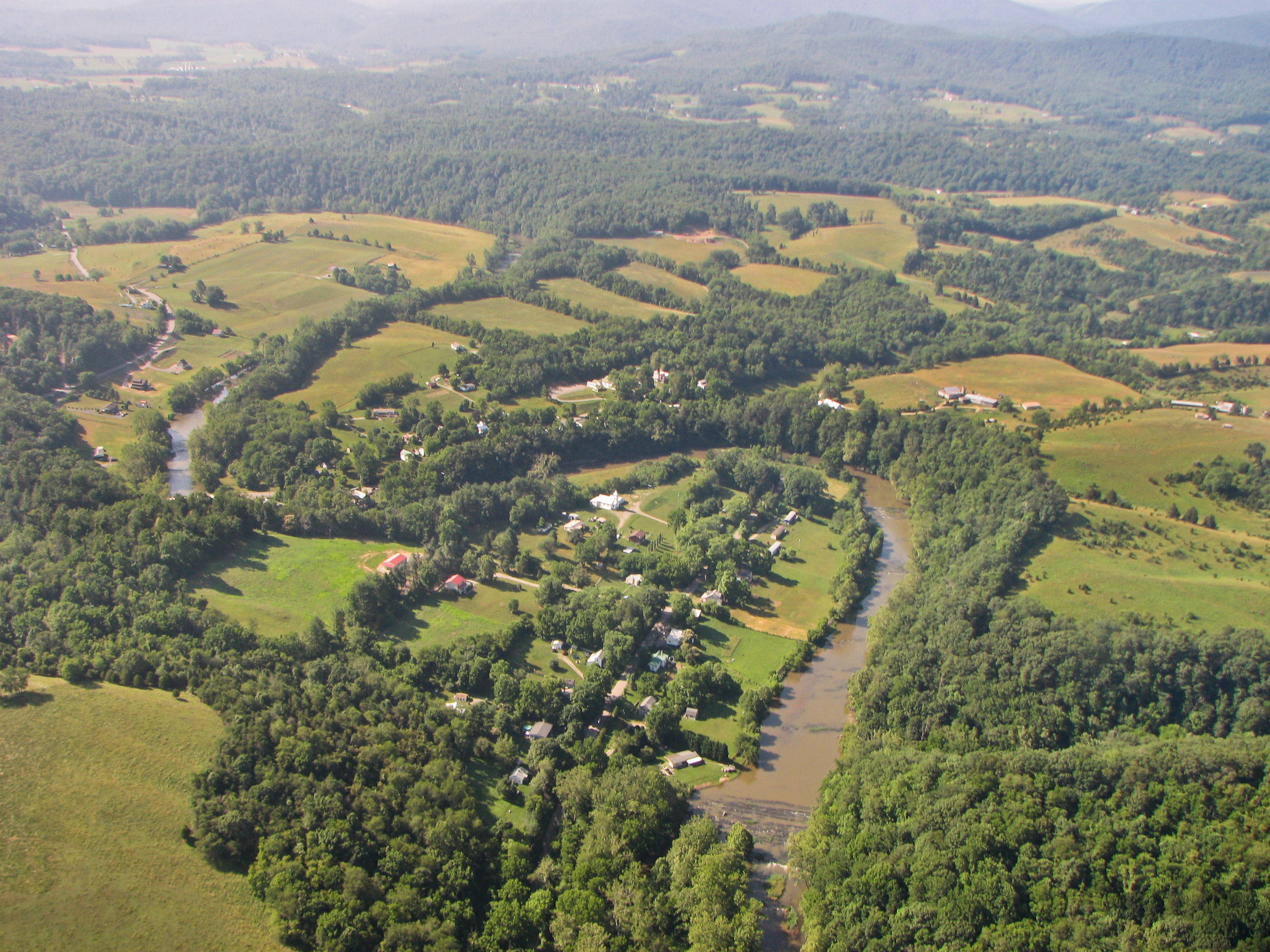
- The Little River at Snowville, Virginia, as viewed from approximately 1000 feet AGL looking towards the south-southeast.

Location
- Country: United States
- State: Virginia
- Counties: Floyd VA, Montgomery VA, Pulaski VA

Physical characteristics
- Source
  - location: Copper Hill, VA
  - coordinates: 37°04′41″N 80°06′42″W
  - elevation: 2,756 ft (840 m)
- 2nd source: West Fork Little River
  - location: Black Ridge, Floyd County, VA
  - coordinates: 36°51′28″N 80°23′14″W
  - elevation: 2,487 ft (758 m)
- Source confluence
  - location: Floyd County, VA
  - coordinates: 36°58′15″N 80°21′30″W
  - elevation: 2,123 ft (647 m)
- Mouth: New River
  - location: Radford, Virginia, VA
  - coordinates: 37°04′55″N 80°34′40″W
  - elevation: 1,795 ft (547 m)
- Length: 65 mi (105 km)
- Discharge
  - location: Snowville, VA
  - average: 359 cu ft/s (10.2 m^{3}/s)
  - minimum: 31 cu ft/s (0.88 m^{3}/s)
  - maximum: 22,800 cu ft/s (650 m^{3}/s)

Basin features
- Tributaries
  - left: Big Laurel Creek, Burks Run, Big Indian Creek
  - right: Big Branch, Brush Creek, Camp Creek, Dodd Creek

The Little River, a tributary of the New River, is approximately 65 miles long in southwest Virginia in the United States.

It rises in two forks in Floyd County near the Blue Ridge Parkway. It flows NNW along the Floyd/Montgomery County line and then along the Pulaski/Montgomery County line and joins the New River just downstream from the Claytor Lake dam in Pulaski County near the city of Radford.

The middle and lower portion of this very scenic waterway is suitable for paddling mostly in the spring or after heavy rains. There are several Class 1,2 rapids and two class 3 rapids and one fairly treacherous Class 4 rapid. Portions are stocked with trout by the Virginia Division of Game and Inland Fisheries.

== See also ==
- List of rivers of Virginia
