= Snowville =

Snowville may refer to:

- Snowville, Michigan
- Snowville, New Hampshire
- Snowville, Utah
- Snowville, Virginia
