= Japanese hemlock =

Japanese hemlock may refer to:

- Tsuga diversifolia, or northern Japanese hemlock
- Tsuga sieboldii, or southern Japanese hemlock

== See also ==
- Dendrolimus superans, or Japanese hemlock caterpillar
- Hemlock (disambiguation)
