= Shelors Mill, Virginia =

Unincorporated community in Virginia, United States

Shelors Mill
- Unincorporated community
- Location within the Commonwealth of Virginia Shelors Mill (the United States)
- Coordinates: 36°52′32″N 80°22′24″W
- Country: United States
- State: Virginia
- County: Floyd
- Time zone: UTC−5 (Eastern (EST))
  - Summer (DST): UTC−4 (EDT)

Shelors Mill is an unincorporated community in Floyd County, Virginia, United States.
