= Mabry Mill =

Watermill in Virginia

Coordinates: 36.7509°N 80.406°W

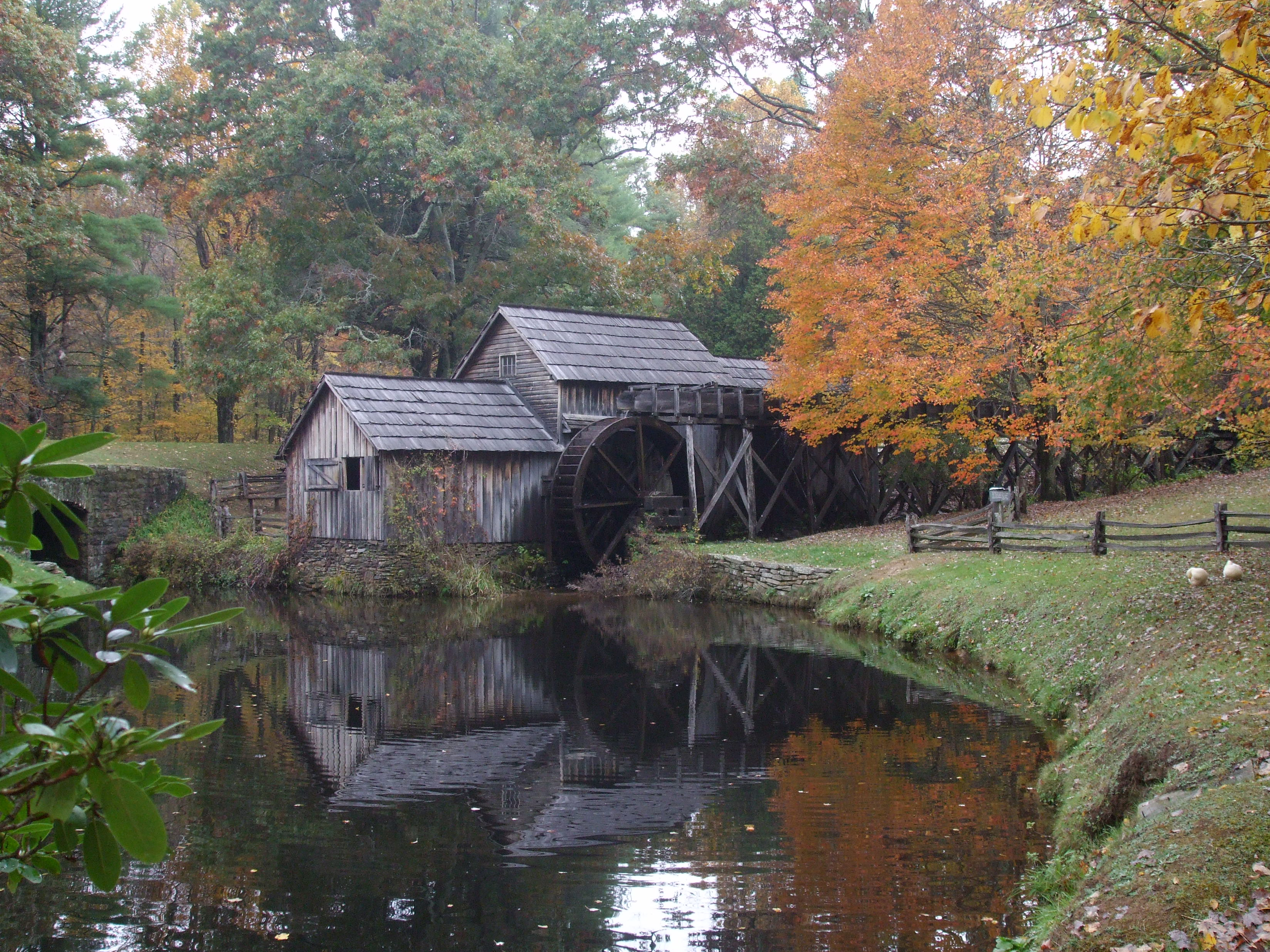
Mabry Mill

Mabry Mill is a watermill located at mile 176.2 of the Blue Ridge Parkway in Floyd County, Virginia, United States, just north of the community of Meadows of Dan. Originally a privately owned working mill, it is now a popular tourist attraction run by the National Park Service. A short trail around the mill connects historical exhibits about life in rural Virginia. The trail allows visitors to view the gristmill, sawmill, and blacksmith shop.

Water wheel and gear diagram of Mabry Mill

Mabry Mill was built by Edwin Boston Mabry (E. B. Mabry). He returned to Floyd County in 1903 and began constructing the mill. It was first a blacksmith and wheelwright shop, then became a sawmill. By 1905, it was in operation as a gristmill. By 1910, the front part of the mill was completed; it included a lathe for turning out wheel hubs, a tongue-and-groove lathe, a planer and a jigsaw. Between 1905 and 1914 Mabry bought adjacent tracts of land, mostly for the purpose of acquiring more water power.

During peak seasons, demonstrations of crafts are given by National Park Service volunteers at Mabry Mill.
