= Carthage, Virginia =

Unincorporated community in Virginia, United States

- Unincorporated community
- Location within the Commonwealth of Virginia Carthage (the United States)
- Coordinates: 36°58′03″N 80°29′45″W
- Country: United States
- State: Virginia
- County: Floyd
- Time zone: UTC−5 (Eastern (EST))
  - Summer (DST): UTC−4 (EDT)

Carthage is an unincorporated community in Floyd County, Virginia, United States.
