= Huffville, Virginia =

Unincorporated community in Virginia, United States

- Unincorporated community
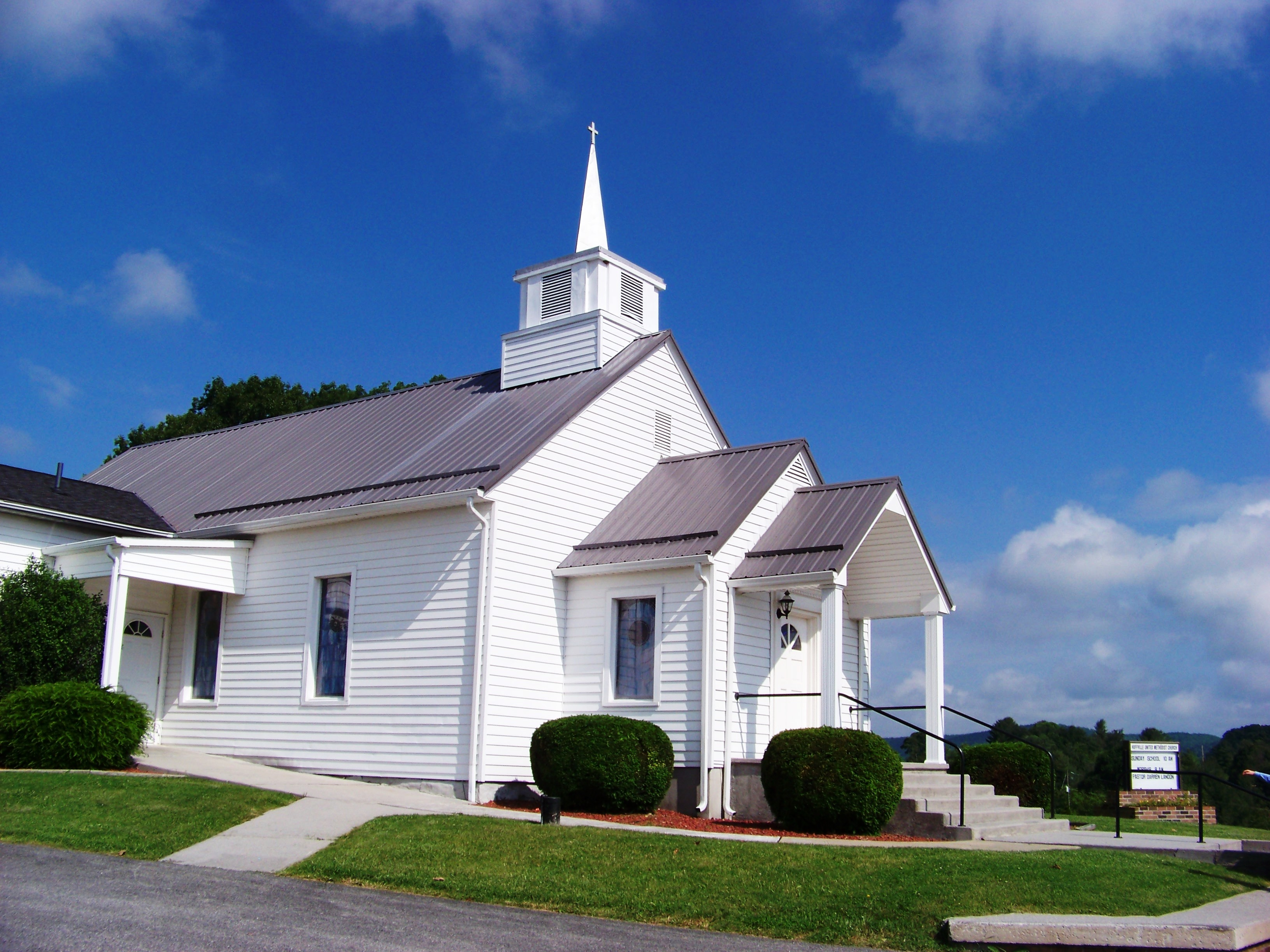
- Huffville United Methodist Church

- Location within Virginia Location within the United States
- Coordinates: 37°03′44″N 80°17′07″W
- Country: United States
- State: Virginia
- County: Floyd
- Time zone: UTC−5 (Eastern (EST))
  - Summer (DST): UTC−4 (EDT)

Huffville is an unincorporated community in Floyd County, Virginia, United States.
