= Conners Grove, Virginia =

Unincorporated community in Virginia, United States

- Unincorporated community
- Location within the Commonwealth of Virginia Conners Grove (the United States)
- Coordinates: 36°47′47″N 80°25′05″W
- Country: United States
- State: Virginia
- County: Floyd
- Time zone: UTC−5 (Eastern (EST))
  - Summer (DST): UTC−4 (EDT)

Conners Grove is an unincorporated community in Floyd County, Virginia, United States.
