= Check, Virginia =

Unincorporated community in Virginia, United States

- Unincorporated community
- Location within Virginia Location within the United States
- Coordinates: 37°02′05″N 80°09′56″W
- Country: United States
- State: Virginia
- County: Floyd
- Elevation: 2,582 ft (787 m)
- Time zone: UTC-5 (Eastern (EST))
  - Summer (DST): UTC-4 (EDT)
- ZIP code: 24072
- Area code: 540
- GNIS feature ID: 1464762

Check is an unincorporated community in Floyd County, Virginia, United States. It is located on U.S. Route 221, 12.1 miles (19.5 km) northeast of Floyd. Check has a post office with ZIP code 24072, which opened on July 23, 1883. The origin of the name "Check" is obscure.

Check contains a primary school, Check Elementary School, which is located in the old Check High School building.
