= Rocky Knob Recreation Area =

Protected area in Virginia, United States

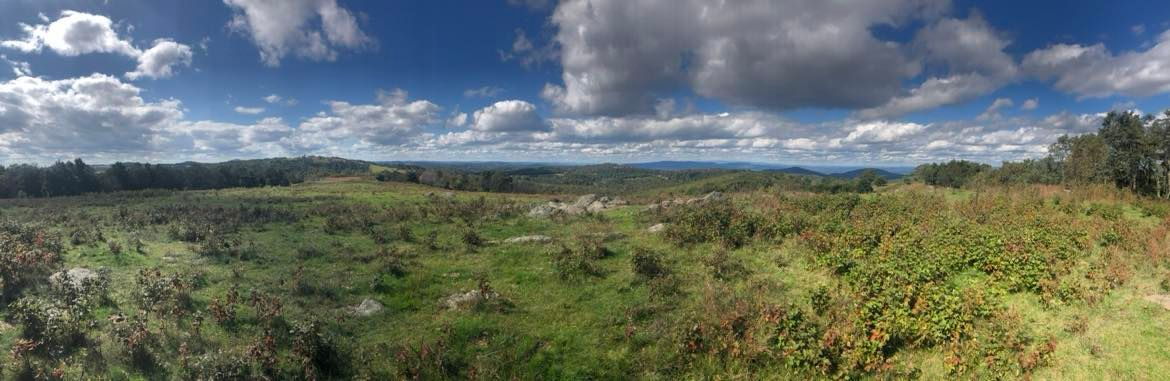
- Photo from Black Ridge trail in Rocky Knob Recreation Area

- Location within Virginia Location within the United States
- Location: Floyd and Patrick counties in Virgnina
- Nearest city: Floyd, Virginia
- Coordinates: 36°48′N 80°21′W
- Governing body: National Park Service
- Website: www.nps.gov/blri/planyourvisit/rocky-knob.htm

Rocky Knob Recreation Area is a 4,500 acres (7 sq mi) recreation area along the Blue Ridge Parkway, which spans from mile markers 167–174. The park is home to 15 miles (24 km) of hiking trails, 81 tents camping sites, 28 RV sites, and 72 picnic sites. The campground is open seasonally, typically from May–October. Rocky Knob is also home to Rock Castle Gorge, a 3,500 acres (5 sq mi) gorge, and home to the Rock Castle Gorge National Recreation Trail. The trail drops 1,000 feet (300 m) in elevation in three miles (4.8 km), and backpackers can request a backcountry camping permit from the National Park Service.

== History ==
Rocky Knob Recreation area was one of the first of five recreation areas developed along the Blue Ridge Parkway, and is one of the largest recreation areas within the entirety of the park. The backcountry campsite, accessible via a loop trail into the gorge, is on the cite of a former Civilian Conservation Corps (CCC) camp. By the summit of Rocky Knob is a trail shelter, which was one of the first buildings constructed along the entirety of the Parkway. The shelter was constructed for the Appalachian Trail, which ran through the recreation area until its relocation to Jefferson National Forest in 1952. The area was a large focus for the CCC, with very ambitions plans, including a swimming pool, a lodge, a car service station, campground, lake, and hiking trails. Only some of these amenities were built. Before the CCC camp closed in 1941, the corps planted several hundred blight resistant Chinese chestnut trees to replace the American versions lost in previous decades.

== Trails ==
There are four main trails, and 15 miles (24 km) of trails within Rocky Knob Recreation area.

- Rock Castle Gorge Trail (10.8 miles (17.4 km) strenuous loop)
- Black Ridge Trail (3 miles (4.8 km) moderate loop)
- Rocky Knob Picnic area Trail (1 mile (1.6 km) easy loop)
- Smart View Trail (2.6 miles (4.2 km) moderate loop), located 14.5 miles (23.3 km) south of the visitors center.
