= Hemlock Creek =

Hemlock Creek may refer to:

- Hemlock Creek (New York), a stream in New York
- Hemlock Creek (Fishing Creek tributary), a stream in Pennsylvania
- Hemlock Creek (Yellow River tributary), a stream in Wisconsin
- Hemlock Creek (Lake Erie), a watershed administered by the Long Point Region Conservation Authority, that drains into Lake Erie

== See also ==
- Hemlock Run
