= Simpsons, Virginia =

Unincorporated community in Virginia, United States

- Unincorporated community
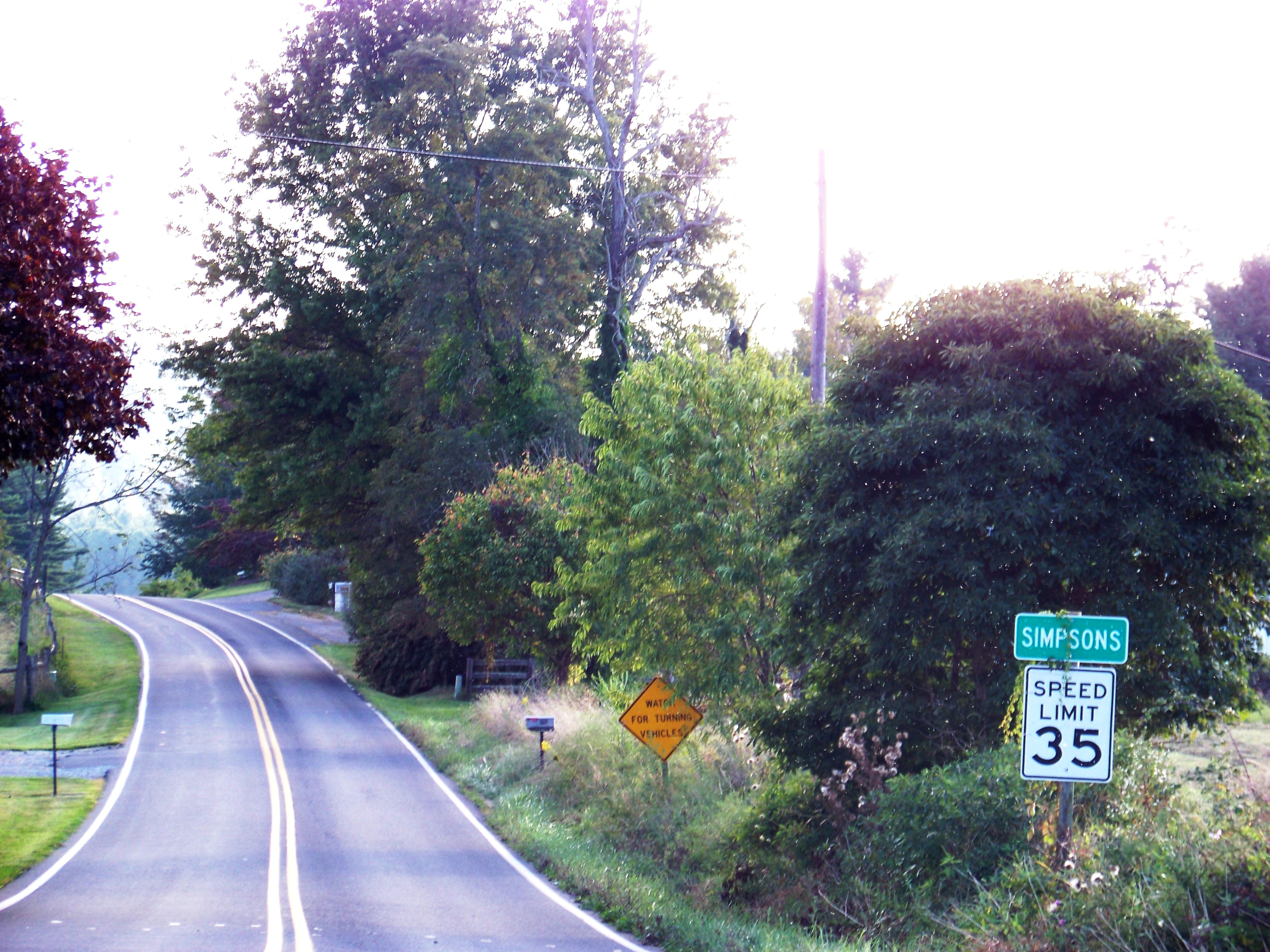

- Location within Virginia Location within the United States
- Coordinates: 37°02′16″N 80°12′16″W
- Country: United States
- State: Virginia
- County: Floyd
- Time zone: UTC−5 (Eastern (EST))
  - Summer (DST): UTC−4 (EDT)

Simpsons is an unincorporated community in Floyd County, Virginia, United States.
