= Snowville, Virginia =

- Census-designated place (CDP)
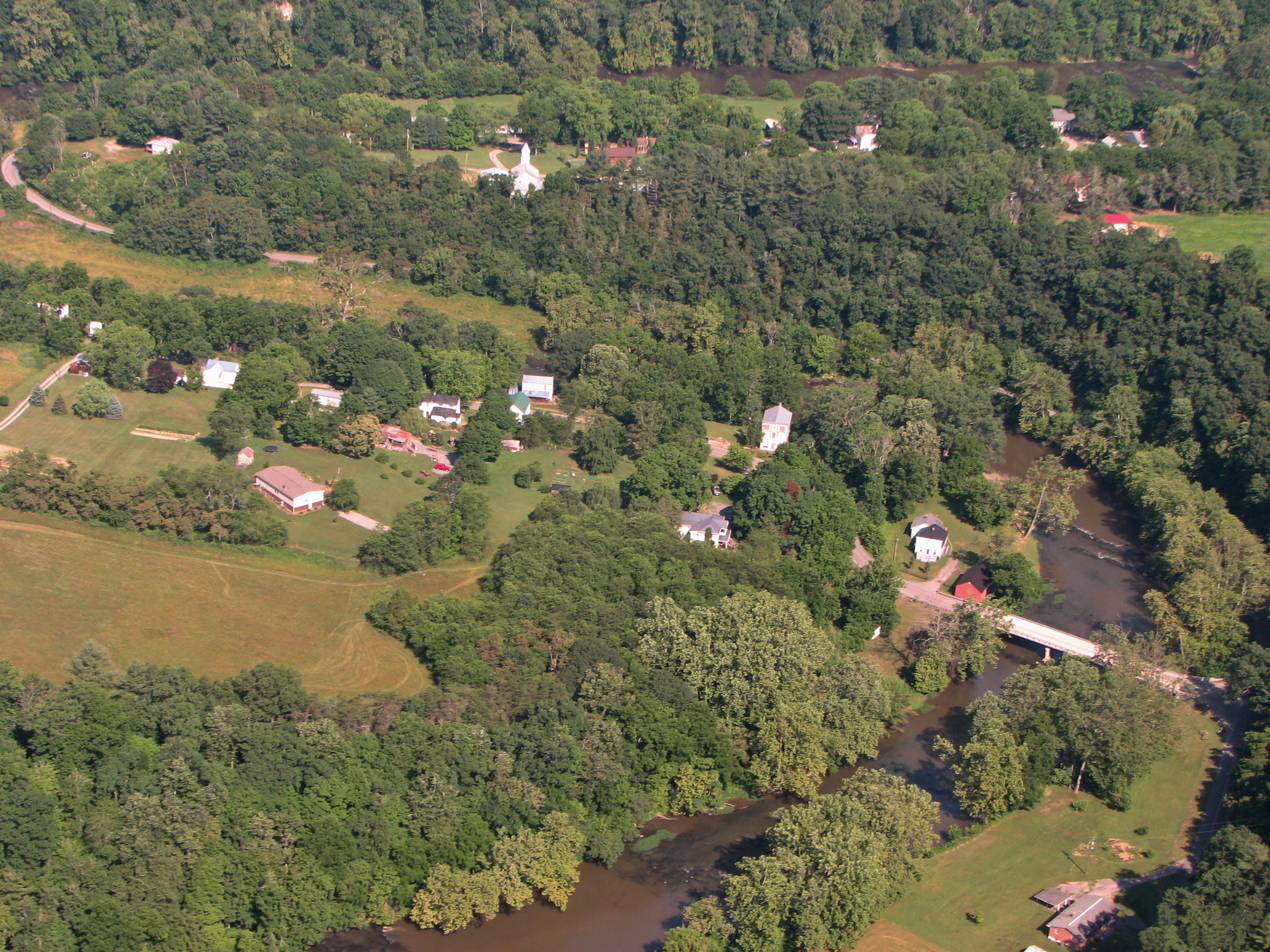
- The community of Snowville along the Little River

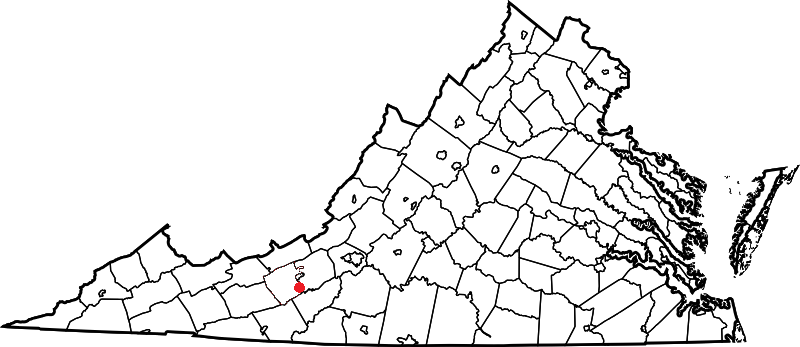
- Location of Snowville, Virginia
- Coordinates: 37°1′57″N 80°33′40″W
- Country: United States
- State: Virginia
- County: Pulaski
- Elevation: 1,939 ft (591 m)

Population (2010)
  - Total: 149
  - Density: 15/sq mi (5.9/km^{2})
- Time zone: UTC−5 (Eastern (EST))
  - Summer (DST): UTC−4 (EDT)
- ZIP code: 24347
- Area code: 540

Snowville is a census-designated place (CDP) located in southeastern Pulaski County in the Commonwealth of Virginia, United States. As of the 2020 census, Snowville had a population of 125. It is part of the Blacksburg–Christiansburg Metropolitan Statistical Area.

== Geography and climate ==
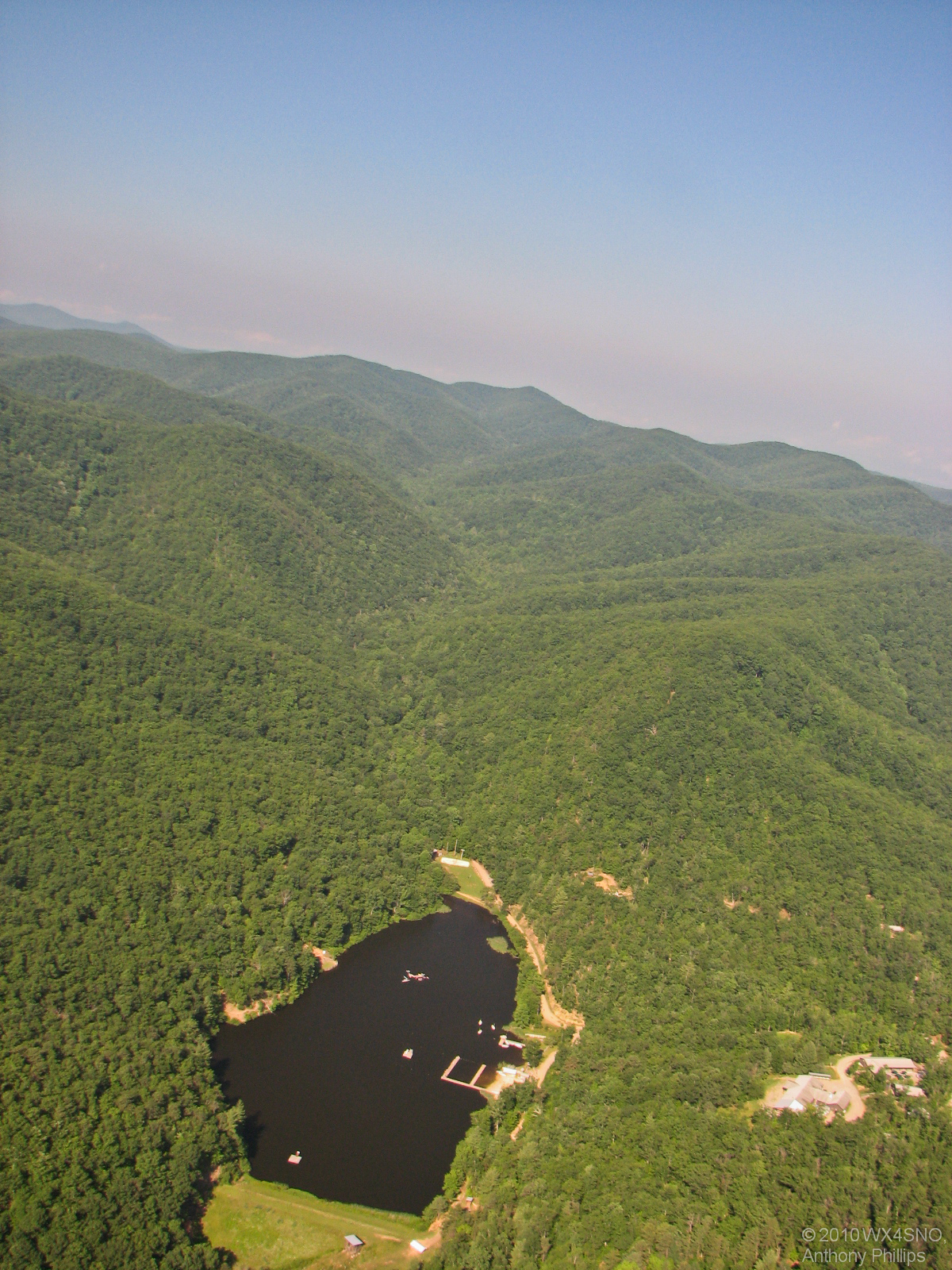
Lake Ottari and the Blue Ridge Scout Reservation. These mountains mark the southern edge of Snowville.

Snowville lies along the Little River, which forms the boundary between Pulaski County on the west side and Montgomery County on the east. Snowville lies within the Blue Ridge Mountains, part of the Appalachian Mountain Range, with High Knoll Mountain and Bench Mountain marking the southern extent of the community. It is bounded to the north by Claytor Lake.

Snowville and Pulaski County are located in a temperate climatic zone, with average winter temperatures in the 30s and 40s (degrees Fahrenheit) and summer temperatures in the 70s and 80s. Average winter snowfall amounts range from 12 to 24 inches (300 to 610 mm). During spring, flash flooding can occur with runoff from nearby mountains, and during fall tropical storms can bring heavy amounts of rainfall and damaging winds, such as during Hurricane Hugo in 1989. Research has been undertaken at Virginia Tech and at the National Weather Service office in Blacksburg to examine the potential for flash flooding along creeks, streams, and rivers in Pulaski County using geographic information systems (GIS) and field methods. Extreme heat and drought are rare, but have occurred, as have very cold temperatures below 0 °F (−18 °C).

=== Weather and Climate History ===
The worst river flooding in Snowville's recorded history occurred on August 14, 1940, with the passage of a slow-moving tropical depression. The 1940 hurricane season produced eight storms, four of which were hurricanes. Around August 5 of that year, a tropical storm was detected along the northern Leeward Islands in the West Indies. The storm brought wind gusts of 44 mph to San Juan, Puerto Rico as it moved northwestward. By August 6 it began a turn to the north while producing rough seas in the southeastern Bahamas. Four days later on August 10 the S.S. Maine off the southeast coast measured hurricane-force winds and the storm began movement again toward the northwest. The storm made landfall as a category 1 hurricane on August 11 at approximately 4 PM near Beaufort, South Carolina (along the SC/GA border). Winds reached 73 mph in nearby Savannah, Georgia.

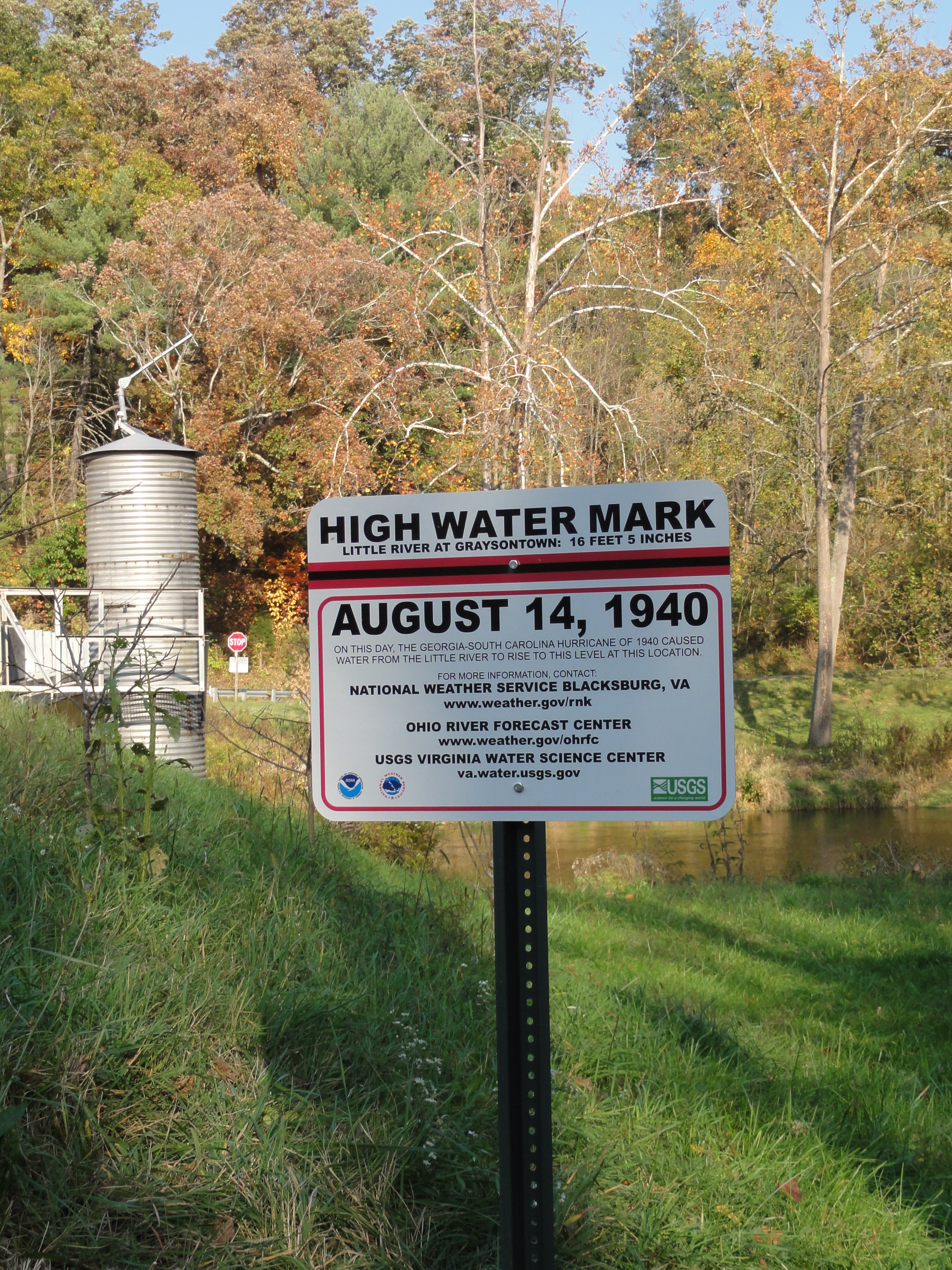
High-water mark sign along the Little River in Snowville. The USGS stream gauge can be seen in the background on the left.

As the Georgia-South Carolina hurricane of 1940 moved inland, record rainfall amounts were observed from South Carolina north through the Smoky Mountains and into southwest and central Virginia. The storm meandered along the Cumberland Plateau region as rain began falling in Virginia on August 13. The mountainous terrain coupled with extremely slow movement from the now tropical depression produced copious amounts of rain. Copper Hill in Floyd County, Virginia received the highest rainfall in the state: 17.03".

The United States Geological Survey (USGS) stream gauge located at the Snowville bridge along the Little River (see photo at right) measured an all-time record height of 16 feet 5 inches which is more than 15 higher than what is normally observed throughout the year. Downstream in Radford, Virginia residents in low-lying areas were forced to evacuate their homes and both the former Burlington Mills and the Lynchburg Foundry manufacturing plants were shut down because of high water. The road leading from Radford into Pulaski County towards Claytor Lake Dam was inundated and impassable. No deaths were reported across southwest Virginia, but several million dollars' worth of damage occurred (1940 USD).

On October 18, 2011, a sign recognizing the historic flooding was installed along the Little River at the Graysontown-Snowville bridge. The sign was donated by local resident Anthony Phillips, a hydrometeorologist from Snowville, Virginia and installation was sponsored by the National Weather Service and the United States Geological Survey through the High Water Mark (HWM) Project. The project helps raise awareness of flood risk by installing high-water mark signs in prominent locations within communities that have experienced severe flooding.

More recently in 2004, the remnants of Hurricane Jeanne produced flooding when the Little River reached a height of 11 feet 4 inches, the ninth-highest crest of all time.

== Demographics ==
Historical population
Census	Pop.	Note	%±
2010	149		—
2020	125		−16.1%
U.S. Decennial Census; 2010 2020

Snowville was first listed as a census designated place in the 2010 U.S. census.

Snowville currently does not have a post office and subsequently a zip code, thus no demographics exist exclusively for the community. The following demographics are for Hiwassee, Virginia, which includes Snowville, hereafter in the demographics section referred to as "the Greater Hiwassee-Snowville community" or simply "the community".

According to the United States Census Bureau there were 1,865 people, 757 occupied households, and 576 families residing in the Greater Hiwassee-Snowville community in 2000. The racial makeup of the community was 97.4% White, 1.8% African American, 0.3% Native American, 0.0% Asian, 0.1% Pacific Islander, 0.0% from other races, and 0.5% from two or more races. Hispanic or Latino of any race were 0.3% of the population in 2000.

Of the 1,865 residents in the Greater Hiwassee-Snowville community, 18.7% were under the age of 15, while 4.6% were between 15 and 19, 4.7% between 20 and 24, 12.5% between 25 and 34, 15.6% between 35 and 44, 16.2% between 45 and 54, 7.0% between 55 and 59, and 19.8% of the population was older than 59 years. The median age was 40.4 years. There were slightly fewer females than males in 2000, 50.3% were males while 49.7% were females.

The median income for a household in the community was $32,950, and the median income for a family was $42,188. Males had a median income of $30,068 versus $24,500 for females. The per capita income for the community was $15,812. 9.4% of families and 10.5% of the population were below the poverty line.

The mean travel time to work was approximately 29.9 minutes with 84.3% of the population commuting alone to work, 12.7% carpooling, and approximately 3.0% walking. 53.3% of residents indicated they were employed in the labor force while 1.7% claimed unemployment status; 45.1% of residents were not in the labor force in 2000. 87.0% of those working were employed by the private sector, while 11.4% worked for the government, 0.8% were self-employed, and 0.8% were unpaid family workers.

== Early history ==
=== Founding of Snowville ===
Asiel Snow, founder of Snowville, circa 1880s.

Today, Snowville is a small community nestled in the Blue Ridge Mountains; however, decades and even centuries before, it was a prosperous and well-known town, even eclipsing Roanoke at one time.

Early in the 19th century a cabinet maker by the name of Asiel Snow moved from Massachusetts to what is now Christiansburg, Virginia. Shortly thereafter, a customer, who resided in what was later to be called Snowville, ordered a cabinet and Snow was charged with delivering it. On his journey through the area, Snow noticed the potential for water power present along the Little River and envisioned a town along its banks. It wasn't long after, in 1833, that he moved his entire family to what would later become Snowville, which bore his name.

On August 13, 1850, the community was designated "The Foundry" and formally became a small community. Three months later, on November 18, 1850, it was renamed "Humility". It wasn't until March 31, 1854, that the town was given the name "Snowville" after Asiel Snow.

In addition to Snow's family, several of his friends and their families also settled the area, including the Slenkers, the Bullards, and the Bills. Additionally, families from nearby areas also made the town their home; they included the Amens, Millers, Palmers, Godbys, Winstons, Graysons, Bishops, and Abels. Several of these families have relatives residing near Snowville today. Across the Little River and just downstream on the Montgomery County side, the Graysons established Graysontown. These families had various backgrounds and skills. The Slenkers were skilled in the textiles; the Bills were merchants and promoters; the Snows, Palmers, Godbys, and Winstons were millwrights and carpenters; and the Bullards were tanners and shoemakers. This variety of skilled artisans, coupled with the town's location, was the cornerstone for future development and allowed Snowville to become an established and prosperous town.

=== Industry and commerce ===
The mountains surrounding Snowville were, and in many places still are, rich with iron ore. One of the first factories established in Snowville was a trip-hammer forge. It was located at the confluence of Little Laurel and Big Laurel creeks (near present-day Blue Ridge Mountains Council property) and was operated by Asiel Snow and his son-in-law, David B. Bill. Cast and wrought iron products were transported to Snowville by wagons and oxen carts. The cast iron was collected as scrap and later made into stoves, kettles, corn shellers, cane mills, and many more other cast-iron products. The wrought iron on the other hand was quickly produced into horseshoes and horseshoe nails, buckboards and buggies, and hearses; it was also used in forgings for sawmills, gristmills, and cane mills.

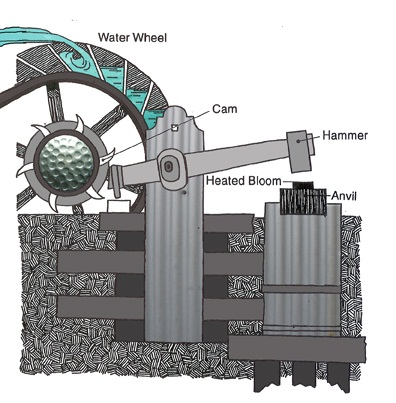
Diagram of a trip-hammer forge, not unlike the one established at the confluence of Little Laurel and Big Laurel Creeks in Snowville during the mid-1800s.

Several years later the trip-hammer forge was moved to Snowville with a three-story adjacent building. The first floor housed machinery for the production of linseed oil which was made from flax seed found nearby. The second floor was used for sawing trees that had been transported from the nearby mountains. The lumber was used in for new buildings and factories. Finally, on the third floor, there was mill which took wool and converted it into men's jeans and dresses for women.

An important woolen mill was started by the Messrs just before the start of the Civil War. However, with tensions rising between the North and the South, the mill went unfinished; Isaac Slenker completed the three-story mill just after the close of the war. The mill brought radical change to Snowville's social life. People from near and far brought their wool to Snowville to be converted into jeans, blankets, and woolen carpets. This interaction between residents and those from other areas brought Snowville into a wider contact with the outside world.

On the west end of the town, a tannery was operated by W. S. Bullard. Tanning is the process of making leather, which does not easily decompose, from the skins of animals, which do. Visitors and residents today can still see the large open pits where the leather was tanned along Route 693 and the "bottom lands".

Another factory was the big shoe factory located along the Little River. Known as the Red Barn (due to the building's color), this shoe factory was one of the greatest manufacturing plants of its day in southwestern Virginia. The shoes were distributed across Virginia and the Mid-Atlantic states, and one might even ask any old-time Virginian, "Who has not worn those good, honest boots and shoes made at Snowville?"

Various other factories and shops existed over the years. During the Civil War, swords and Bowie knives were made in Snowville for the Confederate Army and delivered to Christiansburg where they were shipped out. Joe Craft operated a barrel factory which produced whiskey barrels and flour containers, as well as wooden washtubs. There are records of eggs being brought from the surrounding countryside to Snowville, where they were sold for merchandise, then packed into barrels with wood shavings and sawdust, and finally sent to large cities. In another building, bird feathers and down feathers were made into pillows and feather beds.

Moonshining and the illicit distilling of liquor has occurred in Snowville since its earliest beginnings. Two known stills were in operation near Snowville during the middle of the 19th century. One was operated by Benjamin Ridpath, the other by Joseph Covey. A third known still was located in Montgomery County outside of Snowville and was operated by Crockett Meredith, but had little effect on the community. During the middle and late 20th century, a large still operation was present near Buck Hollow Ridge and Big Laurel Creek. It was operated by Walter Grubb, along with the help of Staunt Phillips who transported the alcohol by way of a super-charged automobile. Although rare today, the art and science of distilling spirits in the mountains is rumored to still be present (see External Links section).

=== Postal service ===
Postal mail was not delivered daily in Snowville's early years; it usually came once, and occasionally, twice a week. It arrived from Christiansburg by a post rider on horseback or by mule. Records from the Post Office Department in Washington indicate the first post office was established on August 13, 1850. The following are the postmasters, their appointment dates, and the town's name at the time:

Postmaster	Appointment Date	Township
Chester Bullard	August 13, 1850	The Foundry
Reuben J. Ruke	March 11, 1852	Humility
Chester Bullard	March 25, 1854	Humility
Stillman B. Snow	March 31, 1854	Snowville
John Carmical	December 31, 1857	Snowville
William T. Shelor	November 4, 1858	Snowville
Joseph H. Winston	January 29, 1866	Snowville
William H. Smith	May 27, 1872	Snowville
Joseph H. Covey	May 3, 1881	Snowville
Joseph H. Winston	September 25, 1883	Snowville
James W. Bocock	July 20, 1885	Snowville
David J. Showalter	June 10, 1889	Snowville
William Showalter	October 28, 1890	Snowville
Clifton E. Elmore	October 27, 1893	Snowville
Genetho S. Hall	July 6, 1897	Snowville
Thomas H. Elmore	April 4, 1914	Snowville
Lonnie C. Elmore	October 1, 1949	Snowville
Miss Martha J. Bill	May 16, 1950	Snowville

Currently, residents in Snowville receive their mail through the Hiwassee post office, since the Snowville office closed in the latter half of the 20th century.

=== Religion ===
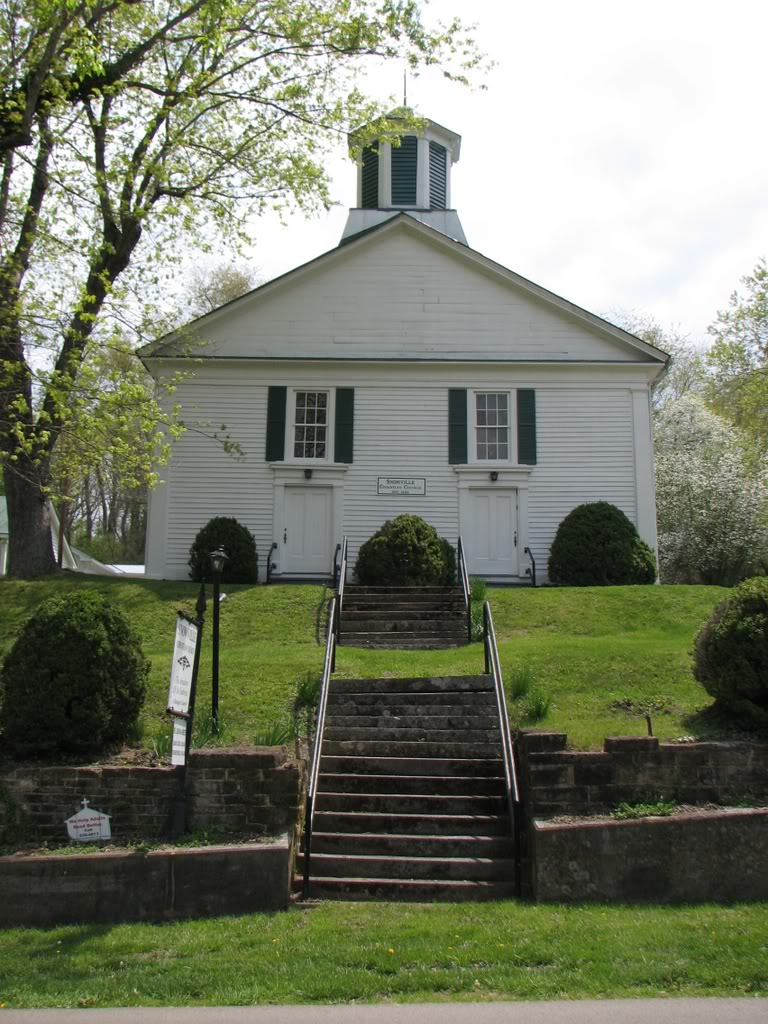
Snowville Christian Church, est. 1833. National Register of Historic Places Record Number 406134.

In 1870, the first formal church organization and structure was established in Snowville under the leadership of Asiel Snow. Known as Snowville Christian Church, the building had a large balcony for African Americans. The large bell was donated by Miss Mary Snow just prior to her death. It tolled, for the first time, to announce Miss Snow's death. When tolling was a practice, a death would be announced by the tapping of the bell three times by an attachment especially made for that purpose; this was then followed by individual strokes, one for each year of life, to indicate the age of the deceased. The Snowville bell was famous for its unusual toll, which could be heard 7 miles (11 km) east in the town of Auburn.

Snowville has long been regarded as the Jerusalem of the Southwest in reference to its ties to the Christian Church (Disciples of Christ). It has long been regarded as the center of the denomination's movement in Virginia and considered by some to be the seat of the only true, New Testament Christian Church. Dr. Chester Bullard, the brother-in-law to Asiel Snow, is credited for establishing several churches within the Disciples of Christ, both in Snowville and elsewhere. Dr. Bullard was raised in Montgomery County and studied medicine under Dr. P. J. Chapman of Giles County, Virginia.

A cemetery and a cave were both named for Dr. Bullard. He preferred above-ground burials rather than underground entombment and thus obtained a cave which lies along the Little River. Here he placed his son, a daughter, and two wives. Unverified reports claim that four bodies were later moved to Snowville Cemetery. Dr. Bullard's grave is located in Bullard Cemetery (also known as Snowville Cemetery) just south of Snowville.

Several prominent ministers arose from the historic Snowville Church, including J. T. Showalter, J. T. Taylor, J. D. Honaker, W. S. Bullard, F. F. Bullard, W. H. Book, and Bernard Smith.

Historical records indicate several troubles between members and officials within the church. During the Civil War the controversy was between Dr. Bullard and Cephus Shelburne and the issue of secession and slavery. Later, the debate was between J. R. Miller, J. T. Showalter, and W. S. Bullard over the use of organs and other musical instruments in church worship. Today, organs and music originating from Snowville Christian Church can be heard for several miles.

=== Early education ===
Education in Snowville first began in the form of private schools which were usually held in residents' homes. In 1858 the first public school was created and housed in a building originally constructed as a woolen mill. A few years later the school was moved to another building on a hillside behind main street.

The support for education was largely from private donations and subscriptions. Additionally, those students who were enrolled above the fourth grade paid $2.50 tuition per month.

Later, in 1884, the Pulaski County School Board appropriated funds and constructed a three-room schoolhouse. A four-year high school and seven-year elementary school was located at the west end of the town. Some additional classes were held in an old store building near Little River. For many years, students would travel from miles around to board and receive their education here. At one time, Snowville nearly had a junior college. Around 1922, however, because of a decrease in student enrollment, Snowville High School began offering only two years of education instead of four. Several years later, high school students were transported to Draper to attend school there.

=== Other facts ===
- Each winter, residents enjoyed skating on the Little River once it froze. Today, the river rarely gets cold enough to freeze.
- The Library Association of Snowville, headed by Ed Howery, was one of the largest in the area around 1890.
- The Masonic Lodge No. 159 in Snowville was chartered on December 13, 1865, and is one of the oldest in the region. Their motto is "never say die".
- The first newspaper printed in Snowville was entitled The Virginia People. When the newspaper was discontinued, the machinery was moved to Christiansburg for use in printing the Montgomery Messenger.
- Snowville never had a saloon or bar, although at least two individuals petitioned for one. Alcohol was obtained from bootlegging and illegal stills, some of which were operated by women living adjacent to Snowville.
- A regiment of soldiers numbering around 13,000 passed through Snowville during the Civil War, much to the excitement of residents. They took over a half day to pass through the town.
- Fox hunting for sport was popular during the early history of Snowville.
- The Snowville Historic District was added to the National Register of Historic Places in 1987.

=== Snowville's decline ===
Following the end of the Civil War, Snowville began to see a decrease in production and an overall decline. The most prominent event that led to this decline was the establishment of the railroad which completely bypassed Snowville, running through Christiansburg and Radford. With this, residents began to leave the once-prosperous town to find work in the city.

== Snowville today ==
Today, Snowville is a sleepy little community with things moving at a slower pace. This is important as residents enjoy a simpler way of life away from the hustle and bustle of the nearby towns. However, residents usually seek employment in neighboring locales, or operate one of the agricultural farms nearby. Until recently, many residents worked at the Radford Foundry which was owned and operated by INTERMET Corp. The manufacturing plant closed in late 2003 with the loss of over 370 jobs. The Radford Army Ammunition Plant also currently employs residents from the community, as do several other large manufacturing facilities in the NRV.

As previously stated, the Snowville Post Office closed in the latter half of the 20th century and residents now receive mail through the post office in Hiwassee.

Younger students (grades K-5) attend Snowville Elementary School, located along Route 693 just west of the old town. Middle school students are transported to Dublin and attend Dublin Middle School, while high school students attend Pulaski County High School, also located in Dublin. Students seeking higher education commonly enroll at New River Community College, Radford University, or Virginia Tech.

Snowville is home to Camp Ottari, a Boy Scout camp. Ottari, along with Camp Powhatan to the west, are part of the Blue Ridge Scout Reservation, which comprises over 16,000 acres (65 km^{2}) of mountain land.

A comparison of a portion of Snowville in 2010 (left) and from the 1800s (right) when the town was at its peak. The left image shows the relatively new Snowville Bridge, along with the old theater (center right) and the Mason Lodge. The older image shows the foundry, woolen mill, flour mill, theater (center), and store. The old image is courtesy of Tami Ramsey and from the Early History of Snowville by Louise B. Allison.

== See also ==
- Pulaski County, Virginia
