= Hemlock Falls (disambiguation) =

Hemlock Falls is a waterfall located in Rabun County, Georgia.

Hemlock Falls may also refer to:

- Hemlock Falls (Cloudland Canyon), Georgia
- Hemlock Falls (Oregon)
- A waterfall in South Mountain Reservation, New Jersey
- Several waterfalls in Nova Scotia
- A mystery series by Mary Stanton
