= Hemlock Creek (Yellow River tributary) =

Stream in Wisconsin, U.S.

Coordinates: 44°16′45″N 90°07′04″W

Hemlock Creek is a stream in the U.S. state of Wisconsin. It is a tributary to the Yellow River.

Hemlock trees along the creek's watercourse may account for the name.
