= Copper Hill, Virginia =

Unincorporated community in Virginia, United States

- Unincorporated community
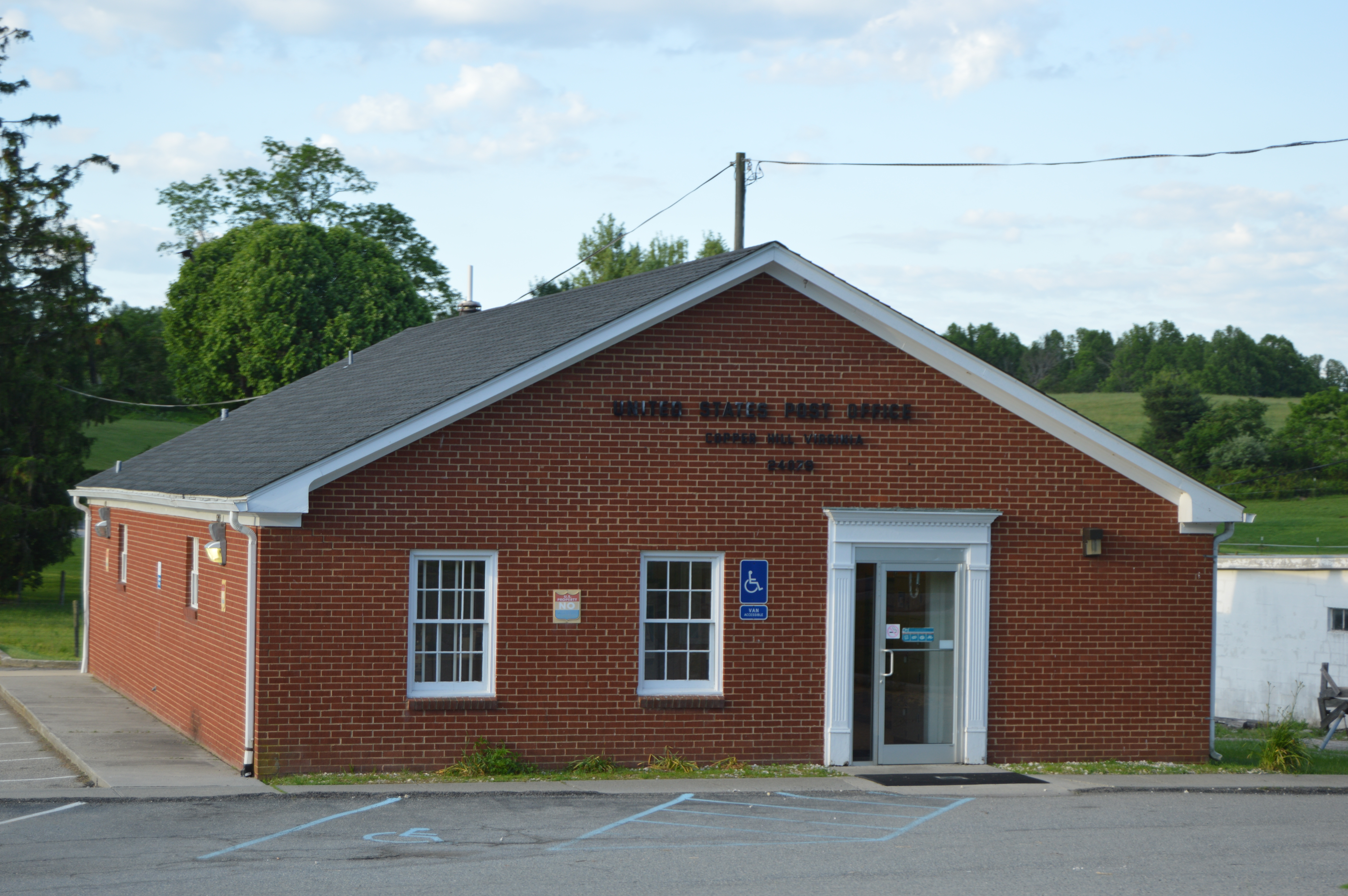
- Post office

- Location within the Commonwealth of Virginia Copper Hill (the United States)
- Coordinates: 37°04′54″N 80°08′03″W
- Country: United States
- State: Virginia
- County: Floyd
- Elevation: 2,500 ft (760 m)

Population (2010)
  - Total: 1,758
- Time zone: UTC−5 (Eastern (EST))
  - Summer (DST): UTC−4 (EDT)
- Area code: 540

Copper Hill is an unincorporated community in Floyd County, Virginia, United States. The settlement is located southwest of Roanoke.

== Climate ==
The climate in this area is characterized by hot, humid summers and generally mild to cool winters. According to the Köppen Climate Classification system, Copper Hill has a humid subtropical climate, abbreviated "Cfa" on climate maps.
