= Floyd County, Virginia =

County in Virginia, United States

- County
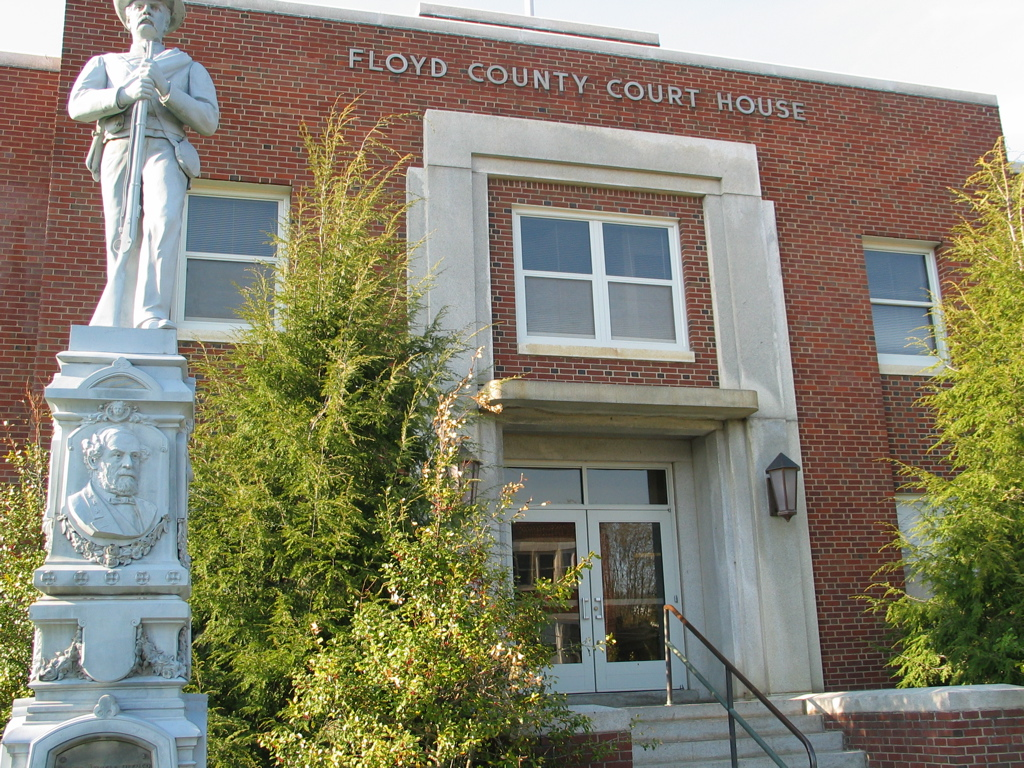
- Floyd County Courthouse and Confederate Monument

- Flag Seal Logo

- Location within the U.S. state of Virginia
- Coordinates: 36°56′N 80°22′W
- Country: United States
- State: Virginia
- Founded: 1831
- Named for: John Floyd
- Seat: Floyd
- Largest town: Floyd

Area
  - Total: 382 sq mi (990 km^{2})
  - Land: 381 sq mi (990 km^{2})
  - Water: 0.9 sq mi (2.3 km^{2}) 0.2%

Population (2020)
  - Total: 15,476
  - Estimate (2025): 15,789 ▲
  - Density: 41/sq mi (16/km^{2})
- Time zone: UTC−5 (Eastern)
  - Summer (DST): UTC−4 (EDT)
- Congressional district: 9th
- Website: www.floydcova.gov

Floyd County is a United States county located on a high plateau of the Blue Ridge Mountains in the Commonwealth of Virginia. With a population of 15,476, as of the 2020 census, the county is included in the Blacksburg-Christiansburg, VA Metropolitan Statistical Area. The Floyd County seat is the similarly named small town of Floyd.

The county was established in 1831 from part of Montgomery County, and was named after then Governor John Floyd. In the 1960s and 1970s, Floyd proved popular with people in the era's counterculture, particularly those who wanted to live in closer contact with nature. The county has a rich musical heritage, including hosting the annual FloydFest music and arts festival.

== History ==
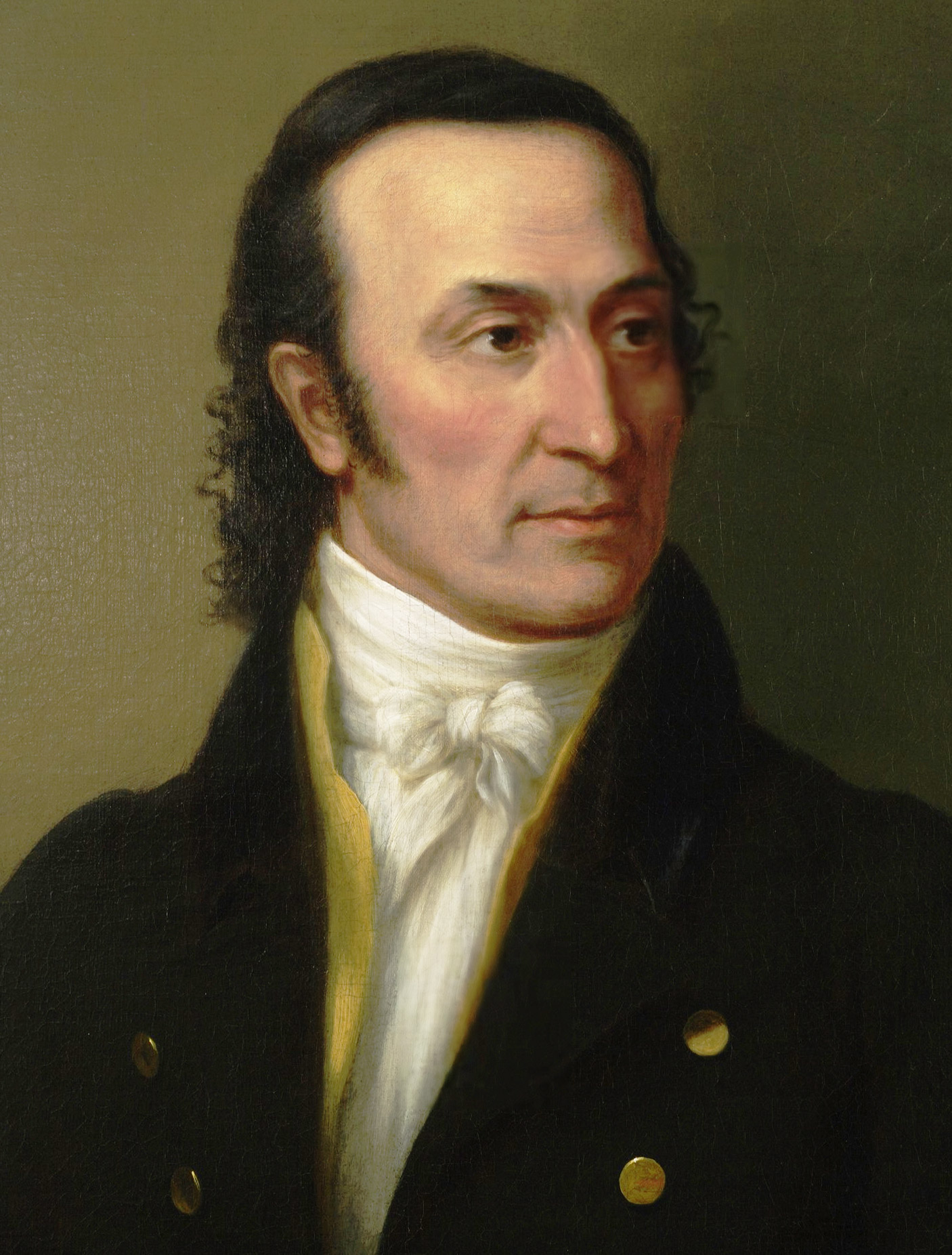
Portrait of John Floyd, for whom Floyd County was named

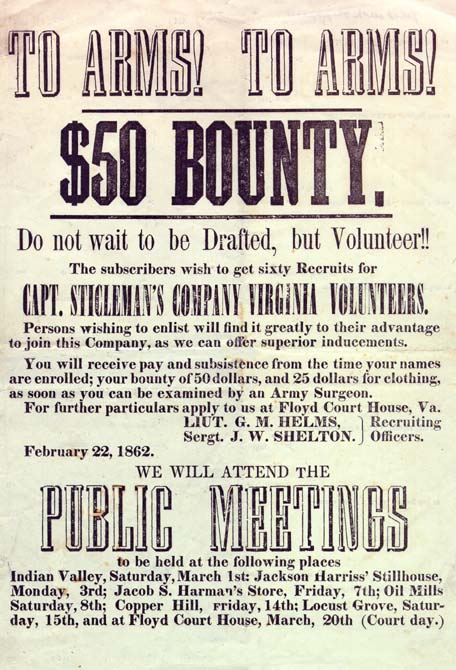
A recruitment poster for the Virginia Volunteers from Floyd County in 1862, during the American Civil War

Floyd County's recorded history begins with the arrival of traders, trappers and hunters in Southwest Virginia in the 18th century. The earliest known travel way through present day Floyd County was the Trader's Path, running from east to west across the Roanoke River where Back Creek enters the river, by John Mason's, R. Poage's, the headwaters of Back Creek and southwest over Bent Mountain. The trail continued westward through the Little River area to the Lead Mines.

The first known attempts to settle the area appear to have been made during the 1740s. In 1745 the Virginia Council granted James Patton, of Augusta County, among others, 100,000 acres (400 km^{2}) on the New River and the westward flowing waters, including the Little River area. In 1749 the Royal Company of Virginia also received a grant on the westward flowing waters, putting the two companies in competition with one another to settle the area. The first surveying of the land occurred in the late 1740s.

On January 15, 1831, the General Assembly of Virginia passed an act creating the present county of Floyd out of the county Montgomery. The new county was named for the then Governor of Virginia, John Floyd. The new county's courthouse was completed in 1834. In 1870 a portion of Franklin County was added to Floyd County. The first Commonwealth's Attorney was William Ballard Preston, a nephew of John Floyd, who would later serve as Secretary of the United States Navy. Preston was followed in later years by Jubal Early, who would later serve as a general for the Confederate States Army.

The county seat of Floyd County was first called Jacksonville for Andrew Jackson, the seventh President of the United States from 1829 to 1837. Jacksonville was first incorporated in 1858 and then re-incorporated on February 19, 1892, to expand the town boundaries. On January 23, 1896, the General Assembly passed an Act officially changing the name of the town from Jacksonville to Floyd.

The county became a destination for those involved in the counterculture during the 1960s and 1970s, particularly those who wanted to live in closer contact with nature. In the late 1990s, the Rivendell community was established by a group of Christians so they could practice a lifestyle consistent with their Reformed Church's interpretations of the Bible and also, in part, to be better isolated from possible societal disruptions caused by the year 2000 problem. Most of the original members of this community have moved on.

Floyd County was also a setting for the ministry of Reverend Bob Childress, whose life was chronicled in the book The Man Who Moved a Mountain.

The county's location directly adjacent to both the Roanoke and the Blacksburg-Christiansburg Metropolitan Statistical Areas have contributed to modest population growth in contrast to most rural counties in Southwest Virginia. Several bloggers live in the county and frequently post observations about the community and its rural setting.

Floyd County also has a strong music and literary scene. Three establishments in Floyd regularly offer a variety of live music during the weekends ranging from traditional styles such as Bluegrass and Old-time music to contemporary and alternative acts. Best known is the Friday Night Jamboree held at The Floyd Country Store. Both the Floyd Country Store and County Sales, founded in the 1960s, are featured on the Virginia Heritage Music Trail called "The Crooked Road." In the early 21st century, Floyd became the home of an annual world music festival called FloydFest. Floyd County-based old time string band The Alum Ridge Boys & Ashlee won first prize at the 85th Annual Old Fiddlers' Convention held in Galax, Virginia.

The Chateau Morrisette and Villa Appalaccia wineries have been established since the 1980s.

== Geography ==
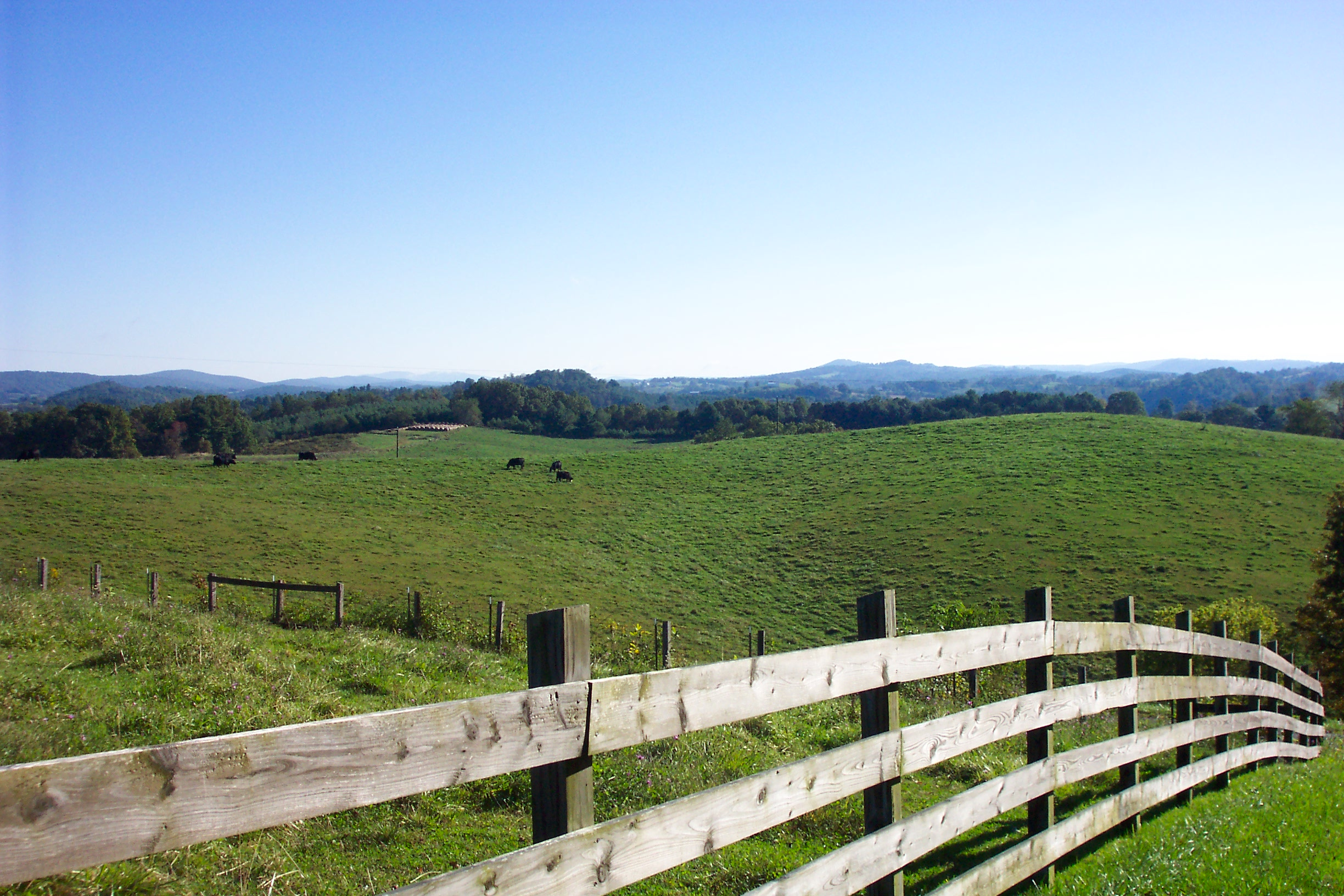
Rolling hills of Floyd County.

According to the United States Census Bureau, the county has a total area of 381.8 square miles (988.9 km^{2}), of which 380.9 square miles (986.5 km^{2}) is land and 0.9 square miles (2.3 km^{2}) (0.2%) is water. It is located in the Blue Ridge Mountains of southwestern Virginia. Floyd County is one of the 423 counties served by the Appalachian Regional Commission, and it is identified as part of "Greater Appalachia" by Colin Woodard in his book American Nations: A History of the Eleven Rival Regional Cultures of North America.

The county seat, the town of Floyd, is 40 miles (64 km) southwest of Roanoke on US 221. Buffalo Mountain, at 3,971 feet (1,210 m), is the highest point in the county.

Floyd County is situated atop a high plateau of the Blue Ridge Mountains which divides the eastward flowing from the westward flowing waters. With the high topography, no streams flow into Floyd County. The county is drained primarily by Little River and its tributaries which flow into New River below the Claytor Lake Dam and, in turn, by way of the Kanawha River, the Ohio River and the Mississippi River, into the Gulf of Mexico.

The Little River, the county's largest waterway, is formed by three main branches, or forks: the East, West, and South (also known as Dodd's Creek). It is said that no water flows into Floyd County.

The headwaters of the south fork of the Roanoke River are in the northeastern part of the county. One particular fast stream is Shooting Creek, named for its speed over rocks. This creek today follows Shooting Creek Road from Floyd into Franklin County. In was once the site of moonshine liquor distilleries and the lawlessness that surrounded this industry.

=== Adjacent counties ===
- Franklin County – east
- Patrick County – southeast
- Carroll County – southwest
- Pulaski County – northwest
- Montgomery County – northwest
- Roanoke County – north

=== Protected areas ===
- Blue Ridge Parkway (part), including Rocky Knob Recreation Area (part)
- Buffalo Mountain Natural Area Preserve

=== Major highways ===
- US 221
- SR 8
- US 58
- Blue Ridge Parkway

== Demographics ==
Historical population
Census	Pop.	Note	%±
1840	4,453		—
1850	6,458		45.0%
1860	8,236		27.5%
1870	9,824		19.3%
1880	13,255		34.9%
1890	14,405		8.7%
1900	15,388		6.8%
1910	14,092		−8.4%
1920	13,115		−6.9%
1930	11,698		−10.8%
1940	11,967		2.3%
1950	11,351		−5.1%
1960	10,462		−7.8%
1970	9,775		−6.6%
1980	11,563		18.3%
1990	12,005		3.8%
2000	13,874		15.6%
2010	15,279		10.1%
2020	15,476		1.3%
2025 (est.)	15,789	▲	2.0%
U.S. Decennial Census; 1790-1960 1900-1990; 1990-2000 2010 2020

=== Racial and ethnic composition ===
Floyd County, Virginia – Racial and ethnic composition Note: the US Census treats Hispanic/Latino as an ethnic category. This table excludes Latinos from the racial categories and assigns them to a separate category. Hispanics/Latinos may be of any race.
Race / Ethnicity (NH = Non-Hispanic)	Pop 1980	Pop 1990	Pop 2000	Pop 2010	Pop 2020	% 1980	% 1990	% 2000	% 2010	% 2020
White alone (NH)	11,105	11,616	13,284	14,385	14,114	96.04%	96.76%	95.75%	94.15%	91.20%
Black or African American alone (NH)	378	292	274	270	234	3.27%	2.43%	1.97%	1.77%	1.51%
Native American or Alaska Native alone (NH)	6	16	12	19	18	0.05%	0.13%	0.09%	0.12%	0.12%
Asian alone (NH)	8	21	11	35	46	0.07%	0.17%	0.08%	0.23%	0.30%
Native Hawaiian or Pacific Islander alone (NH)	x	x	1	1	0	x	x	0.01%	0.01%	0.00%
Other race alone (NH)	13	1	12	16	72	0.11%	0.01%	0.09%	0.10%	0.47%
Mixed race or Multiracial (NH)	x	x	93	141	505	x	x	0.67%	0.92%	3.26%
Hispanic or Latino (any race)	53	59	187	412	487	0.46%	0.49%	1.35%	2.70%	3.15%
Total	11,563	12,005	13,874	15,279	15,476	100.00%	100.00%	100.00%	100.00%	100.00%

=== 2020 census ===
As of the 2020 census, the county had a population of 15,476. The median age was 47.5 years. 19.8% of residents were under the age of 18 and 24.4% of residents were 65 years of age or older. For every 100 females there were 99.7 males, and for every 100 females age 18 and over there were 98.7 males age 18 and over.

The racial makeup of the county was 91.9% White, 1.6% Black or African American, 0.1% American Indian and Alaska Native, 0.3% Asian, 0.0% Native Hawaiian and Pacific Islander, 1.6% from some other race, and 4.5% from two or more races. Hispanic or Latino residents of any race comprised 3.1% of the population.

0.0% of residents lived in urban areas, while 100.0% lived in rural areas.

There were 6,639 households in the county, of which 24.9% had children under the age of 18 living with them and 22.2% had a female householder with no spouse or partner present. About 29.3% of all households were made up of individuals and 14.6% had someone living alone who was 65 years of age or older.

There were 7,924 housing units, of which 16.2% were vacant. Among occupied housing units, 78.7% were owner-occupied and 21.3% were renter-occupied. The homeowner vacancy rate was 1.5% and the rental vacancy rate was 5.1%.

=== 2000 census ===
As of the census of 2000, there were 13,874 people, 5,791 households, and 4,157 families residing in the county. The population density was 36 people per square mile (14 people/km^{2}). There were 6,763 housing units at an average density of 18 units per square mile (6.9 units/km^{2}). The racial makeup of the county was 96.71% White, 2.00% Black or African American, 0.09% Native American, 0.09% Asian, 0.01% Pacific Islander, 0.36% from other races, and 0.74% from two or more races. 1.35% of the population were Hispanic or Latino of any race.

There were 5,791 households, out of which 29.10% had children under the age of 18 living with them, 59.90% were married couples living together, 8.10% had a female householder with no husband present, and 28.20% were non-families. 24.70% of all households were made up of individuals, and 10.80% had someone living alone who was 65 years of age or older. The average household size was 2.39 and the average family size was 2.83.

In the county, the population was spread out, with 22.20% under the age of 18, 6.90% from 18 to 24, 27.60% from 25 to 44, 27.40% from 45 to 64, and 15.90% who were 65 years of age or older. The median age was 40 years. For every 100 females there were 97.50 males. For every 100 females age 18 and over, there were 96.70 males.

The median income for a household in the county was $31,585, and the median income for a family was $38,128. Males had a median income of $30,886 versus $20,466 for females. The per capita income for the county was $16,345. About 8.50% of families and 11.70% of the population were below the poverty line, including 12.70% of those under age 18 and 15.30% of those age 65 or over.

== Communities ==
Town of Floyd

Other communities:

- Alum Ridge
- Burks Fork (c 1880–1930)
- Carthage
- Check
- Conners Grove
- Copper Hill
- Copper Valley
- Court House (c 1900–1920)
- Duncan
- Haycock
- Hemlock
- Huffville
- Indian Valley
- Laurel Branch
- Little River (c 1880–1930)
- Locust Valley (c 1900–1930)
- Mabry Mill
- Pizarro
- Poff
- Shelors Mill
- Simpsons
- Smart
- Sowers
- Terrys Fork
- Turtle Rock
- Union
- Weddle
- Willis

== Government and politics ==
Floyd County is an anomaly in Virginia politics, being a solidly Republican county even during the height of the Democratic "Solid South". This is due to the fact that the county's inhabitants largely deserted the Confederate army during the Civil War, so that it was one of very few white areas in antebellum slave states to endorse Radical Reconstruction. Over generations, this has translated into powerful party loyalty thereto. Floyd was the only Virginia county to vote for Herbert Hoover against Franklin Roosevelt in 1932, and the last Democrat to carry the county in a presidential election was Winfield S. Hancock in 1880. Theodore Roosevelt did win Floyd County in 1912 as a result of a split in the Republican Party, while Democratic Senatorial candidate Mark Warner carried the county in his landslide 2008 victory.

United States presidential election results for Floyd County, Virginia
Year	Republican		Democratic		Third party(ies)	
Year	No.	%	No.	%	No.	%
1880	345	26.14%	975	73.86%	0	0.00%
1884	1,097	56.00%	862	44.00%	0	0.00%
1888	1,482	60.37%	952	38.78%	21	0.86%
1892	954	47.46%	854	42.49%	202	10.05%
1896	1,525	63.86%	848	35.51%	15	0.63%
1900	1,566	70.60%	648	29.22%	4	0.18%
1904	1,012	68.75%	450	30.57%	10	0.68%
1908	1,149	74.47%	390	25.28%	4	0.26%
1912	222	16.31%	409	30.05%	730	53.64%
1916	893	65.42%	472	34.58%	0	0.00%
1920	1,355	72.65%	497	26.65%	13	0.70%
1924	984	65.04%	515	34.04%	14	0.93%
1928	1,481	77.38%	433	22.62%	0	0.00%
1932	1,051	59.99%	699	39.90%	2	0.11%
1936	1,566	68.90%	699	30.75%	8	0.35%
1940	1,482	66.94%	729	32.93%	3	0.14%
1944	1,424	69.06%	630	30.55%	8	0.39%
1948	1,266	72.55%	434	24.87%	45	2.58%
1952	1,626	71.69%	619	27.29%	23	1.01%
1956	1,970	70.46%	799	28.58%	27	0.97%
1960	1,933	70.06%	817	29.61%	9	0.33%
1964	1,836	61.51%	1,144	38.32%	5	0.17%
1968	2,275	64.32%	715	20.21%	547	15.47%
1972	2,444	76.11%	708	22.05%	59	1.84%
1976	2,071	52.76%	1,728	44.03%	126	3.21%
1980	2,447	56.60%	1,642	37.98%	234	5.41%
1984	3,431	67.69%	1,599	31.54%	39	0.77%
1988	2,921	61.69%	1,727	36.47%	87	1.84%
1992	2,575	48.44%	2,026	38.11%	715	13.45%
1996	2,374	48.07%	1,909	38.65%	656	13.28%
2000	3,423	59.64%	1,957	34.10%	359	6.26%
2004	4,162	61.81%	2,488	36.95%	84	1.25%
2008	4,441	59.09%	2,937	39.08%	138	1.84%
2012	4,673	61.13%	2,732	35.74%	239	3.13%
2016	5,293	65.74%	2,300	28.57%	458	5.69%
2020	6,225	66.17%	3,004	31.93%	179	1.90%
2024	6,551	67.77%	2,968	30.71%	147	1.52%

=== Board of Supervisors ===
- District A (Locust Grove District): Levi Cox (R)
- District B (Little River District): Linda DeVito Kuchenbuch (I)
- District C (Courthouse District): Jerry W. Boothe (D)
- District D (Burks Fork District): Joe D. Turman (R)
- District E (Indian Valley District): Kalinda Bechtold (R)

=== Constitutional officers ===
- Clerk of the Circuit Court: Rhonda T. Vaughn (R)
- Commissioner of the Revenue: Lisa Dawn Baker (R)
- Commonwealth's Attorney: Eric Branscom
- Sheriff: Brian Craig (R)
- Treasurer: Melissa M. "Missy" Keith (R)

Floyd is represented by Republican David R. Sutterlein in the Virginia Senate, Republican Wren M. Williams in the Virginia House of Delegates, and Republican H. Morgan Griffith in the U.S. House of Representatives.

== See also ==
- National Register of Historic Places in Floyd County, Virginia
- Floyd County High School
