= Snowville Christian Church =

Historic church in Virginia, United States

- U.S. National Register of Historic Places
- Virginia Landmarks Register
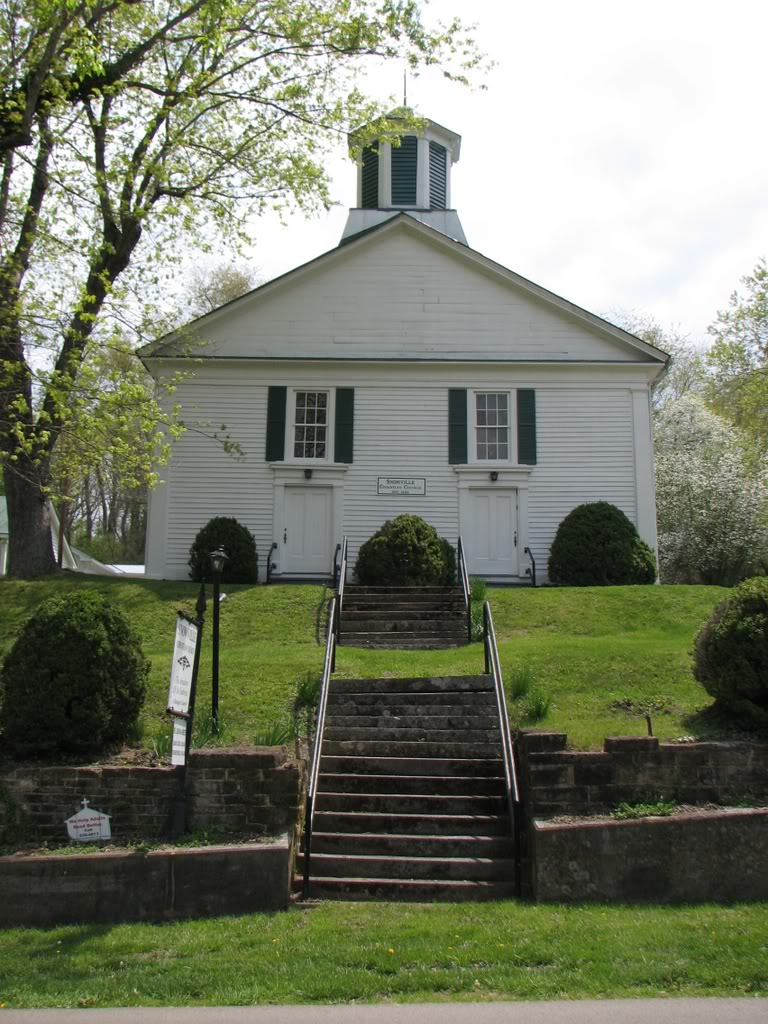
- Snowville Christian Church, June 2010

- Location within Virginia Location within the United States
- Location: VA 693, Snowville, Virginia
- Coordinates: 37°2′3″N 80°33′37″W
- Area: less than one acre
- Built: 1864
- Architectural style: Greek Revival
- NRHP reference No.: 87000563
- VLR No.: 077-0006

Significant dates
- Added to NRHP: April 2, 1987
- Designated VLR: December 9, 1986

Snowville Christian Church, also known as Cypress Grove Christian Church, is a historic Christian Church (Disciples of Christ) church complex located in Snowville, Pulaski County, Virginia. It was built in 1864, and is a one-story, gable-roofed frame church building. The building measures 40 feet by 60 feet. It features pattern-book Greek Revival style columns and pilasters and the principal facade is topped by an octagonal bell tower.

It was added to the National Register of Historic Places in 1987.
