= Lima Village Historic District =

Historic district in New York, United States

- U.S. National Register of Historic Places
- U.S. Historic district
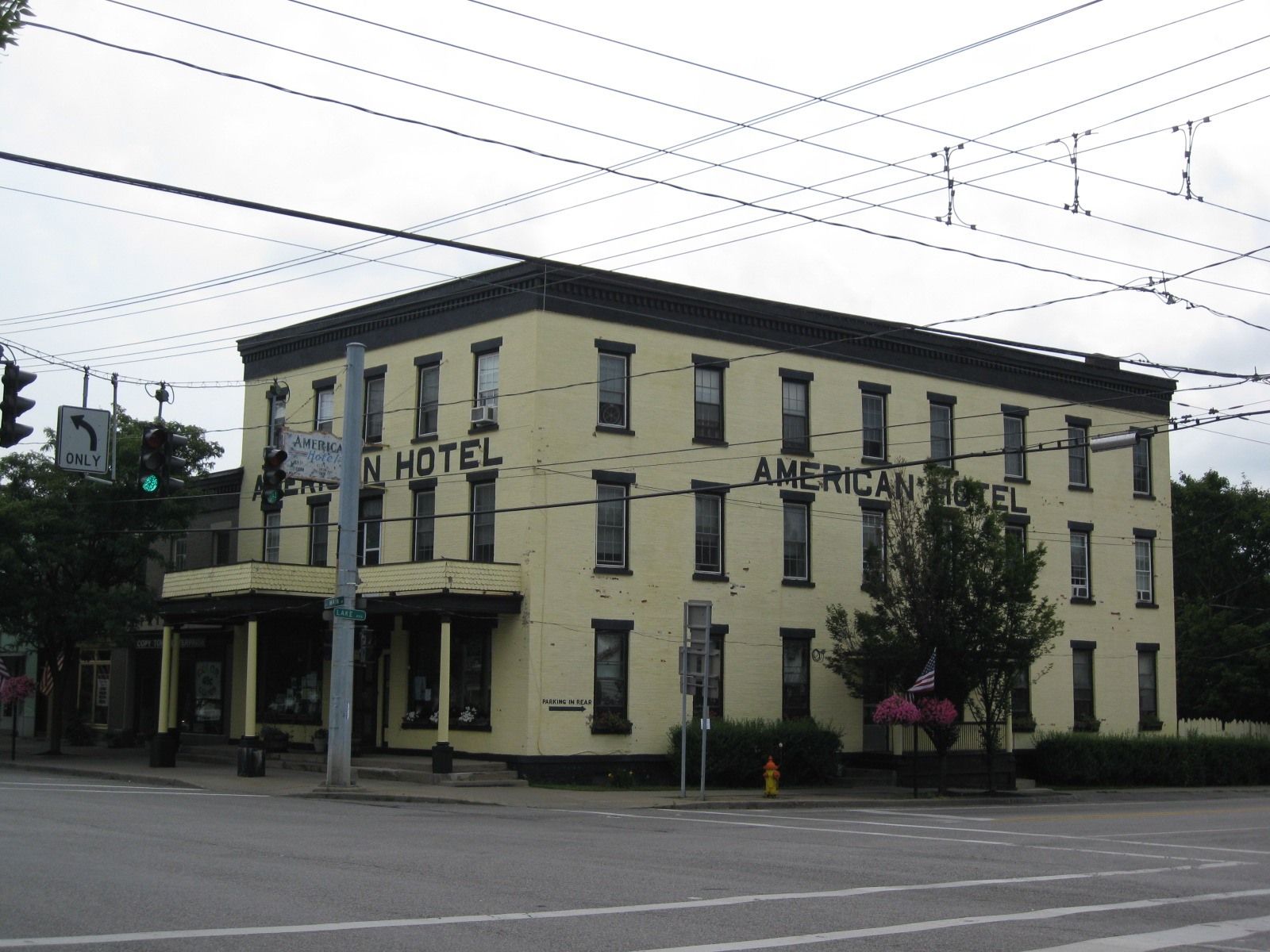
- American Hotel, August 2009

- Location within New York Location within the United States
- Location: 1881-1885 & 1818-1870 Rochester St., Lima Presbyterian Church, 7304-7312 & 7303-7315 E. Main St., Lima, New York
- Coordinates: 42°54′19″N 77°36′44″W
- Area: 8 acres (3.2 ha)
- Architectural style: Colonial Revival, Greek Revival, Late Victorian
- NRHP reference No.: 87002042
- Added to NRHP: November 20, 1987

Lima Village Historic District is a national historic district located at Lima in Livingston County, New York. The district encompasses 21 commercial, religious, civic, and residential properties in the historic core of the incorporated village of Lima and centered on the Four Corners business district. The buildings date from about 1845 to about 1923. Highlights of the district include significant examples of finely crafted Greek Revival and Italianate style commercial buildings with remarkably intact storefronts.

It was listed on the National Register of Historic Places in 1987.

Pictures of Lima Village Historic District
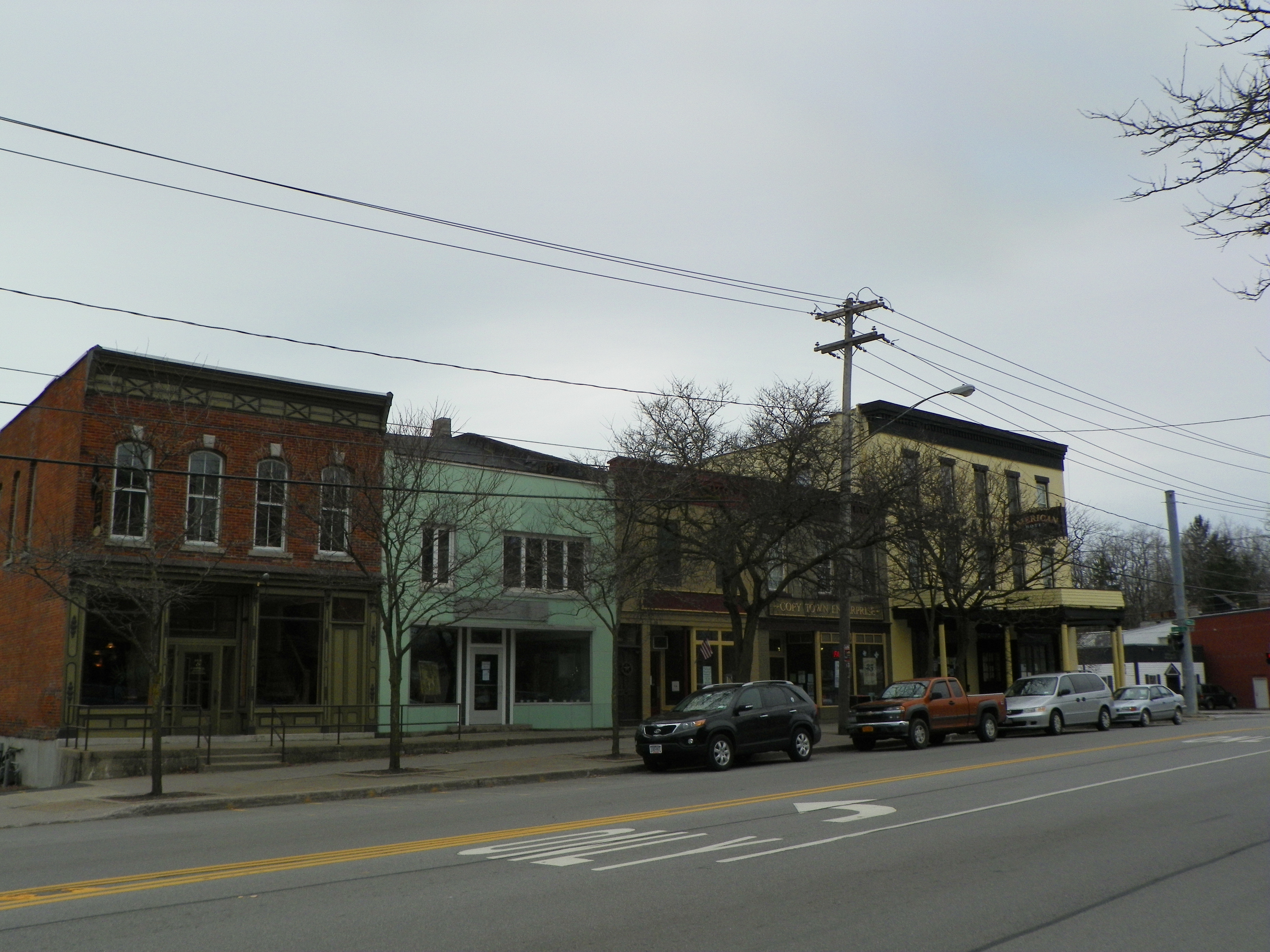
7304-7312 E. Main St., Lima, NY, including the American Hotel, far right.

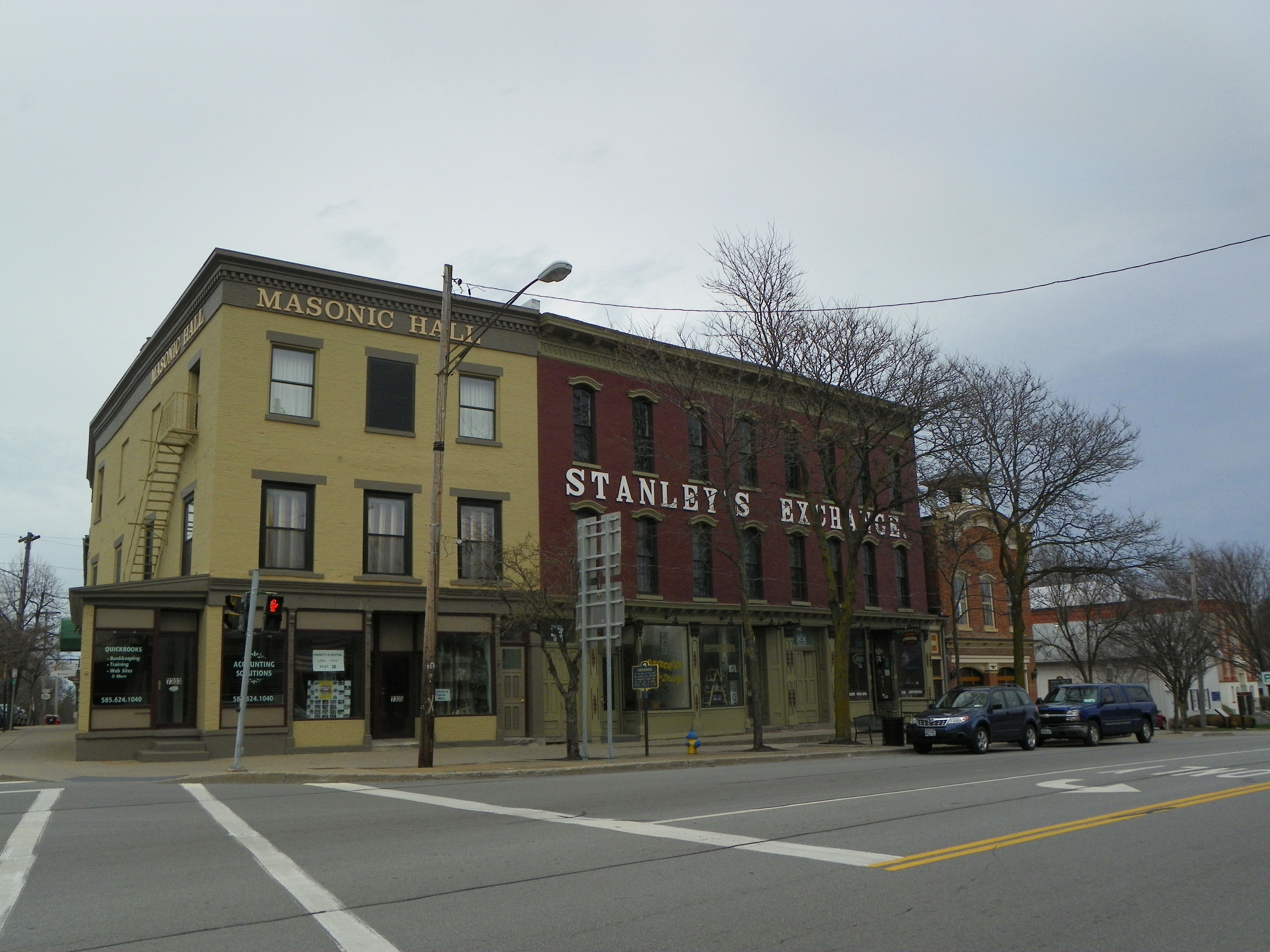
7303-7315 E. Main Street, Lima, NY, including the Masonic block on the left and the fire station, far right.

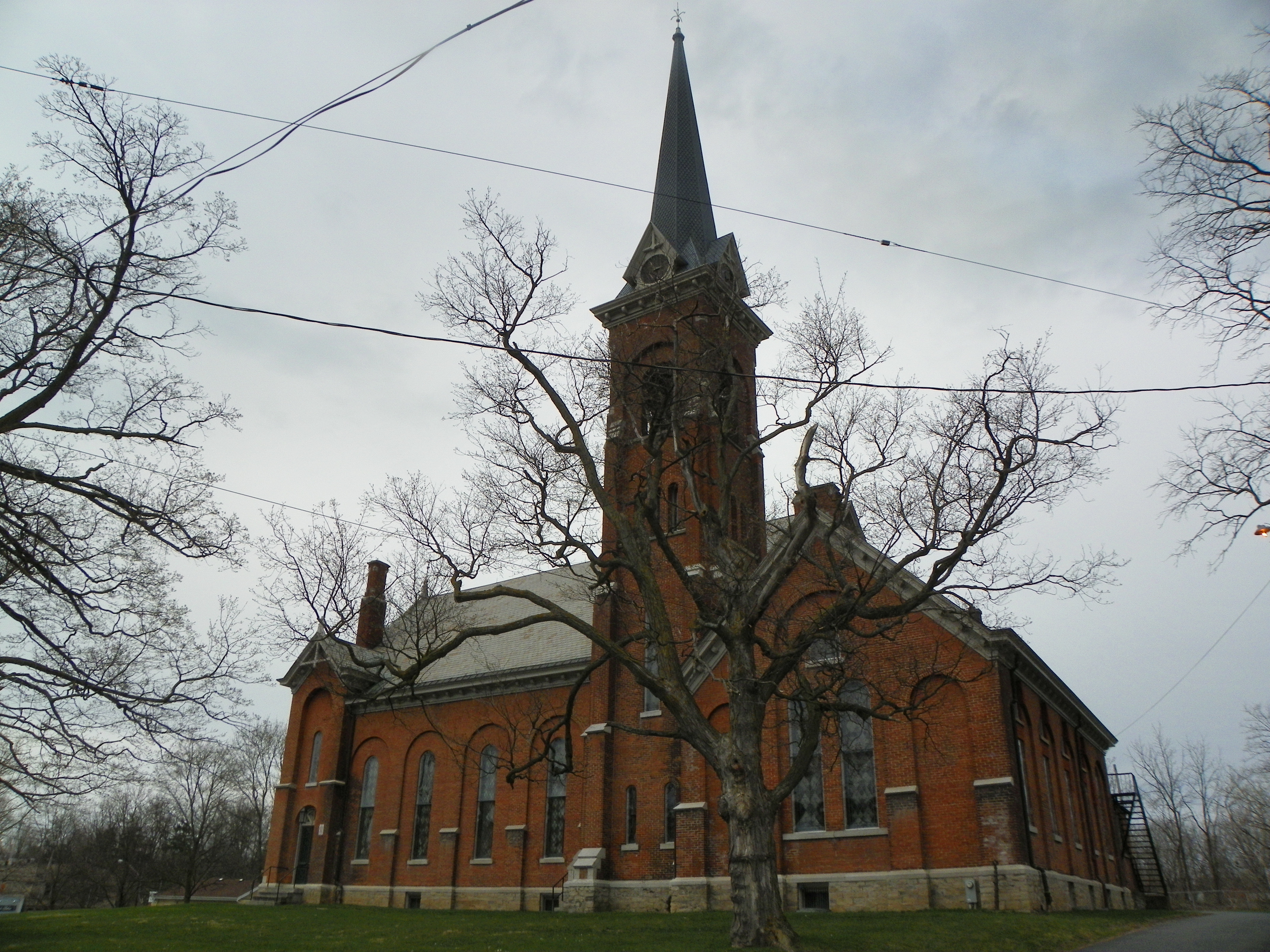
Lima Presbyterian Church (former Congregational Church), circa 1873.

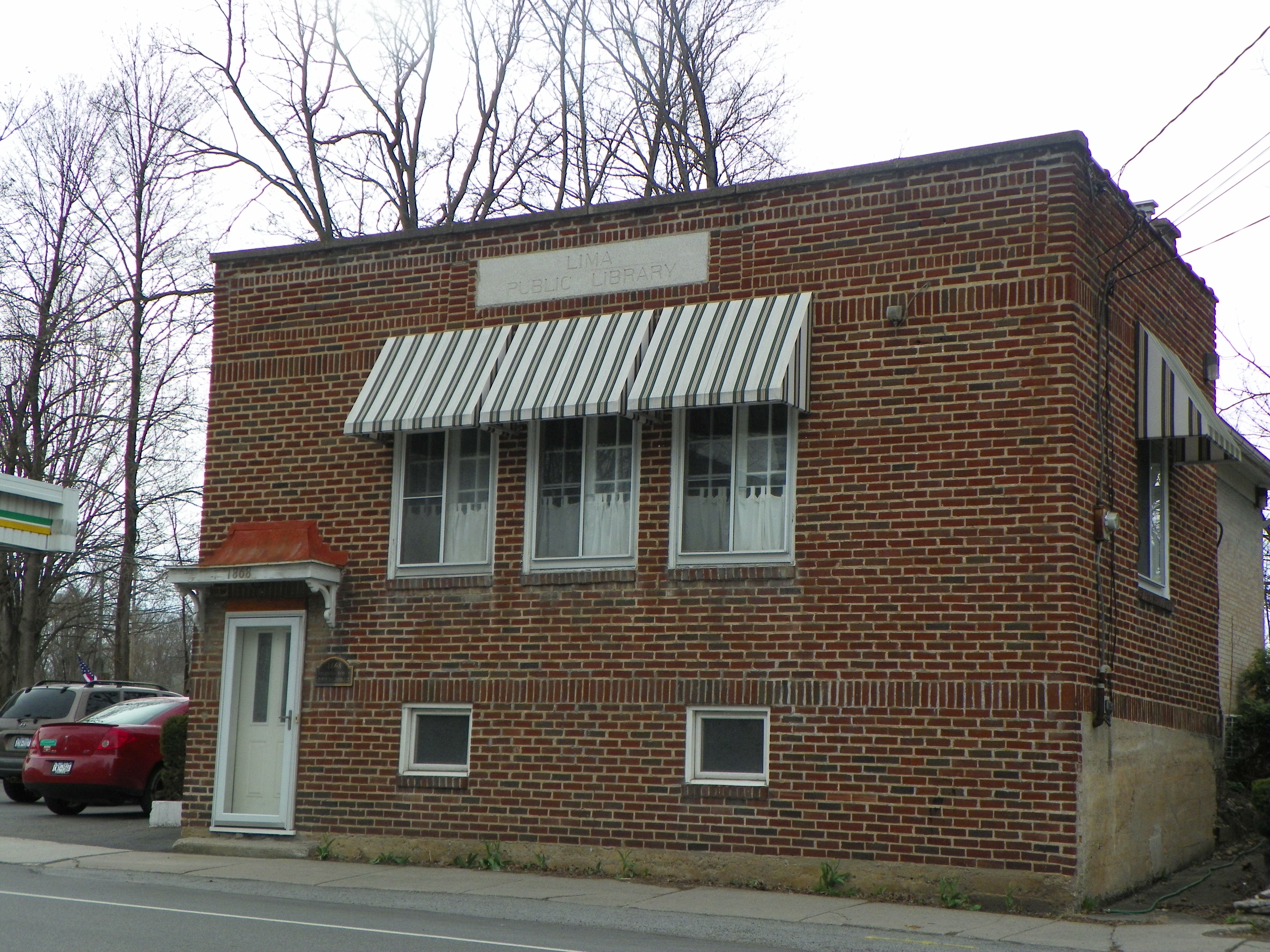
1868 Rochester St., former Lima Public Library, circa 1928.

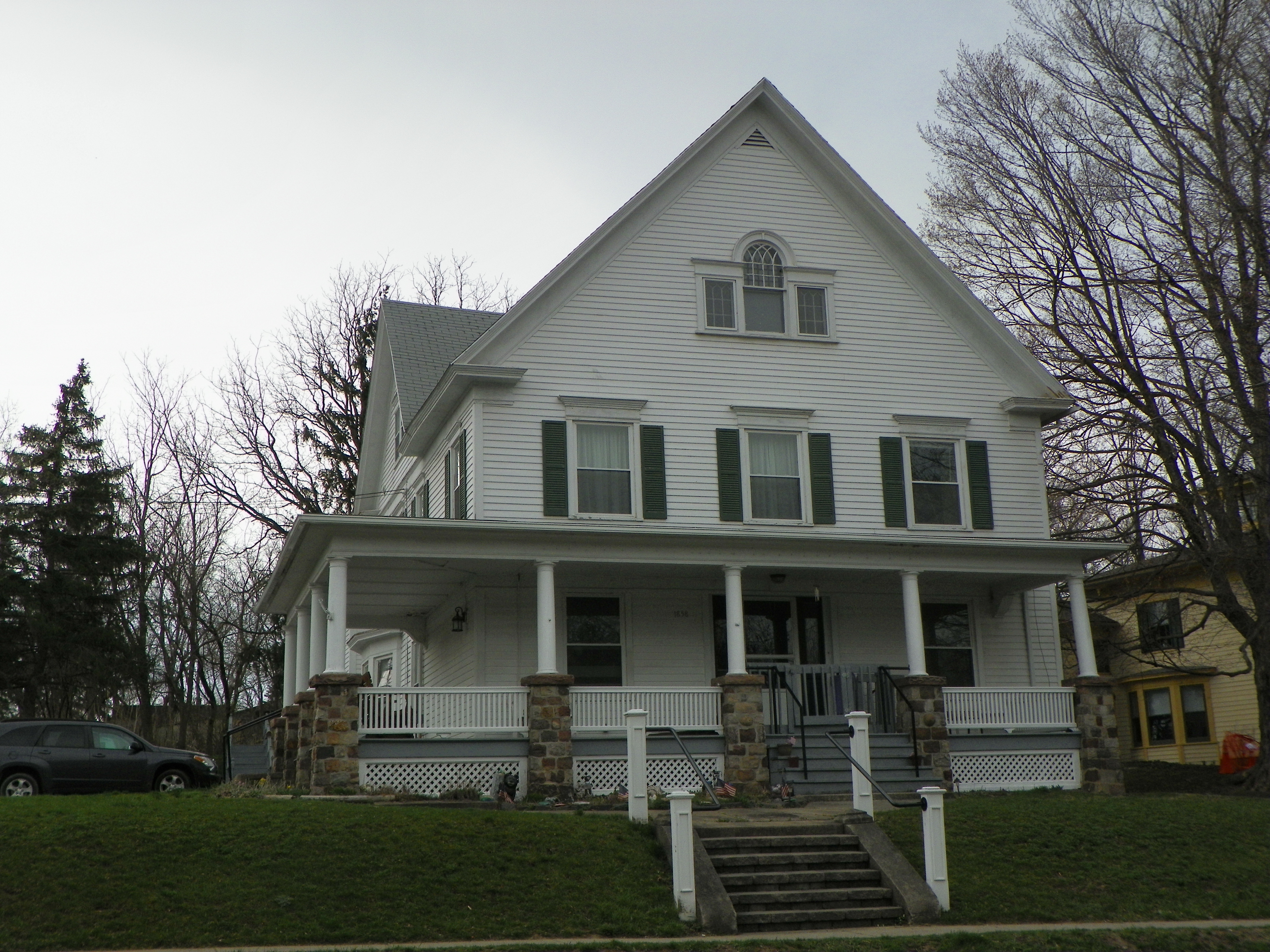
1858 Rochester St., the McKenzie House, circa 1900.

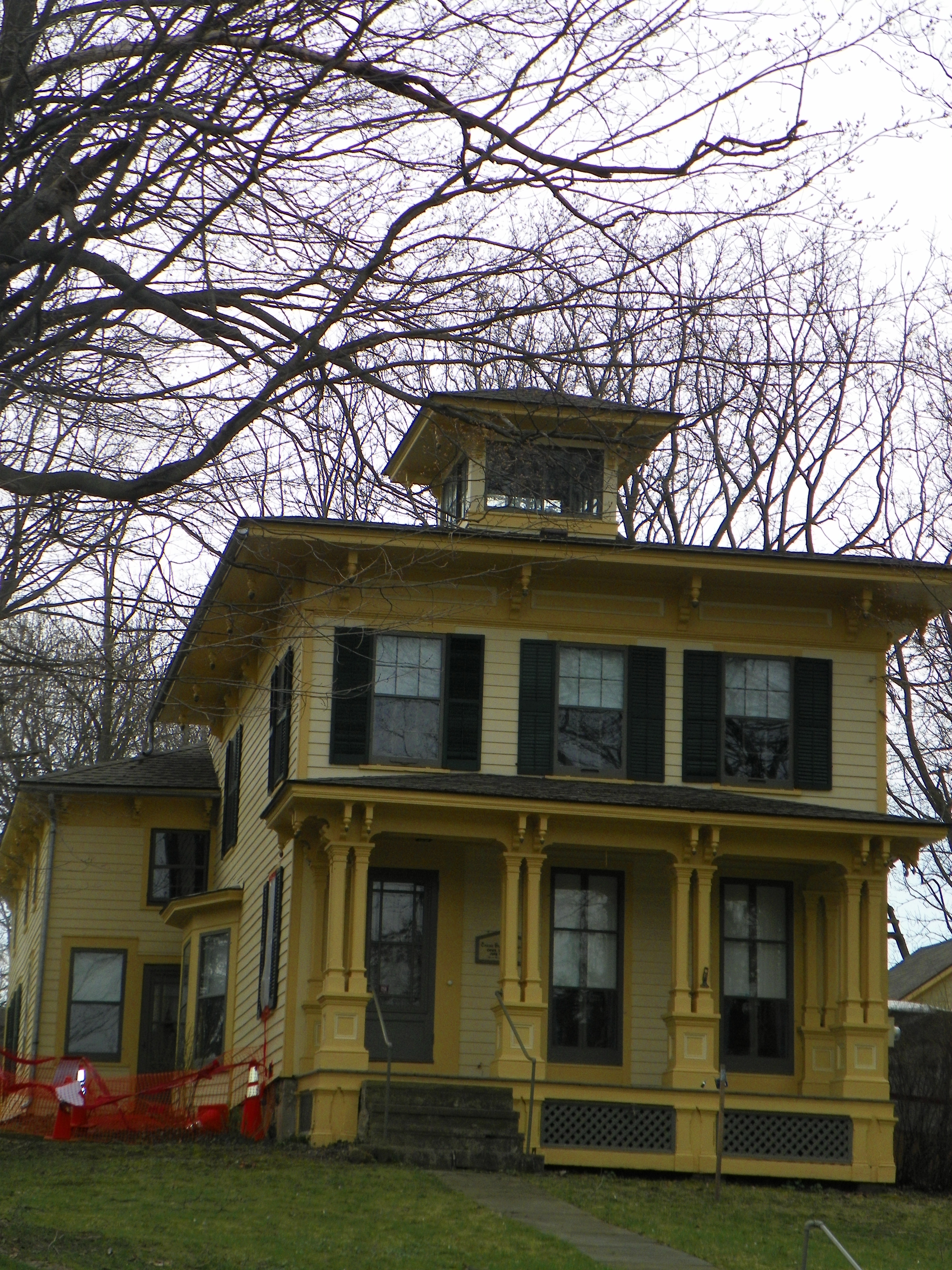
1850 Rochester St., currently the Tennie Burton Museum, formerly the Dr. Samuel Ellis House, 19th century.

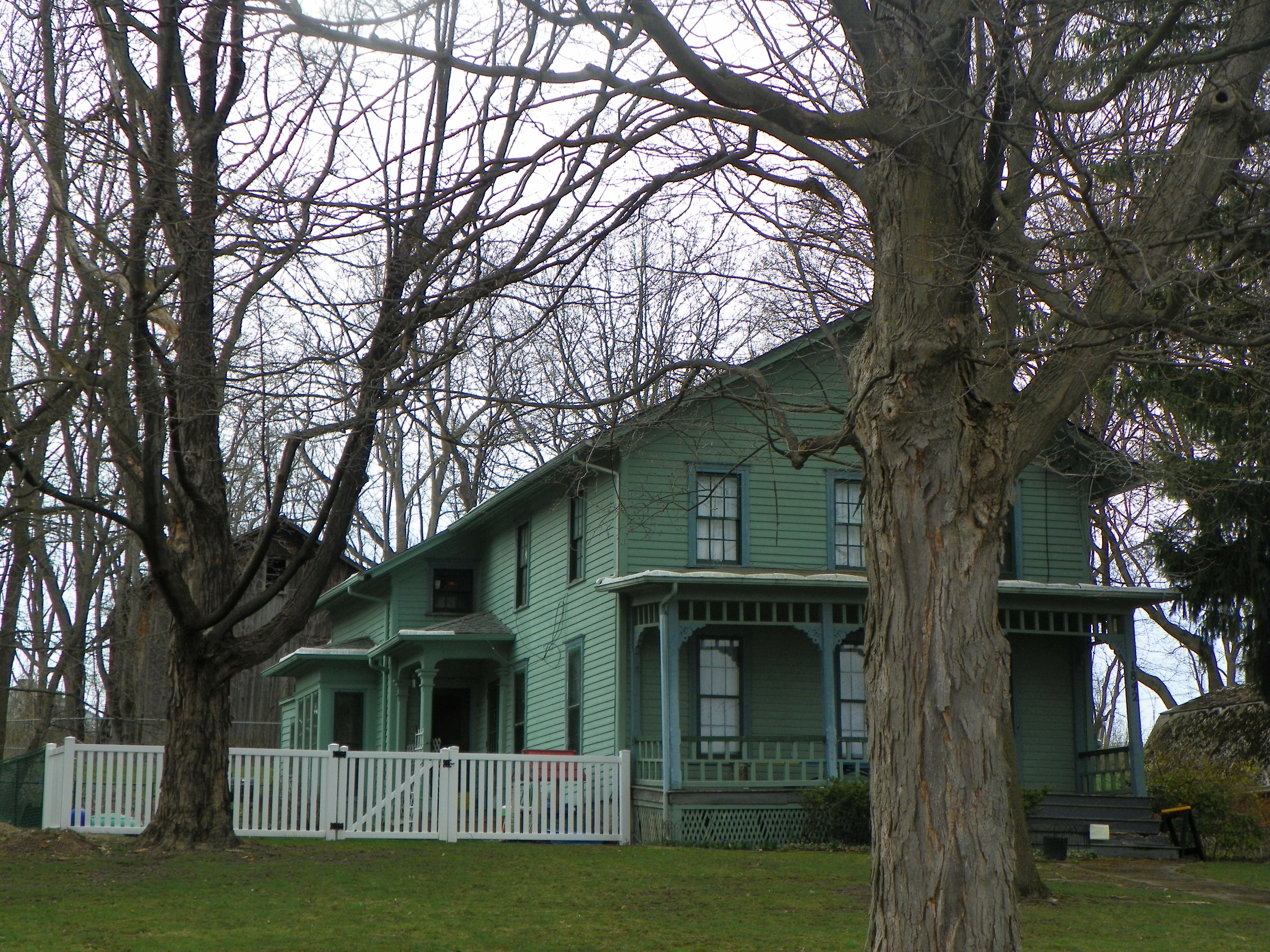
1842 Rochester St., Hoyt House.

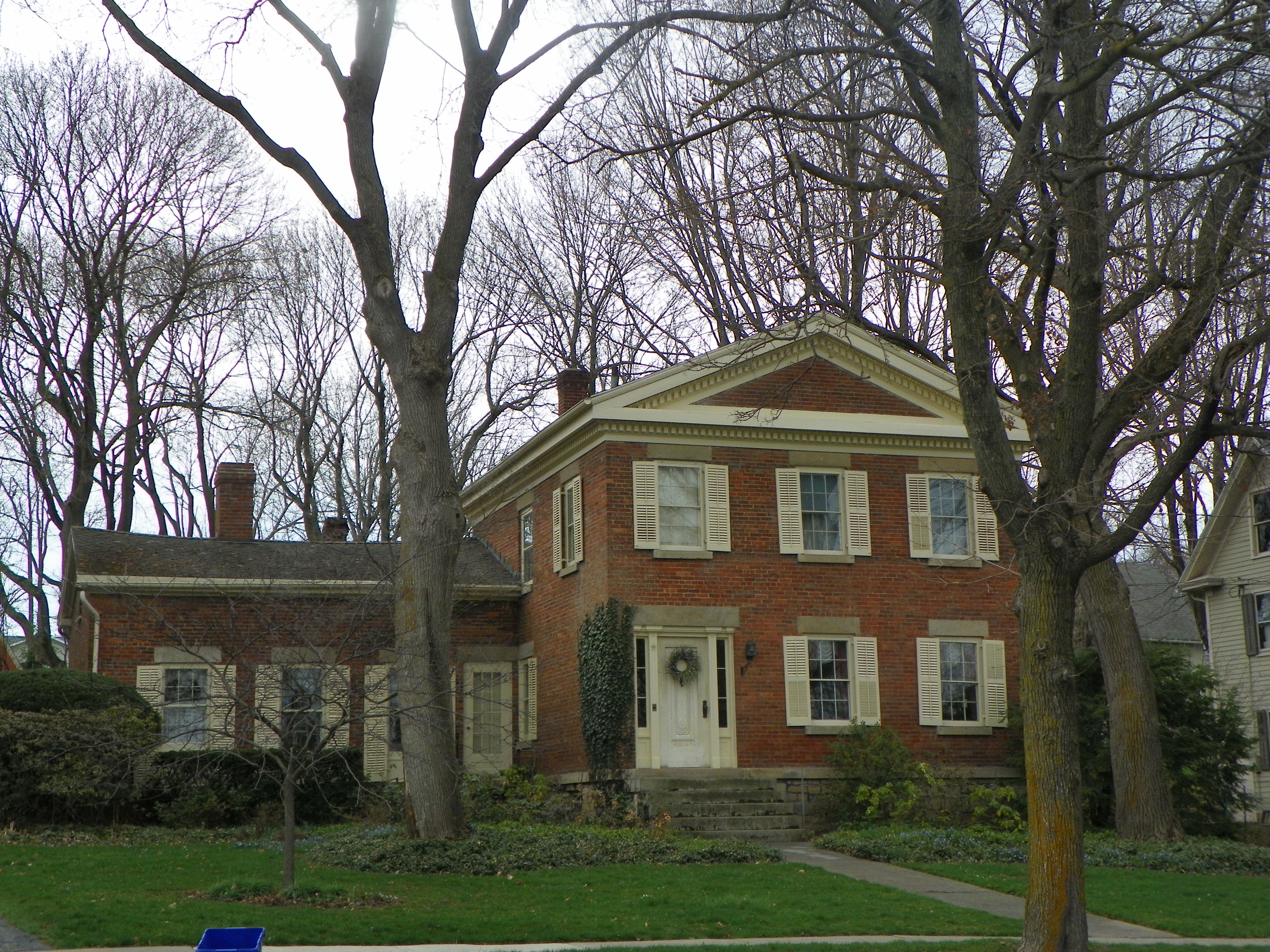
1836 Rochester St., Alverson House, circa 1845.

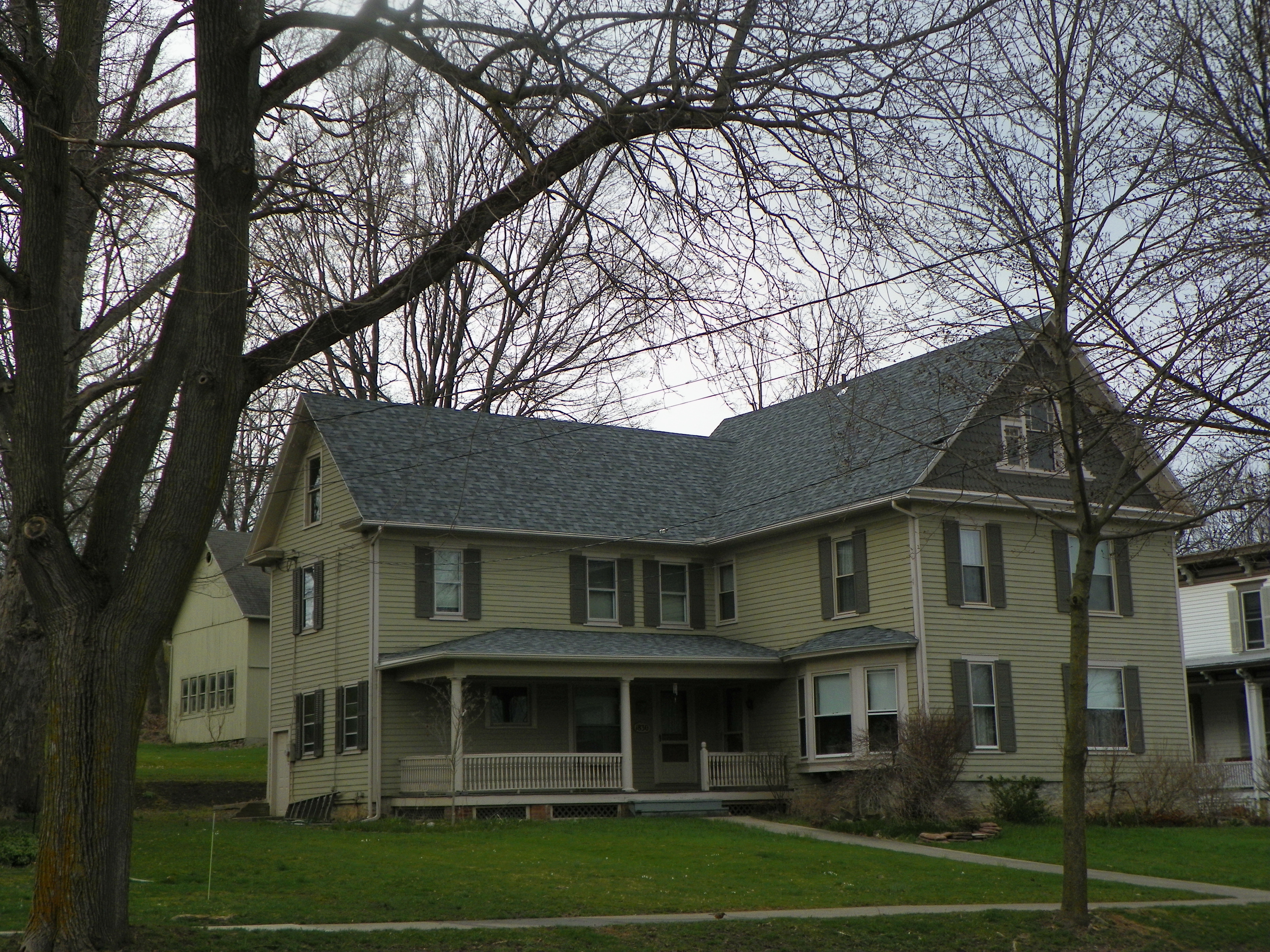
1830 Rochester St., the Chappell House, circa 1892.

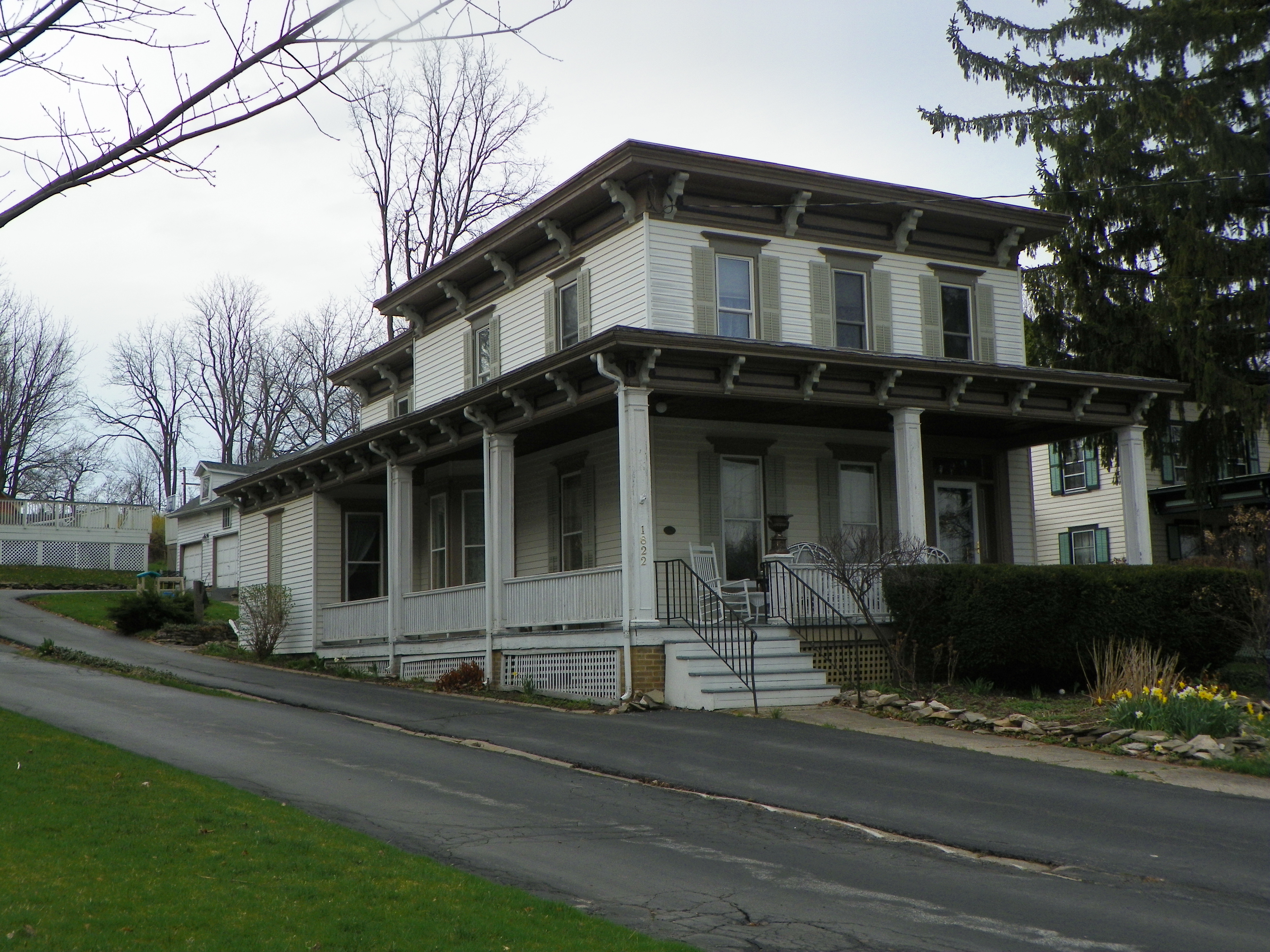
1822 Rochester St., the John Morley House, 19th century.

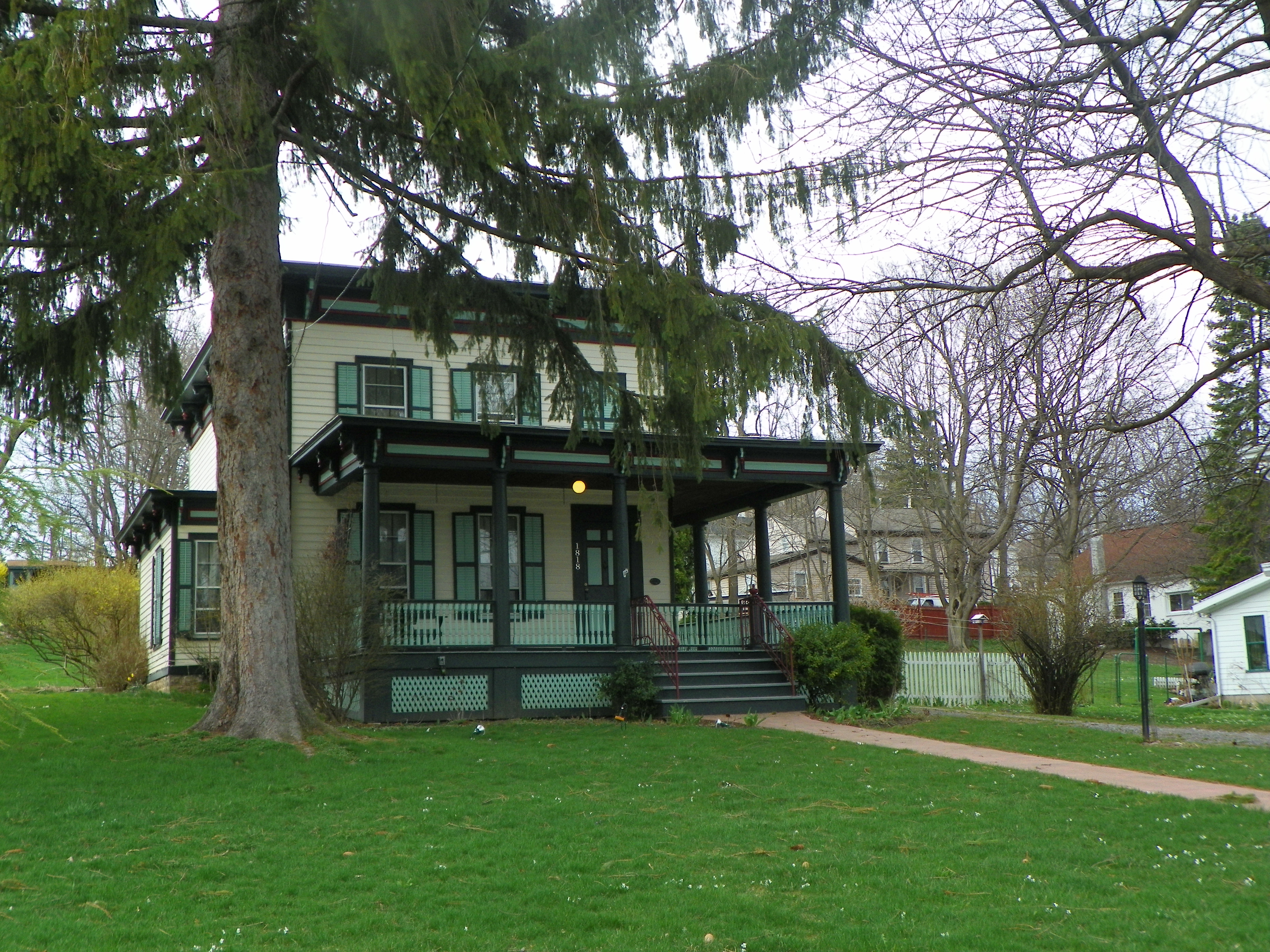
1818 Rochester St., Bennett-Keating House, 19th century.
