= South Carolina Highway 20 =

State highway in South Carolina

South Carolina Highway 20

Route information
- Maintained by SCDOT
- Length: 53.210 mi (85.633 km)
- Existed: 1922–present
- Tourist routes: South Carolina Heritage Corridor: Discovery Route

Major junctions
- West end: SC 203 in Abbeville
- US 76 / US 178 in Belton; I-185 Toll in Golden Grove; I-85 in Greenville; US 25 in Greenville; I-185 / US 29 in Greenville; US 29 in Greenville
- East end: McBee Avenue / River Street / Richardson Street in Greenville

Location
- Country: United States
- State: South Carolina
- Counties: Abbeville, Anderson, Greenville

Highway system
- South Carolina State Highway System; Interstate; US; State; Scenic
| ← I-20 | → US 21 |

South Carolina Highway 20 (SC 20) is a primary state highway in the U.S. state of South Carolina. The highway connects the cities of Abbeville, Belton, Williamston and Greenville. The 53-mile-long (85 km) highway is signed as a west-east highway though it physically runs south-to-north.

== Route description ==
SC 20 begins in the Abbeville Town Square at a junction with SC 203, which is signed for the town of Hodges. It is also immediately concurrent with the SC Heritage Corridor Discovery Route. As SC 20 leaves Abbeville, it meets SC 71, which goes to SC 81 in Lowdnesville. It meets SC 201 as well, which goes to Level Land. On the way to Due West, SC 20 becomes concurrent with SC 185. In Due West, the two routes meet SC 184 and have a brief concurrency before departing Due West. SC 185 finally splits from SC 20 as it heads to Belton. Right before entering Belton, it meets SC 252 via SC 20 Conn., and it meets SC 284 directly. In Belton, it meets US 76/US 178 and SC 247. SC 20 then continues north to Pelzer and Williamston, where it will meet US 29 Conn. and SC 8. It then heads toward Piedmont to SC 86. Shortly afterwards it meets I-85, I-185/US 29 and US 25 in the outskirts of Greenville. Finally, it makes a left turn then ends at US 29 and US 29 Alternate.

== History ==
Established in 1922 as an original state highway, it traversed from the Georgia state line to SC 8 (Guess Street/Green Avenue) in Greenville; connecting McCormick, Abbeville, Due West, Honea Path, Belton, and Williamston. Between 1924-1925, SC 20 was extended north, along Green Avenue, to SC 2/SC 8 (Pendleton Street), replacing a section of SC 8; this would be the longest distance SC 20 ever traveled, reaching over 107 miles (172 km) in length.

In 1935, SC 20 was truncated at U.S. Route 29 (US 29, Anderson Highway) in Williamston; its old alignment becoming US 29. In 1936, all of SC 20 was fully paved. Around 1937, SC 20 was truncated to its current western terminus in Abbeville, its alignment to the state line replaced by SC 28. In 1956, SC 20 was rerouted between Due West and Belton, replacing SC 257 and some of SC 284; its old alignment, through Honea Path, was replaced by SC 184 and US 178. Also same year, SC 20 was extended back along its old alignment north to a rerouted US 29, just south of Greenville. In 1962, SC 20 was extended into downtown Greenville, along Grove Avenue, ending at US 25 (Augusta Road), replacing US 29 Business (US 29 Bus.). In 2000, SC 20 was extended to its current northern terminus at Falls Park Drive (formerly Camperdown Way) just shy of US 123, replacing part of US 25 Bus.

== Major intersections ==
| County | Location | mi | km | Destinations | Notes |
|---|---|---|---|---|---|
| Abbeville | Abbeville | 0.000 | 0.000 | Washington Street east (SC 203 north) / Trinity Street west / North Main Street south | Western terminus of SC 20; southern terminus of SC 203; western terminus of Washington Street; eastern terminus of Trinity Street; North Main Street continues past terminus. |
| Abbeville | Abbeville | 0.180 | 0.290 | SC 71 west (Main Street) – Lowndesville | Eastern terminus of SC 71 |
| Abbeville | Abbeville | 1.800 | 2.897 | Hill Road west (SC 20 Conn. west) to SC 28 – Calhoun Falls, McCormick | Eastern terminus of SC 20 Conn.; provides access to Abbeville Area Medical Center |
| Abbeville | | 3.490 | 5.617 | SC 201 north – Level Land, Anderson | Southern terminus of SC 201 |
| Abbeville | | 9.510 | 15.305 | SC 185 south – Hodges | Western end of SC 185 concurrency |
| Abbeville | Due West | 11.970 | 19.264 | SC 184 east (Main Street) – Donalds, Honea Path | Western end of SC 184 concurrency |
| Abbeville | Due West | 12.340 | 19.859 | SC 184 west (Main Street) – Antreville | Eastern end of SC 184 concurrency |
| Abbeville | | 15.920 | 25.621 | SC 185 north – Anderson | Eastern end of SC 185 concurrency |
| Anderson | | 21.010 | 33.812 | SC 20 Conn. west (Clinkscales Road) – Honea Path | Eastern terminus of SC 20 Conn. |
| Anderson | | 21.390 | 34.424 | SC 284 south (Trail Road) – Antreville | Northern terminus of SC 284 |
| Anderson | Craytonville | 21.730 | 34.971 | SC 20 Conn. (Clinkscales Road) – Honea Path, Anderson | |
| Anderson | Belton | 28.020 | 45.094 | US 76 (Anderson Street) / US 178 west – Anderson | Western end of US 76/US 178 concurrency |
| Anderson | Belton | 28.090 | 45.206 | US 76 (Main Street) / US 178 east – Honea Path, Greenwood | Eastern end of US 76/US 178 concurreny |
| Anderson | Belton | 28.170 | 45.335 | SC 247 (River Street) – Ware Place | Southern terminus of SC 247 |
| Anderson | Williamston | 35.140 | 56.552 | US 29 Conn. south (Anderson Drive) to US 29 – Anderson | Northern terminus of US 29 Conn. |
| Anderson | Pelzer | 37.740 | 60.737 | SC 8 (Lebby Street / Main Street) – Pelzer, West Pelzer | |
| Greenville | Piedmont | 42.410 | 68.252 | SC 86 (Main Street) – Canterbury | |
| Greenville | Golden Grove | 45.190– 45.410 | 72.726– 73.080 | I-185 Toll – Columbia, Greenville, Atlanta | I-185 exit 10 |
| Greenville | Greenville | 48.920– 48.950 | 78.729– 78.777 | I-85 north – Spartanburg | Access to I-85 south via Lenhardt Road and/or White Horse Road |
| Greenville | Greenville | 49.550 | 79.743 | US 25 (White Horse Road) – Easley | |
| Greenville | Greenville | 50.019– 50.130 | 80.498– 80.676 | I-185 / US 29 north – Greenville | Access to I-185/US 29 south via White Horse Road |
| Greenville | Greenville | 52.290 | 84.153 | US 29 (Mills Avenue/Church Street) to I-185 / I-385 | |
| Greenville | Greenville | 53.210 | 85.633 | South Main Street / River Street north to SC 124 | Eastern terminus; roadway continues as River Street. |
1.000 mi = 1.609 km; 1.000 km = 0.621 mi: Concurrency terminus; Incomplete access

== Special routes ==
=== Abbeville truck route ===
South Carolina Highway 20 Truck
- Location: Abbeville
- Length: 5.350 mi (8.610 km)

South Carolina Highway 20 Truck (SC 20 Truck) is a 5.3-mile-long (8.5 km) truck route that has approximately half its path within the city limits of Abbeville. It has concurrencies with SC 71 Truck and SC 28.

It begins at an intersection with the southern terminus of SC 203 Truck (South Main Street) in the south-central part of Abbeville, which is in the southeastern part of Abbeville County. This is also the southern terminus of SC 71 Truck. SC 20 Truck and SC 71 Truck begin concurrent with SC 72. The three highways travel to the west-southwest. Immediately, they curve to the southwest and travel under a railroad bridge that carries some railroad tracks of CSX. They cross over Blue Hill Creek and curve to the south-southwest. They pass the Abbeville Area Medical Center and curve back to the southwest, before leaving the city limits of Abbeville. They pass Piedmont Technical College's Abbeville County Campus before intersecting SC 28. Here, the truck routes turn right, off of SC 72 and onto SC 28.

The three highways travel to the northwest and then pass Westwood Elementary School. They travel through rural areas of the county, passing a United States Department of Agriculture Service Center, the Pete Smith Sports Complex, and the Abbeville County Industrial Park. They cross over the aforementioned CSX rail line for a second time. They have an intersection with the eastern terminus of Old Calhoun Falls Road and the western terminus of Haigler Street, the former of which leads to the Abbeville County Law Enforcement Center, the Sheriff's and magistrates's offices, and detention center. They curve to the north-northeast and then intersect SC 71, where SC 71 Truck ends. SC 20 Truck and SC 28 curve to the northeast and intersect the northern terminus of SC 28 Conn. (North Main Street) and the western terminus of SC 20 Conn. (Hill Road). Here, SC 20 Truck ends, and SC 28 turns left, to the north-northwest.

The entire route is in Abbeville County.

| Location | mi | km | Destinations | Notes |
|---|---|---|---|---|
| Abbeville | 0.000 | 0.000 | SC 72 east (Greenwood Street) / SC 71 Truck begins – Greenwood; South Main Street south – Cedar Springs SC 203 Truck north (South Main Street north) to SC 20 – Due West, Anderson, Abbeville Business & Historic District | Southern end of SC 71 Truck and SC 72 concurrencies; southern terminus of SC 20 Truck, SC 72 Truck, and SC 203 Truck |
| | 1.960 | 3.154 | SC 28 east / SC 72 west – McCormick, Augusta, Calhoun Falls, Mount Carmel, Athens | Northern end of SC 72 concurrency; southern end of SC 28 concurrency |
| Abbeville | 4.870 | 7.838 | SC 71 / SC 71 Truck ends – Abbeville, Lowndesville | Northern end of SC 71 Truck concurrency |
| | 5.350 | 8.610 | SC 28 west – Anderson, Antreville North Main Street (SC 28 Conn. south) to SC 71; Hill Road east (SC 20 Conn. east) – Due West | Northern end of SC 28 concurrency; northern terminus of SC 20 Truck and SC 28 Conn.; western terminus of SC 20 Conn. |
1.000 mi = 1.609 km; 1.000 km = 0.621 mi: Concurrency terminus

=== Abbeville connector ===
South Carolina Highway 20 Connector
- Location: Abbeville, South Carolina
- Length: 0.870 mi (1,400 m)

South Carolina Highway 20 Connector (SC 20 Conn.) is a 0.870 miles (1.400 km) connector route, partially in the northwestern part of Abbeville. It connects SC 28 and SC 28 Conn. with SC 20. The highway is unsigned for its entire length.

The entire route is in Abbeville County.

| Location | mi | km | Destinations | Notes |
|---|---|---|---|---|
| | 0.000 | 0.000 | North Main Street south (SC 28 Conn. south) to SC 71 – Burt-Stark Mansion SC 20 Truck south / SC 28 east – McCormick, Abbeville County Law Enforcement Center, Sheriff's and magistrates's offices, Detention center SC 28 west – Anderson, Antreville | Western terminus of SC 20 Conn.; northern terminus of SC 20 Truck and SC 28 Conn. |
| | 0.870 | 1.400 | SC 20 – Due West, Abbeville, Abbeville High School | Eastern terminus |
1.000 mi = 1.609 km; 1.000 km = 0.621 mi

=== Craytonville connector ===
South Carolina Highway 20 Connector
- Location: Craytonville, South Carolina
- Length: 1.090 mi (1.754 km)

South Carolina Highway 20 Connector (SC 20 Conn) is a 1.090 miles (1.754 km) connector route and is also known as Clinkscales Road. It connects SC 20 with SC 252 in Craytonville as the SC 20 mainline crosses over SC 252 on an overpass without a direct interchange. The connector route is signed.

== See also ==
- SC National Heritage Corridor | Belton Alliance
