= South Carolina Highway 71 =

State highway in South Carolina, United States

South Carolina Highway 71

Route information
- Maintained by SCDOT
- Length: 14.980 mi (24.108 km)
- Tourist routes: South Carolina Heritage Corridor: Discovery Route

Major junctions
- South end: SC 20 in Abbeville
- SC 28 in Abbeville; SC 284 near Lowndesville
- North end: SC 81 east of Lowndesville

Location
- Country: United States
- State: South Carolina
- Counties: Abbeville

Highway system
- South Carolina State Highway System; Interstate; US; State; Scenic
← SC 70	→ SC 72

South Carolina Highway 71 (SC 71) is a 14.980-mile-long (24.108 km) state highway in the northwestern part of the U.S. state of South Carolina. The highway travels in a west-to-east orientation, however it is designated and signed as a north–south highway. Its southern terminus is at SC 20 in Abbeville, and its northern terminus is at SC 81 east of Lowndesville, completely within Abbeville County.

== Route description ==
SC 71 begins at an intersection with SC 20 (known as Greenville Street north of here and also known as North Main Street south of here) in the central part of Abbeville and within the southeastern part of Abbeville County. This intersection is adjacent to the Burt-Stark Mansion. The highway travels to the northwest on North Main Street. It begins a curve to the west-southwest before intersecting the southern terminus of SC 28 Conn., which takes on the North Main Street name. After passing J.S. Wright Middle School, it intersects SC 20 Truck/SC 28. After this point, the highway leaves the city limits of Abbeville and begins to travel through rural areas of the county. It crosses over Redd Creek and then curves to the northwest. After curving to the west-northwest, it crosses over Calhoun Creek. SC 71 curves back to the northwest and crosses over the Little River. The highway then crosses over Penny Creek. It curves back to the west-southwest and crosses over Shanklin Creek. It winds its way to the west and intersects SC 284. It bends to the west-southwest and crosses over Gill Creek before reaching its northern terminus, an intersection with SC 81 just east of Lowndesville.

== Major intersections ==
The entire route is in Abbeville County.

Location	mi	km	Destinations	Notes
Abbeville	0.000	0.000	SC 20 east (North Main Street south) – Due West	Access to SC 20 west (Greenville Street north) is via Ellis Street just north of the terminus; SC 20 east and SC 71 share the North Main Street name; southern terminus.
Abbeville	1.240	1.996	SC 28 Conn. north (North Main Street north) to SC 28 – Antreville, Anderson	Southern terminus of SC 28 Conn., which takes on the North Main Street name
Abbeville	1.600	2.575	SC 28 (SC 20 Truck / SC 71 Truck south) – McCormick, Anderson, Calhoun Falls	Northern terminus of SC 71 Truck
	12.720	20.471	SC 284 – Calhoun Falls, Antreville	
	14.980	24.108	SC 81 – Calhoun Falls, Iva	Northern terminus
1.000 mi = 1.609 km; 1.000 km = 0.621 mi: Incomplete access

== Abbeville truck route ==
South Carolina Highway 71 Truck
- Location: Abbeville
- Length: 4.870 mi (7.838 km)

South Carolina Highway 71 Truck (SC 71 Truck) is a 4.870-mile-long (7.838 km) truck route that has approximately half its path outside the city limits of Abbeville. It has concurrencies with SC 20 Truck and SC 28.

It begins at an intersection with the southern terminus of SC 203 Truck (South Main Street) in the south-central part of Abbeville, which is in the southeastern part of Abbeville County. This is also the southern terminus of SC 20 Truck. SC 20 Truck and SC 71 Truck begin concurrent with SC 72. The three highways travel to the west-southwest. Immediately, they curve to the southwest and travel under a railroad bridge that carries some railroad tracks of CSX. They cross over Blue Hill Creek and curve to the south-southwest. They pass the Abbeville Area Medical Center and curve back to the southwest, before leaving the city limits of Abbeville. They pass Piedmont Technical College's Abbeville County Campus before intersecting SC 28. Here, the truck routes turn right, off of SC 72 and onto SC 28.

The three highways travel to the northwest and then pass Westwood Elementary School. They travel through rural areas of the county, passing a United States Department of Agriculture Service Center, the Pete Smith Sports Complex, and the Abbeville County Industrial Park. They cross over the aforementioned CSX rail line for a second time. They have an intersection with the eastern terminus of Old Calhoun Falls Road and the western terminus of Haigler Street, the former of which leads to the Abbeville County Law Enforcement Center, the Sheriff's and magistrates's offices, and detention center. They curve to the north-northeast and then intersect SC 71, where SC 71 Truck ends and SC 20 Truck and SC 28 continue to the north-northwest.

The entire route is in Abbeville County.

Location	mi	km	Destinations	Notes
Abbeville	0.000	0.000	SC 72 east (Greenwood Street) / SC 20 Truck begins – Greenwood; South Main Street south – Cedar Springs SC 203 Truck north (South Main Street north) to SC 20 – Due West, Anderson, Abbeville Business & Historic District	Southern end of SC 20 Truck and SC 72 concurrencies; southern terminus of SC 20 Truck, SC 72 Truck, and SC 203 Truck
	1.960	3.154	SC 28 east / SC 72 west – McCormick, Augusta, Calhoun Falls, Mount Carmel, Athens	Northern end of SC 72 concurrency; southern end of SC 28 concurrency
Abbeville	4.870	7.838	SC 28 west (SC 20 Truck north) / SC 71 – Anderson, Abbeville, Lowndesville	Northern end of SC 20 Truck and SC 28 concurrencies; northern terminus
1.000 mi = 1.609 km; 1.000 km = 0.621 mi: Concurrency terminus
