= South Carolina Highway 184 =

Highway in South Carolina

South Carolina Highway 184

Route information
- Maintained by SCDOT
- Length: 34.610 mi (55.699 km)

Major junctions
- West end: SR 368 at the Georgia state line near Iva
- US 178 in Donalds
- East end: SC 252 near Ware Shoals

Location
- Country: United States
- State: South Carolina
- Counties: Anderson, Abbeville

Highway system
- South Carolina State Highway System; Interstate; US; State; Scenic
← SC 183	→ I-185

South Carolina Highway 184 (SC 184) is a 34.610-mile-long (55.699 km) state highway in the U.S. state of South Carolina. The highway connects the Georgia state line and the Ware Shoals area, via Antreville, Due West, and Donalds.

== Route description ==
SC 184 begins at the Georgia state line, where the roadway crosses over the Savannah River and enters that state on the Sgt. Fred M. Newton Bridge as Georgia State Route 368 (Anderson Highway). It begins to travel through Anderson in an east-northeast direction and then curves to the north-northwest before an intersection with SC 187. It curves to the northeast and crosses over Little Generostee Creek before entering Iva. The highway turns right onto Hamilton Street. It has a concurrency with SC 81. At East Green Street, it meets the southern terminus of SC 413. The two highways travel concurrently to the southeast for one block, where SC 413 splits off onto East Front Street. SC 184 then travels to the northeast, leaves Iva, and crosses East Beards Creek. It starts heading east, and crosses over Lake Secession, into Abbeville County, on an unnamed bridge. It then travels through part of Lake Secession and curves to the southeast before entering Antreville. There, it begins a concurrency with SC 28/SC 284. Right after leaving the city limits, SC 284 leaves the concurrency. Approximately 2,000 feet (610 m) later, SC 184 splits off to the northeast and crosses over Spur Creek. It winds its way through rural areas of the county and crosses over Johnson Creek. A short distance later is an intersection with SC 201 and a crossing of the Little River. SC 184 crosses over Hogskin Creek and Chickasaw Creek before entering Due West. In town, it begins a concurrency with SC 20/SC 185 (Anderson Drive). The three highways pass by Erskine Theological Seminary and Erskine College. At College Street, SC 20/SC 185 splits off, while SC 184 continues to the northeast. In Donalds, it has a very brief concurrency with U.S. Route 178 (US 178). Farther to the northeast, it crosses over Turkey Creek before it meets its eastern terminus, an intersection with SC 252.

== Major intersections ==
County	Location	mi	km	Destinations	Notes
Anderson		0.000	0.000	SR 368 south (Sgt. Fred M. Newton Bridge/Anderson Highway) – Elberton	Continuation beyond Georgia state line
Anderson		1.340	2.157	SC 187 north – Starr	Southern terminus of SC 187
Anderson	Iva	6.360	10.235	SC 81 south (Lowndensville Highway) – Lowndensville	Western end of SC 81 concurrency
Anderson	Iva	6.780	10.911	SC 81 north (West Front Street) / SC 413 begins (East Green Street) – Anderson	Eastern end of SC 81 concurrency; western end of SC 413 concurrency; southern terminus of SC 413
Anderson	Iva	6.820	10.976	SC 413 north (East Front Street)	Eastern end of SC 413 concurrency
Abbeville	Antreville	14.370	23.126	SC 28 west / SC 284 north – Anderson	Western end of SC 28 and SC 284 concurrencies
Abbeville		14.980	24.108	SC 284 south – Lowndesville	Eastern end of SC 284 concurrency
Abbeville		15.360	24.720	SC 28 east – Abbeville	Eastern end of SC 28 concurrency
Abbeville		20.720	33.346	SC 201 – Abbeville	
Abbeville	Due West	24.870	40.024	SC 20 north / SC 185 north (Anderson Drive) – Belton, Anderson	Western end of SC 20/SC 185 concurrency
Abbeville	Due West	25.240	40.620	SC 20 south (College Street) / SC 185 south	Eastern end of SC 20/SC 185 concurrency
Abbeville	Donalds	29.200	46.993	US 178 east (South Main Street) – Hodges, Greenwood	Western end of US 178 concurrency
Abbeville	Donalds	29.250	47.073	US 178 west (North Main Street)	Eastern end of US 178 concurrency
Abbeville		34.610	55.699	SC 252 – Ware Shoals, Honea Path	Eastern terminus
1.000 mi = 1.609 km; 1.000 km = 0.621 mi: Concurrency terminus
