= South Carolina Highway 252 =

State highway in South Carolina

South Carolina Highway 252

Route information
- Maintained by SCDOT
- Length: 35.711 mi (57.471 km)
- Tourist routes: South Carolina Heritage Corridor: Discovery Route

Major junctions
- West end: US 76 / US 178 near Anderson
- US 76 / US 178 in Honea Path; US 25 Bus. in Ware Shoals; US 25 / US 25 Bus. near Ware Shoals
- East end: US 76 near Laurens

Location
- Country: United States
- State: South Carolina
- Counties: Anderson, Abbeville, Greenwood, Laurens

Highway system
- South Carolina State Highway System; Interstate; US; State; Scenic
← SC 248	→ SC 253

South Carolina Highway 252 (SC 252) is a 35.711-mile-long (57.471 km) state highway in the U.S. state of South Carolina. The highway connects the Anderson and Laurens areas with Honea Path and Ware Shoals. It has a unique feature in that it intersects U.S. Route 76 (US 76) three times along its length.

== Route description ==
SC 252 begins at a partial interchange with US 76/US 178 (Belton Highway) southeast of Anderson, and south of Meadow Brook, within Anderson County. It travels to the east-southeast and crosses Neals Creek before an intersection with SC 413. The highway begins curving to the southeast and crosses over Hencoop Creek before entering Craytonville. There, it intersects SC 20 Connector (SC 20 Conn.; Clinkscales Road), which connects SC 252 with SC 20 (Trail Road), since they do not intersect. A short distance later, SC 252 travels under a bridge that carries SC 20. On the southeast side of Craytonville, it has another intersection with SC 252 Conn. The highway traveled to the east and crosses Barkers Creek. Then, the highway starts traveling to the east-northeast and crosses Blue Barker Creek, just before entering Honea Path.

Through town, it travels just south of Honea Path Middle School before it has a second intersection with US 76/US 178 (North Main Street). The three highway travel concurrently to the east. One block later, US 178 splits off to the right, onto Church Street. US 76/SC 252 continue to the east. They split northwest of Honea Path Elementary School. Just after leaving town, SC 252 enters Abbeville County and travels through Broadmouth. It intersects the eastern terminus of SC 184 just before entering Ware Shoals. Between Summit Drive and Edgewood Drive, the highway enters Greenwood County. At East Fleming Street, SC 252 turns left, while SC 252 Truck continues along North Greenwood Avenue. About one block later, it intersects US 25 Business (US 25 Bus.), onto which SC 252 turns left. The two highways travel concurrently to the north-northwest. Just before leaving town, they curve to the northeast. They cross over the Saluda River on the Senator William H. "Billy" O'Dell Bridge, which marks the Laurens County line. They curve to a due north direction and curve to the east-northeast and meet US 25 at an interchange. Here, US 25 Bus. ends, while SC 252 continues to the east-northeast. It curves to the northeast and crosses Walnut Creek. The highway travels through Poplar Springs. Then, it crosses over the Reedy River and Rabon Creek. A short distance later, it meets its eastern terminus, an intersection with US 76 (West Main Street).

== Major intersections ==
County	Location	mi	km	Destinations	Notes
Anderson		0.000	0.000	US 76 (Belton Highway) / US 178	Partial interchange; no access from SC 252 to US 76/US 178 east or from US 76/US 178 west to SC 252
Anderson		2.340	3.766	SC 413 – Iva, Belton	
Anderson	Craytonville	5.910	9.511	SC 20 Conn. east (Clinkscales Road) to SC 284 – Antreville, Belton	Western terminus of SC 20 Conn.; also leads to SC 20
Anderson	Craytonville	6.690	10.767	SC 20 Conn. (Clinkscales Road) – Belton, Due West	
Anderson	Honea Path	12.040	19.377	US 76 west / US 178 west (North Main Street)	Western end of US 76 and US 178 concurrencies
Anderson	Honea Path			US 178 east (Church Street) – Due West, Greenwood	Eastern end of US 178 concurrency
Anderson	Honea Path	12.620	20.310	US 76 east – Princeton, Laurens	Eastern end of US 76 concurrency
Abbeville		19.390	31.205	SC 184 west	Eastern terminus of SC 184
Greenwood	Ware Shoals	21.812	35.103	SC 252 Truck east (North Greenwood Avenue north)	Western terminus of SC 252 Truck, which takes on the North Greenwood Avenue name; SC 252 turns left onto East Fleming Street.
Greenwood	Ware Shoals	21.921	35.278	US 25 Bus. south	Western end of US 25 Bus. concurrency
Laurens		23.951	38.545	US 25 / US 25 Bus. ends – Greenwood, Greenville	Interchange; eastern end of US 25 Bus. concurrency
Laurens		35.711	57.471	US 76 (West Main Street)	
1.000 mi = 1.609 km; 1.000 km = 0.621 mi: Concurrency terminus; Incomplete access

== Special routes ==
=== Ware Shoals business loop ===
North Greenwood Avenue
- Location: Ware Shoals, South Carolina

South Carolina Highway 252 Business (SC 252 Bus.) is a business route of SC 252 that is actually the mainline route signed as a business route. It is entirely within Ware Shoals, within Greenwood County.

=== Ware Shoals truck route ===
South Carolina Highway 252 Truck
- Location: Ware Shoals, South Carolina
- Length: 6.868 mi (11.053 km)

South Carolina Highway 252 Truck (SC 252 Truck) is a 6.868-mile (11.053 km) truck route of SC 252 that has its routing within Ware Shoals, within Greenwood County. About half of it is also in Laurens County.

SC 252 Truck begins at an intersection with the SC 252 mainline (North Greenwood Avenue/East Fleming Street). It travels to the southeast on North Greenwood Avenue. In downtown Ware Shoals it has a five-way intersection with U.S. Route 25 Bus. and Main Street. US 25 Bus. and SC 252 Truck travel concurrently on South Greenwood Avenue. They pass Ware Shoals High School and the Ware Shoals Golf Course. Just southeast of the city limits, they intersect US 25. Here, US 25 Bus. ends, and SC 252 Truck turns left onto US 25 north. US 25/SC 252 Truck enters Ware Shoals at Burnt Bridge Road. They cross over the Saluda River on the William T. Jones III Bridge. Here, they leave Ware Shoals and Greenwood County and enter Laurens County. They have an interchange with Power House Road. The concurrency curves to the north-northwest and reach an interchange with the northern terminus of US 25 Bus. and SC 252 Here, SC 252 Truck ends.

County	Location	mi	km	Destinations	Notes
Greenwood	Ware Shoals	0.000	0.000	SC 252 (North Greenwood Avenue north / East Fleming Street) – Honea Path, Greenville	Southern terminus; SC 252 and SC 252 Truck share the North Greenwood Avenue name.
Greenwood	Ware Shoals	0.208	0.335	US 25 Bus. north – Greenville	Western end of US 25 Bus. concurrency
Greenwood	Ware Shoals	1.268	2.041	SC 420 west (Smith Street) / Honea Path Street north – Shoals Junction	Eastern terminus of SC 420; northern terminus of Smith Street; southern terminus of Honea Path Street
Greenwood		3.148– 3.198	5.066– 5.147	US 25 south / US 25 Bus. ends – Greenwood	Eastern end of US 25 Bus. concurrency; western end of US 25 concurrency; eastern terminus of US 25 Bus.
Laurens		4.868	7.834	Power House Road	Interchange
Laurens		6.868	11.053	US 25 / US 25 Bus. / SC 252	Eastern terminus; interchange
1.000 mi = 1.609 km; 1.000 km = 0.621 mi: Concurrency terminus
