= South Carolina Highway 203 =

State highway in South Carolina, United States

South Carolina Highway 203

Route information
- Maintained by SCDOT
- Length: 7.750 mi (12.472 km)

Major junctions
- South end: SC 20 in Abbeville
- North end: SC 185 near Arborville

Location
- Country: United States
- State: South Carolina
- Counties: Abbeville

Highway system
- South Carolina State Highway System; Interstate; US; State; Scenic
| ← SC 202 | → SC 207 |

South Carolina Highway 203 (SC 203) is a 7.750-mile-long (12.472 km) state highway in the U.S. state of South Carolina. The highway connects Abbeville and rural areas of Abbeville County.

== Route description ==
SC 203 begins at an intersection with SC 20 (North Main Street) on the northeastern corner of the central square in Abbeville, Abbeville County, where the roadway continues as Trinity Street. It travels to the northeast and immediately curves to the north-northeast before crossing over Parker Creek. It passes Abbeville High School just before leaving the city limits. The highway crosses over McCord Creek, Morrison Branch, Bailey Creek, and Job Creek before meeting its northern terminus, an intersection with SC 185 (Old Douglas Mill Road).

== Major intersections ==
The entire route is in Abbeville County.

| Location | mi | km | Destinations | Notes |
|---|---|---|---|---|
| Abbeville | 0.000 | 0.000 | SC 20 (North Main Street) to Trinity Street west / SC 72 – McCormick, Anderson | Southern terminus of SC 203; roadway continues as Trinity Street. |
| Abbeville | 0.220 | 0.354 | Chestnut Street (SC 203 Truck south) | Northern terminus of SC 203 Truck |
| | 7.750 | 12.472 | SC 185 (Old Douglas Mill Road) – Hodges, Due West | Northern terminus |
1.000 mi = 1.609 km; 1.000 km = 0.621 mi

== Abbeville truck route ==
South Carolina Highway 203 Truck
- Location: Abbeville
- Length: 0.592 mi (953 m)

South Carolina Highway 203 Truck (SC 203 Truck) is a 0.592-mile-long (0.953 km) truck route that is completely within the southeastern part of Abbeville and in the southeastern part of Abbeville County. Except for one sign near its southern terminus, it is only signed as "Truck Route".

The truck route begins at an intersection with SC 72 (Greenwood Street), where the roadway continues as a portion of South Main Street. This intersection is also the southern terminus of SC 20 Truck and SC 71 Truck, which follow SC 72 to the south. SC 203 Truck travels to the northwest on South Main Street. Immediately, it turns right onto Penny Street and heads to the north-northeast. At the end of Penny Street, it turns left onto Poplar Street and resumes its northwestern routing. At Branch Street, it turns right and travels to the northeast. Just past the northern terminus of Secession Street, it turns left onto Chestnut Street. The highway curves to the northwest. At the next intersection, it reaches its northern terminus, the SC 203 mainline (Washington Street). Here, Chestnut Street continues to the northwest.

The entire route is in Abbeville, Abbeville County.

| mi | km | Destinations | Notes |
|---|---|---|---|
| 0.000 | 0.000 | SC 72 east (Greenwood Street east) – Greenwood; South Main Street south – Cedar Springs SC 72 west (Greenwood Street west / SC 20 Truck north / SC 71 Truck north) – Calhoun Falls, McCormick | Southern terminus of SC 20 Truck, SC 71 Truck, and SC 203 Truck; South Main Street continues past intersection. |
| 0.592 | 0.953 | SC 203 (Washington Street) / Chestnut Street north | Northern terminus; Chestnut Street continues past intersection. |
1.000 mi = 1.609 km; 1.000 km = 0.621 mi
