= South Carolina Highway 185 =

State highway in South Carolina, United States

South Carolina Highway 185

Route information
- Maintained by SCDOT
- Length: 26.920 mi (43.324 km)

Major junctions
- South end: US 178 near Hodges
- SC 203 near Arborville; SC 20 near Arborville; SC 184 in Due West; SC 20 near Due West; SC 284 / SC 413 in rural Anderson County
- North end: SC 28 near Homeland Park

Location
- Country: United States
- State: South Carolina
- Counties: Greenwood, Abbeville, Anderson

Highway system
- South Carolina State Highway System; Interstate; US; State; Scenic
| ← I-185 | → SC 186 |

South Carolina Highway 185 (SC 185) is a 26.920-mile (43.324 km) state highway in the U.S. state of South Carolina. The highway connects Hodges and Due West with the Homeland Park area.

== Route description ==
SC 185 begins at an intersection with US 25/US 178 (Old Shoals Junction Road) just southeast of Hodges, within Greenwood County. US 178/SC 185 routes are co-signed off of US 25, but it is not confirmed if they are concurrent or not. It travels to the northwest and nearly immediately enters the city limits of Hodges. It and US 178 take different paths through the town, and, at one point, are only about 100 feet (30 m) apart. SC 185 curves to the southwest and passes Hodges Elementary School before leaving town. The highway winds its way through rural areas of the county and enters Abbeville County just before crossing over Long Cane Creek. Approximately 2,000 feet (610 m) later, it intersects the northern terminus of SC 203 (Old Douglas Mill Road). It then travels to the northwest, going through Arborville, before it begins a concurrency with SC 20 (Greenville Street). They cross over Park Creek just before entering Due West. At North Main Street, they meet SC 184, which joins the concurrency. The three highways travel through Erskine College and pass Erskine Theological Seminary. Immediately afterward, SC 20/SC 185 splits off onto Anderson Drive. Just after leaving town, the concurrency crosses over Chickasaw Creek. They cross over Little Hogskin Creek and Hogskin Creek before splitting, with SC 185 going to the northwest. The highway crosses over Little River and then enters Anderson County. After a crossing of Camp Creek, is an intersection with SC 284 (Trail Road) in Saylors Crossroads. The highway crosses over Bear and Hencoop creeks before intersecting SC 413 in Ebenezer Crossroads. The highway curves to the northwest and crosses over Rocky River and meets its northern terminus, an intersection with SC 28 (Abbeville Highway).

== Major intersections ==
| County | Location | mi | km | Destinations | Notes |
|---|---|---|---|---|---|
| Greenwood | | 0.000 | 0.000 | US 178 (Old Shoals Junction Road) to US 25 – Greenwood, Honea Path | Southern terminus |
| Abbeville | | 5.090 | 8.192 | SC 203 south (Old Douglas Mill Road) – Abbeville | Northern terminus of SC 203 |
| Abbeville | | 8.810 | 14.178 | SC 20 south (Greenville Street) – Abbeville | Southern end of SC 20 concurrency |
| Abbeville | Due West | 11.270 | 18.137 | SC 184 east (North Main Street) – Donalds, Honea Path | Southern end of SC 184 concurrency |
| Abbeville | Due West | 11.640 | 18.733 | SC 184 west (South Main Street) – Antreville | Northern end of SC 184 concurrency |
| Abbeville | | 15.220 | 24.494 | SC 20 north – Belton | Northern end of SC 20 concurrency |
| Anderson | Saylors Crossroads | 20.300 | 32.670 | SC 284 (Trail Road) – Antreville, Belton | |
| Anderson | Ebenezer Crossroads | 23.240 | 37.401 | SC 413 – Iva, Belton | |
| Anderson | | 26.920 | 43.324 | SC 28 (Abbeville Highway) – Greenwood, Anderson | Northern terminus |
1.000 mi = 1.609 km; 1.000 km = 0.621 mi: Concurrency terminus
