= South Carolina Highway 284 =

State highway in South Carolina, United States

South Carolina Highway 284

Route information
- Maintained by SCDOT
- Length: 19.590 mi (31.527 km)

Major junctions
- West end: SC 81 near Lowndesville
- SC 28 / SC 184 near Antreville
- East end: SC 20 in Craytonville

Location
- Country: United States
- State: South Carolina
- Counties: Abbeville, Anderson

Highway system
- South Carolina State Highway System; Interstate; US; State; Scenic
← SC 283	→ SC 288

South Carolina Highway 284 (SC 284) is a 19.590-mile-long (31.527 km) state highway in the U.S. state of South Carolina. The highway connects Westminster and Anderson.

== Route description ==
SC 284 begins at an intersection with SC 81 southeast of Lowndesville, within Abbeville County, where the roadway continues as Tom Young Bridge Road. It travels to the east and immediately crosses Gill Creek. It curves to the northeast and intersects SC 71. Then, it travels along the southeastern edge of Antreville. Just after it leaves the city limits, it intersects SC 28/SC 184. The three highways travel concurrently to the northwest. Almost immediately, they enter Antreville, where SC 184 departs to the northwest. SC 28/SC 284 leaves the city limits and split. SC 28 enters Anderson County and has intersections with the western terminus of SC 201 (Level Land Road) and then SC 185 (Due West Highway). Farther to the northeast, it meets its eastern terminus, an intersection with SC 20 in Craytonville.

== Major intersections ==
County	Location	mi	km	Destinations	Notes
Abbeville		0.000	0.000	SC 81 – Calhoun Falls, Lowndesville	Western terminus
Abbeville		2.430	3.911	SC 71 – Lowndesville, Abbeville	
Abbeville		9.010	14.500	SC 28 east / SC 184 east	Western end of SC 28 and SC 184 concurrencies
Abbeville	Antreville	9.642	15.517	SC 184 west – Iva	Eastern end of SC 184 concurrency
Abbeville		10.870	17.494	SC 28 west – Abbeville	Eastern end of SC 28 concurrency
Anderson		14.260	22.949	SC 201 east (Level Land Road) – Abbeville	Western terminus of SC 201
Anderson		16.970	27.311	SC 185 (Due West Highway) – Due West, Anderson	
Anderson	Craytonville	19.590	31.527	SC 20 – Belton, Due West	Eastern terminus
1.000 mi = 1.609 km; 1.000 km = 0.621 mi: Concurrency terminus
