= South Carolina Highway 28 =

State highway in South Carolina

South Carolina Highway 28

Route information
- Maintained by SCDOT
- Length: 131.220 mi (211.178 km)
- Existed: 1922–present
- Tourist routes: Savannah River Scenic Byway; South Carolina Heritage Corridor: Nature Route; SC Heritage Corridor: Discovery Route

Northwestern segment
- Length: 129.560 mi (208.507 km)
- West end: SR 28 at the Georgia state line near Pine Mountain, GA
- Major intersections: US 123 from Seneca to Clemson; US 76 from Seneca to Anderson; I-85 near Anderson; US 29 / US 178 / SC 24 / SC 81 in Anderson; US 378 in McCormick; US 221 from McCormick to Clarks Hill
- East end: SR 28 at the Georgia state line near Clarks Hill

Southeastern segment
- Length: 1.660 mi (2.672 km)
- West end: SR 28 at the Georgia state line in Beech Island
- East end: US 278 / SC 125 in Beech Island

Location
- Country: United States
- State: South Carolina
- Counties: Oconee, Pickens, Anderson, Abbeville, McCormick, Aiken

Highway system
- South Carolina State Highway System; Interstate; US; State; Scenic
← SC 27	→ US 29

South Carolina Highway 28 (SC 28) is a 131.220-mile (211.178 km) primary state highway in the U.S. state of South Carolina. It consists of two segments of highway signed as east–west but physically traveling north–south from the Georgia state line near Mountain Rest to Beech Island. It is part of a continuous highway separated by a 17.5-mile (28.2 km) stretch through Augusta, Georgia.

== Route description ==
SC 28 is part of a three-state highway 28, that totals 238 miles (383 km) from Tapoco, North Carolina to Beech Island, South Carolina. Both Georgia and South Carolina have two sections of Highway 28.

Starting at the Russell Bridge over the Chattooga River, SC 28 starts off as a mountain rural highway, cutting through the Chattooga Ridge at Callas Gap (highest point on route). After passing Stumphouse Mountain, the curves end as it enters Walhalla. Once south of Walhalla, the road expands to four-lane (some sections divided), traveling straight to Seneca, then east around Clemson then south towards and around Anderson. Once south of Anderson, it switches into a two-lane rural road through Antreville, around Abbeville, and through McCormick. Along the banks of Lake Strom Thurmond, it eventually crosses over a non-dammed section of the Savannah River near Augusta, Georgia.

SC 28 returns into the state, just southeast of Augusta as a four-lane highway for 1.9 miles (3.1 km) before ending in Beech Island at U.S. Route 278 (US 278) / SC 125.

== History ==
Established as an original primary route in 1922, SC 28 went northwest from Allendale, through Ellenton, to Beech Island. In 1928, it was extended southeast, replacing SC 1 from Allendale to Yemassee, then replaced SC 30 to Beaufort. Seven years later, SC 28 was truncated in Yemassee, replaced by an extension of US 21 to Beaufort.

In 1938, SC 28 was extended northwest, going through Georgia as Georgia State Route 28 to Abbeville (replacing SC 20); then from Abbeville to Anderson (replacing SC 18); and finally from Anderson to the Georgia state line along the Chattooga River (replacing SC 24).

In 1940, SC 28 was extended southeast to Gardens Corner as new primary routing; however, eight years later the extension was dropped, truncated back in Yemassee.

In 1951 or 1952, SC 28 between Beech Island and Allendale was cut off by the establishment of the Savannah River Site. In 1953, SC 28 was rerouted north around the Savannah River Site (replacing part of SC 781), then along new primary routing south to Barnwell, and then back to Allendale (replacing part of SC 3). Most of the old route became part of SC 125 and SC 641; other sections, that now reside in the Savannah River Site, are off limits.

In 1957 or 1958, two bypass routes were built along SC 28: Seneca and Abbeville; old routes through both cities became SC 28 Business. In 1959, SC 28 was straightened out east of Seneca, avoiding Newry. In the early 1960s, two more bypass routes were built along SC 28: Anderson and Pendleton; also, SC 28 was rerouted north and east around Clemson, leaving SC 93.

In 1965, SC 28 was truncated at Beech Island, all points east was replaced by US 278 and SC 68. In 1973, SC 28 was moved south onto new road between Walhalla and Bounty Land, the old route became "Old Walhalla Highway".

== Junction list ==
County	Location	mi	km	Destinations	Notes
Oconee		0.000	0.000	SR 28 north – Highlands	Continuation from Georgia; on the Russell Bridge
Oconee		8.570	13.792	SC 107 north (Oscar Wigington Scenic Byway) – Cashiers	To Oconee State Park; southern terminus of SC 107
Oconee	Walhalla	16.820	27.069	SC 183 south (College Street) – Westminster	Western end of SC 183 concurrency
Oconee	Walhalla	16.910	27.214	SC 183 north (Catherine Street) – Pickens	Eastern end of SC 183 concurrency
Oconee	West Union	18.200	29.290	SC 11 (Cherokee Foothills Scenic Highway) to I-85 south – Tamassee, Salem	Interchange
Oconee		19.710	31.720	Union Road / Popular Springs Road – Richland	Interchange
Oconee	Bounty Land	22.790	36.677	SC 188 north (Keowee School Road) / Bountyland Road	Southern terminus of SC 188
Oconee	Seneca	23.960	38.560	US 76 west / US 123 south (Sandifer Boulevard) – Westminster SC 59 south (West North 1st Street) – Seneca	Western end of US 76 and US 123 concurrencies; northern terminus of SC 59
Oconee	Seneca	25.340– 25.370	40.781– 40.829	North Pine Street / Northampton Road	Interchange
Oconee	Seneca	26.440	42.551	SC 130 (Rochester Highway) – Seneca, Newry, Salem	
Pickens	Clemson	32.690	52.609	SC 133 north (College Avenue) – Six Mile, Clemson, Clemson University	Southern terminus of SC 133
Pickens	Clemson	33.070	53.221	US 123 north (Calhoun Memorial Highway) – Easley, Greenville	Eastern end of US 123 concurrency
Pickens		33.780	54.364	SC 93 north (Old Greenville Highway) – Greenville, Clemson University, Southern Wesleyan University	Southern terminus of SC 93; interchange
Pickens		34.117– 34.160	54.906– 54.975	SC 28 Bus. east (Pendleton Road) – Pendleton	Western terminus of SC 28 Bus.
Anderson	Pendleton	37.990	61.139	SC 28 Bus. west (Mechanic Street) – Pendleton	Eastern terminus of SC 28 Bus.
Anderson	Pendleton	38.620	62.153	SC 187 south to I-85 south	Northern terminus of SC 187
Anderson	Northlake	44.208– 44.222	71.146– 71.168	I-85 – Greenville, Atlanta	I-85 exit 19
Anderson	Northlake	45.950– 45.951	73.949– 73.951	US 76 east / SC 28 Bus. east to US 178 (Clemson Boulevard) – Anderson US 178 Conn. to US 178	Eastern end of US 76 concurrency, western terminus of SC 28 Bus.; interchange; no access from US 178 Conn. to and from US 76
Anderson		50.180	80.757	SC 24 (Whitner Street) – Anderson, Townville	To Anderson Regional Airport
Anderson	Homeland Park	52.050	83.766	US 29 Bus. (Sayre Street)	
Anderson	Homeland Park	52.810	84.989	US 29 / SC 81 (Murray Avenue)	
Anderson	Homeland Park	52.940	85.199	SC 28 Bus. west (Main Street)	Eastern terminus of SC 28 Bus.
Anderson		57.160	91.990	SC 185 south (Due West Highway) – Due West	Northern terminus of SC 185
Anderson		62.720	100.938	SC 413 – Iva, Belton	
Abbeville		66.730	107.392	SC 284 north (Trail Road) – Belton	Western end of SC 284 concurrency
Abbeville	Antreville	67.980	109.403	SC 184 west – Iva	Western end of SC 184 concurrency
Abbeville		68.590	110.385	SC 284 south – Lowndesville	Eastern end of SC 284 concurrency
Abbeville		68.970	110.996	SC 184 east – Due West	Eastern end of SC 184 concurrency
Abbeville		79.410	127.798	Hill Road east (SC 20 Conn. east) to SC 20 – Due West North Main Street south (SC 28 Conn. south) to SC 71 – Abbeville	Western end of SC 20 Truck concurrency; Western terminus of SC 20 Conn.; northern terminus of SC 20 Truck and SC 28 Conn.
Abbeville	Abbeville	79.890	128.570	SC 71 – Lowndesville, Abbeville	Western end of SC 71 Truck concurrency
Abbeville		82.800	133.254	SC 20 Truck south / SC 71 Truck south / SC 72 (Greenwood Street) – Abbeville, Calhoun Falls, Mount Carmel	Eastern end of SC 20 Truck and SC 71 Truck concurrencies
McCormick		97.000	156.106	SC 81 north (Savannah River Scenic Byway) – Willington, Mount Carmel, Calhoun Falls	Southern terminus of SC 81
McCormick		102.310	164.652	SC 10 north – Greenwood	Southern terminus of SC 10
McCormick	McCormick	103.960	167.307	US 221 north / US 378 (Gold Street) – Greenwood, Lincolnton	Western end of US 221 concurrency; to Baker Creek S.P. and Hickory Knob S.P.
McCormick	Plum Branch	108.790	175.081	SC 283 east (Edgefield Street) / Collier Street – Edgefield	Western terminus of SC 283
McCormick	Modoc	118.130	190.112	SC 23 east – Edgefield	Western terminus of SC 23
McCormick	Clarks Hill	122.600	197.306	US 221 south (Clarks Hill Highway) – Appling	Eastern end of US 221 concurrency
McCormick		129.560	208.507	SR 28 east (Furys Ferry Road) – Augusta	Continuation to Georgia; on the Furys Ferry Bridge
Highway travels through Georgia as SR 28
Aiken	Beech Island	0.000	0.000	SR 28 west (Sand Bar Ferry Road) – Augusta	Continuation from Georgia; on the Sand Bar Ferry Bridge
Aiken	Beech Island	1.660	2.672	US 278 / SC 125 (Atomic Road / Williston Road east) – Barnwell, Jackson, North Augusta	Interchange; eastern terminus of SC 28 and Sandbar Ferry Road; western terminus of Williston Road; roadway continues as US 278 east (Williston Road east)
1.000 mi = 1.609 km; 1.000 km = 0.621 mi: Concurrency terminus

== Related routes ==
=== Seneca business loop ===
South Carolina Highway 28 Business
- Location: Seneca, South Carolina
- Existed: 1957–2000

SC 28 Business (SC 28 Bus.) was a business loop that used to follow original SC 28 through the downtown Seneca; it has since been decommissioned.

=== Clemson business loop ===
South Carolina Highway 28 Business
- Location: Clemson
- Existed: 1962–1964

South Carolina Highway 28 Business (SC 28 Bus.) was a business route that existed on the southern edge of Clemson. It was established in 1962 as a renumbering of US 76 Conn./US 123 Conn. from US 76/US 123/SC 28 west of the city to US 76/SC 28 and US 123 Conn. south of the main part of the city. Two years later, it was decommissioned and was redesignated as part of SC 93. Today, it is secondary roads.

=== Pendleton business loop ===
South Carolina Highway 28 Business
- Location: Pendleton, South Carolina
- Length: 3.900 mi (6.276 km)
- Existed: 1962–present
- Tourist routes: South Carolina Heritage Corridor: Discovery Route

South Carolina Highway 28 Business (SC 28 Bus.) is a 3.900 miles (6.276 km) business route that follows the original path of SC 28 through downtown Pendleton via Pendleton Road and Mechanic Street.

=== Anderson business loop ===
South Carolina Highway 28 Business
- Location: Anderson, South Carolina
- Length: 5.000 mi (8.047 km)
- Existed: 1960–present

South Carolina Highway 28 Business (SC 28 Bus.) is a five-point-zero-zero-zero-mile (8.047 km) business route that follows the original path of SC 28 through downtown Anderson via Clemson Boulevard and Main Street.

=== Antreville alternate route ===
South Carolina Highway 28 Alternate
- Location: Antreville
- Existed: 1938–1947

South Carolina Highway 28 Alternate (SC 28 Alt.) was an alternate route that existed entirely along the northeastern edge of Antreville. In 1938, it was established as a renumbering of SC 18 Alt. from SC 184 to SC 28/SC 284. In 1947, it was decommissioned and downgraded to a secondary road, Wall Street.

=== Abbeville connector ===
South Carolina Highway 28 Connector
- Location: Abbeville, South Carolina
- Length: 0.420 mi (676 m)

South Carolina 28 Connector (SC 28 Conn.) is an unsigned connector road following North Main Street northwest of downtown Abbeville. It travels 0.420 miles (0.676 km) between SC 71 and SC 28 and the unsigned SC 20 Conn. and SC 20 Truck.

The entire route is in Abbeville County.

Location	mi	km	Destinations	Notes
Abbeville	0.000	0.000	North Main Street (SC 71)	Southern terminus; SC 71 takes on North Main Street name.
	0.420	0.676	SC 28 east (SC 20 Truck south) – McCormick, Abbeville County Law Enforcement Center, Sheriff's and magistrates's offices, Detention center SC 28 west – Antreville, Anderson Hill Road east (SC 20 Conn. east) to SC 20 – Due West	Northern terminus of SC 20 Truck and SC 28 Conn.; western terminus of SC 20 Conn.
1.000 mi = 1.609 km; 1.000 km = 0.621 mi

=== South Carolina Highway 28Y (Abbeville) ===
South Carolina Highway 28Y
- Location: Abbeville
- Existed: c.1941–1957

South Carolina Highway 28Y (SC 28Y) was a connector between SC 72 and SC 28 southwest of Abbeville. In 1957, as part of SC 28 being shifted westward to bypass the city, SC 28Y became part of the mainline's path.

=== Abbeville business loop ===
South Carolina Highway 28 Business
- Location: Abbeville, South Carolina
- Existed: 1957–1989

SC 28 Bus. was a business loop used to follow original SC 28 through downtown Abbeville; it has since been decommissioned.

=== Ellenton alternate route ===
South Carolina Highway 28 Alternate
- Location: Ellenton, South Carolina
- Existed: c.1937–1942

South Carolina Highway 28 Alternate (SC 28 Alt.) was an alternate route that provided direct access to Ellenton's town center from the mainline. In 1942, it was decommissioned and was redesignated as SC 649. Today, it is part of SRS Route 3.

=== Hampton alternate route ===
South Carolina Highway 28 Alternate
- Location: Hampton
- Existed: 1938–1947

South Carolina Highway 28 Alternate (SC 28 Alt.) was an alternate route that existed entirely within the city limits of Hampton, when SC 28 existed there. It utilized Magnolia Street and Lee Avenue. In 1947, it was decommissioned and downgraded to secondary roads.

=== South Carolina Highway 28Y (Yemassee) ===
South Carolina Highway 28Y
- Location: Yemassee
- Existed: 1938–1947

South Carolina Highway 28Y (SC 28Y) was a suffixed highway that was established in 1938 as a connection between US 17/US 21 (now US 17 Alt./US 21) and the SC 28 mainline when it used to exist in the town. In 1947, it was decommissioned and was redesignated as part of the mainline's path. Today, it is the easternmost portion of SC 68.

== See also ==
- UofSC Digital Collections - UofSC Digital Collections (Heritage Corridor Route Map)
- South Carolina National Heritage Corridor
