= Frazier-Pressley House =

Historic house in South Carolina, United States

- U.S. Historic district – Contributing property
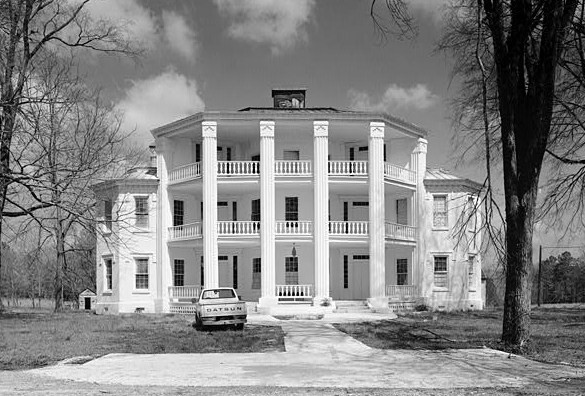

- Location within South Carolina Location within the United States
- Location: 4756 Cedar Springs Road; Bradley, South Carolina 29819
- Coordinates: 34.0823632°N 82.3020453°W
- Area: Cedar Springs Historic District
- Built: 1856
- Architectural style: Octagonal mode

Frazier-Pressley House is an octagon house that is a contributing property in the Cedar Springs Historic District, in Abbeville County, South Carolina.

The Frazier-Pressley House is a three-story, stuccoed brick building. It is believed that it was built for Captain James W. Frazier in 1852 to 1856. The house has three octagonal elements joined with a connecting hallway. There is a two-story, brick extension to the rear. The facade has four three-story brick columns. The house has five brick chimneys. It originally had a widow's walk on the top of the central octagon. The house has eleven major rooms. Each of the floors of each octagon is a single room. The plan of the house is believed to be unique in the United States.

The Frazier-Pressley House gets its name from first owner, Captain James W. Frazier and from Dr. Joseph Lowry Pressley, James Frazier's son-in-law. Capt. Frazier bequeathed the house to his daughter, Tallulah H. Frazier Pressley at the time of his death in 1875. Dr. and Mrs. Pressley live there until their deaths and then their son, Harlan David Pressley inherited the house. Harlan's wife, Dessie Whetstone Pressley lived in the house until her death March 13, 1966.
