= South Carolina Highway 201 =

State highway in South Carolina, United States

South Carolina Highway 201

Route information
- Maintained by SCDOT
- Length: 12.550 mi (20.197 km)

Major junctions
- South end: SC 20 north of Abbeville
- SC 184 near Due West
- North end: SC 284 near Antreville

Location
- Country: United States
- State: South Carolina
- Counties: Abbeville, Anderson

Highway system
- South Carolina State Highway System; Interstate; US; State; Scenic
← SC 200	→ SC 202

South Carolina Highway 201 (SC 201) is a 12.550-mile-long (20.197 km) state highway in the U.S. state of South Carolina. The highway travels through rural areas of Abbeville and Anderson counties, and does not travel through any cities or towns. Virtually all of the highway is in Abbeville County with only a small portion, 3/4 mile (1.2 km) of the highway's total length, at the northern end in Anderson County.

== Route description ==
SC 201 begins at an intersection with SC 20 (Greenville Street) north of Abbeville, within Abbeville County. It travels to the north-northwest and crosses over Reid Creek. After a crossing of Park Creek is one over Little River. Then, it intersects with SC 184 southwest of Due West. At the intersection with Troy Murdock Road, the highway enters Anderson County. Approximately 3/4 mile (1.2 km) later, it meets its northern terminus, an intersection with SC 284 (Trail Road). This intersection is north-northeast of Antreville. Here, the roadway continues as Level Land Road.

== Major intersections ==
County	Location	mi	km	Destinations	Notes
Abbeville		0.000	0.000	SC 20 (Greenville Street) – Abbeville, Due West	Southern terminus
Abbeville		6.600	10.622	SC 184 – Antreville, Due West	
Anderson		12.550	20.197	SC 284 (Trail Road) / Level Land Road north – Antreville, Belton	Northern terminus; roadway continues as Level Land Road.
1.000 mi = 1.609 km; 1.000 km = 0.621 mi
