= Donalds =

Donalds may refer to:

== Places and locations ==
- Donalds, South Carolina, a town in Abbeville County, South Carolina, United States
  - Donalds Grange No. 497, city hall building in the town

== People ==
- Donalds (surname)
