= Calhoun Falls Charter School =

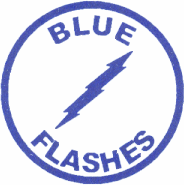

Location
- 205 Edgefield St; Calhoun Falls, South Carolina 29628; United States
- 34°05′58″N 82°35′47″W

Information
- Type: Public charter
- Motto: "Educate. Empower. Inspire.”
- Established: 2008 (18 years ago)
- School district: Charter Institute At Erskine
- CEEB code: 410275
- Principal: Kalan Rogers
- Grades: 6–12
- Enrollment: 87
- Colors: Blue and gold
- Nickname: Blue Flashes
- Website: cfpcs.org

Calhoun Falls Charter School (CFCS) is a public 6–12 school located in Calhoun Falls, South Carolina, United States. Founded in 2008, It is a combined middle and high school.

CFCS was awarded a charter in 2008 and opened its doors in August of that year. The school is autonomous, but operated under the South Carolina Public Charter School District until 2018. Since August 2018 CFCS is under the sponsorship of the Charter Institute at Erskine.

As of 2024, US News ranks it 139th for high schools in South Carolina. It has a minority enrollment of 61%, with 100% of the students classified as economically disadvantaged.

== Origin ==
After a vote by the Abbeville County school board, Calhoun Falls High School was closed in December 2007. The people of the town of Calhoun Falls reacted by forming a charter school. Calhoun Falls Charter School on the same campus as the former Calhoun Falls High School.

== Administration ==
The Principal is a Calhoun Falls Charter School alumni, Kaitlyn Norris. Assistant Principal is Lori Lindler, a Calhoun Falls High School graduate.

== Academics ==
The school graduated its first class in June 2009, with 32 graduating seniors. CFCS offers courses at the college prep and honors levels, as well as college dual-enrollment courses through an agreement with Piedmont Technical College.

== Athletics ==
CFSC's athletic teams are known as the Blue Flashes.

Calhoun Falls Charter School Booster Club is a not-for-profit 503(C) organization that raises funds for the sole purpose of funding organized sports within the school. No public tax dollars are used to fund these programs.
