= Crayton =

Crayton may refer to:

== People ==
- James Crayton, boxer
- Louis Crayton, footballer
- Patrick Crayton, American football player
- Pee Wee Crayton, musician

== Places ==
- Craytonia, Georgia, an unincorporated community, United States
- Craytonville, South Carolina, an unincorporated community, United States
