= Richard Valentine =

American politician

Richard M. Valentine (born 1822) was elected as a minister, farmer, and state legislator-elect in South Carolina during the Reconstruction era. He resigned before serving.

He was born in South Carolina. He was an A.M.E. minister and was elected to represent Abbeville County in the South Carolina House.
