= Fox Creek High School =

Location
- 165 Shortcut Road; North Augusta, South Carolina 29860; United States
- Coordinates: 33°36′28″N 81°56′25″W

Information
- Type: Public charter school
- Opened: 2004 (21 years ago)
- School district: South Carolina Public Charter School District
- Superintendent: Wayne Brazell
- Principal: Josh Trahan
- Teaching staff: 40.50 (on an FTE basis)
- Grades: 9–12
- Enrollment: 691 (2023–2024)
- Student to teacher ratio: 17.06
- Campus size: 30 acres (12 ha)
- Campus type: Suburban
- Colors: Red and black
- Mascot: Predator
- Newspaper: The Predator Press
- Website: www.foxcreekhighschool.org

Fox Creek High School is a public college-preparatory charter school within the South Carolina Public Charter School District, located near North Augusta, South Carolina, United States. It serves students in grades 9–12 (with expansion plans to include a middle school) in Aiken and Edgefield counties.

== Academics ==
Fox Creek High School partners with nearby Piedmont Technical College to offer a selection of advanced dual-enrollment courses. Students take college level American and world history, college level English, college level biology, and college level trigonometry and calculus. All dual-enrollment courses are taken on Fox Creek's campus through accredited teachers.

In addition, the school offers multiple Advanced Placement courses.

=== Red Fox and Silver Fox Academies ===
Students that complete 4 credits of Career/Technology courses with a 3.0 GPA or better graduate with the Red Fox Academy distinction.

Students that complete 12 credit hours in dual-enrollment courses with a 3.75 GPA or better graduate with the Silver Fox Academy distinction.

== Sports ==
The Fox Creek Predators field 17 varsity teams, and compete in the SCHSL Region 5-AAA.

In 2017, the Fox Creek varsity baseball team defeated Latta High School to clinch the school's first state championship.
