= Valentine Young =

American politician

Valentine Young Jr. was an American politician. He was a Baptist minister and politician in South Carolina. He represented Abbeville County in the South Carolina Senate in 1868.

He was a reverend. His election was disputed and whether he met the qualifications to hold office challenged. The state senate moved to declare the seat vacant stating he had failed to show up and show his credentials. He was a Baptist. He was white. James S. Cothran, a Democrat, was elected to replace him but that election was declared void.
