= Calhoun Falls State Park =

State Park in South Carolina, United States

- Interactive map of Calhoun Falls State Park
- Nearest city: Calhoun Falls, South Carolina
- Coordinates: 34°06′28″N 82°37′11″W
- Area: 318 acres (1 km^{2})
- Camp sites: tent and RV sites
- Hiking trails: 1.75 mile loop Cedar Bluff Nature Trail
- Website: https://southcarolinaparks.com/calhoun-falls

Calhoun Falls State Park is a state park located on the shores of Lake Russell near the town of Calhoun Falls in Abbeville County, South Carolina.

== Activities and amenities ==
Activities available at the park include picnicking, fishing, hiking, swimming, biking, and camping.

Amenities include a playground, a boat ramp, picnic shelters, tennis courts, a basketball court and a park store. Fishing rods and reels are available for rental at the park office.

A marina offers boat slips available for rental on a yearly basis.

The park also manages McCalla State Natural Area, a 6,239 acres (25 km^{2}) future backcountry park, located near the town of Lowndesville. It has a 10-mile trail for equestrian use with previous permission from Calhoun Falls State Park.
