= Calhoun Falls High School =

Public school in South Carolina, United States

Calhoun Falls Charter School

Location
- Calhoun Falls, Abbeville, South Carolina 29628; United States
- Coordinates: 34°5′59″N 82°35′48″W

Information
- Type: Public
- Closed: 2008

Calhoun Falls High School, the former name of Calhoun Falls Charter School, is located in Calhoun Falls, South Carolina.

Calhoun Falls High School was one of the smallest high schools in the state, with fewer than 200 students attending. It was scheduled to close at the end of the 2008 school year, and students would be sent to other county schools: Abbeville High School and Dixie High School. However, this plan was challenged by students and parents within the community. Instead, Calhoun Falls High School became Calhoun Falls Charter School in which it does not operate under Abbeville County School District.

One notable alumnus is baseball player Neil Chrisley. Another is football wide receiver Martavis Bryant.
