= Roosevelt Antrim =

American blues musician

- Born: Theodore Roosevelt Antrum; 1903–1910 (uncertain); Possibly Hodges, South Carolina, United States
- Died: May 21, 1948 Charlotte, North Carolina, United States
- Genres: Piedmont blues; Blues
- Instrument: vocals

Theodore Roosevelt Antrum (1903–10 – May 21, 1948) was an American blues musician from South Carolina, United States. Little is known of his life.

Antrum was possibly born in Hodges, South Carolina, United States. His exact birth date is unknown, and was speculated by census records to be as early as 1903 and as late as 1910. Antrim recorded four songs for Bluebird Records in Charlotte, North Carolina, in 1937. Three of the records are Twelve-bar blues songs, and one is a Piedmont blues song, possibly influenced by contemporary North Carolina musician Blind Boy Fuller. It is unknown whether Antrim played the guitar on any of the records.

Antrim died on May 21, 1948. He is buried in York Memorial Cemetery, in Charlotte, North Carolina.

== Recordings ==
All recordings were made on August 7, 1937, in Charlotte, North Carolina

- "No Use of Worryin'"
- "Complaint To Make"
- "I Guess You're Satisfied"
- "Station Boy Blues"
