= South Carolina Public Charter School District =

School district in South Carolina, United States

Location
- 1824 Barnwell Street Columbia, South Carolina, United States

District information
- Grades: Pre-k–12th
- Established: 2006
- Superintendent: Chris G. Neeley
- Deputy superintendent(s): Emily Paul; Michael Thom; John R. Payne; Emalee Baker
- Chair of the board: John Payne
- Schools: 38
- Budget: $3.45 million
- NCES District ID: 4503901
- District ID: 4701

Students and staff
- Students: 17,100 (2022)
- Teachers: 1244
- Staff: 31 FTEs (full-time equivalent)
- Student–teacher ratio: 13.45:1

Other information
- Website: www.sccharter.org

The South Carolina Public Charter School District (SCPCSD) is a school district based in Columbia, South Carolina, United States. It includes 38 public charter schools across the state. The district has approximately 17,500 students.

== Funding ==
The South Carolina Public Charter School District is semi-unique in the United States for being one of the few public school districts that span the entire state.

SCPCSD is provided funding based on student population by a local school district. The South Carolina state legislature appropriates a per pupil amount through an annual budget proviso––$3,600/student for those attending a brick-and-mortar school, $1,900 for those enrolled in a virtual school, and 4,300/student for those enrolled in a special education program.

Another way for a public charter school to open in South Carolina is through the auspices of a local public school district. However, many such traditional districts are hesitant to open public charter schools for a variety of reasons. The SCPCSD was created as a charter school authorizer by the state legislature as an alternative method for public charter schools to be approved for operation in the state. The state legislature did this, in part, to resolve various legal questions regarding resource allocation for public charter schools in local districts. In addition, the legislature hoped that competition with local school districts might lead to greater reform for the state's historically lagging public school system.

== Schools ==
The district oversees the following public schools, of which some are traditional "brick and mortar" schools and some are virtual schools:

| School name | Location | Grades |
|---|---|---|
| Bettis Preparatory Leadership Academy | Trenton | K–8 |
| Bridges Preparatory School | Beaufort | K–12 |
| Butler Academy | Hartsville | K–6 |
| Calhoun Falls Charter School | Calhoun Falls | 6–12 |
| Cape Romain Environmental Education Charter School | McClellanville | PK-8 |
| Charleston Advancement Academy | Charleston | 9-12 |
| Coastal Leadership Academy | Myrtle Beach | 9–12 |
| Compass Collegiate Academy | Charleston | K-2 |
| East Link Academy | Greenville | PK-8 |
| East Point Academy | Cayce | PK-8 |
| Felton Laboratory Charter School | Orangeburg | K-8 |
| Fox Creek High School | North Augusta | 9–12 |
| GREEN Charter School of Greenville | Greenville | K-8 |
| GREEN Charter School of the Lowcountry | Charleston | K-8 |
| GREEN Charter School of the Midlands | Irmo | K-8 |
| GREEN Charter School of Spartanburg | Spartanburg | K-8 |
| GREEN Upstate High School | Simpsonville | 9-12 |
| Greenville Technical Charter High School | Greenville | 9-12 |
| Greer Middle College Charter High School | Taylors | 9-12 |
| High Point Academy | Spartanburg | PK-12 |
| Imagine Columbia Leadership Academy | Columbia | K–5 |
| Lakes and Bridges Charter School | Easley | 1-8 |
| LEAD Academy | Greenville | K-8 |
| Learn4Life High School Charleston | Charleston | 9-12 |
| Legacy Early College | Greenville | PK-12 |
| Legion Collegiate Academy | Rock Hill | 9–12 |
| Liberty STEAM Charter School | Sumter | K-2 |
| Lowcountry Acceleration Academy | North Charleston | 9-12 |
| Lowcountry Montessori School | Beaufort | PK–12 |
| Meyer Center for Special Children | Greenville | PK-2 |
| Midlands Arts Conservatory | Columbia | 6-11 |
| Midlands Middle College | Columbia | 11-12 |
| Palmetto Achievement Center for Excellence Academy (PACE) | Columbia | 2-8 |
| Palmetto Scholars Academy | North Charleston | 6–12 |
| Pee Dee Math, Science and Technology Academy | Bishopville | K–12 |
| Polaris Tech Charter School | Ridgeland | 5-12 |
| Riverwalk Academy | Rock Hill | K–12 |
| Royal Live Oaks Academy of Arts & Sciences | Hardeeville | K–8 |
| SC Whitmore School | virtual school | 9–12 |
| South Carolina Science Academy | Columbia | 6–11 |
| South Carolina Virtual Charter School | virtual school | K–12 |
| Spartanburg Preparatory School | Spartanburg | K–10 |
| Tall Pines STEM Academy | Aiken | 5–8 |
| York Preparatory Academy | Rock Hill | K–12 |
| Youth Leadership Academy (affiliated with Clemson University) | Pickens | 6–8 |

Many of the district's virtual learning schools use an education management company. In some states, these companies are for-profit, but in South Carolina these companies are prohibited by law from being for-profit. The schools are actually different entities than the management companies that serve the schools. For example, Palmetto State e-Cademy changed its education management company in 2009, which demonstrates that the school is broader than the hired management company. Palmetto State e-Cademy later decided that it could operate without an EMO, and has been operating that way for the last two years. In practice, the line between school and education management company can be difficult to see, but the law in South Carolina is clear in making an operational and organizational distinction between the education management companies and the schools.
