= Greenville Presbyterian Church (South Carolina) =

Historic church in South Carolina, United States

- U.S. National Register of Historic Places
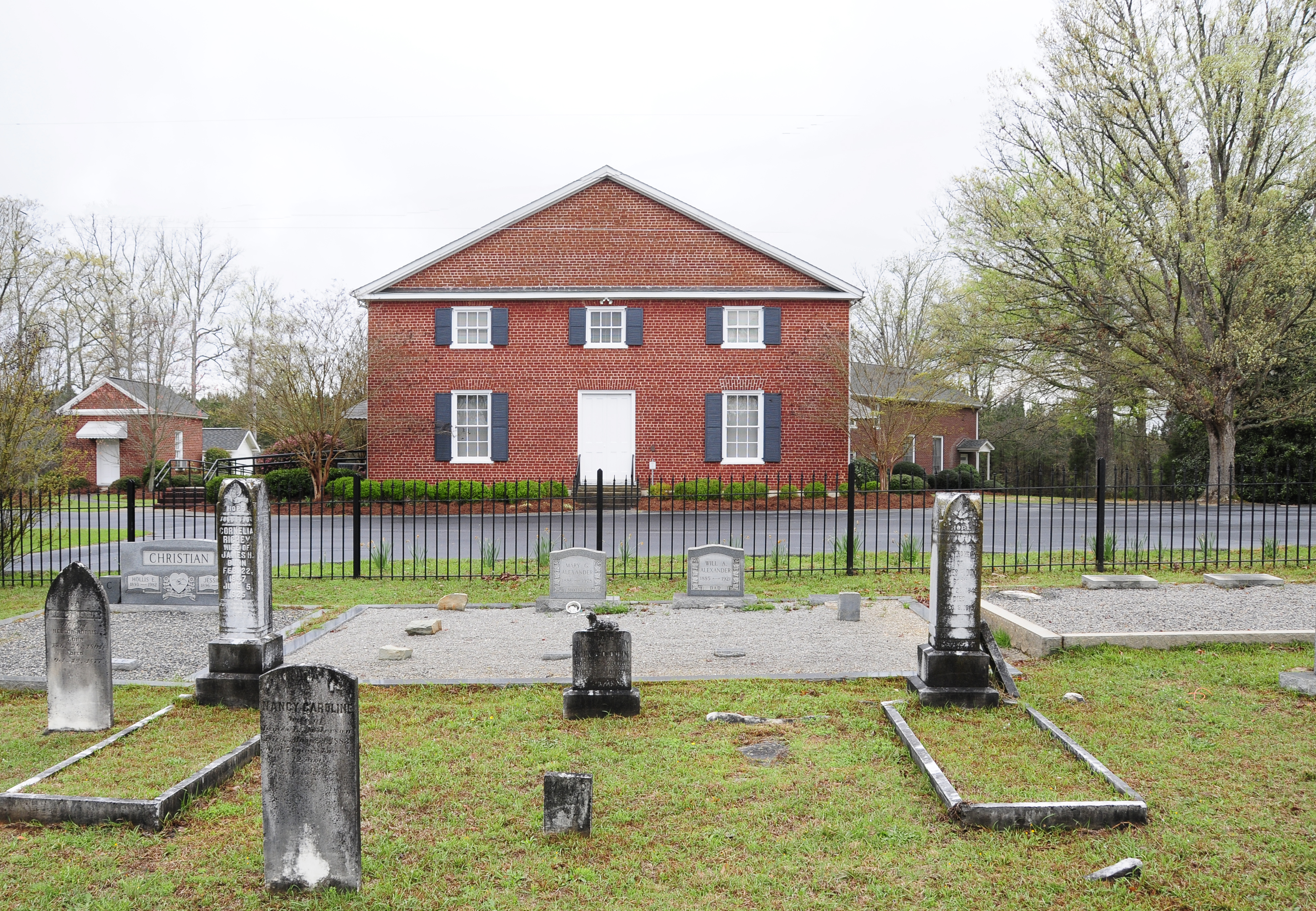
- Greenville Presbyterian Church, March 2012

- Location within South Carolina Location within the United States
- Location: Greenville Church Rd., near Donalds, South Carolina
- Coordinates: 34°20′50″N 82°18′14″W
- Area: 10.6 acres (4.3 ha)
- Built: 1852
- Architect: Multiple
- Architectural style: Greek Revival
- NRHP reference No.: 98000561
- Added to NRHP: May 20, 1998

Greenville Presbyterian Church is a historic Presbyterian church located near Donalds, Greenwood County, South Carolina. It was built in 1852 and is a meeting house form, Greek Revival style brick church. Also on the property are a small brick Session House, a large historic cemetery containing about 1,200 identifiable graves, and a natural spring. The earliest graves in the church cemetery date from 1777 and numerous markers indicate service in the American Revolution and American Civil War.

It was listed on the National Register of Historic Places in 1998.
