= SC Whitmore School =

Location
- 501 Commerce Drive; Columbia, South Carolina, 29233; United States
- Coordinates: 34.1612°N 81.3506°W

Information
- Type: Charter
- Established: 2011
- Director: Kim Dunbar
- Grades: 9-12
- Website: www.scwhitmoreschool.org

SC Whitmore School in South Carolina is a virtual school that is authorized by the South Carolina Public Charter School District, an extension of the South Carolina Department of Education. Opened in August 2011, it offers free public school that high school students in grades 9-12 attend from home.

Coursework is self-paced and based upon mastery learning. Students work with certified teachers in self-paced, asynchronous classes to revise their assignments until they have demonstrated mastery.

The SC Whitmore School is accredited by the AdvancED Accreditation Commission.

== Administration ==
The current Executive Director of SC Whitmore School is Kim Dunbar.

== See also ==
- List of virtual schools
- South Carolina Public Charter School District
