= South Carolina Science Academy =

Coordinates: 34.0135°N 81.0358°W

- Columbia, South Carolina; United States

Information
- School type: Charter school
- Opened: Fall of 2014
- Closed: 2018
- School district: SC Public Charter School District
- Director: Raymond "Pat" Padgett
- Grades: 6th through 12th grade
- Gender: Coed
- Education system: Blended Learning
- Colours: white, red, navy, and light blue
- Athletics: no
- Mascot: Atoms
- School fees: $100 per annum
- Website: www.scscienceacademy.org

The South Carolina Science Academy (SCSA) was a tuition-free public charter school in Columbia, South Carolina, open to all students that reside in South Carolina. SCSA was a publicly funded school that focuses on science, technology, engineering, and mathematics (STEM). The school currently had enrollment of 136 students in grades 6–12 at the time of closing. The target student population was 450 students. The inaugural year for the South Carolina Science Academy was originally set to be 2012, but the sudden death of the school's founder, Mr. Nathan Yon, pushed that date back to 2014.

The SC Science Academy had received a ten-year charter, had been approved by the South Carolina Department of Education, and was authorized by the South Carolina Public Charter School District in 2011. In accordance with the charter school model, an annually elected board of directors composed of local business leaders, educators, and parents governed the school.

Enrollment in the 2016 school year was 140 students.

The school was AdvancED accredited, and it rated "Good" in opportunities in foreign language. In 2016, the school had 1.3 professional development days per teacher, and 37.5% of its teachers were on continuing contracts.

On May 10, 2018, the South Carolina Public Charter School District voted to revoke SC Science Academy's charter, closing the school at the end of the year.
