= Kennan Gilchrist =

American gridiron football player (born 1994)

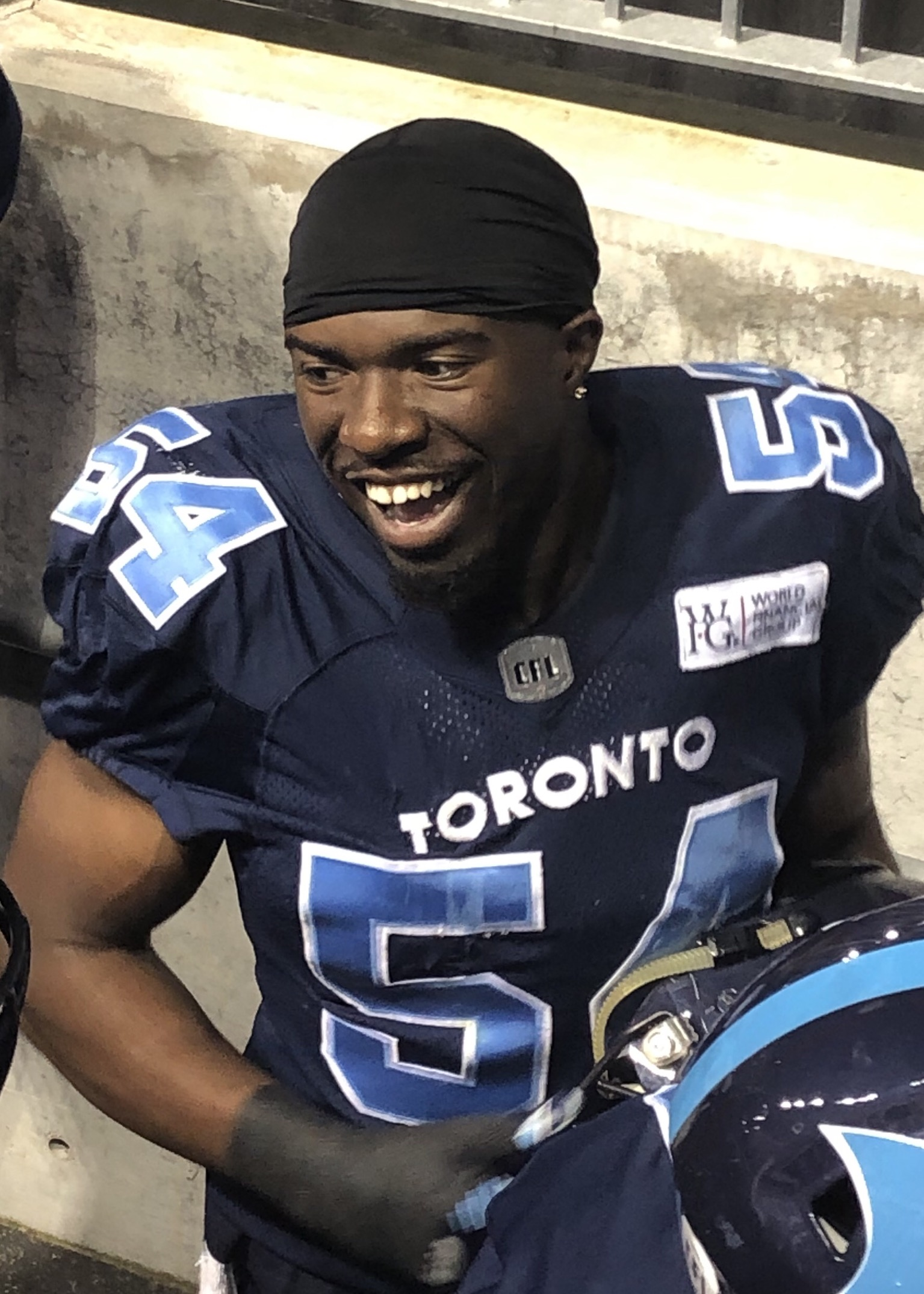
- Gilchrist with the Toronto Argonauts in 2019

No. 54
- Position: Linebacker

Personal information
- Born: September 13, 1994 (age 32); Abbeville, South Carolina, U.S.
- Listed height: 6 ft 2 in (1.88 m)
- Listed weight: 225 lb (102 kg)

Career information
- High school: Abbeville (SC)
- College: Appalachian State
- NFL draft: 2017: undrafted

Career history
- 2017: Dallas Cowboys*
- 2017–2018: Houston Texans*
- 2019: San Antonio Commanders
- 2019–2020: Toronto Argonauts
- * Offseason or practice squad member only

Awards and highlights
- Second-team All-Sun Belt (2016)
- Stats at CFL.ca

Kennan Gilchrist (born September 13, 1994) is an American former professional football linebacker who played for the Toronto Argonauts of the Canadian Football League (CFL). He played college football at Appalachian State University. He was also a member of the Dallas Cowboys and Houston Texans of the National Football League (NFL), and the San Antonio Commanders of the Alliance of American Football (AAF).

== Early life ==
Gilchrist attended Abbeville High School. As a junior, he tallied 99 tackles (8 for loss), 7 sacks, 2 interceptions and a fumble recovery; all three turnovers he returned for touchdowns. He contributed to the team having a 13-1 record and winning the 2011 South Carolina Class A I state championship. He received Class A South Carolina Defensive Player of the Year, first-team all-state, all-conference, all-region and all-area honors.

As a senior, he collected 130 tackles, 9 sacks and 2 forced fumbles. He contributed to the team having a 13-3 record and reaching the 2012 South Carolina AA II title game. He received Class AA South Carolina Defensive Player of the Year, first-team all-state, all-conference, all-region and all-area honors. He participated in the 2012 South Carolina North-South all-star game.

== College career ==
Gilchrist accepted a football scholarship from Appalachian State University. As a true freshman, he appeared in all 12 games as a backup linebacker, posting 59 tackles (fourth on the team), 4.5 tackles for loss (tied for fourth on the team) and 2 forced fumbles (tied for the team lead). He had 9 tackles against Georgia Southern University and Wofford College.

As a sophomore, he appeared in all 12 games with 11 starts at outside linebacker. He registered 44 tackles (fourth on the team), 3 sacks (fourth on the team) and 6 tackles for loss (tied for second on the team). He had 7 tackles and a half-sack against the University of Louisiana at Monroe.

As a junior, he started all 13 games at outside linebacker. He collected 61 tackles (fifth on the team). He had 7 tackles (one for loss) against Clemson University.

As a senior, he totaled 89 tackles (second on the team), 11 tackles for loss (led the team), 3 sacks and one forced fumble. His forced fumble against University of Tennessee quarterback Josh Dobbs on third-and-goal in overtime, nearly gave his team a win against the No. 9 ranked team in the nation. He made 15 tackles (3.5 for loss) against Texas State University, receiving Sun Belt Defensive Player of the Week honors.

== Professional career ==
=== Dallas Cowboys ===
Gilchrist was signed as an undrafted free agent by the Dallas Cowboys after the 2017 NFL draft on May 12. He was released before the start of the season on September 2, 2017.

=== Houston Texans ===
On September 26, 2017, he was signed by the Houston Texans to the practice squad, where he spent the rest of the season.

On August 31, 2018, he was released. On December 11, 2018, he was signed to the practice squad. On December 23, 2018, he was released from the practice squad.

=== San Antonio Commanders ===
In 2018, he signed with the San Antonio Commanders of the Alliance of American Football. In March 2019, the league filed for bankruptcy after 8 games.

=== Toronto Argonauts ===
On April 16, 2019, Gilchrist signed with the Toronto Argonauts of the Canadian Football League. He played in 14 games with 6 starts, making 30 defensive tackles, 4 sacks, one interception and 7 special teams tackles.

He did not play in 2020 after the season was canceled due to the COVID-19 pandemic. He was released by the Argonauts on December 15, 2020.
