= Bridges Preparatory School =

Public charter school in Beaufort, South Carolina, United States

- Bridges Prep logo

Location
- 555 Robert Smalls Parkway; South Carolina Lowcountry; Beaufort, Beaufort County, South Carolina 29907; United States; 32.414950°N 80.748064°W

Information
- Type: Public charter school
- Opened: August 2013
- Status: Open
- School district: South Carolina Public Charter School District
- NCES District ID: 4503901
- School code: SC-4701-027
- CEEB code: 419399
- Principal, K-5: Bridgette Halker
- Principal, grades 6-12: Daniel Tooman
- Head of school: Gary McCullough
- Grades: K–12
- Enrollment: 1064 (2020-2021)
  - Kindergarten: 66
  - Grade 1: 69
  - Grade 2: 65
  - Grade 3: 69
  - Grade 4: 68
  - Grade 5: 69
  - Grade 6: 68
  - Grade 7: 65
  - Grade 8: 46
  - Grade 9: 35
  - Grade 10: 44
  - Grade 11: ~
- Average class size: 19-21
- Hours in school day: 7
- Campuses: 2
- Campus size: 18 acres (7.3 ha)
- Campus type: Suburban
- Colors: Royal blue and white
- Athletics conference: South Carolina High School League
- Sports: Basketball; Volleyball; Soccer; Cross country; Tennis
- Mascot: Buccaneer
- Newspaper: Buccaneer Bulletin
- Feeder schools: Beaufort County School District
- Website: www.bridgesprep.org

Bridges Preparatory School is a public charter school within the South Carolina Public Charter School District, located in Beaufort, South Carolina, United States. The school serves students from most parts of Beaufort County. It enrolled 700 students in the 2017–18 school year.

== Academics ==
According to data released by the South Carolina Department of Education Bridges Preparatory School showed 56 percent of elementary students achieved standards in English/language arts in 2015–16, seventh among 24 South Carolina Public Charter School District members offering elementary instruction. Math standards were met by 53 percent of students, ranking sixth. In 2015–16, the average student-teacher ratio in core subjects was 15.90 students for every 1 teacher.

== Athletics ==
Bridges Prep competes at the Class A level in the South Carolina High School League. The school fields teams for boys in basketball, cross country, and soccer; and for girls in volleyball, basketball, cross country, and softball.

== Campuses ==
Since Bridges Prep opened, they have used several different campuses for different groups of students.

School year	Boundary Street Campus	Green Street Campus	Celedon Club Campus	Port Royal Campus
2013–14	2nd–6th grade	K–1st grad	Not yet acquired	Not yet acquired
2014–15	2nd–7th grade	K–1st grade	Not yet acquired	Not yet acquired
2015–16	4th–8th grade	2nd–3rd grade	K–1st grade	Not yet acquired
2016–17	2nd–6th grade	7th–9th grade	K–1st grade	Acquired, not built
2017–18	2nd–7th	8th–10th grade	K–1st grade	Acquired, not built
2018–19	3rd–7th grade	Lease not renewed	K–2nd grade	8th–11th grade
2019-20	2nd-8th grade	-	K-1	High school; in January, grades 5th through 8th moved into the new campus

=== Boundary Street Campus ===
The Boundary Street Campus was the main campus of the school since its beginning in 2013. Located at 1100 Boundary Street in Downtown Beaufort, SC, the building was previously owned by the Boys and Girl's Club of the Lowcountry. The City of Beaufort, SC bought the property from the school in December 2021, intending for it to become a Cybersecurity Education Center in conjunction with the University of South Carolina.

=== Green Street Campus ===
The Green Street Campus was the secondary campus of the school, located at 1001 Hamar Street in downtown Beaufort. The building is owned by the City of Beaufort and leased to the school until the 2018-19 fiscal/school year, when the school ceased using the facility. In the 2018-19 school year, the campus was reacquired on an emergency, temporary basis due to the fact that severe rain caused the new campus to flood, preventing them from paving.

=== Celadon Campus ===
The Celadon Campus was located at the Old Celadon Club on Lady's Island, until the school relocated the grades into the newly formed Port Royal Campus.

=== Port Royal Campus ===
In 2016, Bridges Preparatory School purchased 18 acres (7.3 ha) of land in Beaufort, on which they planned to build a 90,000-square-foot (8,400 m^{2}) school building for kindergarten through grade 12 students. In October 2018, students in grades 8 to 11 were moved into "temporary modular classrooms" erected on the new campus property. On January 7, 2020, grades 5 through 8 were moved from the main campus to the new building. The school planned to move all grades by the 2020–2021 school year. By 2024, all grade levels were in the campus, unifying the school into the final campus.
