= Craytonia, Georgia =

Craytonia
- Unincorporated community
- Location within the state of Georgia Craytonia (the United States)
- Coordinates: 34°50′10″N 84°09′33″W
- Country: United States
- State: Georgia
- County: Fannin
- Elevation: 2,136 ft (651 m)
- Time zone: UTC-5 (Eastern (EST))
  - Summer (DST): UTC-4 (EDT)
- Area codes: 706 & 762
- GNIS ID: 351048

Craytonia (also Cretonia) is an unincorporated community in Fannin County, Georgia, United States.

== History ==
Prior to European colonization, the area that is now Craytonia was inhabited by the Cherokee people and other Indigenous peoples for thousands of years.
