= Leomont Evans =

American football player (born 1974)

No. 35, 45
- Position: Safety

Personal information
- Born: July 12, 1974 (age 52); Abbeville, South Carolina, U.S.
- Listed height: 6 ft 1 in (1.85 m)
- Listed weight: 213 lb (97 kg)

Career information
- High school: Abbeville
- College: Clemson
- NFL draft: 1996: 5th round, 138th overall pick

Career history
- Washington Redskins (1996–1999); Detroit Lions (2000)*; Los Angeles Xtreme (2001); Houston Texans (2002)
- * Offseason or practice squad member only

Awards and highlights
- Second-team All-ACC (1995)

Career NFL statistics
- Tackles: 152
- Interceptions: 3
- Fumble recoveries: 2
- Stats at Pro Football Reference

Leomont Dozier Evans (born July 12, 1974) is an American former professional football player who was a safety for the Washington Redskins of the National Football League (NFL). He also played for the Los Angeles Xtreme of the XFL. He played college football for the Clemson Tigers and was selected in the fifth round of the 1996 NFL draft. In 2002, Evans suffered a serious neck injury in the first half of the Houston Texans' NFL debut against the New York Giants.

He has three children: Kamyia, 24, Cierra, 18, and son Leomont Jr., 22.
