= Donalds Grange No. 497 =

- U.S. National Register of Historic Places
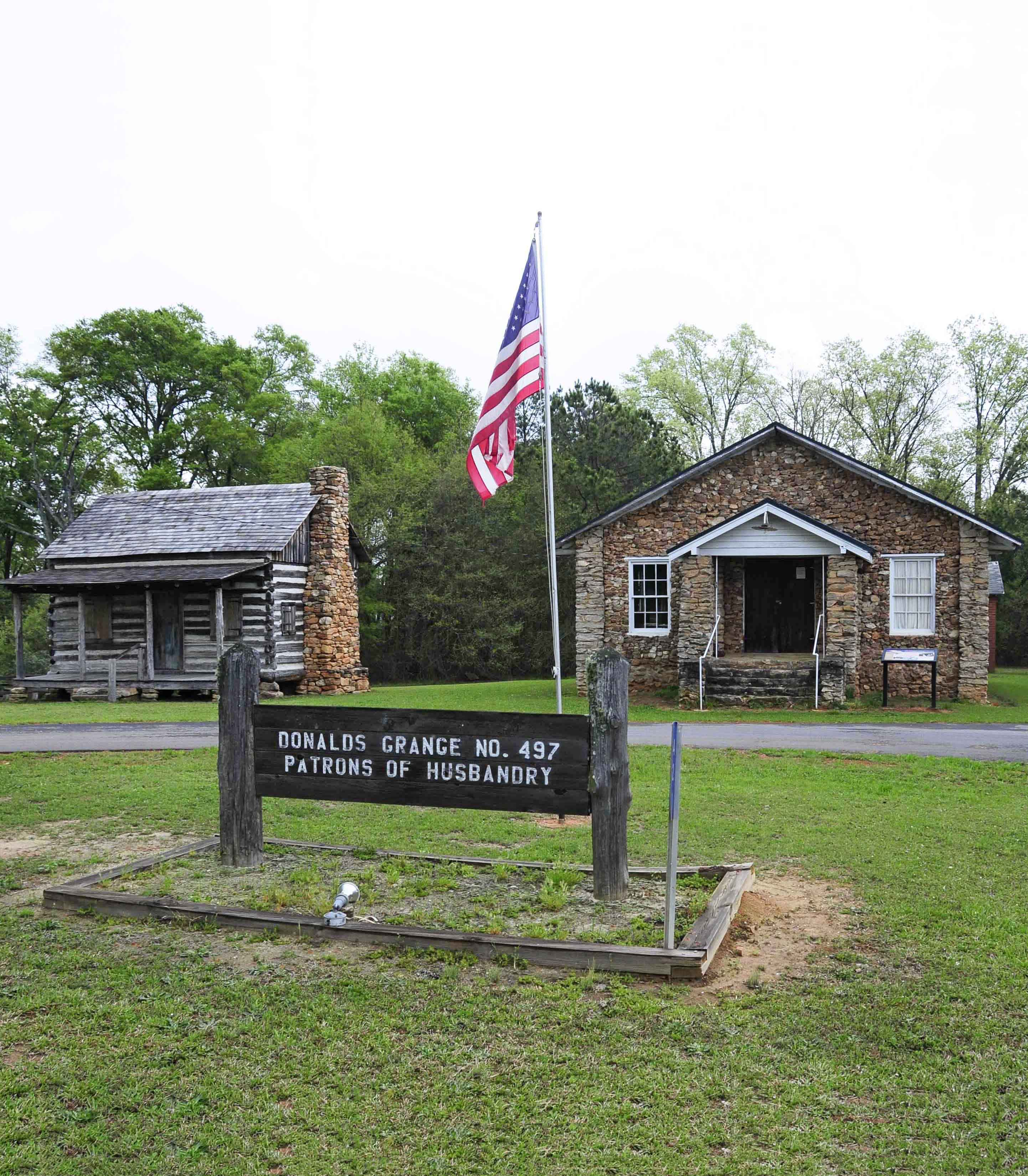

- Location within South Carolina Location within the United States
- Location: SC 184, Donalds, South Carolina
- Coordinates: 34°22′6″N 82°21′7″W
- Area: less than one acre
- Built: 1935
- NRHP reference No.: 94001564
- Added to NRHP: January 9, 1995

The Donalds Grange No. 497, in Donalds, South Carolina, also known as Patrons of Husbandry or Grange Hall, was built in 1935. It has served as a library, as a city hall, and as a meeting hall. It was listed on the National Register of Historic Places in 1995.
