= Abbeville County, South Carolina =

County in South Carolina, United States

- County
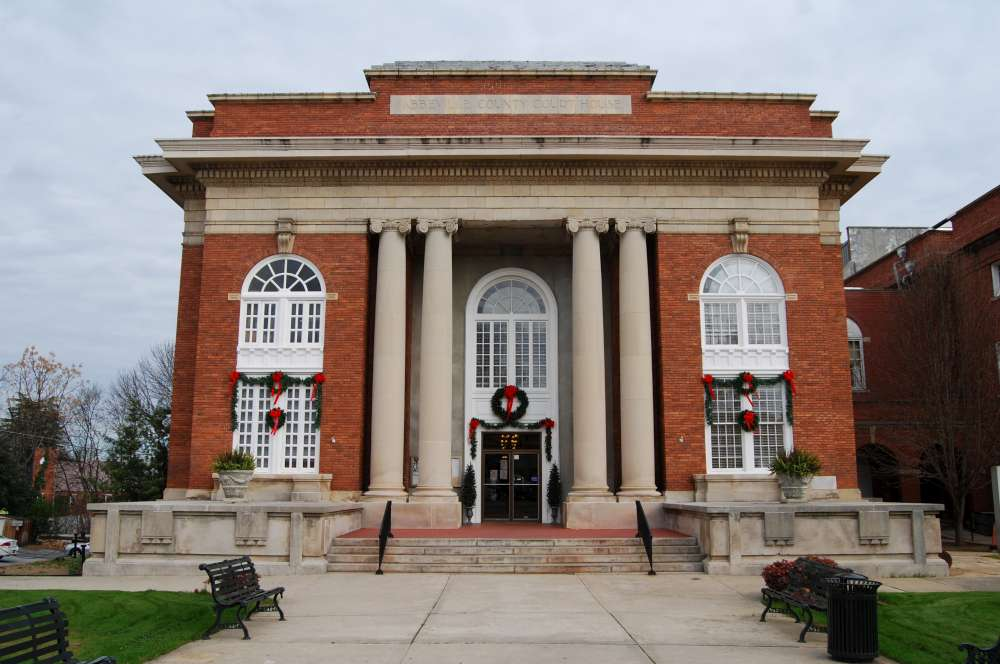
- Abbeville County Courthouse

- Seal
- Motto: "A Great Place to Live."
- Location within the U.S. state of South Carolina
- Coordinates: 34.23°N 82.45°W
- Country: United States
- State: South Carolina
- Founded: 1785
- Named for: Abbeville, France
- Seat: Abbeville
- Largest community: Abbeville

Area
  - Total: 511.74 sq mi (1,325.4 km^{2})
  - Land: 491.19 sq mi (1,272.2 km^{2})
  - Water: 20.55 sq mi (53.2 km^{2}) 4.02%

Population (2020)
  - Total: 24,295
  - Estimate (2025): 24,836 ▲
  - Density: 49.462/sq mi (19.097/km^{2})
- Time zone: UTC−5 (Eastern)
  - Summer (DST): UTC−4 (EDT)
- Congressional district: 3rd
- Website: www.abbevillecountysc.com

Abbeville County is a county located in the U.S. state of South Carolina. As of the 2020 census, its population was 24,295. Its county seat is Abbeville. It is the first county (or county equivalent) in the United States alphabetically. Abbeville County is included in the Greenville-Spartanburg-Anderson, SC Combined Statistical Area, known colloquially as the Upstate or the Upcountry.

== History ==
Both Abbeville County and the county seat, Abbeville, get their name from the town of Abbeville, France, the native home of an early settler. The county was originally part of Ninety-Six District, South Carolina, but was designated Abbeville County in 1785, with parts of the county later going to the creation of the counties of Greenwood and McCormick. Abbeville County was settled by mostly Scotch Irish and French-Huguenot farmers in the mid-18th century.

The Treaty of Dewitt's Corner, a historic peace negotiation with the Cherokee Indians, was signed in Dewitt's Corner (which is now known as Due West) in the county. As a result of the treaty, the Cherokee tribe broke into two factions, one of which, the Chickamauga Cherokee, continued fighting area settlers for another 30 years.

Abbeville County was a hotbed of secession before the Civil War and was also where the last Confederate council of war was held.

In 1950 Abbeville County had a population of 22,456. As of the 2020 census, this has grown to 24,295 people.

=== Lynchings ===
There were nine documented lynchings in Abbeville, SC.

1. Dave Roberts known as "David Roberts","Robert Dane", 1882.
2. Tut Danford, 1889.
3. Jake "Jacob" Davis, August 21, 1893.
4. Will Lawton, December 6, 1893.
5. James A. Nelson known as "James Macon","James Mason", 1894.
6. Allen Pendleton, 1905.
7. Will Lozier, 1915.
8. Anthony Crawford, a prominent landowner, farmer, businessman lynched for not selling his cotton at the price demanded. 1916.
9. Mark "Max" Smith, 1919.

== Geography ==
Interactive map of Abbeville County

According to the U.S. Census Bureau, the county has a total area of 511.74 square miles (1,325.4 km^{2}), of which 491.19 square miles (1,272.2 km^{2}) is land and 20.55 square miles (53.2 km^{2}) (4.02%) is water. Abbeville County is in the Savannah River basin and the Saluda River basin.

=== National protected area ===
- Sumter National Forest (part)

=== State and local protected areas/sites ===
- Calhoun Falls State Park
- Cedar Springs Historic District
- Long Cane Scenic Area
- McCalla Wildlife Management Area

=== Major water bodies ===
- Lake Russell
- Saluda River
- Savannah River
- Lake Secession

=== Adjacent counties ===
- Greenville County – north
- Anderson County – north
- Laurens County – northeast
- Greenwood County – east
- McCormick County – southeast
- Elbert County, Georgia – west

=== Major highways ===
- US 25 Bus.
- US 178
- SC 20
- SC 20 Conn.
- SC 28
- SC 28 Conn.
- SC 71
- SC 71 Truck
- SC 72
- SC 81
- SC 184
- SC 185
- SC 203
- SC 203 Truck
- SC 284

== Demographics ==
Historical population
Census	Pop.	Note	%±
1790	9,197		—
1800	13,553		47.4%
1810	21,156		56.1%
1820	23,167		9.5%
1830	28,149		21.5%
1840	29,351		4.3%
1850	32,318		10.1%
1860	32,385		0.2%
1870	31,129		−3.9%
1880	40,815		31.1%
1890	46,854		14.8%
1900	33,400		−28.7%
1910	34,804		4.2%
1920	27,139		−22.0%
1930	23,323		−14.1%
1940	22,931		−1.7%
1950	22,456		−2.1%
1960	21,417		−4.6%
1970	21,112		−1.4%
1980	22,627		7.2%
1990	23,862		5.5%
2000	26,167		9.7%
2010	25,417		−2.9%
2020	24,295		−4.4%
2025 (est.)	24,836	▲	2.2%
U.S. Decennial Census; 1790–1960 1900–1990; 1990–2000 2010 2020

=== Racial and ethnic composition ===
Abbeville County, South Carolina – Racial and ethnic composition Note: the US Census treats Hispanic/Latino as an ethnic category. This table excludes Latinos from the racial categories and assigns them to a separate category. Hispanics/Latinos may be of any race.
Race / Ethnicity (NH = Non-Hispanic)	Pop 1980	Pop 1990	Pop 2000	Pop 2010	Pop 2020	% 1980	% 1990	% 2000	% 2010	% 2020
White alone (NH)	15,043	16,195	17,797	17,564	16,744	66.48%	67.87%	68.01%	69.10%	68.92%
Black or African American alone (NH)	7,358	7,499	7,879	7,160	6,184	32.52%	31.43%	30.11%	28.17%	25.45%
Native American or Alaska Native alone (NH)	14	17	27	59	44	0.06%	0.07%	0.10%	0.23%	0.18%
Asian alone (NH)	35	50	59	75	71	0.15%	0.21%	0.23%	0.30%	0.29%
Native Hawaiian or Pacific Islander alone (NH)	x	x	5	5	7	x	x	0.02%	0.02%	0.03%
Other race alone (NH)	0	3	30	23	70	0.00%	0.01%	0.11%	0.09%	0.29%
Mixed race or Multiracial (NH)	x	x	153	276	752	x	x	0.58%	1.09%	3.10%
Hispanic or Latino (any race)	177	98	217	255	423	0.78%	0.41%	0.83%	1.00%	1.74%
Total	22,627	23,862	26,167	25,417	24,295	100.00%	100.00%	100.00%	100.00%	100.00%

=== 2020 census ===
As of the 2020 census, the county had a population of 24,295, 9,818 households, and 6,248 families residing in the county. The median age was 45.0 years, with 20.3% of residents under the age of 18 and 22.6% of residents 65 years of age or older. For every 100 females there were 94.2 males, and for every 100 females age 18 and over there were 91.7 males age 18 and over.

The 2020 PL data (see table) show the population remained predominantly White, with a large Black or African American minority and smaller American Indian and Alaska Native, Asian, Pacific Islander, and Hispanic or Latino communities.

Twenty-one percent of residents lived in urban areas and 79.0% lived in rural areas.

Of those households, 28.1% had children under the age of 18 living with them and 30.5% had a female householder with no spouse or partner present. About 28.7% of all households were made up of individuals, and 14.0% had someone living alone who was 65 years of age or older. There were 11,540 housing units, of which 14.9% were vacant. Among occupied housing units, 77.2% were owner-occupied and 22.8% were renter-occupied, with the homeowner vacancy rate at 1.3% and the rental vacancy rate at 7.2%.

=== 2010 census ===
At the 2010 census, there were 25,417 people, 9,990 households, and 6,939 families living in the county. The population density was 51.8 inhabitants per square mile (20.0/km^{2}). There were 12,079 housing units at an average density of 24.6 units per square mile (9.5 units/km^{2}). The racial makeup of the county was 69.6% white, 28.3% black or African American, 0.3% Asian, 0.2% American Indian, 0.4% from other races, and 1.1% from two or more races. Those of Hispanic or Latino origin made up 1.0% of the population. In terms of ancestry, 14.7% were American, 10.9% were Irish, 9.7% were English, 7.6% were German, and 5.6% were Scotch-Irish.

Of the 9,990 households, 31.5% had children under the age of 18 living with them, 49.2% were married couples living together, 15.3% had a female householder with no husband present, 30.5% were non-families, and 27.3% of all households were made up of individuals. The average household size was 2.45 and the average family size was 2.98. The median age was 41.6 years.

The median income for a household in the county was $33,143 and the median income for a family was $45,147. Males had a median income of $39,217 versus $29,199 for females. The per capita income for the county was $16,653. About 16.3% of families and 20.7% of the population were below the poverty line, including 26.8% of those under age 18 and 16.2% of those age 65 or over.

=== 2000 census ===
At the 2000 census, there were 26,167 people, 10,131 households, and 7,284 families living in the county. The population density was 52 people per square mile (20 people/km^{2}). There were 11,656 housing units at an average density of 23 units per square mile (8.9 units/km^{2}). The racial makeup of the county was 68.33% White, 30.29% Black or African American, 0.10% Native American, 0.23% Asian, 0.03% Pacific Islander, 0.31% from other races, and 0.71% from two or more races. 0.83% of the population were Hispanic or Latino of any race. 22.1% were of American, 9.7% Irish, 6.7% English, 5.5% German and 5.3% Scotch-Irish ancestry according to Census 2000.

There were 10,131 households, out of which 31.70% had children under the age of 18 living with them, 52.20% were married couples living together, 15.30% had a female householder with no husband present, and 28.10% were non-families. 25.30% of all households were made up of individuals, and 11.30% had someone living alone who was 65 years of age or older. The average household size was 2.51 and the average family size was 3.00.

In the county, the population was spread out, with 25.30% under the age of 18, 9.50% from 18 to 24, 26.70% from 25 to 44, 23.80% from 45 to 64, and 14.70% who were 65 years of age or older. The median age was 37 years. For every 100 females there were 92.10 males. For every 100 females age 18 and over, there were 88.00 males.

The median income for a household in the county was $32,635, and the median income for a family was $38,847. Males had a median income of $30,452 versus $21,045 for females. The per capita income for the county was $15,370. About 10.10% of families and 13.70% of the population were below the poverty line, including 17.20% of those under age 18 and 16.90% of those age 65 or over.

== Law and government ==
William C. Norris is the chairman of the Abbeville County Council, who also represents district 4. The other members and their districts are as following:

- Brandon Johnson – district 1
- Christine Long – district 2
- Charles Goodwin – district 3
- James McCord – district 5
- Rick Campbell – district 6
- Bryan McClain – district 7

=== Law enforcement ===
In 2013, long-time Abbeville County Sheriff Charles Goodwin pled guilty to misconduct in office. He was put on probation for five years, sentenced to 100 hours of community service, and ordered to pay $4,500 in restitution.

=== Politics ===
Abbeville County was a typical "Solid South" county in its voting patterns until 1948 when it voted for Dixiecrat candidate and South Carolina native Strom Thurmond against Democratic candidate Harry Truman regarding his support for Civil Rights, most importantly racial integration. It resumed voting Democratic until 1968 when a majority voted for American Independent Party candidate & southern segregationist George Wallace. In 1972 the county voted overwhelmingly for Richard Nixon, and since then Abbeville has showed strong endorsement towards the Republican Party. The last Democrat to carry Abbeville County was Bill Clinton in 1992 and 1996.

United States presidential election results for Abbeville County, South Carolina
Year	Republican		Democratic		Third party(ies)	
Year	No.	%	No.	%	No.	%
1900	8	0.58%	1,366	99.42%	0	0.00%
1904	21	3.06%	665	96.94%	0	0.00%
1912	9	0.81%	1,095	98.83%	4	0.36%
1916	8	0.88%	900	98.79%	3	0.33%
1920	13	1.48%	868	98.52%	0	0.00%
1924	19	2.58%	681	92.40%	37	5.02%
1928	65	5.99%	1,020	94.01%	0	0.00%
1932	9	0.75%	1,184	99.16%	1	0.08%
1936	23	1.79%	1,265	98.21%	0	0.00%
1940	32	3.08%	1,007	96.92%	0	0.00%
1944	19	2.32%	789	96.34%	11	1.34%
1948	23	2.16%	254	23.87%	787	73.97%
1952	970	25.89%	2,776	74.11%	0	0.00%
1956	339	9.47%	2,985	83.36%	257	7.18%
1960	845	21.62%	3,064	78.38%	0	0.00%
1964	1,448	35.00%	2,689	65.00%	0	0.00%
1968	1,213	20.77%	1,425	24.40%	3,201	54.82%
1972	3,266	68.95%	1,349	28.48%	122	2.58%
1976	1,791	27.46%	4,700	72.06%	31	0.48%
1980	2,361	35.60%	4,049	61.05%	222	3.35%
1984	3,798	55.24%	3,051	44.38%	26	0.38%
1988	3,738	50.51%	3,629	49.03%	34	0.46%
1992	3,317	39.76%	3,968	47.56%	1,058	12.68%
1996	3,054	43.01%	3,493	49.20%	553	7.79%
2000	4,450	53.14%	3,766	44.97%	158	1.89%
2004	5,436	54.77%	4,389	44.22%	100	1.01%
2008	6,264	56.94%	4,593	41.75%	144	1.31%
2012	5,981	56.05%	4,543	42.57%	147	1.38%
2016	6,763	62.77%	3,741	34.72%	271	2.52%
2020	8,215	66.07%	4,101	32.98%	117	0.94%
2024	8,509	70.63%	3,399	28.21%	140	1.16%

== Economy ==
In 1999, Abbeville County had the highest level of economic development and job creation per capita in all of South Carolina. Factors contributing to Abbeville's economic growth include some of the lowest electricity operating costs in South Carolina and the broader southeastern region of the United States, right-to-work laws forcing the cost of labor down, and direct workforce training through the Piedmont Technical College.

Throughout 2023 and early 2024, the unemployment rate of Abbeville has fluctuated around 4%. In 2022, the GDP of Abbeville County was $666.9 million (roughly $27,450 per capita). In chained 2017 dollars, its per-capita real GDP was $22,685. According to the Bureau of Labor Statistics, Abbeville has 417 employment establishments (private and public organizations covered by unemployment insurance). As of Q3 2023, some of the top 20 employers in the state include the city of Abbeville, Erskine College, Hardee's, Ingles, Prysmian Group, Sage Automotive Interiors, and Wayfair.

Employment and Wage Statistics by Industry in Abbeville County, South Carolina
Industry	Employment Counts	Employment Percentage (%)	Average Annual Wage ($)
Accommodation and Food Services	337	6.5	16,380
Administrative and Support and Waste Management and Remediation Services	223	4.3	35,880
Agriculture, Forestry, Fishing and Hunting	35	0.7	31,200
Construction	127	2.4	46,800
Educational Services	683	13.1	41,028
Finance and Insurance	75	1.4	49,504
Health Care and Social Assistance	484	9.3	59,072
Information	122	2.3	78,000
Manufacturing	1,784	34.3	62,036
Other Services (except Public Administration)	96	1.8	35,724
Professional, Scientific, and Technical Services	111	2.1	101,660
Public Administration	478	9.2	42,588
Real Estate and Rental and Leasing	14	0.3	36,504
Retail Trade	439	8.4	21,788
Transportation and Warehousing	65	1.3	55,380
Utilities	47	0.9	80,860
Wholesale Trade	77	1.5	62,660
Total	5,197	100.0%	49,729

== Education ==
=== School districts ===
There are two school districts in the county: Abbeville County School District takes up the majority of the area, while some parts are in the Greenwood School District 51. Most Abbeville County schools are part of the Abbeville County School District. The following schools are within the district:

- Abbeville County Adult Education
- Abbeville High School (grades 9–12)
- Abbeville County Career Center (supplementary career education - grades 10–12)
- Cherokee Trail Elementary (grades K–6)
- Diamond Hill Elementary (grades K–6)
- Dixie High School (grades 7–12)
- John C. Calhoun Elementary (grades K-5)
- Long Cane Primary (grades K–2)
- Westwood Elementary (grades 3–5)
- Wright Middle School (grades 6–8)

=== Other schools ===
- Calhoun Falls Charter School (part of the South Carolina Public Charter School District, whereby students from any part of the state may attend)

=== Colleges and universities ===
- Erskine College, a four-year Christian liberal arts college, with 575 undergraduates, is located in Due West, South Carolina
- Piedmont Technical College, hosts a branch campus in Abbeville, SC

== Communities ==
=== City ===
- Abbeville (county seat and largest community)

=== Towns ===
- Calhoun Falls
- Donalds
- Due West
- Honea Path (mostly in Anderson County)
- Lowndesville
- Ware Shoals (mostly in Greenwood County; partly in Laurens County)

=== Census-designated places ===
- Antreville
- Lake Secession

== Notable people ==
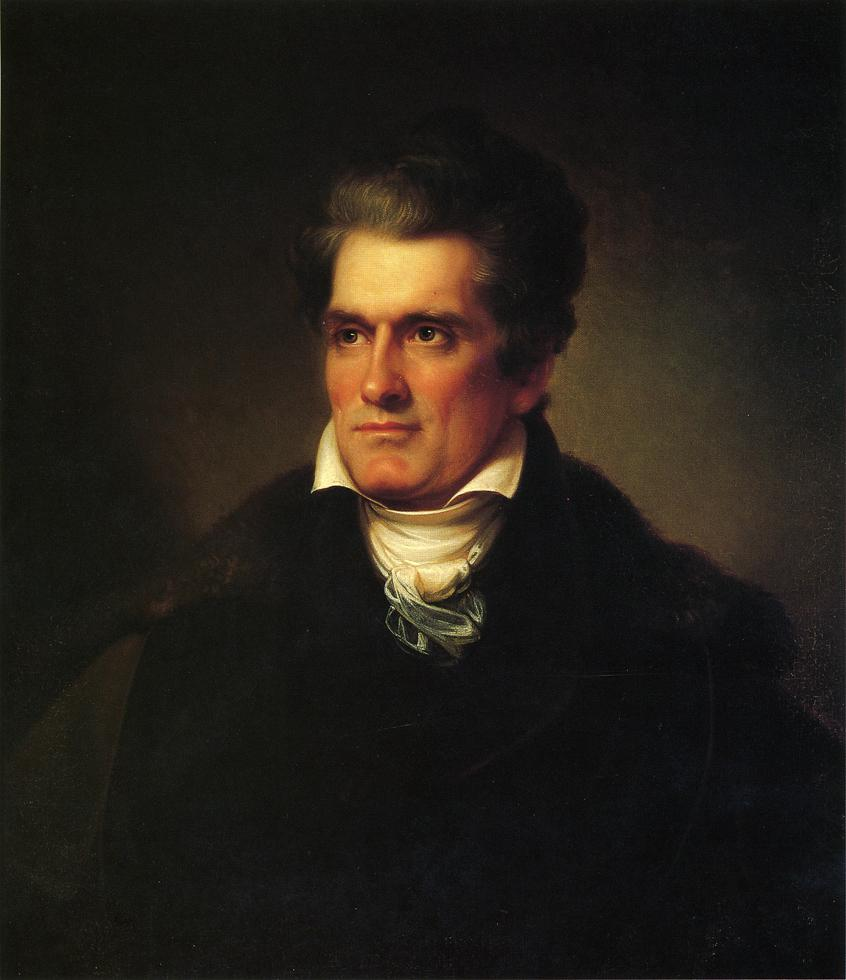
Portrait of John C. Calhoun, famous politician from Abbeville County.

- John C. Calhoun (1782–1850), born in the Abbeville District, U.S. congressman and U.S. senator from South Carolina, secretary of war, secretary of state, and vice president of the United States
- Langdon Cheves (1776–1857), born in Abbeville County at Rocky River, banker and U.S. congressman from South Carolina
- Anthony Crawford (c. 1865–1916), prominent landowner, farmer, and businessman who was lynched for not selling his cotton at the price demanded
- Francis Alanson Cunningham (1804–1864), born in the Abbeville District, physician and United States Congressman from Ohio
- Leomont Evans (born 1974), former American football player in the NFL and the first iteration of the XFL
- Joshua Hill (1812–1891), born in the Abbeville District, U.S. senator from Georgia
- Thomas D. Howie (1908–1944), American army officer, killed during the Battle of Normandy during World War II, while trying to capture the French town of Saint-Lô. He is known as "The Major of St. Lo"
- Abner Smith Lipscomb (1816–1890), born in the Abbeville District, member of the Alabama Legislature and Supreme Court Justice of both Alabama and Texas
- James L. Petigru (1789–1863), born in the Abbeville District, was the attorney general of South Carolina and a member of the South Carolina House of Representatives. He was the leader of the anti-nullificationalists in the state house

== See also ==
- List of counties in South Carolina
- National Register of Historic Places listings in Abbeville County, South Carolina
