= Piedmont Technical College =

College in Greenwood, South Carolina, US

Coordinates: 34.2062747°N 82.1217174°W

- Motto: Porta ad successum
- Motto in English: Gateway to success
- Type: Public community college
- Established: 1966
- Parent institution: South Carolina Technical College System
- President: Hope Rivers
- Location: Greenwood, South Carolina, United States
- Website: www.ptc.edu

Piedmont Technical College is a public community college with its main campus in Greenwood, South Carolina. It serves seven counties in the Lakelands region of South Carolina. Six additional County Centers also serve students in Abbeville County, Edgefield County, Laurens County, McCormick County, Newberry County, and Saluda County. Piedmont Technical College serves the largest geographic area of any institution in the South Carolina Technical College System. The college was founded in 1966.

== Campuses ==
- Lex Walters Campus (Greenwood, SC)
- Abbeville County Center (Abbeville, SC)
- Edgefield County Center (Edgefield, SC)
- Laurens County Higher Education Center (Clinton, SC)
- McCormick County Center (McCormick, SC)
- Newberry County Center (Newberry, SC)
- Saluda County Center (Saluda, SC)
