= Cedar Springs Historic District =

Historic church in South Carolina, United States

- U.S. National Register of Historic Places
- U.S. Historic district
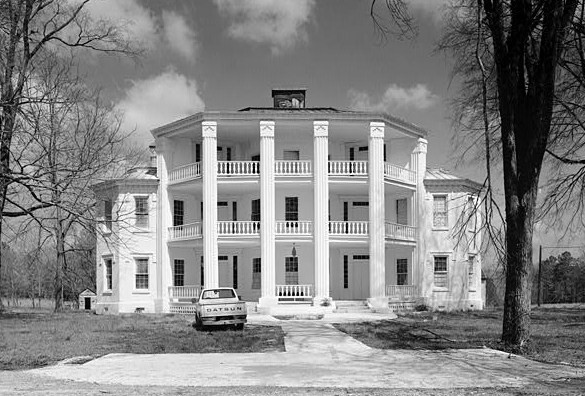
- Frazier-Pressley House

- Location within South Carolina Location within the United States
- Nearest city: Abbeville, South Carolina
- Coordinates: 34°4′50″N 82°18′8″W
- Built: 1820
- Architectural style: Octagon Mode
- NRHP reference No.: 82003824
- Added to NRHP: March 25, 1982

Cedar Springs Historic District is a historic district in Abbeville and Greenwood Counties in South Carolina. It has three contributing properties. It is located at the intersection of Abbeville County Road 33, Greenwood County Road 112, and Greenwood County Road 47. The buildings were built between 1820 and 1856.

== Stagecoach Inn ==
Stagecoach Inn is a two-story log building that was built around 1820. The building has a gabled, standing-seam metal roof. The porch along the original facade has been enclosed. This building has been altered. Its log walls are covered with shiplap siding. It is believed to have been a stop on a stagecoach line.

== Frazier-Pressley House ==
The Frazier-Pressley House is a three-story, stuccoed brick building. It is believed that it was built for Captain James W. Frazier in 1852 to 1856. The house has three octagonal elements joined with a connecting hallway. There is a two-story, brick extension to the rear. The facade has four three-story brick columns. The house has five brick chimneys. It originally had a widow's walk on the top of the central octagon. The house has eleven major rooms. Each of the floors of each octagon is a single room. The plan of the house is believed to be unique in the United States.

== Cedar Springs ARP Church ==
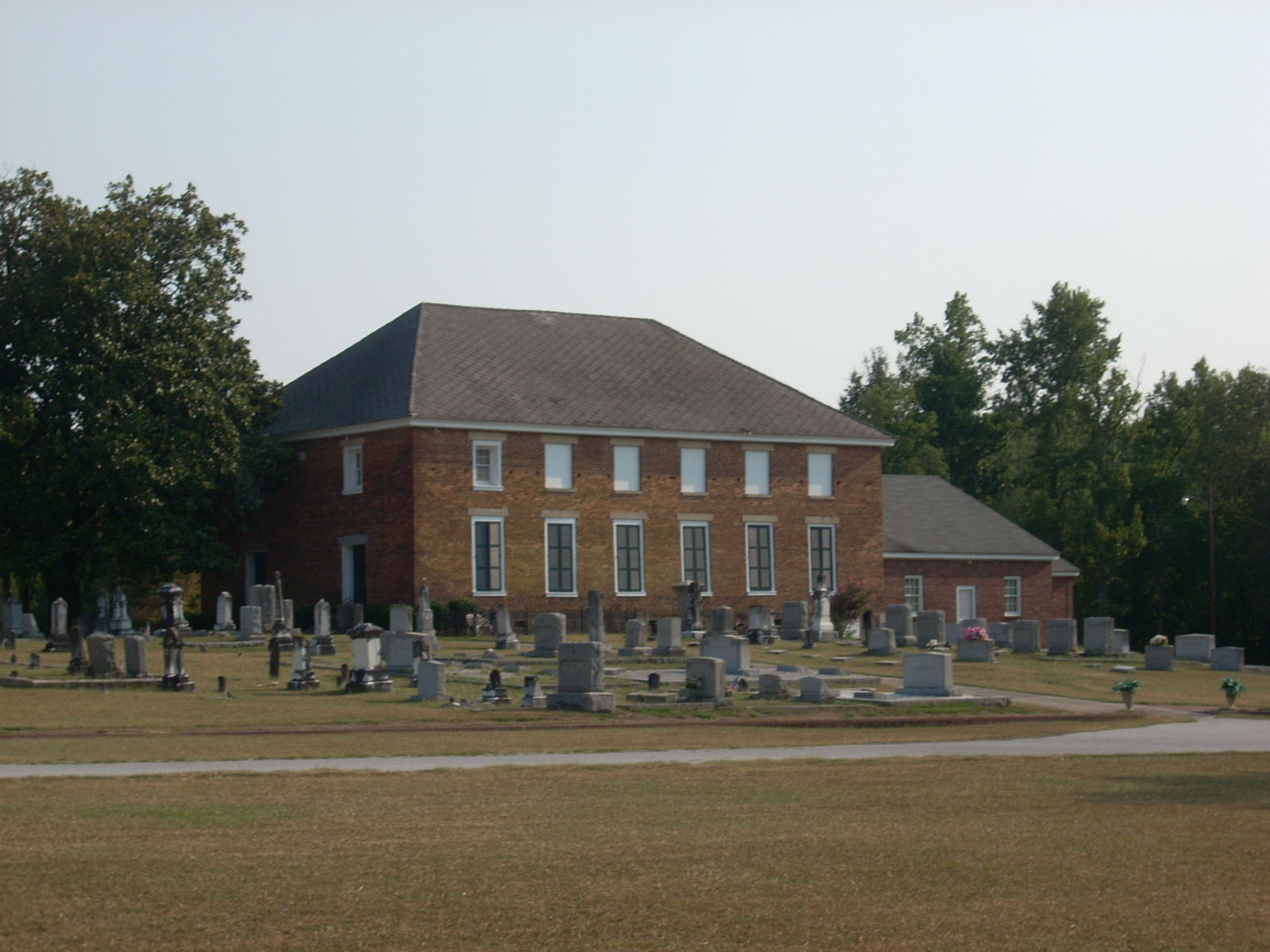
Cedar Springs ARP Church

Cedar Springs ARP Church is a rectangular, brick church with hip roof. The brickwork is common bond with bonding every sixth course. The foundation is stone. This church was built circa 1853 to replace an earlier framed church. A single story, brick wing was added in the 1940s to the rear of the church. The church cemetery is adjacent to the church.
