= Donalds, South Carolina =

- Town
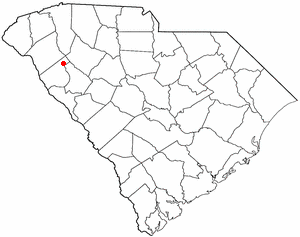
- Location of Donalds, South Carolina
- Coordinates: 34°22′28″N 82°20′48″W
- Country: United States
- State: South Carolina
- County: Abbeville

Area
  - Total: 0.84 sq mi (2.17 km^{2})
  - Land: 0.83 sq mi (2.15 km^{2})
  - Water: 0.0039 sq mi (0.01 km^{2})
- Elevation: 758 ft (231 m)

Population (2020)
  - Total: 328
  - Density: 394.4/sq mi (152.27/km^{2})
- Time zone: UTC-5 (Eastern (EST))
  - Summer (DST): UTC-4 (EDT)
- ZIP code: 29638
- Area codes: 864, 821
- FIPS code: 45-19870
- GNIS feature ID: 2406385
- Website: townofdonalds.com

Donalds is a town in Abbeville County, South Carolina. As of the 2020 United States Census, its population was 328.

== History ==
Donalds Grange No. 497 and Greenville Presbyterian Church are listed on the National Register of Historic Places.

== Geography ==
According to the United States Census Bureau, the town has a total area of 0.85 square miles (2.2 km^{2}), of which 0.0039 square miles (0.01 km^{2}), or 0.66%, is water.

== Demographics ==
Historical population
Census	Pop.	Note	%±
1890	216		—
1900	229		6.0%
1910	268		17.0%
1920	310		15.7%
1930	220		−29.0%
1940	271		23.2%
1950	332		22.5%
1960	416		25.3%
1970	392		−5.8%
1980	366		−6.6%
1990	326		−10.9%
2000	354		8.6%
2010	348		−1.7%
2020	328		−5.7%
2022 (est.)	321	▼	−2.1%
U.S. Decennial Census

As of the census of 2000, there were 354 people, 134 households, and 95 families residing in the town. The population density was 422.9 people per square mile (163.3 people/km^{2}). There were 152 housing units at an average density of 181.6 per square mile (70.1/km^{2}). The racial makeup of the town was 83.62% White, 14.97% African American, 0.28% Pacific Islander, and 1.13% from two or more races. Hispanic or Latino of any race were 1.98% of the population.

There were 134 households, out of which 32.8% had children under the age of 18 living with them, 50.0% were married couples living together, 15.7% had a female householder with no husband present, and 29.1% were non-families. 26.9% of all households were made up of individuals, and 11.9% had someone living alone who was 65 years of age or older. The average household size was 2.64 and the average family size was 3.22.

In the town, the population was spread out, with 27.4% under the age of 18, 7.1% from 18 to 24, 33.6% from 25 to 44, 16.1% from 45 to 64, and 15.8% who were 65 years of age or older. The median age was 34 years. For every 100 females, there were 90.3 males. For every 100 females age 18 and over, there were 81.0 males.

The median income for a household in the town was $32,083, and the median income for a family was $35,417. Males had a median income of $32,045 versus $17,321 for females. The per capita income for the town was $14,333. About 9.0% of families and 12.0% of the population were below the poverty line, including 18.1% of those under age 18 and none of those age 65 or over.

== Economy ==
Donalds economy is mainly agricultural based economy though there are two wood mills in town East Teak Fine Hardwoods and Clendenin Lumber a subsidiary of Baillie Lumber Co.

A branch of the Commercial Bank is located in the town's city limits.

== Education ==
It is in the Abbeville County School District.

Donalds has a public library, a branch of the Abbeville County Library System.

== Notable person ==
Casey Ashley professional fisherman; winner of 2015 Bassmaster Classic
