= Abbeville High School (South Carolina) =

Location
- 701 Washington Street; Abbeville, South Carolina 29620; United States; 34°11′15″N 82°22′29″W

Information
- Type: Public
- School district: Abbeville County School District
- CEEB code: 410000
- Principal: Scott White
- Grades: 9–12
- Enrollment: 427 (2023-2024)
- Colors: Garnet and gold
- Mascot: Panthers
- Website: School website

Abbeville High School is a high school for grades 9–12 in Abbeville, South Carolina. It is part of the Abbeville County School District.

As of 2024, US News ranks Abbeville High School as 132nd within schools in South Carolina. The school is majority racial minority (54%), with 74% of students classified as economically disadvantaged.

== Athletics ==
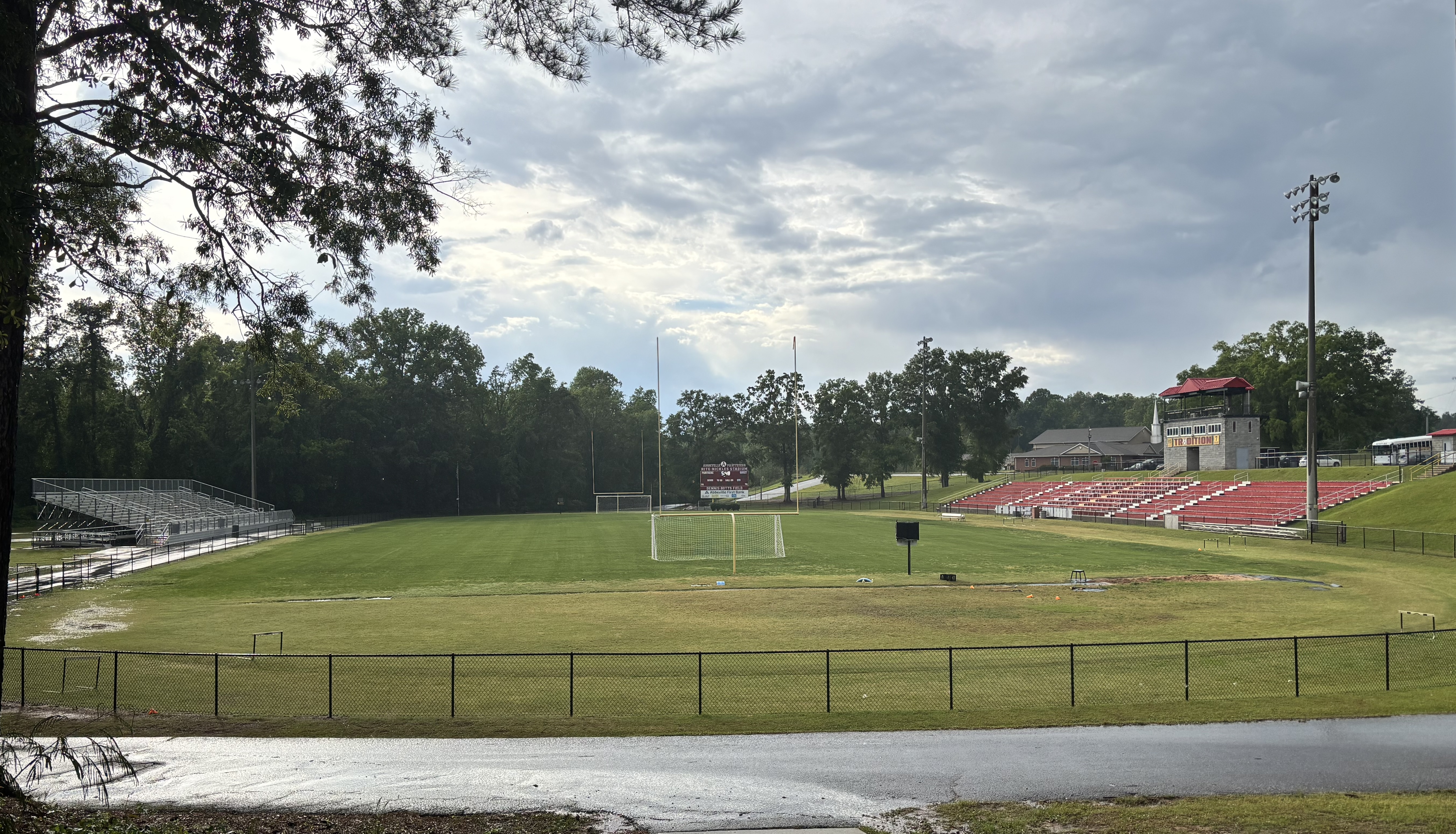
Hite-Nickles Stadium arranged for a soccer game (pictured 2025)

Abbeville High School participates in 12 varsity sports throughout the year. Football, baseball, boys' and girls' basketball, and softball participate in junior varsity programs.

Fall	Winter	Spring
Cross country	Boys' basketball	Baseball
Football	Girls' basketball	Golf
Tennis	Wrestling	Soccer
Volleyball		Softball
		Track

=== State championships ===
- Basketball - Boys: 2016
- Football: 1971, 1981, 1991, 1996, 2010, 2011, 2015, 2016, 2017, 2018, 2020, 2022, 2024
- Softball: 2011
- Track - Boys: 1978, 1996, 1997

== Notable alumni ==
- Leomont Evans — former National Football League (NFL) player for the Washington Redskins (1996–1999)
- Kennan Gilchrist — former Canadian Football League (CFL) player for the Toronto Argonauts (2019)
- Kenneth Moton — co-anchor of World News Now and America This Morning
- Charlie Timmons — former National Football League (NFL) player for the Brooklyn Dodgers (1946)

== See also ==
- List of high schools in South Carolina
