= Craytonville, South Carolina =

Craytonville Crayton
- Unincorporated community
- Location within South Carolina Location within the United States
- Coordinates: 34°26′10″N 82°28′58″W
- Country: United States
- State: South Carolina
- County: Anderson
- Elevation: 810 ft (250 m)
- Time zone: UTC-5 (Eastern (EST))
  - Summer (DST): UTC-4 (EDT)
- Area codes: 864, 821
- GNIS feature ID: 1247421

Craytonville (also Crayton) is an unincorporated community in Anderson County, South Carolina.

James Lawrence Orr (1822–1873), politician, diplomat, judge, and lawyer, was born in Craytonville.
