= Hodges, South Carolina =

- Town
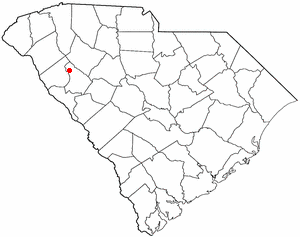
- Location of Hodges, South Carolina
- Coordinates: 34°17′15″N 82°15′02″W
- Country: United States
- State: South Carolina
- County: Greenwood

Area
  - Total: 0.78 sq mi (2.03 km^{2})
  - Land: 0.78 sq mi (2.02 km^{2})
  - Water: 0.0039 sq mi (0.01 km^{2})
- Elevation: 702 ft (214 m)

Population (2020)
  - Total: 162
  - Density: 207.6/sq mi (80.14/km^{2})
- Time zone: UTC-5 (Eastern (EST))
  - Summer (DST): UTC-4 (EDT)
- ZIP codes: 29653, 29695
- Area codes: 864, 821
- FIPS code: 45-34225
- GNIS feature ID: 2405847
- Website: www.facebook.com/townofhodges/

Hodges is a town in Greenwood County, South Carolina, United States. As of the 2020 census, Hodges had a population of 162. The mayor is Michael George.

Hodges was named after Major General George Washington Hodges, who was commander of all of South Carolina's militia. Hodges was born September 9, 1792, and died March 24, 1876. He fought in the War of 1812. His grave is northeast of town in a hidden pre-Civil War cemetery.

== Geography ==
Hodges is located in northern Greenwood County. U.S. Route 178 passes through the center of town, leading northwest 34 miles (55 km) to Anderson. U.S. Route 25 passes just east of the town, leading north 44 miles (71 km) to Greenville and south with US 178 8 miles (13 km) to Greenwood.

According to the United States Census Bureau, the town of Hodges has a total area of 0.77 square miles (2.0 km^{2}), of which 1.513 acres (6,124 m^{2}), or 0.30%, are water.

== Demographics ==
Historical population
Census	Pop.	Note	%±
1880	271		—
1890	255		−5.9%
1900	257		0.8%
1910	266		3.5%
1920	284		6.8%
1930	284		0.0%
1940	303		6.7%
1950	275		−9.2%
1960	209		−24.0%
1970	214		2.4%
1980	154		−28.0%
1990	125		−18.8%
2000	158		26.4%
2010	155		−1.9%
2020	162		4.5%
U.S. Decennial Census

As of the census of 2000, there were 158 people, 56 households, and 42 families residing in the town. The population density was 201.8 inhabitants per square mile (77.9/km^{2}). There were 64 housing units at an average density of 81.7 per square mile (31.5/km^{2}). The racial makeup of the town was 88.61% White, 7.59% African American, and 3.80% from two or more races.

There were 56 households, out of which 30.4% had children under the age of 18 living with them, 62.5% were married couples living together, 12.5% had a female householder with no husband present, and 25.0% were non-families. 23.2% of all households were made up of individuals, and 16.1% had someone living alone who was 65 years of age or older. The average household size was 2.82 and the average family size was 3.40.

In the town, the population was spread out, with 25.9% under the age of 18, 7.0% from 18 to 24, 27.2% from 25 to 44, 24.1% from 45 to 64, and 15.8% who were 65 years of age or older. The median age was 39 years. For every 100 females, there were 116.4 males. For every 100 females age 18 and over, there were 105.3 males.

The median income for a household in the town was $41,563, and the median income for a family was $46,875. Males had a median income of $32,083 versus $33,125 for females. The per capita income for the town was $14,564. About 18.6% of families and 15.2% of the population were below the poverty line, including 14.8% of those under the age of eighteen and 15.8% of those 65 or over.

== Education ==
It is in the Greenwood School District 50. The zoned schools are: Hodges Elementary School, Northside Middle School, and Greenwood High School.
