= Calhoun Falls, South Carolina =

- Town
- Nickname: Lil Miami
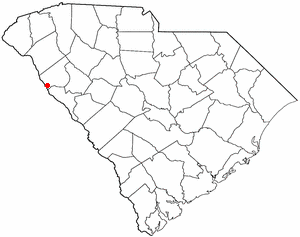
- Location of Calhoun Falls, South Carolina
- Coordinates: 34°05′36″N 82°35′23″W
- Country: United States
- State: South Carolina
- County: Abbeville

Government
  - Type: Council

Area
  - Total: 3.46 sq mi (8.96 km^{2})
  - Land: 3.39 sq mi (8.77 km^{2})
  - Water: 0.073 sq mi (0.19 km^{2})
- Elevation: 525 ft (160 m)

Population (2020)
  - Total: 1,727
  - Density: 509.9/sq mi (196.86/km^{2})
- Time zone: UTC-5 (Eastern (EST))
  - Summer (DST): UTC-4 (EDT)
- ZIP code: 29628
- Area codes: 864, 821
- FIPS code: 45-10720
- GNIS feature ID: 2405364

Calhoun Falls is a town in Abbeville County, South Carolina, United States. The population was 1,724 at the 2020 census, down from 2,004 at the 2010 census.

The town derives its name from James Edward Colhoun (or Calhoun).

== Geography ==
The Calhoun Falls State Recreation Area is located nearby. Lake Richard B. Russell, which straddles the Georgia-South Carolina border, is approximately 3 miles (5 km) west of Calhoun Falls. Calhoun Falls State Park, a South Carolina state park, is within 1 mile (1.6 km); and Bobby Brown State Park, a Georgia state park, is within 5 miles (8 km).

Calhoun Falls is situated at the junction of two major South Carolina state highways: South Carolina Highway 72 and South Carolina Highway 81. The former links the town with Elberton, Georgia, Athens, Georgia, and ultimately Atlanta to the west; and Abbeville, Greenwood, and ultimately metro Charlotte to the east. The latter links the town with Anderson to the north and McCormick to the south. Highway 72 has recently been re-routed around downtown Calhoun Falls as a four-lane 45-mph bypass.

According to the United States Census Bureau, the town has a total area of 3.5 square miles (9.0 km^{2}), of which 3.4 square miles (8.8 km^{2}) is land and 0.077 square miles (0.2 km^{2}), or 2.14%, is water.

=== Climate ===
Climate data for Calhoun Falls, South Carolina (1991–2020)
Month	Jan	Feb	Mar	Apr	May	Jun	Jul	Aug	Sep	Oct	Nov	Dec	Year
Mean daily maximum °F (°C)	54.3 (12.4)	57.9 (14.4)	65.8 (18.8)	74.2 (23.4)	81.3 (27.4)	87.8 (31.0)	91.4 (33.0)	89.7 (32.1)	84.3 (29.1)	74.7 (23.7)	64.6 (18.1)	56.5 (13.6)	73.5 (23.1)
Daily mean °F (°C)	43.3 (6.3)	46.3 (7.9)	53.1 (11.7)	61.4 (16.3)	69.7 (20.9)	77.3 (25.2)	80.9 (27.2)	79.5 (26.4)	73.4 (23.0)	62.6 (17.0)	52.1 (11.2)	45.5 (7.5)	62.1 (16.7)
Mean daily minimum °F (°C)	32.3 (0.2)	34.8 (1.6)	40.4 (4.7)	48.6 (9.2)	58.0 (14.4)	66.7 (19.3)	70.5 (21.4)	69.2 (20.7)	62.6 (17.0)	50.4 (10.2)	39.6 (4.2)	34.4 (1.3)	50.6 (10.4)
Average precipitation inches (mm)	4.08 (104)	4.12 (105)	4.54 (115)	3.13 (80)	3.34 (85)	4.36 (111)	4.16 (106)	4.14 (105)	3.52 (89)	3.27 (83)	3.62 (92)	4.71 (120)	46.99 (1,195)
Average snowfall inches (cm)	0.1 (0.25)	0.3 (0.76)	0.1 (0.25)	0.0 (0.0)	0.0 (0.0)	0.0 (0.0)	0.0 (0.0)	0.0 (0.0)	0.0 (0.0)	0.0 (0.0)	0.0 (0.0)	0.1 (0.25)	0.6 (1.51)
Source: NOAA

== Demographics ==
Historical population
Census	Pop.	Note	%±
1910	296		—
1920	807		172.6%
1930	1,759		118.0%
1940	1,832		4.2%
1950	2,396		30.8%
1960	2,525		5.4%
1970	2,234		−11.5%
1980	2,491		11.5%
1990	2,328		−6.5%
2000	2,303		−1.1%
2010	2,004		−13.0%
2020	1,727		−13.8%
2022 (est.)	1,726	▼	−0.1%
U.S. Decennial Census

=== 2020 census ===
Calhoun Falls racial composition
Race	Num.	Perc.
White (non-Hispanic)	661	38.27%
Black or African American (non-Hispanic)	951	55.07%
Native American	8	0.46%
Asian	4	0.23%
Other/Mixed	70	4.05%
Hispanic or Latino	33	1.91%

As of the 2020 United States census, there were 1,727 people, 742 households, and 417 families residing in the town.

=== 2000 census ===
At the 2000 census, there were 2,303 people, 908 households, and 640 families residing in the town. The population density was 731.9 inhabitants per square mile (282.6/km^{2}). There were 1,042 housing units at an average density of 331.2 per square mile (127.9/km^{2}). The racial makeup of the town was 45.25% White, 52.67% African American, 0.04% Native American, 0.09% Asian, 0.13% Pacific Islander, 0.52% from other races, and 1.30% from two or more races. Hispanic or Latino of any race were 1.74% of the population.

There were 908 households, of which 33.4% had children under the age of 18 living with them, 40.5% were married couples living together, 24.3% had a female householder with no husband present, and 29.5% were non-families. 27.1% of all households were made up of individuals, and 13.0% had someone living alone who was 65 years of age or older. The average household size was 2.52 and the average family size was 3.05.

27.7% of the population were under the age of 18, 8.9% from 18 to 24, 26.8% from 25 to 44, 22.7% from 45 to 64, and 13.9% who were 65 years of age or older. The median age was 36 years. For every 100 females, there were 88.9 males. For every 100 females age 18 and over, there were 83.1 males.

The median household income was $21,728 and the median family income was $30,573. Males had a median income of $26,359 compared with $19,914 for females. The per capita income for the town was $10,412. About 18.4% of families and 23.5% of the population were below the poverty line, including 21.5% of those under age 18 and 34.5% of those age 65 or over.

== Education ==
Calhoun Falls is served by Abbeville County School District. There are two public schools in Calhoun Falls: John C. Calhoun Elementary School and Calhoun Falls Charter School. The latter was founded in 2008. Before this, the only school in town was Calhoun Falls High School, which closed because of budget cuts. Calhoun Falls Charter School was started by the local town leaders and is in the same building as the former Calhoun Falls High School.

Calhoun Falls has a public library, a branch of the Abbeville County Library System.

== Notable people ==
- Kelly Bryant, quarterback for Missouri Tigers
- Martavis Bryant, Washington Commanders wide receiver in the National Football League (NFL)
- Neil Chrisley, Major League Baseball outfielder

== See also ==
- Georgia–Carolina Memorial Bridge
