= Lowndesville, South Carolina =

- Town
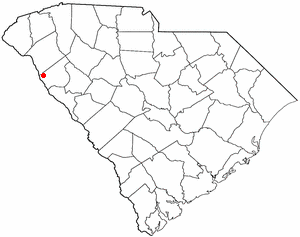
- Location of Lowndesville, South Carolina
- Coordinates: 34°12′36″N 82°38′51″W
- Country: United States
- State: South Carolina
- County: Abbeville

Area
  - Total: 0.78 sq mi (2.01 km^{2})
  - Land: 0.78 sq mi (2.01 km^{2})
  - Water: 0 sq mi (0.00 km^{2})
- Elevation: 587 ft (179 m)

Population (2020)
  - Total: 120
  - Density: 154.9/sq mi (59.82/km^{2})
- Time zone: UTC-5 (Eastern (EST))
  - Summer (DST): UTC-4 (EDT)
- ZIP code: 29659
- Area codes: 864, 821
- FIPS code: 45-42820
- GNIS feature ID: 2406052
- Website: www.facebook.com/LOWNDESVILLE-SOUTH-CAROLINA-181551731876991/

Lowndesville is a town in Abbeville County, South Carolina. The population was 120 at the 2020 census.

== Geography ==
According to the United States Census Bureau, the town has a total area of 0.77 square miles (2.0 km^{2}), all land.

== Demographics ==
Historical population
Census	Pop.	Note	%±
1880	116		—
1890	268		131.0%
1900	241		−10.1%
1910	350		45.2%
1920	350		0.0%
1930	271		−22.6%
1940	201		−25.8%
1950	252		25.4%
1960	274		8.7%
1970	219		−20.1%
1980	197		−10.0%
1990	162		−17.8%
2000	166		2.5%
2010	128		−22.9%
2020	120		−6.2%
2022 (est.)	121	▲	0.8%
U.S. Decennial Census

As of the census of 2000, there were 166 people, 76 households, and 46 families residing in the town. The population density was 214.1 inhabitants per square mile (82.7/km^{2}). There were 124 housing units at an average density of 159.9 per square mile (61.7/km^{2}). The racial makeup of the town was 76.51% White, 20.48% African American, and 3.01% from two or more races.

There were 76 households, out of which 19.7% had children under the age of 18 living with them, 39.5% were married couples living together, 18.4% had a female householder with no husband present, and 38.2% were non-families. 35.5% of all households were made up of individuals, and 15.8% had someone living alone who was 65 years of age or older. The average household size was 2.18 and the average family size was 2.83.

In the town, the population was spread out, with 19.3% under the age of 18, 12.7% from 18 to 24, 21.7% from 25 to 44, 26.5% from 45 to 64, and 19.9% who were 65 years of age or older. The median age was 44 years. For every 100 females, there were 88.6 males. For every 100 females age 18 and over, there were 106.2 males.

The median income for a household in the town was $22,778, and the median income for a family was $24,444. Males had a median income of $22,500 versus $16,250 for females. The per capita income for the town was $11,048. About 22.9% of families and 28.0% of the population were below the poverty line, including 80.0% of those under the age of eighteen and none of those 65 or over.

== Education ==
It is in the Abbeville County School District.
