= Antreville, South Carolina =

- CDP
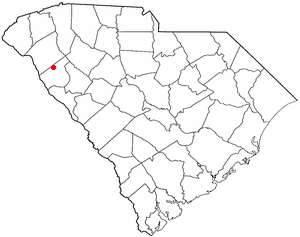
- Location of Antreville, South Carolina
- Coordinates: 34°17′50″N 82°33′15″W
- Country: United States
- State: South Carolina
- County: Abbeville

Area
  - Total: 3.90 sq mi (10.09 km^{2})
  - Land: 3.88 sq mi (10.05 km^{2})
  - Water: 0.015 sq mi (0.04 km^{2})
- Elevation: 682 ft (208 m)

Population (2020)
  - Total: 147
  - Density: 37.9/sq mi (14.63/km^{2})
- Time zone: UTC-5 (Eastern (EST))
  - Summer (DST): UTC-4 (EDT)
- FIPS code: 45-01810
- GNIS feature ID: 2402648

Antreville is a census-designated place (CDP) in Abbeville County, South Carolina. The population was 147 at the 2020 census.

== History ==
The name "Antreville" is a corruption of "Centreville" (a postal error accounts for the error in spelling, which was never corrected).

In 1925, Antreville had 100 inhabitants.

== Geography ==
According to the United States Census Bureau, the CDP has a total area of 3.9 square miles (10.1 km^{2}), of which 0.015 square miles (0.04 km^{2}), or 0.41%, is water.

== Demographics ==
Historical population
Census	Pop.	Note	%±
2010	140		—
2020	147		5.0%
U.S. Decennial Census

As of the census of 2000, there were 118 people, 53 households, and 35 families residing in the CDP. The population density was 30.0 inhabitants per square mile (11.6/km^{2}). There were 61 housing units at an average density of 15.5/sq mi (6.0/km^{2}). The racial makeup of the CDP was 74.58% White, 22.88% African American, 1.69% Native American, and 0.85% from two or more races.

There were 53 households, out of which 26.4% had children under the age of 18 living with them, 50.9% were married couples living together, 13.2% had a female householder with no husband present, and 32.1% were non-families. 30.2% of all households were made up of individuals, and 18.9% had someone living alone who was 65 years of age or older. The average household size was 2.23 and the average family size was 2.78.

In the CDP, the population was spread out, with 23.7% under the age of 18, 4.2% from 18 to 24, 28.8% from 25 to 44, 26.3% from 45 to 64, and 16.9% who were 65 years of age or older. The median age was 37 years. For every 100 females, there were 118.5 males. For every 100 females age 18 and over, there were 95.7 males.

The median income for a household in the CDP was $32,031, and the median income for a family was $40,000. Males had a median income of $23,056 versus $16,797 for females. The per capita income for the CDP was $17,961. There were 15.2% of families and 17.6% of the population living below the poverty line, including 52.2% of under eighteens and none of those over 64.

== Education ==
It is in the Abbeville County School District.
