= American Presbyterian/Reformed Historic Sites Registry =

American Presbyterian/Reformed Historic Sites Registry is a heritage register of sites recognized by the Presbyterian Historical Society.

A list of all sites is provided by the Presbyterian Historical Society.

== List ==
Synod	Presbytery	Site #	Site	City	State	Notes
Alaska-Northwest	Northwest Coast	260	Presbyterian Mission to the Chilkats	Haines	Alaska	
Alaska-Northwest	Northwest Coast	264	Sheldon Jackson College	Sitka	Alaska	Missionary Sheldon Jackson founded this industrial school for Tlingit children in 1878.
Alaska-Northwest	Northwest Coast	230	Whitman Mission National Historic Site	Walla Walla	Washington	Mission established by Marcus and Narcissa Whitman to the Cayuse; site of the first Presbyterian church in the Oregon Territory.
Alaska-Northwest	Inland Northwest	240	Sue McBeth Cabin	Kamiah vicinity 46°12′18″N 116°0′22″W	Idaho	1880-built schoolhouse and home of teacher of future Nez Perce leaders. NRHP-listed. Located near First Indian Presbyterian Church.
Alaska-Northwest	Inland Northwest	241	Lapwai Mission	Spalding	Idaho	Nez Perce related; Reverend Henry H. Spalding and wife Eliza Spalding
Alaska-Northwest	Inland Northwest	242	First Presbyterian Church (Kamiah)	Kamiah vicinity	Idaho	
Alaska-Northwest	Seattle	252	George F. Whitworth Grave	Seattle	Washington	George F. Whitworth
Alaska-Northwest	Yukon	50	United Protestant Church	Palmer	Alaska	
Covenant	Cincinnati	11	Sycamore United Presbyterian Church	Cincinnati	Ohio	
Covenant	Cincinnati	110	Cleves Presbyterian Church	Cleves	Ohio	
Covenant	Cincinnati	115	First Presbyterian Church (West Union, Ohio)	West Union	Ohio	
Covenant	Cincinnati	165	Venice Presbyterian Church	Ross	Ohio	
Covenant	Cincinnati	289	Red Oak Presbyterian Church	Ripley	Ohio	Stone church associated with abolitionist Reverend Gilliland.
Covenant	Cincinnati	348	James Kemper House	Cincinnati	Ohio	"Home of the Reverend James Kemper, first Presbyterian minister ordained in the Northwest Territory, 1792"
Covenant	Cincinnati	382	Bethel Murdoch Presbyterian Church	Loveland	Ohio	
Covenant	Lake Huron	144	First Presbyterian Church (Saginaw, Michigan)	Saginaw	Michigan	
Covenant	Lake Huron	219	First Presbyterian Church of Maple Ridge	Maple Ridge	Michigan	
Covenant	Lake Huron	350	First Presbyterian Church (Beaverton)	Beaverton	Michigan	
Covenant	Lake Michigan	82	First Presbyterian Church (Allegan)	Allegan	Michigan	
Covenant	Lake Michigan	281	First Presbyterian Church	Coldwater	Michigan	
Covenant	Lake Michigan	354	Presbyterian Church of Edwardsburg	Edwardsburg	Michigan	
Covenant	Lake Michigan	368	First Presbyterian Church (Richland)	Richland	Michigan	
Covenant	Maumee Valley	2	First Presbyterian Church (Blissfield, Michigan)	Blissfield	Michigan	
Covenant	Miami	62	First Presbyterian Church (Troy, Ohio)	Troy	Ohio	
Covenant	Miami	183	Honey Creek Presbyterian Church	New Carlisle	Ohio	
Covenant	Miami	185	Seminary Building of the Associate Reformed Presbyterian Church, Oxford	Oxford	Ohio	
Covenant	Miami	215	Lebanon Presbyterian Church	Lebanon	Ohio	
Covenant	Muskingum Valley	113	Coshocton Presbyterian Church	Coshocton	Ohio	
Covenant	Scioto Valley	160	First Presbyterian Church (Washington Court House, Ohio)	Washington Court House; 39.536271°N 83.442073°W	Ohio	
Covenant	Scioto Valley	193	Alexander Presbyterian Church	Athens	Ohio	
Covenant	Scioto Valley	342	Liberty Presbyterian Church	Delaware	Ohio	
Covenant	Scioto Valley	385	Second Presbyterian Church (Newark, Ohio)	Newark	Ohio	
Covenant	Western Reserve	262	Rome United Presbyterian Church	Rome	Ohio	
Lakes and Prairies	Central Nebraska	276	Henry M. Giltner Grave	Aurora	Nebraska	"First Presbyterian minister to serve Nebraska pioneers, 1855".
Lakes and Prairies	Des Moines	103	Scotch Ridge Presbyterian Church	Carlisle	Iowa	
Lakes and Prairies	Des Moines	175	First Reformed Church (Pella, Iowa)	Pella	Iowa	
Lakes and Prairies	East Iowa	63	Union Presbyterian Church (Lost Nation, Iowa)	Lost Nation	Iowa	
Lakes and Prairies	East Iowa	79	West Point Presbyterian Church	West Point	Iowa	
Lakes and Prairies	East Iowa	83	First Presbyterian Church	Muscatine	Iowa	
Lakes and Prairies	East Iowa	358	Union Presbyterian Church (Fort Madison, Iowa)	Fort Madison	Iowa	
Lakes and Prairies	East Iowa	392	Scotch Grove Presbyterian Church	Scotch Grove	Iowa	
Lakes and Prairies	East Iowa	393	Center Junction Presbyterian Church	Center Junction	Iowa	
Lakes and Prairies	East Iowa	399	First Presbyterian Church	Cedar Rapids	Iowa	
Lakes and Prairies	East Iowa	427	Red Oak Grove Presbyterian Church and Cemetery	Tipton	Iowa	
Lakes and Prairies	John Knox	162	First Presbyterian Church	Dubuque	Iowa	
Lakes and Prairies	Milwaukee	66	Yorkville Presbyterian Church	Union Grove	Wisconsin	
Lakes and Prairies	Milwaukee	78	Lisbon United Presbyterian Church	Sussex	Wisconsin	
Lakes and Prairies	Milwaukee	142	First Presbyterian Church of Vernon	Big Bend	Wisconsin	
Lakes and Prairies	Milwaukee	187	First Presbyterian Church	Waukesha	Wisconsin	
Lakes and Prairies	Minnesota Valleys	69	Jerusalem Presbyterian Church	Lake Crystal	Wisconsin	
Lakes and Prairies	Minnesota Valleys	255	Lac qui Parle Mission	Montevideo	Minnesota	"(First mission to the Sioux Indians, established by the Presbyterian Church in 1835)" Lac qui Parle
Lakes and Prairies	North Central Iowa	412	First Presbyterian Church (Jesup, Iowa)	Jesup	Iowa	
Lakes and Prairies	Northern Plains	190	First Presbyterian Church (Jamestown, North Dakota)	Jamestown	North Dakota	
Lakes and Prairies	Northern Waters	125	First Presbyterian Church (Blackduck, Minnesota)	Blackduck	Minnesota	
Lakes and Prairies	Prospect Hill	402	Prospect Hill Monument	Woodbury County	Iowa	"(Site of a prayer meeting held in 1869 by pioneer Presbyterian missionaries Sheldon Jackson, T. C. Cleland, and J. C. Elliot)"
Lakes and Prairies	South Dakota	277	Huron College	Huron	South Dakota	"Presbyterian college founded in 1898"
Lakes and Prairies	South Dakota	308	First Presbyterian Church (Veblen, South Dakota)	Veblen	South Dakota	
Lakes and Prairies	Winnebago	102	Buffalo Presbyterian Church (Montello, Wisconsin)	Montello	Wisconsin	
Lincoln Trails	Blackhawk	157	First Presbyterian Church (St. Anne, Illinois)	St. Anne	Illinois	
Lincoln Trails	Blackhawk	283	Knox Gaelic Presbyterian Church	Toulon	Illinois	
Lincoln Trails	Chicago	8	Second Presbyterian Church (Chicago, Illinois)	Chicago	Illinois	
Lincoln Trails	Chicago	106	First Presbyterian Church (Arlington Heights, Illinois)	Arlington Heights	Illinois	
Lincoln Trails	Chicago	128	First Presbyterian Church (Chicago, Illinois)	Chicago	Illinois	
Lincoln Trails	Great Rivers	38	Monmouth College	Monmouth	Illinois	"(Only college in America founded by Associate Reformed Presbyterians, 1853)"
Lincoln Trails	Great Rivers	150	First Presbyterian Church (Springfield, Illinois)	Springfield	Illinois	
Lincoln Trails	Great Rivers	178	Blackburn College	Carlinville	Illinois	"(Presbyterian college founded in 1837)"
Lincoln Trails	Great Rivers	367	Sugar Tree Grove Cemetery	Monmouth	Illinois	"(Site of Henderson Associate Reformed Church, 1833-1874, the first church in Warren County)"
Lincoln Trails	Great Rivers	380	First Presbyterian Church (Peoria, Illinois)	Peoria	Illinois	
Lincoln Trails	Ohio Valley	80	Indiana Presbyterian Church	Vincennes	Indiana	
Lincoln Trails	Ohio Valley	174	Pisgah Presbyterian Church and Cemetery	Nabb	Indiana	
Lincoln Trails	Ohio Valley	359	Lexington Presbyterian Church	Lexington	Indiana	
Lincoln Trails	Southeastern Illinois	51	First Presbyterian Church	Golconda	Illinois	
Lincoln Trails	Southeastern Illinois	370	Kaskaskia Associate Reformed Presbyterian Church	Evansville	Illinois	
Lincoln Trails	Wabash Valley	73	Thomas Anderson Grave	Huntington	Indiana	?(Pastor of the First Presbyterian Church in Huntington, organized in 1843)" Thomas Anderson
Lincoln Trails	Whitewater Valley	434	President Benjamin Harrison Home	Indianapolis	Indiana	"(Most active churchman of our Presbyterian presidents)"
Living Waters	East Tennessee	61	Bethel Presbyterian Church (Kingston, Tennessee)	Kingston	Tennessee	
Living Waters	Holston	99	New Bethel Presbyterian Church (Piney Flats, Tennessee)	Piney Flats	Tennessee	
Living Waters	Louisville	4	Jeremiah Abell’s Log House	Greensburg	Kentucky	"(One of the oldest log houses in Kentucky, erected in 1796 by the Reverend Jeremiah Abell, pastor of Greensburg Presbyterian Church)"
Living Waters	Memphis	42	First Presbyterian Church (Somerville, Tennessee)	Somerville	Tennessee	
Living Waters	Memphis	235	Bethel Springs Presbyterian Church	Bethel Springs	Tennessee	
Living Waters	Memphis	386	Germantown Presbyterian Church	Germantown	Tennessee	
Living Waters	Mid Kentucky	423	Freedom Cumberland Presbyterian Church	Harned	Kentucky	
Living Waters	Mid Kentucky	430	Needham Cumberland Presbyterian Church	Eastview	Kentucky	
Living Waters	Mid Kentucky	439	Short Creek Cumberland Presbyterian Church	Falls of Rough	Kentucky	
Living Waters	Middle Tennessee	95	Downtown Presbyterian Church	Nashville	Tennessee	
Living Waters	Middle Tennessee	123	Calvary Presbyterian Church of Big Lick	Crossville	Tennessee	
Living Waters	Middle Tennessee	127	Old Beech Cumberland Presbyterian Church	Hendersonville	Tennessee	
Living Waters	Middle Tennessee	151	Bethbirei Presbyterian Church	Lewisburg	Tennessee	
Living Waters	Middle Tennessee	176	First Presbyterian Church (Gallatin, Tennessee)	Gallatin	Tennessee	
Living Waters	Middle Tennessee	177	Suggis Creek Cumberland Presbyterian Church	Mount Juliet	Tennessee	
Living Waters	Middle Tennessee	191	First Presbyterian Church (Clifton, Tennessee)	Clifton	Tennessee	
Living Waters	Middle Tennessee	319	Cane Ridge Cumberland Presbyterian Church	Antioch	Mississippi	
Living Waters	Middle Tennessee	182	Pine Ridge Presbyterian Church	Natchez	Mississippi	
Living Waters	North Alabama	168	First Presbyterian Church (Huntsville, Alabama)	Huntsville	Alabama	
Living Waters	North Alabama	329	Westminster Presbyterian Church	Decatur	Alabama	
Living Waters	Sheppards and Lapsley	435	Carmel Presbyterian Church (original site)	Cherokee County	Alabama	
Living Waters	South Alabama	135	Scotland Presbyterian Church	Tunnel Springs	Alabama	
Living Waters	South Alabama	153	First Presbyterian Church	Jacksonville	Alabama	
Living Waters	St. Andrew	292	First Presbyterian Church	Holly Springs	Mississippi	
Living Waters	St. Andrew	312	First Presbyterian Church	Hernando	Mississippi	
Living Waters	St. Andrew	327	First Presbyterian Church	Holly Springs	Mississippi	
Living Waters	St. Andrew	335	Mississippi Synodical College	Holly Springs	Mississippi	
Living Waters	St. Andrew	338	Mayhew Mission Cemetery	Starkville	Mississippi	"(Site of a Presbyterian mission to the Choctaw Indians, established in 1818)"
Living Waters	St. Andrew	341	First Presbyterian Church	Oxford	Mississippi	
Living Waters	St. Andrew	371	Sand Springs Presbyterian Church	Oxford	Mississippi	
Living Waters	St. Andrew	419	Old Hudsonville Presbyterian Church	Holly Springs	Mississippi	
Living Waters	St. Andrew	426	First Presbyterian Church	Starkville	Mississippi	
Living Waters	Transylvania	130	Danville Presbyterian Church	Danville	Kentucky	
Living Waters	Transylvania	133	Hopewell Presbyterian Church	Paris	Kentucky	
Living Waters	Western Kentucky	139	Sacramento Cumberland Presbyterian Church	Sacramento	Kentucky	
Living Waters	Western Kentucky	280	Little Muddy Cumberland Presbyterian Church, School, and Cemetery	Morgantown, Kentucky	Kentucky	
Living Waters	Western Kentucky	349	First Presbyterian Church	Greenville	Kentucky	
Living Waters	Western Kentucky	369	Mount Zion Presbyterian Church	Central City	Kentucky	
Living Waters	Western Kentucky	394	Presbyterian Church of Bowling Green	Bowling Green	Kentucky	
Living Waters	Western Kentucky	395	Tomb of the Reverend Joseph Lapsley	Bowling Green	Kentucky	"(First minister of Bowling Green's First Presbyterian church, established in 1819)" Joseph Lapsey
Living Waters	Western Kentucky	420	Red River Meeting House	Adairville	Kentucky	
Living Waters	Western Kentucky	422	Mount Olivet Cumberland Presbyterian Church	Warren County	Kentucky	
Living Waters	Western Kentucky	440	Piney Fork Cumberland Presbyterian Church and Cemetery	Marion	Kentucky	
Mid-America	Giddings-Lovejoy	34	Bonhomme Presbyterian Church	Chesterfield	Missouri	
Mid-America	Giddings-Lovejoy	70	Rock Hill Presbyterian Church	Rock Hill	Missouri	
Mid-America	Giddings-Lovejoy	164	Second Presbyterian Church	Saint Louis	Missouri	
Mid-America	Giddings-Lovejoy	189	Bellevue Presbyterian Church	Caledonia	Missouri	
Mid-America	Giddings-Lovejoy	353	Bethel Presbyterian Church (Bay, Missouri)	Bay	Missouri	
Mid-America	Giddings-Lovejoy	397	First Presbyterian Church	Ironton	Missouri	
Mid-America	Giddings-Lovejoy	398	Elijah P. Lovejoy Monument & Gravesite	Alton	Illinois	Elijah P. Lovejoy "(Presbyterian minister and newspaper editor killed in 1837 by mob opposed to his anti-slavery views)"
Mid-America	Giddings-Lovejoy	432	Stephen Hempstead Grave Site, Bellefontaine Cemetery	St. Louis	Missouri	"(Hempstead was important in the development of early St. Louis and the establishment of the Presbyterian community)"
Mid-America	Heartland	18	Park College	Parkville	Missouri	"(Presbyterian college founded in 1875)"
Mid-America	Heartland	19	First Presbyterian Church	Independence, Missouri	Missouri	
Mid-America	Heartland	33	Harmony Osage Mission	Rich Hill	Missouri	"(Mission to the Osage Indians established by the United Foreign Missionary Society in 1821; site of Missouri's first Indian school and a Presbyterian church)"
Mid-America	Heartland	253	Timothy Hill Grave	Kansas City, Missouri	Missouri	Timothy Hill "(Presbyterian minister & missionary to Missouri, 1845)"
Mid-America	John Calvin	145	Waldensian Presbyterian Church	Monett	Missouri	
Mid-America	John Calvin	258	First Presbyterian Church	Parsons	Kansas	
Mid-America	John Calvin	336	Ozark Prairie Presbyterian Church	Mt. Vernon	Missouri	
Mid-America	Missouri Union	12	Salt Fork Cumberland Presbyterian Church	Nelson, Missouri	Missouri	
Mid-America	Missouri Union	25	New Lebanon Presbyterian Church	New Lebanon	Missouri	
Mid-America	Missouri Union	131	First Presbyterian Church	Marshall	Missouri	
Mid-America	Missouri Union	149	Troy Presbyterian Church	Troy, Missouri	Missouri	
Mid-America	Missouri Union	201	The Presbyterian Church of Green Ridge	Green Ridge, Missouri	Missouri	
Mid-America	Missouri Union	203	Macon Presbyterian Church	Macon	Missouri	
Mid-America	Missouri Union	209	Old Auxvasse-Nine Mile Presbyterian Church	Williamsburg	Missouri	
Mid-America	Missouri Union	218	Auburn Presbyterian Church	Silex	Missouri	
Mid-America	Northern Kansas	17	Iowa, Sac and Fox Presbyterian Mission	Highland	Kansas	"(Mission to the Iowa, Sac and Fox Indians established under the auspices of the Presbyterian Board of Foreign Missions in 1837)"
Mid-America	Northern Kansas	374	Irvin Hall, Highland Community College	Highland	Kansas	"(Oldest building on the campus of Highland University, a Presbyterian college founded in 1858)"
Mid-America	Southern Kansas	250	Cooper Hall, Sterling College	Sterling	Kansas	"(Original building of the college founded by the United Presbyterian Church of North America in 1887)"
Mid-America	Southern Kansas	287	First Presbyterian Church	Freeport	Kansas	
Mid-Atlantic	Abingdon	246	Rock Spring Presbyterian Church and cemetery	Meadowview	Virginia	
Mid-America	Baltimore	222	Mt. Paran Presbyterian Church and Cemetery	Randallstown	Maryland	
Mid-America	Charlotte	91	Providence Presbyterian Church	Matthews	North Carolina	
Mid-America	Charlotte	152	Morven Presbyterian Church	Morven	North Carolina	
Mid-America	Coastal Carolina	269	First Presbyterian Church	Maxton	North Carolina	
Mid-America	Coastal Carolina	282	South River Presbyterian Church	Garland	North Carolina	
Mid-America	Coastal Carolina	310	Laurel Hill Presbyterian Church	Laurinburg	North Carolina	
Mid-America	Coastal Carolina	365	Philadelphus Presbyterian Church	Red Springs	North Carolina	
Mid-America	Coastal Carolina	407	St. Pauls Presbyterian Church	St. Pauls	North Carolina	
Mid-America	Coastal Carolina	429	MacPherson Presbyterian Church	Fayetteville	North Carolina	
Mid-America	The James	96	Presbyterian Church	Fredericksburg	Virginia	
Mid-America	The James	129	Hartwood Presbyterian Church	Hartwood	Virginia	
Mid-America	The James	196	Nottoway Presbyterian Church	Nottoway Court House	Virginia	
Mid-America	The James	220	Big Oak Presbyterian Church and Cemetery	Amelia Court House	Virginia	
Mid-America	The James	221	Aberdour Presbyterian Church	Jarratt	Virginia	
Mid-America	The James	247	Union Theological Seminary in Virginia	Richmond	Virginia	
Mid-America	The James	265	Mitchells Presbyterian Church	Mitchells	Virginia	
Mid-America	National Capital	22	Old Presbyterian Meeting House	Alexandria	Virginia	
Mid-America	National Capital	53	Leesburg Presbyterian Church	Leesburg	Virginia	
Mid-America	National Capital	205	Lewinsville Presbyterian Church	McLean	Virginia	
Mid-America	National Capital	326	New York Avenue Presbyterian Church	Washington, D.C.	D.C.	
Mid-America	New Castle	56	Cool Spring Presbyterian Church	Harbeson	Delaware	
Mid-America	New Castle	89	Christiana Presbyterian Church	Christiana	Delaware	
Mid-America	New Castle	141	Old Blackwater Presbyterian Church	Frankford	Delaware	
Mid-America	New Castle	224	Rehoboth Presbyterian Church	Rehobeth	Maryland	
Mid-America	New Castle	248	Barren Creek Springs Presbyterian Church	Mardela Springs	Maryland	
Mid-America	New Castle	254	Red Clay Creek Presbyterian Church	Wilmington	Delaware	
Mid-America	New Castle	256	New Castle Presbyterian Church	New Castle	Delaware	
Mid-America	New Hope	159	Plymouth Presbyterian Church	Plymouth	North Carolina	
Mid-America	New Hope	206	Albion Academy	Franklinton	North Carolina	"(Co-educational school for AfricanAmericans founded in 1866 by the Presbyterian Church in the U.S.A. Board of Missions for Freedmen"
Mid-America	New Hope	228	First Presbyterian Church	New Bern	North Carolina	
Mid-America	New Hope	366	First Presbyterian Church	Raleigh	North Carolina	
Mid-America	New Hope	372	Main Building, Peace College	Raleigh	North Carolina	"(First building constructed on the campus of Peace College, founded as a women's college by the Presbyterian Church in 1857)"
Mid-America	The Peaks	138	Bouldin Memorial Presbyterian Church	Stuart	Virginia	
Mid-America	The Peaks	194	Buffalo Presbyterian Church (Pamplin, Virginia)	Pamplin, Virginia	Virginia	
Mid-America	The Peaks	200	Falling Spring Presbyterian Church	Glasgow	Virginia	
Mid-America	The Peaks	210	Hat Creek Presbyterian Church	Brookneal	Virginia	
Mid-America	Salem	40	David Caldwell Log College	Greensboro	North Carolina	"(Classical academy established in 1767 by Caldwell, a Presbyterian minister and one of the writers of the Constitution of the State of North Carolina)" David Caldwell
Mid-America	Salem	44	Speedwell Presbyterian Church	Reidsville	North Carolina	
Mid-America	Salem	120	Buffalo Presbyterian Church (Greensboro, North Carolina)	Greensboro	North Carolina	
Mid-America	Salem	140	Madison Presbyterian Church	Madison	North Carolina	
Mid-America	Salem	158	Hawfields Presbyterian Church	Mebane	North Carolina	
Mid-America	Salem	167	Prospect Presbyterian Church	Mooresville	North Carolina	
Mid-America	Salem	355	Love Valley Presbyterian Church	Love Valley	North Carolina	
Mid-America	Salem	428	Bethel Presbyterian Church (McLeansville, North Carolina)	McLeansville	North Carolina	
Mid-America	Shenandoah	84	Augusta Stone Presbyterian Church	Fort Defiance	Virginia	
Mid-America	Shenandoah	101	Timber Ridge Old Stone Presbyterian Church	Lexington	Virginia	
Mid-America	Shenandoah	108	New Monmouth Presbyterian Church	Lexington	Virginia	
Mid-America	Shenandoah	109	Tinkling Spring Presbyterian Church	Fisherville	Virginia	
Mid-America	Shenandoah	111	New Providence Presbyterian Church (Raphine, Virginia)	Raphine	Virginia	
Mid-America	Shenandoah	112	Mossy Creek Presbyterian Church	Mount Solon	Virginia	
Mid-America	Shenandoah	132	Old Stone Presbyterian Church	Winchester	Virginia	
Mid-America	Shenandoah	137	Cooks Creek Presbyterian Church	Harrisonburg	Virginia	
Mid-America	Shenandoah	148	Windy Cove Presbyterian Church	Millboro Springs	Virginia	
Mid-America	Shenandoah	154	Charles Town Presbyterian Church	Charles Town	West Virginia	
Mid-America	Shenandoah	156	Falling Waters Presbyterian Church	Hedgesville	West Virginia	
Mid-America	Shenandoah	161	Oxford Presbyterian Church	Lexington	Virginia	
Mid-America	Shenandoah	169	Opequon Presbyterian Church	Winchester	Virginia	
Mid-America	Shenandoah	180	Gerrardstown Presbyterian Church	Gerrardstown	West Virginia	
Mid-America	Shenandoah	207	Warm Springs Presbyterian Church	Warm Springs	Virginia	
Mid-America	Shenandoah	216	Strasburg Presbyterian Church	Strasburg	Virginia	
Mid-America	Shenandoah	233	McDowell Presbyterian Church	McDowell	Virginia	
Mid-America	Shenandoah	273	Old Providence Meeting House	Spottswood	Virginia	
Mid-America	Western North Carolina	204	First Presbyterian Church	Asheville	North Carolina	
Mid-America	Western North Carolina	346	First Presbyterian Church	Franklin	North Carolina	
Northeast	Albany	15	Esperance Presbyterian Church	Esperance	New York	
Northeast	Albany	237	Ballston Spa Presbyterian Church	Ballston Spa	New York	
Northeast	Albany	389	Batchellerville Presbyterian Church	Batchellerville	New York	
Northeast	Elizabeth	9	First Presbyterian Church	Springfield	New Jersey	
Northeast	Elizabeth	21	First Presbyterian Church	Rahway	New Jersey	
Northeast	Elizabeth	36	Westfield Presbyterian Church	Westfield	New Jersey	
Northeast	Elizabeth	43	Basking Ridge Presbyterian Church	Basking Ridge	New Jersey	
Northeast	Elizabeth	48	First Presbyterian Church	Elizabeth	New Jersey	
Northeast	Elizabeth	357	First Presbyterian Church & Cemetery	Woodbridge	New Jersey	
Northeast	Geneva	294	Narcissa Prentiss House	Prattsburg	New York	"(Birthplace of Narcissa Prentiss Whitman, wife of Marcus Whitman and missionary to the Cayuse Indians in Oregon Territory, 1836-1847)"
Northeast	Geneva	360	East Palmyra Presbyterian Church	East Palmyra, New York	New York	
Northeast	Geneva	442	Third Presbyterian Church	Rochester	New York	
Northeast	Hudson River	7	First Presbyterian Church of Yorktown	Yorktown Heights	New York	
Northeast	Hudson River	52	Bedford Presbyterian Church	Bedford	New York	
Northeast	Hudson River	118	Neelytown Cemetery	Hamptonburgh	New York	"(Site of the oldest Seceder congregation in New York)"
Northeast	Hudson River	143	Peekskill Presbyterian Church	Peekskill	New York	
Northeast	Hudson River	172	The Reformed Church	Poughkeepsie	New York	
Northeast	Hudson River	231	Seamanville Cemetery	Monroe	New York	"(Site of the first Presbyterian meeting house in Monroe, 1783)"
Northeast	Hudson River	257	First Presbyterian Church	Monticello	New York	
Northeast	Hudson River	337	Gilmor Sloane House	Stony Point	New York	"(Retreat and meeting center for Presbyterian and ecumenical groups, constructed in 1856)"
Northeast	Hudson River	400	Central Presbyterian Church	Haverstraw	New York	
Northeast	Hudson River	404	Calvary Presbyterian Church	Newburgh	New York	
Northeast	Long Island	100	First Presbyterian Church	Southold	New York	
Northeast	Long Island	208	First Presbyterian Church	Southampton	New York	
Northeast	Long Island	223	Cutchogue Presbyterian Church	Cutchogue	New York	
Northeast	Long Island	293	First Presbyterian Church	Sag Harbor	New York	
Northeast	Monmouth	238	First Presbyterian Church	Cranbury	New Jersey	
Northeast	Monmouth	245	Bethel Indian Mission	Jamesburg	New Jersey	"(Established by Presbyterian minister David Brainerd in 1746)"
Northeast	New Brunswick	20	First Presbyterian Church	Pennington	New Jersey	
Northeast	New Brunswick	26	Kingston Presbyterian Church	Kingston	New Jersey	
Northeast	New Brunswick	225	Shrewsbury Presbyterian Church	Shrewsbury	New Jersey	
Northeast	New Brunswick	234	First Presbyterian Church of Ewing	Ewing	New Jersey	
Northeast	New Brunswick	305	Princeton Theological Seminary	Princeton	New Jersey	
Northeast	New Brunswick	328	First Presbyterian Church	Lawrenceville	New Jersey	
Northeast	New York City	388	First Presbyterian Church	New York City	New York	
Northeast	New York City	405	First Presbyterian Church of Newton	Newton	New Jersey	
Northeast	Newark	29	Old First Presbyterian Church	Newark	New Jersey	
Northeast	Newark	65	First Presbyterian Church Burying Ground	Orange	New Jersey	
Northeast	Newton	361	First Presbyterian Church of Upper Hardwick	Johnsonburg	New Jersey	
Northeast	Newton	406	Hillside Cemetery (Madison, New Jersey)	Madison, New Jersey; 40.755012°N 74.411198°W	New Jersey	"(Site of the first Presbyterian church in Madison, established in 1748)"
Northeast	Northern New England	16	First Presbyterian Church	Newburyport	Massachusetts	
Northeast	Northern New England	119	Eliot Presbyterian Church	Lowell	Massachusetts	
Northeast	Northern New England	288	Old Walpole Meeting House	Walpole	Maine	
Northeast	Northern New England	307	Ryegate Town House	Ryegate Corner	Vermont	"(Constructed in 1797; site of the first Presbyterian meeting house in the settlement of Ryegate)"
Northeast	Northern New England	317	Bedford Center Presbyterian Church	Bedford	New Hampshire	
Northeast	Northern New England	318	Barnet Center Presbyterian Church	Barnet, Vermont	Vermont	
Northeast	Southern New England	275	First Presbyterian Church	Stamford	Connecticut	
Northeast	Southern New England	295	First Presbyterian Church	Newport	Rhode Island	
Northeast	West Jersey	244	Cold Spring Presbyterian Church	Cape May	New Jersey	
Northeast	West Jersey	332	First Presbyterian Church	Blackwood	New Jersey	
Northeast	Western New York	286	Presbyterian House	Chautauqua	New York	}(Place of accommodation, gathering and worship for Presbyterians at Chautauqua Institution since 1889)"
Northeast	Western New York	424	First Presbyterian Church	Westfield	New York	
Pacific	Boise	181	Sterry Hall, College of Idaho	Caldwell	Idaho	"(Idaho's first institution of higher education, founded by the Presbyterian Church in 1890)" College of Idaho Sterry Hall
Pacific	Boise	3	Clatsop Plains Pioneer Presbyterian Church	Warrenton	Oregon	
Pacific	Boise	278	First Presbyterian Church	Portland	Oregon	
Pacific	Kendall	239	First Presbyterian Church	Malad City	Idaho	
Pacific	Kendall	243	Soda Springs Presbyterian Church	Soda Springs	Idaho	
Pacific	Nevada	285	First Presbyterian Church	Carson City	Nevada	
Pacific	Nevada	301	First Presbyterian Church	Virginia City	Nevada	
Pacific	The Redwoods	381	Montgomery Memorial Chapel, San Francisco Theological Seminary	San Anselmo	California	try Montgomery Memorial Chapel, San Francisco Theological Seminary
Pacific	Sacramento	373	Westminster Presbyterian Church	Sacramento	California	
Pacific	Sacramento	415	Carmichael Presbyterian Church	Carmichael	California	
Pacific	San Francisco	232	Donaldina Cameron House	San Francisco	California	(Presbyterian Church in the U.S.A. mission house established in 1873 to minister to Chinese immigrants and named for a former director)"
Pacific	San Francisco	391	Founders Memorial Chapel, First Presbyterian Church	Livermore	California	
Pacific	San Francisco	410	St. John's Presbyterian Church	San Francisco	California	
Pacific	Stockton	10	First Presbyterian Church	Columbia	California	
Rocky Mountains	Pueblo	418	San Rafael Presbyterian Church	Mogote	Colorado	
Rocky Mountains	Denver	92	1886 Church	Brighton	Colorado	
Rocky Mountains	Denver	259	Sheldon Jackson Memorial Chapel	Fairplay	Colorado	(Congregation founded in 1872 by Presbyterian missionary Sheldon Jackson)"
Rocky Mountains	Denver	437	First Presbyterian Church	Georgetown	Colorado	"(Congregation founded in 1869 by Presbyterian missionary Sheldon Jackson)"
Rocky Mountains	Plains and Peaks	343	First Presbyterian Church	Gordon	Nebraska	
Rocky Mountains	Utah	323	First Presbyterian Church (Salt Lake City, Utah)	Salt Lake City	Utah	
Rocky Mountains	Western Colorado	298	Community Presbyterian Church	Lake City	Colorado	
Rocky Mountains	Western Colorado	304	Community Presbyterian Church Manse	Lake City	Colorado	
Rocky Mountains	Wyoming	300	France Memorial Presbyterian Church	Rawlins	Wyoming	
Rocky Mountains	Yellowstone	74	First Presbyterian Chapel	White Sulphur Springs	Montana	
South Atlantic	Charleston-Atlantic	1	Second Presbyterian Church	Charleston	South Carolina	
South Atlantic	Charleston-Atlantic	114	Johns Island Presbyterian Church	Johns Island	South Carolina	
South Atlantic	Charleston-Atlantic	195	Circular Congregational Church	Charleston	South Carolina	
South Atlantic	Cherokee	146	Sumach Cumberland Presbyterian Church	Chatsworth	Georgia	
South Atlantic	Florida	284	First Presbyterian Church	Monticello	Florida	
South Atlantic	Foothills	86	First Presbyterian Church	Greenville	South Carolina	
South Atlantic	Foothills	136	Nazareth Presbyterian Church	Moore	South Carolina	
South Atlantic	Foothills	401	Old Pickens Presbyterian Church	Oconee County	South Carolina	
South Atlantic	Greater Atlanta	227	North Avenue Presbyterian Church	Atlanta	Georgia	
South Atlantic	New Harmony	198	Kingston Presbyterian Church	Conway	South Carolina	
South Atlantic	New Harmony	268	Marion Presbyterian Church	Marion	South Carolina	
South Atlantic	New Harmony	297	Pee Dee Presbyterian Church	Dillon	South Carolina	
South Atlantic	New Harmony	383	Ebenezer Presbyterian Church & Parochial School	Dalzell	South Carolina	
South Atlantic	Northeast Georgia	409	Hebron Presbyterian Church	Banks County	Georgia	
South Atlantic	Providence	41	Old Waxhaw Presbyterian Church	Lancaster	South Carolina	
South Atlantic	Providence	274	First Presbyterian Church	York	South Carolina	
South Atlantic	Providence	290	Purity Presbyterian Church	Chester	South Carolina	
South Atlantic	Providence	291	Fishing Creek Presbyterian Church & Cemetery	Chester	South Carolina	
South Atlantic	Savannah	77	Independent Presbyterian Church	Savannah	Georgia	
South Atlantic	Savannah	98	White Bluff Presbyterian Church	Savannah	Georgia	
South Atlantic	Savannah	378	Flemington Presbyterian Church	Flemington	Georgia	
South Atlantic	St. Augustine	279	First Presbyterian Church	Fernandina Beach	Florida	
South Atlantic	St. Augustine	309	First Presbyterian Church	Jacksonville	Florida	
South Atlantic	Tampa Bay	345	Andrews Memorial Chapel, First Presbyterian Church	Dunedin	Florida	try Andrews Memorial Chapel, First Presbyterian Church (Dunedin, Florida)
South Atlantic	Tampa Bay	379	Parsons Memorial Presbyterian Church	Yankeetown	Florida	
South Atlantic	Tampa Bay	431	First Presbyterian Church	Dunedin	Florida	
South Atlantic	Trinity	107	Upper Long Cane Presbyterian Church	Abbeville	South Carolina	
South Atlantic	Trinity	202	Mount Olivet Presbyterian Church	Winnsboro	South Carolina	
South Atlantic	Trinity	272	Ebenezer Associate Reformed Presbyterian Church	Winnsboro	South Carolina	
South Atlantic	Trinity	377	Greenville Presbyterian Church	Donalds	South Carolina	
South Atlantic	Trinity	387	Little River Presbyterian Church	Kinards	South Carolina	
Southern California and Hawaii	The Pacific	126	Community Presbyterian Church	South Gate	California	
Southern California and Hawaii	The Pacific	316	First Presbyterian Church	Honolulu	Hawaii	
Southern California and Hawaii	Riverside	362	Presbyterian Church of Coachella Valley	Coachella	California	
Southern California and Hawaii	San Diego	147	Lakeside Community Presbyterian Church	Lakeside	California	
Southern California and Hawaii	San Diego	311	Graham Memorial Presbyterian Church	Coronado	California	
Southern California and Hawaii	San Fernando	321	First Presbyterian Church	Newhall	California	
Southern California and Hawaii	San Gabriel	188	Monte Vista Grove Homes	Pasadena	California	"(First retirement facility for Presbyterian missionaries, established in 1924)"
Southern California and Hawaii	San Gabriel	441	Calvary Presbyterian Church	South Pasadena	California	
Southwest	Grand Canyon	320	First Presbyterian Church	Sacaton	Arizona	
Southwest	Santa Fe	445	First Presbyterian Church	Santa Fe	New Mexico	
Southwest	Santa Fe	217	Menaul School	Albuquerque	New Mexico	"(Founded in 1881 and administered by the Presbyterian Church, first as a school for Mexican boys and currently as a coeducational high school)"
Southwest	Santa Fe	236	Allison-James School	Santa Fe	New Mexico	"(School founded by Presbyterians in 1866)"
Southwest	Santa Fe	261	Good Shepherd Presbyterian Church	Farmington	New Mexico	
Southwest	Santa Fe	302	First Presbyterian Church	Raton	New Mexico	
Southwest	Santa Fe	322	Community Presbyterian Church	Jemez Springs	New Mexico	
Southwest	Santa Fe	331	Aztec Presbyterian Church	Aztec	New Mexico	
Southwest	Sierra Blanca	347	First Presbyterian Church	Lovington	New Mexico	
Sun	Arkansas	64	First Presbyterian Church	Clarendon	Arkansas	
Sun	Arkansas	134	Morrow Hall, Arkansas College	Batesville	Arkansas	"(Original classroom building, erected in 1872, of Arkansas College, founded by the Presbyterian Church in 1862)"
Sun	Arkansas	171	First Presbyterian Church	Little Rock	Arkansas	
Sun	Arkansas	270	Pisgah Associate Reformed Presbyterian Church	Pottsville	Arkansas	
Sun	Arkansas	351	Cane Hill Presbyterian Church	Cane Hill	Arkansas	
Sun	Arkansas	396	Shiloh Cumberland Presbyterian Church	Russellville	Arkansas	
Sun	Arkansas	425	Mt. Olive Cumberland Presbyterian Church	Mt. Olive	Arkansas	
Sun	Eastern Oklahoma	296	Wheelock Presbyterian Church	Millertown	Oklahoma	
Sun	Eastern Oklahoma	303	Dwight Mission	Vian	Oklahoma	"(Presbyterian mission to the Cherokee Indians, established in 1829)"
Sun	Grace	173	First Presbyterian Church	Clifton	Texas	
Sun	Grace	184	Gum Spring Presbyterian Church	Kilgore	Texas	
Sun	Grace	192	Davis-Ansley Log Cabin	Denison	Texas	"(Meeting house of the first Presbyterian congregation in Grayson County, organized in 1839)"
Sun	Grace	266	Carolina Cemetery	Lott	Texas	"(Site of the first Presbyterian church in west Falls County)"
Sun	Grace	306	Grave of John May Becton	Kilgore	Texas	"(Presbyterian missionary in Texas, 1841)" John May Becton
Sun	Grace	324	First Presbyterian Church	Kilgore	Texas	
Sun	Grace	443	First Presbyterian Church	Winnsboro	Texas	
Sun	Mission	214	Harper Presbyterian Church	Harper	Texas	
Sun	Mission	251	First Presbyterian Church	San Antonio	Texas	
Sun	Mission	267	First Presbyterian Church	Menard	Texas	
Sun	Mission	436	The Seminary Chapel, Austin Presbyterian Theological Seminary	Austin	Texas	try Austin Presbyterian Theological Seminary
Sun	New Covenant	170	First Presbyterian Church	Orange	Texas	
Sun	New Covenant	339	Webster Presbyterian Church	Webster	Texas	
Sun	Pines	344	Alto Presbyterian Church	Alto	Louisiana	
Sun	South Louisiana	313	First Presbyterian Church	New Orleans	Louisiana	
Sun	South Louisiana	314	Grave of Dr. Sylvester Larned	New Orleans	Louisiana	"(First minister of the First Presbyterian Church of New Orleans, 1818-1820)" Sylvester Larned
Sun	South Louisiana	315	Hungarian Presbyterian Church	Albany	Louisiana	
Trinity	Beaver-Butler	14	Mill Creek Presbyterian Church Cemetery	Hookstown	Pennsylvania	
Trinity	Beaver-Butler	47	Greersburg Academy	Darlington	Pennsylvania	"(First academy west of Pittsburgh, founded by the Presbyterian Church in 1804)"
Trinity	Beaver-Butler	49	Service United Presbyterian Church	Aliquippa	Pennsylvania	
Trinity	Beaver-Butler	57	Darlington Reformed Presbyterian Church	Darlington	Pennsylvania	
Trinity	Beaver-Butler	67	Calvin Presbyterian Church	Zelienople	Pennsylvania	
Trinity	Beaver-Butler	68	Mt. Pleasant Presbyterian Church	Darlington	Pennsylvania	
Trinity	Beaver-Butler	81	Frankfort Presbyterian Church	Hookstown	Pennsylvania	
Trinity	Beaver-Butler	299	Fern Cliffe, Geneva College	Beaver Falls	Pennsylvania	"(Oldest building on the Geneva College campus, a college of the Reformed Presbyterian Church of North America, 1879)"
Trinity	Carlisle	24	Paxtang Reformed Presbyterian Church	Harrisburg	Pennsylvania	
Trinity	Carlisle	46	Paxton Presbyterian Church	Harrisburg	Pennsylvania	
Trinity	Carlisle	54	First Presbyterian Church	Carlisle	Pennsylvania	
Trinity	Carlisle	94	Gettysburg Presbyterian Church	Gettysburg	Pennsylvania	
Trinity	Carlisle	104	Middle Spring Presbyterian Church	Shippensburg	Pennsylvania	
Trinity	Carlisle	121	Old Hanover Presbyterian Churchyard	Grantville	Pennsylvania	
Trinity	Carlisle	155	Monaghan Presbyterian Church	Dillsburg	Pennsylvania	
Trinity	Carlisle	163	First Presbyterian Church	Millerstown	Pennsylvania	
Trinity	Carlisle	166	Lower Marsh Creek Presbyterian Church	Gettysburg	Pennsylvania	
Trinity	Carlisle	197	Big Spring Presbyterian Church	Newville	Pennsylvania	
Trinity	Carlisle	226	Alexander Dobbin House	Gettysburg	Pennsylvania	"(Site of a theological seminary established in 1788 by Dobbin, a Reformed Presbyterian pastor)"
Trinity	Carlisle	334	Blacks Graveyard	Gettysburg	Pennsylvania	"(First site of Gettysburg Presbyterian Church, c. 1740)"
Trinity	Carlisle	417	Derry Presbyterian Church	Hershey	Pennsylvania	
Trinity	Donegal	31	Upper Octorara Presbyterian Church	Parkesburg	Pennsylvania	
Trinity	Donegal	35	Guinston Presbyterian Church	Airville	Pennsylvania	
Trinity	Donegal	37	First Presbyterian Church	Lancaster	Pennsylvania	
Trinity	Donegal	60	East Vincent United Church of Christ	Phoenixville	Pennsylvania	
Trinity	Donegal	71	Chestnut Level Presbyterian Church	Quarryville	Pennsylvania	
Trinity	Donegal	72	Oxford Presbyterian Church	Oxford	Pennsylvania	
Trinity	Donegal	76	Forks of the Brandywine Presbyterian Church	Glen Moore	Pennsylvania	
Trinity	Donegal	122	Middle Octorara Covenanter Church	Quarryville	Pennsylvania	
Trinity	Donegal	199	Donegal Presbyterian Church	Mount Joy	Pennsylvania	
Trinity	Donegal	212	Doe Run Presbyterian Church and Cemetery	Coatesville	Pennsylvania	
Trinity	Donegal	340	Trinity Presbyterian Church	Berwyn	Pennsylvania	
Trinity	Donegal	408	"The Church in the Barrens"	Delta	Pennsylvania	try Church in the Barrens The Church in the Barrens
Trinity	Huntingdon	13	Shavers Creek Presbyterian Church at Manor Hill	Huntingdon	Pennsylvania	
Trinity	Huntingdon	23	Robert E. Speer Birthplace	Huntingdon	Pennsylvania	"(Prominent Presbyterian layman who served the Presbyterian Church in the U.S.A. for 46 years as Secretary of the Board of Foreign Missions and as Moderator of the General Assembly in 1927)"
Trinity	Huntingdon	186	Kylertown Presbyterian Church	Kylertown	Pennsylvania	
Trinity	Huntingdon	356	Upper Tuscarora Presbyterian Church & Cemetery	Waterloo	Pennsylvania	
Trinity	Huntingdon	364	McWilliams Cemetery	Waterloo	Pennsylvania	"(Presbyterian cemetery dating to 1766, the oldest in Juniata County)"
Trinity	Kiskiminetas	85	Gilgal Presbyterian Church	Marion Center	Pennsylvania	
Trinity	Kiskiminetas	213	Saltsburg Presbyterian Church	Saltsburg	Pennsylvania	
Trinity	Kiskiminetas	330	Ebenezer Presbyterian Church	Lewisville	Pennsylvania	
Trinity	Kiskiminetas	333	Numine Presbyterian Church	Nu Mine	Pennsylvania	
Trinity	Kiskiminetas	352	Bethel Presbyterian Church (Indiana, Pennsylvania)	Indiana, Pennsylvania	Pennsylvania	
Trinity	Kiskiminetas	376	Union Presbyterian Church & Cemetery	Cowansville	Pennsylvania	
Trinity	Kiskiminetas	421	Slate Lick United Presbyterian Church Cemetery	South Buffalo	Pennsylvania	
Trinity	Lackawanna	124	First Presbyterian Church	Athens	Pennsylvania	
Trinity	Northumberland	249	Warrior Run Presbyterian Church	Watsontown	Pennsylvania	
Trinity	Northumberland	271	Old Buffalo Presbyterian Church (Lewisburg, Pennsylvania)	Lewisburg	Pennsylvania	
Trinity	Philadelphia	27	The Third, Scots & Mariners Presbyterian Church	Philadelphia	Pennsylvania	
Trinity	Philadelphia	28	North & Southampton Reformed Church	Churchville	Pennsylvania	
Trinity	Philadelphia	32	Old Norriton Presbyterian Church	Fairview Village	Pennsylvania	
Trinity	Philadelphia	39	Deep Run Presbyterian Church	Perkasie	Pennsylvania	
Trinity	Philadelphia	45	Old First Reformed Church (Philadelphia, Pennsylvania)	Philadelphia	Pennsylvania	
Trinity	Philadelphia	55	Falkner Swamp Reformed Church	New Hanover	Pennsylvania	
Trinity	Philadelphia	75	Bensalem Presbyterian Church	Bensalem	Pennsylvania	
Trinity	Philadelphia	87	Neshaminy-Warwick Presbyterian Church	Hartsville	Pennsylvania	
Trinity	Philadelphia	88	Neshaminy-Warwick Presbyterian Church Cemetery	Hartsville	Pennsylvania	
Trinity	Philadelphia	179	Abington Presbyterian Church	Abington	Pennsylvania	
Trinity	Philadelphia	229	Leiper Presbyterian Church	Swarthmore	Pennsylvania	
Trinity	Philadelphia	325	Overbrook Presbyterian Church	Philadelphia	Pennsylvania	
Trinity	Pittsburgh	30	Shadyside Presbyterian Church	Pittsburgh	Pennsylvania	
Trinity	Pittsburgh	58	Bethel Presbyterian Church (Bethel Park, Pennsylvania)	Bethel Park, Pennsylvania	Pennsylvania	
Trinity	Pittsburgh	59	Beulah Presbyterian Church	Pittsburgh	Pennsylvania	
Trinity	Pittsburgh	263	First Presbyterian Church	Pittsburgh	Pennsylvania	
Trinity	Pittsburgh	363	East Liberty Presbyterian Church	Pittsburgh	Pennsylvania	
Trinity	Redstone	90	St. Paul's Presbyterian Church	Somerset	Pennsylvania	
Trinity	Redstone	93	Unity Presbyterian Church	Latrobe	Pennsylvania	
Trinity	Redstone	97	Old St. Clair Cemetery	Greensburg	Pennsylvania	"(Site of the First Presbyterian church in Greensburg, 1816)"
Trinity	Redstone	116	Christ Presbyterian Church	North Huntingdon	Pennsylvania	
Trinity	Redstone	375	Old Salem Church & Cemetery	New Derry	Pennsylvania	
Trinity	Redstone	390	Rehoboth Presbyterian Church	Belle Vernon	Pennsylvania	
Trinity	Redstone	411	Middle Presbyterian Church	Mount Pleasant	Pennsylvania	
Trinity	Shenango	105	First Presbyterian Church	New Castle	Pennsylvania	
Trinity	Shenango	414	Amity Presbyterian Church	Grove City	Pennsylvania	
Trinity	Upper Ohio Valley	384	First Presbyterian Church	Wheeling	West Virginia	
Trinity	Upper Ohio Valley	438	Two Ridges Presbyterian Church	Wintersville	Ohio	
Trinity	Washington	6	Pigeon Creek Presbyterian Church	Eighty-Four	Pennsylvania	
Trinity	West Virginia	117	Elk Branch Presbyterian Church	Duffields	West Virginia	
Trinity	West Virginia	211	First Presbyterian Church	St. Albans	West Virginia	
Trinity	West Virginia	444	Kuhn Memorial Presbyterian Church	Barboursville	West Virginia	

== to be checked ==
Historic sites on the registry include:

- numerous ones on List of Presbyterian churches in Pennsylvania
- 371 Sand Spring Presbyterian Church
- 323 First Presbyterian Church of Salt Lake City

== See also ==
- List of heritage registers
