= Buffalo Presbyterian Church =

Buffalo Presbyterian Church may refer to:

- Buffalo Presbyterian Church and Cemetery, Greensboro, North Carolina, listed on the National Register of Historic Places (NRHP)
- Buffalo Presbyterian Church and Cemeteries, Sanford, North Carolina, NRHP-listed
- Buffalo Presbyterian Church (Lewisburg, Pennsylvania), NRHP-listed, also known as "Old Buffalo Presbyterian Church"
- Buffalo Presbyterian Church (Montello, Wisconsin), a Presbyterian historic site
- Buffalo Presbyterian Church (Pamplin, Virginia), NRHP-listed
- Buffalo Mountain Presbyterian Church and Cemetery, Willis, Virginia, NRHP-listed
