= Buffalo Presbyterian Church (Lewisburg, Pennsylvania) =

Historic church in Pennsylvania, United States

- U.S. National Register of Historic Places
- Pennsylvania state historical marker
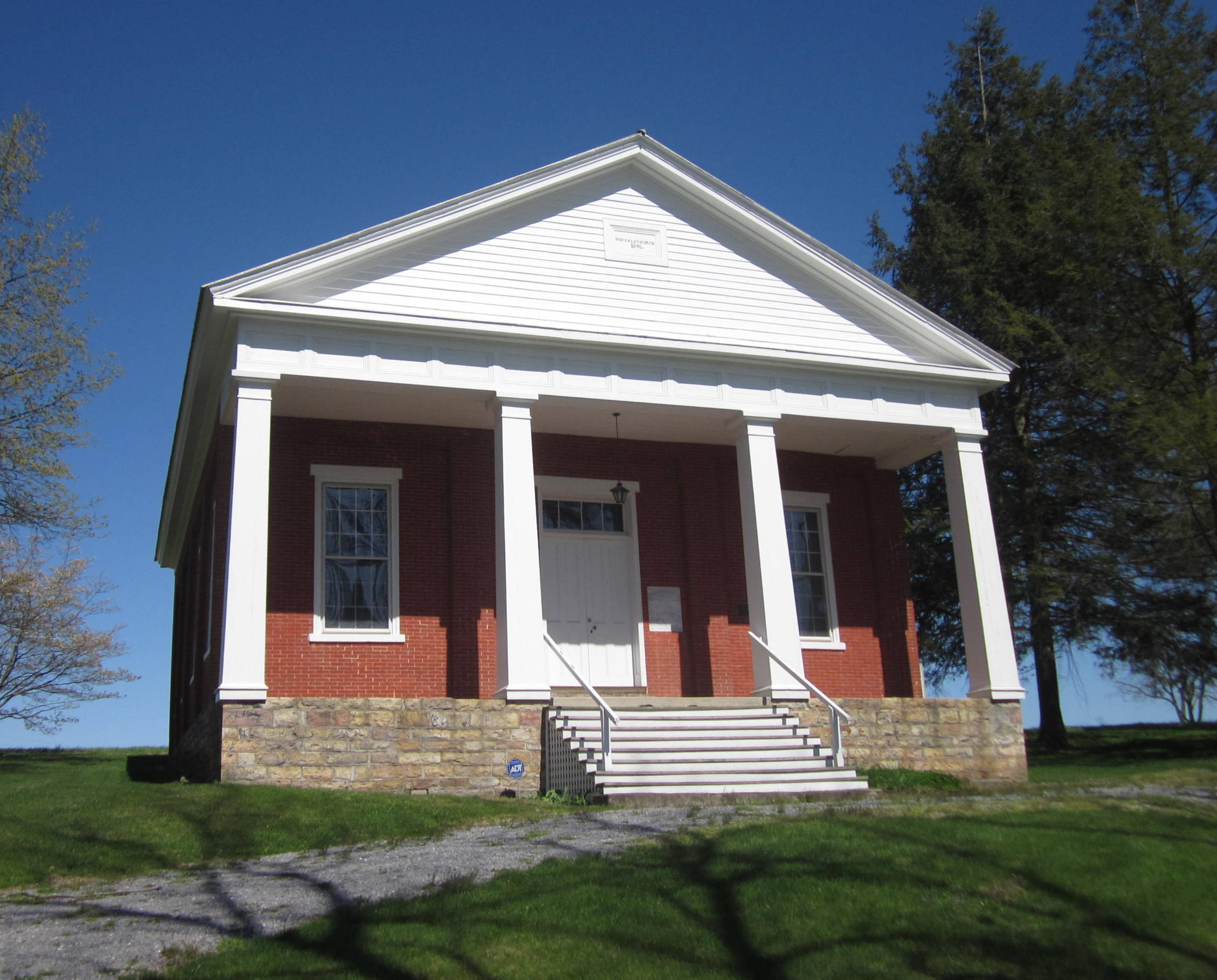
- Buffalo Presbyterian Church, April 2012

- Location within Pennsylvania Location within the United States
- Location: West of Lewisburg on Pennsylvania Route 192, Buffalo Township, Pennsylvania
- Coordinates: 40°57′47″N 76°58′4″W
- Area: 4 acres (1.6 ha)
- Built: 1846
- NRHP reference No.: 76001675

Significant dates
- Added to NRHP: January 30, 1976
- Designated PHMC: June 09, 1948

Buffalo Presbyterian Church is a historic Presbyterian church located at Buffalo Township, Union County, Pennsylvania. It was built in 1846, and is a one-story, brick and wood-frame building, three bays wide and four bays deep. It features a full-width portico supported by four square columns.

It was listed on the National Register of Historic Places in 1976.

It is also known as the Old Buffalo Presbyterian Church and is listed as that on the American Presbyterian/Reformed Historic Sites Registry as its site # 271.
