= First Presbyterian Church and Churchyard =

Historic church in North Carolina, United States

- U.S. National Register of Historic Places
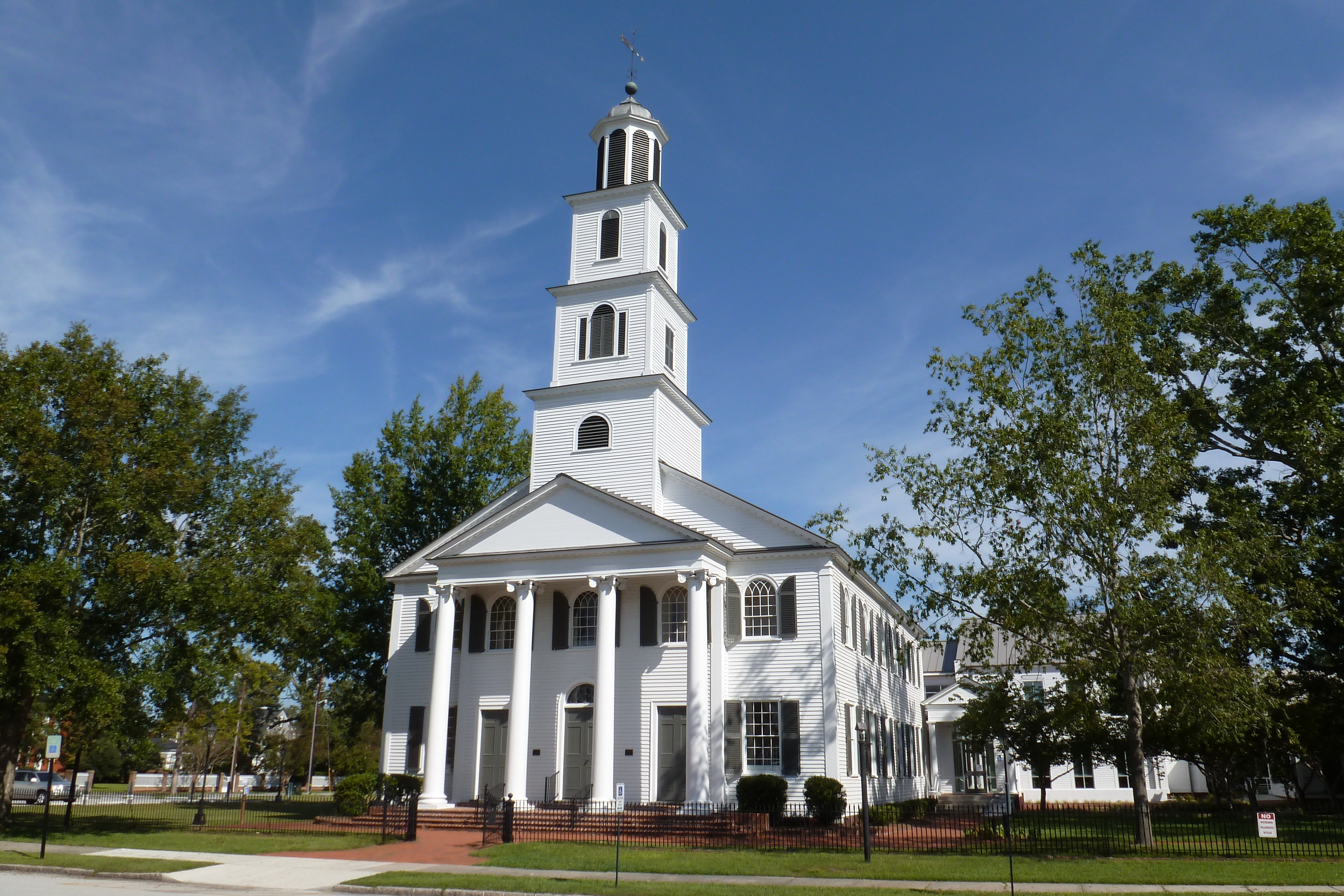

- Location within North Carolina Location within the United States
- Location: New St. between Middle and Hancock Sts., New Bern, North Carolina
- Coordinates: 35°6′35″N 77°2′25″W
- Area: 1 acre (0.40 ha)
- Built: 1820
- Architect: Uriah Sandy, Daniel D. Merrill
- NRHP reference No.: 72000942
- Added to NRHP: February 1, 1972

First Presbyterian Church and Churchyard is a historic Presbyterian church on New Street between Middle and Hancock Streets in New Bern, Craven County, North Carolina. It was built in 1820, and is a rectangular frame church building with two tiers of windows. It features a tetrastyle pedimented Ionic order portico and projecting four stage tower topped by an arcaded octagonal belfry. During the Civil War, the church was converted into a military hospital by the Union forces.

It was listed on the National Register of Historic Places in 1972.
