= Cool Spring Presbyterian Church =

Historic church in Delaware, United States

- U.S. National Register of Historic Places
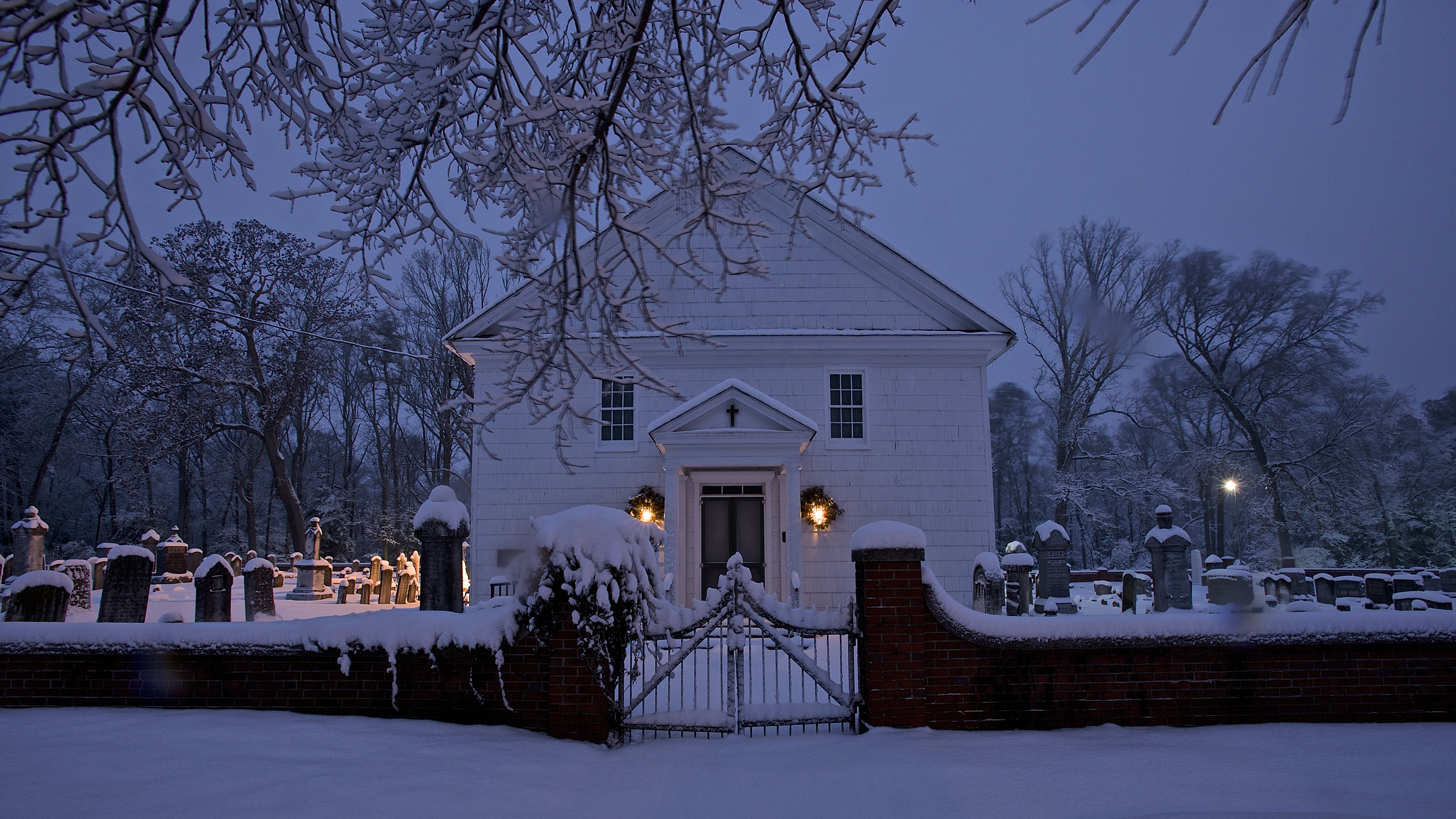

- Location within Delaware Location within the United States
- Location: West of Lewes on Road 247, near Lewes, Delaware
- Coordinates: 38°44′13″N 75°14′21″W
- Area: 4.4 acres (1.8 ha)
- Built: 1854
- Architectural style: Greek Revival
- NRHP reference No.: 82002363
- Added to NRHP: August 31, 1982

Cool Spring Presbyterian Church is a historic Presbyterian church building located near Lewes, Sussex County, Delaware. It was built in 1854, and is on the site of two previous church buildings that served the congregation dating back to its establishment in 1726. It is a one-story, frame structure, three bays deep, in a rural Greek Revival style. It sits on a brick foundation and has a gable roof. It features a simple pedimented portico supported by two Doric order columns. The churchyard was officially granted to the congregation in 1737 by Governor Thomas Penn.

It was added to the National Register of Historic Places in 1976.

== Gallery ==
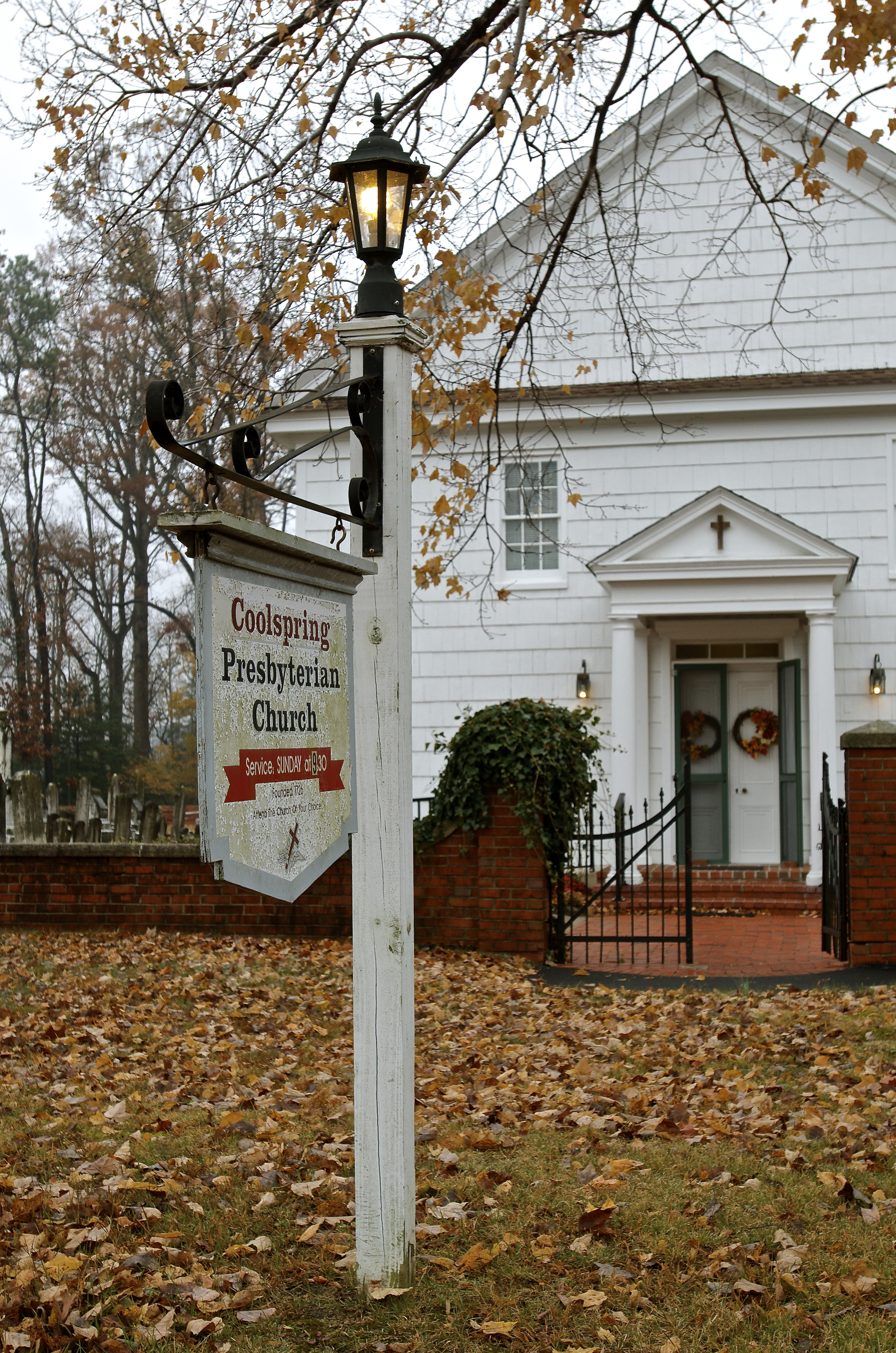
Church sign

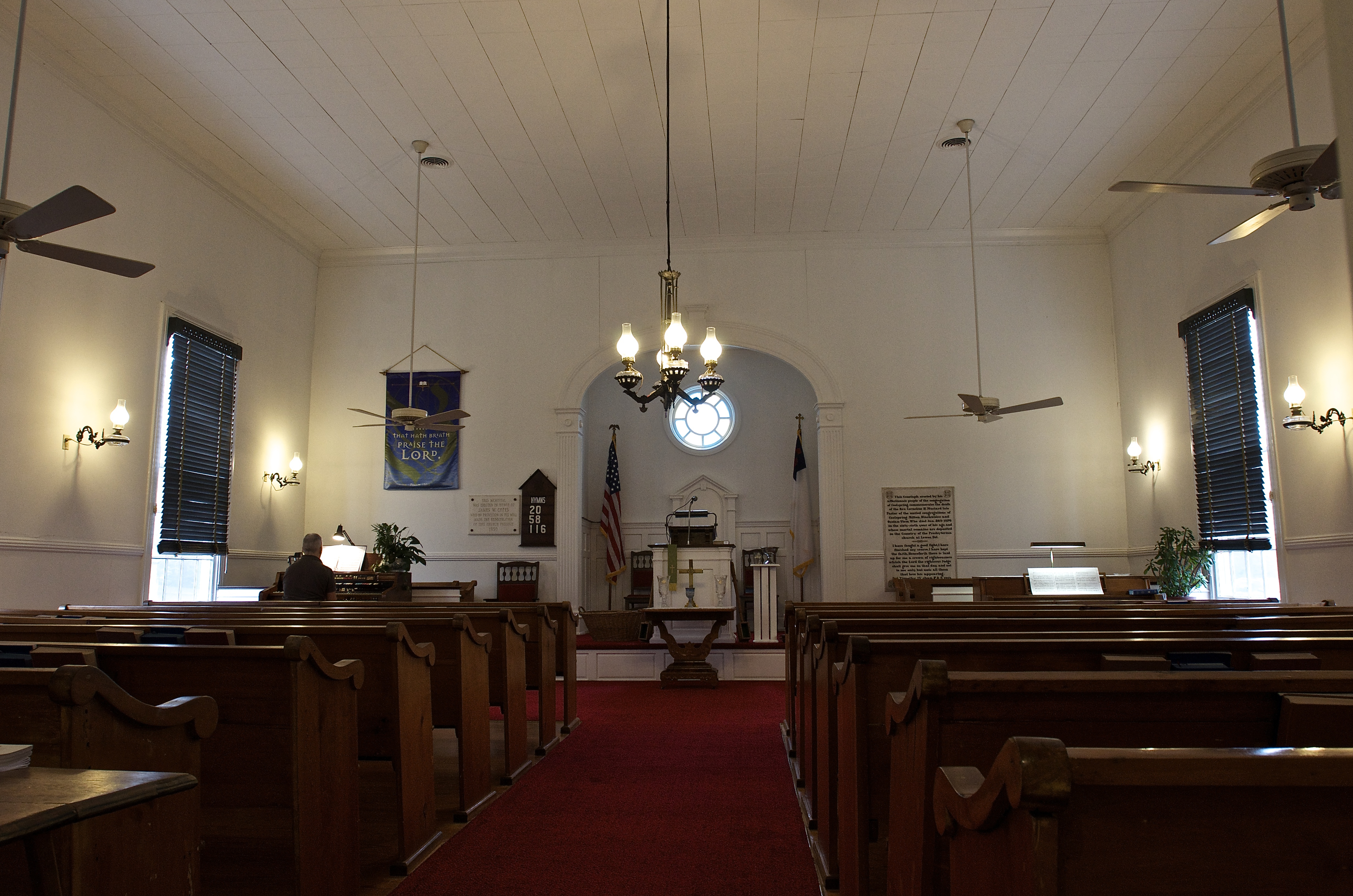
Inside of the church
