= New Castle Presbyterian Church =

Church in New Castle, Delaware, USA

Coordinates: 39.659643°N 75.562727°W

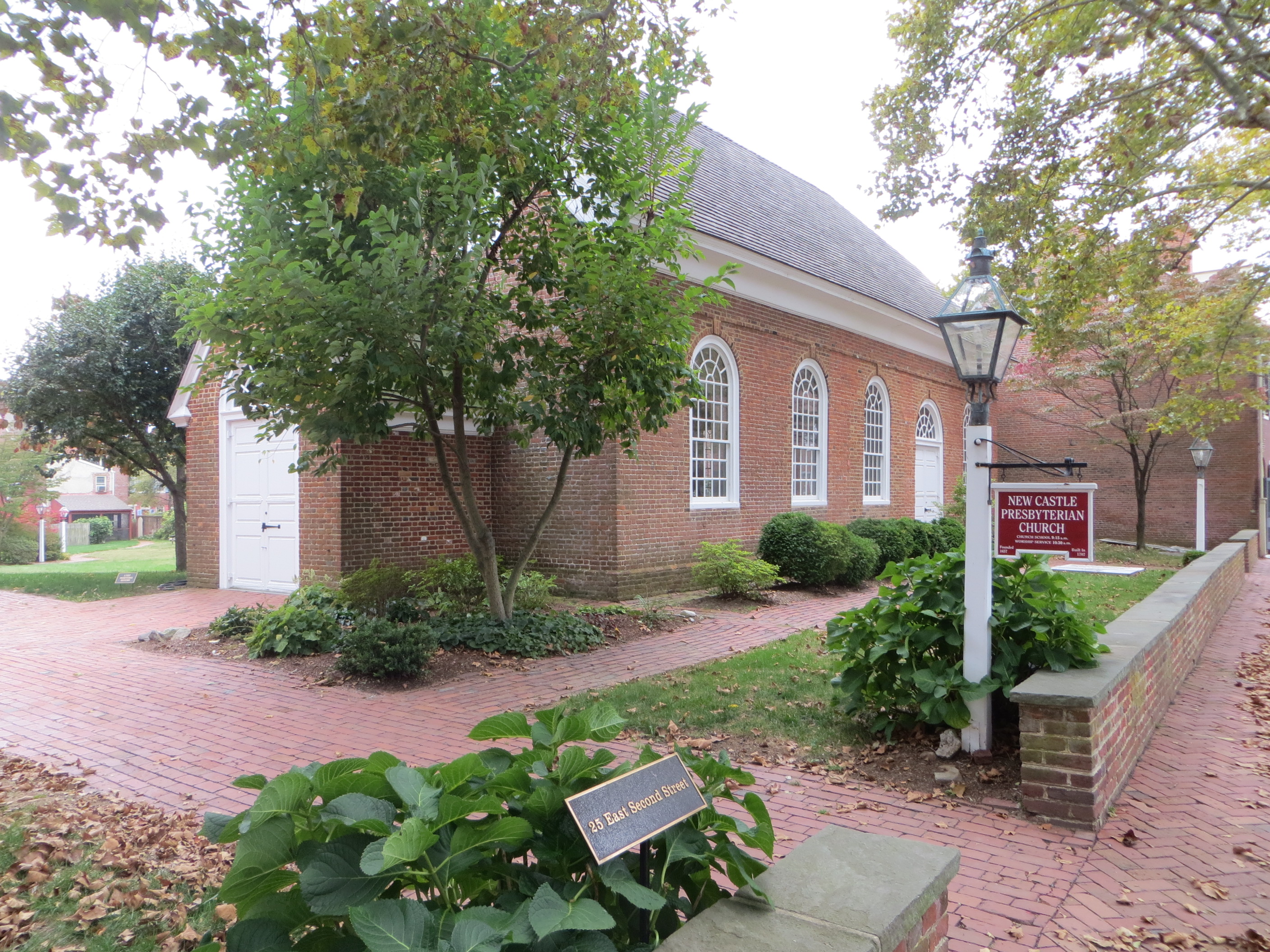
New Castle Presbyterian Church, New Castle, Delaware

New Castle Presbyterian Church is a Presbyterian Church (USA) congregation located in New Castle, Delaware, which conducts worship services weekly in a historic meeting house, which was erected in 1707.

It was founded as a Dutch Reformed Church in 1657 because a clergyman of that faith had accompanied Peter Stuyvesant when building Fort Casimir in 1651. The founding date of the congregation was marked by the arrival of the first permanent pastor for the congregation, Reverend Evardus Welius on August 21, 1657.

By 1664, the British had taken control of the colony from the Dutch, leading to an increase in French Huguenot, English, and Scottish colonists taking residence within the town. Upon the arrival of Rev. John Wilson, a Scotsman, the church took on its distinctive Presbyterian form.

Francis Makemie, Rev. John Wilson, and six other ministers met in Philadelphia in 1706 to organize the first Presbytery in the New World.
