= Lebanon Presbyterian Church =

Historic church in Mississippi, United States

- U.S. National Register of Historic Places
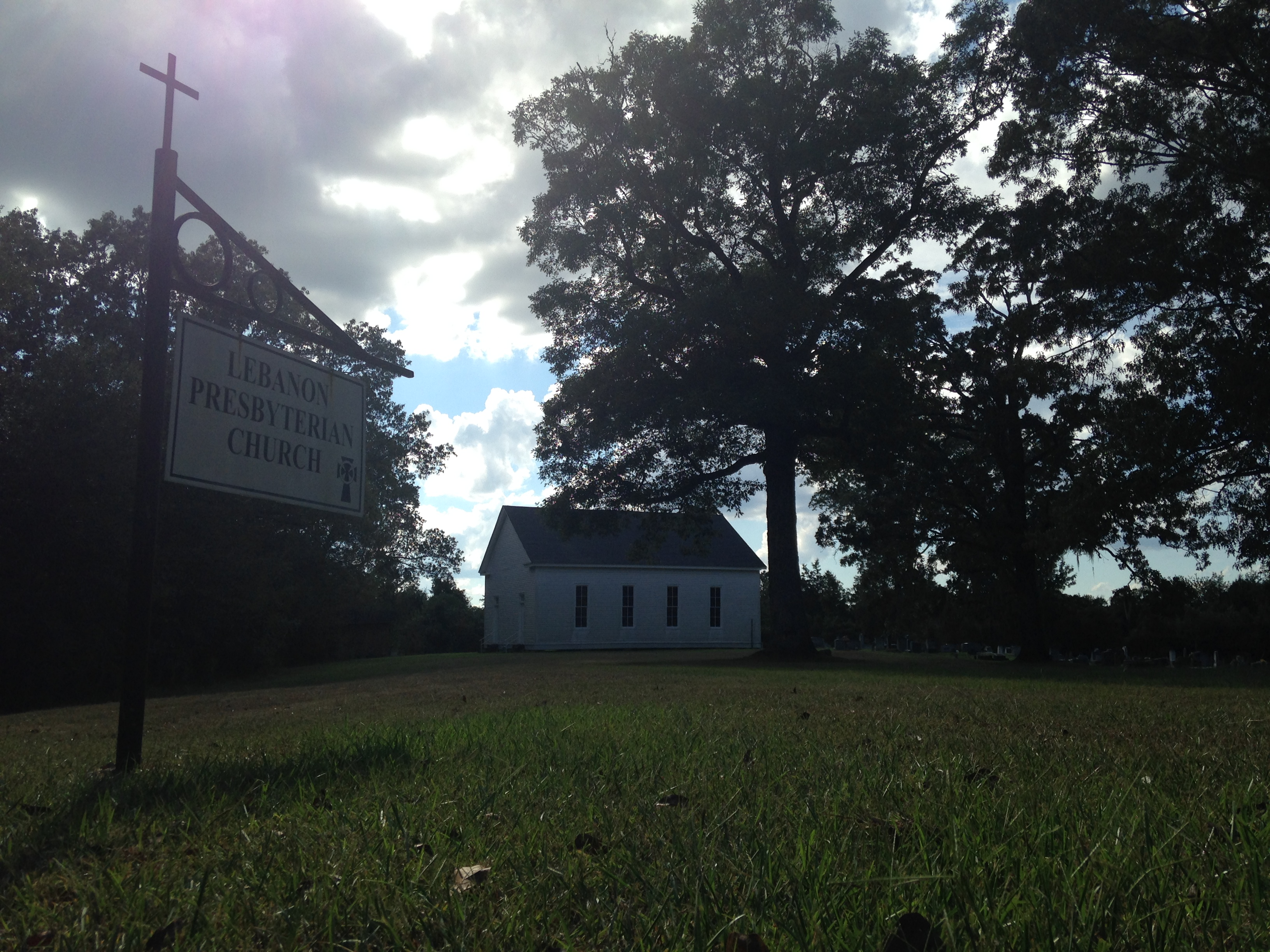

- Location within Mississippi Location within the United States
- Location: Lebanon Presbyterian Church Rd., Utica, Mississippi
- Coordinates: 32°8′55″N 90°31′22″W
- Area: 4.5 acres (1.8 ha)
- Built: 1836
- Architectural style: Mid 19th Century Revival
- NRHP reference No.: 99001359
- Added to NRHP: November 18, 1999

Lebanon Presbyterian Church is a historic church on Lebanon Presbyterian Church Road in Utica, Mississippi. It was built in 1836 and added to the National Register in 1999. Lebanon Presbyterian Church is a member of the Presbyterian Church in America.
