= Mount Olivet Cumberland Presbyterian Church =

Historic church in Kentucky, United States

- U.S. National Register of Historic Places
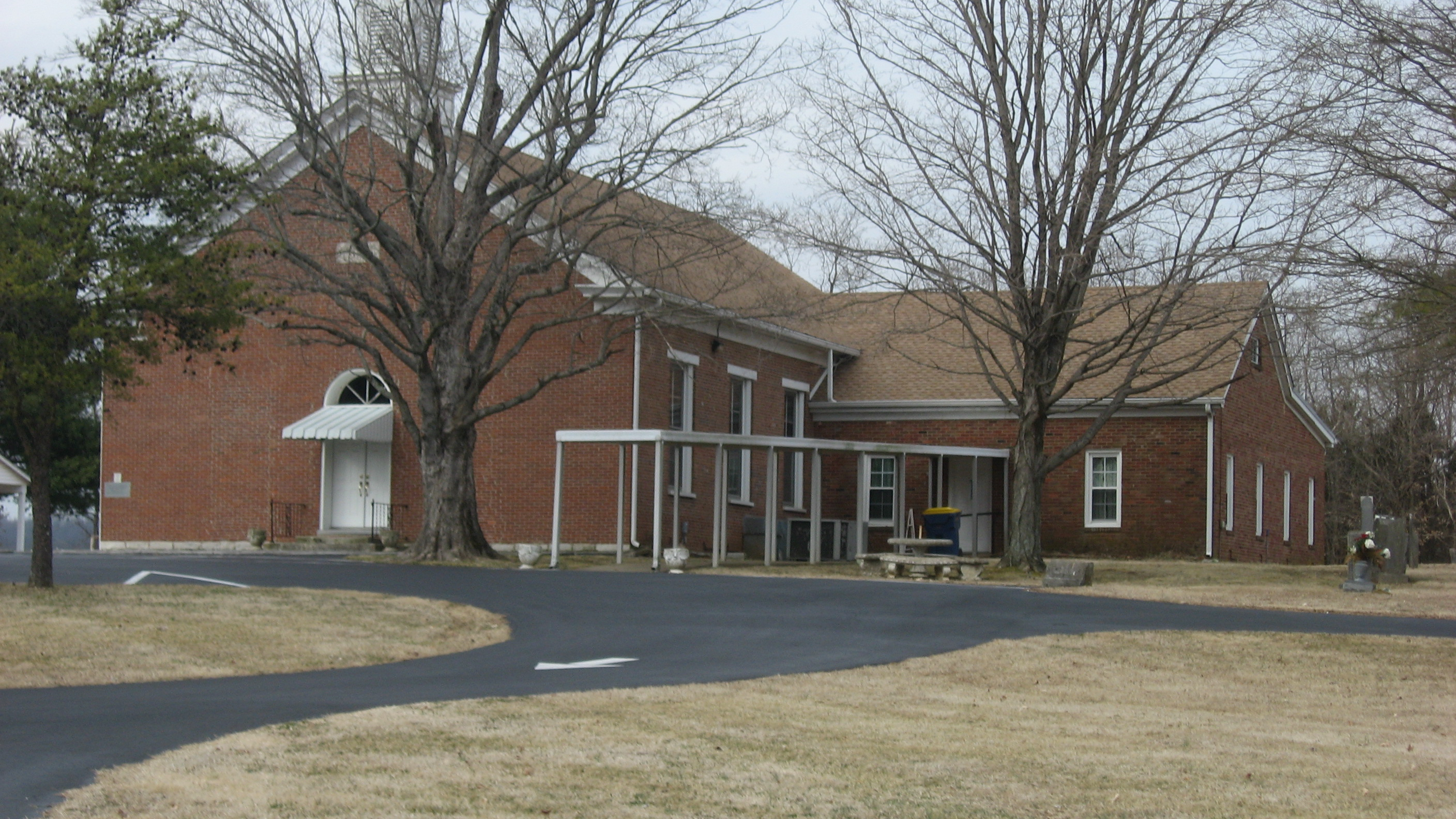
- Front and eastern side

- Location within Kentucky Location within the United States
- Location: SR 526, Bowling Green, Kentucky
- Coordinates: 37°3′5″N 86°22′48″W
- Area: 1 acre (0.40 ha)
- Built: 1845
- Architectural style: Greek Revival
- MPS: Warren County MRA
- NRHP reference No.: 79003529
- Added to NRHP: December 18, 1979

Mount Olivet Cumberland Presbyterian Church is a historic church on Kentucky Route 526 in Bowling Green, Kentucky. It was built in 1845 and added to the National Register in 1979.

It is a gable-front brick building, with brick laid in common bond.

The land on which it was built was a camp meeting site during the early 1800s, as part of the Second Great Awakening.
