= Oxford Presbyterian Church =

Historic church in Indiana, United States

- Presbyterian Church Building
- U.S. National Register of Historic Places
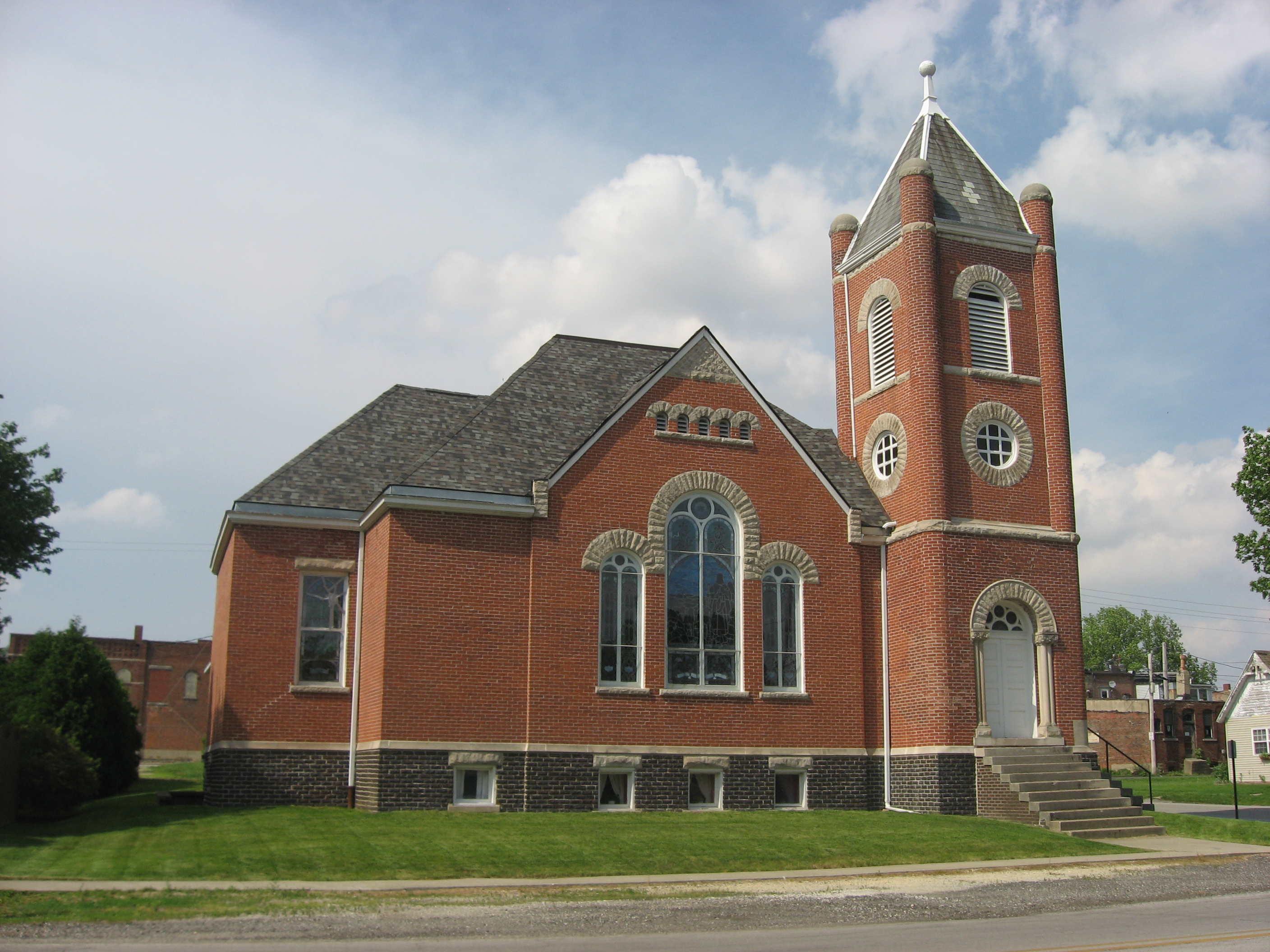
- Front of the church

- Location within Benton County, Indiana Location within Indiana Location within the United States
- Location: NW of Benton and Justus Sts., Oxford, Indiana
- Coordinates: 40°31′8″N 87°15′2″W
- Area: less than one acre
- Built: 1902
- Built by: Steele Brothers
- Architect: Sharpe, W. F.
- Architectural style: Romanesque Revival
- NRHP reference No.: 84000997
- Added to NRHP: March 1, 1984

The Oxford Presbyterian Church is a historic Presbyterian church located at Oxford, Indiana, USA. Its congregation originated as an offshoot of Central Presbyterian Church of Lafayette, Indiana. At the time of its establishment, there were two separate churches, First and Second Presabyterian Churches of Lafayette. In 1914, they merged as Central Presbyterian. The church was built in 1902 and is a 1½-story, Romanesque Revival style brick building with a gable / hipped roof. It features a three-story, square corner tower with a pyramidal roof.

It was listed on the National Register of Historic Places as Presbyterian Church Building in 1984.

The former church has been preserved as a community center and local history museum known as Oak Grove Heritage House.
