= Red Clay Creek Presbyterian Church =

Historic church in Delaware, US

- U.S. National Register of Historic Places
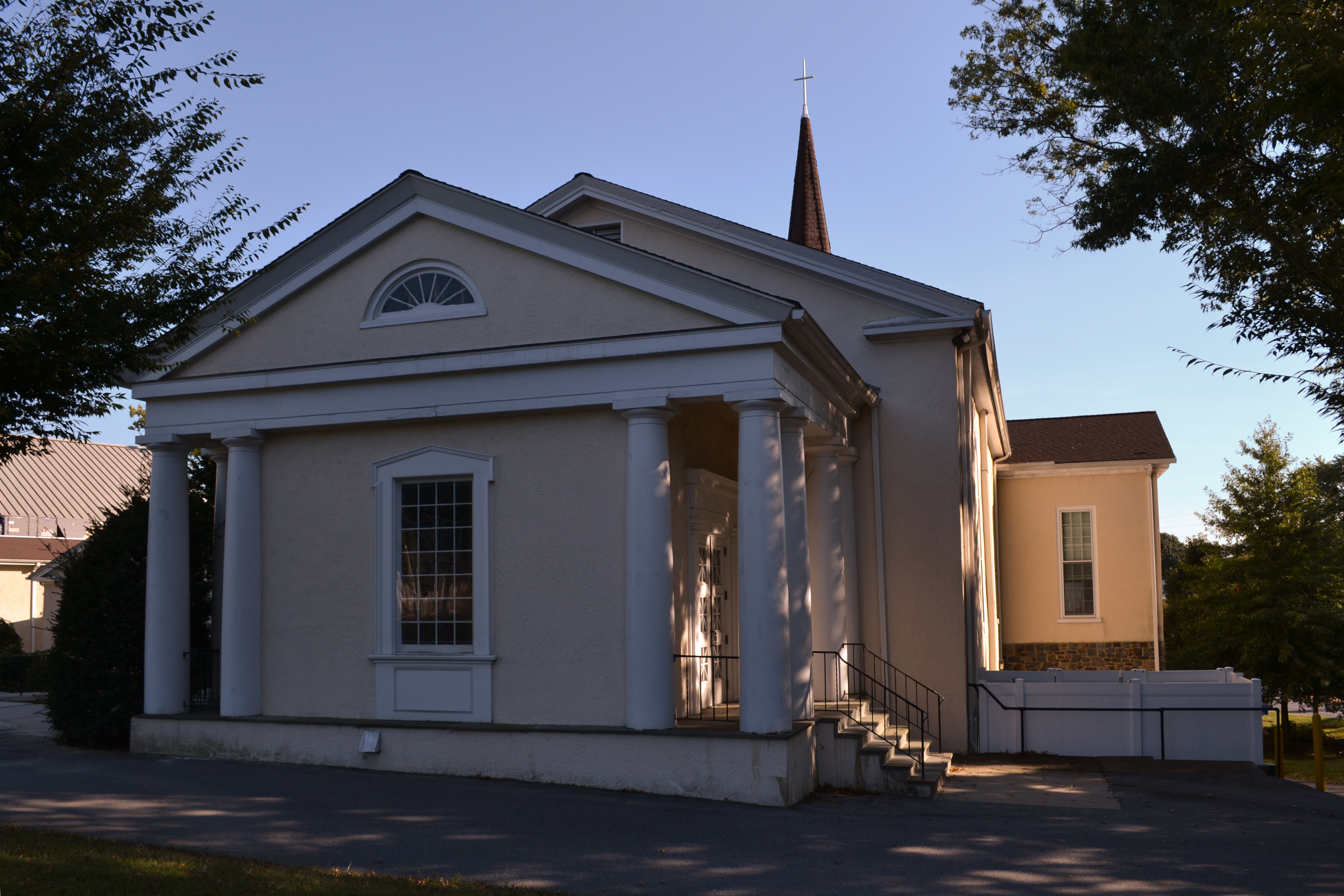
- Red Clay Creek Church, September 2015

- Location within Delaware Location within the United States
- Location: 500 McKennans Church Rd., near Newport, Delaware
- Coordinates: 39°45′7″N 75°39′35″W
- Area: 1 acre (0.40 ha)
- Built: 1853
- Architectural style: Greek Revival
- NRHP reference No.: 73000532
- Added to NRHP: April 11, 1973

Red Clay Creek Presbyterian Church, also known as McKennan's Church, is a historic Presbyterian church located at Mill Creek and McKennan's Church Roads near Newark in New Castle County, Delaware, United States. It was built in 1853, and is a two-story, stuccoed stone structure. It was originally rectangular in plan, but additions have given it an irregular cruciform shape. It features a colonnaded porch in the Greek Revival style with a fanlight and an enclosed vestibule. The south wall incorporates a date stone from the original church building, marked "WM 1761".

It was added to the National Register of Historic Places in 1973.
