= First Presbyterian Church (Jacksonville, Alabama) =

Historic church in Alabama, United States

- U.S. National Register of Historic Places
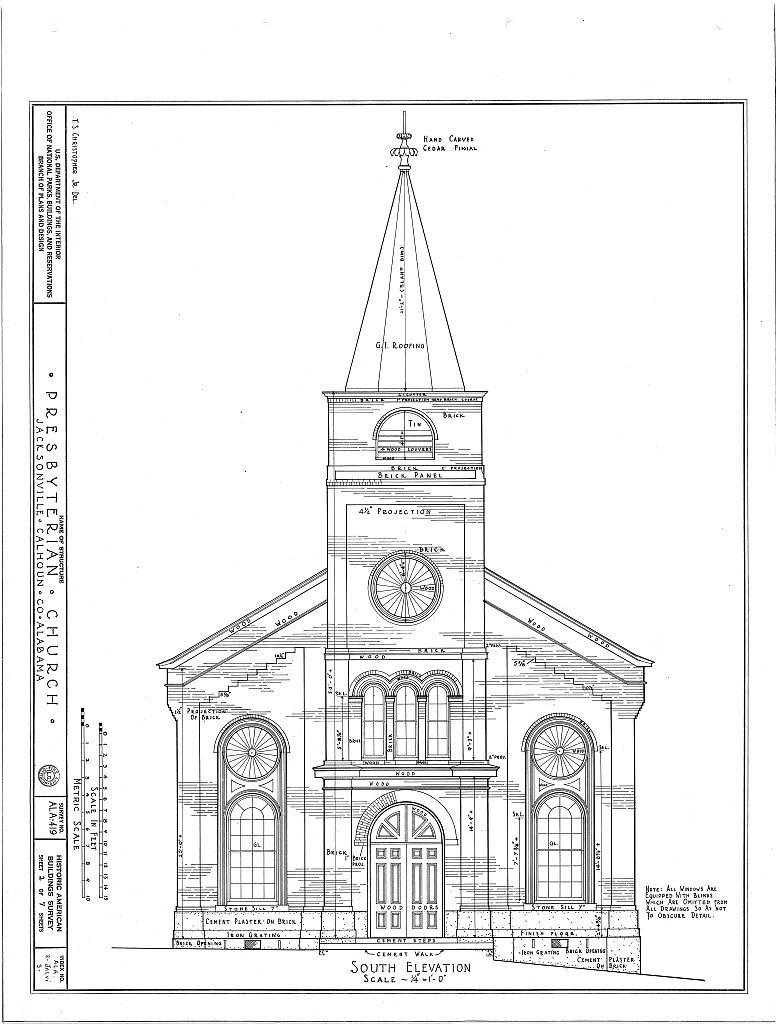

- Location within Alabama Location within the United States
- Location: 200 E. Clinton St., Jacksonville, Alabama
- Coordinates: 33°48′52″N 85°45′37″W
- Area: less than one acre
- Built: 1859
- Architect: possibly John S. Stewart
- Architectural style: Romanesque
- NRHP reference No.: 82001999
- Added to NRHP: February 4, 1982

First Presbyterian Church is a historic church at 200 E. Clinton Street in Jacksonville, Alabama, United States. It was built in 1859 and added to the National Register of Historic Places in 1982.

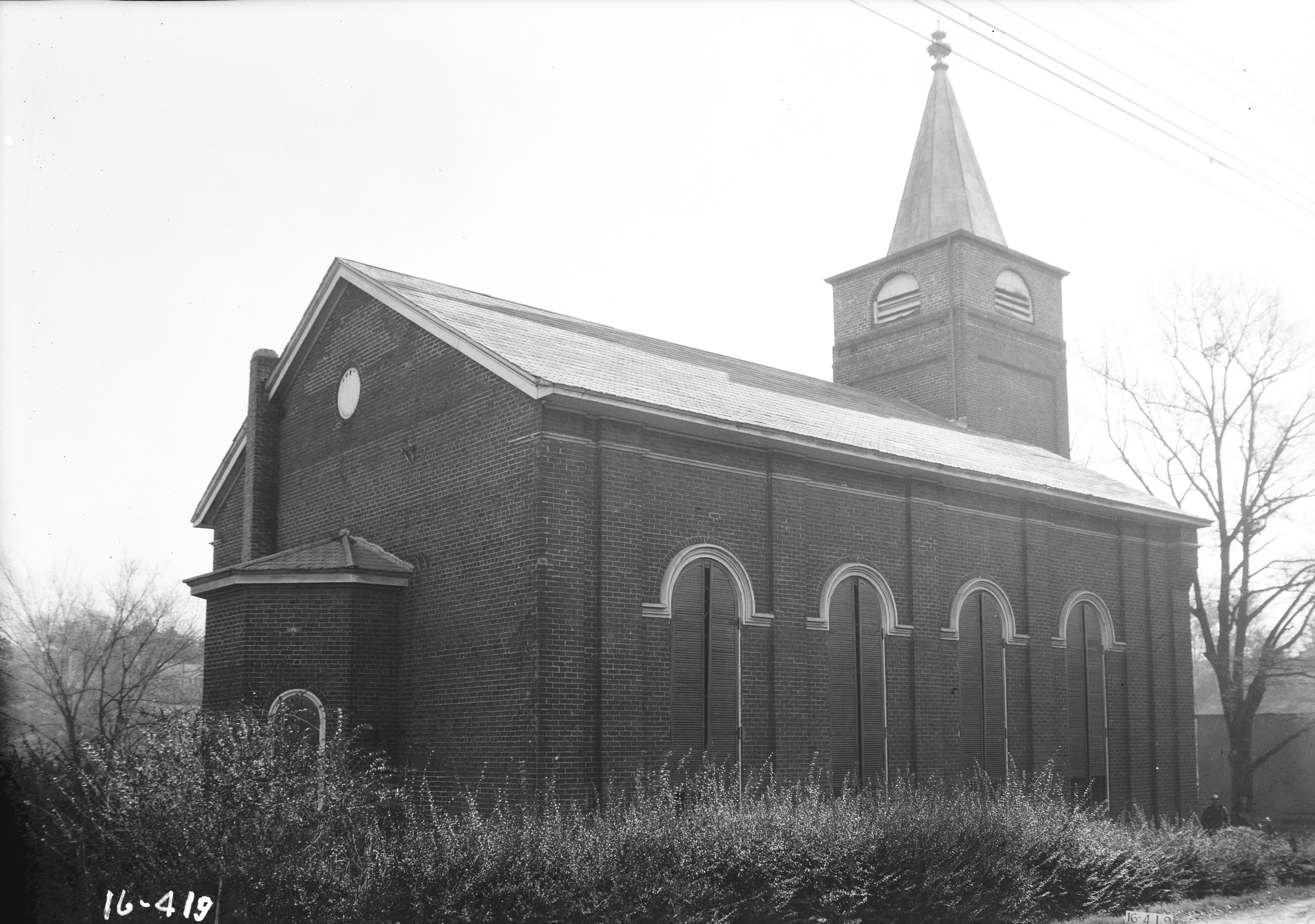
1935

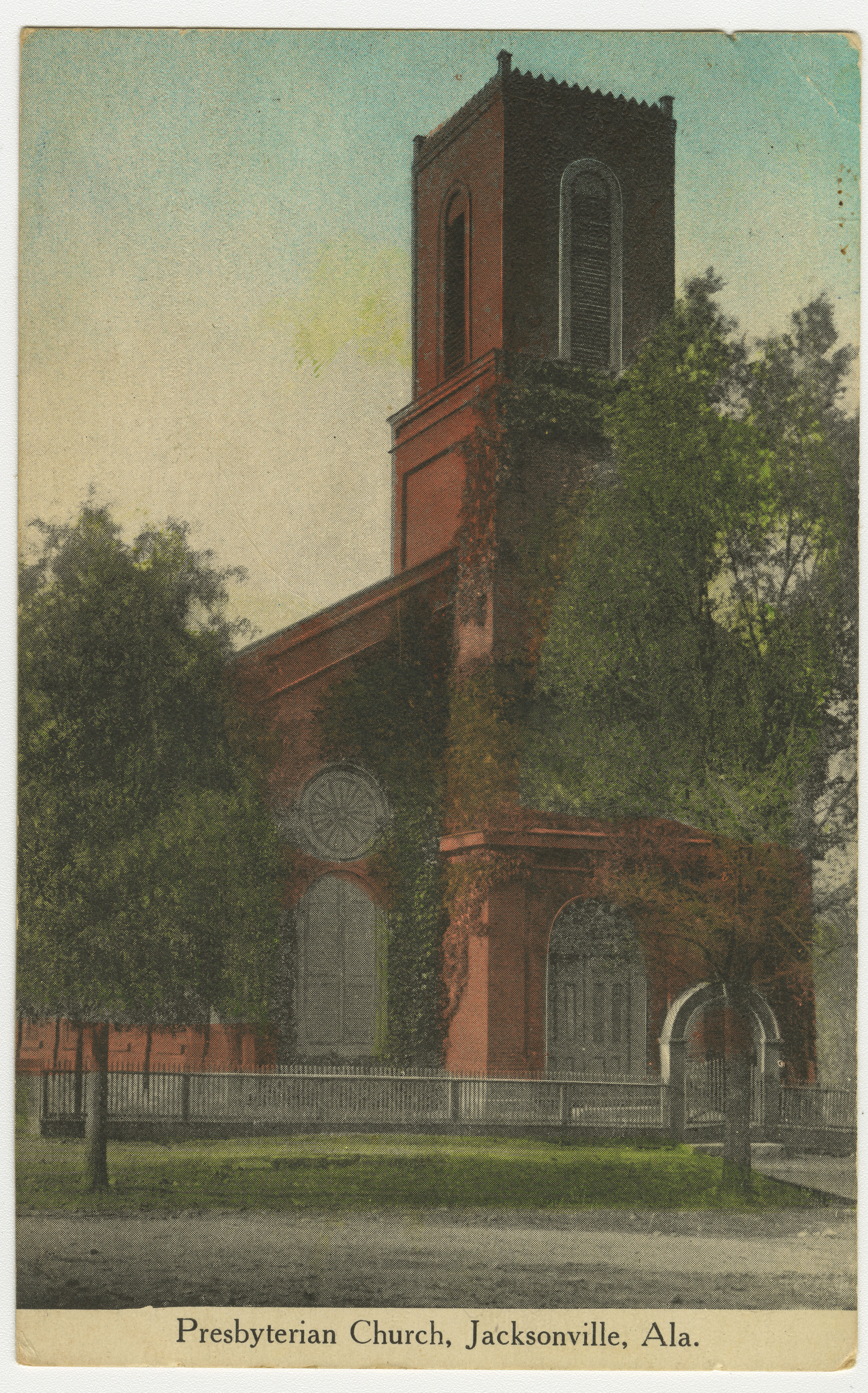
On an early postcard
