= Flemington Presbyterian Church =

Historic church in Georgia, United States

- U.S. National Register of Historic Places
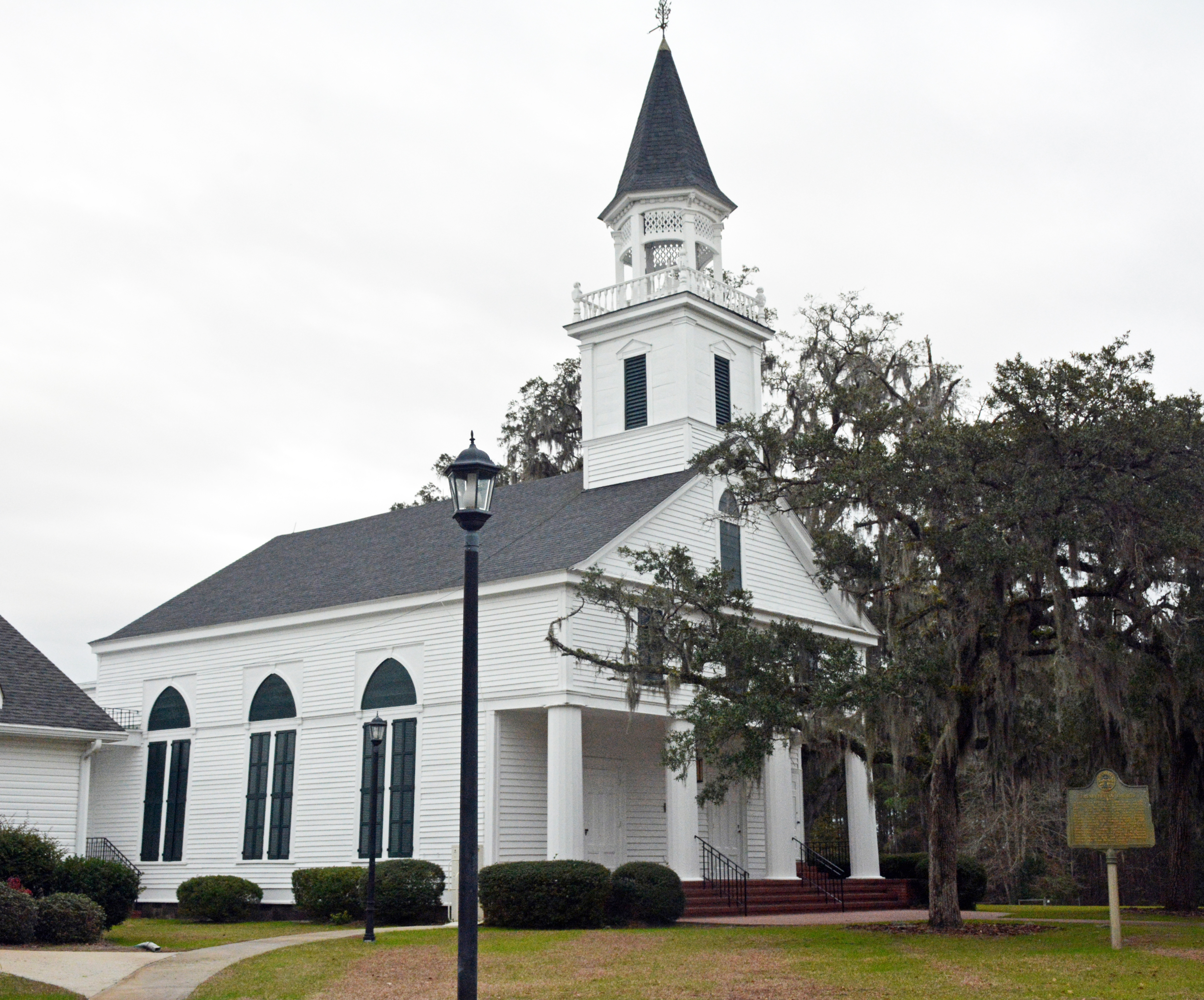

- Location within Georgia Location within the United States
- Location: Off Old Sunbury Rd., Flemington, Georgia
- Coordinates: 31.86968°N 81.57091°W
- Area: 20 acres (8.1 ha)
- Built: 1851
- Architect: T.Q. Cassells; Irwin Rahn (steeple)
- Architectural style: Greek Revival
- NRHP reference No.: 82002449
- Added to NRHP: June 17, 1982

Flemington Presbyterian Church is a historic church off Old Sunbury Road in Flemington, Georgia. It was built in 1851 in the Greek Revival style. It is made mainly of yellow pine and is on a brick pier foundation. The church's bell was originally used at the Midway, Georgia church and was given to this church shortly after it was completed. The walls are plastered and the floors are pine. There are three original 1887 mahogany chairs behind the pulpit. The second floor gallery was originally used by slaves and later by freed men. It was added to the National Register of Historic Places in 1982.
