= Rock Hill Presbyterian Church =

Historic church in Ohio, United States

- U.S. National Register of Historic Places
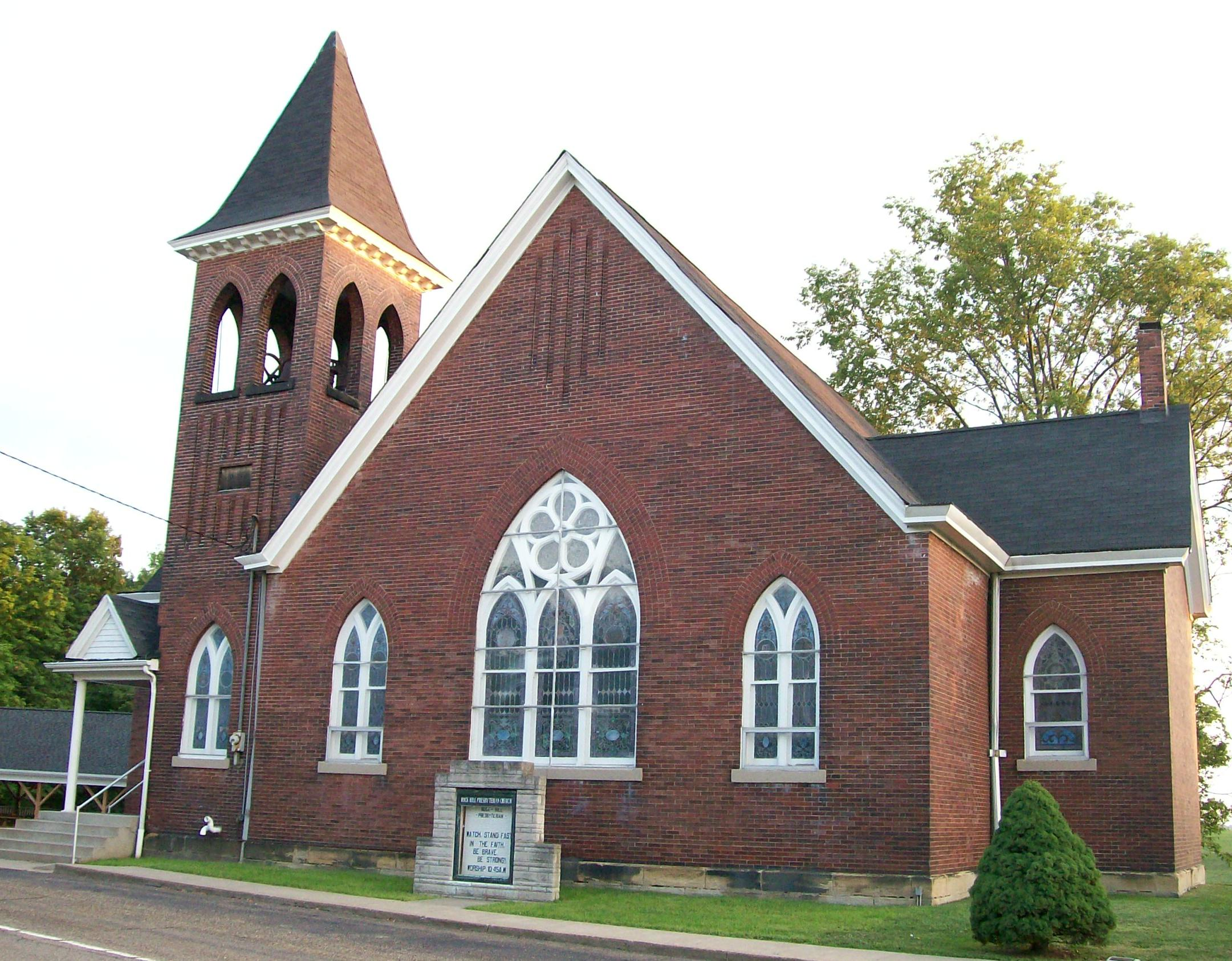
- The Rock Hill Presbyterian Church northwest of Bellaire, Ohio.

- Location within Ohio Location within the United States
- Location: 52644 High Ridge Road, Bellaire, Ohio
- Nearest city: Bellaire, Ohio
- Coordinates: 40°2′15″N 80°46′22″W
- Built: 1903
- Architect: Giffin, George D. and Co.
- Architectural style: Late Gothic Revival
- NRHP reference No.: 09000169
- Added to NRHP: February 18, 2009

Rock Hill Presbyterian Church is located at 52644 High Ridge Road in Bellaire, Ohio. The building was placed on the National Register on 2009-02-18.

== History ==
The Presbyterians first built a church on the site in the 1800s to house their congregation. It was a simple structure compared to the current one. The first church was destroyed by fire in 1895. The congregation began planning a larger, more elaborate church soon after but nothing was constructed until 1903. The current building, which is still used today, was built in 1903 and was designed by Belmont County native George D. Giffin, whose father, Hugh Giffin, worshipped with the Rock Hill Presbyterian Church. The building cost $13,000 to produce.

== Exterior ==
The church is constructed of red brick with white wooden trim around the doors and windows. The church is designed in the shape of a cross with various entrances jutting from the basic form. The large hipped roof is supported by an entablature with dentil molding. Two large chimneys jut from the roofs along the northern and southern wings. The entrance is located in the large bell tower at the front of the building. The tower contains four pairs of arched openings supporting a large spire. A large bell hangs from a mounting in the tower.

== Interior ==
The interior is illuminated by large stained glass windows, which are protected by a second plain window. The interior floor plan was designed in an auditorium style layout. The original oak pews are arranged in concentric arches to let people better hear and see the preacher.
