= Cane Ridge Cumberland Presbyterian Church =

Historic church in Tennessee, United States

- U.S. National Register of Historic Places
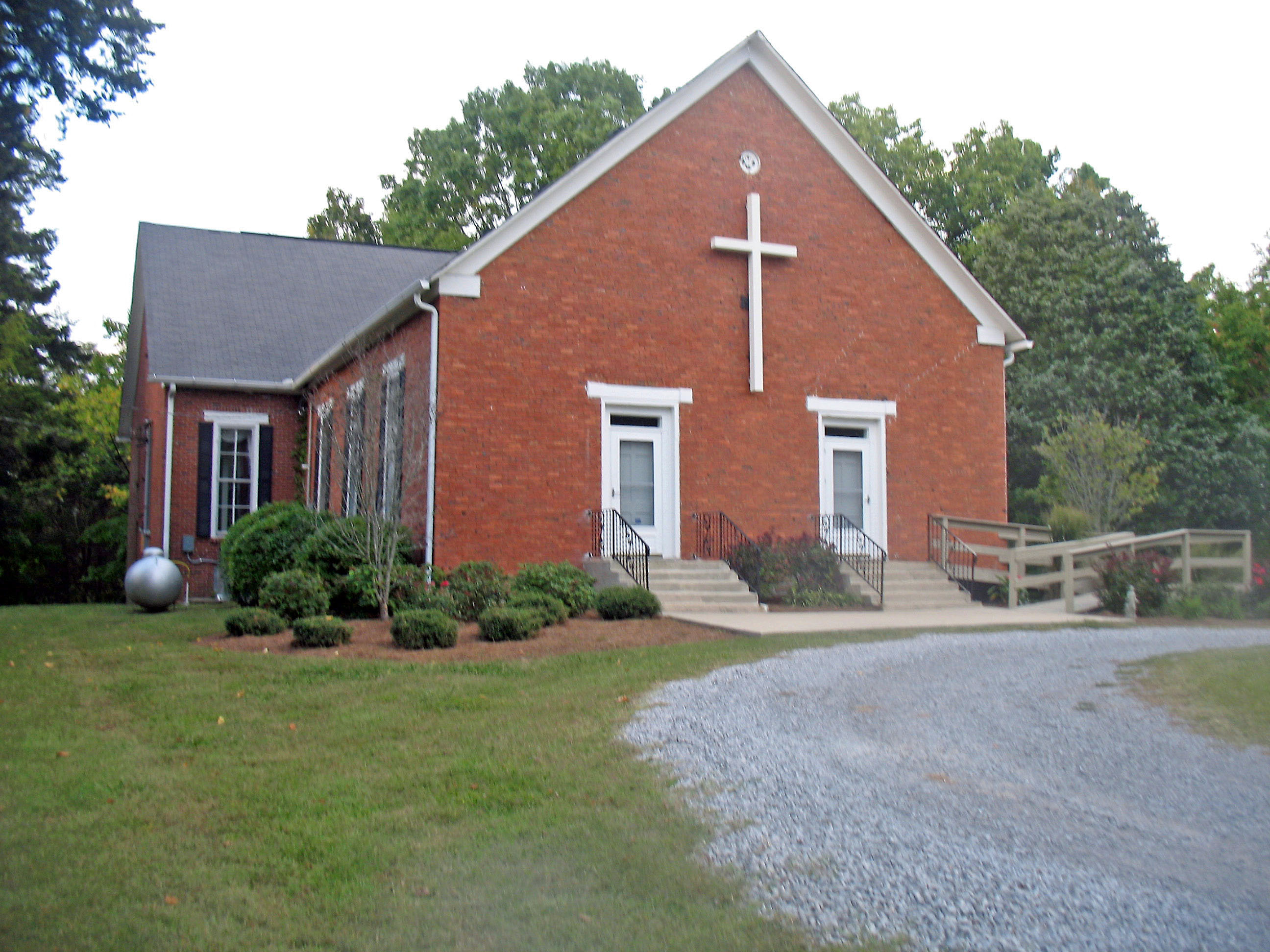

- Location within Tennessee Location within the United States
- Nearest city: Antioch, Tennessee
- Coordinates: 36°0′6″N 86°38′2″W
- Area: 4 acres (1.6 ha)
- Built: 1859
- NRHP reference No.: 76001770
- Added to NRHP: December 12, 1976

Cane Ridge Cumberland Presbyterian Church is a historic church in Antioch, Tennessee.

It was built in 1859 and added to the National Register in 1976.
