= Sand Spring Presbyterian Church =

Historic church in Mississippi, United States

- U.S. National Register of Historic Places
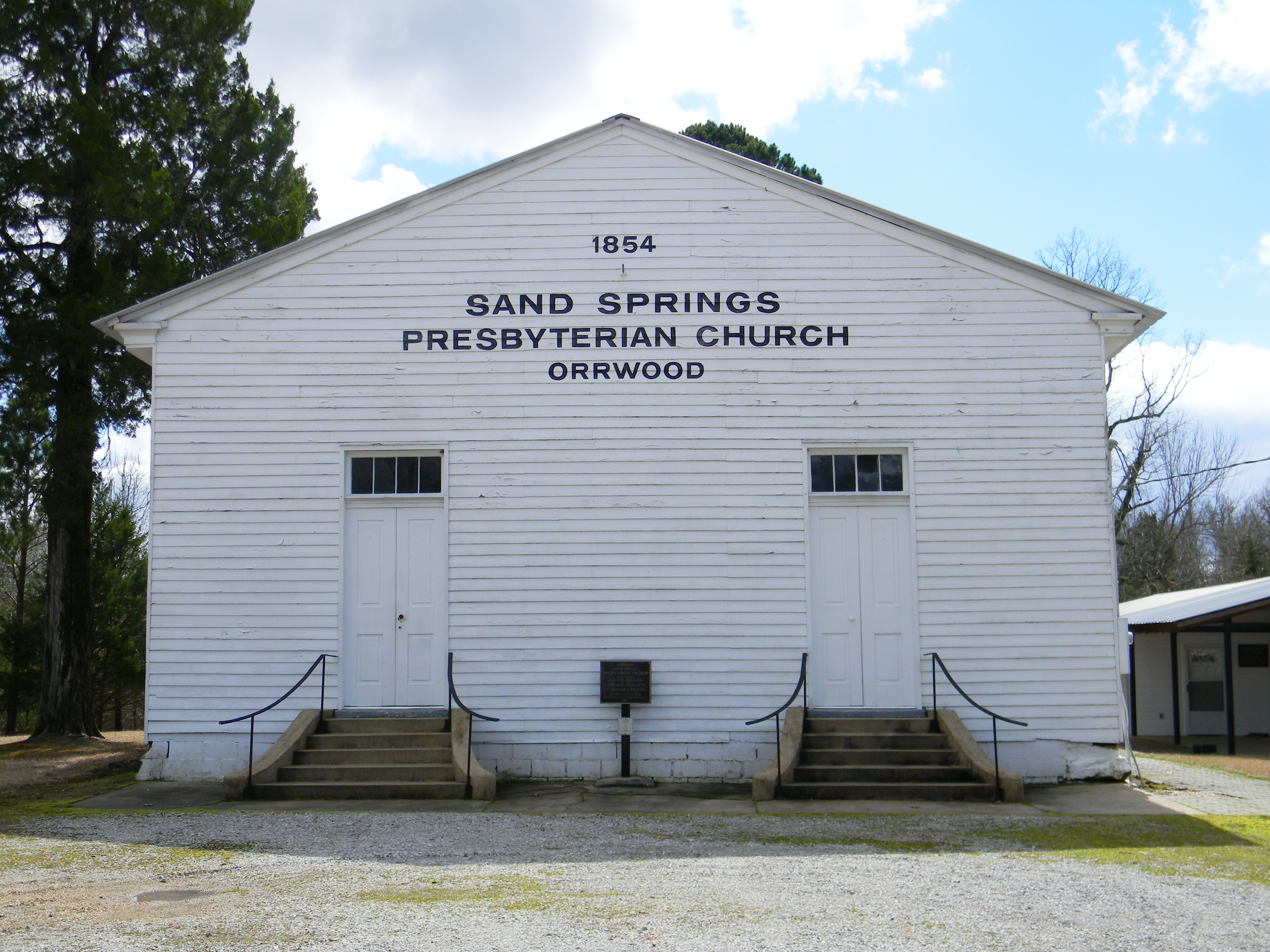
- Sand Spring Presbyterian Church, Orwood, MS, USA.

- Location within Mississippi Location within the United States
- Nearest city: Water Valley, Mississippi
- Coordinates: 34°15′24″N 89°42′55″W
- Area: 1.4 acres (0.57 ha)
- Built: 1854
- Architect: William Turner
- Architectural style: Vernacular rural church
- NRHP reference No.: 93000083
- Added to NRHP: February 25, 1993

Sand Spring Presbyterian Church is a historic church in Water Valley, Mississippi.

It was built in 1854 and added to the National Register of Historic Places in 1993. The church is also registered by the Presbyterian Historical Society under the American Presbyterian/Reformed Historical Sites Registry as Site No. 371.

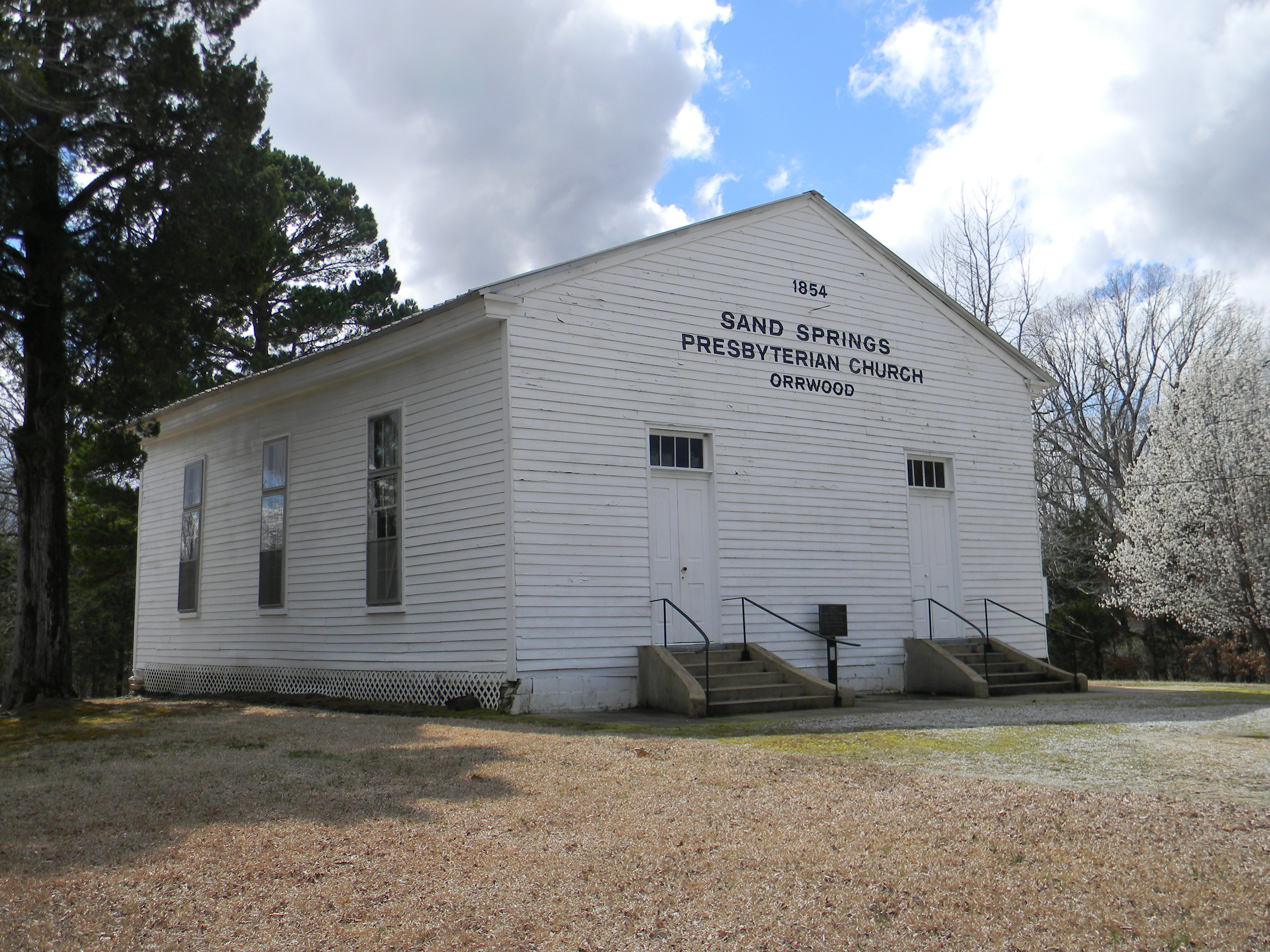
Left side

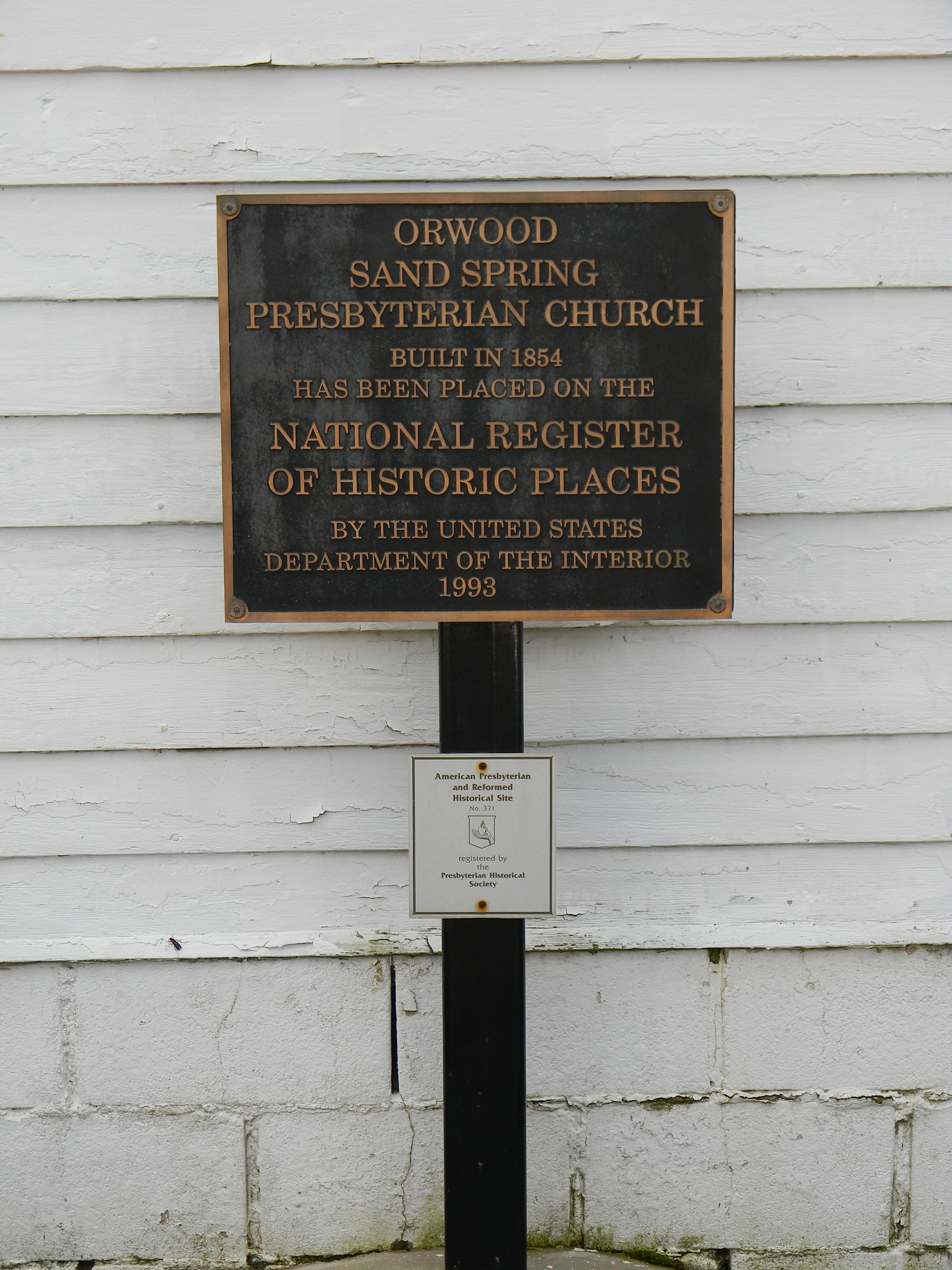
NRHP marker
