= Buffalo Presbyterian Church (Montello, Wisconsin) =

Church in Wisconsin

- Buffalo Presbyterian Church
- 43.672572°N 89.360962°W
- Address: Montello, Wisconsin

The Buffalo Presbyterian Church is a historic church in Montello, Wisconsin that was formally organized on June 6, 1858. Its building, also known as the Wee White Kirk, was built in 1865 and is listed as Site Number 102 of the American Presbyterian/Reformed Historic Sites Registry.

== History ==
Scottish settlers organized the Buffalo Associate Presbyterian Church in 1852. The church was founded on June 6, 1858 by Reverend S. H. Barteau with twelve members under the Presbyterian and Congregational General Convention of Wisconsin. The church did not have a regular minister for six months until Barteau was hired for the subsequent six months. The church was without a regular minister for several more months until Reverend A. C. Lathrop became minister for two years. After the 18-month tenure of Reverend L. Parker from March 1862 to September 1863, there was no regular minister between September 1863 to June 1868. The Presbytery of Wisconsin (under the United Presbyterian Church of North America) was founded here on October 12, 1864. The congregation was dissolved in 1905.

The church building was built in 1865. The Buffalo United Presbyterian Cemetery Association maintains the property.
