= New Derry, Pennsylvania =

Unincorporated community in Pennsylvania, US

- Unincorporated community
- Location within Pennsylvania
- Coordinates: 40°21′02″N 79°18′59″W
- Country: United States
- State: Pennsylvania
- County: Westmoreland
- Elevation: 1,273 ft (388 m)
- Time zone: UTC-5 (Eastern (EST))
  - Summer (DST): UTC-4 (EDT)
- ZIP code: 15671
- Area code: 724
- GNIS feature ID: 1182307

New Derry is an unincorporated community in Westmoreland County, Pennsylvania, United States. The community is located along Pennsylvania Route 982, 1.5 miles (2.4 km) northwest of Derry. New Derry has a post office, with ZIP code 15671, which opened on February 3, 1823.
