= Red Oak Grove Presbyterian Church and Cemetery =

Historic site in Cedar County, Iowa

- U.S. National Register of Historic Places
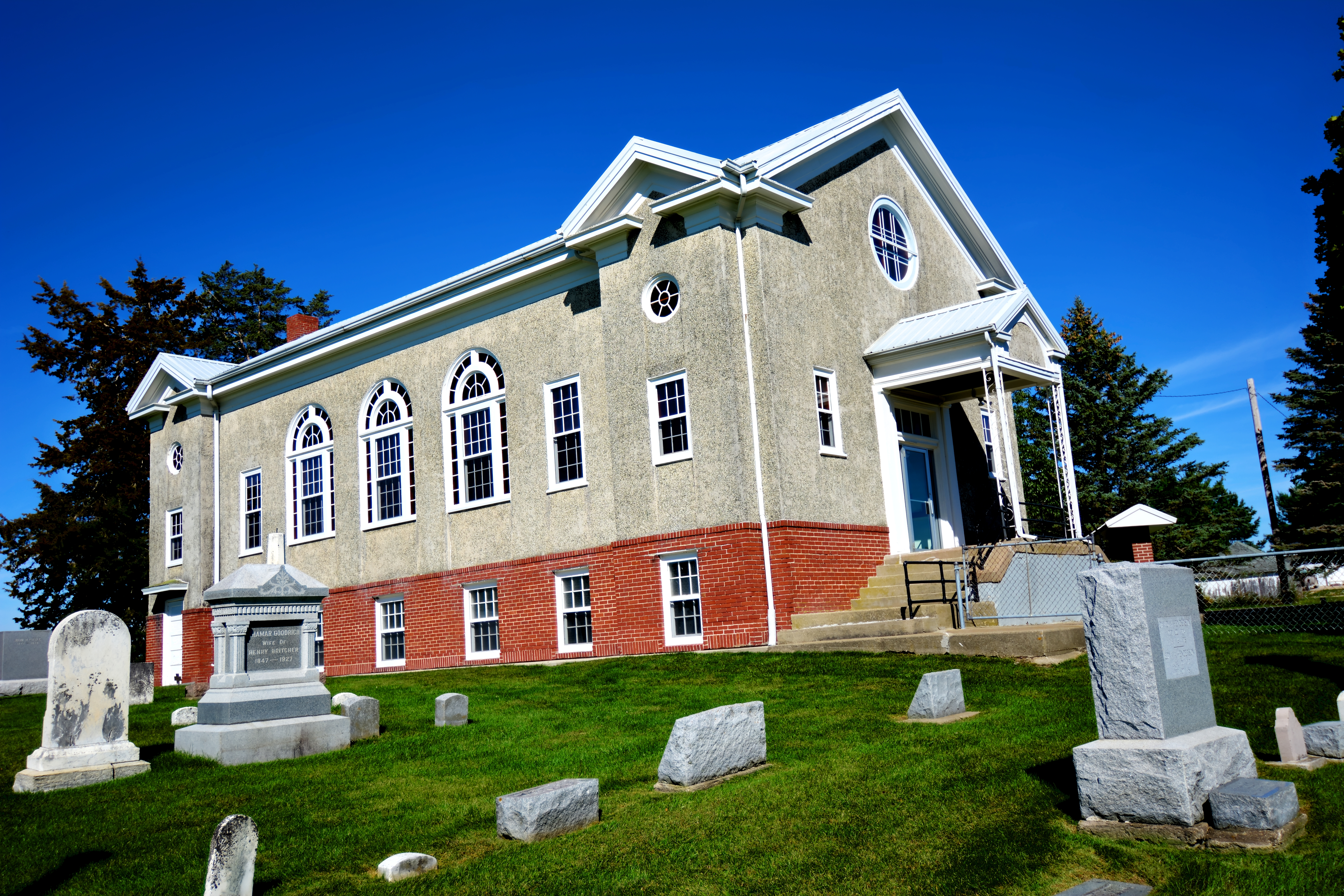

- Location within Iowa Location within the United States
- Location: 751 King Ave. Tipton, Iowa
- Coordinates: 41°50′9.41″N 91°9′25.46″W
- Architect: Rugh and Zalesky
- Architectural style: Classical Revival
- NRHP reference No.: 09001302
- Added to NRHP: February 3, 2010

Red Oak Grove Presbyterian Church and Cemetery is located outside of Tipton, Iowa, United States. They were listed on the National Register of Historic Places in 2010.

== History ==
The congregation was organized on March 1, 1841 by Scotch Presbyterian settlers in Cedar County, Iowa. It is the first Presbyterian Church founded in Cedar County and the twelfth in the state of Iowa. The ten charter members of the church include: Robert Dallas, Miss Sarah Dallas, John and Isabella Ferguson, John Safley, John Chappell, Samuel Yule, Robert and Elizabeth Pirie and Elizabeth Dallas. The organizational meeting was conducted by the Rev. Michael Hummer, who was an itinerant Presbyterian missionary. By November 1847 the congregation grew to 22 members. For the first ten years the congregation had no pastor and was severed by traveling missionaries.

In 1851 the congregation requested that its location be changed to Tipton. The Presbytery granted its permission and it became known as the First Presbyterian Church of Tipton. In the meantime the people in Red Oak Grove built a church and requested a separate organization. The Presbytery granted its request in October 1859, and the Presbyterian Church of Red Oak Grove was organized. The following year the relationship between the churches was dissolved and Red Oak Grove began a working relationship with the Presbyterian Church in Mechanicsville, Iowa.

Henry Britcher donated land north of the church where the present manse was built in 1899. The Rev. J.C. Fawcett was the first pastor to occupy the home in 1901.

== Red Oak Cemetery ==
The North Cemetery was organized in 1848 and the plat was made by A.L. Safley. The South Cemetery was plotted in May 1907.
