= Buffalo Presbyterian Church (Pamplin, Virginia) =

Historic church in Virginia, United States

- U.S. National Register of Historic Places
- Virginia Landmarks Register
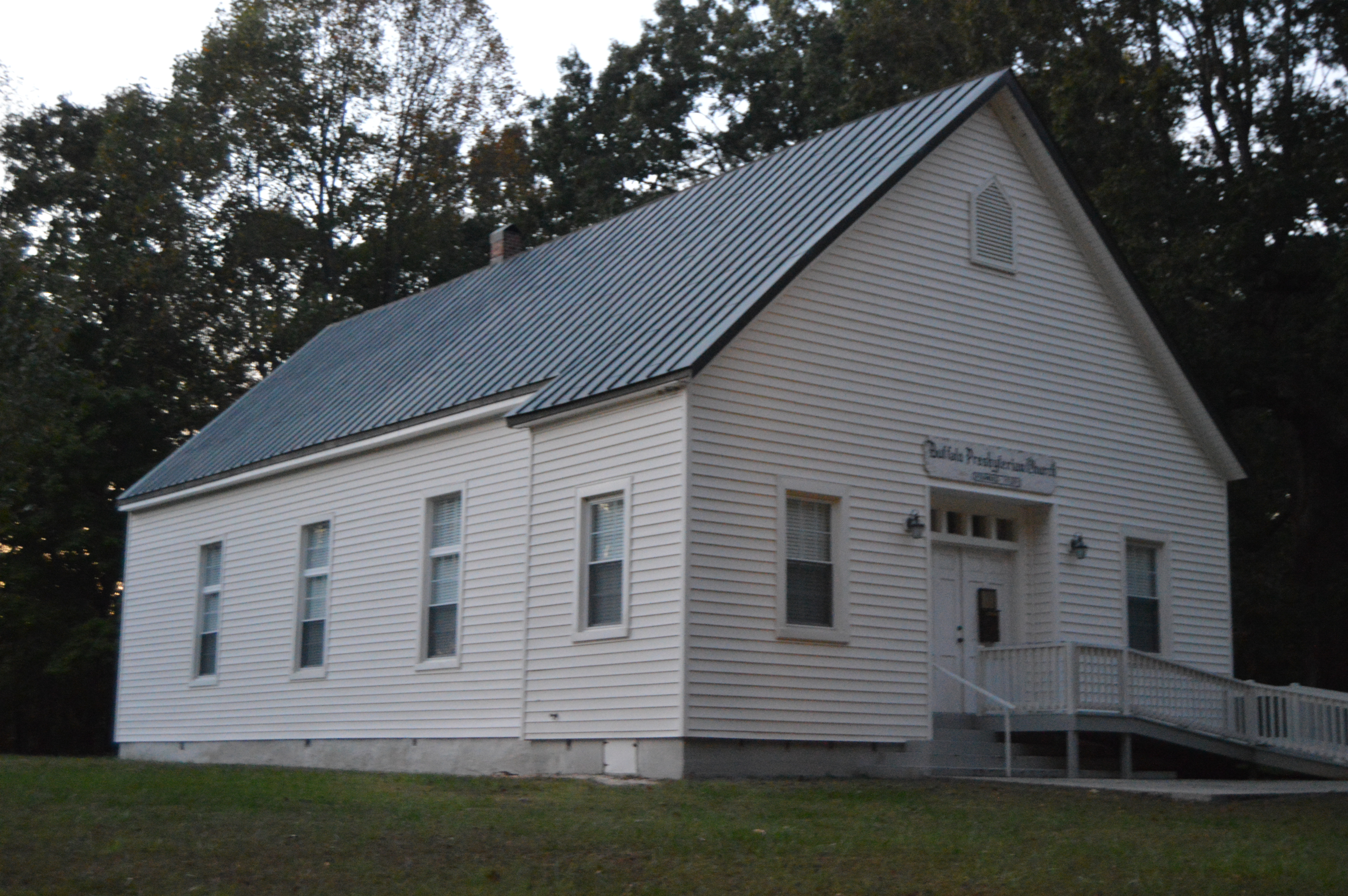
- Front and southern side

- Location within Virginia Location within the United States
- Location: VA 659, 0.3 miles (0.48 km) south of the junction with VA 658, Pamplin, Virginia
- Coordinates: 37°14′25″N 78°36′3″W
- Built: 1804
- Architectural style: Early Republic
- NRHP reference No.: 95000395
- VLR No.: 073-0028

Significant dates
- Added to NRHP: April 07, 1995
- Designated VLR: April 28, 1995

Buffalo Presbyterian Church is a historic Presbyterian Church located in Pamplin, Prince Edward County, Virginia. Built about 1804, it is a simple frame weather-boarded structure with a gable roof covered with standing seam metal. Early in the 20th century the front of the church was reoriented to the east and, in 1931, an addition was made, consisting of an entrance vestibule flanked on either side by a small classroom. Also on the property is the contributing church cemetery, with a number of stone markers, the earliest of which is dated 1832. The congregation of Buffalo was formed in 1739 and is the earliest extant Presbyterian congregation in Southside Virginia.

According to "Pioneer Presbeteryian Congregations", as of 1989, a pulpit space was later added to the back of the building and two rooms were built on the front. The building which once had a gallery for African-Americans is still heated by old wood stoves.

It was listed on the National Register of Historic Places in 1995.

Rev. Richard Sankey began here in 1759, becoming the first installed minister, and building their first log meeting house about one-half mile from the present site. It burned in the 1780s. In 1775, his congregation, at his behest, helped to raise funds in order to create Hampden-Sydney college in 1775. He was honored as the preacher at the opening of the Synod of Virginia in 1788.
