= Buffalo Presbyterian Church and Cemetery =

Historic site in Guilford County, North Carolina

- U.S. National Register of Historic Places
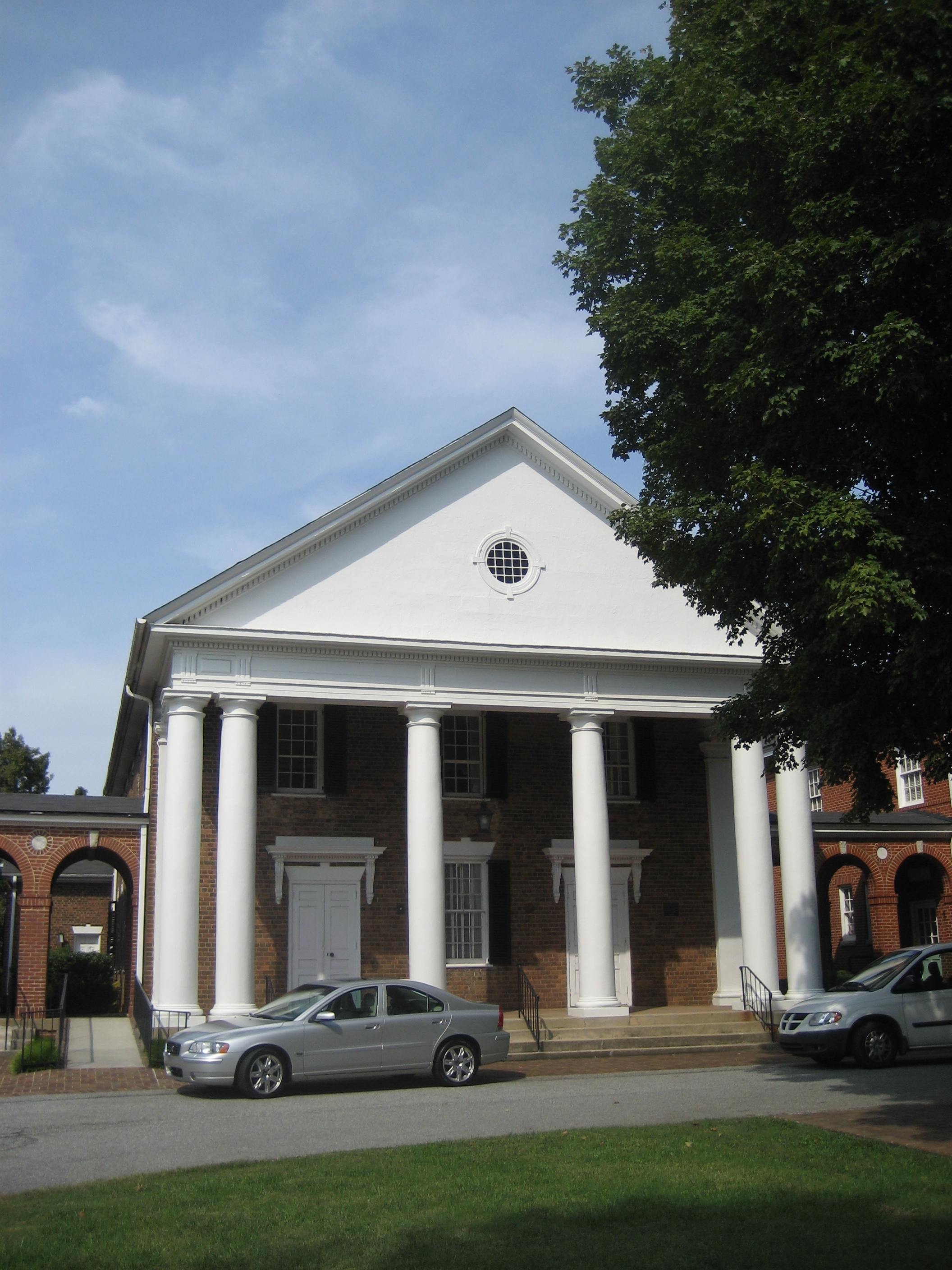

- Location within North Carolina Location within the United States
- Location: 800 and 803 Sixteenth St., Greensboro, North Carolina
- Coordinates: 36°6′33″N 79°46′49″W
- Area: 8 acres (3.2 ha)
- Built: 1775
- Architect: Albright, Jacob; Barton, Harry
- Architectural style: Federal, Colonial Revival
- NRHP reference No.: 02000985
- Added to NRHP: September 16, 2002

The Buffalo Presbyterian Church and Cemetery in Greensboro, Guilford County, North Carolina, United States, is a historic Presbyterian church complex and cemetery located at 800 and 803 Sixteenth Street in Greensboro. The Federal-style church sanctuary was built in 1827, and updated and expanded in 1919–1920 in the Colonial Revival style by architect Harry Barton (1876-1937). It was expanded again in 1956. Flanking the sanctuary are two-story Colonial Revival-style educational buildings linked to it by one-story arcades. The rectangular two-story Colonial Revival-style manse and garage were added to the complex in 1924. The church cemetery has burials dating back to 1775.

It was listed on the National Register of Historic Places in 2002.
