= National Register of Historic Places listings in Abbeville County, South Carolina =

Location of Abbeville County in South Carolina

This is a list of the National Register of Historic Places listings in Abbeville County, South Carolina.

This is intended to be a complete list of the properties and districts on the National Register of Historic Places in Abbeville County, South Carolina. The locations of National Register properties and districts for which the latitude and longitude coordinates are included below, may be seen in a map.

There are 15 properties and districts listed on the National Register in the county, including 1 National Historic Landmark.

This National Park Service list is complete through NPS recent listings posted October 16, 2026.

== Current listings ==
	Name on the Register	Image	Date listed	Location	City or town	Description
1	Abbeville County Courthouse	Abbeville County Courthouse	October 30, 1981 (#81000706)	Court Square; 34°10′41″N 82°22′43″W	Abbeville	
2	Abbeville County Training School	Abbeville County Training School	May 27, 2022 (#100007749)	410 Branch St. 34°10′56″N 82°22′11″W	Abbeville	
3	Abbeville Historic District	Abbeville Historic District	September 14, 1972 (#72001183)	Roughly bounded by the former Seaboard Coast Line tracks, South Carolina Highway 72, Rickey, Haight, Hemphill, and Haigler Sts.; also roughly east of Magazine St., south of Whitehall St., northwest along Long Branch St., west of Lemon St., and north along Washington St.; also roughly west along N. Main St. from Haigler to Livingston Sts., north along Greenville St., and northeast on Marshall Ct. 34°10′52″N 82°22′43″W	Abbeville	Second and third sets of boundaries represent a boundary decrease of September 14, 1972 and a boundary increase of May 7, 1984 respectively
4	Abbeville Opera House	Abbeville Opera House	July 1, 1970 (#70000558)	Court Square; 34°10′40″N 82°22′42″W	Abbeville	
5	Armistead Burt House	Armistead Burt House	April 3, 1970 (#70000559)	306 N. Main St. 34°10′52″N 82°22′59″W	Abbeville	
6	Patrick Calhoun Family Cemetery	Patrick Calhoun Family Cemetery	August 28, 1975 (#75001684)	9.5 miles southwest of Abbeville on SC 823; 34°03′43″N 82°26′45″W	Abbeville vicinity	
7	Cedar Springs Historic District	Cedar Springs Historic District	March 25, 1982 (#82003824)	South Carolina Highways 33 and 47; 34°04′50″N 82°18′08″W	Abbeville vicinity	
8	Donalds Grange No. 497	Donalds Grange No. 497	January 9, 1995 (#94001564)	South Carolina Highway 184; 34°22′06″N 82°21′07″W	Donalds	
9	Erskine College-Due West Historic District	Erskine College-Due West Historic District	March 19, 1982 (#82003825)	Main, Church, College, Bonner, Hayne, Washington, Cleveland, Depot, and Abbeville Sts. 34°19′45″N 82°23′26″W	Due West	
10	Harbison College President's Home	Harbison College President's Home	January 13, 1983 (#83002181)	North of Abbeville on South Carolina Highway 20; 34°11′45″N 82°23′05″W	Abbeville vicinity	
11	Lindsay Cemetery	Lindsay Cemetery	May 27, 2009 (#09000364)	Lindsay Cemetery Rd. 34°18′01″N 82°24′58″W	Due West vicinity	
12	Trinity Episcopal Church and Cemetery	Trinity Episcopal Church and Cemetery	May 6, 1971 (#71000738)	Church St. 34°10′35″N 82°22′49″W	Abbeville	
13	Upper Long Cane Cemetery	Upper Long Cane Cemetery	December 17, 2010 (#10001039)	Greenville St. (South Carolina Highway 20 North) at junction with Beltline Rd. (SC Sec Rd 1-35); 34°12′13″N 82°23′24″W	Abbeville vicinity	
14	J.S. Wright High School		June 8, 2026 (#100013097)	700 Branch Street; 34°11′02″N 82°22′01″W	Abbeville	
15	Young Place	Young Place	October 9, 1974 (#74001818)	South Carolina Highway 185; 34°19′59″N 82°23′56″W	Due West	

== See also ==
- List of National Historic Landmarks in South Carolina
- National Register of Historic Places listings in South Carolina
