= Warrenton Presbyterian Church =

Warrenton Presbyterian Church can refer to:

- Warrenton Presbyterian Church (Warrenton, Virginia)
- Warrenton Presbyterian Church (Abbeville, South Carolina)
