= List of county courthouses in South Carolina =

This is a list of county courthouses in South Carolina. Each county in South Carolina has a courthouse in the county seat.

Courthouse	Photo	County	Location	Built	Notes
Abbeville County Courthouse		Abbeville	Abbeville; 34°10′40″N 82°22′42″W	1908	Listed on the National Register of Historic Places
Aiken County Courthouse		Aiken	Aiken; 33°33′30″N 81°43′13″W		
Allendale County Courthouse		Allendale	Allendale; 33°0′47″N 81°18′21″W	1922	Listed on the National Register of Historic Places
Anderson County Courthouse		Anderson	Anderson; 34°30′12″N 82°39′0″W	1898	Part of the Anderson Downtown Historic District (NRHP)
Bamberg County Courthouse		Bamberg	Bamberg; 33°17′53″N 81°2′2″W		
Barnwell County Courthouse		Barnwell	Barnwell; 33°14′39″N 81°21′55″W		
Beaufort County Courthouse		Beaufort	Beaufort; 32°26′17″N 80°41′13″W	1936	Part of the Beaufort Historic District (NRHP)
Berkeley County Courthouse		Berkeley	Moncks Corner; 33°12′2″N 80°1′5″W		
Calhoun County Courthouse		Calhoun	St. Matthews; 33°39′49″N 80°46′44″W	1913	Listed on the National Register of Historic Places
Charleston County Courthouse		Charleston	Charleston; 32°46′36″N 79°55′53″W	1753	Part of the Charleston Old and Historic District (NRHP)
Cherokee County Courthouse		Cherokee	Gaffney; 35°4′23″N 81°38′52″W		
Chester County Courthouse		Chester	Chester; 34°42′22″N 81°12′48″W	c.1852	Part of the Chester Historic District (NRHP)
Chesterfield County Courthouse		Chesterfield	Chesterfield; 34°44′10″N 80°5′7″W	1884	Part of the East Main Street Historic District (NRHP)
Clarendon County Courthouse		Clarendon	Manning; 33°41′40″N 80°12′41″W		
Colleton County Courthouse		Colleton	Walterboro; 32°54′9″N 80°40′0″W	1820	Listed on the National Register of Historic Places
Darlington County Courthouse		Darlington	Darlington; 34°18′12″N 79°52′16″W		
Dillon County Courthouse		Dillon	Dillon; 34°25′6″N 79°22′32″W	1911	Listed on the National Register of Historic Places
Dorchester County Courthouse		Dorchester	St. George; 33°11′6″N 80°34′39″W		
Edgefield County Courthouse		Edgefield	Edgefield; 33°47′23″N 81°55′49″W	1839	Part of the Edgefield Historic District (NRHP)
Fairfield County Courthouse		Fairfield	Winnsboro; 34°22′49″N 81°5′13″W	1823	Part of the Winnsboro Historic District (NRHP)
Florence County Courthouse		Florence	Florence; 34°11′55″N 79°46′4″W		
Georgetown County Courthouse		Georgetown	Georgetown; 33°22′0″N 79°16′54″W	1824	Part of the Georgetown Historic District (NRHP)
Greenville County Courthouse		Greenville	Greenville; 34°50′55″N 82°24′1″W	1916	Listed on the National Register of Historic Places
Greenwood County Courthouse		Greenwood	Greenwood; 34°11′17″N 82°9′45″W		
Hampton County Courthouse		Hampton	Hampton; 32°51′58″N 81°6′33″W	1878	Listed on the National Register of Historic Places
Horry County Courthouse		Horry	Conway; 33°50′6″N 79°2′46″W	1825	Part of the Conway Downtown Historic District (NRHP)
Jasper County Courthouse		Jasper	Ridgeland; 32°29′3″N 80°59′7″W	1915	Listed on the National Register of Historic Places
Kershaw County Courthouse		Kershaw	Camden; 34°14′52″N 80°36′28″W		
Lancaster County Courthouse		Lancaster	Lancaster; 34°43′12″N 80°46′16″W	1828	Listed on the National Register of Historic Places
Laurens County Courthouse		Laurens	Laurens; 34°29′58″N 82°0′52″W	1838	Listed on the National Register of Historic Places
Lee County Courthouse		Lee	Bishopville; 34°13′1″N 80°14′58″W	1908	Listed on the National Register of Historic Places
Lexington County Courthouse		Lexington	Lexington; 33°58′49″N 81°14′7″W		Listed on the National Register of Historic Places
Marion County Courthouse		Marion	Marion; 34°10′43″N 79°24′2″W	1853	Part of the Marion Historic District (NRHP)
Marlboro County Courthouse		Marlboro	Bennettsville; 34°37′1″N 79°41′5″W	1885	Part of the Bennettsville Historic District (NRHP)
McCormick County Courthouse		McCormick	McCormick; 33°54′38″N 82°17′41″W	1923	Listed on the National Register of Historic Places
Newberry County Courthouse		Newberry	Newberry; 34°16′32″N 81°37′8″W	1908	Part of the Newberry Historic District (NRHP)
Oconee County Courthouse		Oconee	Walhalla; 34°45′54″N 83°4′5″W	2003	
Orangeburg County Courthouse		Orangeburg	Orangeburg; 33°29′31″N 80°51′46″W		
Pickens County Courthouse	Pickens County Courthouse	Pickens	Pickens; 34°53′0″N 82°42′25″W		
Richland County Courthouse		Richland	Columbia; 34°0′29″N 81°2′15″W		
Saluda County Courthouse		Saluda	Saluda; 34°0′4″N 81°46′17″W		
Spartanburg County Courthouse		Spartanburg	Spartanburg; 34°57′6″N 81°56′8″W	1958	
Sumter County Courthouse		Sumter	Sumter; 33°55′21″N 80°20′26″W	1907	Listed on the National Register of Historic Places
Union County Courthouse		Union	Union; 34°42′55″N 81°37′32″W	1913	Part of the Union Downtown Historic District (NRHP)
Williamsburg County Courthouse		Williamsburg	Kingstree; 33°39′48″N 79°49′51″W	1823	Part of the Kingstree Historic District (NRHP)
York County Courthouse		York	York; 34°59′39″N 81°14′33″W	1914	Listed on the National Register of Historic Places

== See also ==
- List of United States federal courthouses in South Carolina
