= Abbeville Historic District (Abbeville, South Carolina) =

Historic district in South Carolina, United States

- Abbeville Historic District (South Carolina)
- U.S. National Register of Historic Places
- U.S. Historic district
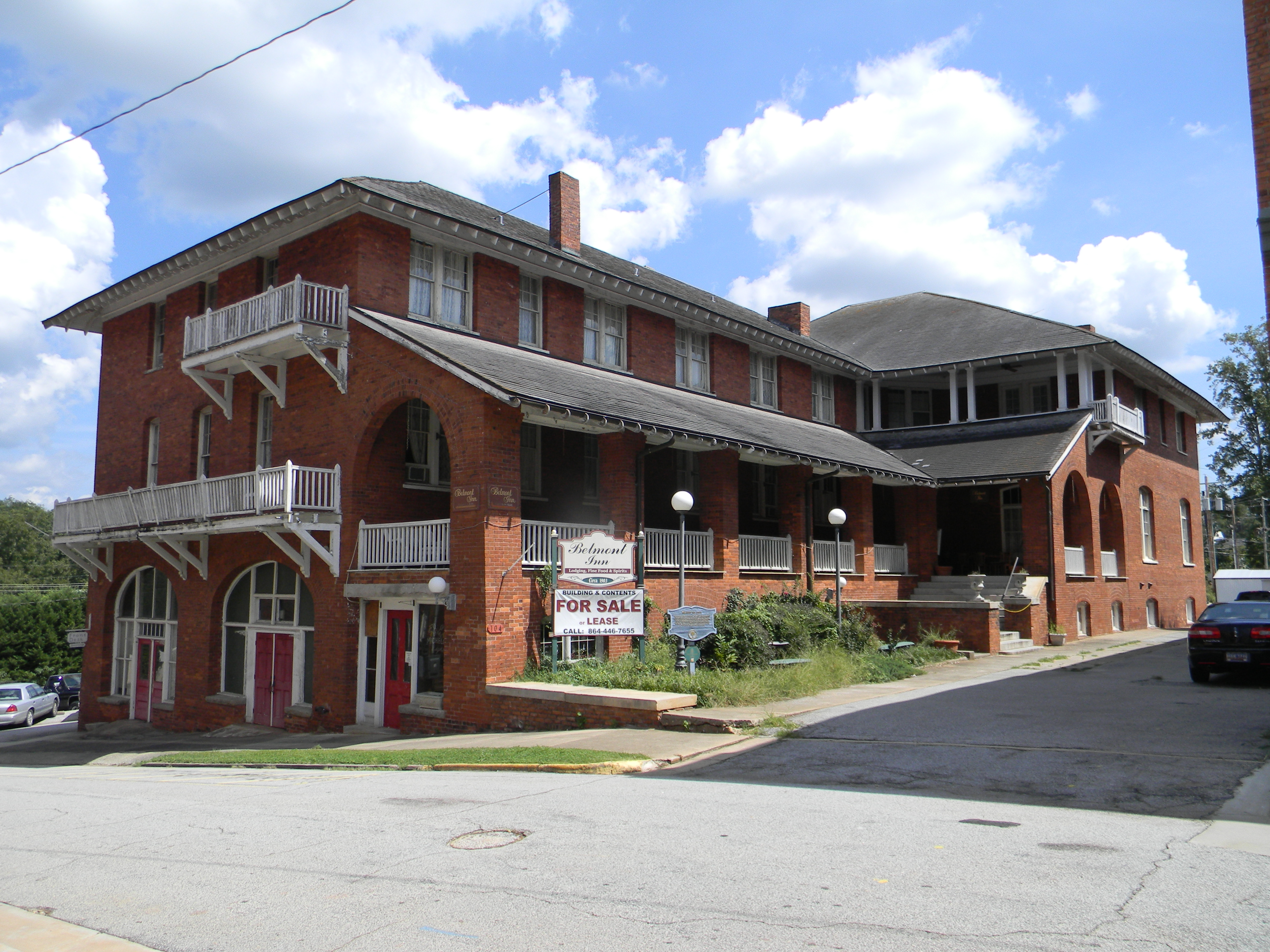
- Belmont Inn, originally the Eureka Hotel (c. 1890), on the old town square

- Location within South Carolina Location within the United States
- Location: Roughly bounded by Seaboard Coastline RR, SR 72, Rickey, Haight, Hemphill and Haigler Sts., Abbeville, South Carolina
- Coordinates: 34°10′52″N 82°22′43″W
- Built: 1786
- Architect: Multiple
- Architectural style: Includes Second Empire, Gothic Revival, Beaux-Arts, Queen Anne, Bungalow, Greek Revival, Victorian
- NRHP reference No.: 72001183 (original); May 7, 1984 (increase); 72001579 (decrease)

Significant dates
- Added to NRHP: September 14, 1972
- Boundary increase: May 7, 1984
- Boundary decrease: September 14, 1972

Abbeville Historic District is a historic district in Abbeville, South Carolina. It includes several properties listed separately in the National Register of Historic Places, including the Abbeville County Courthouse and the Abbeville Opera House. The district was listed in National Register on September 14, 1972.

Originally, the district was roughly bounded by Seaboard Coastline RR, SR 72, Rickey, Haight, Hemphill and Haigler Sts. A 1972 decrease of area, roughly E of Magazine St., S of Whitehall St., NW along Long Branch St., W of Lemon St., N along Washington St., decreased the size of the district. According to the National Register Information System (NRIS), this decrease was approved simultaneously as the original district designation. A 1984 increase, of area roughly W along N. Main St. from Haigler to Livingston Sts., N along Greenville St., and NE on Marshall Ct., added to the district.

== History ==
The district includes a large portion of Abbeville, the county seat of Abbeville County. The city, formed in the late 18th century, played a role in the political history of the area, including one of the first public meetings regarding succession from the Union, a precursor to the Civil War. Most of the commercial buildings in the district are representative of the late 19th and early 20th centuries, primarily due to three large fires in 1872 - 1873. The subsequent redevelopment gave the town square its present appearance.

The original nomination form included sixteen sites that contributed to the historical significance of the district. These buildings included a mix of residential (ten) and commercial (five) structures, and greenspace (one):

- Abbeville Press and Banner Building
- Ace Hardware Building (1831)
- Old Bank Building
- Abbeville Opera House
- Abbeville County Courthouse (1903)
- The Burt House (c. 1830)
- Secession Hill
- Trinity Episcopal Church (1860)
- Quay-Adams House
- Wardlaw-Klugh House (1831)
- Lee-Reid House (1885)
- McGowan-Barksdale House (1888)
- Gary-Harris-Wren House (1885)
- Harris House (1886)
- Gary-DuPree House (c. 1885)
- Shillito-Townsend House (c. 1830)

The boundary increase that occurred on May 7, 1984, added numerous properties to the district. The district now contains 37 properties of significance, 282 supporting properties, and 209 non-contributing properties for a total of 528 sites. Most of the structures are still standing, although the addresses used in the nomination form may have changed.

== See also ==
- List of Registered Historic Places in South Carolina
- National Register of Historic Places listings in Abbeville County, South Carolina
