= Jonathan Alexander Baxter =

South Carolina state legislator (1854 - 1927)

Jonathan Alexander Baxter (1854 - 1927) was a teacher, shoemaker and state legislator in South Carolina. His house at 932 Duke Street is in Georgetown, South Carolina and is part of the Georgetown Historic District. It was built circa 1890.

Baxter was born in Charleston, South Carolina. He grew up in Georgetown, South Carolina, after his family moved there when he was young. He attended public schools in Georgetown and worked as a shoemaker for several years after being taught the skill by his father. Afterwards, he worked as a teacher.

Baxter later became an alderman and in 1878, he was the commissioner of elections in Georgetown.

He served three terms in the South Carolina House of Representatives from 1884 to 1889. He and other African American state legislators in South Carolina were honored in a resolution during the 2007-2008 session.

== See also ==
- African American officeholders from the end of the Civil War until before 1900
