= Columbia, South Carolina, in the American Civil War =

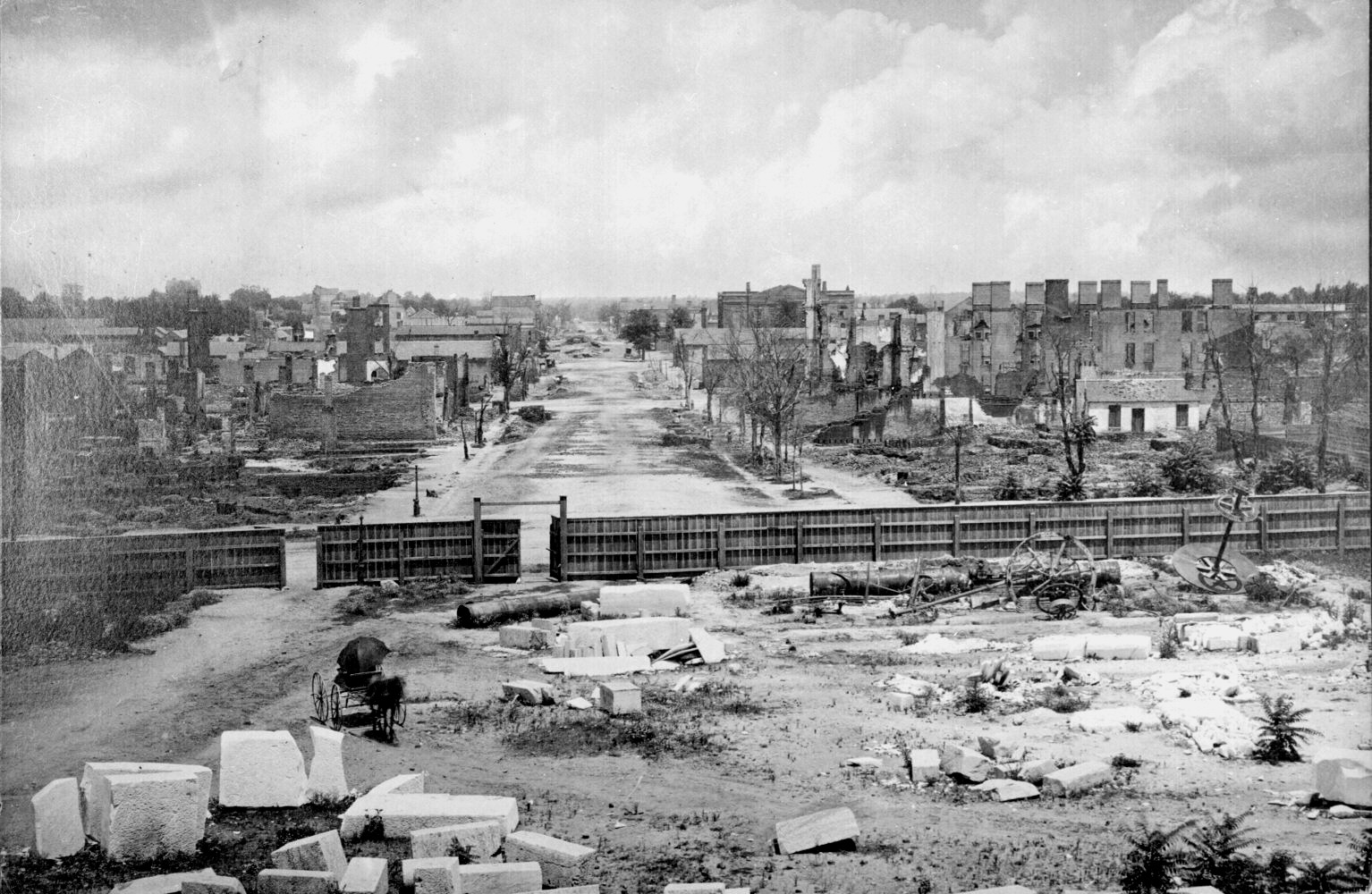
Ruins, as seen from the State House, 1865

Columbia, the capital city of South Carolina, was an important political and supply center for the Confederate States Army during the American Civil War. Much of the town was destroyed during occupation by Union forces under Major General William T. Sherman during the Carolinas campaign in the last months of the war. Sherman was accused of having deliberately and needlessly burned the city, which he denied. Modern historians say that multiple causes were responsible.

== Early Civil War history ==
Columbia became chartered as a city in 1786 and soon grew at a rapid pace, and throughout the 1850s and 1860s it was the largest inland city in the Carolinas. Railroad transportation served as a significant cause of population expansion in Columbia during this time. Rail lines that reached the city in the 1840s were first and foremost interested in transporting cotton bales, not passengers. Cotton was the lifeblood of the Columbia community, as before the Civil War, directly or indirectly, virtually all of the city's commercial and economic activity was related to cotton.

Columbia's First Baptist Church hosted the South Carolina Secession Convention on December 17, 1860, with delegates selected a month earlier at Secession Hill. The delegates drafted a resolution in favor of secession without dissent, 159–0, creating the short-lived Republic of South Carolina. Columbia's location made it an ideal spot for other conventions and meetings within the Confederacy. During the ensuing Civil War, bankers, railroad executives, teachers, and theologians from several states met in the city from time to time to discuss certain matters.

Camp Sorghum was a Confederate prisoner-of-war camp established in 1864 west of Columbia. It consisted of a 5-acre (20,000 m^{2}) tract of open field, without walls, fences, buildings or any other facilities. A "deadline" was established by laying wood planks 10 feet (3.0 m) inside the camp's boundaries. The rations consisted of cornmeal and sorghum molasses as the main staple in the diet; thus the camp became known as "Camp Sorghum". Due to the lack of security features, escapes were common. Conditions were terrible, with little food, clothing, or medicine, and disease claimed a number of lives among both the prisoners and their guards.

== Union capture ==
Following the Battle of Rivers' Bridge on February 3, 1865, the Confederate division of Maj. Gen. Lafayette McLaws attempted to prevent the crossing of the Salkehatchie River by the right wing of Maj. Gen. William T. Sherman's Union army. The Union division under Maj. Gen. Francis P. Blair (Howard's army) crossed the river and assaulted McLaws's flank. McLaws withdrew to Branchville, causing only one day's delay in the Union advance.

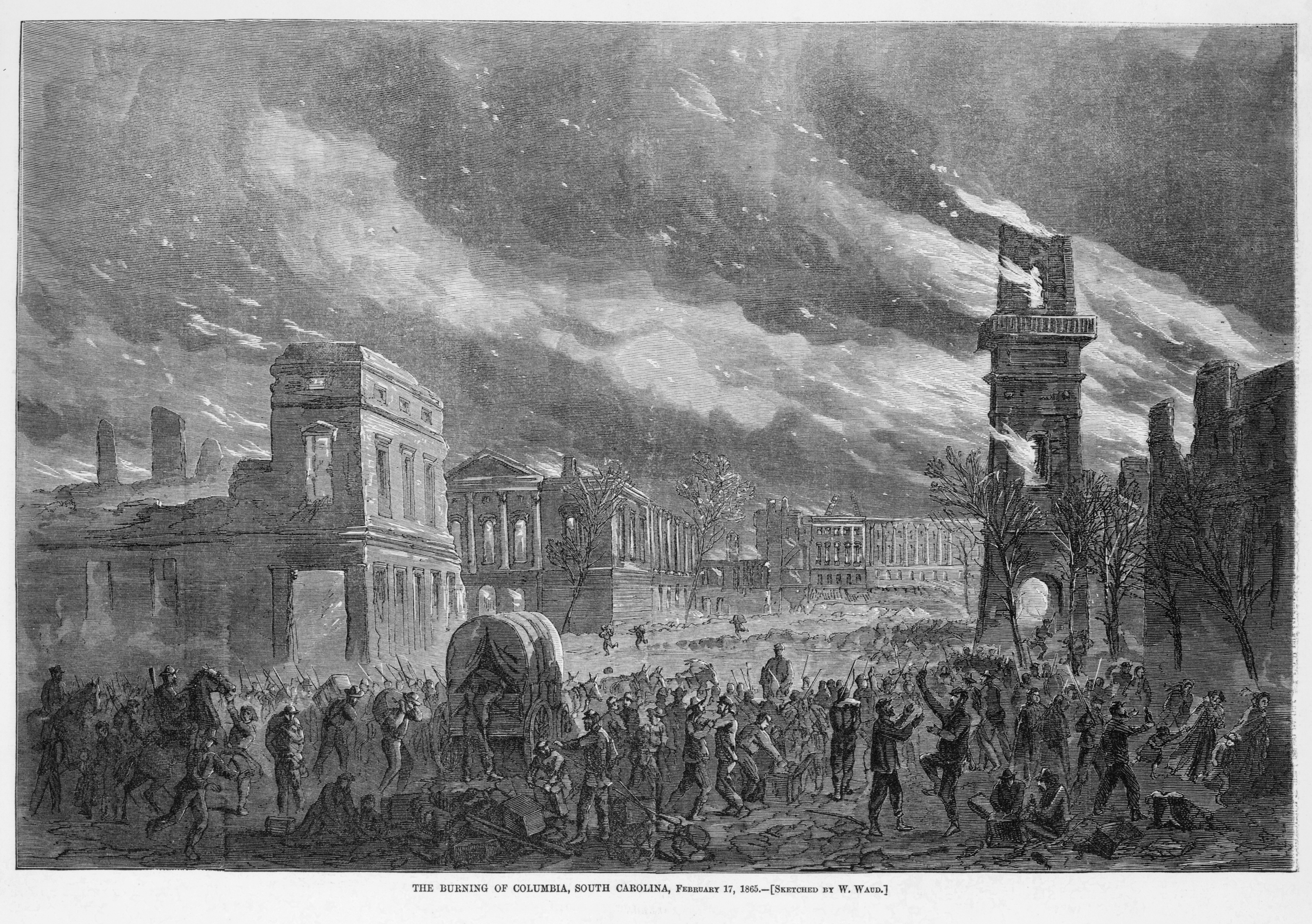
The Burning of Columbia, South Carolina (1865) by William Waud for Harper's Weekly

On February 17, 1865, Columbia surrendered to Sherman, and Wade Hampton's Confederate cavalry retreated from the city. Union forces were overwhelmed by throngs of liberated Federal prisoners and emancipated slaves. Many soldiers took advantage of ample supplies of liquor in the city and began to drink. Fires began in the city, and high winds spread the flames across a wide area. Most of the central city was destroyed, and municipal fire companies found it difficult to operate in conjunction with the invading army, many of whom were also fighting the fire. The burning of Columbia has engendered controversy ever since, with some claiming the fires were accidental, a deliberate act of vengeance, or perhaps set by retreating Confederate soldiers who lit cotton bales while leaving town. On that same day, the Confederates evacuated Charleston. On February 18, Sherman's forces destroyed virtually anything of military value in Columbia, including railroad depots, warehouses, arsenals, and machine shops.

Among the buildings burned were the old South Carolina State House and the interior of the incomplete new State House. The Arsenal Academy was also burned; the only surviving building is today the South Carolina Governor's Mansion.

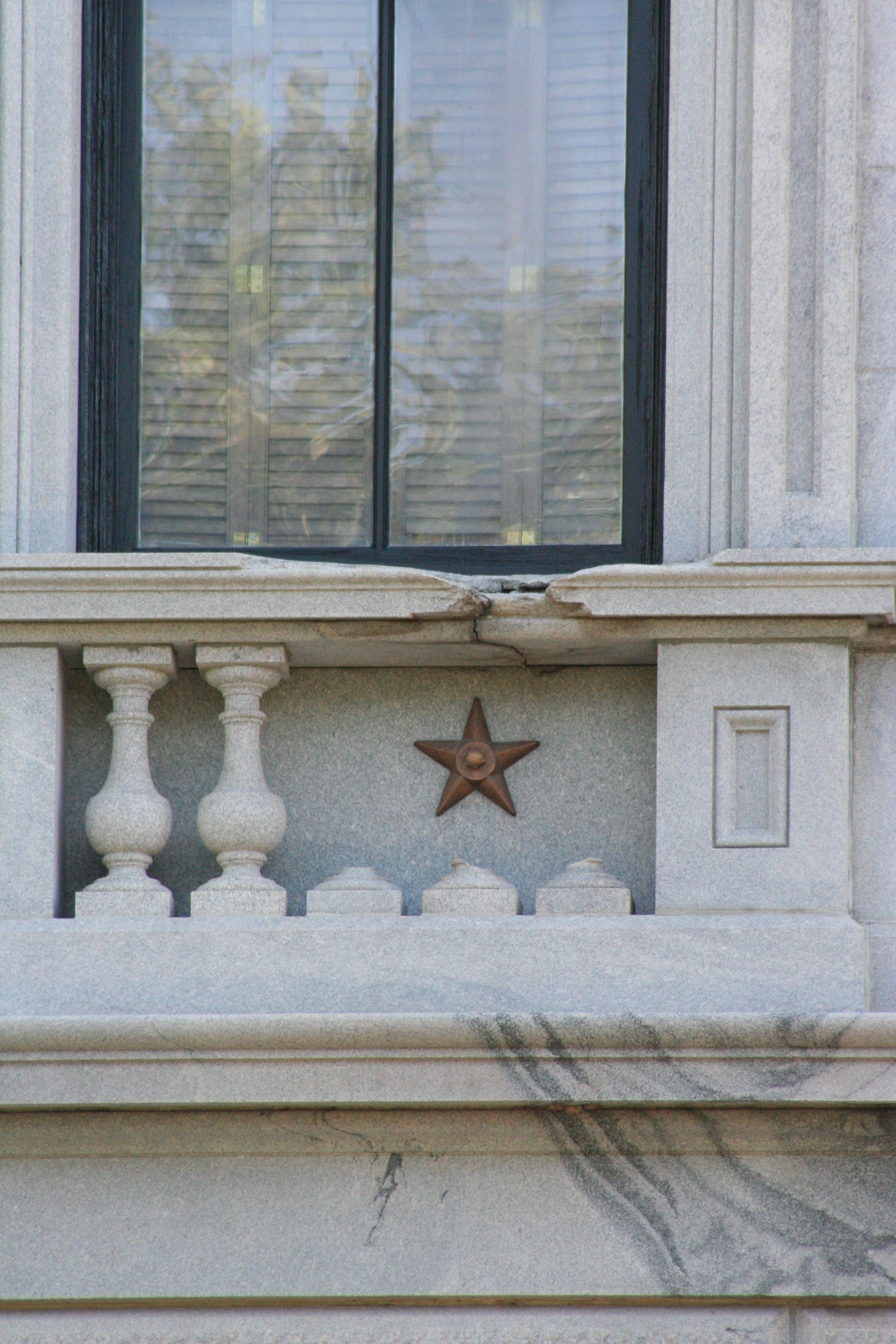
Bronze star on the State House, indicating an artillery strike

Controversy surrounding the burning of the city began before the war had ended. Shortly afterwards, Southern publications alleged that the burning had been a deliberate Northern atrocity. General Sherman blamed the high winds and retreating Confederate soldiers for firing bales of cotton, which had been stacked in the streets. Sherman denied ordering the burning, though he did order militarily significant structures, such as the Confederate Printing Plant, destroyed.

According to Marion Lucas, author of Sherman and the Burning of Columbia, "the destruction of Columbia was not the result of a single act or events of a single day. Neither was it the work of an individual or a group. Instead it was the culmination of eight days of riots, robbery, pillage, confusion and fires, all of which were the byproducts of war. The event was surrounded by coincidence, misjudgment, and accident. It is impossible, he maintains, to determine with certainty the origin of the fire. The most probable explanation was that it began from the burning cotton on Richardson street. Columbia at this time was a virtual firetrap because of the hundreds of cotton bales in her streets. Some of these had been ignited before Sherman arrived and a high wind spread the flammable substance over the city."

In 2015, The State identified "5 myths about the Burning of Columbia":

1. Sherman ordered the burning of Columbia.
2. All of Columbia burned.
3. There was a "battle" for Columbia.
4. Union soldiers burned the Congaree River bridge.
5. First Baptist Church was saved by an African-American caretaker.

== Reconstruction ==
During Reconstruction, Columbia became the focus of considerable attention. Reporters, journalists, travelers, and tourists flocked to South Carolina's capital city to witness a Southern state legislature whose members included ex-slaves. The city also made somewhat of a rebound following the devastating fire of 1865; a mild construction boom took place within the first few years of Reconstruction, and repair of railroad tracks in outlying areas created jobs for area citizens.

== Notable Civil War personalities from Columbia ==
- Maxcy Gregg — Confederate brigadier general mortally wounded at the Battle of Fredericksburg
- Alexander Cheves Haskell — Colonel of the 1st South Carolina Cavalry, led a Confederate brigade late in the war

William Augustus Reckling (1850–1913) was a noted SC Photographer operating in Columbia 1870–1910 at times with his 2 sons as "Reckling & Sons Photographers" on Senate St now part of the USC campus. The latter has a collection of Reckling's photos of notable South Carolinians of the era as well as a series of stereographs of Columbia.

== Civil War tourism ==
The Confederate Relic Room and Military Museum, part of the S.C. Budget and Control Board, showcases an artifact collection from the Colonial period to the space age. The museum houses a collection of South Carolina artifacts from the Confederate period.

The six impacts from Sherman's cannonballs to the granite exterior of the State House were never repaired, and are today marked by bronze stars.

Today, tourists can follow the path General Sherman's army took to enter the city and see structures or remnants of structures that survived the fire. A Civil War walking tour is available.
