= Mary Elizabeth Moragne Davis =

American writer

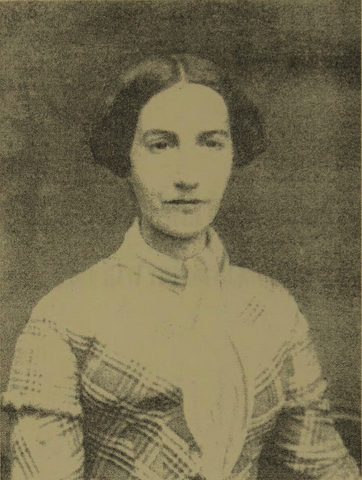
- Born: Mary Elizabeth Moragne; 1815; Oakwood, Abbeville District, South Carolina, U.S.
- Died: 1903 (aged 87–88); Talladega, Alabama, U.S.
- Resting place: Oak Hill Cemetery, Talladega, Alabama
- Occupations: diarist; author
- Spouse: William Hervey Davis (m. 1842)
- Writing career
- Pen name: "A Lady of South Carolina"
- Language: English
- Genres: romantic fiction; poetry
- Subject: religious topics

Mary Elizabeth Moragne Davis (née, Moragne; pen names, A Lady of South Carolina, M. E. Moragne; 1815–1903) was an American diarist, and an author of romantic fiction, poetry, and religious topics. In 1838, she was awarded First Prize for "The British Partizan", a short historical romance published in the Augusta Mirror.

== Early life and education ==
Mary Elizabeth Moragne was born in 1815, at Oakwood, in Abbeville District, South Carolina. Her father, Isaac, Moragne, was a planter. Her mother was Margaret Blanton Caine Moragne. There were ten younger siblings, including brothers, John Moragne and William C. Moragne.

Moragne was descended, on the paternal side, from the French Huguenots who sought religious freedom in the United States in 1764. That portion of the colony which did not remain in Charleston, South Carolina found refuge on the banks of Little River, in that district, where they formed a township after the manner of the country which they had left. Her connection with, and proximity to this settlement, gave inspiration to Moragne, and in the introduction to an unfinished story once contemplated on this subject, she gave a brief history of this settlement. Among these settlers was Pierre Moragne, her grandfather, who, having lost his wife on the passage round by Plymouth, returned to Charleston from New Bordeaux, and married Cecille Bayle, a beautiful “compagnon-du-voyage.” As his letters and journals testify, he was from his youth addicted to literary pursuits, and though the wants of a primitive settlement could not have been very favourable to such inclinations, he is remembered and spoken of as a character of great eccentricity, on account of having devoted the latter years of his life to writing. His writings were not appreciated by his immediate descendants; and of the many manuscripts which he left, prepared for publication, only a few remain. The youngest of his four sons, who inherited much of his philosophic and eccentric temperament, was the father of Miss Moragne. On the other side, her maternal grandmother claimed descent from the Randolphs of Roanoke.

Moragné grew up on her father's small plantation, Oakwood, near the French Huguenot settlement, New Bordeaux. She attended neighborhood schools and local female seminaries, but she was mostly self-educated, having acquired a knowledge of some of the sciences and of the French language mainly by her own efforts. An avid reader and writer from an early age, she began keeping a journal in 1834.

== Career ==
"The British Partisan", her first publication, appeared, as a prize story, in the Augusta Mirror, in 1838. It was well received, adding greatly to the extension of the periodical, besides being reprinted in book form.

In 1839, soon after the publication of her first effort in novel-writing, she attached herself to the Presbyterian church at Willington, South Carolina in which she had been brought up, under the care of the Rev. Dr. Waddel. She experienced at the same time a change of views in regard to the propriety of that branch of literature which she had adopted -romantic fiction- and finally, after a few more efforts, some of which were never published, she resolved to end writing in this form, though it had been her favorite pursuit.

In 1841, appeared the "Rencontre", a short story, embracing revolutionary incidents. Of this story, Mr. Thompson, the editor of the Augusta Mirror, remarked as follows:—“The ‘Rencontre’ is of that class of literary productions which we prize above all other orders of fiction. Illustrative as it is of our own history, descriptive of our own peculiar scenery, and abounding in sound reflections and truly elevated sentiment, we hold it worth volumes of the mawkish romance and sickly sentimentality which has of late become a merchantable commodity with a great portion of the literary world.” About this time appeared also some smaller pieces, both in prose and verse. One of the latter was called "Joseph, a Scripture sketch, in three parts", comprising more than a thousand lines of blank verse. Near the close of the year 1841, the editor of the Augusta Mirror stated:—“We have received the first part of a tale, entitled "The Walsingham Family, or, A Mother’s Ambition", by a favourite lady correspondent. We are much pleased with it, and judging from past efforts of the same pen, do not hesitate to promise our readers a rich treat.” This was a domestic tale of some length, apparently designed to illustrate the folly and vanity of a worldly and ambitious mother; but although the first six chapters were in the hands of the publisher, and the remainder nearly ready for publication, she withdrew it, notwithstanding the earnest solicitation of the editors into whose possession it had passed.

== Personal life ==
In 1842, she married Dr. Waddel's successor, the Rev. William Hervey Davis, and removed with him the following year to Mount Carmel, South Carolina, in the vicinity of the same church.

She died in Talladega, Alabama, 1903, and was buried in that city's Oak Hill Cemetery.

== Selected works ==
- Mrs. Rebecca Motte, 1877

=== By M. E. Moragne ===
- The British partizan : a tale of the times of old : originally published as a prize tale, in the Augusta Mirror, 1839

=== Mary E. Moragne ===
- The neglected thread a journal from the Calhoun community, 1836-1842, 1951 (published posthumously)

=== By A Lady of South Carolina ===
- The British partizan : a Revolutionary War tale, 1864

=== By Mary E. Moragne Davis ===
- Lays from the sunny lands, 1888

== Awards ==
- First Prize, "The British Partizan", a short historical romance, 1838, Augusta Mirror
