= Abbeville, South Carolina =

- City
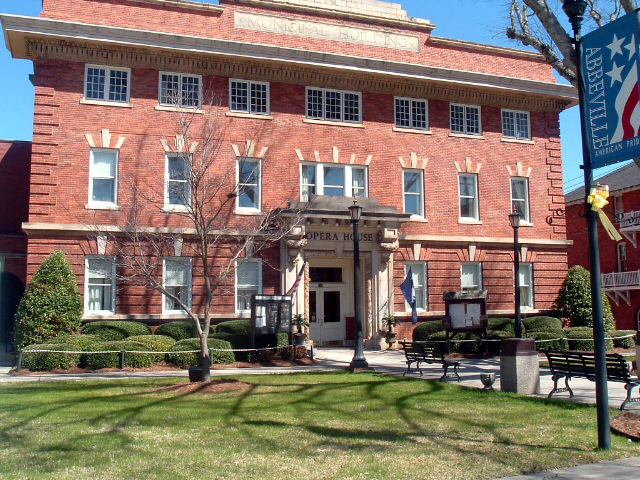
- Abbeville Opera House (2003)

- Logo

- Location within the state of South Carolina Abbeville (the United States) Abbeville (North America)
- Coordinates: 34°10′42″N 82°22′14″W
- Country: United States
- State: South Carolina
- County: Abbeville

Area
  - Total: 6.23 sq mi (16.13 km^{2})
  - Land: 6.22 sq mi (16.10 km^{2})
  - Water: 0.012 sq mi (0.03 km^{2})
- Elevation: 554 ft (169 m)

Population (2020)
  - Total: 4,874
  - Density: 784.2/sq mi (302.77/km^{2})
- Time zone: UTC−5 (Eastern (EST))
  - Summer (DST): UTC−4 (EDT)
- ZIP code: 29620
- Area codes: 864, 821
- FIPS code: 45-00100
- GNIS feature ID: 2403055
- Website: www.abbevillecitysc.com

Abbeville is a city and county seat of Abbeville County, in the U.S. state of South Carolina. It is located 86 miles (138 km) west of Columbia and 45 miles (72 km) south of Greenville. As of the 2020 census, Abbeville had a population of 4,874. Settled by French Huguenot settlers, it was named, along with the county, for the French town of the same name.

== History ==
Abbeville was established by French Huguenots in 1764, at a site named by John de la Howe. It was incorporated in 1840.

Famed states' rights advocate and Vice President John C. Calhoun first practiced law in Abbeville, and he was born on a farm on the outskirts in what is now Mt. Carmel.

=== Abbeville and the American Civil War ===
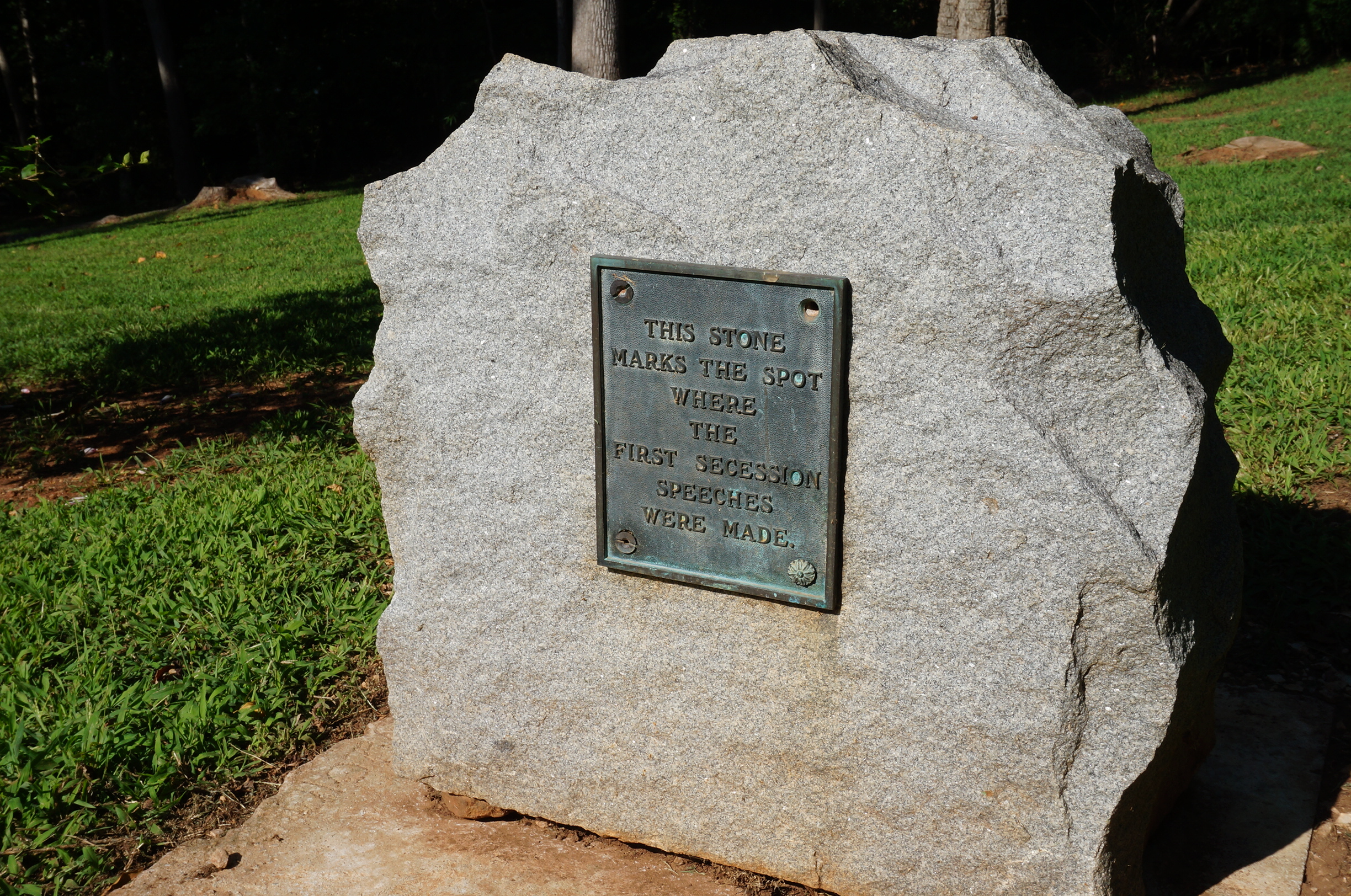
The rock at Secession Hill

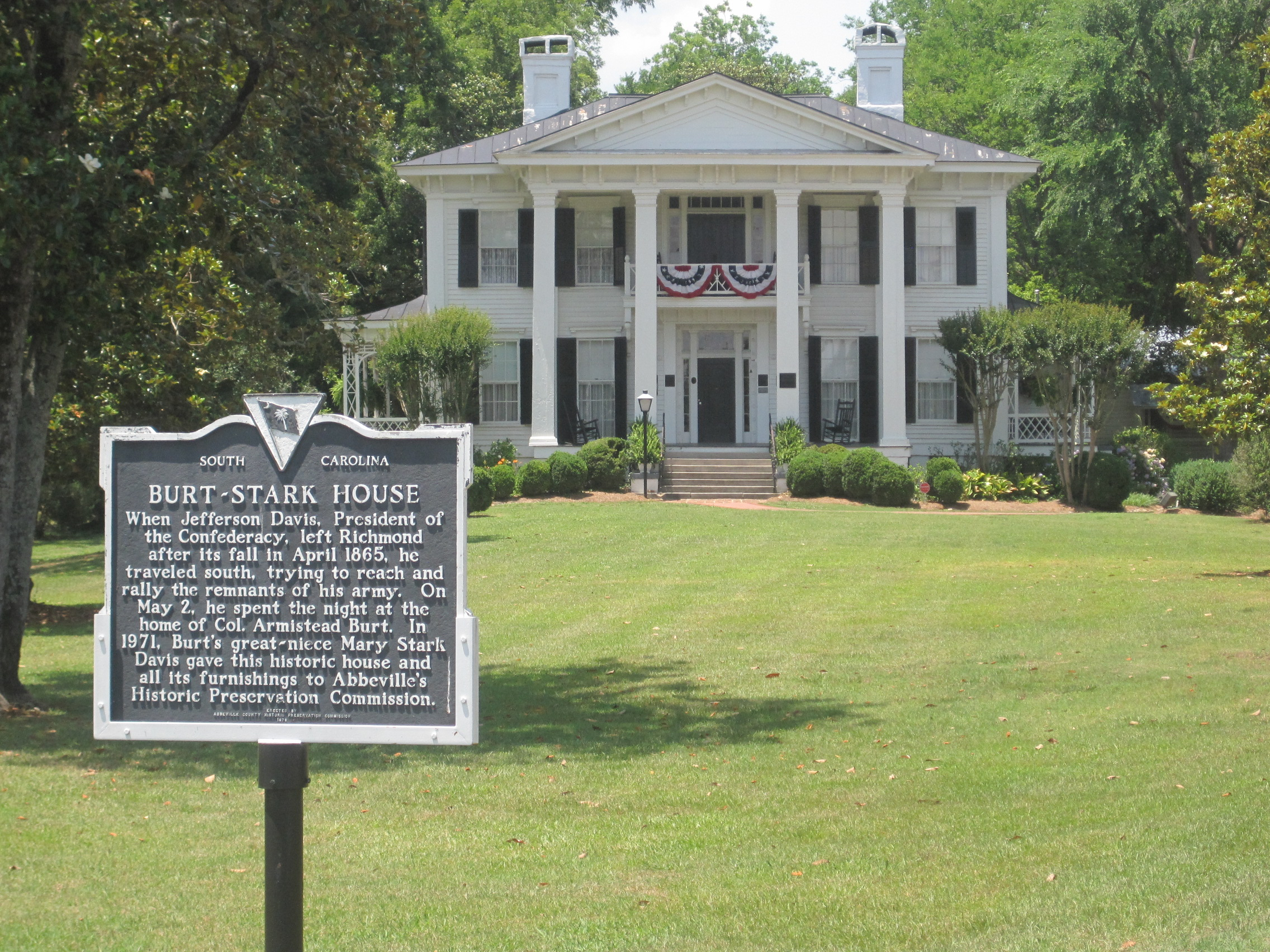
Historic Burt-Stark House

Abbeville has the unique distinction of being both the birthplace and the deathbed of the Confederacy. On November 22, 1860, a meeting was held at Abbeville, at a site since dubbed "Secession Hill", to launch South Carolina's secession from the Union; one month later, the state of South Carolina became the first state to secede.

At the end of the Civil War, with the Confederacy in shambles, Confederate President Jefferson Davis fled Richmond, Virginia, and headed south, stopping for a night in Abbeville at the home of his friend Armistead Burt. It was on May 2, 1865, in the front parlor of what is now known as the Burt-Stark Mansion that Jefferson Davis officially acknowledged the dissolution of the Confederate government, in the last official cabinet meeting.

=== 2003 right-of-way standoff ===
On December 8, 2003, in a 14-hour standoff that stemmed from a land-survey dispute, two Abbeville lawmen were killed by West Abbeville resident Steven Bixby. This siege has been compared by both sympathizers of the Bixbys and law enforcement agents to the events of Waco and Ruby Ridge. In February 2007, Steven Bixby was convicted on 17 counts including the two murders, as well as lesser charges of kidnapping and conspiracy. He was given two death sentences for the murders plus 125 years in prison on the other charges.

== Architectural mention ==
The Abbeville County Courthouse, Abbeville Historic District, Abbeville Opera House, Armistead Burt House, Patrick Calhoun Family Cemetery, Cedar Springs Historic District, and Trinity Episcopal Church and Cemetery are listed on the National Register of Historic Places.

Abbeville is also the location of the tallest building in South Carolina, the Prysmian Copper Wire Tower. Built in 2009, the tower is 373 feet (114 m) tall and has 30 floors.

== Geography ==
Abbeville is located within the Piedmont Upland geographical region.

According to the United States Census Bureau, the city has a total area of 6.1 square miles (15.9 km^{2}), of which 0.012 square miles (0.03 km^{2}), or 0.19%, is water.

Nearby is the Sumter National Forest.

=== Climate ===
Abbeville has a humid subtropical climate (Köppen Cfa). Winters are cool, sometimes cold, and short in duration. Summers are hot and humid. The transitional seasons of spring and fall can vary in temperature but tend to be warm. In the summer highs usually peak in the mid 90s, but temperatures over 100 °F (37.8 °C) occur on occasion, most recently in the summer of 2012 during a heat wave. That year, the all-time record high of 109 °F (42.8 °C) was recorded on July 1. In the winter highs are in the low- to mid-50s and lows are right around freezing, seldom dropping below 25 °F (−3.9 °C). Precipitation is well distributed throughout the year. Afternoon thunderstorms are a common occurrence in the summer months and can bring heavy winds and lightning. Snow is rare, falling every few years. On March 31, 1973, an F4 tornado struck Abbeville and killed 7 people, making it the deadliest single tornado in 1973. The area was struck by two tornadoes on April 10, 2009. No fatalities were recorded, but the majority of the city lost power and many buildings sustained significant damage.

Climate data for Abbeville, SC
Month	Jan	Feb	Mar	Apr	May	Jun	Jul	Aug	Sep	Oct	Nov	Dec	Year
Record high °F (°C)	82 (28)	80 (27)	89 (32)	92 (33)	97 (36)	105 (41)	109 (43)	107 (42)	104 (40)	100 (38)	89 (32)	78 (26)	109 (43)
Mean daily maximum °F (°C)	53 (12)	58 (14)	66 (19)	74 (23)	82 (28)	88 (31)	91 (33)	90 (32)	84 (29)	74 (23)	65 (18)	55 (13)	73 (23)
Mean daily minimum °F (°C)	31 (−1)	34 (1)	40 (4)	48 (9)	57 (14)	66 (19)	70 (21)	69 (21)	62 (17)	50 (10)	41 (5)	33 (1)	50 (10)
Record low °F (°C)	−2 (−19)	2 (−17)	3 (−16)	24 (−4)	32 (0)	41 (5)	53 (12)	50 (10)	35 (2)	25 (−4)	13 (−11)	1 (−17)	−2 (−19)
Average precipitation inches (mm)	4.16 (106)	4.60 (117)	4.68 (119)	2.85 (72)	3.40 (86)	3.45 (88)	4.01 (102)	3.68 (93)	3.11 (79)	3.45 (88)	3.62 (92)	3.76 (96)	44.77 (1,137)

== Demographics ==
Historical population
Census	Pop.	Note	%±
1850	1,252		—
1860	592		−52.7%
1880	1,543		—
1890	1,696		9.9%
1900	3,766		122.1%
1910	4,459		18.4%
1920	4,570		2.5%
1930	4,414		−3.4%
1940	4,930		11.7%
1950	5,395		9.4%
1960	5,436		0.8%
1970	5,515		1.5%
1980	5,833		5.8%
1990	5,778		−0.9%
2000	5,840		1.1%
2010	5,237		−10.3%
2020	4,874		−6.9%
2024 (est.)	4,870		−0.1%
U.S. Decennial Census

Abbeville first appeared in the 1850 U.S. Census, when the town recorded a population of 1,252.

=== 2020 census ===
As of the 2020 census, Abbeville had a population of 4,874. The median age was 41.1 years. 23.0% of residents were under the age of 18 and 23.0% of residents were 65 years of age or older. For every 100 females there were 78.4 males, and for every 100 females age 18 and over there were 74.5 males age 18 and over.

95.2% of residents lived in urban areas, while 4.8% lived in rural areas.

There were 2,107 households in Abbeville, of which 30.8% had children under the age of 18 living in them. Of all households, 30.8% were married-couple households, 21.0% were households with a male householder and no spouse or partner present, and 42.4% were households with a female householder and no spouse or partner present. About 35.4% of all households were made up of individuals and 15.7% had someone living alone who was 65 years of age or older.

There were 2,436 housing units, of which 13.5% were vacant. The homeowner vacancy rate was 2.3% and the rental vacancy rate was 6.5%.

Racial composition as of the 2020 census
Race	Number	Percent
White	2,389	49.0%
Black or African American	2,275	46.7%
American Indian and Alaska Native	5	0.1%
Asian	8	0.2%
Native Hawaiian and Other Pacific Islander	2	0.0%
Some other race	24	0.5%
Two or more races	171	3.5%
Hispanic or Latino (of any race)	52	1.1%

=== 2010 census ===
As of the 2010 census the population of Abbeville was 5,237. The racial composition of the city was 46.9% White, 50.5% Black or African American, 0.9% Hispanic or Latino (of any race), 0.4% Asian, 0.2% Native American, 0.4% of other races, and 1.5% of Two or more races.

=== 2000 census ===
As of the census of 2000, there were 5,840 people, 2,396 households, and 1,574 families residing in the city. The population density was 995.2 inhabitants per square mile (384.2/km^{2}). There were 2,654 housing units at an average density of 452.3 per square mile (174.6/km^{2}). The racial makeup of the city was 50.46% White, 48.48% African American, 0.12% Native American, 0.26% Asian, 0.02% Pacific Islander, 0.19% from other races, and 0.48% from two or more races. Hispanic or Latino of any race were 0.75% of the population.

There were 2,396 households, out of which 30.7% had children under the age of 18 living with them, 37.1% were married couples living together, 23.9% had a female householder with no husband present, and 34.3% were non-families. 30.6% of all households were made up of individuals, and 13.9% had someone living alone who was 65 years of age or older. The average household size was 2.39 and the average family size was 2.97.

In the city, the population was spread out, with 27.2% under the age of 18, 8.8% from 18 to 24, 25.9% from 25 to 44, 21.2% from 45 to 64, and 16.8% who were 65 years of age or older. The median age was 36 years. For every 100 females, there were 80.4 males. For every 100 females age 18 and over, there were 73.9 males.

The median income for a household in the city was $25,756, and the median income for a family was $30,040. Males had a median income of $28,339 versus $21,824 for females. The per capita income for the city was $13,274. About 16.3% of families and 19.8% of the population were below the poverty line, including 29.2% of those under age 18 and 20.9% of those age 65 or over.

Abbeville is the center of a small urban cluster with a total population of 6,038 (2000 census).

== Economy ==
Agriculture and forestry are important industries in the area. Crops that are grown in quantities are cotton, corn, wheat, and hay. Livestock, dairy cows, and poultry are also raised in the area. Finally, textiles are the chief manufactured product, in particular, clothing. After the North American Free Trade Agreement clothing is no longer made in Abbeville. Also represented are plastic and metal products.

== Education ==
Abbeville is in the Abbeville County School District. Abbeville has Long Cane Primary, Westwood Elementary, J.S. Wright Middle, Dixie High, and Abbeville High for schools.

Abbeville has a public library, a branch of the Abbeville County Library System.

It also has some colleges, such as Piedmont Tech, Lander, Erskine, and many more.

== Arts and culture ==
=== Abbeville Gypsy ===
Abbeville is the homeplace of a holiday pudding dessert called Gypsy. Gypsy consists of pound or sponge cake, boiled custard, sherry, whipping cream, and almonds. Variations of recipe substituting bourbon for sherry exist. It resembles English trifle and has been referred to as "tipsy pudding" and southern tiramisu. It is usually cooked for Thanksgiving and/or Christmas in many "old Abbeville" families. The dish is not known to exist outside of Abbeville other than in families who moved from Abbeville elsewhere. It is usually served in a special stemmed, medium-sized, decorative crystal compote.

The origins of Gypsy go back to late 19th century. There is a mention of Gispy cake in 1831 edition William Kitchiner's The Cook's Oracle, which may have been a prototype for the Abbeville Gypsy. A local legend tells a story of an unknown woman serving Gypsy to Confederate President Jefferson Davis at the end of the Civil War in 1865. Theresa C. Brown included a recipe for Gipsy cake in the Creams chapter of her Modern Domestic Cookery (1871).

== Notable people ==
- Christie Benet, (1879–1951), U.S. Senator for South Carolina
- John C. Calhoun, (1782–1850), 7th American Vice President, 16th U.S. Secretary of State; born near Abbeville and also practiced law in Abbeville
- James S. Cothran (1830–1897), born near Abbeville, practiced law in Abbeville, confederate officer, judge, and United States Congressman from South Carolina, buried at Upper Long Cane Cemetery
- Thomas D. Howie (April 12, 1908 – July 17, 1944), American army officer killed during the Normandy Campaign of World War II while trying to capture the French town of Saint-Lô; he is known as "The Major of St. Lo"
- Samuel McGowan (1819–1897), born in Laurens County, SC; Confederate General wounded four times; post-war leader against "carpetbagger" rule; South Carolina Supreme Court associate justice
- Mary Elizabeth Moragne Davis (1815–1903) diarist, writer
- Benjamin Glover Shields (1808–1850), born in Abbeville, United States Congressman from Alabama, chargé d'affaires in Venezuela
- James L. Petigru (1789-1863), lawyer, politician, and jurist who opposed nullification and secession

== See also ==
- List of cities in South Carolina
- Warrenton Presbyterian Church (Abbeville, South Carolina)
