= Due West, South Carolina =

Due West
- Town
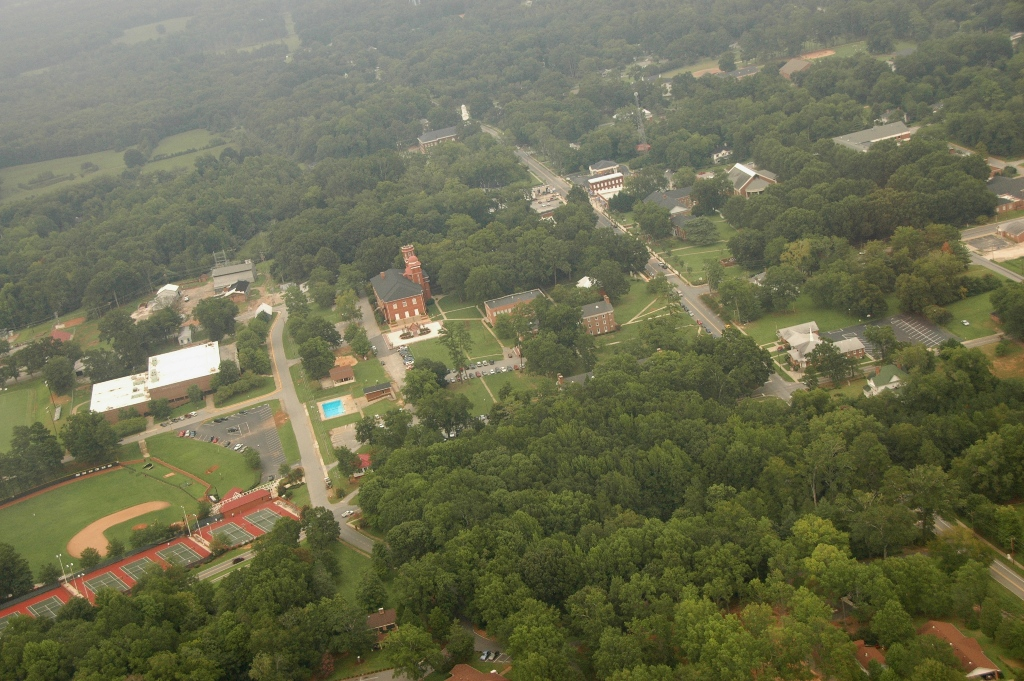
- Aerial view of Due West

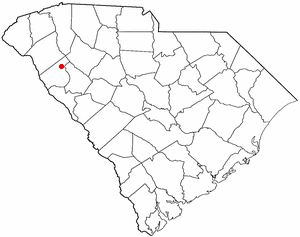
- Location of Due West, South Carolina
- Coordinates: 34°20′06″N 82°22′57″W
- Country: United States
- State: South Carolina
- County: Abbeville

Area
  - Total: 1.64 sq mi (4.25 km^{2})
  - Land: 1.64 sq mi (4.24 km^{2})
  - Water: 0.0039 sq mi (0.01 km^{2})
- Elevation: 702 ft (214 m)

Population (2020)
  - Total: 1,219
  - Density: 745/sq mi (287.8/km^{2})
- Time zone: UTC-5 (Eastern (EST))
  - Summer (DST): UTC-4 (EDT)
- ZIP code: 29639
- Area codes: 864, 821
- FIPS code: 45-21040
- GNIS feature ID: 2406402
- Website: www.duewestsc.gov

Due West is a town in Abbeville County, South Carolina. As of the 2020 census, Due West had a population of 1,219. It is home to Erskine College, Erskine Theological Seminary and Dixie High School.

== History ==
Some say the name is a mispronunciation of "DeWitt's Corner", while others believe the town was due west on a pioneer trail.

The Treaty of Dewitt's Corner, a historic peace negotiation in May 1777 with the Cherokee Indians, was signed in Due West. As a result of the treaty, the Cherokee peoples broke into two factions. One of them, the Chickamauga Cherokee, continued fighting area settlers for another 17 years.

The Erskine College-Due West Historic District, Lindsay Cemetery, and Young Place are listed on the National Register of Historic Places.

== Geography ==
According to the United States Census Bureau, the town has a total area of 1.6 square miles (4.2 km^{2}), of which 0.004 square miles (0.01 km^{2}), or 0.32%, is water.

== Demographics ==
Historical population
Census	Pop.	Note	%±
1850	330		—
1870	400		—
1880	449		12.3%
1890	644		43.4%
1900	631		−2.0%
1910	672		6.5%
1920	702		4.5%
1930	620		−11.7%
1940	593		−4.4%
1950	1,033		74.2%
1960	1,166		12.9%
1970	1,380		18.4%
1980	1,366		−1.0%
1990	1,220		−10.7%
2000	1,209		−0.9%
2010	1,247		3.1%
2020	1,219		−2.2%
2024 (est.)	1,292	▲	6.0%
U.S. Decennial Census

As of the census of 2000, there were 1,209 people, 307 households, and 194 families residing in the town. The population density was 738.4 inhabitants per square mile (285.1/km^{2}). There were 342 housing units at an average density of 208.9 per square mile (80.7/km^{2}). The racial makeup of the town was 79.24% White, 18.61% African American, 0.08% Native American, 0.99% Asian, 0.25% from other races, and 0.83% from two or more races. Hispanic or Latino of any race were 0.74% of the population.

There were 307 households, out of which 20.2% had children under the age of 18 living with them, 45.9% were married couples living together, 13.7% had a female householder with no husband present, and 36.8% were non-families. 32.2% of all households were made up of individuals, and 14.7% had someone living alone who was 65 years of age or older. The average household size was 2.21 and the average family size was 2.76.

In the town, the population was spread out, with 11.3% under the age of 18, 40.7% from 18 to 24, 14.5% from 25 to 44, 14.7% from 45 to 64, and 18.8% who were 65 years of age or older. The median age was 24 years. For every 100 females, there were 75.2 males. For every 100 females age 18 and over, there were 72.6 males.

The median income for a household in the town was $39,375, and the median income for a family was $53,000. Males had a median income of $35,917 versus $27,000 for females. The per capita income for the town was $22,758. About 9.5% of families and 13.5% of the population were below the poverty line, including 20.0% of those under age 18 and 14.0% of those age 65 or over.

== Education ==
It is in the Abbeville County School District. Elementary students in Due West attend Cherokee Trail Elementary in Donalds. The area has Dixie High School, serving grades 8–12.

Due West is the home of Erskine College, a private Christian liberal arts college affiliated with the Associate Reformed Presbyterian Church.

Due West is also home to Erskine Theological Seminary.

== Notable people ==
- Lawrence Cowan (1858–1933), Arizona territorial legislator, judge, lawyer, and businessman
- Charlayne Hunter-Gault (born 1942), civil rights activist and journalist
- Jim Lauderdale (born 1957), singer and songwriter
- Buck Pressly (1886–1954), professional baseball player and physician
