= Abbeville County Courthouse =

- Abbeville County Courthouse (South Carolina)
- U.S. National Register of Historic Places
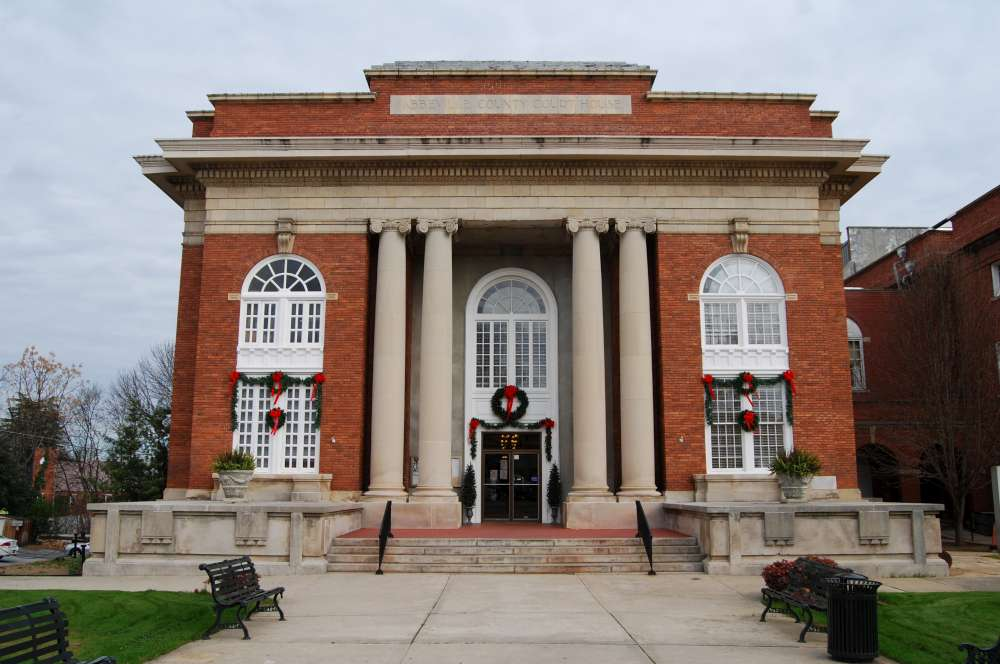
- Abbeville County Courthouse, 2008

- Location within South Carolina Location within the United States
- Location: Court Square, Abbeville, South Carolina
- Coordinates: 34.1778°N 82.3782°W
- Built: 1908
- Architect: William Augustus Edwards; builder: Frederic Minshall
- Architectural style: Beaux Arts
- MPS: Courthouses in South Carolina Designed by William Augustus Edwards TR
- NRHP reference No.: 81000706
- Added to NRHP: October 30, 1981

The Abbeville County Courthouse, built in 1908, is an historic courthouse located in the east corner of Court Square, in the city of Abbeville in Abbeville County, South Carolina. It was designed in the Beaux Arts style by Darlington native William Augustus Edwards who designed several other South Carolina courthouses as well as academic buildings at 12 institutions in Florida, Georgia and South Carolina. An arcade connects it to the adjoining Abbeville Opera House and Municipal Center, which Edwards also designed. In 1964, the courthouse was renovated by Lyles, Bissett, Carlisle, and Wolff of Columbia. On October 30, 1981, it was added to the National Register of Historic Places. It is included in the Abbeville Historic District.

== History ==
The current courthouse is the sixth courthouse to serve Abbeville County. The history of the previous courthouses is as follows:

- 1st Courthouse – Wooden frame building, pulled down in 1825
- 2nd Courthouse (c. 1825) – Two-story brick building demolished after discovery of workmen's fraud (kaolin used instead of lime in mortar)
- 3rd Courthouse (c. 1829) – Designed by Robert Mills during his residency in Abbeville; found to be sinking & deemed unsafe
- 4th Courthouse (c. 1853) – Destroyed by fire in 1872
- 5th Courthouse (c. 1875) – Replaced by present structure in 1908

== Artwork ==
Located inside the central hallway is a portrait of John C. Calhoun, twice vice-president and longtime senator from South Carolina. Calhoun was born southwest of the town on his father's plantation. He practiced law for a short time on the county square. The courthouse is located on land that once housed the law firm in which Calhoun practiced early in his career.

== See also ==
- Christopher Werner who did iron work for the 5th courthouse.
- List of Registered Historic Places in South Carolina
- List of county courthouses in South Carolina
- National Register of Historic Places listings in Abbeville County, South Carolina
