= Warrenton Presbyterian Church (Abbeville, South Carolina) =

Church building in South Carolina, United States

Coordinates: 34.1520589°N 82.4792944°W

- Warrenton Presbyterian Church
- Country: United States
- Denomination: Presbyterianism

Warrenton Presbyterian Church is a Presbyterian Church (USA) congregation located at 133 Watts Road near Abbeville in Abbeville County, South Carolina.

== History ==
=== Origins: 1884-1891 ===
The church was organized in 1884 by a group of Presbyterians meeting at the Warrenton High School. This group was officially constituted by Presbytery as a congregation on October 31, 1884, with 14 charter members. The first elders of the church were F. W. Wilson (Francis Walton Wilson) and George W. Wilson. H. Curtis Fennel was the first minister. W. H. Brooks gave an acre of land to the church in November 1884. F. W. Wilson, often called the "father of the Warrenton Church," directed the construction of the church building. The building was in use by August 1886, but it was still not completed until 1890. The church building was officially dedicated in May 1891.

=== 1895-1951 ===
In 1895, Fennel worked at a church in Toccoa, Georgia. Warrenton Presbyterian Church then joined with Rocky River, Lowndesville and Willington churches to call Luther Link to serve as pastor. Warrenton held worship twice monthly during this time.

Fennell returned in 1896 and continued to serve Warrenton until his death in 1927. The Warrenton Presbyterian Church struggled to continue after its longtime pastor died. James Bradley served until his death in 1930, just a few months after starting as Warrenton's pastor. For a few months in 1931, the A. F. Doty supplied the church with pastoral leadership. The Abbeville Presbyterian Church permitted their pastor, George Telford, to provide two afternoon services each month and served the church for a few months.

M. A. Durant began serving as the pastor of the little church in 1934 and continued until 1941. He returned to the church and served again from 1976 until 1978. He attended both the 50th and the 100th celebrations of the church's anniversary.

Harry B. Fraser served the church beginning in 1942. He was followed by Ben F. Ogletree. Under Ogletree's leadership, the church voted to build additional Sunday School classrooms, which were completed in 1951 at the cost of $4,000.

=== 1952-1978 ===
When Ogletree left in 1952, he was replaced by Allen B. Wells, who served until 1954. Wells was followed by Roy Coker. Coker led the Warrenton Church into a period of growth. Work on a new Sanctuary began in 1957. The church was completed in 1960 at the cost of $22,000. The first service held in the sanctuary was the funeral of James C. Morris (February 6, 1960). At the departure of Coker, two seminary students from Erskine Theological Seminary, Frank Neil and George McGill, began providing alternating preaching services at the rural church.

Bob Pettit started to serve the Warrenton Church in January 1962. When he left late in 1965, the church employed Timothy Fortner as a regular supply to serve until a full-time pastor could be secured. Sidney Ayer was started in 1967, while construction on a manse or parsonage was still being completed. During his ministry, the church reached its highest membership, 151 members. After Ayer, Charles Brown, Marion Canfield, and M.A. Durant served the church.

In 1978, Charles W. Davenport began to serve as pastor. During his ministry, the Session and Diaconate combined into a single unicameral Session.

=== 100th anniversary ===
When Davenport left in 1983, the church hired Maynard Pittendreigh as pastor. During his ministry, the buildings were refurbished, including the addition of a choir room and a museum. The church celebrated its 100th anniversary and a history of the church was written by Pittendreigh. A Presbyterian People was published by Commercial Press in 1986. The church also elected and ordained its first female elder, Helen Bosler.
