= Young Place =

Historic house in South Carolina, United States

- U.S. National Register of Historic Places
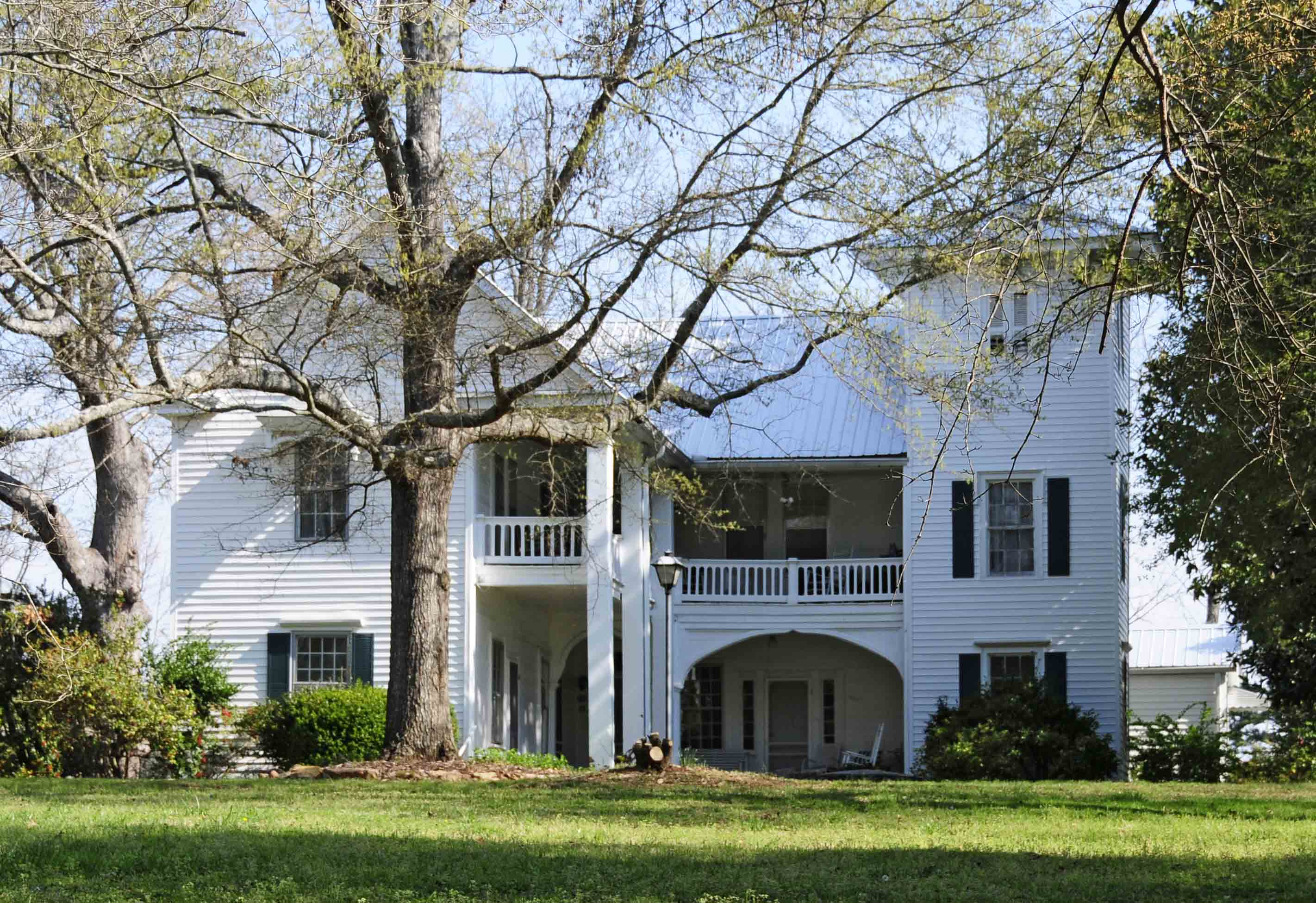

- Location within South Carolina Location within the United States
- Location: SC 185, Due West, South Carolina
- Coordinates: 34°19′59″N 82°23′56″W
- Area: 4.5 acres (1.8 ha)
- Built: 1839
- Architectural style: Italianate, Georgian
- NRHP reference No.: 74001818
- Added to NRHP: October 9, 1974

Young Place is a historic farmhouse in Due West, Abbeville County, South Carolina. It was the home of Reverend J.N. Young, a religious leader, teacher, and one of the founders of nearby Erskine College. The house was listed on the National Register of Historic Places.

== Architecture ==
Constructed around 1839, the farmhouse was remodeled after the Civil War into two stories, much along the lines of the Tuscan architecture. Exterior features include a cross gable roof and a square tower with a bracketed hipped roof.
