= Lindsay Cemetery =

Cemetery in South Carolina, USA

- U.S. National Register of Historic Places
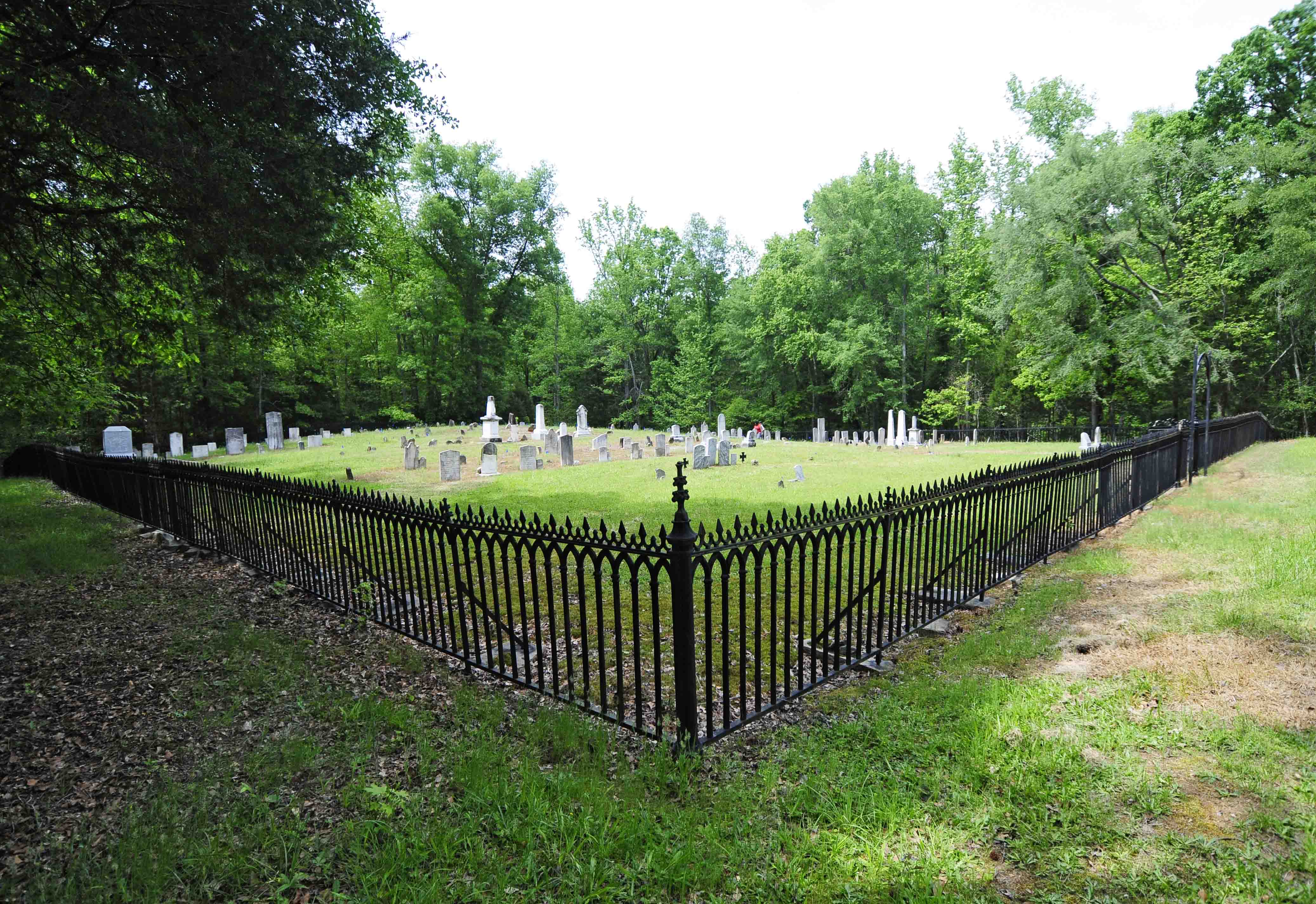
- Lindsay Cemetery

- Location within South Carolina Location within the United States
- Nearest city: Due West, South Carolina
- Coordinates: 34°18′1″N 82°24′58″W
- Area: less than one acre
- NRHP reference No.: 09000364
- Added to NRHP: May 27, 2009

Lindsay Cemetery, located outside the town of Due West, South Carolina, was established in 1820. Over 100 graves with inscriptions are inside the cast-iron fence that marks the perimeter of the cemetery. The earliest grave is from 1820, many are from 1820 to 1892, and the most recent is from 1927.

Lindsay was the first cemetery in the Due West area, and is very representative of the cemeteries of that era. Of particular note is that many of the Pratt family are buried there, a lineage that extends to President Jimmy Carter. The cemetery is on private land, and prior permission from town officials is required to visit the site. The site was listed in the National Historic Register on May 27, 2009.
