= Dixie High School (South Carolina) =

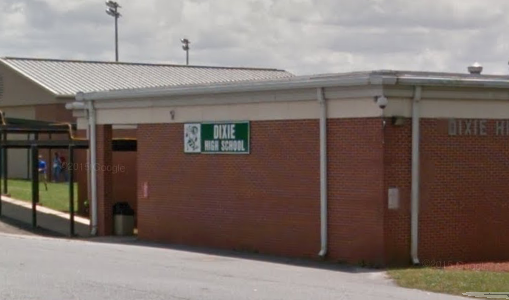

Location
- 1 Haynes Street; Due West, South Carolina, (Abbeville County) 29639; United States; 34°19′39″N 82°23′16″W

Information
- School district: Abbeville District 60
- CEEB code: 410665
- Principal: Paul Prescott
- Teaching staff: 30.00 (FTE)
- Grades: 7–12
- Enrollment: 488 (2023–2024)
- Student to teacher ratio: 16.27
- Colors: Kelly green and white
- Nickname: Hornets
- Website: dxhs.acsdsc.org

Dixie High School is a public school for grades 7–12 in Due West, South Carolina, United States. It is part of the Abbeville County School District.

As of 2015 it had an enrollment of 415 students. In 2024, US News ranked it 44th in South Carolina. It has a 16% minority population with 61% of students classified as economically disadvantaged.

== Athletics ==
Dixie High School participates in 12 varsity sports. In addition, football, volleyball, boys and girls basketball, baseball, boys and girls soccer, and softball teams participate in the junior varsity programs. Dixie High School's athletic teams are known as the Hornets.

Fall	Winter	Spring
Cross Country	Boys basketball	Baseball
Football	Girls basketball	Fishing
Volleyball	Wrestling	Golf
		Boys Soccer
		Girls Soccer
		Softball
		Track & Field

=== State championships ===
- Basketball - Boys: 1957, 1972
- Cross Country - Boys: 2016, 2020
- Cross Country - Girls: 2021, 2025
- Soccer - Boys: 2019, 2025
- Softball: 2014, 2016, 2019
- Volleyball: 1981, 1987, 1988

== Notable alumni ==
- Casey Ashley, professional bass fisherman and winner of the 2015 Bassmaster Classic.
- Jim Lauderdale, Grammy nominated American country, bluegrass, and Americana singer-songwriter.

== See also ==
- List of high schools in South Carolina
