= Secession Hill =

Coordinates: 34°10′44″N 82°22′30″W

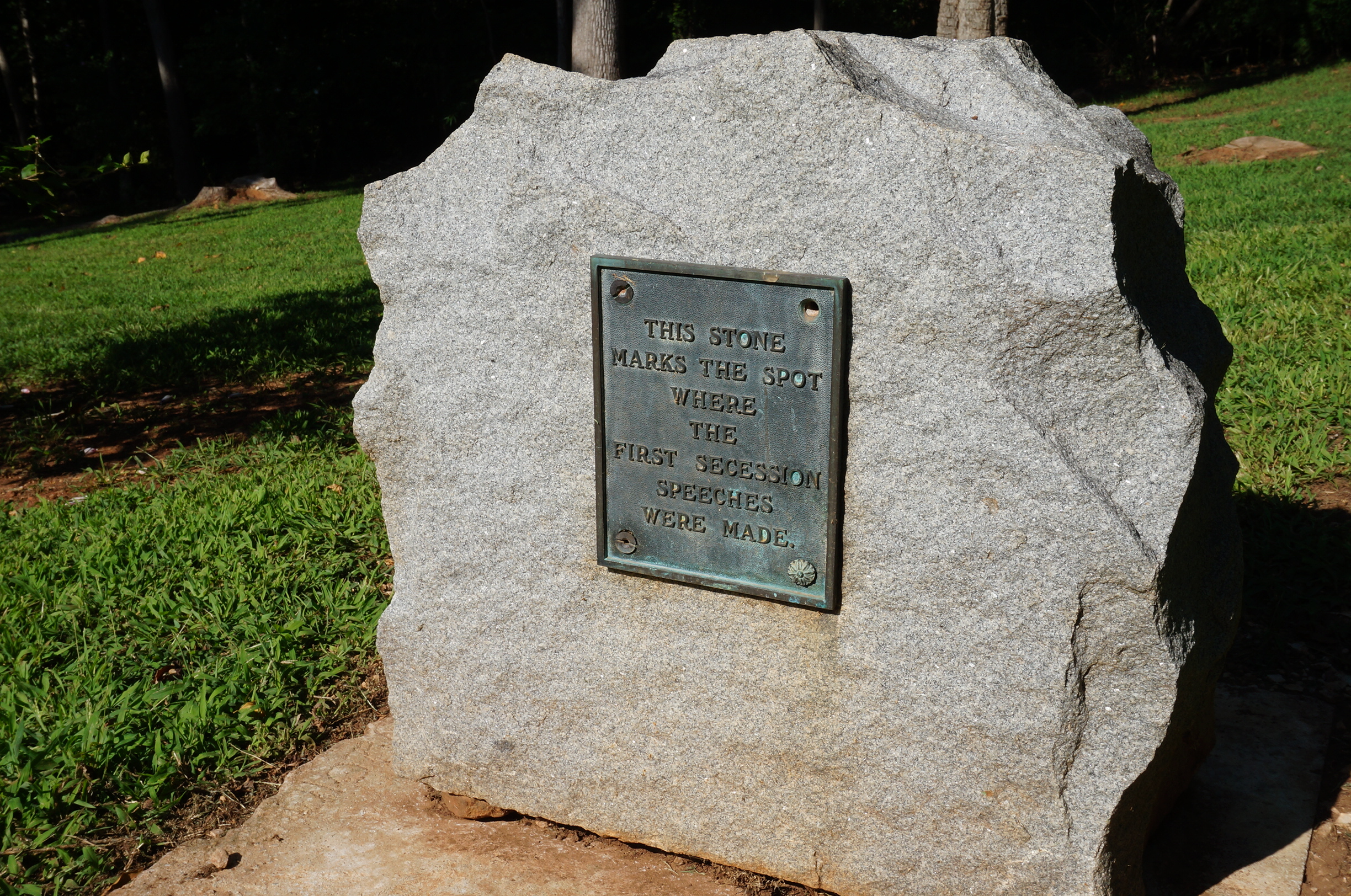
The rock at Secession Hill

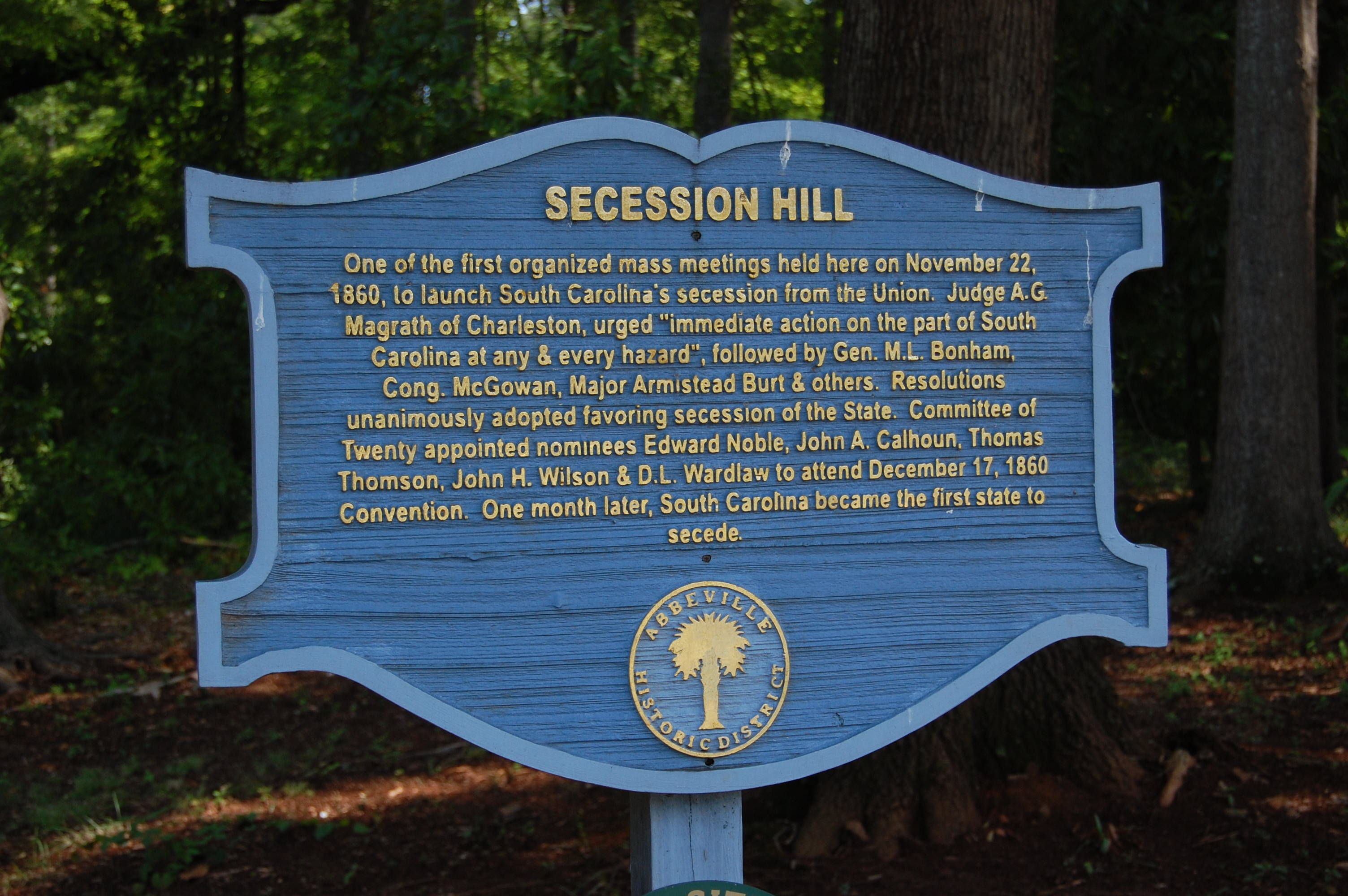
The Sign at Secession Hill

Secession Hill, just east of modern-day Secession Street in Abbeville, South Carolina, is the site where local citizens gathered on November 22, 1860 to adopt the ordinance of South Carolina's secession from the Union. It was here that delegates to the December 17, 1860 secession convention in Columbia, South Carolina were selected.

Abbeville is nicknamed "the birthplace of the Confederacy", as the meeting on Secession Hill ultimately led to its formation.

There is an unknown Confederate soldier from Alabama buried on Secession Hill.

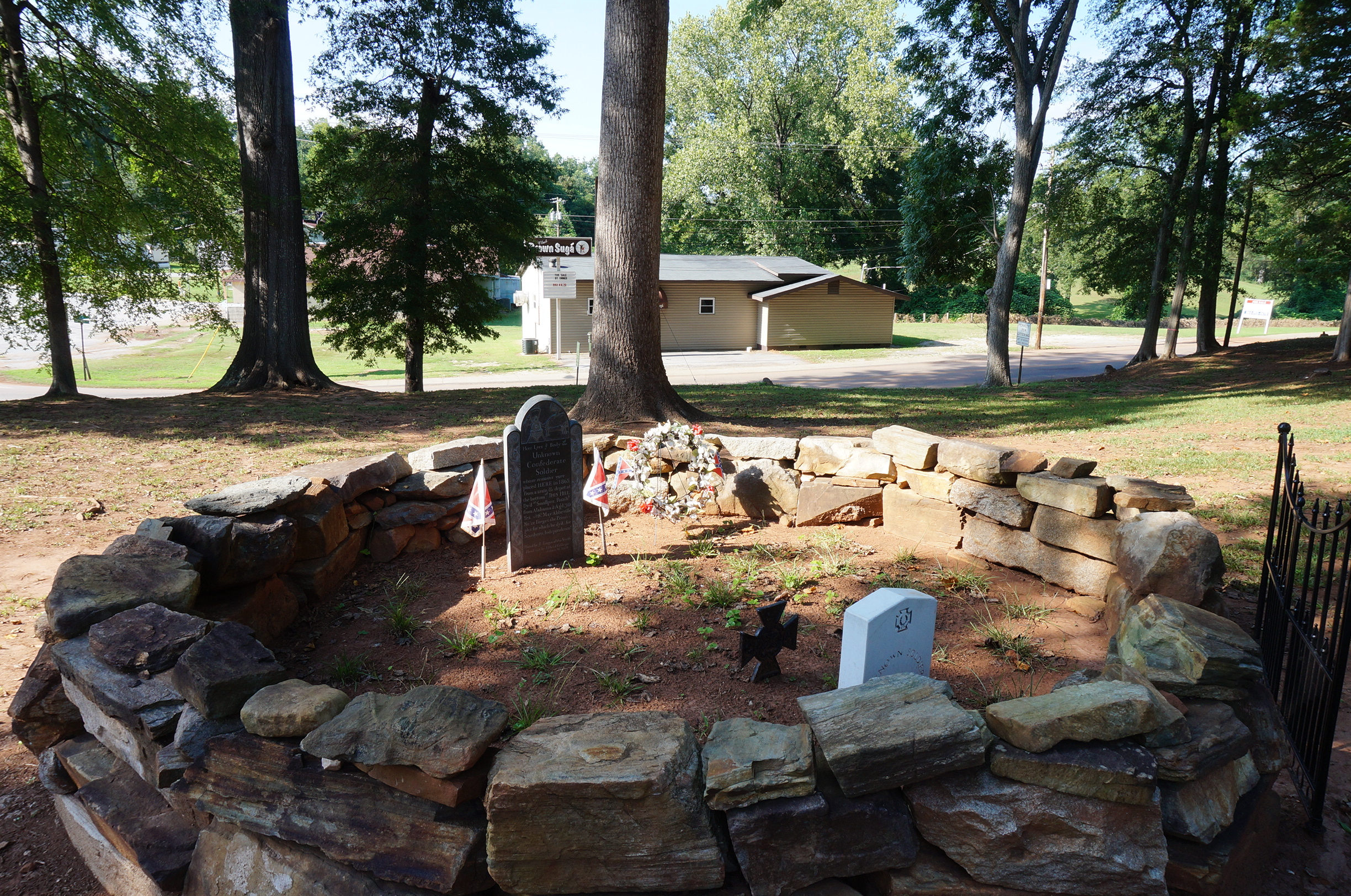
Memorial for Unknown Soldier

Today, Secession Hill is owned by the Columbia-based Southern Culture Centre, which plans to develop the site into a park. In 2018, another marker was added to the site.

== See also ==
- Declaration of the Immediate Causes Which Induce and Justify the Secession of South Carolina from the Federal Union
