= Patrick Calhoun Family Cemetery =

Cemetery in Abbeville County, South Carolina, US

- Calhoun, Patrick, Family Cemetery
- U.S. National Register of Historic Places
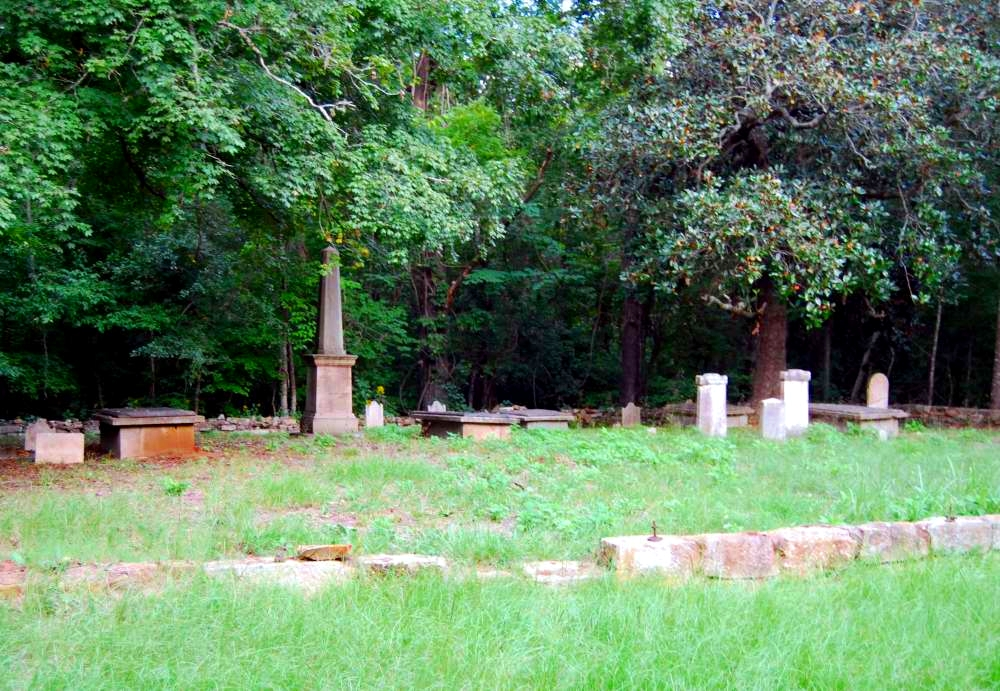

- Location within South Carolina Location within the United States
- Nearest city: Abbeville, South Carolina
- Coordinates: 34°3′43″N 82°26′45″W
- Area: less than one acre
- Built: 1844
- NRHP reference No.: 75001684
- Added to NRHP: August 28, 1975

The Patrick Calhoun Family Cemetery, located in Abbeville County, South Carolina, contains the graves of Patrick Calhoun and members of his family, who settled in Abbeville County in the 1750s. While Patrick achieved some fame as an Indian fighter, and later, as a South Carolina politician, he is perhaps best remembered as the father of John C. Calhoun, United States Senator and Vice President of the United States from 1824–1832. There are over two dozen graves in this rural and quiet cemetery. The landmark was listed in the National Historic Register on August 28, 1975.
