= Warrenton Presbyterian Church (Warrenton, Virginia) =

Coordinates: 38°42′46.3″N 77°47′34.2″W

Warrenton Presbyterian Church is a Presbyterian congregation in Warrenton, Virginia that was organized around 1780.

== Milestone events ==
- 1771 Presence of Presbyterians in Fauquier County (German community).
- c. 1780 Rev. Hezekiah James Balch, a graduate of the College of New Jersey (Princeton), organized at Fauquier Court-House the Warren Academy and was licensed by Donegal Presbytery to preach in Virginia and North Carolina.
- 1804 Rev. William Williamson, a Scotsman, opened a school at Middleburg and preached in Fauquier County. In 1809, he organized the united congregation of Middleburg and Fauquier Court-House.
- 1813 The “Brick Church” was erected on the south side of Main Street to serve both Presbyterian and Episcopalian congregations. The building was used by both denominations until 1849.
- 1827 Winchester Presbytery organized members south of Bull Run into a separate congregation named the Presbyterian Church of Warrenton.
- 1849 St. James Episcopal Church erected their building, and the Brick Church was destroyed by tornado.
- 1855 The present church site was purchased and a church building erected. The Warrenton congregation was combined with the Greenwich (Prince William County) congregation with one Session. The first minister was the Rev. John W. Pugh, who served until 1868.
- 1861-65 During the Civil War, the church building was occupied by Federal troops. Substantial damage was incurred.
- 1885 Rev. Walter H. Robertson was installed. He served until 1903, at which time the reported membership of the church was 103.
- 1905 Rev. William Chinn installed as pastor. A cement floor was laid in the assembly room, 1930 with a section for use as a Sunday School classroom.
- 1930s Moeller pipe organ dedicated; Board of Deacons established; sanctuary repaired and redecorated; gas furnace installed; membership of 169.
- 1945 The Church Manse at the corner of High and Liberty Streets was purchased for $17,500.
- 1953 Educational wing was constructed with classrooms, a pastor's study, two small offices, and restrooms.
- 1962 Small lot and house directly behind the church on Fourth Street purchased. The dwelling was renovated and used by Sunday School classes.
- 1972 Potomac Presbytery of the Presbyterian Church, U.S. and Washington City Presbytery of the United Presbyterian Church in the U.S.A. united to form National Capital Union Presbytery.
- 1974 Corner lot and building to the East on Main Street purchased. A Noack pipe organ was built at a cost of $29,000.
- 1978 A second educational wing was added.
- 1987 J. Richard Winter, pastor since 1951 and church historian, retired. William Orders retained as interim pastor.
- 1988 Carl R. Schmahl installed as Pastor.
- 1999 New Sanctuary and Fellowship Hall built.
- 2000 New Pipe Organ and Concert Grand Piano dedicated (Randall Dyer Pipe Organ – 19 ranks)
- 2016 James E. Lunde installed as Pastor.
