= Abbeville Opera House =

- U.S. National Register of Historic Places
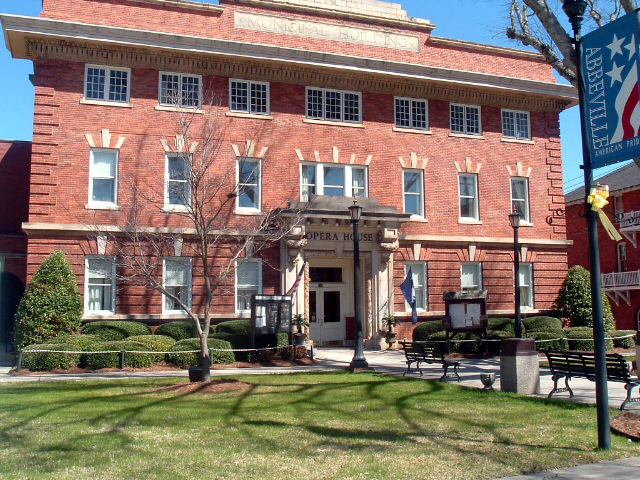

- Location within South Carolina Location within the United States
- Location: Carthouse Square, Abbeville, South Carolina
- Coordinates: 34°10′40″N 82°22′42″W
- Area: less than one acre
- Built: 1904
- Architect: William Augustus Edwards of Edwards and Wilson
- NRHP reference No.: 70000558
- Added to NRHP: July 1, 1970

The Abbeville Opera House, also known as the Abbeville Opera House and Municipal Office Building, is an historic building located in Abbeville, South Carolina. Designed by William Augustus Edwards of Edwards and Wilson, it was opened in 1904 and dedicated in 1908. On July 1, 1970, it was added to the National Register of Historic Places.

According to the South Carolina Department of Parks, Recreation and Tourism the theater has received the South Carolina Governor's Travel Award for Tourism and was designated as the Official Rural Drama State Theatre of South Carolina. It is included in the Abbeville Historic District.

== History ==
At the turn of the 20th century there were many "road companies" producing shows in New York City. Once the production was assembled, the show traveled throughout the country. One of the more popular tours went from New York to Richmond to Atlanta. For a number of years, Abbeville was an overnight stop for the entire touring company. Several members of the community decided that if this area had a facility, since the travelling companies were coming through the area anyway, Abbeville could sponsor some of these touring productions.

On October 1, 1908, what was then the Abbeville District dedicated a new Abbeville County Courthouse and City Hall. The grand old theatre, now known as the Abbeville Opera House was "equal in beauty of architecture and modern conveniences of any in the state," according to regional newspaper accounts of the day. From that time on, all the "greats and near greats" played on the Opera House stage. Vaudeville was in its "heyday" as was Abbeville and the Abbeville Opera House.

Today, most people who visit the historic Abbeville Opera House see a building that serves as a microcosm of Abbeville's history since the turn of the century. Efforts toward preservation and renewal of Abbeville and the renewal of the Abbeville Opera House began some thirty years ago. The refurbished theatre operates year-round. The 218 newly refurbished seats face a 7,800-square-foot (720 m^{2}) stage. The balcony has 92 seats, and the turn-of-the-20th-century boxes seat up to 6 people in each of the four box seats.
