= Abbeville County School District =

School district in South Carolina

District information
- Superintendent: Dr. Lori Brownlee-Brewton
- Chair of the board: Keith Dunn
- NCES District ID: 4500690

Other information
- Website: www.acsdsc.org

Abbeville County School District (ACSD) is a school district serving Abbeville County, South Carolina, United States. As of 2006 it serves some 3,700 students in all. Schools include Abbeville High School and Dixie High School.

The school district takes up the majority, though not all of, Abbeville County.
