= Georgetown Historic District (Georgetown, South Carolina) =

Historic district in South Carolina, United States

- U.S. National Register of Historic Places
- U.S. Historic district
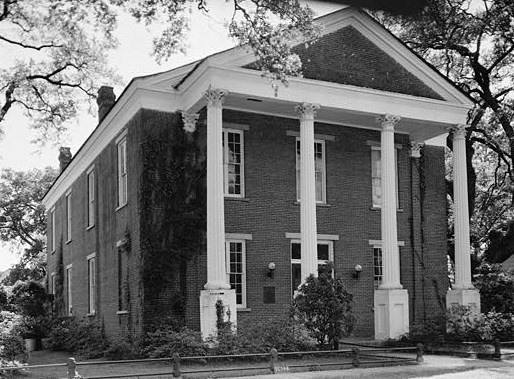
- Winyah Indigo Society Hall, HABS Photo, May 1958

- Location within South Carolina Location within the United States
- Location: Along N side of Sampit River, Georgetown, South Carolina
- Coordinates: 33°21′58″N 79°16′51″W
- Area: 220 acres (89 ha)
- Built: 1729 (297 years ago)
- Architectural style: Colonial
- NRHP reference No.: 71000781
- Added to NRHP: October 14, 1971

Georgetown Historic District is a national historic district located at Georgetown, Georgetown County, South Carolina. The district encompasses 49 contributing buildings in the central business district of Georgetown. The oldest existing structure in Georgetown is a dwelling which dates from about 1737. There are approximately 28 additional 18th century structures as well as 18 buildings erected during the 19th century prior to the American Civil War. The existing structures—homes, churches, public buildings—are of both historical and architectural significance and are situated on heavily shaded, wide streets. The architecture ranges from the simplicity of early colonial, or Georgian, to the elaborate rice plantation era, such as Classical Revival. Notable buildings include the Georgetown County Courthouse, U.S. Post Office, The Rice Museum (Old Market Building), Winyah Indigo Society Hall, Masonic Lodge, Antipedo Baptist Church Cemetery, Prince George Winyah Episcopal Church complex, St. Mary's Catholic Church, Kaminski Building, Mary Man House, Dr. Charles Fyffe / Middleton House, John Cleland / Allston House, Samuel Sampson / Henning-Ward House, Robert Stewart / George Pawley House, Martha Allston Pyatt /John S. Pyatt House, Eleazar Waterman / Withers House, and William Waties / Withers House.

It was listed on the National Register of Historic Places in 1971.

== Gallery ==
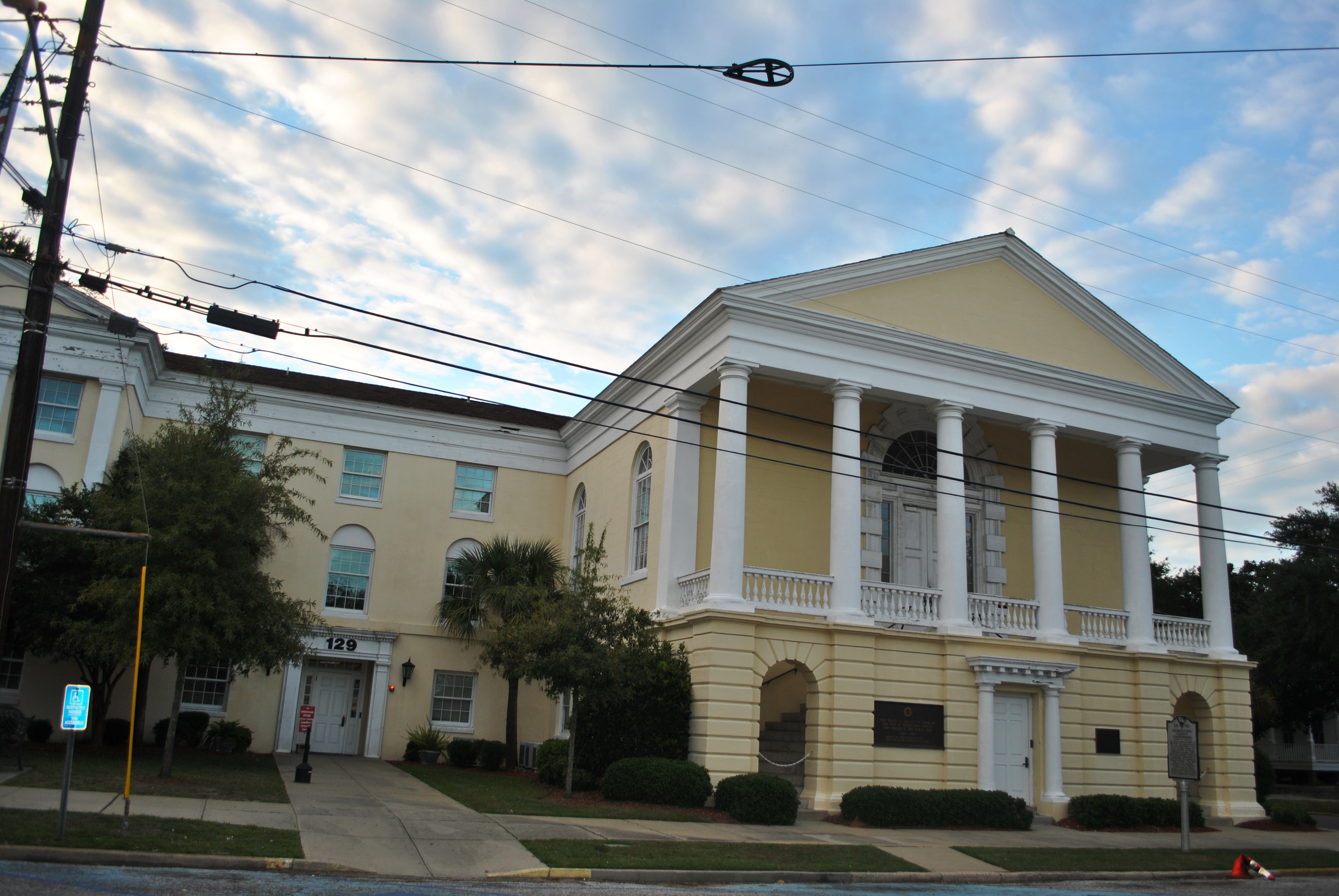
Georgetown County Courthouse

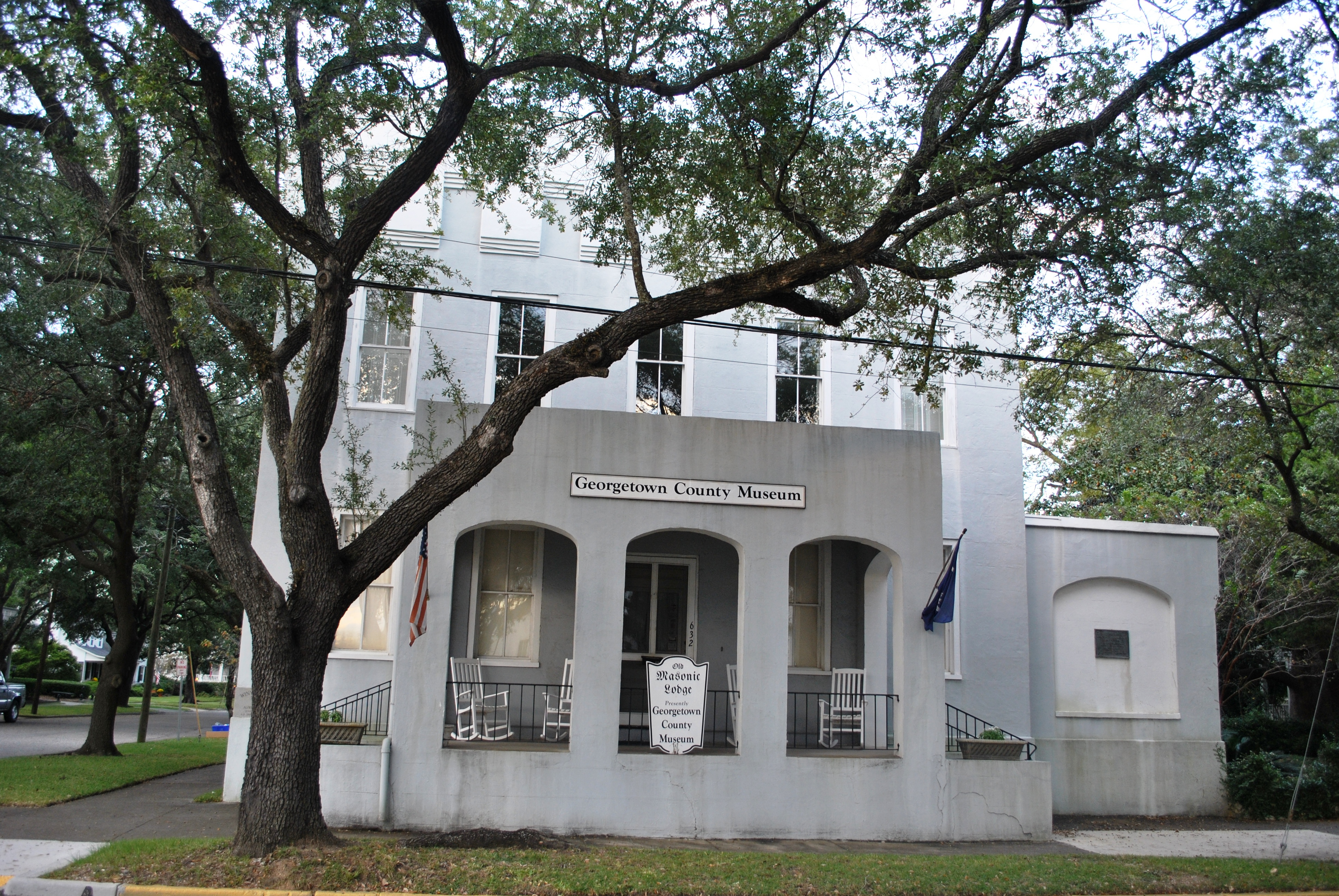
Old Colonial Banking House

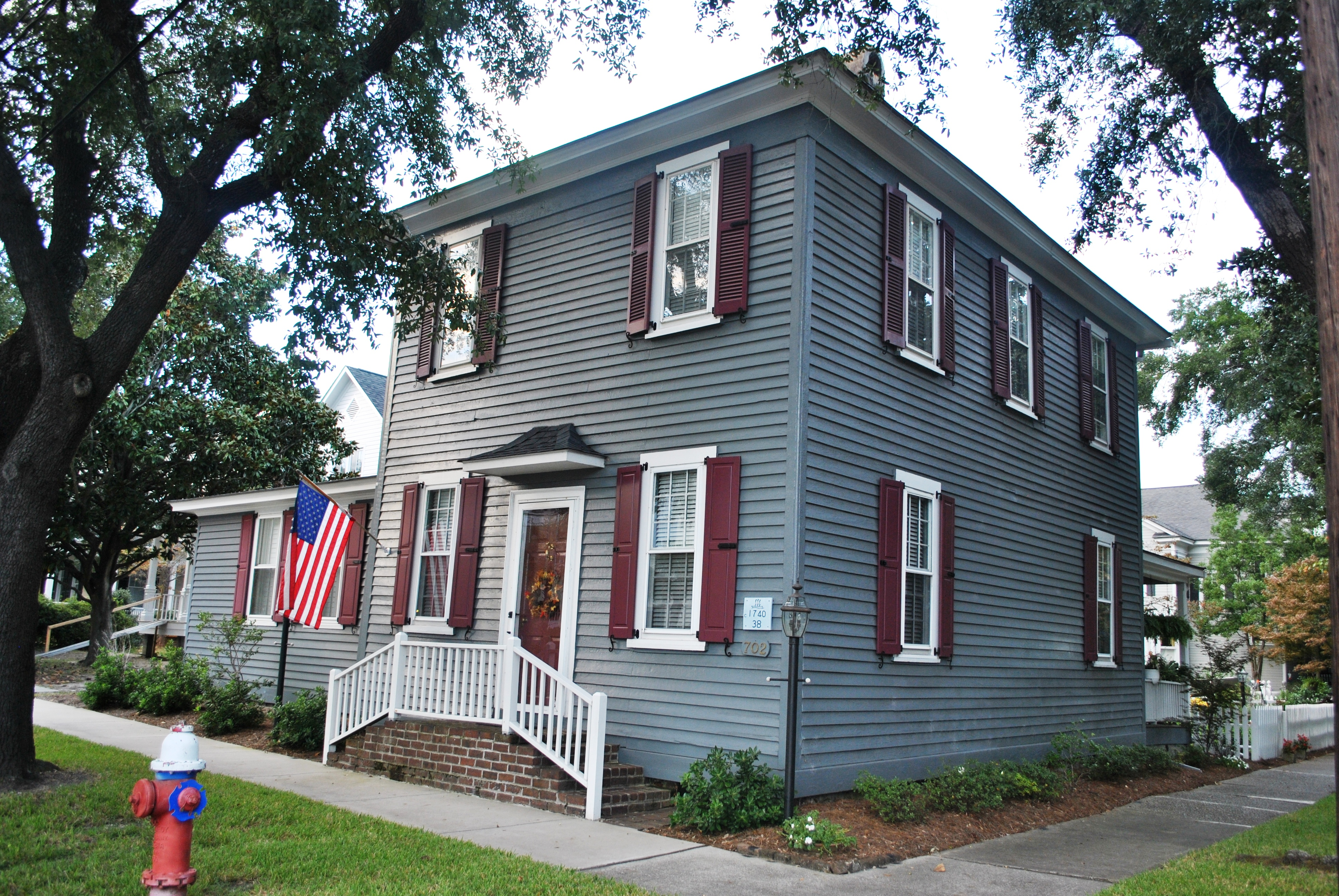
Georgetown Historic District, 1740

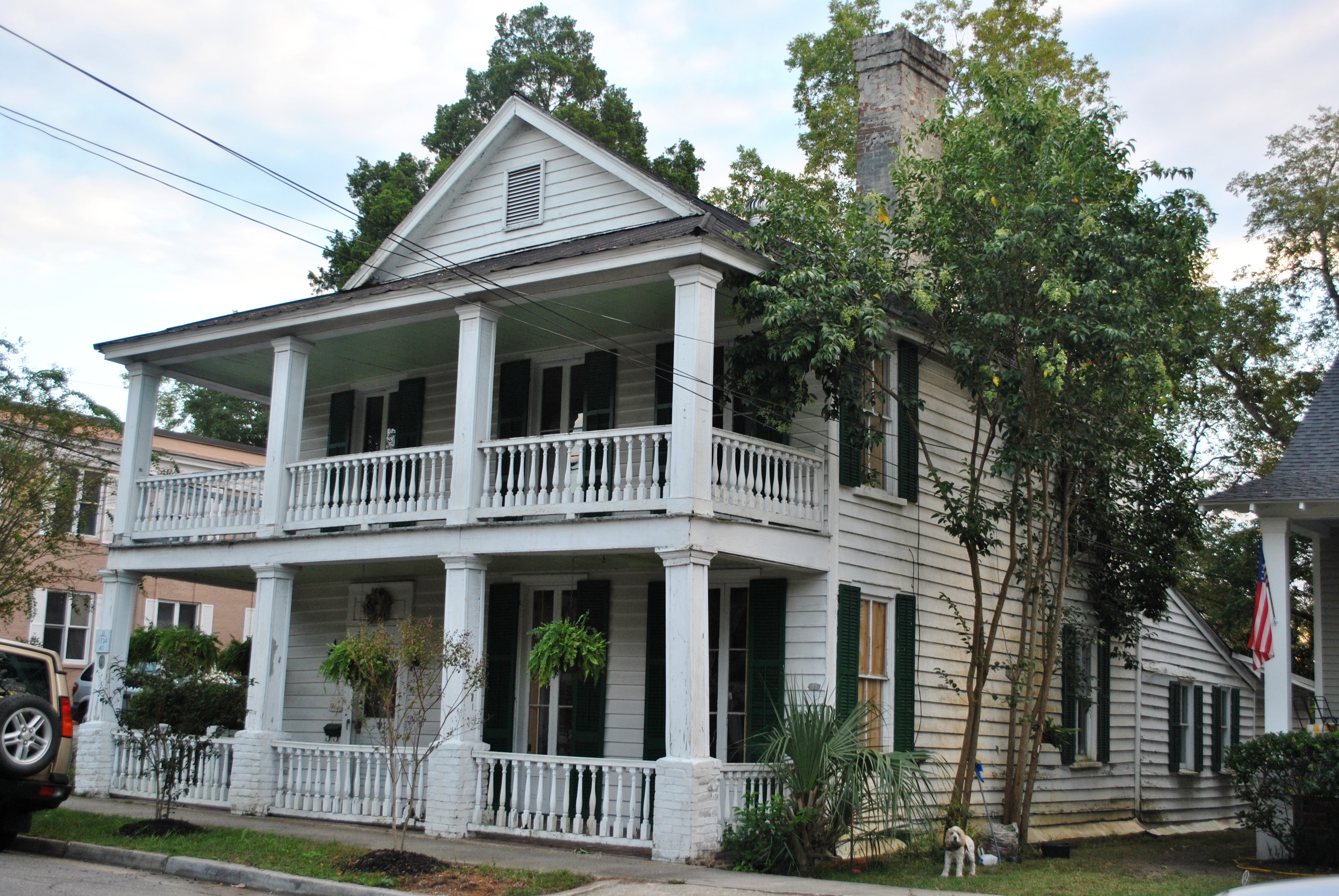
Georgetown Historic District, 1734

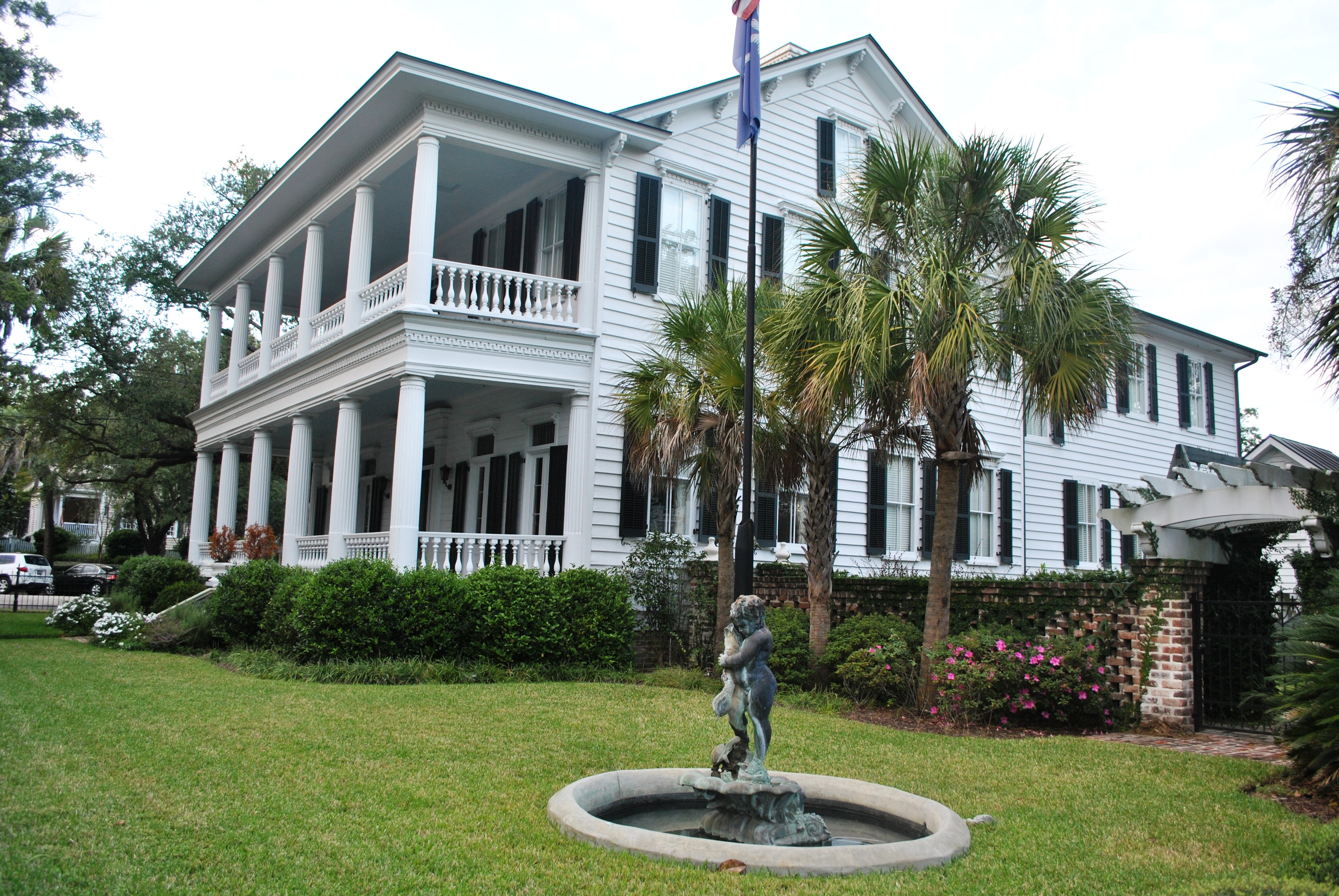
William Doyle Morgan House

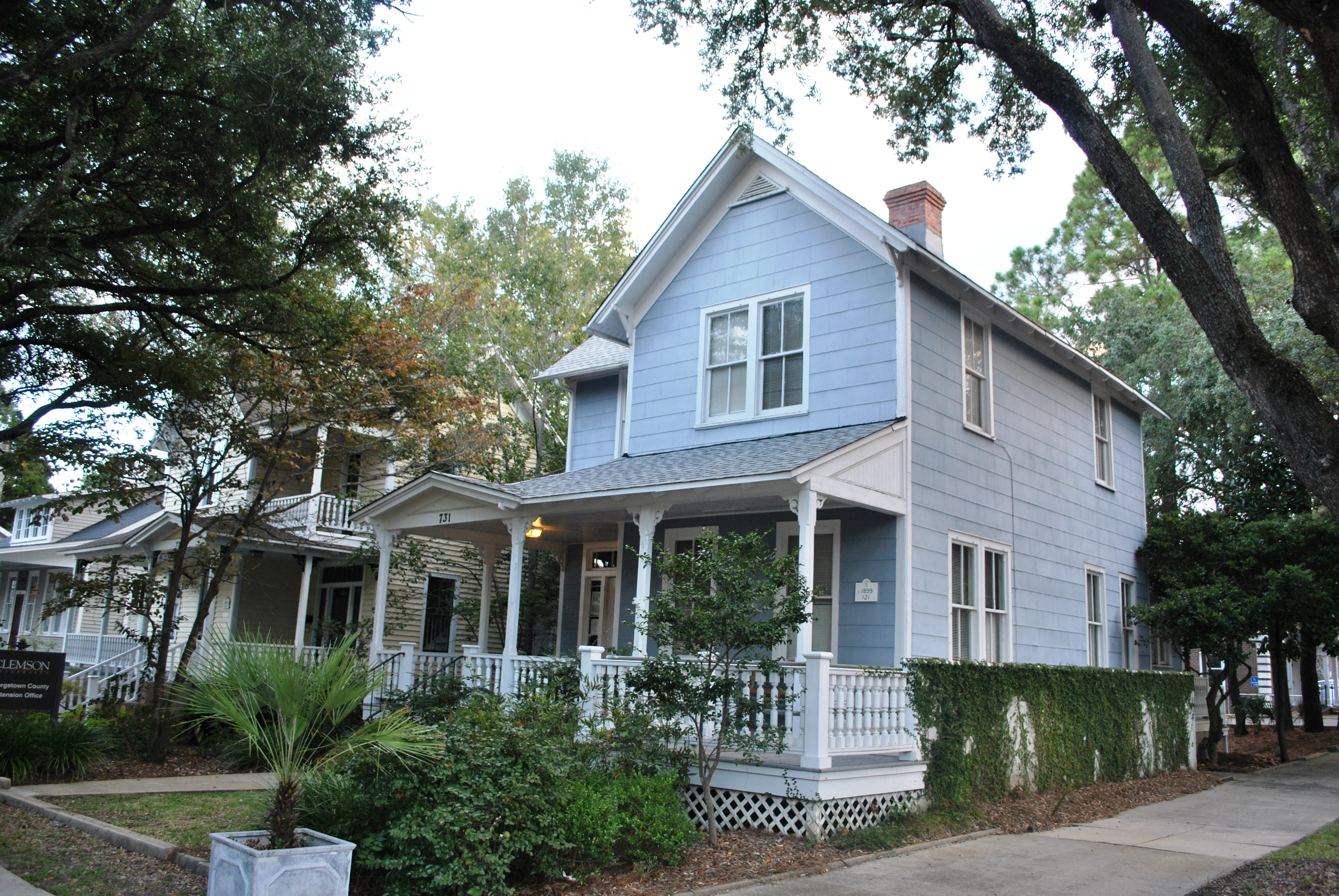
Georgetown Historic District, 1899

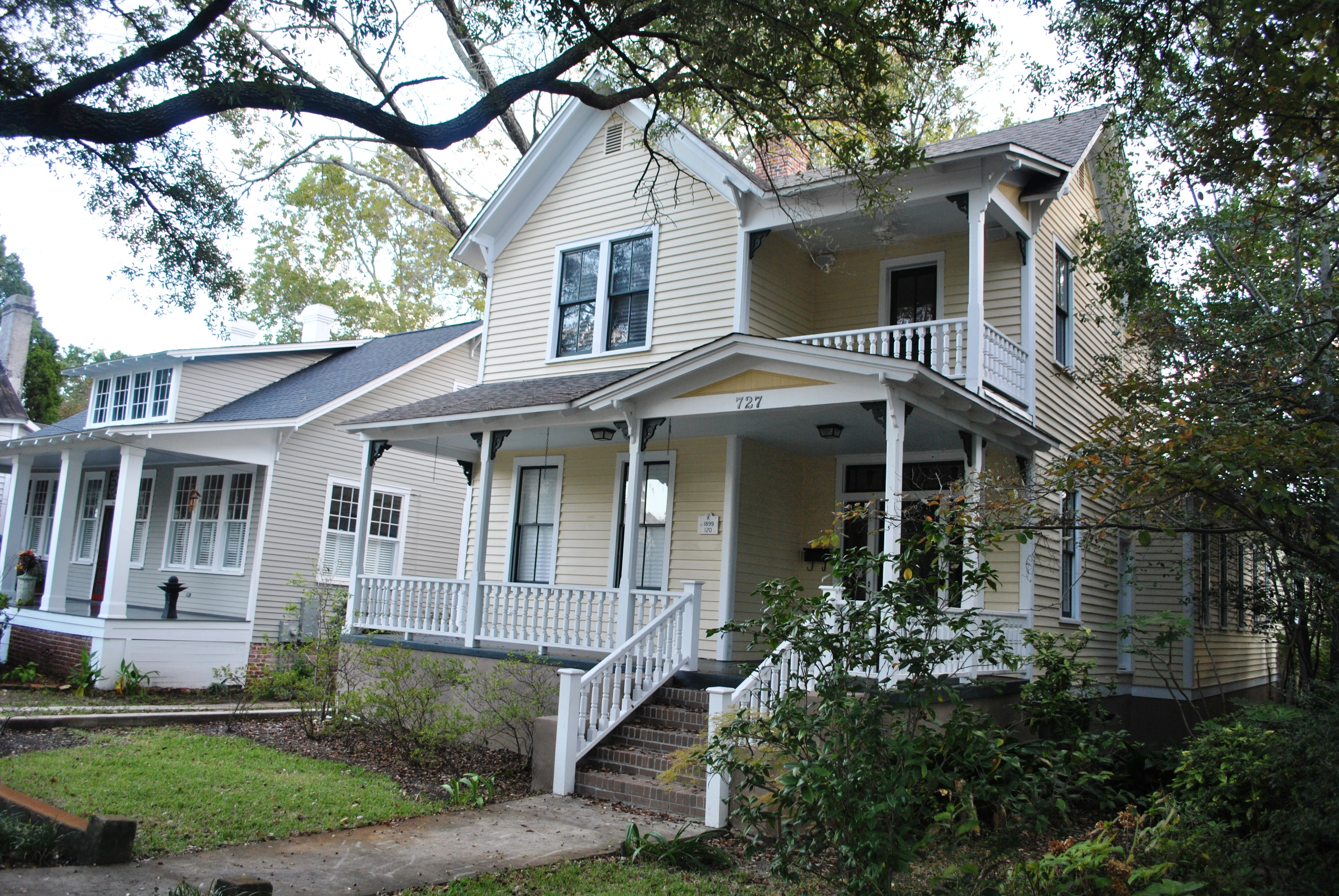
Georgetown Historic District, 1899

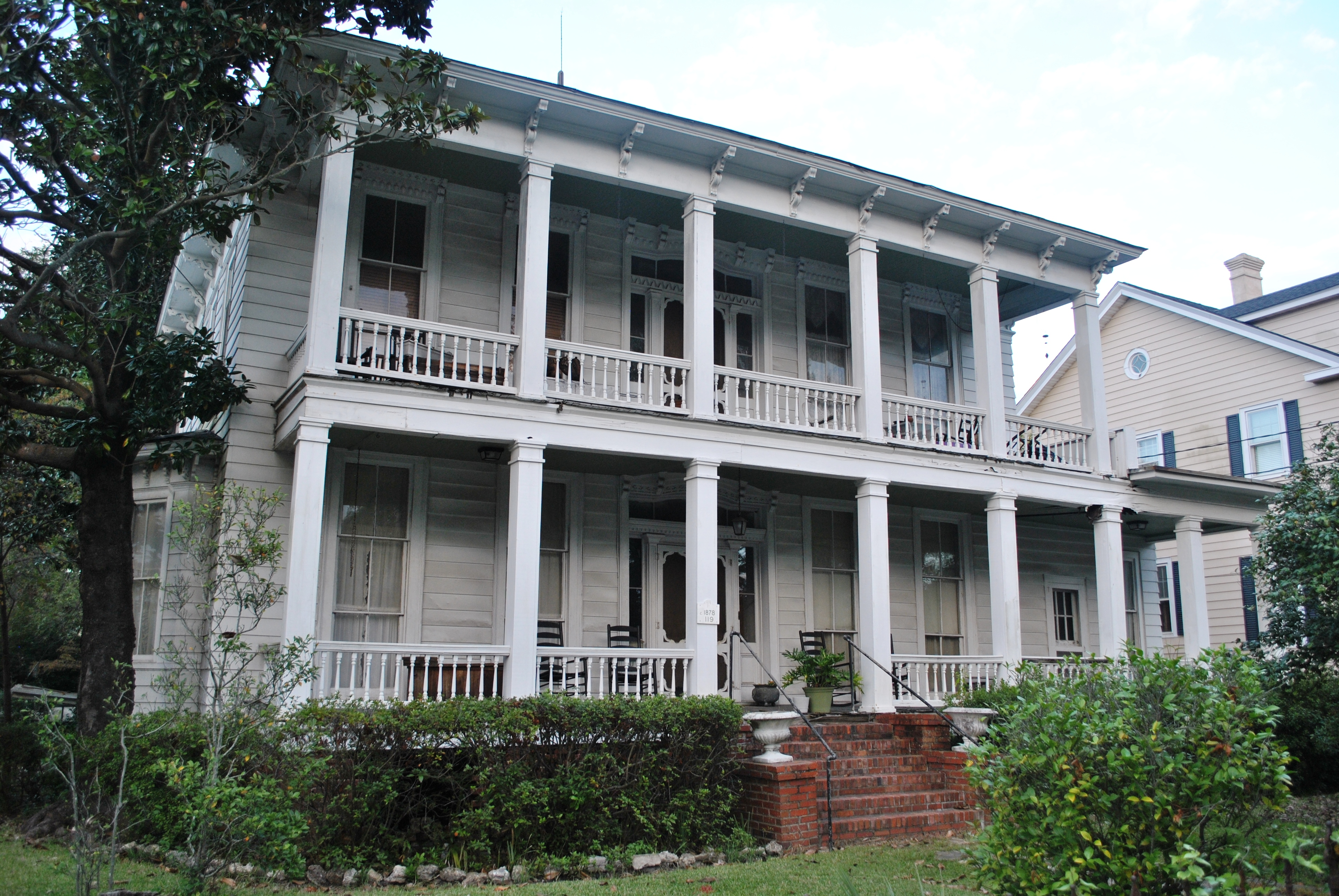
Georgetown Historic District, 1878

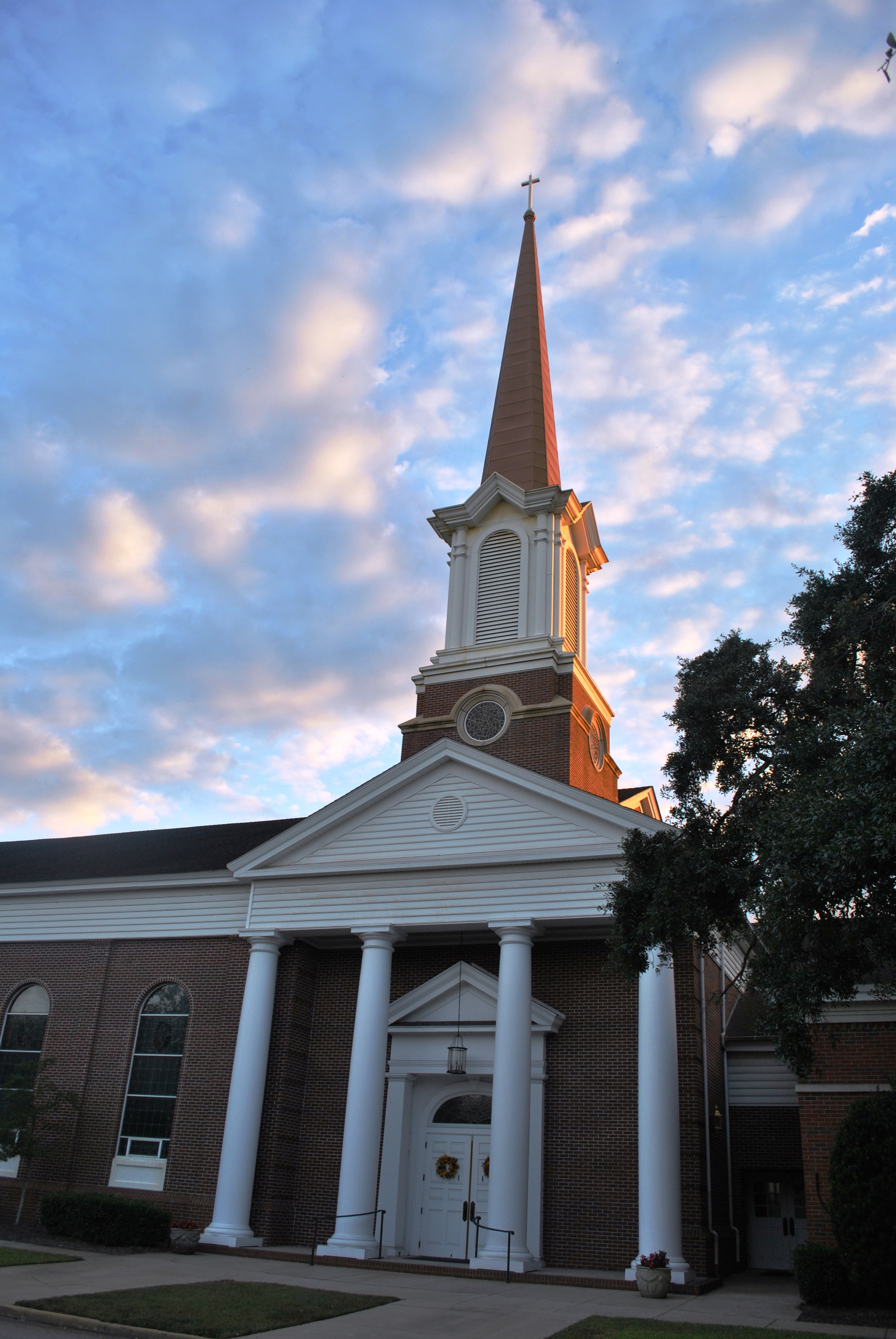
Antipedo Baptist Church

== See also ==
- National Register of Historic Places listings in Georgetown County, South Carolina
