= Burt-Stark Mansion =

Historic house in South Carolina, United States

- U.S. National Register of Historic Places
- U.S. National Historic Landmark
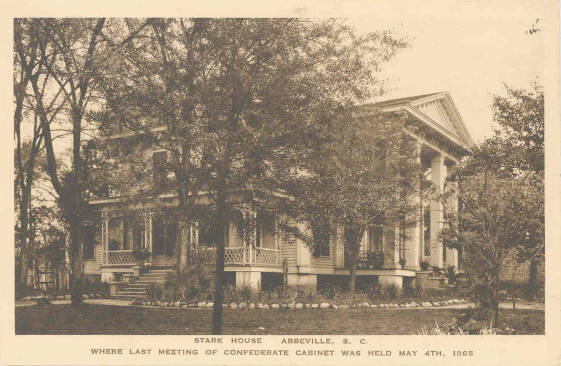
- Stark House

- Location within South Carolina Location within the United States
- Location: 306 N. Main St., Abbeville, South Carolina
- Coordinates: 34°10′52″N 82°22′59″W
- Area: 3.5 acres (1.4 ha)
- Built: 1830s
- Architect: Lesley, David; Cubic (slave)
- Architectural style: Greek Revival
- NRHP reference No.: 70000559

Significant dates
- Added to NRHP: April 3, 1970
- Designated NHL: October 5, 1992

The Burt-Stark Mansion, also known as Armistead Burt House, in Abbeville, South Carolina was the site of the last Council of War of cabinet members of the Confederate government. On May 2, 1865, Jefferson Davis, hoping to continue the struggle, met unanimous opposition and realized the Confederate independence cause was lost.

It was declared a National Historic Landmark in 1992 for being where Davis had his last council of war.

== History ==
The property has had seven owners. The original owner, David Lesley, owned it until he died in 1855. He had hired Johnson, an English landscaper, to organize the property. The next owner was a Presbyterian pastor, Thomas A. Hoyt, who owned it until 1859 when he was sent to another church in Louisville, Kentucky. A banker from Charleston, South Carolina, Andrew Simonds, bought it from Hoyt and, in 1862, sold it to Armistead Burt, who owned it when Jefferson Davis used the building.

Davis' wife, Varina Davis, had met Armistead Burt when Jefferson Davis first entered the United States Congress in December 1845. Burt invited Varina Davis and her children to his house, as Varina was sent away from Richmond, Virginia. Varina suggested to Burt that U.S. soldiers might eventually burn the house for harboring her, but he said there would be no greater cause than for his house to be burnt for. Varina moved to the mansion on April 17. Days later, after Varina fled further south, Davis came to the house.

On May 2, 1865, between four and six in the afternoon, Jefferson Davis held his final war council, with Secretary of War John C. Breckinridge, Secretary of State Judah P. Benjamin, and several military officers, most notable of them Braxton Bragg and Basil W. Duke. Davis wanted to continue the fight, using the forces west of the Mississippi River, but the others disagreed. When Davis asked the men why they were still there, they replied it was to ensure Davis got to safety. After fuming for several minutes, Davis resigned himself to the decision of the others, effectively ending the existence of the Confederate States of America. However, the last land Confederate force to surrender would not be until June 24, when Stand Watie surrendered in Oklahoma; the last Confederate naval vessel surrendered at Liverpool later that year. After the Abbeville meeting, the cabinet, Davis, a 3,000-strong protective force, and the Confederate treasury dispersed.

After the war, in 1868, Burt sold the house in bankruptcy. A local planter, James R. Norwood, bought it; when he died in 1875, his widow and daughter inherited it. James Samuel Stark and his wife bought it from them in 1900 and restored the building. On their death, their daughter Mary Stark Davis inherited it. After Davis died in the fall of 1987, the Abbeville Historic Preservation Commission was given control of the house and has operated tours of it ever since.

== Construction ==
The house is a white Greek Revival style two-story house with a frame structure and lap siding. A front pedimented portico, also two stories high, is supported by four square columns. Underneath this is a small wooden latticework second-story balcony. It has a brick foundation with wooden walls. The roof is made of aluminum and tin, with both asphalt and cedar shingles. The shutters on all the windows are original. There were several exterior buildings, but the only one still standing was the kitchen; the other buildings on the property were a carriage house, cow barn, milk house, smokehouse, and well house. Spacious rooms and high ceilings mark the interior. A central great hall with an Adam fanlight is the main entrance to the domicile, with a drawing room on each side. Jefferson Davis held his final war council with John C. Breckinridge, his Secretary of War, and senior military officials in the left drawing room. Before the war, the wide double doors would open to create a ballroom from the entire front area. After the war, the only additions to the house were a bathroom and a northwest corner wing, which provided extra kitchen space. Most of the furnishings are from the 1850s and 1860s.

It was built in the 1830s by David Lesley, a local attorney, judge, planter, and Presbyterian Church elder. Lesley had seen a house in the Northern United States that he liked and chose that house as the prototype for his own. He sent Cubic, an enslaved man who was a master carpenter, to look at the prototype house, and he then oversaw the construction of Lesley's reproduction.
