= National Register of Historic Places listings in McCormick County, South Carolina =

Location of McCormick County in South Carolina

This is a list of the National Register of Historic Places listings in McCormick County, South Carolina.

This is intended to be a complete list of the properties and districts on the National Register of Historic Places in McCormick County, South Carolina, United States. The locations of National Register properties and districts for which the latitude and longitude coordinates are included below, may be seen in a map.

There are 22 properties and districts listed on the National Register in the county. Another property was once listed but has been removed.

This National Park Service list is complete through NPS recent listings posted May 1, 2026.

== Current listings ==
	Name on the Register	Image	Date listed	Location	City or town	Description
1	Bracknell's Store Complex		January 7, 2026 (#100012507)	101, 103, & 105 S. Depot Street; 33°50′55″N 82°15′33″W	Plum Branch	
2	Calhoun Mill	Calhoun Mill	November 24, 1980 (#80003679)	Northeast of Mount Carmel; 34°02′03″N 82°28′29″W	Mount Carmel	
3	Calhoun-Gibert House	Calhoun-Gibert House	March 12, 1996 (#96000220)	Secondary Road 33-60; 33°58′20″N 82°28′25″W	Willington	
4	Dorn Gold Mine		December 12, 1985 (#85003341)	Address restricted	McCormick	
5	Dorn's Flour and Grist Mill	Dorn's Flour and Grist Mill	July 12, 1976 (#76002158)	South Carolina Highway 28; 33°54′48″N 82°17′48″W	McCormick	
6	Joseph Jennings Dorn House	Joseph Jennings Dorn House	December 12, 1985 (#85003342)	Gold and Oak Sts. 33°54′50″N 82°17′37″W	McCormick	
7	Eden Hall	Eden Hall	September 23, 1980 (#80003678)	6 miles northeast of McCormick off U.S. Route 221 and South Carolina Highway 24; 33°59′19″N 82°15′09″W	McCormick	
8	Farmer's Bank	Farmer's Bank	December 12, 1985 (#85003343)	Main St. 33°54′45″N 82°17′37″W	McCormick	
9	John Albert Gibert M.D. House	John Albert Gibert M.D. House	May 27, 1993 (#93000441)	Secondary Road 7, 0.2 miles south of its junction with Secondary Road 110; 33°55′33″N 82°25′09″W	McCormick	
10	Guillebeau House	Guillebeau House	March 7, 1973 (#73002136)	Hickory Knob State Park; 33°56′47″N 82°26′36″W	Willington	
11	Otway Henderson House	Otway Henderson House	December 12, 1985 (#85003344)	Augusta St. 33°54′53″N 82°17′27″W	McCormick	
12	Hopewell Rosenwald School	Hopewell Rosenwald School	June 9, 2010 (#10000340)	Adjacent to 253 Hopewell Church Road (SC Sec RD 33-12); 33°36′25″N 82°07′12″W	Clarks Hill	
13	Hotel Keturah	Hotel Keturah	December 12, 1985 (#85003345)	Main St. 33°54′43″N 82°17′40″W	McCormick	
14	Long Cane Massacre Site	Long Cane Massacre Site	January 27, 1983 (#83002203)	West of Troy off South Carolina Highway 10; 33°59′41″N 82°20′23″W	Troy	
15	Lower Long Cane Associate Reformed Presbyterian Church	Lower Long Cane Associate Reformed Presbyterian Church	October 6, 1999 (#98000426)	Secondary Route 33-36, 4 miles west of Troy; 34°00′58″N 82°20′57″W	Troy	
16	McCormick County Courthouse	McCormick County Courthouse	December 12, 1985 (#85003346)	South Carolina Highway 28; 33°54′38″N 82°17′42″W	McCormick	
17	McCormick County Office Building		January 2, 2024 (#100009699)	201 East Augusta Street; 33°54′43″N 82°17′35″W	McCormick	
18	McCormick Train Station	McCormick Train Station	December 12, 1985 (#85003347)	Main St. 33°54′42″N 82°17′36″W	McCormick	
19	Mount Carmel Historic District	Mount Carmel Historic District	June 22, 1982 (#82003895)	South Carolina Highways 81 and 823; 34°00′30″N 82°30′28″W	Mount Carmel	
20	Price's Mill	Price's Mill	November 22, 1972 (#72001465)	East of Parksville on South Carolina Highway 138 at Steven's Creek; 33°47′39″N 82°11′43″W	Parksville	
21	M.L.B. Sturkey House	M.L.B. Sturkey House	December 12, 1985 (#85003348)	Main and Washington Sts. 33°54′38″N 82°17′28″W	McCormick	
22	Sylvania	Sylvania	November 28, 1977 (#77001533)	South of Bradley off South Carolina Highway 10; 34°00′35″N 82°14′24″W	Bradley	

== Former listing ==
	Name on the Register	Image	Date listed	Date removed	Location	City or town	Description
1	Long Cane Covered Bridge		December 22, 1977 (#77001512)	August 31, 1979	3 mi. W of Troy on SC 36; 34°00′52″N 82°20′39″W	Troy vicinity	Destroyed by arsonist on July 8, 1979.

== See also ==
- List of National Historic Landmarks in South Carolina
- National Register of Historic Places listings in South Carolina
