= South Carolina Highway 283 =

State highway in South Carolina, United States

South Carolina Highway 283

Route information
- Maintained by SCDOT
- Length: 17.840 mi (28.711 km)

Major junctions
- West end: US 221 / SC 28 in Plum Branch
- East end: US 25 northwest of Edgefield

Location
- Country: United States
- State: South Carolina
- Counties: McCormick, Edgefield

Highway system
- South Carolina State Highway System; Interstate; US; State; Scenic
← SC 281	→ SC 284

South Carolina Highway 283 (SC 283) is a 17.840-mile-long (28.711 km) state highway in the U.S. state of South Carolina. The highway connects Plum Branch with rural areas of McCormick and Edgefield counties.

== Route description ==
SC 283 begins at an intersection with U.S. Route 221 (US 221)/SC 28 (Main Street) in Plum Branch, within McCormick County, where the roadway continues as Collier Street. It travels to the east and nearly immediately curves to the east-northeast before leaving the city limits. The highway curves back to the east and crosses over Stevens Creek. SC 283 goes back to the northeast and enters Whitetown. Just past the intersection with Upper Mill Road the highway enters Sumter National Forest. After it starts heading to the east-southeast, it crosses over Byrd Creek. After a crossing of Wine Creek, it crosses over Turkey Creek and enters Edgefield County. Just to the east of an intersection with North Martintown Road, which is south-southwest of Cleora, the highway leaves the national forest. Farther to the east, it meets its eastern terminus, an intersection with US 25, at a point northwest of Edgefield.

== Major intersections ==
County	Location	mi	km	Destinations	Notes
McCormick	Plum Branch	0.000	0.000	US 221 / SC 28 (Main Street) / Collier Street – Parksville, Augusta, McCormick, Greenwood	Western terminus
Edgefield		17.840	28.711	US 25 – Edgefield, Greenwood	Eastern terminus
1.000 mi = 1.609 km; 1.000 km = 0.621 mi
