= Keturah (disambiguation) =

Keturah was a concubine and later wife of biblical patriarch Abraham. It may also refer to:

== People (given name) ==
- Keturah Anderson (born 1968), Canadian athlete
- Keturah Kamugasa (d. 2017), Ugandan writer and journalist
- Keturah Sorrell (1912–2012), English opera singer (soprano)
- Keturah Moss Leitch Taylor, wife of Kentucky settlers David Leitch (1753–1794) and (after Leitch's death) James Taylor (1769–1848)
- Keturah (musician) Malawian signer-songwriter

== Places ==
- Diamond Keturah, U.S. Virgin Islands, settlement
- Keturah, kibbutz (settlement) in southern Israel

== Other ==
- Keturah and Lord Death, novel by Martine Leavitt
- Hotel Keturah, historic hotel in South Carolina

== See also ==
- Katura Marae (born 1989), Vanuatuan athlete
