= Lawrence L. Hester =

American politician

Lawrence Lamar Hester
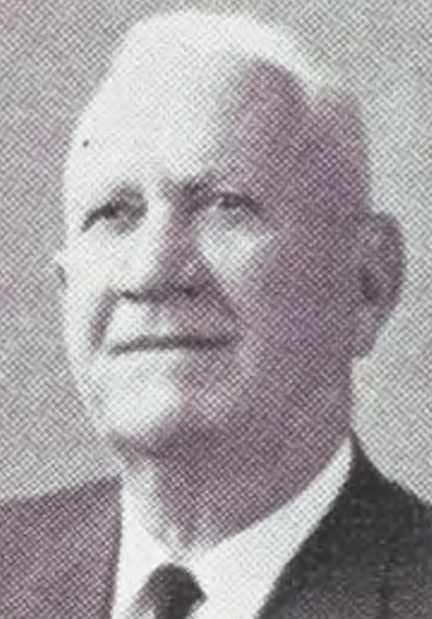
- Hester in 1970

Member of the South Carolina Senate from the 24th district
- In office 1941–1968

Member of the South Carolina House of Representatives from McCormick County
- In office 1969–1970

Personal details
- Born: Lawrence Lamar Hester; December 17, 1891 Mount Carmel, South Carolina, U.S.
- Died: February 26, 1973 (aged 81) Greenwood, South Carolina, U.S.
- Party: Democratic

Lawrence Lamar Hester (December 17, 1891 – February 26, 1973) was an American politician. A member of the Democratic Party, he served in the South Carolina Senate from 1941 to 1968 and in the South Carolina House of Representatives from 1969 to 1970.

== Life and career ==
Hester was born in Mount Carmel, South Carolina, the son of James and Adalina Hester. He attended Greenwood Graded School, graduating in 1908.

Hester served in the South Carolina Senate from 1941 to 1968. After his service in the Senate, he then served in the South Carolina House of Representatives from 1969 to 1970.

== Death ==
Hester died on February 26, 1973, at the Self Memorial Hospital in Greenwood, South Carolina, at the age of 81.
