= Sylvania (McCormick County, South Carolina) =

Historic house in South Carolina, United States

- U.S. National Register of Historic Places
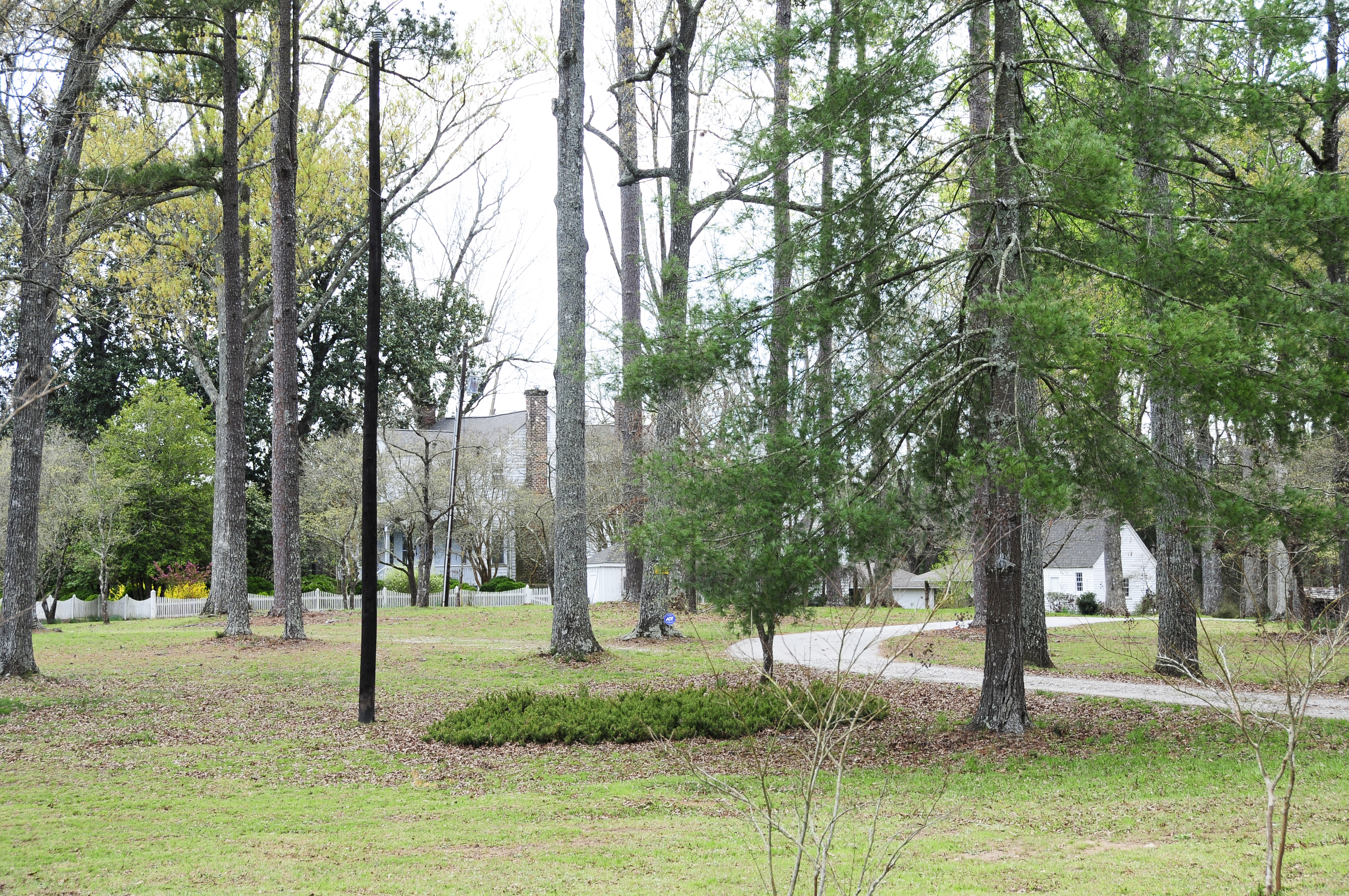
- Sylvania, March 2012

- Location within South Carolina Location within the United States
- Location: South of Bradley off South Carolina Highway 10, near Bradley, South Carolina
- Coordinates: 34°0′35″N 82°14′24″W
- Area: 12.8 acres (5.2 ha)
- Built: 1825
- NRHP reference No.: 77001533
- Added to NRHP: November 28, 1977

Sylvania in McCormick County, South Carolina, near Bradley, South Carolina, was built in 1825. It was listed on the National Register of Historic Places in 1977.

The house is thought to have been built in 1825 by John Hearst, the great-uncle of William Randolph Hearst. John Hearst died in 1847, and James H. Wideman acquired the property. Frank Wideman, Sr., owner of the property during the 20th Century, was appointed by Franklin D. Roosevelt as Assistant U.S. Attorney General in charge of the Justice Department Tax Division. Frank Wideman Jr., worked to restore the house between 1969 and 1971. It is a one-and-one-half story white clapboard building in the Federal style set on a low brick foundation and has fine Regency details in the interior and faux finishes. Current owners Jay and Kim Dowd III purchased Sylvania from the Wideman Family in 2020 after five generations of family ownership with a commitment to preservation and stewardship of this SC historical landmark.
