= Hamilton Branch State Park =

State park in South Carolina, United States

Hamilton Branch State Recreation Area
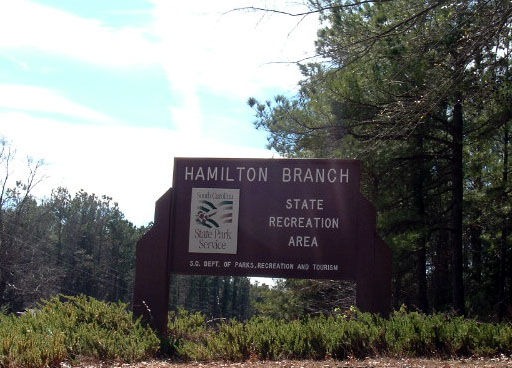
- Interactive map of Hamilton Branch State Recreation Area
- Nearest city: Plum Branch, SC
- Coordinates: 33°45′14.68″N 82°12′8.94″W
- Area: 731 acres (3 km^{2})
- Created: 1972
- Camp sites: tent, RV, primitive group
- Hiking trails: yes

Hamilton Branch State Park is located near the town of Plum Branch in McCormick County. It sits on a 731-acre peninsula in Lake Strom Thurmond. The park became part of the South Carolina State Park Service in 1972, with land leased from the United States Army Corps of Engineers.

Amenities in the park include lakefront camping sites, picnic shelters, a playground and two boat ramps for access to the lake. The park office sells limited supplies and souvenirs and also rents out a number of games for guests. A short bike trail provides access to the Steven's Creek Bike Trail. The park is a popular spot for geocaching, fishing and bird watching.
