= Mount Carmel Historic District =

Historic district in South Carolina, United States

- U.S. National Register of Historic Places
- U.S. Historic district
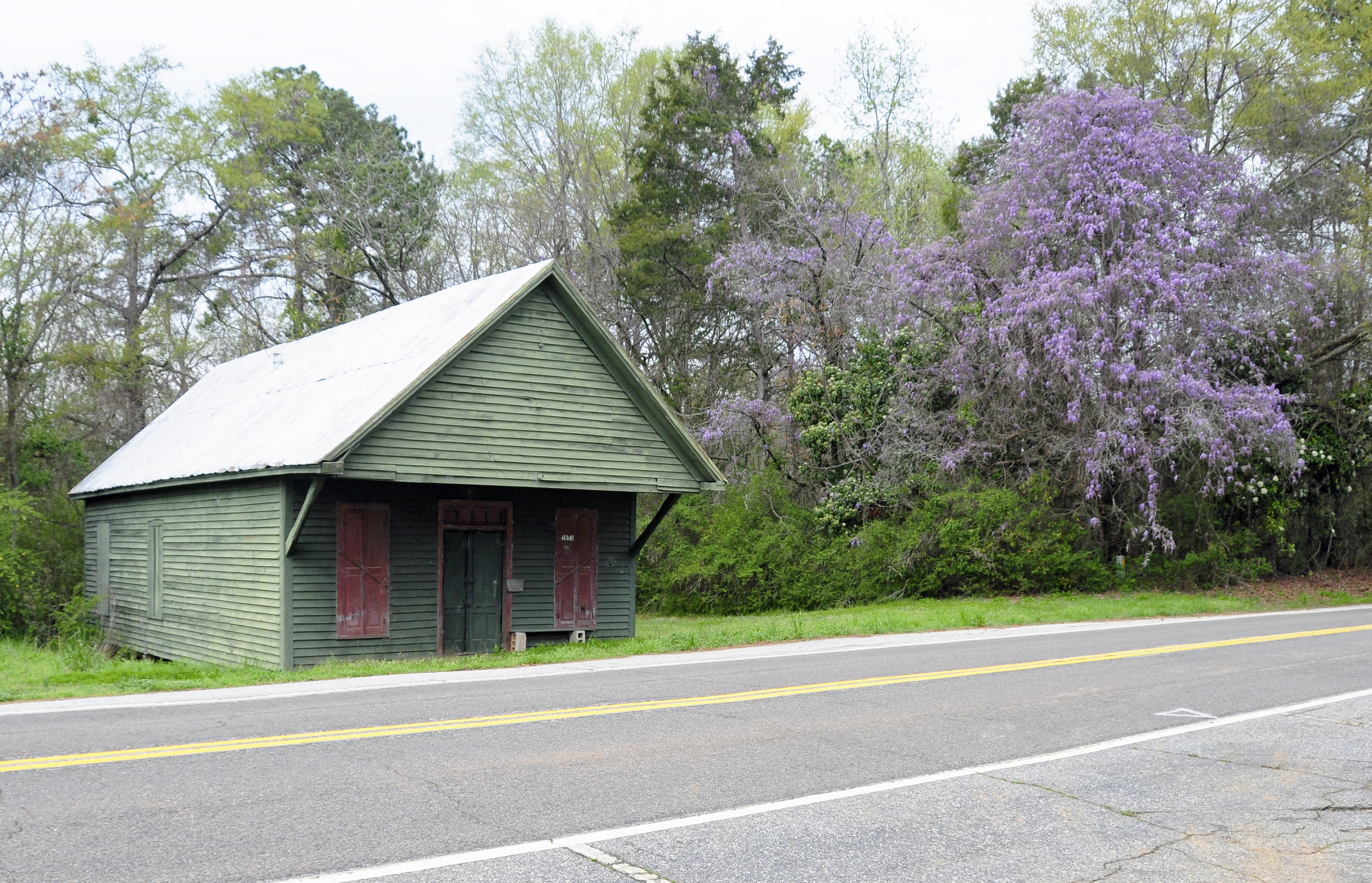
- Mount Carmel Historic District, March 2012

- Location within South Carolina Location within the United States
- Location: SC 823 and SC 81, Mount Carmel, South Carolina
- Coordinates: 34°00′30″N 82°30′28″W
- Area: 85 acres (34 ha)
- Built: 1925
- NRHP reference No.: 82003895
- Added to NRHP: June 22, 1982

Mount Carmel Historic District is a national historic district located at Mount Carmel, McCormick County, South Carolina. The district encompasses 40 contributing buildings in Mount Carmel. They were built between 1885 and 1920, and include residential, commercial, institutional, religious, and industrial buildings. Notable buildings include Baker's Store (c. 1890), John Cade House (c. 1890), John W. Morrah House (1896), and the Mount Carmel Presbyterian Church (c. 1886).

It was listed on the National Register of Historic Places in 1982.
