= Guillebeau House =

Historic house in South Carolina, United States

- U.S. National Register of Historic Places
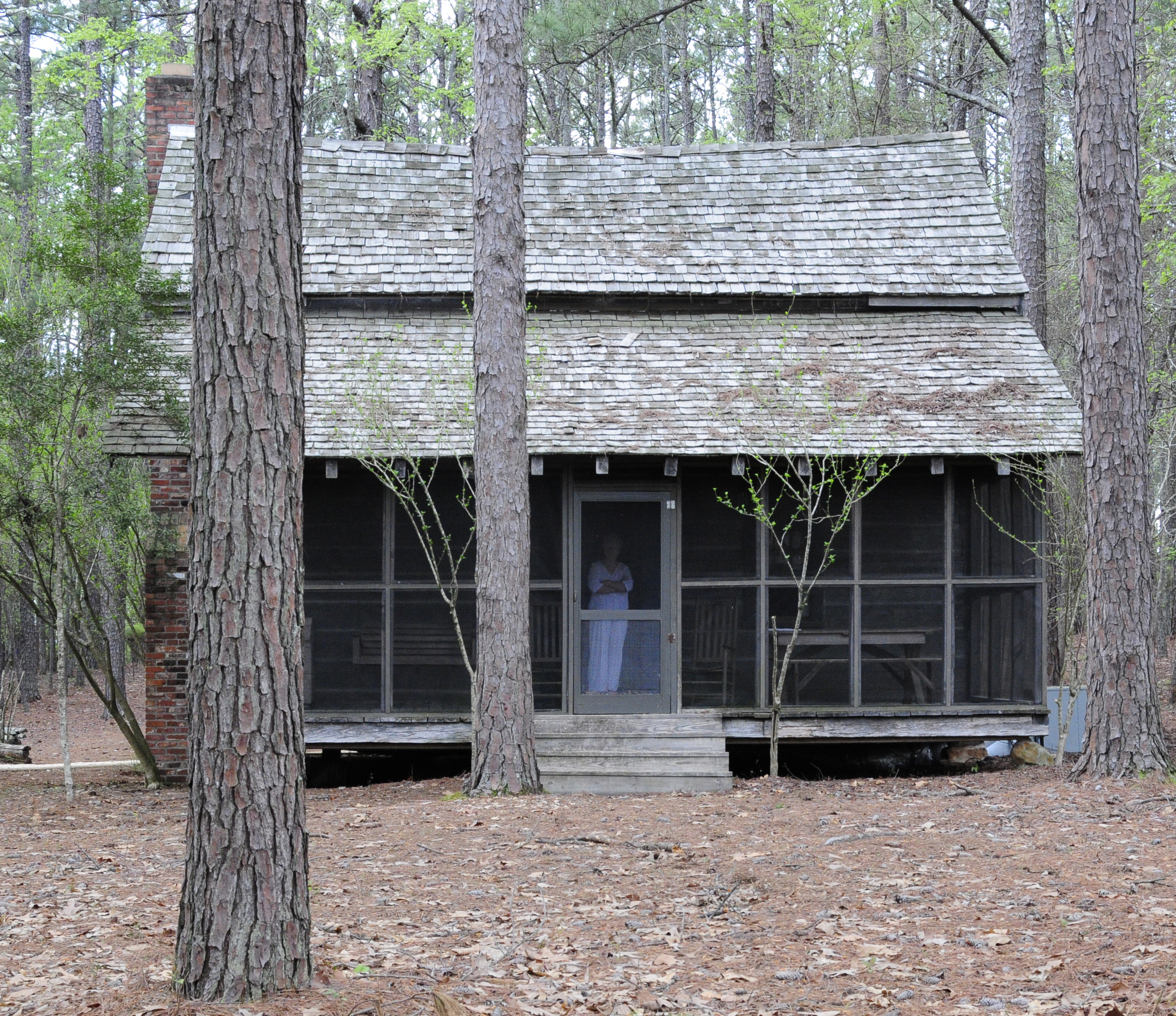
- Guillebeau House, March 2012

- Location within South Carolina Location within the United States
- Location: Hickory Knob State Park, Willington, South Carolina
- Coordinates: 33°56′47″N 82°26′36″W
- Area: 3 acres (1.2 ha)
- Built: c. 1764
- Architectural style: Log building
- NRHP reference No.: 73002136
- Added to NRHP: March 7, 1973

Guillebeau House is a historic home located in Hickory Knob State Resort Park near Willington in McCormick County, South Carolina. It was built in about 1764 and is a double-pen log house with one exterior chimney and two front entrances. It has a full-width, shed-roof porch.

Built by Andre Guillebeau (1739-1814) shortly after his arrival at the French Huguenot settlement known as New Bordeaux, the house was moved to Hickory Knob State Resort Park in about 1983. Included in the original NRHP listing was the contributing family cemetery.

It was listed on the National Register of Historic Places in 1973.
