= Joseph Jennings Dorn House =

Historic house in South Carolina, United States

- U.S. National Register of Historic Places
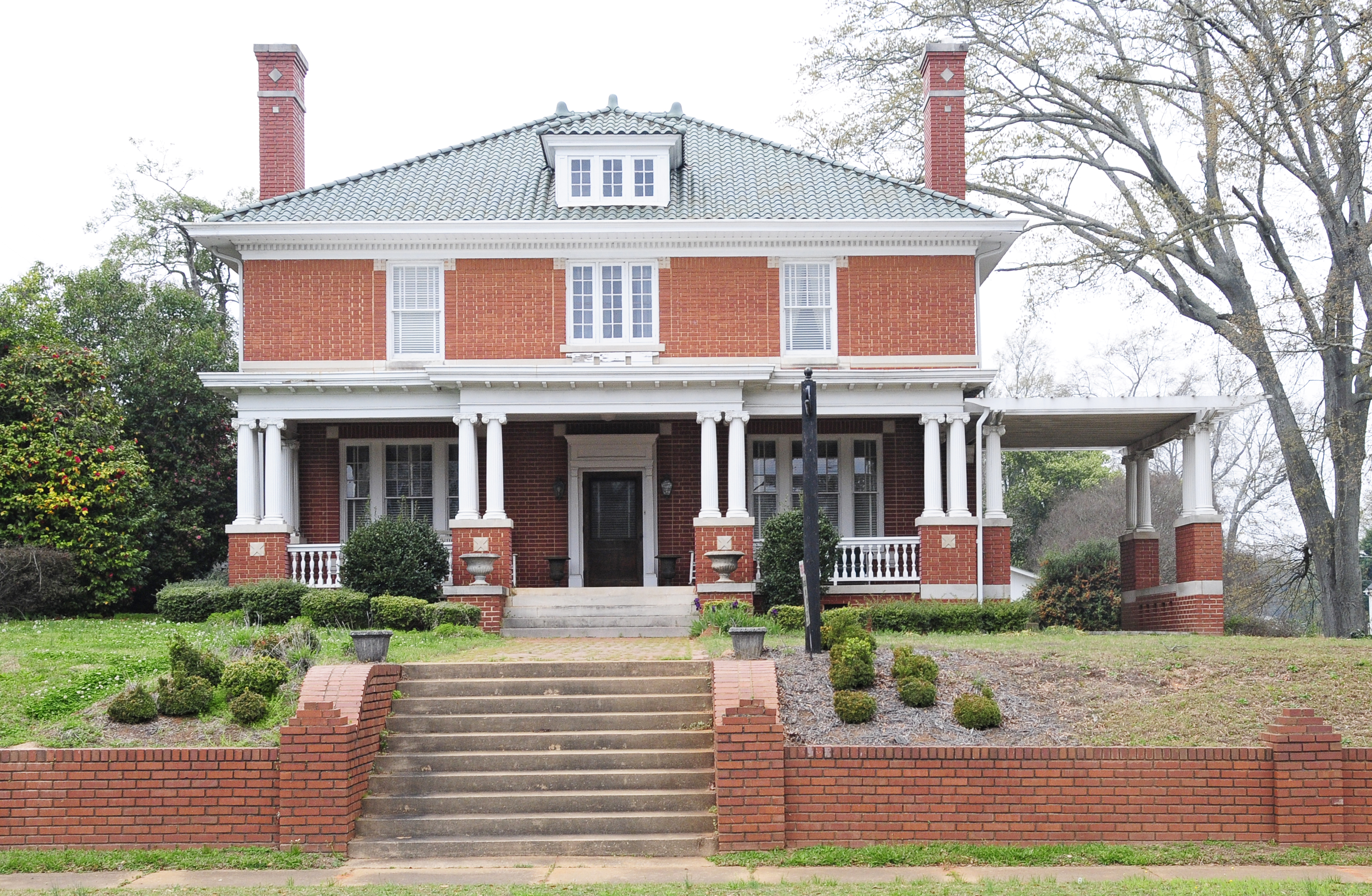
- Joseph Jennings Dorn House, March 2012

- Location within South Carolina Location within the United States
- Location: Gold and Oak Sts., McCormick, South Carolina
- Coordinates: 33°54′50″N 82°17′37″W
- Area: 0.7 acres (0.28 ha)
- Built: 1917
- Built by: Summer, J.E.; Hemphill, J.C.
- Architectural style: Colonial Revival
- MPS: McCormick MRA
- NRHP reference No.: 85003342
- Added to NRHP: December 12, 1985

Joseph Jennings Dorn House is a historic home located at McCormick in McCormick County, South Carolina. It was built about 1917, and is a two-story, brick Colonial Revival style dwelling. It features a one-story porch with paired Ionic order columns and an open Porte-cochère with extended roof brackets. The house was built by Joseph Jennings Dorn, a prominent businessman and politician.

It was listed on the National Register of Historic Places in 1985.
