= Dorn Gold Mine =

- U.S. National Register of Historic Places
- Location within South Carolina Location within the United States
- Nearest city: McCormick, South Carolina
- Area: 5.1 acres (2.1 ha)
- Built: 1852
- MPS: McCormick MRA
- NRHP reference No.: 85003341
- Added to NRHP: December 12, 1985

Dorn Gold Mine is a historic gold mine site located near McCormick in McCormick County, South Carolina. The mine was struck in 1852, and exhausted in the late 1850s. It was operated by William Dorn, who excavated nearly $1,000,000 in gold during this period. In 1869, the mine was sold to inventor Cyrus McCormick. In 1882, McCormick ended his futile search for gold and began selling his land which would become the town of McCormick.

It was listed on the National Register of Historic Places in 1985.
