= Calhoun Mill =

- U.S. National Register of Historic Places
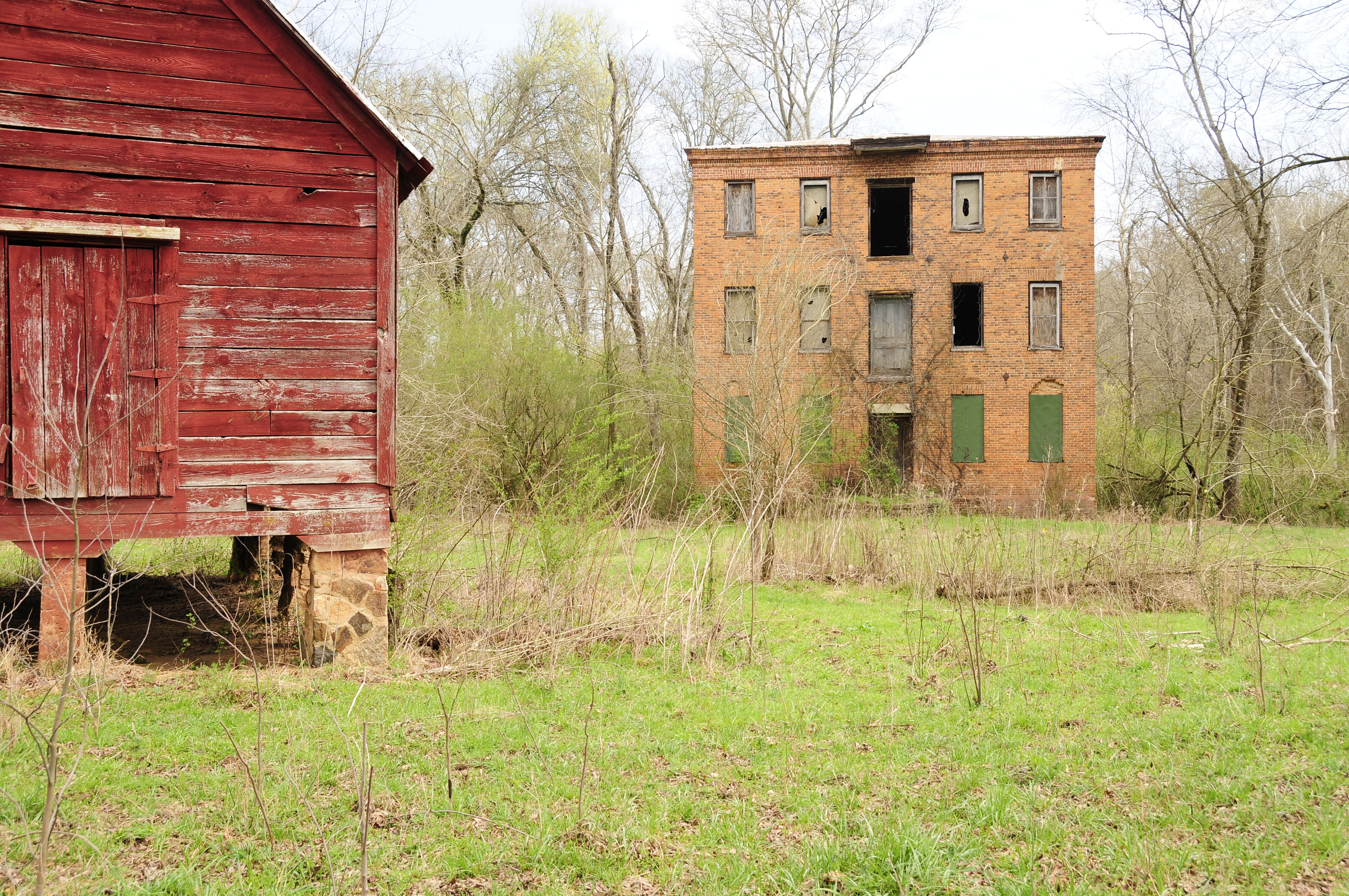
- Calhoun Mill, March 2012

- Location within South Carolina Location within the United States
- Location: Northeast of Mount Carmel, near Mount Carmel, South Carolina
- Coordinates: 34°02′03″N 82°28′29″W
- Area: 26.7 acres (10.8 ha)
- Built: c. 1860
- NRHP reference No.: 80003679
- Added to NRHP: November 24, 1980

Calhoun Mill, also known as Rogers Mill, is a historic grist mill located near Mount Carmel, McCormick County, South Carolina. It was built about 1860, and is a three-story, with basement, brick building. Also on the property are contributing sheds and a cotton gin, a race, and a mill dam. A mill operated on the site since the 1770s.

It was listed on the National Register of Historic Places in 1980.
