= Hickory Knob State Resort Park =

State park in South Carolina, United States

- A view of the Savannah River from the park
- Interactive map of Hickory Knob State Resort Park
- Nearest city: McCormick, SC
- Coordinates: 33°53′06″N 82°24′50″W
- Area: 1,091 acres (4 km^{2})
- Camp sites: tent and RV sites
- Hiking trails: 12-miles of trails

Hickory Knob State Resort Park is a state park located on the shores of Lake Strom Thurmond near the town of McCormick in McCormick County, South Carolina. It is the only resort park in the South Carolina State Park system.

== Activities and amenities ==
Activities available at the park include picnicking, fishing, boating, swimming, biking and camping.

Amenities include a playground, Wi-Fi access, basketball court, volleyball court, horseshoe pit, tether and ladder ball. A putting green area is available. Swimming in Lake Thurmond is allowed and a swimming pool is provided for those renting a cabin or room at the lodge. Archery and skeet shooting are available by reservation. Tennis courts are open to those staying at the park overnight. A full-service restaurant is located in the park.

A boat ramp on allows for lake access with docks available to overnight visitors. Canoes, kayaks, rods and reels are available for rent at the park office.

In addition to tent and RV camping, guests can stay overnight in rooms at the lodge or can rent one of the one or two bedroom cabins located at the park. A rustic group lodge, sleeping up to 13 people, is also available for rental.

An 18-hole championship golf course is located at the park.

Located at the park is the Guillebeau House, listed on the National Register of Historic Places in 1973. It was moved to Hickory Knob State Park about 1983.
