= Steven's Creek Heritage Preserve =

- Location within South Carolina
- Location: McCormick and Edgefield counties, South Carolina
- Nearest city: Clarks Hill
- Coordinates: 33°41′N 82°10′W
- Area: 434 acres (1.76 km^{2})
- Website: www.dnr.sc.gov/mlands/managedland?p_id=15

Steven's Creek Heritage Preserve is a nature preserve in the US State of South Carolina. It is managed by the South Carolina Department of Natural Resources. It covers 434 acres (1.76 km^{2}) in McCormick County and Edgefield County, and was established to protect rare animal and plant species. Webster's Salamander and Miccosukee gooseberry are among the species which have few populations outside the preserve. The nearest population center is Clarks Hill, about two road miles (3–4 km) to the southwest.

The site was identified in 1957 by Albert E. Radford of the University of North Carolina at Chapel Hill. He noticed exceptional diversity in the tree, shrub and herb layers on the bluffs overlooking Steven's Creek, and documented six plant species which had been unknown in South Carolina up to that time. Another five species were known from only one other South Carolina location. Many of these rare species were plentiful at the site, and remain prominent there today. A remarkable feature of this plant community is that a palmetto, Sabal minor, occurs near northern inland wildflowers such as Asarum canadense. Four trillium species are also present.

Soils of the bluffs were found to be atypical for South Carolina. Most of the state's soils are acidic with pH near or below 5. However, some topsoils in the preserve had pH readings near 7 -- neutral on the scale. This is more typical of base-rich sites in Appalachian coves and the Midwest, where many plants rare to South Carolina are abundant. These soils correspond most closely to the Cartecay and Toccoa series which are loam or sandy loam-textured Entisols. Along Steven's Creek are alluvial silt loam Inceptisols of the Riverview series. The majority of the preserve, away from the bluffs, is underlain by acidic sandy loam Ultisols of the Cataula, Hiwassee, Louisburg, and Pacolet series typical of the South Carolina Piedmont. These upland soils support mixed pine and hardwood forest over most of the preserve except in the southwest corner which has pure stands of pine.

== Related links ==
- Steven's Creek Heritage Preserve page
- Endangered Species Spotlight- Miccosukee Gooseberry
- Stevens Creek Heritage Preserve at NameThatPlant.net
