= Otway Henderson House =

Historic house in South Carolina, United States

- U.S. National Register of Historic Places
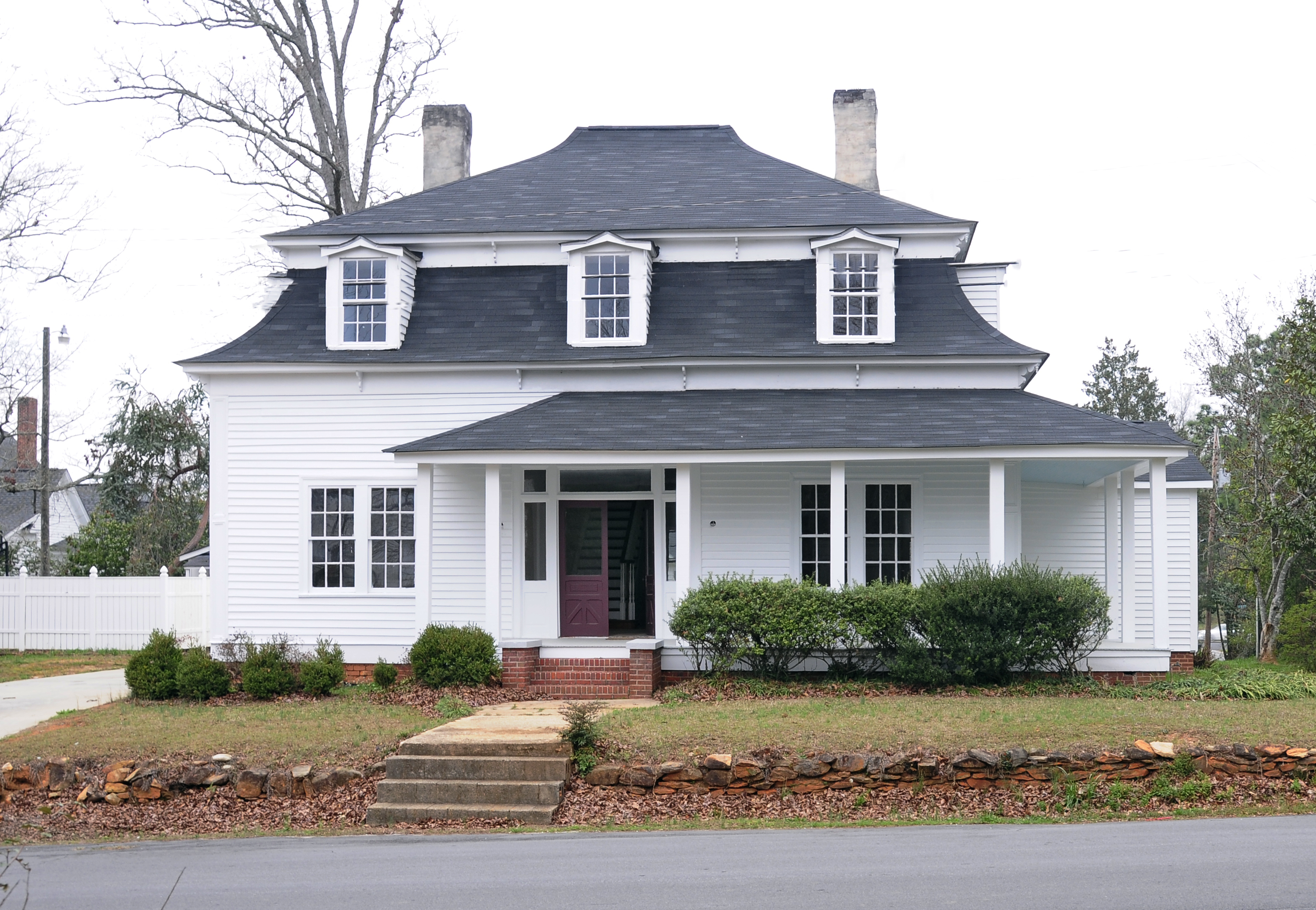
- Otway Henderson House, March 2012

- Location within South Carolina Location within the United States
- Location: Augusta St., McCormick, South Carolina
- Coordinates: 33°54′53″N 82°17′27″W
- Area: 0.2 acres (0.081 ha)
- Built: c. 1889; 137 years ago
- Architectural style: Second Empire
- MPS: McCormick MRA
- NRHP reference No.: 85003344
- Added to NRHP: December 12, 1985

Otway Henderson House is a historic home located at McCormick in McCormick County, South Carolina. It was built around 1889 and is a 1 1/2-story home. Its frame is Second Empire style. It features a dual-pitched mansard roof and a one-story porch with rectangular posts and railing. It was built by Otway Henderson, a prominent cotton farmer of the county.

It was listed on the National Register of Historic Places in 1985.
