= Calhoun-Gibert House =

Historic house in South Carolina, United States

- U.S. National Register of Historic Places
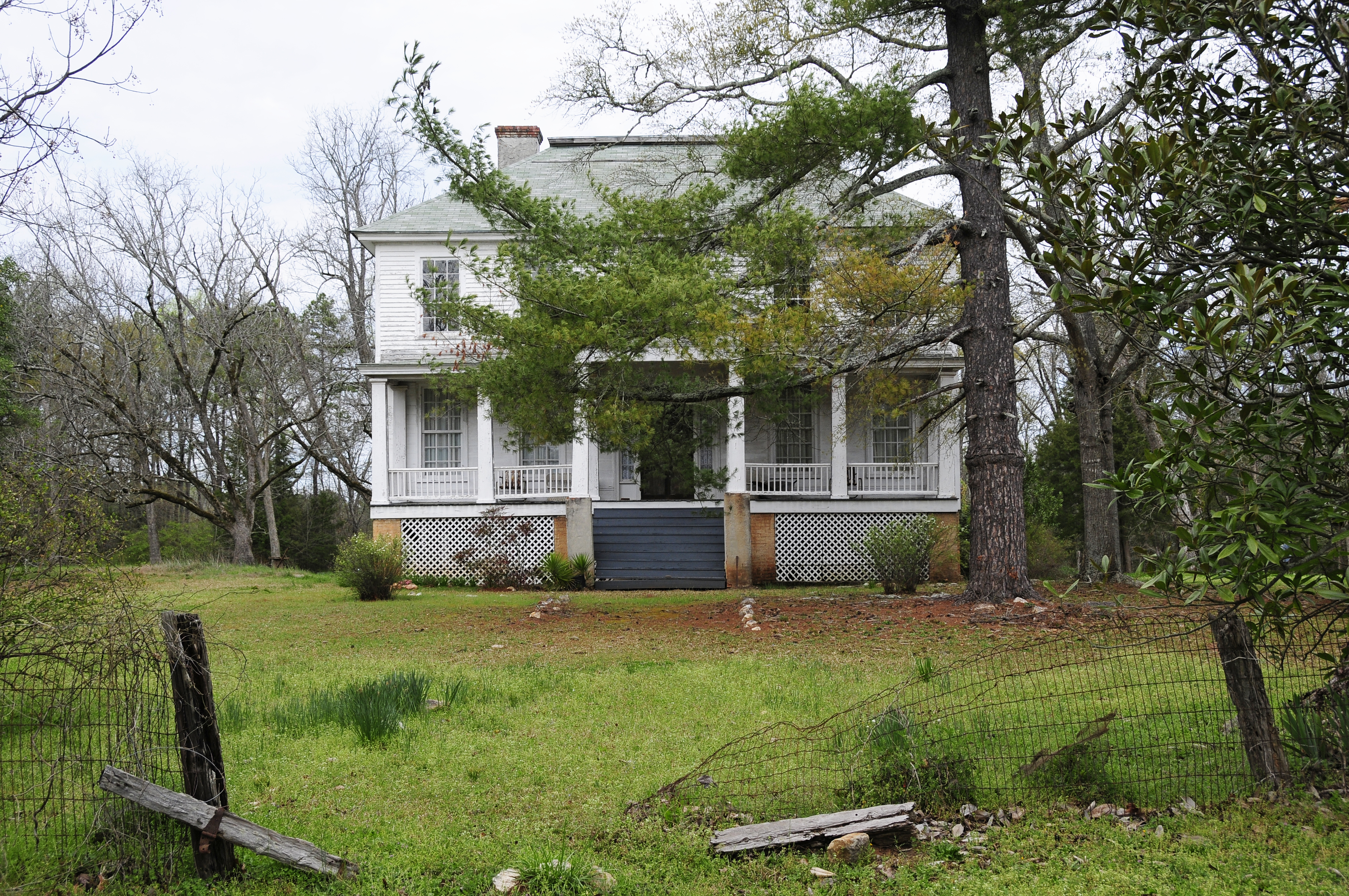
- Calhoun-Gilbert House, March 2012

- Location within South Carolina Location within the United States
- Location: SC Sec. Rd. 33-60, Willington, South Carolina
- Coordinates: 33°58′20″N 82°28′25″W
- Area: 8.2 acres (3.3 ha)
- Built: c. 1852, c. 1908
- Architect: William Jones
- Architectural style: Greek Revival, Classical Revival
- NRHP reference No.: 96000220
- Added to NRHP: March 12, 1996

Calhoun-Gibert House is a historic home located at Willington in McCormick County, South Carolina. It was built about 1856 and was originally a one-story Greek Revival style dwelling.

About 1908, the home was enlarged to two stories, and it was modified to incorporate Classical Revival design elements. It features a full-width, one-story hipped roof porch and a projecting pedimented portico. Also on the property are a contributing frame garage, a two-story frame cattle barn, a board-and-batten smoke house, a hay barn, and a potato barn.

The house is associated with the Calhoun family, a family of McCormick County planters and businessmen.

It was listed on the National Register of Historic Places in 1996.
