= M. L. B. Sturkey House =

Historic house in South Carolina, United States

- U.S. National Register of Historic Places
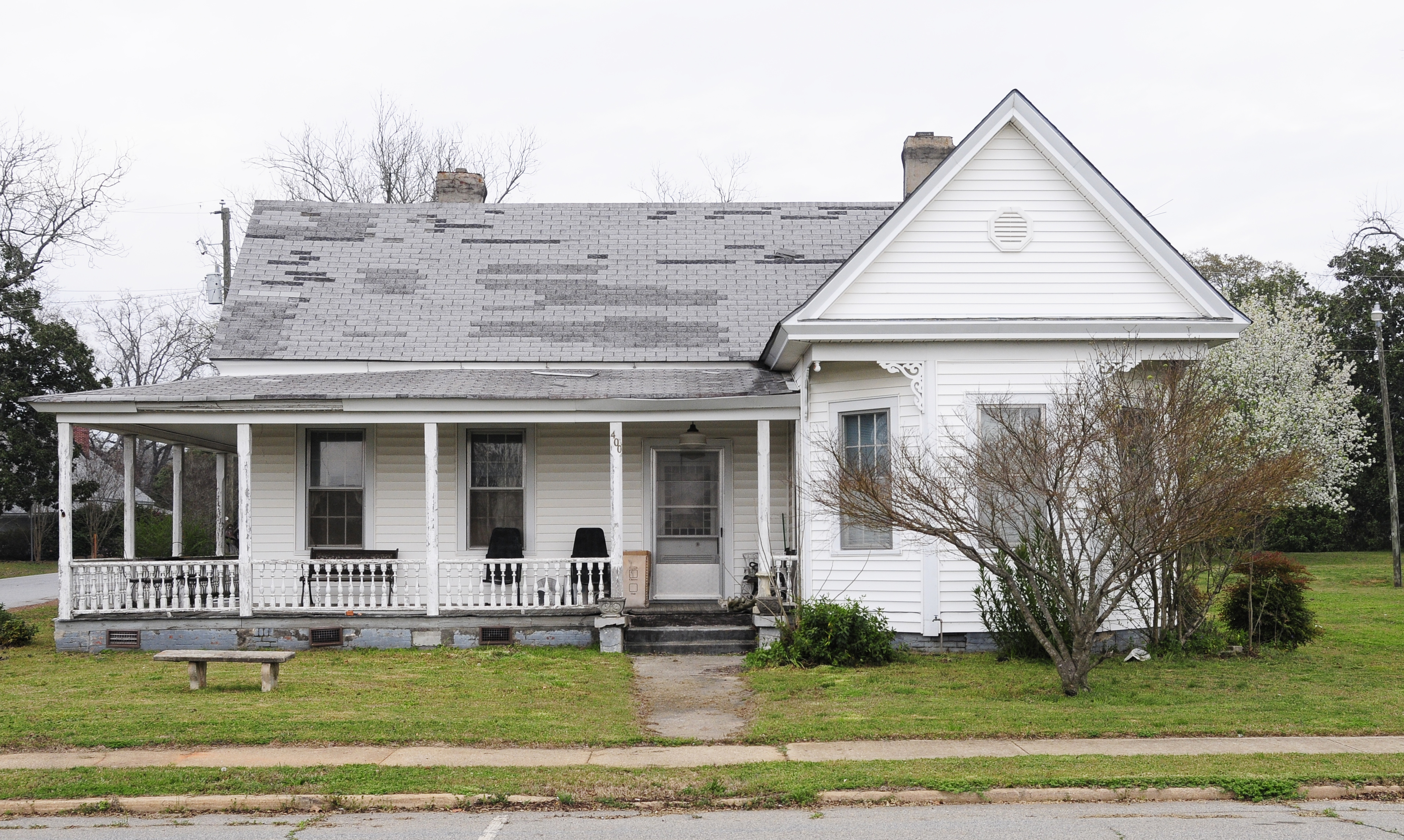
- M. L. B. Sturkey House, March 2012

- Location within South Carolina Location within the United States
- Location: Main and Washington Sts., McCormick, South Carolina
- Coordinates: 33°54′38″N 82°17′28″W
- Area: 0.3 acres (0.12 ha)
- Built: c. 1895
- Architectural style: Queen Anne
- MPS: McCormick MRA
- NRHP reference No.: 85003348
- Added to NRHP: December 12, 1985

M. L. B. Sturkey House is a historic home located at McCormick in McCormick County, South Carolina. It was built about 1895, and is a one-story, frame cottage with Queen Anne style detailing. It consists of gable front main section, with a wing and a rear addition. It was built by M. L. B. Sturkey, one of McCormick's most prominent early residents and leader in the formation of McCormick County.

It was listed on the National Register of Historic Places in 1985.
