= Dorn's Flour and Grist Mill =

- U.S. National Register of Historic Places
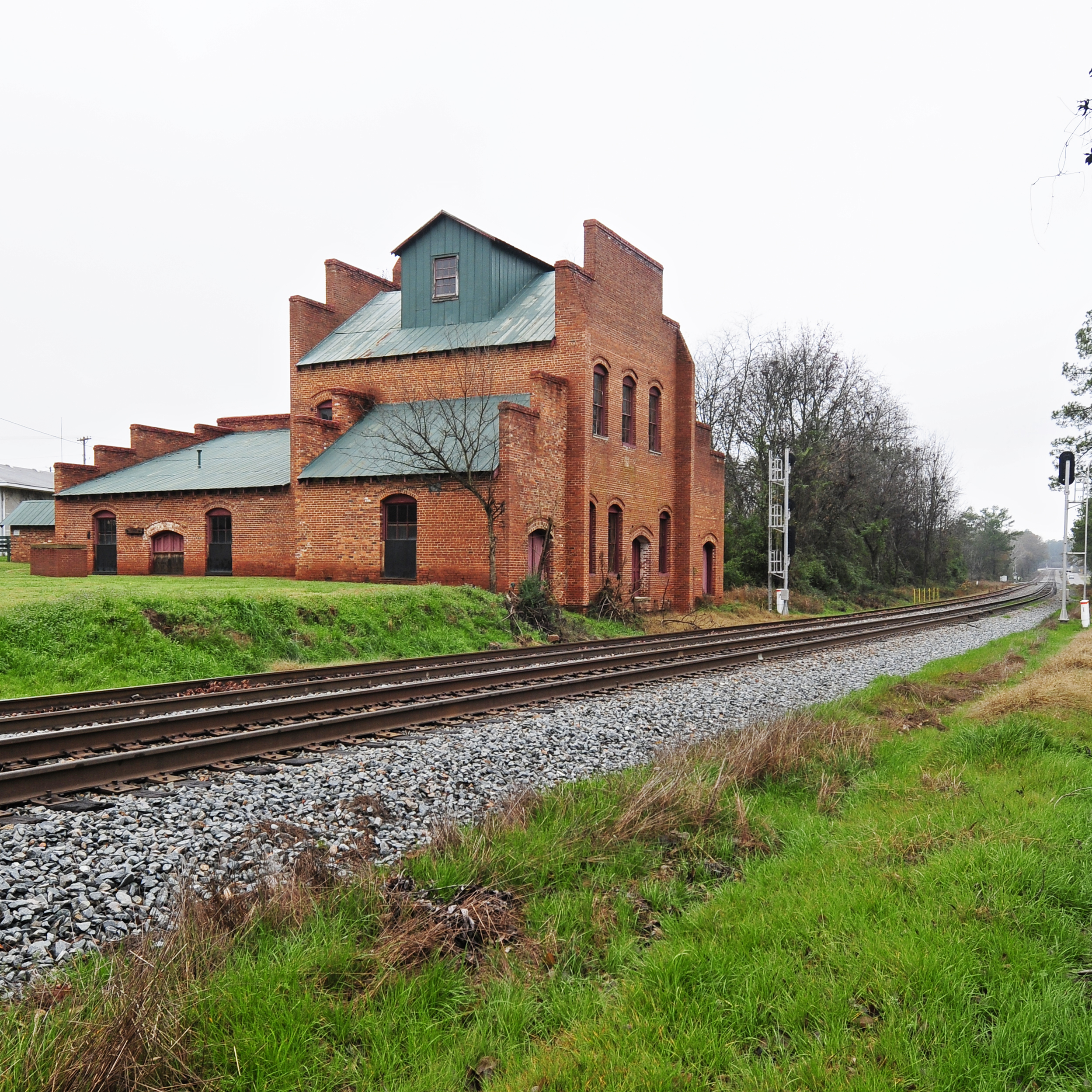
- Dorn's Mill, December 2011

- Location within South Carolina Location within the United States
- Location: SC 28, McCormick, South Carolina
- Coordinates: 33°54′48″N 82°17′48″W
- Area: less than one acre
- Built: c. 1898, 1915
- NRHP reference No.: 76002158
- Added to NRHP: July 12, 1976

Dorn's Flour and Grist Mill is a historic grist mill located at McCormick in McCormick County, South Carolina. It was built circa 1898 and is a 2 1/2- story, red brick structure with projecting one-story wings. A three-story brick wall of cross-shaped plan was built in 1915 to support a water tower tank. The mill originally housed a cotton gin. In the 1920s, grist mill equipment was added. The mill closed in the 1940s.

It was listed on the National Register of Historic Places in 1976.
