= McCormick station =

- McCormick Train Station
- U.S. National Register of Historic Places
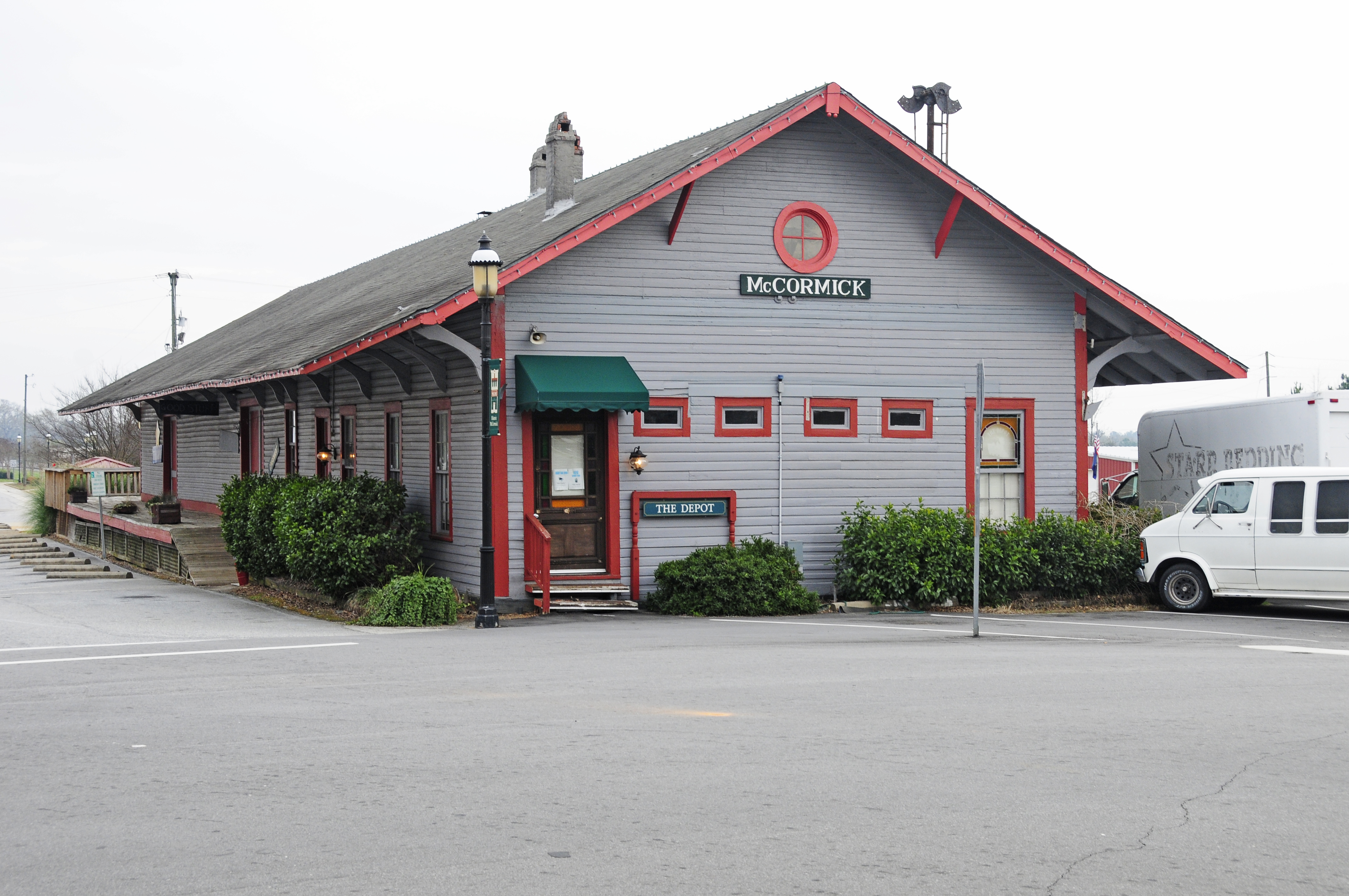
- McCormick Train Station, March 2012

- Location within South Carolina Location within the United States
- Location: 201 S. Main St., McCormick, South Carolina
- Coordinates: 33°54′42″N 82°17′36″W
- Area: 0.1 acres (0.040 ha)
- Built: c. 1911
- MPS: McCormick MRA
- NRHP reference No.: 85003347
- Added to NRHP: December 12, 1985

McCormick station, also known as the Charleston & Western Carolina Railway Depot, is a historic train station located at McCormick in McCormick County, South Carolina. It was built about 1911 by the Charleston and Western Carolina Railway. It is a one-story, rectangular frame building with a gable roof, wide eaves supported by brackets, and shiplap siding.

It was listed on the National Register of Historic Places in 1985.

Preceding station	Atlantic Coast Line Railroad	Following station
Troy toward Spartanburg	Charleston and Western Carolina Railway Main Line	Plum Branch toward Port Royal
Bordeaux toward Anderson	Charleston and Western Carolina Railway Anderson – McCormick	Terminus
