= John Albert Gibert M.D. House =

Historic house in South Carolina, United States

- U.S. National Register of Historic Places
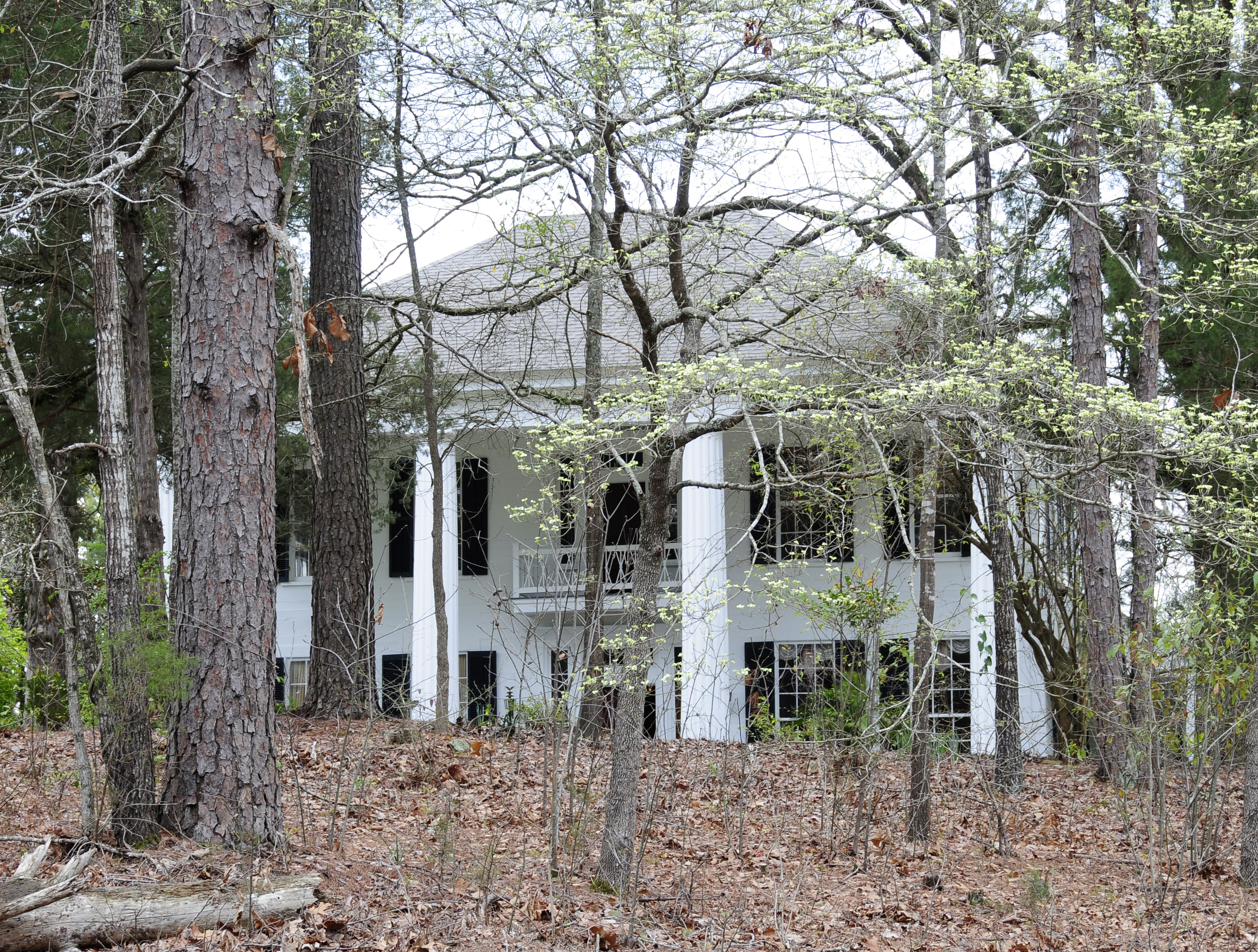
- John Albert Gilbert House, March 2012

- Location within South Carolina Location within the United States
- Location: Secondary Road 7, 0.2 miles south of its junction with Secondary Road 110, near McCormick, South Carolina
- Coordinates: 33°55′33″N 82°25′9″W
- Area: 8.7 acres (3.5 ha)
- Built: c. 1867, c. 1900
- Architectural style: Greek Revival, Vernacular, I-House
- NRHP reference No.: 93000441
- Added to NRHP: May 27, 1993

John Albert Gibert M.D. House is a historic home located near McCormick in McCormick County, South Carolina. It was built about 1867, and is a two-story, frame, I-house embellished with Greek Revival style decorative elements. It features a full-height portico supported by massive Doric order masonry columns. Also on the property is a one-story frame outbuilding (c. 1900), originally a single dwelling, but which later served as a general store.

It was listed on the National Register of Historic Places in 1993.
