= Price's Mill =

- U.S. National Register of Historic Places
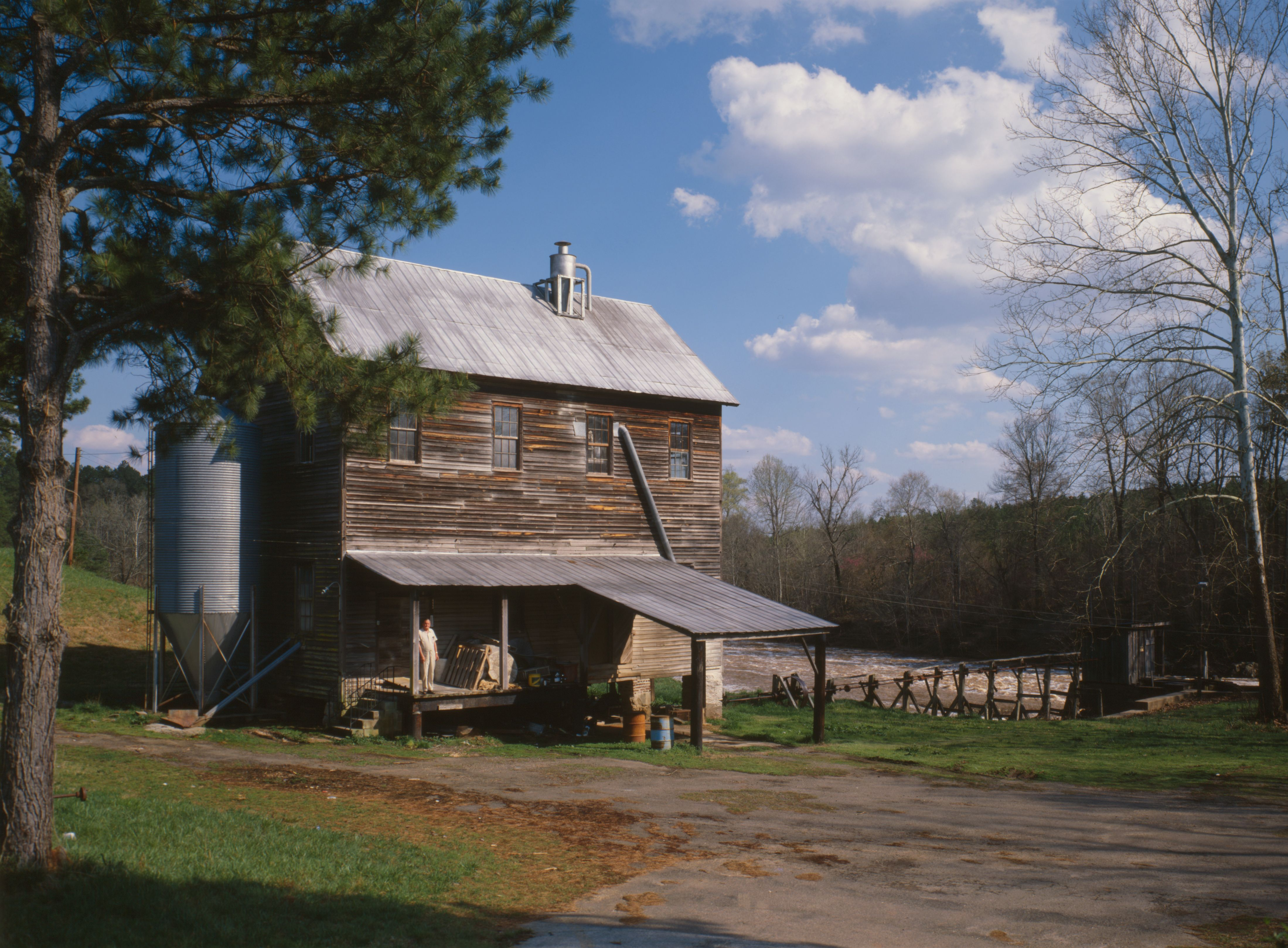
- Price's Mill in 1987

- Location within South Carolina Location within the United States
- Location: E of Parksville on SC 33-138 at Steven's Creek, Parksville, South Carolina
- Coordinates: 33°47′37″N 82°11′44″W
- Built: ca. 1890
- NRHP reference No.: 72001465
- Added to NRHP: November 22, 1972

Price's Mill, also known as Calliham's (Callaham's) Mill, Stone's Mill, and Park's Mill, is a water-powered gristmill about 2 mi (3 km) east of the town of Parksville on South Carolina Highway 33-138 (Price's Mill Road) at Stevens Creek in McCormick County. Its name in the USGS Geographic Names Information System is Prices Mill. It was built in the 1890s and was named to the National Register of Historic Places on November 22, 1972. At this time, it was one of the few remaining water-powered gristmills in South Carolina.

== History ==
David Calliham, who was son of Nicholas Callaham and was born in Virginia, acquired land on Stevens Creek in Ninety-Six District, South Carolina, around 1768. He established a gristmill on the creek. He died prior to 1784.

In addition to the gristmill, a cotton gin and a flour mill have operated nearby. These have been destroyed by floods.

The current mill building was constructed in the 1890s. Starting in 1910, R. A. Price operated the mill. He worked up to seven days per week and produced as much as 14,000 lb (6,400 kg) of cornmeal each week. In his early work, he took a toll of the meal ground for farmers. He died in 1968. His son, John M. Price, took over the mill. By this time toll milling ceased and the mill purchased corn to grind meal. He produced around 7,000 lb (3,200 kg) of white or yellow cornmeal in the early 1970s by operating three days a week. He marketed the cornmeal under the mill's own label in McCormick and Greenwood County retail stores. In this period, he had an employee.

According to a 2003 travel guide, the mill is no longer operated.

== Architecture ==
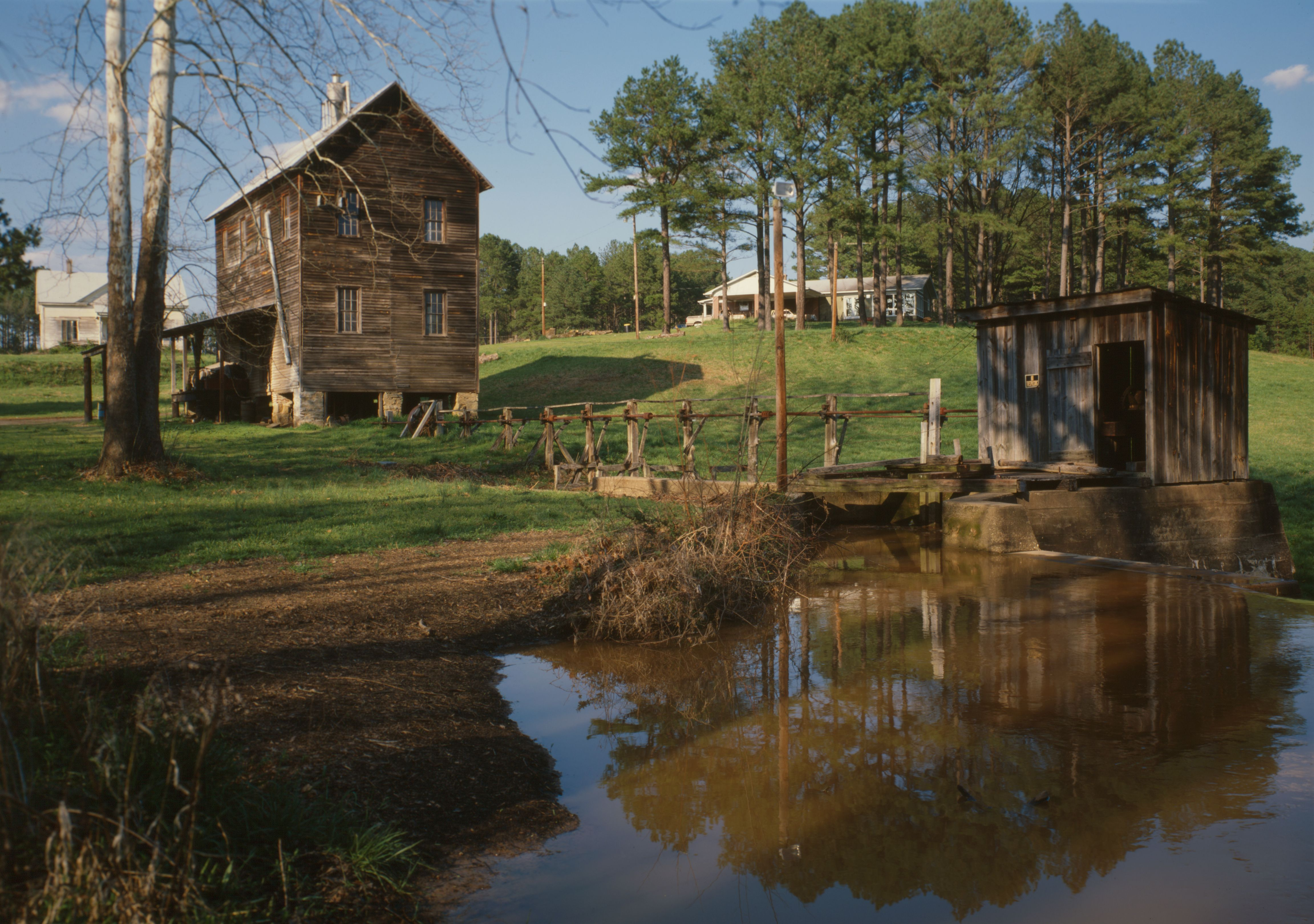
Power transmission from the penstock to the mill

The mill is a two-story, frame building with a gable roof. It is constructed of rough-hewn pine. It has 12 in (30 cm) by 12 in (30 cm) exposed beams that are mortised and doweled. The building's foundation is brick piers. A steel cyclone air cleaner can be seen on its roof in photographs.

The burr-type mill stones are 42 in (107 cm) in diameter. They are enclosed in a wooden housing. The upper or runner stone has a round hole. The lower bedstone has a square hole. Grain enters through a funnel and exits into a bin. The stones can be raised or lowered to adjust the texture of the product.

A rock and mortar dam, which was built in the early 19th century, was used at the mill to impound Steven's Creek. This dam was replaced in 1913 by a 13 ft (4 m) tall concrete dam. Power is produced by a steel turbine and is delivered by a 50 ft (15 m) long shaft to a wooden cartwheel gear below the mill building.
