= Farmer's Bank =

- U.S. National Register of Historic Places
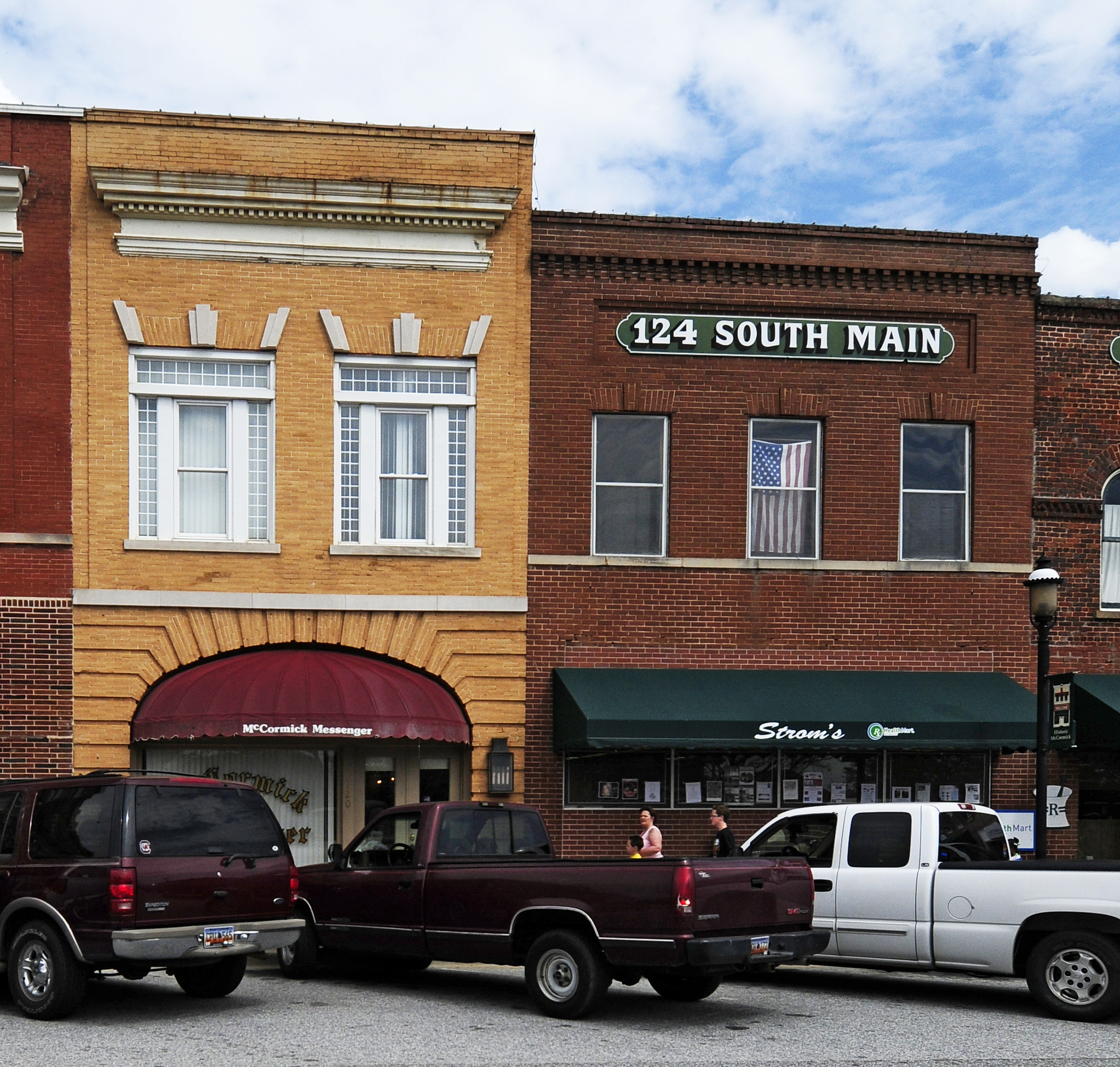
- Farmer's Bank, March 2012

- Location within South Carolina Location within the United States
- Location: Main St., McCormick, South Carolina
- Coordinates: 33°54′45″N 82°17′37″W
- Area: 0.3 acres (0.12 ha)
- Built: c. 1911
- Architectural style: Classical Revival
- MPS: McCormick MRA
- NRHP reference No.: 85003343
- Added to NRHP: December 12, 1985

Farmer's Bank, also known as the McCormick Messenger Building, is a historic bank building located at McCormick in McCormick County, South Carolina. It was built about 1911, and is a two-story frame and brick building with Classical Revival design elements. The first floor storefront is encompassed by a large rounded arch with radiating voussoirs and quoins.

It was listed on the National Register of Historic Places in 1985.
