= Albert Ernest Radford =

American botanist (1918–2006)

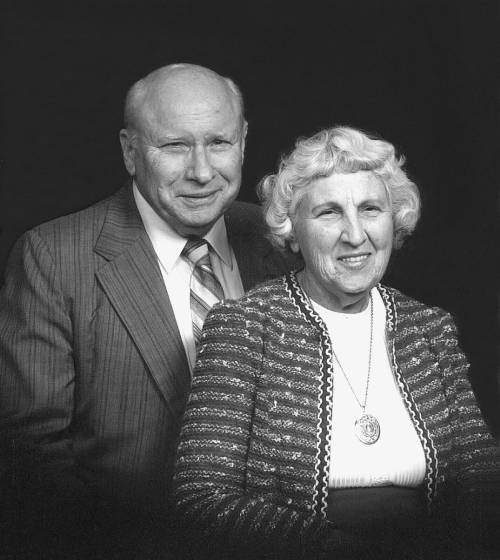
- Professor and Mrs. Radford in 1988
- Born: January 25, 1918; Augusta, Georgia, U.S.
- Died: April 12, 2006 (aged 88); Columbia, Missouri
- Education: Furman University
- Known for: Plant taxonomy, ecology
- Scientific career
- Fields: Botany
- Workplaces: University of North Carolina
- Doctoral advisor: Henry Roland Totten
- Author abbrev. (botany): Radford

Albert Ernest Radford (January 25, 1918 – April 12, 2006) was an American botanist active in the Southeastern United States. He was best known for his work as senior author of Manual of the Vascular Flora of the Carolinas, the definitive flora for North Carolina and South Carolina.

== Biography ==
Radford was born in Augusta, Georgia to Albert and Eloise Moseley Radford, one of nine children. He was educated at Junior College of Augusta, Furman University (B.S., 1939) and the University of North Carolina at Chapel Hill (Ph.D., 1948). He served in the 51st Engineer Combat Battalion of the United States Army during World War II and saw action in North Africa and Europe, including the Battle of the Bulge, for which his battalion was awarded the Croix de Guerre.

He and his wife (married 1941), Laurie Stewart Radford (1910–2004), had three children, David, John, and Linda. Albert was Professor of Botany at the University of North Carolina at Chapel Hill for forty years and director of the University of North Carolina Herbarium for 23 years.

Professionally, he served as President of the Elisha Mitchell Scientific Society and of the Southern Appalachian Botanical Club. Besides his academic work in botany, he was active in conservation of natural areas in the Southeastern United States. One of his most significant accomplishments was the discovery of an unusual plant community which has since become protected as Steven's Creek Heritage Preserve. Among his students was ethnobotanist James A. Duke. His grandson Phil Radford, served as the youngest executive director of Greenpeace, from 2009 to 2014.

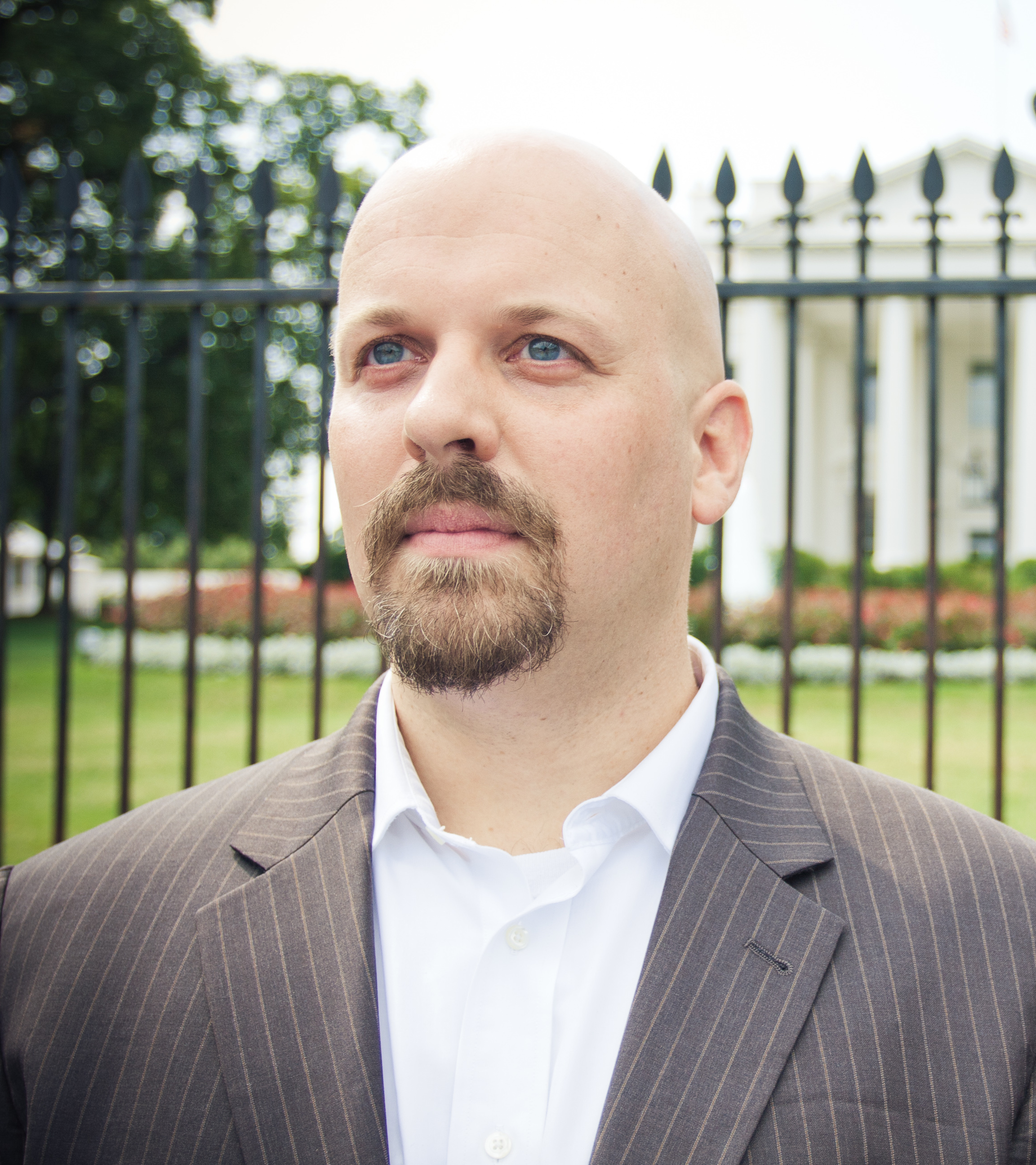
Phil Radford.

== Works ==
- Radford, Albert; Ahles, H.E.; Bell, C. R. (1968). Manual of the Vascular Flora of the Carolinas. Chapel Hill, North Carolina: University of North Carolina Press. ISBN 0-8078-1087-8.
- Radford, Albert (1974). Vascular Plant Systematics. New York: Harper and Row.
- Radford, Albert (1981). Natural Heritage: Classification, Inventory, and Information. Chapel Hill, North Carolina: University of North Carolina Press. ISBN 0-8078-1463-6.
- Radford, Albert (1986). Fundamentals of Plant Systematics. New York: Harper & Row. ISBN 0-06-350594-0.
- Radford, Albert; Radford, Laurie S. Radford (2002). John S. Radford (ed.). Unbroken Line: the 51st Engineer Combat Battalion from Normandy to Munich. Woodside, California: CrossMountain Publishing. ISBN 0-9717638-0-1.
