= McCormick County Courthouse =

- U.S. National Register of Historic Places
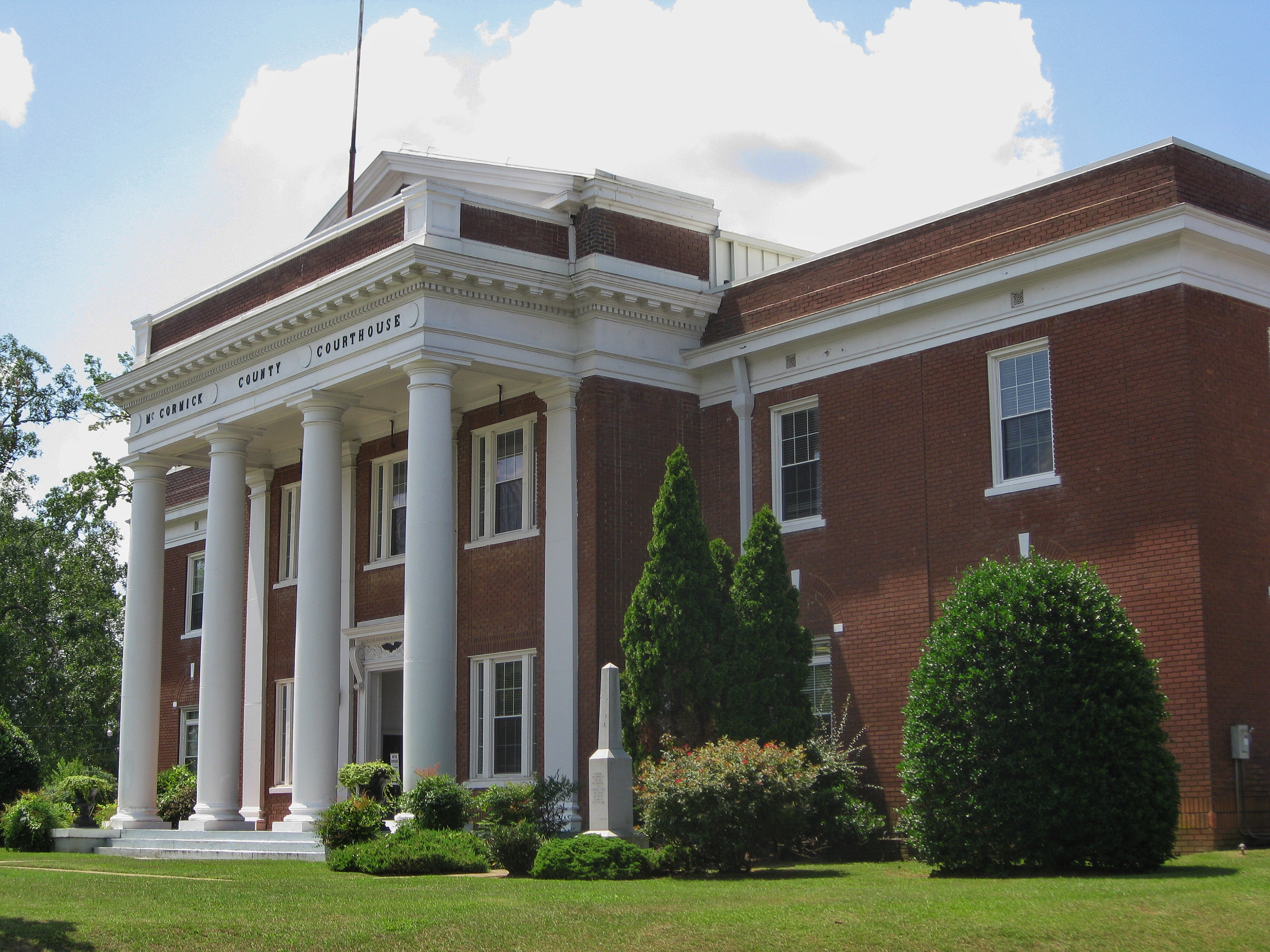
- McCormick County Courthouse, June 2018

- Location within South Carolina Location within the United States
- Location: 133 South Mine St., McCormick, South Carolina
- Coordinates: 33.9106°N 82.2946°W
- Area: 0.5 acres (0.20 ha)
- Built: 1923
- Architect: C. Lloyd Preacher
- Architectural style: Classical Revival
- MPS: McCormick MRA
- NRHP reference No.: 85003346
- Added to NRHP: December 12, 1985

McCormick County Courthouse is a historic courthouse building located at McCormick in McCormick County, South Carolina. It was designed by architect G. Lloyd Preacher and built in 1923. It is a two-story, Classical Revival style brick building. It features a large two-story portico with Doric order columns and pilasters.

It was listed on the National Register of Historic Places in 1985.
