= Willington, South Carolina =

- CDP
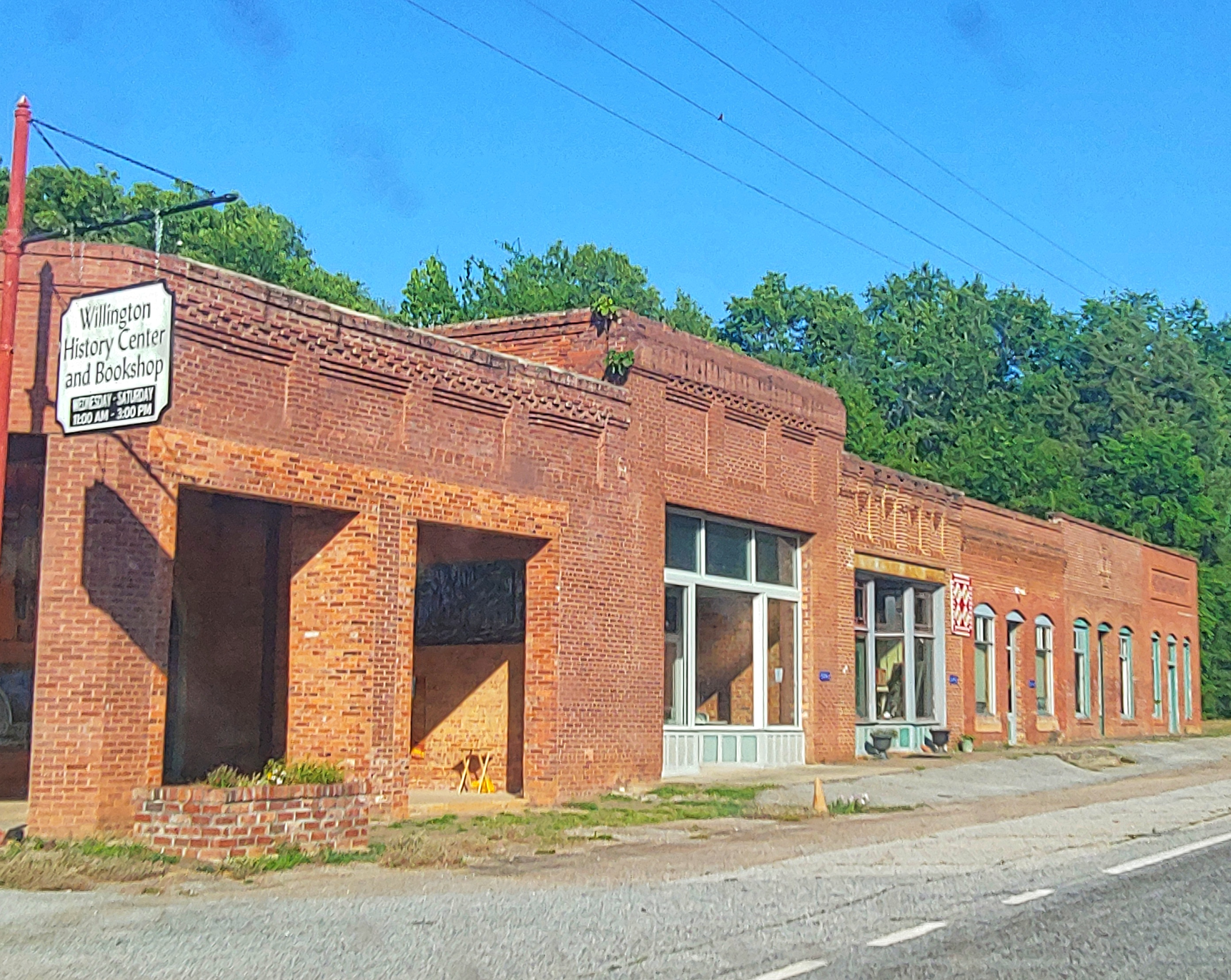
- Willington History Center

- Location in McCormick County and the state of South Carolina.
- Coordinates: 33°58′07″N 82°27′27″W
- Country: United States
- State: South Carolina
- County: McCormick

Area
  - Total: 6.00 sq mi (15.53 km^{2})
  - Land: 5.95 sq mi (15.42 km^{2})
  - Water: 0.042 sq mi (0.11 km^{2})
- Elevation: 436 ft (133 m)

Population (2020)
  - Total: 81
  - Density: 13.6/sq mi (5.25/km^{2})
- Time zone: UTC-5 (Eastern (EST))
  - Summer (DST): UTC-4 (EDT)
- ZIP code: 29835
- Area codes: 864, 821
- FIPS code: 45-77920
- GNIS feature ID: 2403030

Willington is a census-designated place (CDP) in McCormick County, South Carolina, United States. The population was 177 at the 2000 census.

== History ==
The Calhoun-Gibert House and Guillebeau House are listed on the National Register of Historic Places.

== Geography ==
According to the United States Census Bureau, the CDP has a total area of 6.0 square miles (16 km^{2}), of which 6.0 square miles (16 km^{2}) is land and 0.04 square miles (0.10 km^{2}) (0.67%) is water.

== Demographics ==
Historical population
Census	Pop.	Note	%±
2000	177		—
2010	142		−19.8%
2020	81		−43.0%
U.S. Decennial Census

=== 2020 census ===
Willington CDP, South Carolina – Racial and ethnic composition Note: the US Census treats Hispanic/Latino as an ethnic category. This table excludes Latinos from the racial categories and assigns them to a separate category. Hispanics/Latinos may be of any race.
Race / Ethnicity (NH = Non-Hispanic)	Pop 2000	Pop 2010	Pop 2020	% 2000	% 2010	% 2020
White alone (NH)	27	20	13	15.25%	14.08%	16.05%
Black or African American alone (NH)	146	122	61	82.49%	85.92%	75.31%
Native American or Alaska Native alone (NH)	0	0	0	0.00%	0.00%	0.00%
Asian alone (NH)	4	0	0	2.26%	0.00%	0.00%
Native Hawaiian or Pacific Islander alone (NH)	0	0	0	0.00%	0.00%	0.00%
Other race alone (NH)	0	0	1	0.00%	0.00%	1.23%
Mixed race or Multiracial (NH)	0	0	1	0.00%	0.00%	1.23%
Hispanic or Latino (any race)	0	0	5	0.00%	0.00%	6.17%
Total	177	142	81	100.00%	100.00%	100.00%

=== 2000 census ===
As of the census of 2000, there were 177 people, 68 households, and 43 families living in the CDP. The population density was 29.6 inhabitants per square mile (11.4/km^{2}). There were 80 housing units at an average density of 13.4/sq mi (5.2/km^{2}). The racial makeup of the CDP was 15.25% White, 82.49% African American and 2.26% Asian.

There were 68 households, out of which 25.0% had children under the age of 18 living with them, 41.2% were married couples living together, 22.1% had a female householder with no husband present, and 35.3% were non-families. 33.8% of all households were made up of individuals, and 14.7% had someone living alone who was 65 years of age or older. The average household size was 2.60 and the average family size was 3.41.

In the CDP, the population was spread out, with 25.4% under the age of 18, 10.7% from 18 to 24, 25.4% from 25 to 44, 24.3% from 45 to 64, and 14.1% who were 65 years of age or older. The median age was 38 years. For every 100 females, there were 96.7 males. For every 100 females age 18 and over, there were 100.0 males.

The median income for a household in the CDP was $31,429, and the median income for a family was $33,750. Males had a median income of $35,227 versus $21,250 for females. The per capita income for the CDP was $14,057. None of the families and 7.0% of the population were living below the poverty line.

== 2010 Census ==
The population of the CDP in 2010 was 142. 85.92% of the CDP was Black or African American and 14.08% was White. No one was Hispanic or Latino of any race.
