= Hotel Keturah =

Hotel building in South Carolina, US

- U.S. National Register of Historic Places
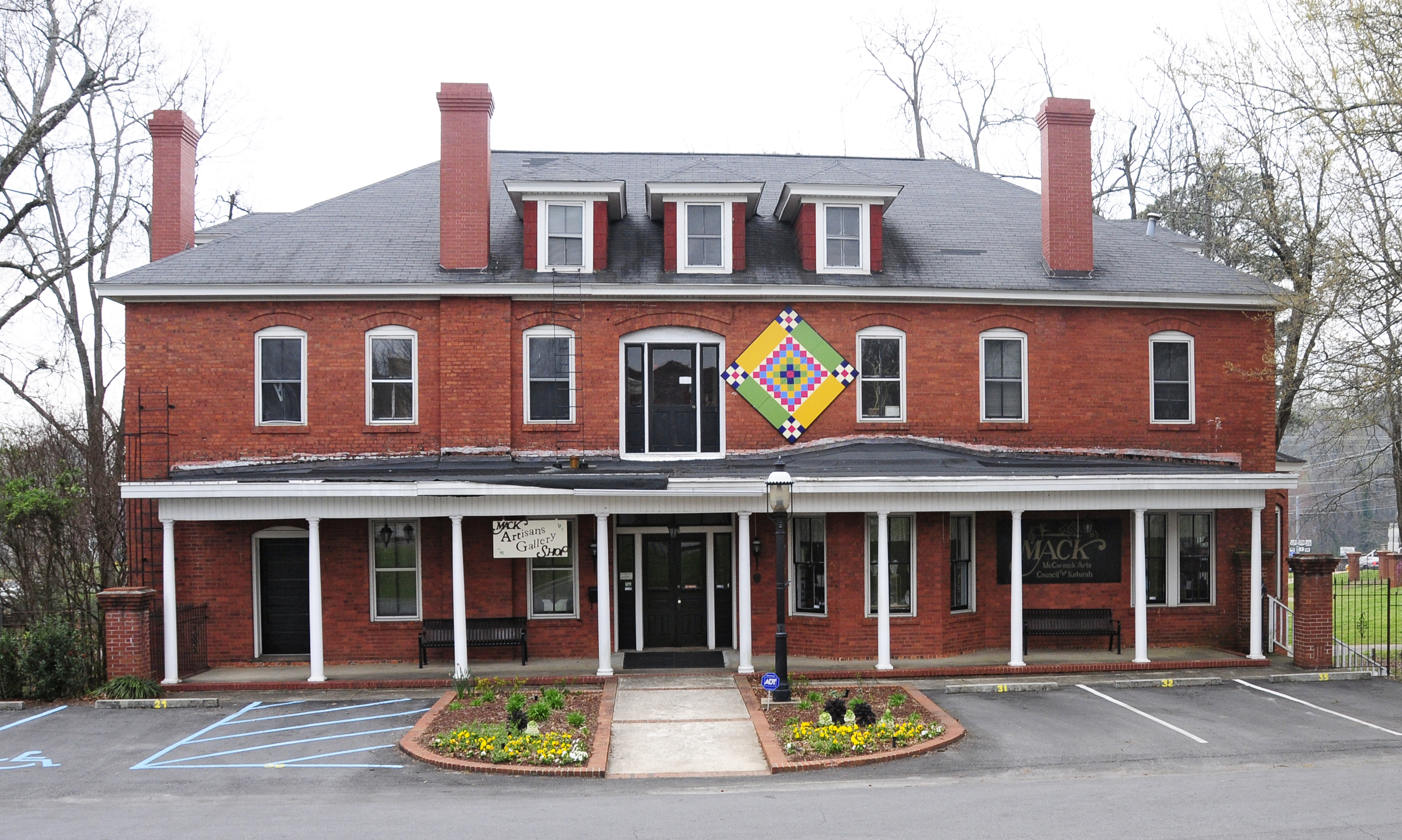
- Hotel Keturah, March 2012

- Location within South Carolina Location within the United States
- Location: Main St., McCormick, South Carolina
- Coordinates: 33°54′43″N 82°17′40″W
- Area: 0.3 acres (0.12 ha)
- Built: 1910
- Architectural style: Colonial Revival
- MPS: McCormick MRA
- NRHP reference No.: 85003345
- Added to NRHP: December 12, 1985

Hotel Keturah is a historic hotel building located at McCormick in McCormick County, South Carolina. It was built about 1910, and is a 2 1/2-story, brick building with a hipped roof in the Colonial Revival style. The front façade features a one-story frame porch with Doric order Tuscan columns.

It was listed on the National Register of Historic Places in 1985.
