= Bradley, South Carolina =

- Census-designated place
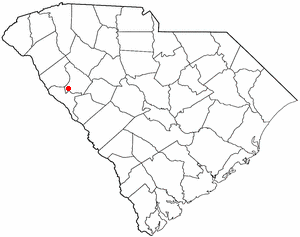
- Location of Bradley, South Carolina
- Coordinates: 34°02′29″N 82°15′12″W
- Country: United States
- State: South Carolina
- County: Greenwood

Area
  - Total: 7.86 sq mi (20.36 km^{2})
  - Land: 7.86 sq mi (20.35 km^{2})
  - Water: 0.0039 sq mi (0.01 km^{2})
- Elevation: 541 ft (165 m)

Population (2020)
  - Total: 160
  - Density: 20.4/sq mi (7.86/km^{2})
- Time zone: UTC-5 (Eastern (EST))
  - Summer (DST): UTC-4 (EDT)
- ZIP code: 29819
- Area codes: 864, 821
- FIPS code: 45-08155
- GNIS feature ID: 2402710

Bradley is an unincorporated community and census-designated place (CDP) in Greenwood County, South Carolina, United States. The population was 170 at the 2010 census.

== History ==
The community has the name of Patrick Bradley, an early settler.

== Geography ==
Bradley is located in southern Greenwood County. U.S. Route 221 passes through the community, leading northeast 13 miles (21 km) to Greenwood, the county seat, and south 11 miles (18 km) to McCormick.

According to the United States Census Bureau, the Bradley CDP has a total area of 7.9 square miles (20.4 km^{2}), all land.

== Demographics ==
Historical population
Census	Pop.	Note	%±
2000	171		—
2010	170		−0.6%
2020	160		−5.9%
U.S. Decennial Census

As of the census of 2000, there were 171 people, 66 households, and 47 families residing in the CDP. The population density was 21.8 people per square mile (8.4/km^{2}). There were 82 housing units at an average density of 10.5/sq mi (4.0/km^{2}). The racial makeup of the CDP was 57.89% White, 40.94% African American, 1.17% from other races.

There were 66 households, out of which 33.3% had children under the age of 18 living with them, 59.1% were married couples living together, 10.6% had a female householder with no husband present, and 27.3% were non-families. 21.2% of all households were made up of individuals, and 16.7% had someone living alone who was 65 years of age or older. The average household size was 2.59 and the average family size was 3.04.

In the CDP, the population was spread out, with 26.3% under the age of 18, 3.5% from 18 to 24, 26.9% from 25 to 44, 21.1% from 45 to 64, and 22.2% who were 65 years of age or older. The median age was 41 years. For every 100 females, there were 92.1 males. For every 100 females age 18 and over, there were 88.1 males.

The median income for a household in the CDP was $43,542, and the median income for a family was $45,000. Males had a median income of $21,875 versus $26,786 for females. The per capita income for the CDP was $15,225. None of the families and 9.7% of the population were living below the poverty line, including no under eighteens and 100.0% of those over 64.

== Education ==
It is in the Greenwood School District 50. The zoned schools are: Mays Elementary School, Westview Middle School, and Emerald High School.
