= Eden Hall =

Historic house in South Carolina, United States

- U.S. National Register of Historic Places
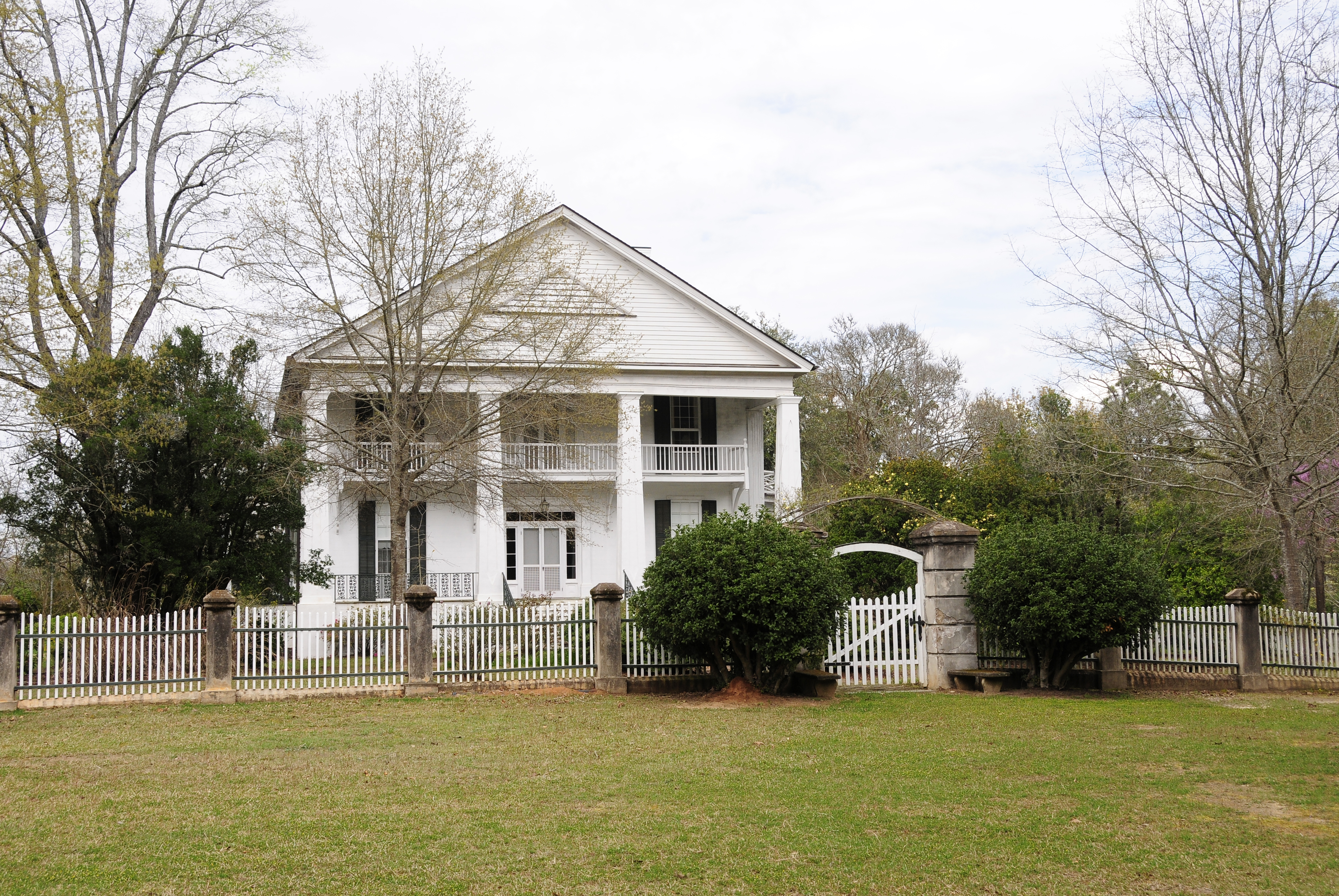
- Eden Hall, March 2012

- Location within South Carolina Location within the United States
- Location: 6 miles northeast of McCormick off U.S. Route 221 and South Carolina Highway 24, near McCormick, South Carolina
- Coordinates: 33°59′19″N 82°15′9″W
- Area: 1 acre (0.40 ha)
- Built: c. 1854
- Architect: Henry Jones
- Architectural style: Greek Revival
- NRHP reference No.: 80003678
- Added to NRHP: September 23, 1980

Eden Hall is a historic plantation house located near McCormick in McCormick County, South Carolina. It was built about 1854, and is a large 2 1/2-story, white frame Greek Revival style dwelling. It sits on a high brick foundation and features a pedimented, two story front portico. Also on the property is the original well and canopy.

It was listed on the National Register of Historic Places in 1980.
