= Mount Carmel, South Carolina =

Mt. Carmel, South Carolina
- CDP
- Location in McCormick County and the state of South Carolina.
- Coordinates: 34°00′44″N 82°30′25″W
- Country: United States
- State: South Carolina
- County: McCormick

Area
  - Total: 9.19 sq mi (23.80 km^{2})
  - Land: 9.19 sq mi (23.80 km^{2})
  - Water: 0 sq mi (0.00 km^{2})
- Elevation: 512 ft (156 m)

Population (2020)
  - Total: 156
  - Density: 17.0/sq mi (6.55/km^{2})
- Time zone: UTC-5 (Eastern (EST))
  - Summer (DST): UTC-4 (EDT)
- ZIP code: 29840
- Area codes: 864, 821
- FIPS code: 45-48310
- GNIS feature ID: 2403309

Mount Carmel or Mt. Carmel is a census-designated place (CDP) in McCormick County, South Carolina, United States.

== History ==
The Calhoun Mill and Mount Carmel Historic District are listed on the National Register of Historic Places.

== Geography ==
According to the United States Census Bureau, the CDP has a total area of 9.2 square miles (23.8 km^{2}), all land.

== Demographics ==
Historical population
| Census | Pop. | Note | %± |
|---|---|---|---|
| 2000 | 233 | | — |
| 2010 | 216 | | −7.3% |
| 2020 | 156 | | −27.8% |
U.S. Decennial Census

=== 2020 census ===
Mount Carmel CDP, South Carolina – Racial and ethnic composition Note: the US Census treats Hispanic/Latino as an ethnic category. This table excludes Latinos from the racial categories and assigns them to a separate category. Hispanics/Latinos may be of any race.
| Race / Ethnicity (NH = Non-Hispanic) | Pop 2000 | Pop 2010 | Pop 2020 | % 2000 | % 2010 | % 2020 |
|---|---|---|---|---|---|---|
| White alone (NH) | 13 | 19 | 20 | 5.49% | 8.80% | 12.82% |
| Black or African American alone (NH) | 213 | 192 | 134 | 89.87% | 88.89% | 85.90% |
| Native American or Alaska Native alone (NH) | 0 | 0 | 0 | 0.00% | 0.00% | 0.00% |
| Asian alone (NH) | 3 | 4 | 0 | 1.27% | 1.85% | 0.00% |
| Native Hawaiian or Pacific Islander alone (NH) | 0 | 0 | 0 | 0.00% | 0.00% | 0.00% |
| Other race alone (NH) | 0 | 0 | 0 | 0.00% | 0.00% | 0.00% |
| Mixed race or Multiracial (NH) | 0 | 1 | 1 | 0.00% | 0.46% | 0.64% |
| Hispanic or Latino (any race) | 4 | 0 | 1 | 1.69% | 0.00% | 0.64% |
| Total | 233 | 216 | 156 | 100.00% | 100.00% | 100.00% |

At the 2000 census there were 237 people, 86 households, and 63 families living in the CDP. The population density was 25.8 people per square mile (9.9/km^{2}). There were 106 housing units at an average density of 11.5/sq mi (4.4/km^{2}). The racial makeup of the CDP was 5.49% White, 89.87% African American, 1.27% Asian, and 3.38% from two or more races. Hispanic or Latino of any race were 1.69%.

Of the 86 households 19.8% had children under the age of 18 living with them, 33.7% were married couples living together, 31.4% had a female householder with no husband present, and 25.6% were non-families. 24.4% of households were one person and 11.6% were one person aged 65 or older. The average household size was 2.76 and the average family size was 3.31.

The age distribution was 24.5% under the age of 18, 9.3% from 18 to 24, 26.2% from 25 to 44, 29.1% from 45 to 64, and 11.0% 65 or older. The median age was 38 years. For every 100 females, there were 94.3 males. For every 100 females age 18 and over, there were 92.5 males.

The median household income was $19,531 and the median family income was $28,500. Males had a median income of $34,375 versus $21,563 for females. The per capita income for the CDP was $9,777. About 46.8% of families and 48.8% of the population were below the poverty line, including 57.1% of those under the age of eighteen and 75.0% of those sixty five or over.

== Notable people ==
- Lawrence L. Hester (1891–1973), politician
