= Diamond Keturah, U.S. Virgin Islands =

Coordinates: 17°42′17″N 64°42′50″W

Diamond Keturah, United States Virgin Islands
- Village
- Interactive map of Diamond Keturah, United States Virgin Islands
- Country: United States Virgin Islands
- Island: Saint Croix
- Time zone: UTC-4 (AST)

Diamond Keturah is a settlement on the island of Saint Croix in the United States Virgin Islands.
