= Plum Branch, South Carolina =

- Town
- Location in McCormick County and the state of South Carolina.
- Coordinates: 33°50′53″N 82°15′31″W
- Country: United States
- State: South Carolina
- County: McCormick

Area
  - Total: 0.36 sq mi (0.94 km^{2})
  - Land: 0.36 sq mi (0.94 km^{2})
  - Water: 0 sq mi (0.00 km^{2})
- Elevation: 463 ft (141 m)

Population (2020)
  - Total: 72
  - Density: 198.8/sq mi (76.75/km^{2})
- Time zone: UTC-5 (Eastern (EST))
  - Summer (DST): UTC-4 (EDT)
- ZIP code: 29845
- Area codes: 864, 821
- FIPS code: 45-57670
- GNIS feature ID: 2407137
- Website: www.facebook.com/pages/category/Community/Town-of-Plum-Branch-SC-117224126355449/

Plum Branch is a town in McCormick County, South Carolina, United States. As of the 2020 census, Plum Branch had a population of 72.

== Geography ==
According to the United States Census Bureau, the town has a total area of 0.4 square miles (1.0 km^{2}), all land.

== Demographics ==
Historical population
| Census | Pop. | Note | %± |
|---|---|---|---|
| 1910 | 145 | | — |
| 1920 | 169 | | 16.6% |
| 1930 | 127 | | −24.9% |
| 1940 | 142 | | 11.8% |
| 1950 | 158 | | 11.3% |
| 1960 | 139 | | −12.0% |
| 1970 | 108 | | −22.3% |
| 1980 | 73 | | −32.4% |
| 1990 | 101 | | 38.4% |
| 2000 | 98 | | −3.0% |
| 2010 | 82 | | −16.3% |
| 2020 | 72 | | −12.2% |
U.S. Decennial Census

As of the 2010 Census, the population was 82, 59 (71.95%) were White, 20 (24.39%) were Black or African American, and 3 (3.66%) were two or more races. None were Hispanic or Latino (of any race) At the 2000 census there were 98 people, 43 households, and 26 families living in the town. The population density was 264.5 inhabitants per square mile (102.1/km^{2}). There were 52 housing units at an average density of 140.4 per square mile (54.2/km^{2}). The racial makeup of the town was 78.57% White and 21.43% African American. Of the 43 households 20.9% had children under the age of 18 living with them, 55.8% were married couples living together, 2.3% had a female householder with no husband present, and 39.5% were non-families. 37.2% of households were one person and 16.3% were one person aged 65 or older. The average household size was 2.28 and the average family size was 3.08.

The age distribution was 22.4% under the age of 18, 6.1% from 18 to 24, 23.5% from 25 to 44, 27.6% from 45 to 64, and 20.4% 65 or older. The median age was 43 years. For every 100 females, there were 81.5 males. For every 100 females age 18 and over, there were 72.7 males.

The median household income was $24,583 and the median family income was $47,917. Males had a median income of $38,750 versus $26,250 for females. The per capita income for the town was $16,358. There were 10.3% of families and 21.9% of the population living below the poverty line, including 26.7% of under eighteens and 35.0% of those over 64.
