= Parksville, South Carolina =

- Town
- Location in McCormick County and the state of South Carolina.
- Coordinates: 33°47′12″N 82°13′03″W
- Country: United States
- State: South Carolina
- County: McCormick

Area
  - Total: 0.73 sq mi (1.89 km^{2})
  - Land: 0.73 sq mi (1.89 km^{2})
  - Water: 0 sq mi (0.00 km^{2})
- Elevation: 338 ft (103 m)

Population (2020)
  - Total: 120
  - Density: 164.9/sq mi (63.65/km^{2})
- Time zone: UTC-5 (Eastern (EST))
  - Summer (DST): UTC-4 (EDT)
- ZIP code: 29844
- Area codes: 864, 821
- FIPS code: 45-54700
- GNIS feature ID: 2407073
- Website: mccormickscchamber.org/what-to-do/historic-railtowns/parksville/

Parksville is a town in McCormick County, South Carolina, United States. As of the 2020 census, Parksville had a population of 120.

== Geography ==
According to the United States Census Bureau, the town has a total area of 0.7 square mile (1.7 km^{2}), all land.

== Demographics ==
Historical population
Census	Pop.	Note	%±
1890	145		—
1900	143		−1.4%
1910	197		37.8%
1920	245		24.4%
1930	175		−28.6%
1940	168		−4.0%
1950	198		17.9%
1960	164		−17.2%
1970	164		0.0%
1980	157		−4.3%
1990	193		22.9%
2000	120		−37.8%
2010	117		−2.5%
2020	120		2.6%
U.S. Decennial Census

As of 2010, the population was 117, 110 (94.02%) of which were White, 4 (3.42%) were two or more races, 3 (2.56%) were Black of African American. 1 (0.85%) were Hispanic or Latino (of any race) At the 2000 census there were 120 people, 51 households, and 37 families living in the town. The population density was 182.6 inhabitants per square mile (70.5/km^{2}). There were 74 housing units at an average density of 112.6 per square mile (43.5/km^{2}). The racial makeup of the town was 88.33% White, 9.17% African American, 0.83% Pacific Islander, 1.67% from other races. Of the 51 households 25.5% had children under the age of 18 living with them, 68.6% were married couples living together, 5.9% had a female householder with no husband present, and 25.5% were non-families. 17.6% of households were one person and 13.7% were one person aged 65 or older. The average household size was 2.35 and the average family size was 2.66.

The age distribution was 17.5% under the age of 18, 5.0% from 18 to 24, 27.5% from 25 to 44, 25.0% from 45 to 64, and 25.0% 65 or older. The median age was 45 years. For every 100 females, there were 87.5 males. For every 100 females age 18 and over, there were 76.8 males.

The median household income was $38,958 and the median family income was $39,583. Males had a median income of $42,188 versus $25,750 for females. The per capita income for the town was $20,607. There were no families and 2.5% of the population living below the poverty line, including no under eighteens and none of those over 64.
