= McCormick, South Carolina =

- Town
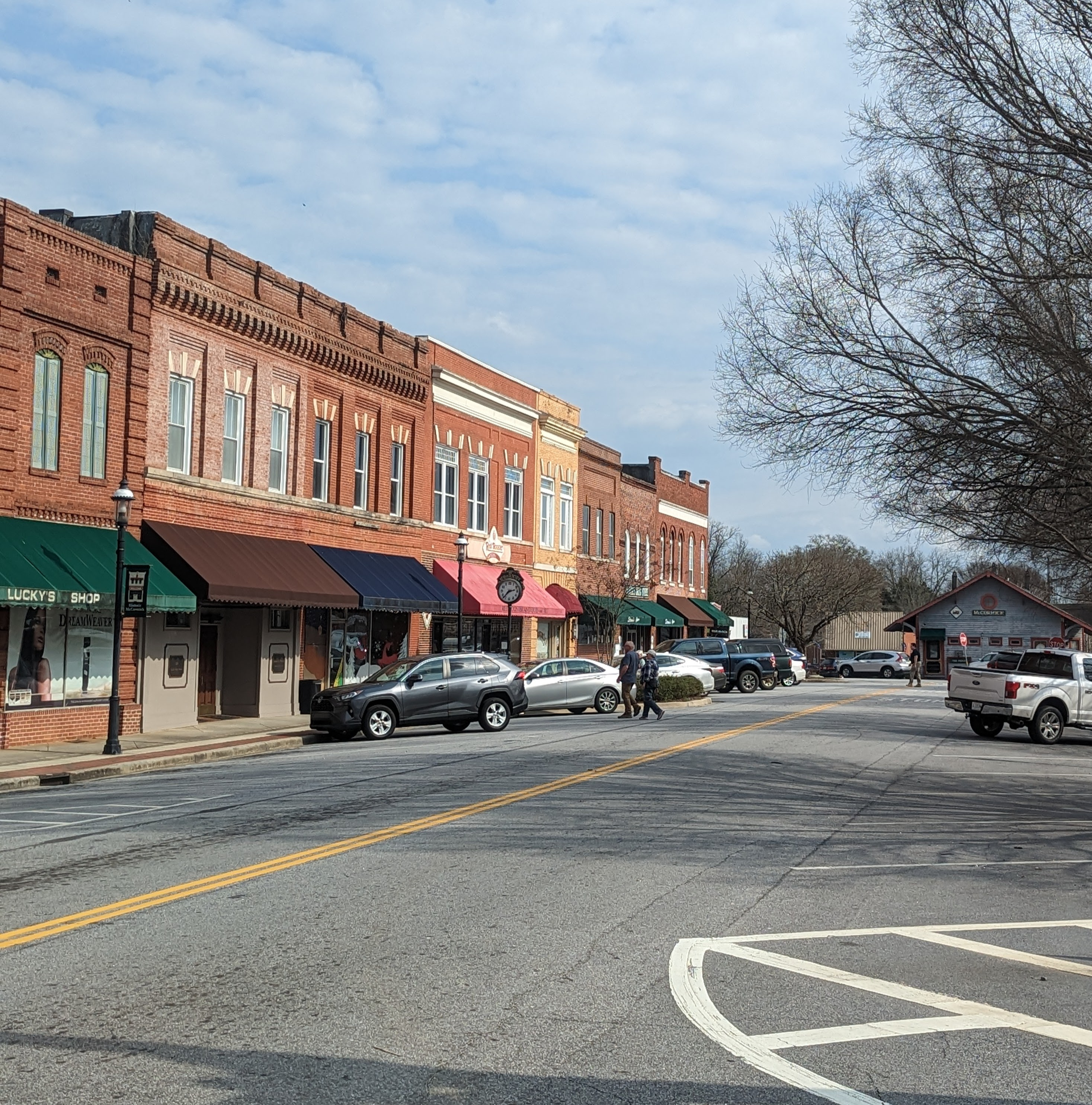
- Downtown McCormick

- Seal

- Location in McCormick County and the state of South Carolina.
- Coordinates: 33°55′14″N 82°15′58″W
- Country: United States
- State: South Carolina
- County: McCormick

Area
  - Total: 4.05 sq mi (10.49 km^{2})
  - Land: 4.05 sq mi (10.49 km^{2})
  - Water: 0 sq mi (0.00 km^{2})
- Elevation: 509 ft (155 m)

Population (2020)
  - Total: 2,232
  - Density: 551/sq mi (212.7/km^{2})
- Time zone: UTC−5 (Eastern (EST))
  - Summer (DST): UTC−4 (EDT)
- ZIP codes: 29835, 29899
- Area codes: 864, 821
- FIPS code: 45-43720
- GNIS feature ID: 2406127
- Website: www.townofmccormicksc.com

McCormick is a town in McCormick County, South Carolina, United States. As of 2024, McCormick, South Carolina population is 2,225 as of July, 2024. The population was 2,232 at the 2020 census. It is the county seat of McCormick County. The town of McCormick is named for inventor Cyrus McCormick.

== History ==
The Dorn Gold Mine, Dorn's Flour and Grist Mill, Joseph Jennings Dorn House, Eden Hall, Farmer's Bank, John Albert Gibert M.D. House, Otway Henderson House, Hotel Keturah, McCormick County Courthouse, McCormick Train Station, and M.L.B. Sturkey House are listed on the National Register of Historic Places.

== Geography ==
According to the United States Census Bureau, the town has a total area of 3.8 square miles (9.8 km^{2}), all land.

== Demographics ==
Historical population
Census	Pop.	Note	%±
1900	237		—
1910	613		158.6%
1920	1,284		109.5%
1930	1,304		1.6%
1940	1,456		11.7%
1950	1,744		19.8%
1960	1,998		14.6%
1970	1,864		−6.7%
1980	1,725		−7.5%
1990	1,659		−3.8%
2000	1,489		−10.2%
2010	2,783		86.9%
2020	2,232		−19.8%
U.S. Decennial Census

=== 2020 census ===
McCormick racial composition
Race	Num.	Perc.
White (non-Hispanic)	664	29.75%
Black or African American (non-Hispanic)	1,467	65.73%
Native American	4	0.18%
Asian	10	0.45%
Other/Mixed	52	2.33%
Hispanic or Latino	43	1.57%

As of the 2020 United States census, there were 2,232 people, 912 households, and 477 families residing in the town.

=== 2000 census ===
At the 2000 census there were 1,489 people, 657 households, and 400 families living in the town. The population density was 396.4 inhabitants per square mile (153.1/km^{2}). There were 737 housing units at an average density of 196.2 per square mile (75.8/km^{2}). The racial makeup of the town was 32.51% White, 64.07% African American, 0.13% Native American, 0.13% Asian, 1.41% from other races, and 1.75% from two or more races. Hispanic or Latino of any race were 1.54%.

Of the 657 households 26.3% had children under the age of 18 living with them, 33.3% were married couples living together, 23.9% had a female householder with no husband present, and 39.1% were non-families. 37.4% of households were one person and 16.0% were one person aged 65 or older. The average household size was 2.24 and the average family size was 2.95.

The age distribution was 24.0% under the age of 18, 8.6% from 18 to 24, 22.5% from 25 to 44, 26.3% from 45 to 64, and 18.7% 65 or older. The median age was 41 years. For every 100 females, there were 77.9 males. For every 100 females age 18 and over, there were 75.8 males.

The median household income was $19,688 and the median family income was $34,375. Males had a median income of $26,027 versus $20,263 for females. The per capita income for the town was $14,338. About 20.7% of families and 26.8% of the population were below the poverty line, including 38.3% of those under age 18 and 18.4% of those age 65 or over. According to the 2010 Census, the population was 2,783. 1,900 (68.27%) were Black or African, 820 (29.46%) were White, 26 (0.93%) were two or more races, 14 (0.50%) were Asian, 13 (0.47%) were some other race, 5 (0.18%) were American Indian or Alaska Native, 5 (0.18%) were Native Hawaiian or other Pacific Islander. 45 (1.62%) were Hispanic or Latino of any race.

== Education ==
There is one school district in the entire county, the McCormick County School District. The district is headquartered in McCormick.

McCormick has a public library, the McCormick County Library.

The John de la Howe School, located in McCormick County, is a Governor's School for Agriculture. The South Carolina Governor's School for Agriculture at John de la Howe (JDLH) is a state-funded public residential high school that has an agricultural education program.

== Notable people ==
- John C. Calhoun - Vice President of the United States
- Sara M. Evans - Historian
- Johnny Letman - Musician
- Patrick Noble - SC Governor
