= McCormick County, South Carolina =

County in South Carolina, United States

- County
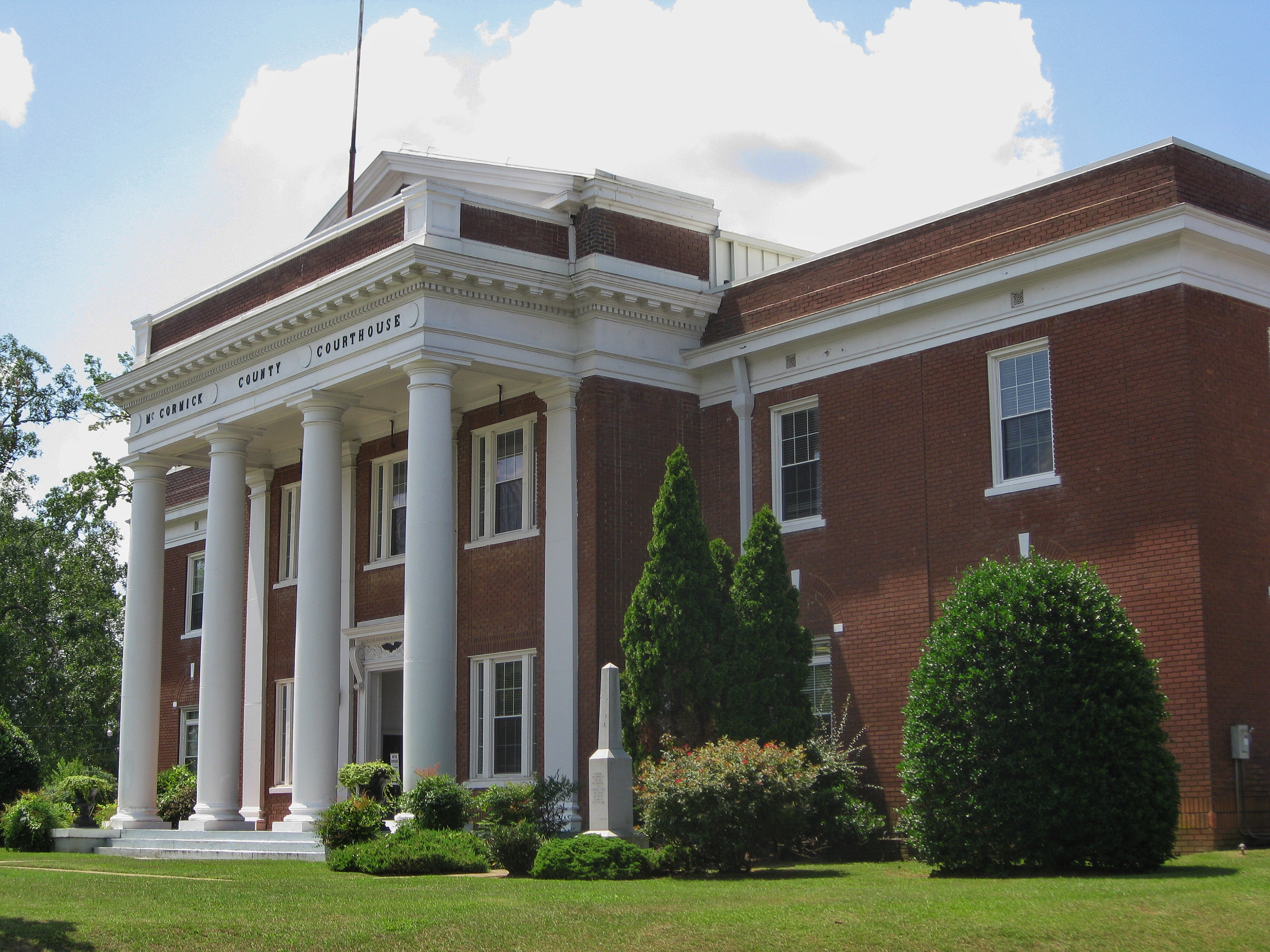
- McCormick County Courthouse

- Seal
- Motto: "The Natural Place Of Life"
- Location within the U.S. state of South Carolina
- Interactive map of McCormick County, South Carolina
- Coordinates: 33.90°N 82.32°W
- Country: United States
- State: South Carolina
- Founded: 1916
- Named for: Cyrus McCormick
- Seat: McCormick
- Largest community: McCormick

Area
  - Total: 393.61 sq mi (1,019.4 km^{2})
  - Land: 358.87 sq mi (929.5 km^{2})
  - Water: 34.74 sq mi (90.0 km^{2}) 8.83%

Population (2020)
  - Total: 9,526
  - Estimate (2025): 10,215 ▲
  - Density: 26.54/sq mi (10.25/km^{2})
- Time zone: UTC−5 (Eastern)
  - Summer (DST): UTC−4 (EDT)
- Congressional district: 3rd
- Website: mccormickcountysc.org

McCormick County is a county located in the U.S. state of South Carolina. As of the 2020 census, its population was 9,526, making it the second-least populous county in South Carolina. Its county seat is McCormick. The county was formed in 1916 from parts of Edgefield, Abbeville, and Greenwood counties.

== History ==
The county was founded in 1916 with portions of Edgefield, Abbeville, and Greenwood counties and was named after Cyrus McCormick. The largest community and county seat is McCormick.

== Geography ==
According to the U.S. Census Bureau, the county has a total area of 393.61 square miles (1,019.4 km^{2}), of which 358.87 square miles (929.5 km^{2}) is land and 34.74 square miles (90.0 km^{2}) (8.83%) is water. It is the smallest county in South Carolina by land area and second-smallest by total area. McCormick County is in the Savannah River basin.

=== National protected area ===
- Sumter National Forest (part)

=== State and local protected areas/sites ===
- Baker Creek State Park
- Eden Hall
- Hamilton Branch State Recreation Area
- Hickory Knob State Resort Park
- James L. Mason Wildlife Management Area
- Leroys Ferry Recreation Area
- Long Cane Creek Picnic Area
- Parksville Recreation Area
- Price's Mill
- Savannah Lakes Beach
- Stevens Creek Heritage Preserve/Wildlife Management Area (part)
- Sumter National Forest - Long Cane Ranger District

=== Major water bodies ===
- J. Strom Thurmond Reservoir
- Savannah River
- Steven Creek

=== Adjacent counties ===
- Greenwood County – northeast
- Edgefield County – east
- Columbia County, Georgia – south
- Lincoln County, Georgia – west
- Elbert County, Georgia – northwest
- Abbeville County – northwest

=== Major highways ===
- US 221
- US 378
- SC 10
- SC 23
- SC 28
- SC 81
- SC 283
- SC 823

== Demographics ==
Historical population
Census	Pop.	Note	%±
1920	16,444		—
1930	11,471		−30.2%
1940	10,367		−9.6%
1950	9,577		−7.6%
1960	8,629		−9.9%
1970	7,955		−7.8%
1980	7,797		−2.0%
1990	8,868		13.7%
2000	9,958		12.3%
2010	10,233		2.8%
2020	9,526		−6.9%
2025 (est.)	10,215	▲	7.2%
U.S. Decennial Census; 1790–1960 1900–1990; 1990–2000 2010 2020

=== 2020 census ===
As of the 2020 census, there were 9,526 people, 4,080 households, and 2,513 families residing in the county. The median age was 58.5 years, with 11.4% under the age of 18 and 37.5% 65 years of age or older. For every 100 females there were 112.8 males, and for every 100 females age 18 and over there were 113.2 males.

Of the 4,080 households, 17.3% had children under the age of 18 living with them and 28.3% had a female householder with no spouse or partner present. About 30.3% of all households were made up of individuals and 17.1% had someone living alone who was 65 years of age or older.

There were 5,380 housing units, of which 24.2% were vacant. Among occupied housing units, 81.3% were owner-occupied and 18.8% were renter-occupied. The homeowner vacancy rate was 1.8% and the rental vacancy rate was 9.1%.

0.0% of residents lived in urban areas, while 100.0% lived in rural areas.

The racial makeup of the county was 54.4% White, 41.3% Black or African American, 0.3% American Indian and Alaska Native, 0.4% Asian, 0.1% Native Hawaiian and Pacific Islander, 0.7% from some other race, and 2.9% from two or more races. Hispanic or Latino residents of any race comprised 1.3% of the population.

=== Racial and ethnic composition ===
McCormick County, South Carolina – Racial and ethnic composition Note: the US Census treats Hispanic/Latino as an ethnic category. This table excludes Latinos from the racial categories and assigns them to a separate category. Hispanics/Latinos may be of any race.
Race / Ethnicity (NH = Non-Hispanic)	Pop 1980	Pop 1990	Pop 2000	Pop 2010	Pop 2020	% 1980	% 1990	% 2000	% 2010	% 2020
White alone (NH)	3,033	3,640	4,426	4,941	5,155	38.90%	41.05%	44.45%	48.28%	54.12%
Black or African American alone (NH)	4,656	5,180	5,349	5,069	3,916	59.72%	58.41%	53.72%	49.54%	41.11%
Native American or Alaska Native alone (NH)	12	6	7	9	27	0.15%	0.07%	0.07%	0.09%	0.28%
Asian alone (NH)	6	11	29	34	36	0.08%	0.12%	0.29%	0.33%	0.38%
Native Hawaiian or Pacific Islander alone (NH)	x	x	3	3	2	x	x	0.03%	0.03%	0.02%
Other race alone (NH)	6	5	5	12	32	0.08%	0.06%	0.05%	0.12%	0.34%
Mixed race or Multiracial (NH)	x	x	53	84	235	x	x	0.53%	0.82%	2.47%
Hispanic or Latino (any race)	84	26	86	81	123	1.08%	0.29%	0.86%	0.79%	1.29%
Total	7,797	8,868	9,958	10,233	9,526	100.00%	100.00%	100.00%	100.00%	100.00%

=== 2010 census ===
At the 2010 census, there were 10,233 people, 4,027 households, and 2,798 families living in the county. The population density was 28.5 inhabitants per square mile (11.0/km^{2}). There were 5,453 housing units at an average density of 15.2 per square mile (5.9/km^{2}). The racial makeup of the county was 49.7% black or African American, 48.7% white, 0.3% Asian, 0.1% Pacific islander, 0.1% American Indian, 0.2% from other races, and 0.9% from two or more races. Those of Hispanic or Latino origin made up 0.8% of the population. In terms of ancestry, 10.7% were English, 10.2% were American, 10.2% were German, and 6.0% were Irish.

Of the 4,027 households, 21.0% had children under the age of 18 living with them, 50.4% were married couples living together, 15.2% had a female householder with no husband present, 30.5% were non-families, and 27.4% of all households were made up of individuals. The average household size was 2.22 and the average family size was 2.65. The median age was 50.0 years.

The median income for a household in the county was $35,858 and the median income for a family was $43,021. Males had a median income of $32,606 versus $28,067 for females. The per capita income for the county was $19,411. About 14.2% of families and 18.2% of the population were below the poverty line, including 37.6% of those under age 18 and 7.9% of those age 65 or over.

=== 2000 census ===
At the 2000 census, there were 9,958 people, 3,558 households and 2,604 families living in the county. The population density was 28 people per square mile (11 people/km^{2}). There were 4,459 housing units at an average density of 12 per square mile (4.6/km^{2}). The racial makeup of the county was 53.88% Black or African American, 44.78% White, 0.07% Native American, 0.29% Asian, 0.03% Pacific Islander, 0.38% from other races, and 0.57% from two or more races. 0.86% of the population were Hispanic or Latino of any race.

There were 3,558 households, out of which 24.80% had children under the age of 18 living with them, 51.80% were married couples living together, 17.60% had a female householder with no husband present and 26.80% were non-families. 24.40% of all households were made up of individuals, and 10.20% had someone living alone who was 65 years of age or older. The average household size was 2.39 and the average family size was 2.82.

In the county, the population was spread out, with 19.50% under the age of 18, 8.30% from 18 to 24, 27.60% from 25 to 44, 28.10% from 45 to 64 and 16.50% who were 65 years of age or older. The median age was 41 years. For every 100 females there were 113.70 males. For every 100 females age 18 and over, there were 115.80 males.

The median income for a household in the county was $31,577, and the median income for a family was $38,822. Males had a median income of $28,824 versus $21,587 for females. The per capita income for the county was $14,770. About 15.10% of families and 17.90% of the population were below the poverty line, including 26.50% of those under age 18 and 11.90% of those age 65 or over.

== Government and politics ==
Like most rural South Carolina counties with a tight Black-white population ratio, the Democratic Party has fared well in McCormick County compared to others across the South, especially with the national party's cultural turn to the left in the 2000s and 2010s. However, in 2016 Donald Trump won the county by one fewer vote than Barack Obama did in 2012, marking the first GOP victory in the area since Richard Nixon in 1972. Trump carried the county again in both subsequent elections, winning it by over 17 points in 2024.

United States presidential election results for McCormick County, South Carolina
Year	Republican		Democratic		Third party(ies)	
Year	No.	%	No.	%	No.	%
1916	0	0.00%	637	99.69%	2	0.31%
1920	0	0.00%	557	100.00%	0	0.00%
1924	15	2.72%	520	94.37%	16	2.90%
1928	20	3.14%	615	96.70%	1	0.16%
1932	5	0.93%	530	99.07%	0	0.00%
1936	8	1.20%	656	98.80%	0	0.00%
1940	11	2.56%	419	97.44%	0	0.00%
1944	1	0.28%	307	86.72%	46	12.99%
1948	0	0.00%	30	4.04%	713	95.96%
1952	577	48.04%	624	51.96%	0	0.00%
1956	102	11.74%	485	55.81%	282	32.45%
1960	347	33.79%	680	66.21%	0	0.00%
1964	939	65.34%	498	34.66%	0	0.00%
1968	466	21.08%	988	44.69%	757	34.24%
1972	1,302	60.22%	844	39.04%	16	0.74%
1976	640	26.37%	1,774	73.09%	13	0.54%
1980	797	30.60%	1,774	68.10%	34	1.31%
1984	1,186	43.51%	1,526	55.98%	14	0.51%
1988	1,172	40.22%	1,722	59.09%	20	0.69%
1992	899	29.46%	1,846	60.48%	307	10.06%
1996	1,104	35.35%	1,858	59.49%	161	5.16%
2000	1,704	46.54%	1,896	51.79%	61	1.67%
2004	2,396	46.78%	2,648	51.70%	78	1.52%
2008	2,437	46.58%	2,755	52.66%	40	0.76%
2012	2,467	47.81%	2,653	51.41%	40	0.78%
2016	2,652	50.84%	2,479	47.53%	85	1.63%
2020	2,958	51.92%	2,687	47.17%	52	0.91%
2024	3,565	57.94%	2,513	40.84%	75	1.22%

== Economy ==
In 2022, the GDP was $278 million (about $27,961 per capita), and the real GDP was $222.8 million (about $22,410 per capita) in chained 2017 dollars.

As of April 2024, some of the largest employers in the county include Food Lion, the United States Department of Defense, and the United States Postal Service.

Employment and Wage Statistics by Industry in McCormick County, South Carolina - Q3 2023
Industry	Employment Counts	Employment Percentage (%)	Average Annual Wage ($)
Accommodation and Food Services	94	5.5	16,484
Administrative and Support and Waste Management and Remediation Services	66	3.9	42,224
Agriculture, Forestry, Fishing and Hunting	37	2.2	41,548
Construction	92	5.4	50,336
Finance and Insurance	23	1.3	50,648
Health Care and Social Assistance	351	20.5	34,996
Information	5	0.3	70,304
Manufacturing	113	6.6	42,588
Other Services (except Public Administration)	205	12.0	28,600
Professional, Scientific, and Technical Services	85	5.0	65,208
Public Administration	380	22.2	47,528
Real Estate and Rental and Leasing	23	1.3	94,380
Retail Trade	226	13.2	23,764
Wholesale Trade	13	0.8	34,268
Total	1,713	100.0%	38,862

== Communities ==
=== Towns ===
- McCormick (county seat and largest community)
- Parksville
- Plum Branch

=== Census-designated places ===
- Clarks Hill
- Modoc
- Mount Carmel
- Willington

== Education ==
There is one school district in the entire county, the McCormick County School District.

The state-operated South Carolina Governor's School for Agriculture at John de la Howe is in an unincorporated area in the county.

The McCormick County Library provides library services.

== Notable people ==
- Johnny Letman, musician
- Patrick Noble, governor of South Carolina (1838–1840)

== See also ==
- List of counties in South Carolina
- National Register of Historic Places listings in McCormick County, South Carolina
