= List of high schools in South Carolina =

This is a list of high schools in the U.S. state of South Carolina.

== Abbeville County ==
- Abbeville High School, Abbeville
- Calhoun Falls Charter School, Calhoun Falls
- Dixie High School, Due West

== Aiken County ==
- Midland Valley High School, Graniteville
- Ridge Spring-Monetta Middle-High School, Monetta
- Wagener-Salley High School, Wagener

=== Aiken ===
- Aiken High School
- Mead Hall Episcopal School
- Silver Bluff High School
- South Aiken Baptist Christian School
- South Aiken High School
- Town Creek Christian Academy

=== North Augusta ===
- North Augusta High School
- Victory Christian School

== Allendale County ==
- Allendale-Fairfax High School, Fairfax

== Anderson County ==
- Belton-Honea Path High School, Honea Path
- Crescent High School, Iva
- Palmetto High School, Williamston
- Pendleton High School, Pendleton
- Powdersville High School, Powdersville
- Wren High School, Piedmont

=== Anderson ===
- Anderson Christian School
- Montessori School of Anderson
- New Covenant Christian School
- Oakwood Christian School
- T. L. Hanna High School
- Temple Christian Academy
- Westside High School

== Bamberg County ==
- Bamberg-Ehrhardt High School, Bamberg
- Denmark-Olar High School, Denmark

== Barnwell County ==
- Barnwell High School, Barnwell
- Blackville-Hilda High School, Blackville
- Williston-Elko High School, Williston

== Beaufort County ==
- Beaufort Academy, Lady's Island
- St. John Paul II Catholic School, Okatie

=== Beaufort ===
- Battery Creek High School
- Beaufort High School
- Bridges Preparatory School
- Lowcountry Montessori School
- Whale Branch Early College High School

=== Bluffton ===
- Bluffton High School
- Hilton Head Christian Academy
- May River High School

=== Hilton Head ===
- Hilton Head Island High School
- Hilton Head Preparatory School

== Berkeley County ==
- Berkeley High School, Moncks Corner
- Bishop England High School, Charleston
- Cane Bay High School, Summerville
- Cross High School, Cross
- Hanahan High School, Hanahan
- Timberland High School, St. Stephen

=== Goose Creek ===
- Goose Creek High School
- Stratford High School

== Calhoun County ==
=== St. Matthews ===
- Calhoun Academy
- Calhoun County High School

== Charleston County ==
=== Charleston ===
- Allegro Charter School of Music
- Ashley Hall
- Burke High School
- Charleston Advancement Academy
- Charleston Charter School for Math and Science
- First Baptist School
- James Island Charter High School
- James Island Christian School
- Learn4Life High School
- Porter-Gaud School
- Septima P. Clark Alternative Academy
- West Ashley High School

=== Hollywood ===
- Baptist Hill High School
- Lowcountry Leadership Charter School

=== Johns Island ===
- Charleston Collegiate School
- St. John's High School

=== Mount Pleasant ===
- Lucy Garrett Beckham High School
- Oceanside Recruiting Academy
- University School of the Lowcountry
- Wando High School

=== North Charleston ===
- Academic Magnet High School
- Charleston County School of the Arts
- Greg Mathis Charter High School
- Liberty Hill Academy
- Lowcountry Acceleration Academy
- Military Magnet Academy
- North Charleston High School
- Northside Christian School
- Palmetto Scholars Academy
- R.B. Stall High School

== Cherokee County ==
- Blacksburg High School, Blacksburg

=== Gaffney ===
- Gaffney High School
- Heritage Christian Academy

== Chester County ==
- Chester Senior High School, Chester
- Great Falls High School, Great Falls
- Lewisville High School, Richburg

== Chesterfield County ==
- Central High School, Pageland
- Cheraw High School, Cheraw
- Chesterfield High School, Chesterfield
- McBee High School, McBee

== Clarendon County ==
=== Manning ===
- Laurence Manning Academy
- Manning High School

=== Summerton ===
- Clarendon Hall School
- Scott's Branch High School

=== Turbeville ===
- East Clarendon High School

== Colleton County ==
=== Walterboro ===
- Colleton County High School
- Colleton Preparatory Academy

== Darlington County ==
- Lamar High School (South Carolina), Lamar

=== Darlington ===
- Darlington High School
- Mayo High School for Math, Science, and Technology

=== Hartsville ===
- Emmanuel Christian School
- Hartsville High School
- South Carolina Governor's School for Science and Mathematics

== Dillon County ==
- Lake View High School, Lake View
- Latta High School, Latta

=== Dillon ===
- Dillon Christian School
- Dillon High School

== Dorchester County ==
- Woodland High School, Dorchester

=== North Charleston ===
- Cathedral Academy
- Fort Dorchester High School

=== Summerville ===
- Ashley Ridge High School
- Pinewood Preparatory School
- Summerville High School

== Edgefield County ==
- Fox Creek High School, North Augusta
- Strom Thurmond High School, Johnston

== Fairfield County ==
=== Winnsboro ===
- Fairfield Central High School
- Richard Winn Academy

== Florence County ==
- Hannah-Pamplico High School, Pamplico
- Johnsonville High School, Johnsonville
- Timmonsville High School, Timmonsville
- Trinity Collegiate School, Darlington

=== Florence ===
- Florence Christian School
- South Florence High School
- The King's Academy
- Maranatha Christian School
- West Florence High School
- Wilson High School

=== Lake City ===
- The Carolina Academy
- Lake City High School

== Georgetown County ==
- Andrews High School, Andrews
- Carvers Bay High School, Hemingway
- Georgetown High School, Georgetown
- Waccamaw High School, Pawleys Island

== Greenville County ==
- Mauldin High School, Mauldin
- Travelers Rest High School, Travelers Rest

=== Fountain Inn ===
- Fountain Inn Christian School
- Fountain Inn High School

=== Greenville ===
- Berea High School
- Carolina High School & Academy
- Christ Church Episcopal School
- The Fine Arts Center
- First Presbyterian Academy
- GREEN Upstate High School
- Greenville High School
- Greenville Technical Charter High School
- Hampton Park Christian School
- J. L. Mann High School
- Legacy Early College
- South Carolina Governor's School for the Arts & Humanities
- Southside High School
- St. Joseph's Catholic School
- Tabernacle Christian School
- Wade Hampton High School

=== Greer ===
- Blue Ridge High School
- Calvary Christian School
- Greer High School
- Riverside High School

=== Piedmont ===
- Piedmont Christian School
- Woodmont High School

=== Simpsonville ===
- Brashier Middle College Charter High School
- Greenville Classical Academy
- Hillcrest High School
- Southside Christian School

=== Taylors ===
- Eastside High School
- Greer Middle College Charter High School

== Greenwood County ==
- Ninety-Six High School, Ninety-Six
- Ware Shoals High School, Ware Shoals

=== Greenwood ===
- Cambridge Academy
- Emerald High School
- Greenwood Christian School
- Greenwood High School
- Palmetto Christian Academy

== Hampton County ==
- Hampton County High School, Varnville
- Patrick Henry Academy

== Horry County ==
- Aynor High School, Aynor
- Green Sea-Floyds High School, Green Sea
- Loris High School, Loris
- North Myrtle Beach Christian School, Longs
- North Myrtle Beach High School, Little River
- St. James High School, Burgess

=== Conway ===
- Academy for Technology & Academics
- Conway High School
- Scholars Academy

=== Myrtle Beach ===
- Academy for the Arts, Science and Technology
- Carolina Forest High School
- Christian Academy of Myrtle Beach
- Coastal Leadership Academy
- Myrtle Beach High School
- Risen Christ Christian Academy
- St. Elizabeth Ann Seton Catholic High School
- Socastee High School
- Valorous Academy

== Jasper County ==
=== Ridgeland ===
- Ridgeland-Hardeeville High School
- Polaris Tech Charter School
- Thomas Heyward Academy

== Kershaw County ==
- Lugoff-Elgin High School, Lugoff
- North Central High School, Kershaw

=== Camden ===
- Camden High School
- Camden Military Academy

== Lancaster County ==
- Andrew Jackson High School, Kershaw
- Indian Land High School, Fort Mill

=== Lancaster ===
- Buford High School
- Lancaster High School

== Laurens County ==
- Clinton High School, Clinton

=== Laurens ===
- Laurens Academy
- Laurens District 55 High School

== Lee County ==
=== Bishopville ===
- Lee Central High School
- Lee Academy
- Pee Dee Math, Science, and Technology Academy

== Lexington County ==
- Airport High School, West Columbia
- Batesburg-Leesville High School, Batesburg
- Brookland-Cayce High School, Cayce
- Chapin High School, Chapin
- Gilbert High School, Gilbert
- Pelion High School, Pelion
- Swansea High School, Swansea

=== Irmo ===
- Dutch Fork High School
- Irmo High School

=== Lexington ===
- Lexington High School
- River Bluff High School
- White Knoll High School

== Marion County ==
- Marion High School, Marion
- Mullins High School, Mullins

== Marlboro County ==
=== Bennettsville ===
- Marlboro Academy
- Marlboro County High School

== McCormick County ==
=== McCormick ===
- McCormick High School
- South Carolina Governor's School for Agriculture at John de la Howe

== Newberry County ==
- Mid-Carolina High School, Prosperity
- Whitmire Community School, Whitmire

=== Newberry ===
- Newberry Academy
- Newberry High School

== Oconee County ==
- Walhalla High School, Walhalla
- West-Oak High School, Westminster

=== Seneca ===
- Oconee Christian Academy
- Seneca Senior High School

== Orangeburg County ==
- Bethune-Bowman Middle/High School, Rowesville
- Branchville High School, Branchville
- Edisto High School, Cordova
- Hunter-Kinard-Tyler High School, Norway
- Lake Marion High School & Technology Center, Santee
- North High School, North

=== Orangeburg ===
- Orangeburg Preparatory Schools
- Orangeburg-Wilkinson Senior High School
- Orangeburg High School For Health Professions

== Pickens County ==
- D. W. Daniel High School, Central
- Liberty High School, Liberty

=== Easley ===
- Easley Christian School
- Easley High School

=== Pickens ===
- Lakeview Christian School
- Pickens High School

== Richland County ==
- Lower Richland High School, Hopkins

=== Blythewood ===
- Blythewood High School
- Westwood High School

=== Columbia ===
==== Public ====
- A.C. Flora High School
- C.A. Johnson High School
- Columbia High School
- Dreher High School
- Midlands Arts Conservatory
- Midlands Middle College
- Eau Claire High School
- Richland Northeast High School
- Ridge View High School
- Spring Valley High School
- W.J. Keenan High School

==== Private ====
- Ben Lippen School
- Cardinal Newman High School
- Covenant Classical Christian School
- Grace Christian School
- Hammond School
- Heathwood Hall Episcopal School
- Northside Christian Academy

== Saluda County ==
- Saluda High School, Saluda

== Spartanburg County ==
- Boiling Springs High School, Boiling Springs
- Woodruff High School, Woodruff
- Chesnee High School, Chesnee
- Chapman High School, Inman
- James F. Byrnes High School, Duncan
- Landrum High School, Landrum
- Dorman High School, Roebuck

=== Spartanburg ===
- Broome High School
- High Point Academy
- Oakbrook Preparatory School
- South Carolina School for the Deaf and Blind
- Spartanburg Christian Academy
- Spartanburg Day School
- Spartanburg High School
- Spartanburg Preparatory School
- Westgate Christian School

== Sumter County ==
- Thomas Sumter Academy, Rembert

=== Sumter ===
- Crestwood High School
- Lakewood High School
- St Francis Xavier High School
- Sumter Christian School
- Sumter High School
- Wilson Hall

== Union County ==
- Union County High School, Union

== Williamsburg County ==
- Hemingway High School, Hemingway

=== Kingstree ===
- Kingstree Senior High School
- Williamsburg Academy

== York County ==
- Clover High School, Clover

=== Fort Mill ===
- Fort Mill High School
- Nation Ford High School
- Catawba Ridge High School

=== Rock Hill ===
- Legion Collegiate Academy
- Northwestern High School
- Riverwalk Academy
- Rock Hill High School
- St. Anne's Catholic High School
- South Pointe High School
- Westminster Catawba Christian School

=== York ===
- York Comprehensive High School
- York Preparatory Academy

== See also ==
- List of school districts in South Carolina
