= Zion Williamson =

American basketball player (born 2000)

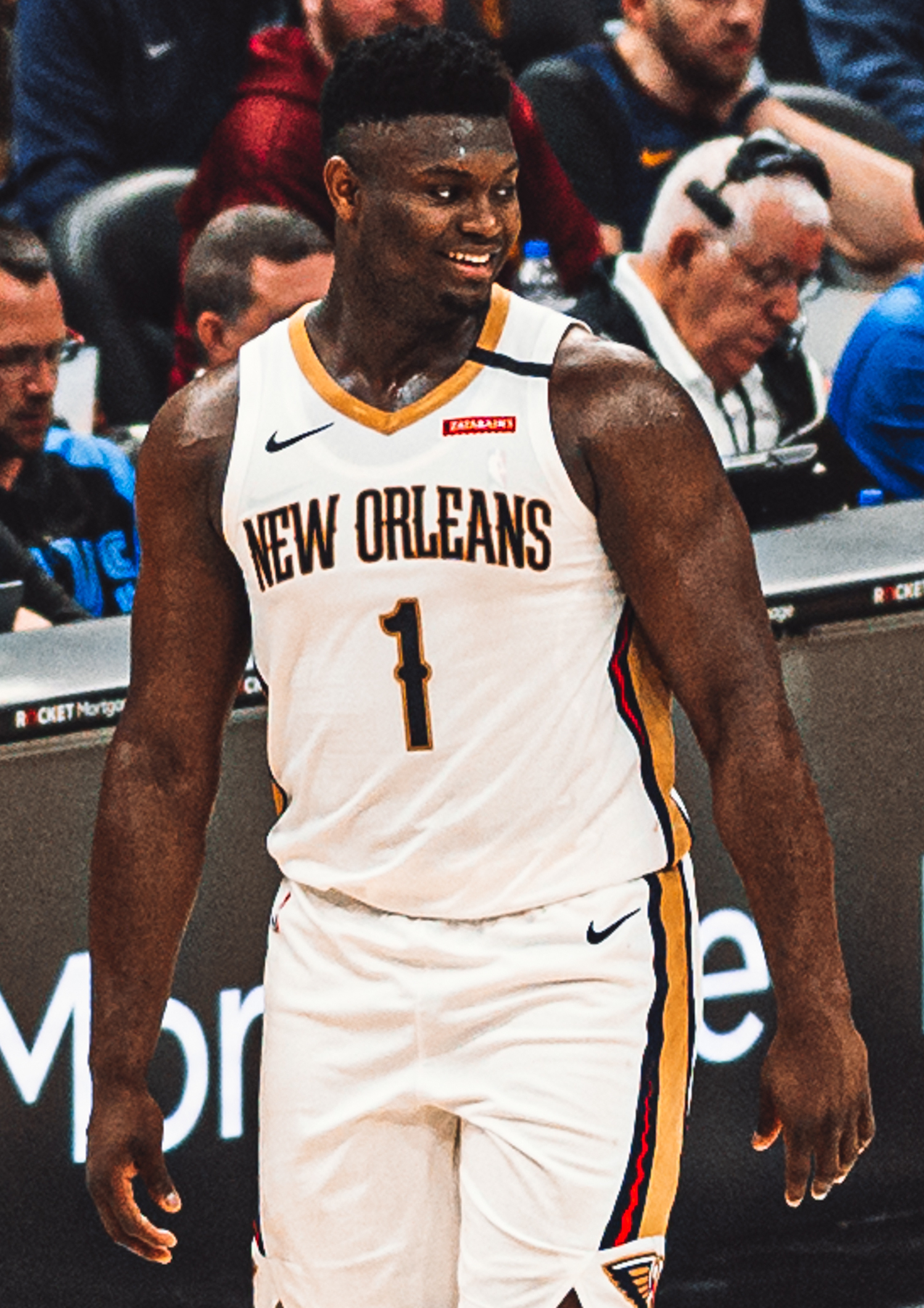
- Williamson with the New Orleans Pelicans in 2020

No. 1 – New Orleans Pelicans
- Position: Power forward
- League: NBA

Personal information
- Born: July 6, 2000 (age 26) Salisbury, North Carolina, U.S.
- Listed height: 6 ft 6 in (1.98 m)
- Listed weight: 277 lb (126 kg)

Career information
- High school: Spartanburg Day (Spartanburg, South Carolina)
- College: Duke (2018–2019)
- NBA draft: 2019: 1st round, 1st overall pick
- Drafted by: New Orleans Pelicans
- Playing career: 2019–present

Career history
- 2019–present: New Orleans Pelicans

Career highlights
- 2× NBA All-Star (2021, 2023); NBA All-Rookie First Team (2020); National college player of the year (2019); Consensus first-team All-American (2019); Wayman Tisdale Award (2019); Karl Malone Award (2019); NABC Freshman of the Year (2019); ACC Athlete of the Year (2019); ACC Player of the Year (2019); First-team All-ACC (2019); ACC Rookie of the Year (2019); ACC All-Freshman team (2019); ACC tournament MVP (2019); McDonald's All-American (2018); South Carolina Mr. Basketball (2018)
- Stats at NBA.com
- Stats at Basketball Reference

Zion Lateef Williamson (born July 6, 2000) is an American professional basketball player for the New Orleans Pelicans of the National Basketball Association (NBA). He plays the power forward position. Following a freshman-year stint with the Duke Blue Devils, Williamson was selected by the Pelicans with the first overall pick in the 2019 NBA draft. He was named to the NBA All-Rookie First Team in 2020. In 2021, he became the fourth youngest NBA player to be selected to an All-Star game. Injuries have curtailed his subsequent NBA seasons.

Williamson attended Spartanburg Day School, where he was a consensus five-star recruit and was ranked among the top five players in the 2018 class. He led his team to three straight state championships and earned South Carolina Mr. Basketball recognition in his senior season. Williamson also left high school as a McDonald's All-American, runner-up for Mr. Basketball USA, and USA Today All-USA first team honoree. In high school, he drew national attention for his slam dunks.

In his freshman and only season with Duke, Williamson was named ACC Player of the Year, ACC Athlete of the Year and ACC Rookie of the Year. He set the single-game school scoring record for freshmen in January 2019, claimed ACC Rookie of the Week accolades five times, earned AP Player of the Year, Sporting News College Player of the Year recognition, and won the Wayman Tisdale Award.

== Early life ==
On July 6, 2000, Williamson was born in Salisbury, North Carolina to Lateef Williamson and Sharonda Sampson. Lateef Williamson was a football defensive lineman at Mayo High School in Darlington, South Carolina, who was a High School All-American in 1993 and had committed to NC State before transferring to Livingstone College. Sampson was a sprinter at Livingstone and became a middle school health and physical education teacher. She named Williamson after the biblical location Mount Zion near Jerusalem, taking her grandmother's advice to name him "something extra special." When Williamson reached two years of age, following the death of his maternal grandmother, his family moved to Florence, South Carolina. By the time he was five years old, his parents had divorced. His mother later married Lee Anderson, a former Clemson college basketball player. In 2022, Williamson visited a church in New Orleans with his family.

Besides basketball, Williamson played soccer and the quarterback position in football. When he was five years old, he set sights on becoming a college basketball star. At age nine, Williamson began waking up every morning at 5 a.m. to train. He competed in youth leagues with his mother Sharonda Sampson coaching and played for the Sumter Falcons on the Amateur Athletic Union (AAU) circuit, facing opponents four years older than he was. Williamson later began working with his stepfather to improve his skills as a point guard. He joined the basketball team at Johnakin Middle School in Marion, South Carolina, where he was again coached by his mother and averaged 20 points per game. In middle school, Williamson was a point guard and lost only three games in two years. In 2013, he guided Johnakin to an 8–1 record and a conference title.

== High school career ==
=== Freshman and sophomore seasons ===
Williamson attended Spartanburg Day School, a small K–12 private school in Spartanburg, South Carolina, where he played basketball for the Griffins. Between eighth and ninth grade, he grew from 5 ft 9 in (1.75 m) to 6 ft 3 in (1.91 m). In the summer leading up to his first season, Williamson practiced in the school gym and developed the ability to dunk. At the time, he competed for the South Carolina Hornets AAU team as well, where he was teammates with Ja Morant. As a freshman, Williamson averaged 24.4 points, 9.4 rebounds, 2.8 assists, 3.3 steals and 3.0 blocks, earning All-State and All-Region honors. He also led Spartanburg Day to a South Carolina Independent School Association (SCISA) state championship game appearance. In March 2015, Williamson took part in the SCISA North-South All-Star Game in Sumter, South Carolina. By his second year in high school, he stood 6 ft 6 in (1.98 m). In his sophomore season, Williamson averaged 28.3 points, 10.4 rebounds, 3.9 blocks, and 2.7 steals per game and was named SCISA Region I-2A Player of the Year. He led the Griffins to their first SCISA Region I-2A title in program history. In June 2016, Williamson participated in the National Basketball Players Association (NBPA) Top 100 camp and was its leading scorer. In August, he won the Under Armour Elite 24 showcase dunk contest in New York City.

=== Junior season ===
As a junior, Williamson averaged 36.8 points, 13 rebounds, 3 steals, and 2.5 blocks per game. Starting in the 2016–17 season, Williamson was propelled into the national spotlight for his viral highlight videos. In a 73–53 victory over Gray Collegiate Academy at the Chick-fil-A Classic on December 21, he posted a tournament-record 53 points and 16 rebounds, shooting 25-of-28 from the field. On December 30, Williamson recorded 31 points and 14 rebounds to win most valuable player (MVP) at the Farm Bureau Insurance Classic. On January 15, 2017, he received nationwide publicity after rapper Drake wore his jersey in an Instagram post.

Williamson surpassed the 2,000-point barrier on January 20, when he tallied 48 points against Oakbrook Preparatory School. On February 14, he led Spartanburg Day past Oakbrook Prep for their first SCISA Region I-2A title, chipping in a game-high 37 points in a 105–49 rout. Williamson broke the state record for most 30-point games in a season, with 27 by the end of the regular season. He repeated as SCISA Region I-2A Player of the Year. High school sports website MaxPreps named him National Junior of the Year and to the High School All-American first team, while USA Today High School Sports gave him All-USA first team recognition. In June, he appeared on the cover of basketball magazine Slam.

=== Senior season ===
In his senior season, Williamson averaged 36.4 points, 11.4 rebounds and 3.5 assists per game. On January 13, 2018, in a nationally televised game at the Hoophall Classic, he scored 36 points as his team lost to Chino Hills High School. On February 17, he posted 37 points, 10 rebounds, and 5 steals, while scoring his 3,000th career point, versus Spartanburg Christian Academy at the SCISA Region I-2A tournament. One week later, Williamson guided Spartanburg Day to its third consecutive SCISA Region I-2A championship after recording 38 points against Trinity Collegiate School.

On March 28, Williamson played in the 2018 McDonald's All-American Game, where he scored 8 points in 17 minutes before leaving with a thumb injury. The injury also forced him to miss the Jordan Brand Classic and Nike Hoop Summit in the following month. For his 2017–18 high school season, Williamson was named to the USA Today All-USA first team and MaxPreps All-American second team. He additionally earned South Carolina Mr. Basketball recognition and was runner-up for Mr. Basketball USA.

=== Recruiting ===
Wofford offered Williamson his first college basketball scholarship when he was a freshman in high school. By the end of his sophomore season, he had received offers from 16 NCAA Division I programs, including Clemson, Florida, and South Carolina. On August 30, 2016, he received a scholarship offer from Duke. Entering his junior season, he was a consensus five-star recruit and was ranked the number one player in the 2018 class by recruiting service 247Sports.

In a live ESPN telecast on January 20, 2018, Williamson committed to Duke. He explained the decision, stating: "Duke stood out because the brotherhood represents a family. (Mike Krzyzewski) is just the most legendary coach that ever coached college basketball. I feel like going to Duke University, I can learn a lot from him." Duke, who had landed RJ Barrett and Cam Reddish in addition to Williamson, became the first team to land the top three recruits in a class since modern recruiting rankings began. Williamson's stepfather, Lee Anderson, remarked that Clemson lost a "mile-and-a-half lead" in recruiting Williamson.

College recruiting
Name	Hometown	School	Height	Weight	Commit date
Zion Williamson; PF	Spartanburg, SC	Spartanburg Day School (SC)	6 ft 6 in (1.98 m)	272 lb (123 kg)	Jan 20, 2018
Zion Williamson; PF	Recruit ratings: Rivals: 247Sports: ESPN: (96)				
Overall recruit ranking: Rivals: 5 247Sports: 7 ESPN: 2
Note: In many cases, Scout, Rivals, 247Sports, On3, and ESPN may conflict in their listings of height and weight.; In these cases, the average was taken. ESPN grades are on a 100-point scale.; Sources: "Duke 2018 Basketball Commitments". Rivals.; "2018 Duke Blue Devils Recruiting Class". ESPN.; "2018 Team Ranking". Rivals.

== College career ==
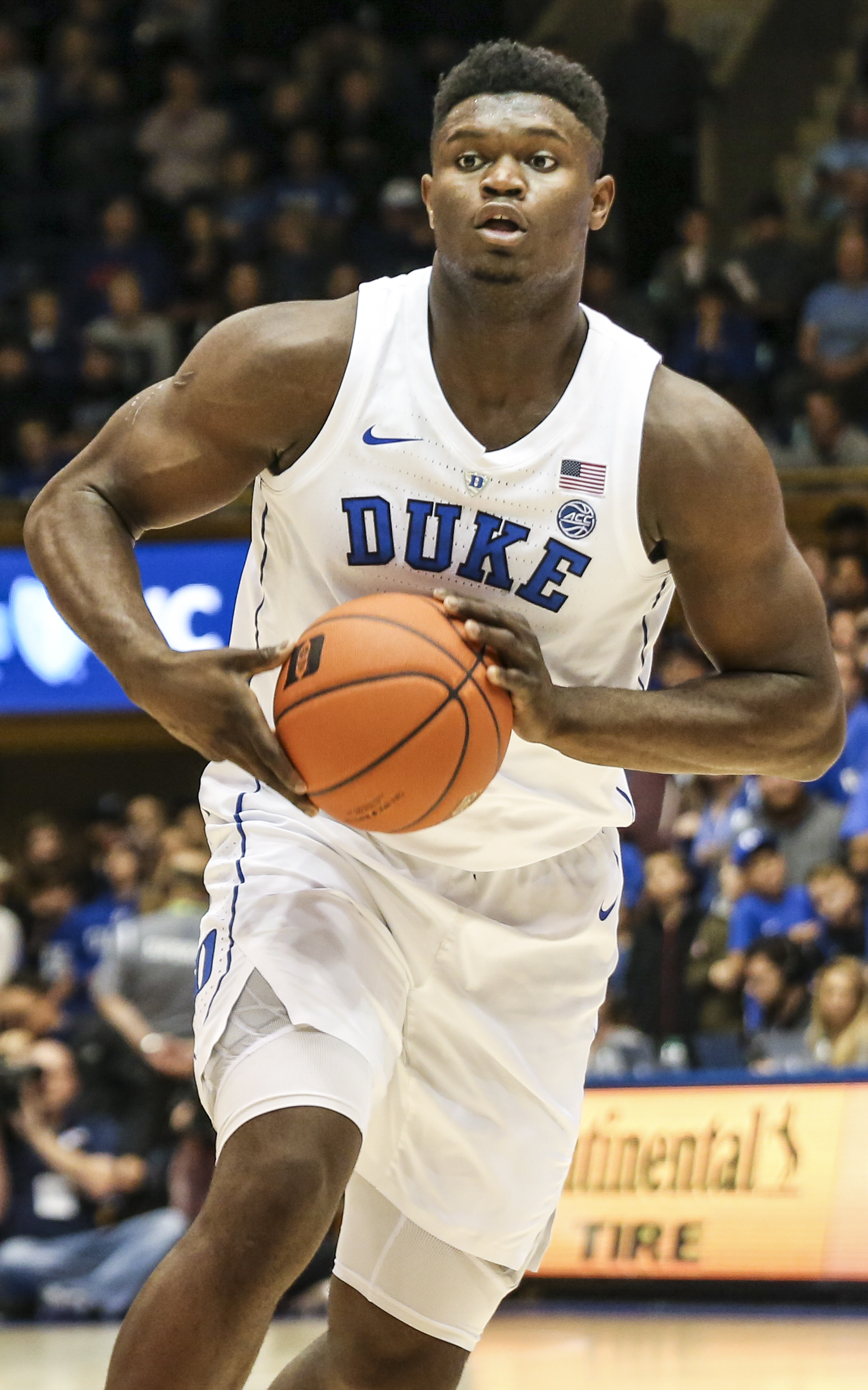
Williamson with Duke in December 2018

On November 6, 2018, in his first regular season game with Duke, Williamson scored 28 points on 11-of-13 shooting in 23 minutes in a 118–84 win over Kentucky at the Champions Classic. In that game, he and teammate RJ Barrett each broke the Duke freshman debut scoring record set by Marvin Bagley III. In his following game, a 94–72 victory over Army, Williamson tallied 27 points, 16 rebounds, and six blocks. He became the second player in school history to record at least 25 points, 15 rebounds, and 5 blocks in a game. Williamson was subsequently named both player and freshman of the week in the Atlantic Coast Conference (ACC).

On January 5, 2019, he had another strong performance versus Clemson, with 25 points, 10 rebounds, and a 360-degree dunk in 22 minutes. Two days later, Williamson earned ACC Freshman of the Week honors for a second time. On January 12, against Florida State, he was poked in the left eye by an opposing player towards the second half and missed the remainder of the game. Williamson returned in Duke's next game, a 95–91 overtime loss to Syracuse, and erupted for 35 points, 10 rebounds, and 4 blocks. He eclipsed the Duke freshman record for single-game points previously held by Marvin Bagley III and JJ Redick. On January 21, Williamson collected his third ACC Freshman of the Week accolade. One week later, he scored 26 points and grabbed 9 rebounds in an 81–63 victory over Notre Dame. By recording nine 25-point games in the season, Williamson set a new Duke freshman record. On February 4, 2019, Williamson was named ACC Freshman of the Week on his fourth occasion, while earning a National Player of the Week distinction from the Naismith Trophy. He had his third 30-point game of the season on February 16, scoring 32 points in a 94–78 victory over NC State. The performance helped him claim his second ACC Player of the Week and fifth ACC Freshman of the Week accolades.

Williamson out with knee injury in February 2019
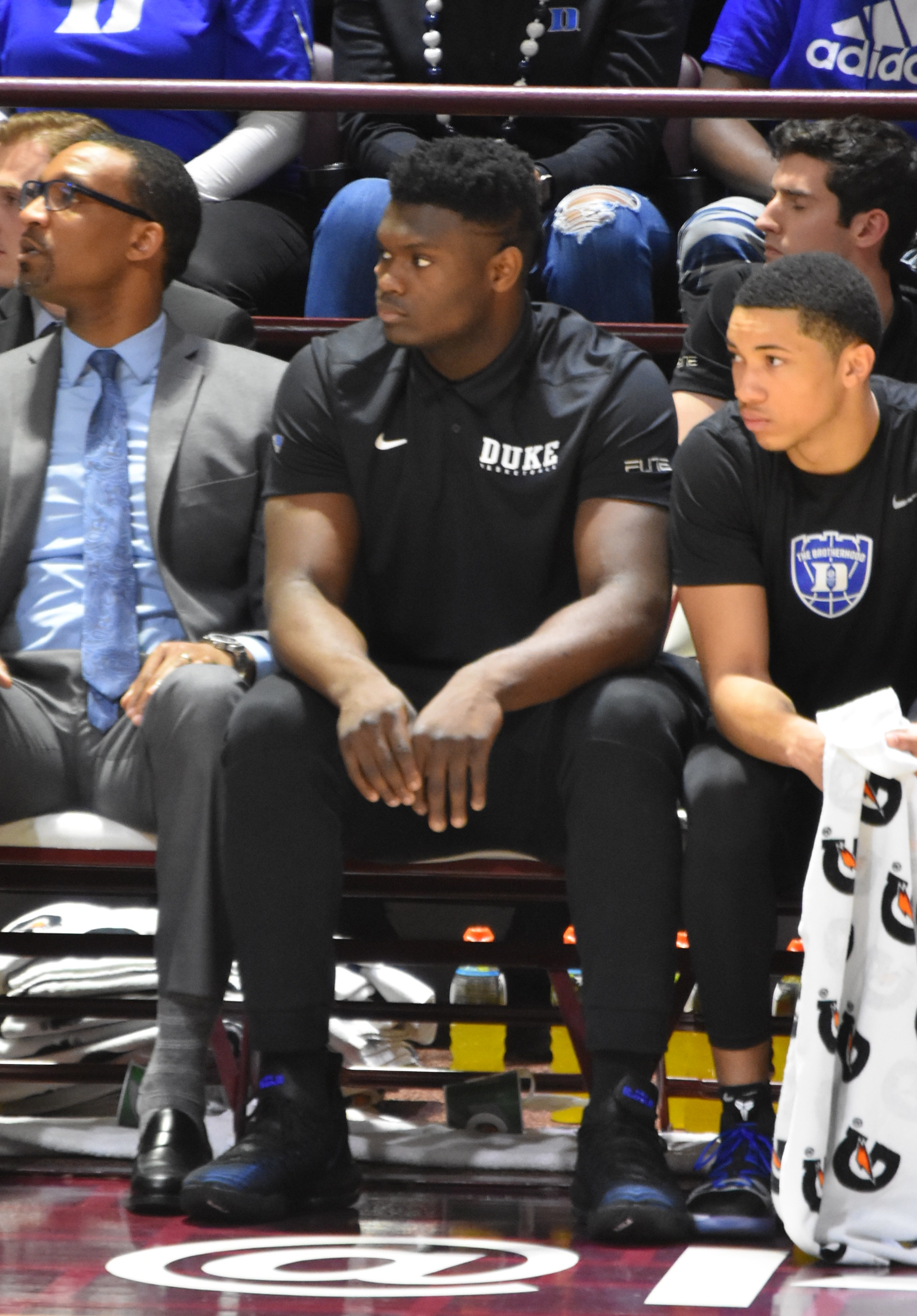
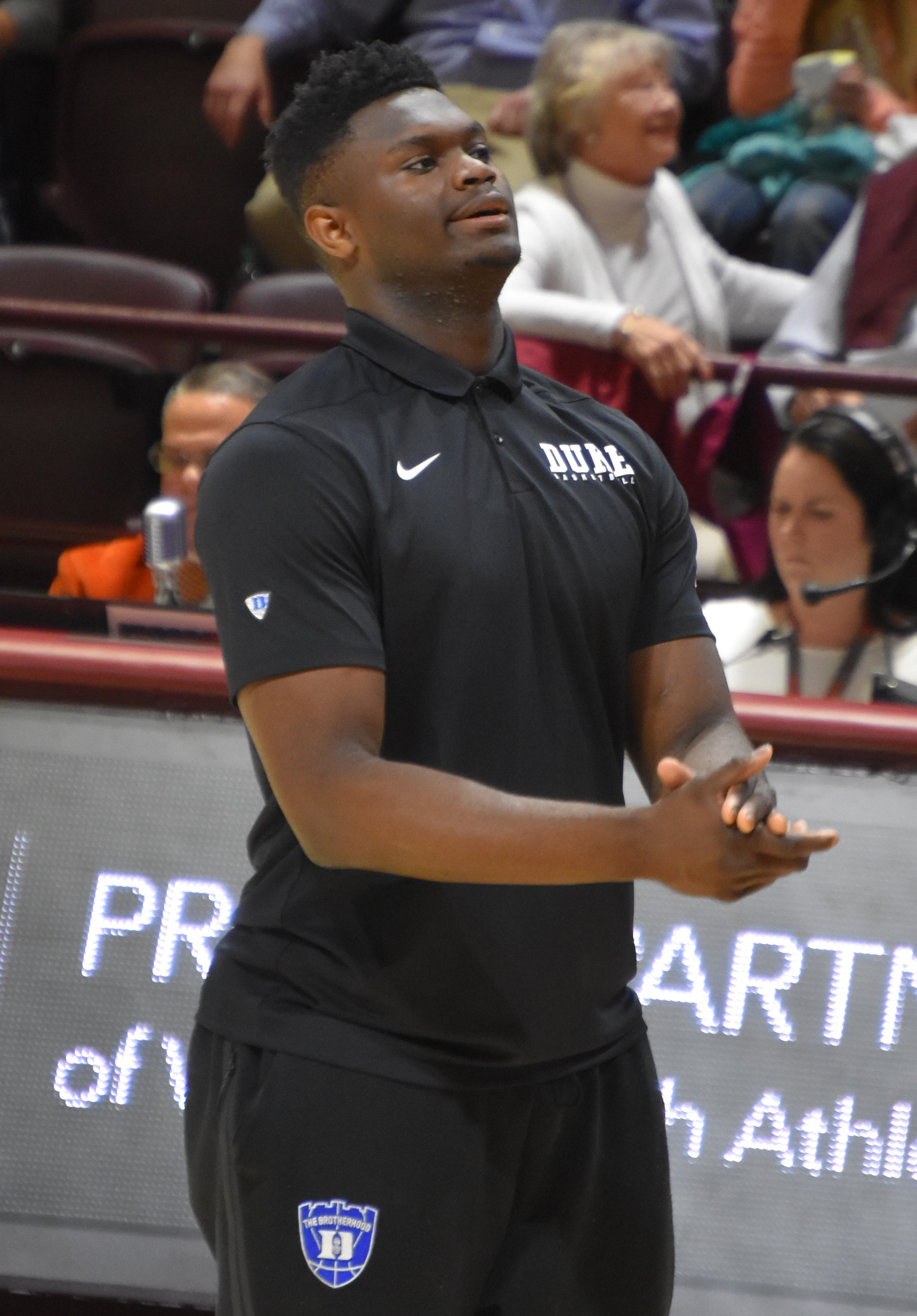
Williamson sits on the bench during a game versus Virginia Tech with an injury suffered from a broken shoe. He walks on the court during a media timeout.

In a February 20 game versus North Carolina, Williamson suffered a Grade 1 knee sprain 36 seconds into the contest after his foot ripped through his Nike shoe, causing him to slip. He did not return to the game, which Duke lost, 88–72. Nike saw the value of its stock drop by $1.1 billion the following day as a result of the incident. The injury resulted in criticism of the NCAA for not paying student-athletes. Williamson was held out from the final six games of the regular season. When the regular season concluded, Williamson earned Player of the Year and Rookie of the Year honors in the ACC, joining former Duke players Jahlil Okafor and Marvin Bagley III as the only recipients of both awards. Williamson was also named ACC Athlete of the Year, becoming the 10th Duke player to win the Award. He additionally made the ACC All-Defensive and All-Freshman teams. Sporting News named Williamson as its Player of the Year and Freshman of the Year.

Williamson returned from injury on March 14, posting 29 points, 14 rebounds, and 5 steals in an 84–72 win over Syracuse in the quarterfinals of the ACC tournament. He shot 13-of-13 from the field, marking the best shooting performance in school and tournament history, while tying the record for the best shooting performance in ACC history. Williamson also became the first Duke player to record at least 25 points, 10 rebounds, and 5 steals in a game since Christian Laettner did so in 1992. The next day, he scored 31 points (including the game-winning shot) to help Duke defeat North Carolina, 74–73, in the ACC Tournament semifinals. After posting 21 points in a 73–63 victory over Florida State in the championship game, Williamson was named ACC Tournament MVP, becoming the sixth freshman to win the honor.

For the 2019 NCAA tournament, official broadcast partner CBS specifically devoted a camera—called the "Zion Cam"—to record Williamson throughout the tournament. In his NCAA Tournament debut on March 22, he scored 25 points in an 85–62 win over 16th-seeded North Dakota State. On March 24, Williamson erupted for 32 points, 11 rebounds, and four assists in a 77–76 second-round victory over UCF. Williamson led all scorers on March 31, with 24 points and 14 rebounds in a season-ending 68–67 loss to Michigan State in the Elite 8. In 33 appearances in his freshman season, he averaged 22.6 points, 8.9 rebounds, 2.1 steals, and 1.8 blocks per game. He shot 68% from the field, which led the ACC, ranked second in the NCAA Division I, and was the highest-ever field goal percentage by a freshman. In addition, Williamson joined Kevin Durant and Anthony Davis as one of the only freshmen in history to collect 500 points, 50 steals, and 50 blocks in a season.

On April 15, 2019, Williamson declared his eligibility for the 2019 NBA draft.

== Professional career ==
=== New Orleans Pelicans (2019–present) ===
==== 2019–20 season: All-Rookie honors ====
On June 20, 2019, the New Orleans Pelicans drafted Williamson with the first pick in the 2019 NBA draft. On July 1, 2019, Williamson officially signed with the Pelicans. Williamson tore his meniscus on October 13, 2019, during the preseason of his rookie campaign. Williamson made his professional debut three months later on January 22, 2020, in a 121–117 loss to the San Antonio Spurs. He played 18 minutes and finished with 22 points and 7 rebounds, scoring 17 consecutive points in 3:08 minutes during the fourth quarter.

In his first eight games, Williamson scored at least 20 points in four consecutive games, the longest streak by any rookie of the season; he also tied the longest streak in the Pelicans franchise history, scoring at least 20 points in six of his eight games, and tying the record for the seventh-most among all rookies (fellow rookie Ja Morant had the most with 19) after a 125–119 win over the Chicago Bulls on February 7. On February 24, he led the Pelicans to a 115–101 win over the Golden State Warriors. With 28 points on 13/20 shooting in a season-high 33 minutes of play, Williamson was just one game behind Carmelo Anthony for most consecutive 20-point games as a teenager at 8. He would later become the first teenager in NBA history to score at least 20 points in 10 consecutive games. On March 1, Williamson scored then career-high 35 points, along with 7 rebounds, in a 122–114 loss to the Los Angeles Lakers.

Williamson finished his rookie season averaging 22.5 points on 58.3 percent shooting from the floor, 6.3 rebounds, and 2.1 assists per game. He ranked first among all rookies in points per game, second in rebounds per game and first in offensive rebounds per game. He became the first rookie since Michael Jordan to post 16 20-point games within their first 20 contests while also logging the highest scoring average through his first 24 career NBA games since Jordan in 1983. On September 15, Williamson was named to the NBA All-Rookie First Team.

==== 2020–21 season: First All-Star selection ====
On February 12, 2021, Williamson scored a then career high 36 points in a 143–130 defeat against the Dallas Mavericks; he finished the game on 14-of-15 shooting from the field, making him the youngest player in NBA history with 30 points on 90 percent shooting. On February 23, 2021, Williamson was selected into his first NBA All-Star Game. On March 21, 2021, Williamson scored 30 points and 6 rebounds in a 113–108 win over the Denver Nuggets.

During the season, Williamson tied Kareem Abdul-Jabbar's record for the longest streak of at least 20-point games on 50-percent shooting within his first two seasons since the shot clock era in 1954–55. The streak eventually grew to 25 consecutive games, surpassing Hall-of-Famers Wilt Chamberlain and Karl Malone while tying Shaquille O'Neal's record of 25 consecutive such games, with no other player having had a longer streak since the three-point era in 1980; his streak of 20-points games on 50-percent shooting and attempt to surpass O'Neal's record ended in a 139–111 loss to the Brooklyn Nets on April 7.

==== 2021–22 season: Surgery and year absence ====
During the off-season, Williamson suffered a Jones fracture in his right foot and underwent a subsequent surgery. In late-September, team officials were hopeful that he would be ready to return by the start of the season. By mid-October, the timeline for his expected return was extended until December. In mid-December, it was announced that the injury was slow to heal and he would most likely be out another four to six weeks with a possible return to action around the all-star break. In mid-March, it was announced that Williamson would not play that season.

==== 2022–23 season: Contract extension and season-ending injury ====
On July 6, 2022, Williamson signed a five-year rookie extension with the New Orleans Pelicans worth $193 million guaranteed, increasing to $231 million if he made an All-NBA team in the 2022–2023 season. Williamson made his return from injury on October 4, 2022, putting up 13 points, four rebounds, one assist, and one steal in a 129–125 preseason win over the Chicago Bulls.

On October 19, Williamson made his regular season return, putting up 25 points, nine rebounds, three assists, and four steals in a 130–108 win over the Brooklyn Nets. On December 2, Williamson scored 30 points and matched career highs with 15 rebounds and eight assists in an 117–99 win over the San Antonio Spurs. On December 9, Zion put up a then season-high 35 points, along with seven rebounds, four steals, and one block in a 126–117 win against the Phoenix Suns. A final dunk he made in the last seconds of the game caused an altercation between the Pelicans and Suns. On December 12, Williamson was named the NBA Western Conference Player of the Week for Week 8 (December 5–11), his first NBA Player of the Week award. He led New Orleans to an undefeated 3–0 week with averages of 33.0 points and 8.3 rebounds on 70.4% shooting from the field. On December 28, Williamson put up a career-high 43 points in a 119–118 win over the Minnesota Timberwolves. Williamson was sidelined on January 2, 2023, with a hamstring injury. At first, team officials were hopeful that he would be ready to return by the end of January. On January 26, 2023, Williamson was selected for his second NBA All-Star appearance. However, due to his unavailability, Williamson was replaced by Anthony Edwards. On February 13, team officials indicated that Williamson would miss multiple weeks after the All-Star break. Subsequently, team officials confirmed in early April that Williamson would miss the remainder of the regular season. Subsequently, Williamson sat out the Pelicans appearance in their play-in game against the Oklahoma City Thunder, which New Orleans lost, ending their season.

==== 2023–24 season: Return from injury ====
On November 29, 2023, Williamson recorded 33 points on 11-of-12 shooting from the field, 11-of-12 from the free throw line along with eight rebounds, six assists, and three steals in a 124–114 win over the Philadelphia 76ers. On February 2, 2024, Williamson put up 33 points, eight rebounds, and a game-winning layup in a 114–113 win over the San Antonio Spurs. On April 16, Williamson in his first play-in appearance scored 40 points, grabbed 11 rebounds and dished out 5 assists in a 110–106 loss against the Los Angeles Lakers. His NBA postseason debut was cut short by an injury in the final minutes of the game.

==== 2024–25 season: Further struggles with injuries ====
Though Williamson was healthy to begin the regular season, he sustained an early season left hamstring strain which caused him to miss 27 games. He made his return from injury on January 8, 2025, scoring 22 points in just under 28 minutes in a 104–97 loss to the Timberwolves. On January 10, the team suspended him for one game due to being late for a team flight. Pelicans head coach Willie Green stated "There were several occasions that led up" to Williamson's suspension. On February 27, Williamson put up his first career triple-double with 27 points, a then career-high 11 assists, and 10 rebounds in a 124–116 win over the Phoenix Suns. On March 11, he put up another triple-double, recording 22 points, a career-high 12 assists, and 10 rebounds in a 127–120 win over the Los Angeles Clippers. On March 19, he sustained a bone contusion in his lower back, ending his season at just 30 games played.

==== 2025–26 season: Return to health ====
Williamson appeared in 62 games during the 2025–26 NBA season, averaging 21.0 points, 5.7 rebounds, and 3.2 assists per game while shooting 60.0% from the field. Despite his improved availability, the Pelicans finished with a 26–56 record and failed to qualify for the NBA playoffs.

== Player profile ==
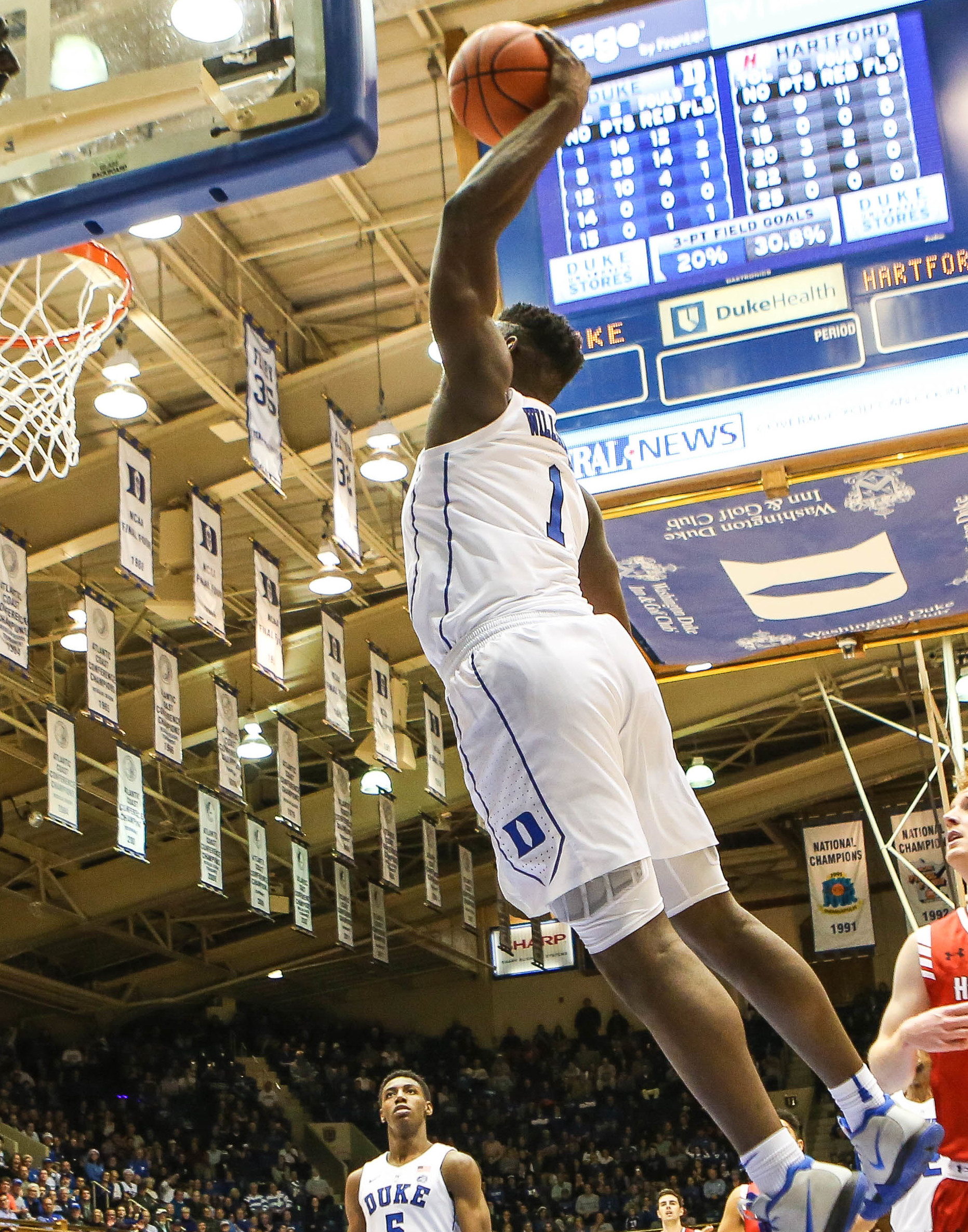
Williamson goes in for a slam dunk against Hartford, December 2018

Williamson is listed at 6 ft 6 in (1.98 m) tall and weighs 284 pounds (129 kg). Despite his heavy weight for a basketball player, he is known for his speed and leaping ability. NBA player Kevin Durant described him as a "once-in-a-generation type athlete" while an anonymous college basketball coach labeled him a "freak of nature." Williamson plays the power forward position but is also capable of being a small-ball center. He has been described as not fitting a specific basketball position. His physical attributes have drawn comparisons to former NBA stars Charles Barkley, Anthony Mason, and Larry Johnson. In addition, according to different analysts, he resembles NBA players LeBron James and Julius Randle. Lee Sartor, Williamson's high school coach, reported that basketball coach Roy Williams told Williamson "that he was probably one of the best high school players he's seen since Michael Jordan." Williamson, who is left-handed, is almost ambidextrous.

While in high school, Williamson drew national attention for his slam dunks. The Charlotte Observer remarked that he "could be the best high-school dunker in history." NBA point guard John Wall has likened Williamson's in-game dunking ability to that of Vince Carter. Williamson's outside shooting has been considered a point of concern, and he has unorthodox shot mechanics. Recruiting service 247Sports has praised his ball handling and passing skills for his size, commenting that they are "overshadowed by [his] athletic plays." Williamson has the ability to defend multiple positions well due to his speed and length, although his defensive effort has been questioned. He is a skilled shot-blocker and rebounder.

At various points during his NBA career, Williamson has received criticism in the media from basketball observers who perceive him to be overweight. Prior to the start of the 2021–2022 season, Williamson's weight increased to over 300 lbs. Williamson lost weight in 2022. In 2023, however, retired basketball players Charles Barkley and Shaquille O'Neal each expressed concerns about Williamson's weight. Williamson's 2022 contract extension with the New Orleans Pelicans provides for salary reductions in the event that Williamson fails to maintain his weight and body fat percentage at specified levels.

Since the inaugural In-Season Tournament during the 2023 season, Williamson has seen significant improvements to his physique, losing 25 lbs.

== Endorsements ==
On July 23, 2019, Williamson signed a five-year, $75 million shoe deal with Jordan brand. Williamson's deal is the second-largest rookie shoe deal in history, trailing only LeBron James's $90 million rookie deal signed in 2003.

== Charitable endeavors ==
On March 13, 2020, Williamson pledged to pay the salaries of all the employees of the Smoothie King Center for 30 days during the suspension of the 2019–20 NBA season, which was caused by the COVID-19 pandemic. He was one of several basketball players to help the arena workers.

== Career statistics ==
Legend
GP	Games played	GS	Games started	MPG	Minutes per game
FG%	Field goal percentage	3P%	3-point field goal percentage	FT%	Free throw percentage
RPG	Rebounds per game	APG	Assists per game	SPG	Steals per game
BPG	Blocks per game	PPG	Points per game	**Bold**	Career high

=== NBA ===
Year	Team	GP	GS	MPG	FG%	3P%	FT%	RPG	APG	SPG	BPG	PPG
2019–20	New Orleans	24	24	27.8	.583	**.429**	.640	6.3	2.1	.7	.4	22.5
2020–21	New Orleans	61	61	**33.2**	**.611**	.294	.698	**7.2**	3.7	.9	.6	**27.0**
2022–23	New Orleans	29	29	33.0	.608	.368	.714	7.0	4.6	1.1	.6	26.0
2023–24	New Orleans	**70**	**70**	31.5	.570	.333	.702	5.8	5.0	1.1	.7	22.9
2024–25	New Orleans	30	30	28.6	.567	.231	.656	**7.2**	**5.3**	**1.2**	**.9**	24.6
2025–26	New Orleans	62	55	29.7	.600	.250	**.716**	5.7	3.2	1.0	.5	21.0
Career		276	269	31.0	.591	.324	.695	6.4	4.1	1.0	.6	23.8
All-Star		1	1	14.4	.556	—	—	1.0	.0	.0	.0	10.0

=== College ===
Year	Team	GP	GS	MPG	FG%	3P%	FT%	RPG	APG	SPG	BPG	PPG
2018–19	Duke	33	33	30.0	.680	.338	.640	8.9	2.1	2.1	1.8	22.6

== Personal life ==
In June 2023, Williamson announced his girlfriend's pregnancy in a baby shower YouTube video with the couple expecting a daughter due in November. This announcement led adult film star Moriah Mills to claim on Twitter that she had a recent affair with Williamson.

On May 30, 2025, Williamson was accused of rape and domestic violence in a civil lawsuit filed by a woman who claimed to have dated him for five years. Williamson allegedly forced her to sleep with him, filmed her without her consent and threatened to spread the photos if she left, and threatened to have his security shoot her and her family.

Williamson is a fan of anime/manga, stating that his favorite anime/manga is Naruto. According to Williamson, his All-NBA starting five of Naruto characters are Naruto Uzumaki, Itachi Uchiha, Minato Namikaze, Jiraiya, and the First Hokage, Hashirama Senju. He even has a shoe collaboration with the series, due to his love for it, as well as a ‘Naruto’ Air Jordan 1 Utility Prototype as a part of his shoe brand, that was never released.

== See also ==
- List of NBA career field goal percentage leaders
