= 2018 McDonald's All-American Boys Game =

American high school basketball game

| East | West |
|---|---|
| 128 | 131 |
| | 1st half | 2nd half | Total |
|---|---|---|---|
| East | 63 | 65 | 128 |
| West | 54 | 77 | 131 |
- Date: March 28, 2018
- Venue: Philips Arena, Atlanta, Georgia
- MVP: Nassir Little
- Referees: Patrick Rock, Jody Cantrell, Greg Norton
- Attendance: 11,249
- Network: ESPN2

McDonald's All-American

The 2018 McDonald's All-American Boys Game was an All-star basketball game that was played on Wednesday, March 28, 2018, at the Philips Arena in Atlanta, Georgia, home of the Atlanta Hawks. The game's rosters featured the best and most highly recruited high school boys graduating in 2018. The game is the 41st annual version of the McDonald's All-American Game first played in 1977.

The 24 players were selected from 2,500 nominees by a committee of basketball experts. They were chosen not only for their on-court skills but for their performances off the court as well. Coach Morgan Wootten, who had more than 1,200 wins as head basketball coach at DeMatha Catholic High School, was chairman of the selection committee.

== Rosters ==
When the rosters were announced on January 16, 2018, Duke, Kansas and Kentucky had three selectees, while Oregon, North Carolina, and Vanderbilt each had two. At the announcement of roster selections, only 10 schools were represented and had 6 players uncommitted. On Jan. 20, Zion Williamson committed to Duke, giving them four selections which gave them most of any school. On Jan. 22, Moses Brown committed to UCLA which brought the total number of schools to 11. John Mirabello (Northwest Catholic High School, West Hartford, Conn.) and Brad Lauwers (A.J. Dimond High School, Anchorage, Alaska) coached the East and West teams, respectively.

=== Team East ===
| ESPN 100 Rank | Name | Height (ft-in) | Weight (lbs) | Position | Hometown | High school | College choice |
|---|---|---|---|---|---|---|---|
| 1 | RJ Barrett | 6–7 | 200 | SF | Mississauga, Ontario | Montverde Academy | Duke |
| 17 | Moses Brown | 7–1 | 241 | C | Briarwood, Queens | Archbishop Molloy High School | UCLA |
| 11 | Darius Garland | 6–2 | 175 | PG | Brentwood, Tennessee | Brentwood Academy | Vanderbilt |
| 21 | Louis King | 6–7 | 204 | SF | Columbus, New Jersey | Hudson Catholic High School | Oregon |
| 5 | Romeo Langford | 6–4 | 195 | SG | New Albany, Indiana | New Albany High School | Indiana |
| 33 | David McCormack | 6–10 | 255 | C | Norfolk, Virginia | Oak Hill Academy | Kansas |
| 31 | E. J. Montgomery | 6–10 | 215 | PF | Marietta, Georgia | Wheeler High School | Kentucky |
| 12 | Immanuel Quickley | 6–3 | 180 | PG | Havre de Grace, Maryland | The John Carroll School | Kentucky |
| 18 | Naz Reid | 6–10 | 240 | PF | Asbury Park, New Jersey | Roselle Catholic High School | LSU |
| 15 | Jalen Smith | 6–9 | 195 | PF | Baltimore, Maryland | Mount Saint Joseph High School | Maryland |
| 25 | Coby White | 6–4 | 165 | PG | Goldsboro, North Carolina | Greenfield High School | North Carolina |
| 2 | Zion Williamson | 6-6 | 272 | PF | Spartanburg, South Carolina | Spartanburg Day School | Duke |

=== Team West ===
| ESPN 100 Rank | Name | Height (ft-in) | Weight (lbs) | Position | Hometown | High school | College choice |
|---|---|---|---|---|---|---|---|
| 9 | Darius Bazley | 6–8 | 195 | PF | Cincinnati, Ohio | Princeton High School (Ohio) | Syracuse^{†} |
| 4 | Bol Bol | 7–2 | 220 | C | Henderson, Nevada | Findlay Prep | Oregon |
| 30 | Jordan Brown | 6–10 | 205 | C | Napa, California | Prolific Prep | Nevada |
| 24 | Devon Dotson | 6–2 | 175 | PG | Charlotte, North Carolina | Providence Day School | Kansas |
| 13 | Quentin Grimes | 6–4 | 204 | SG | The Woodlands, Texas | The Woodlands College Park High School | Kansas |
| 7 | Keldon Johnson | 6–5 | 205 | SF | South Hill, Virginia | Oak Hill Academy | Kentucky |
| 10 | Tre Jones | 6–2 | 183 | PG | Apple Valley, Minnesota | Apple Valley High School | Duke |
| 14 | Nassir Little | 6–7 | 215 | SF | Orange Park, Florida | Orlando Christian Prep | North Carolina |
| 16 | Reggie Perry | 6–8 | 239 | PF | Thomasville, Georgia | Thomasville High School | Mississippi State |
| 23 | Jahvon Quinerly | 6–1 | 160 | PG | Hackensack, New Jersey | Hudson Catholic High School | Villanova |
| 3 | Cam Reddish | 6–8 | 203 | SF | Norristown, Pennsylvania | Westtown School | Duke |
| 6 | Simisola Shittu | 6–9 | 220 | PF | Burlington, Ontario | Vermont Academy | Vanderbilt |

† On March 29, Darius Bazley withdrew from his commitment to Syracuse in order to compete in the NBA G League (via entering his name in the 2018 NBA G League Draft) to prepare for the 2019 NBA draft.

^undecided at the time of roster selection
^{~}undecided at game time

== Box Score ==
ESPN2

March 28, 2018
07:00 pm ET

Box Score

| East | 128–131 | West |
Scoring by half: 63–54, 65–77
| Pts: RJ Barrett (26); Rebs: Naz Reid (11); Asts: Darius Garland (11) | | Pts: Zion Williamson (28); Rebs: Jordan Brown (8); Asts: Cam Reddish (9) |

Philips Arena, Atlanta, GA
