= St. Francis Xavier High School (Sumter, South Carolina) =

Location
- 15 School Street; Sumter, South Carolina 29150; United States; 33°55′9″N 80°21′27″W

Information
- Type: Private
- Motto: Inspiring Minds, Instilling Faith, and Illuminating the Future
- Religious affiliation: Christianity
- Denomination: Roman Catholic
- Established: 1997 (29 years ago)
- Principal: Kristi C. Doyle
- Grades: 9–12
- Gender: Co-educational
- Enrollment: 20
- Student to teacher ratio: 4:1
- Colors: Green, white, and gold
- Mascot: Padre
- Accreditation: South Carolina Independent School Association
- Newspaper: Padre Post
- Affiliation: SACS/AdvancEd, SCISA, NCEA
- Website: www.sfxhs.com

St. Francis Xavier High School was a private, Roman Catholic high school in Sumter, South Carolina, United States. It is run independently of the Roman Catholic Diocese of Charleston. It is now permanently closed.

== Background ==
St. Francis Xavier High School opened in 1997 after only a few months of planning. It opened just months after the announced closing of Sumter Catholic High School in 1997. At its opening the school had 32 students, and five graduated that year.

In 2002, SFXHS began its first capital campaign. This was used to purchase the building it now occupies at 15 School Street in Sumter, and for significant renovations of the heat and air conditioning system.

On December 3, 2000, the Bishop of Charleston, Robert Baker, recognized St. Francis Xavier High School as an independent Catholic high school within the diocese.

In 2020, due to declining enrollment SFXHS closed and Cardinal Newman High School (Columbia, South Carolina) took the remaining students.

== Sports ==
The Padres won the class A SCISA basketball state championship for the 2001-2002 season. They were led by their coach Chris Cocozello in his second season at the helm.
