= Jordan Jones (basketball) =

American basketball player (born 2002)

- Jones in 2026

No. 4 – Bamberg Baskets
- Position: Point guard
- League: Basketball Bundesliga

Personal information
- Born: March 2, 2002 (age 24) Florence, South Carolina, U.S.
- Listed height: 6 ft 1 in (1.85 m)
- Listed weight: 187 lb (85 kg)

Career information
- High school: South Florence (Florence, South Carolina); Trinity Collegiate School (Darlington, South Carolina)
- College: Coker (2020–2023); Central Connecticut (2023–2025)
- NBA draft: 2025: undrafted
- Playing career: 2025–present

Career history
- 2025–2026: Nitra Blue Wings
- 2026–present: Bamberg Baskets

Career highlights
- NEC Player of the Year (2025); First-team All-NEC (2025); Second-team All-NEC (2024)

Jordan Lamont Jones is an American professional basketball player for Bamberg Baskets of the German Basketball Bundesliga (BBL). He played college basketball for the Central Connecticut Blue Devils and the Coker Cobras.

== Early life and high school career ==
Jones began his high school career at South Florence High School. He transferred to Trinity Collegiate School, where he led the team to finish twice runner up for the state championship. During his senior season, Jones had visits lined up with Division I programs but they were cancelled due to the COVID-19 pandemic. As a result, he committed to Division II Coker University.

== College career ==
Jones played sparingly during his freshman season. In his junior season at Coker, Jones averaged 15.6 points and 6.5 assists per game while shooting 48.2 percent from the field. He transferred to Central Connecticut. In his first season as a Blue Devil, Jones averaged 13.1 points, 3.6 assists and 3.5 rebounds per game and was named to the All-Northeast Conference Second Team. He averaged 14.3 points, 3.5 assists, 3.3 rebounds, and 1.5 steals per game as a senior, helping lead the team to a 25-7 record. He was named NEC Player of the Year, becoming the first Central Connecticut player in 14 years to be so honored.

== Professional career ==
On August 12, 2025, Jones signed with Nitra Blue Wings of the Slovak Basketball League.
