= Lee Academy =

Lee Academy can refer to more than one educational institution in the United States:

- Lee Academy (Arkansas), based in Marianna, Lee County, Arkansas.
- Lee Academy (Maine), based in Lee, Maine.
- Lee Academy (Mississippi), based in Clarksdale, Mississippi.
- Lee Academy, based in Bishopville, South Carolina.
