= Hilton Head Preparatory School =

Location
- 8 Fox Grape Road; Hilton Head Island, South Carolina 29928; United States; 32.135684°N 80.77436°W

Information
- Type: Private school
- Established: 1985 (41 years ago)
- CEEB code: 411035
- President: Eric Wojcikiewicz
- Headmaster: Paul Horgan
- Grades: PK–12
- Gender: Co-educational
- Colors: Red, white, blue
- Mascot: Dolphins
- Rivals: Hilton Head Christian Academy, Thomas Heyward Academy, John Paul II (Ridgeland, SC)
- Accreditations: National Association of Independent Schools; Southern Association of Colleges and Schools; Southern Association of Independent Schools
- Publication: Perspectives
- Website: www.hhprep.org

Hilton Head Preparatory School (HHP) is a private school for junior kindergarten through 12th grade, located in Hilton Head Island, South Carolina, United States. It belongs to the South Carolina Independent School Association, and is accredited by the Southern Association of Colleges and Schools and the Southern Association of Independent Schools. It is the only school on Hilton Head Island to be accredited by the National Association of Independent Schools.

== Community ==
Hilton Head Prep is located on Hilton Head Island, which has a population of approximately 40,000. The school is located just inside of the Ocean Gate into Sea Pines Resort.

== History ==
The school was formed in 1985 as a result of the merger of Sea Pines Academy and May River Academy. Both predecessor schools opened in the late 1960s after Beaufort County Schools ended educational segregation and have been cited as examples of segregation academies.

When Sea Pines Academy was established, some of the students lived as far as 50 miles away and were bused to the school so their parents could avoid enrolling them in racially integrated public schools.

== Curriculum ==
The upper school offers 13 Advanced Placement courses. In middle school, students are required to take one semester of P.E. each year if they do not participate in school or club athletics.

== Schedule ==
As of 2015, the upper school day consists of seven 45-minute periods with three minutes between classes, a 20-minute break and a twenty-five-minute lunch. The school day is shortened on Fridays, with 37-minute periods and an extended mid-morning break, but without a lunch break.

== Athletics ==
=== Athletic Department ===
The athletic program at Prep has greater than 75% participation of the student body, with many student-athletes participating in multiple sports.

Athletic facilities include the Joseph B. Fraser Jr. Field House, which was opened in 2007. It is a 20,600 square foot building that includes a multi-functional basketball and volleyball gymnasium, four locker rooms, a wellness center, and an athletic trainer room.

The school's athletic rivals are Hilton Head Christian Academy and Thomas Heyward Academy

=== SCISA championships ===
Hilton Head Prep has won many SCISA championships as a member school of the South Carolina Independent School Association. In the 2015–2016 school year the men's golf team and tennis team captured SCISA championships. This was their third straight tennis title in three years.

== Notable alumni ==
- Michael Haley (1998), former First Gentleman of South Carolina
- Cleeve Harper (2019), tennis player
