= Charleston Collegiate School =

Coordinates: 32°42′39″N 80°3′53″W

- 2024 Academy Drive; Johns Island, South Carolina 29455; United States

Information
- Type: Independent, non-sectarian
- Established: 1970
- Head of school: Andy Gyves
- Faculty: 75
- Grades: PS3-12
- Enrollment: 400
- Campus: 55+ acres
- Colors: Blue and gold
- Mascot: Sun Devil
- Accreditations: Southern Association of Independent Schools, SACS Southern Association of Colleges and Schools, NAIS National Association of Independent Schools
- Website: Official website

Charleston Collegiate School (formerly Sea Island Academy) is a co-educational, nonsectarian, independent day school in Johns Island, South Carolina, United States near the city of Charleston. It was founded in 1970 under the name Sea Island Academy and in 2002 became Charleston Collegiate School. It is known for its outdoor education center and project based learning curriculum.

== History ==
The school was originally organized in 1970 as a rural segregation academy on a sea island near Charleston, South Carolina with the name Sea Island Academy. When the school first opened, classes were held in a local Episcopal church. In 1971 Sea Island Academy merged with Sea Island Baptist School, founded in 1966 by the First Baptist Church of John's Island.

The school was renamed Charleston Collegiate School in 2002, and presently occupies a 30-acre (120,000 m^{2}) campus, built in 1972.

== Curriculum ==
CCS integrates environmental awareness across different disciplines in its curriculum. This integration includes programs that use the forest which surrounds the school as well as a school garden run on permaculture principles. There is a 100% graduation rate along with 100% college acceptance rate. The curriculum is heavily focused on project based learning.

== Athletics ==
Charleston Collegiate School participates in the South Carolina Independent School Association athletics program. It offers basketball, cheerleading, cross country running, football, tennis, archery, baseball, soccer, and volleyball.

== Student body ==
In 2000, Sea Island Academy started a 90% scholarship program in order to increase minority enrollment. As of 2013 its student body consisted of about 30% minorities. As of 2013, one hundred percent of CCS's graduates were accepted at postsecondary institutions.

== Affiliations ==
Charleston Collegiate School is accredited by the Southern Association of Independent Schools (SAIS) and the Southern Association of Colleges and Schools (SACS). It belongs to the National Association of Independent Schools (NAIS), the South Carolina Independent Schools Association, the Palmetto Association of Independent Schools (PAIS), the National Center for Independent School Renewal (NCISR), the Coalition of Essential Schools (CES), and the Education Records Bureau (ERB).
