= Bishopville High School =

- U.S. National Register of Historic Places
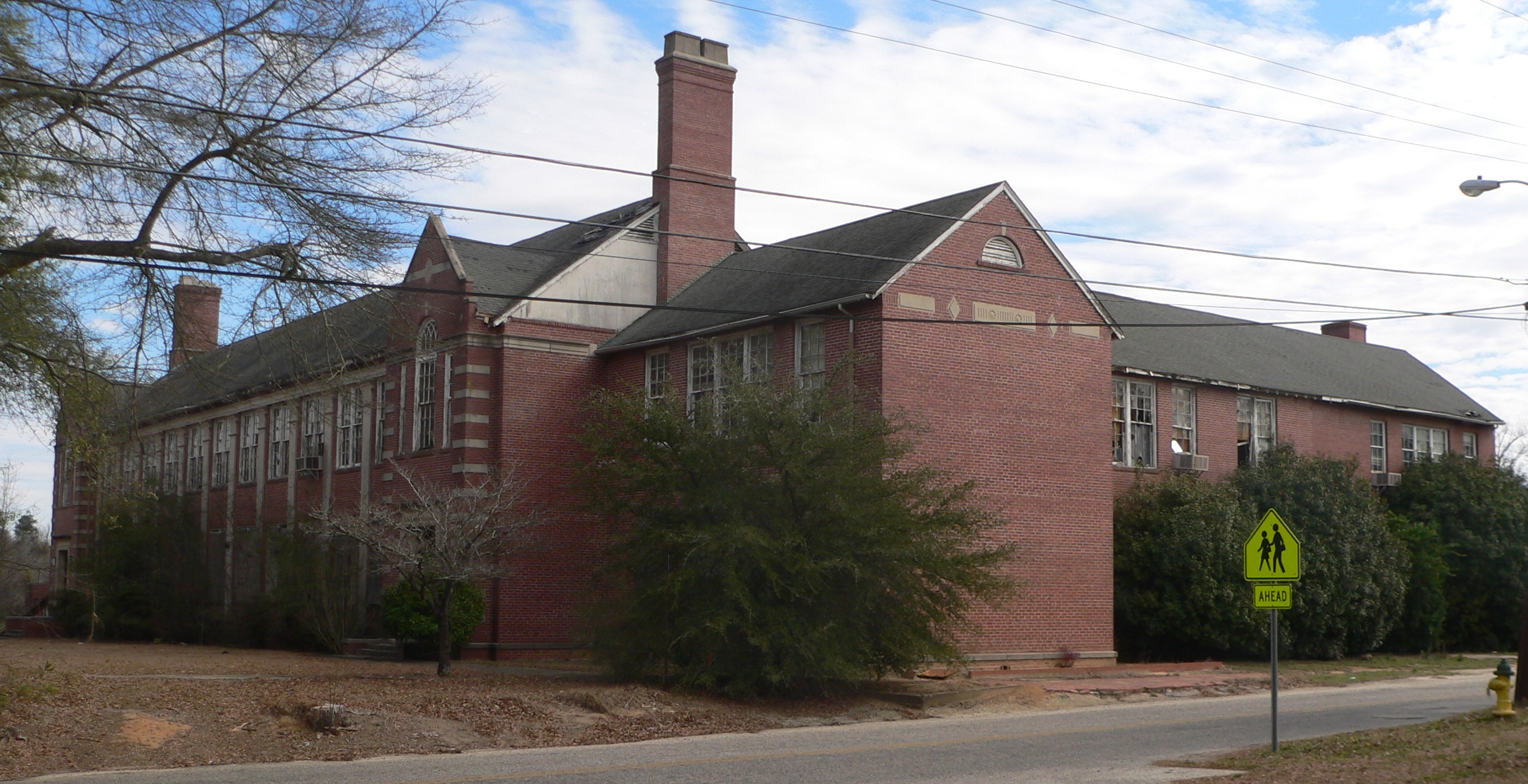
- Bishopville High School, February 2013

- Location within South Carolina Location within the United States
- Location: 600 N. Main St., Bishopville, South Carolina
- Coordinates: 34°13′26″N 80°14′26″W
- Area: 3.3 acres (1.3 ha)
- Built: 1936
- Architect: Harrall, Henry Dudley; Sellers & Hogan
- Architectural style: Colonial Revival
- NRHP reference No.: 04001087
- Added to NRHP: October 1, 2004

Bishopville High School is a historic high school building located at Bishopville, Lee County, South Carolina. It was built in 1936. When the school built, only white students were allowed to attend, while Black students attended Dennis High School three blocks away. Although the law provided for a separate but equal education, Bishopville was built at a cost of $71,000, while only $17,000 was allotted to build Dennis. Likewise, the expenditures for student were $48.38 per white student, and only $5.68 per Black student. When Dennis High School later burned down, the Black students were just made to double up with the elementary students for 12 years. The original L-shaped building is a two-story, Colonial Revival style masonry structure that rests on a masonry foundation. The rectangular central section features a row of 12 monumental pilasters and two-story flanking, projecting, gabled entrance pavilions. At either end of the central block are symmetrical recessed wings. Additions to the wings of the building were made in 1956, 1965, and 1986.

In 1965, Bishopville refused to play football against St. Johns High School because St. Johns had one black player. Later that year the schools were integrated, and Bishopville High School became almost all Black. The same year, Lee Academy was established as a segregation academy for white students.

The building was destroyed in March 2016.

It was added to the National Register of Historic Places in 2004.
