= University School of the Lowcountry =

Location
- Mount Pleasant, South Carolina; USA; 32°47′33″N 79°52′16″W

Information
- Type: Private Day school
- Established: 2007
- Head of school: Nicole Brockman
- Grades: 3-12
- Student to teacher ratio: 6:1
- Campus: Suburban
- Colors: Blue, Green, and White
- Accreditation: SCISA
- Website: http://www.uslowcountry.org/

University School of the Lowcountry (USL) is a small independent school, grades 3-12, located in Mount Pleasant, South Carolina with IRS 501(c)(3) tax-exempt status. University School is located on the campus of Hibben United Methodist Church. USL is designed for high-achieving, curious, hard-working, nice, and empathetic students. The school has consistent exemplary performance on the 7th grade Duke TIP SAT and 8th grade PSAT programs. Charleston reporter Stratton Lawrence termed USL "A School With No Bullies" in a 2013 article.

== Features ==
This school is known for its field trips, also known as LOTCs. University School Intermediate and Middle School students learn three global languages (Latin, Spanish, and Mandarin) concurrently. Students exit poll during each election and make informed predictions about the results, and the Post and Courier featured the accurate prediction of Linda Page's victory in the 2013 Mount Pleasant mayoral election and the 2015 City of Charleston mayoral and Mount Pleasant town council elections right after polls closed. University School's quality of life survey and strong vs. weak mayor poll results also served to inform Page's agenda upon being elected. Post and Courier columnist Brian Hicks builds upon the results of a survey question in the 2015 exit poll about full vs. part-time mayor for Mount Pleasant ("Mount Pleasant should listen to voters on strong-mayor government"). USL's individualized and advanced curriculum enables students to earn more high school credits (Carnegie Units) than any other in the state. The average USL 8th grader finishes Middle School with 5 high school credits (Spanish I, Spanish II, Latin I, Latin II, Algebra,) but students have the ability to go above and beyond with academics and reach levels like 10 credits by the end of 8th grade. A student needs 24 specific credits to graduate high school in South Carolina, and University School's program enables students to advance to a higher level and explore more on- and off-campus opportunities in high school because of the credits earned in Middle School.

== Enrollment ==
There are 3 divisions and 9 grade levels, serving around 85 students every year:

- Intermediate School (grades 3-5) - Tuition $15,900
- Middle School (grades 6-8) - Tuition $16,900
- Upper School (grades 9-12) - Tuition $17,500

- Tuition from 2024-25 school year

Students hail from Mount Pleasant, Charleston, North Charleston, Isle of Palms, Sullivan's Island, Folly Beach, Summerville, Daniel Island, James Island, Awendaw, and West Ashley.

All prospective students take at least one of what is known as a "shadow day." During a shadow day, prospective students follow a USL student in their same age range and go to all their classes to learn about what a day is like at USL.

There is an admissions test that is mostly to place kids in classes like math and to register abilities in other categories.

== Honors ==
Head of School Jason Kreutner received the "Rookie of the Year" Headmaster Award in 2009 and the Dr. Charles S. Aimar Educational Leadership Award in 2013 from the South Carolina Independent School Association. Nikki Brockman, Math teacher and Math Department Chair, was named the 2018 Middle School Teacher of the Year for South Carolina's independent schools. In their first seven years of competing (through the 2019-2020 school year), University School has won the SCISA Middle School State Math Meet five times and placed second twice and continues to earn a multitude of awards today. It has become the first school in the South Carolina Independent Schools Association (SCISA) to win 1st place in all divisions in Quiz Bowl (2020) and The Math Meet (2024.)

== Memberships ==
- Palmetto Association of Independent Schools (PAIS)
- South Carolina Independent School Association (SCISA)
- Association for Experiential Education (AEE)
- National Business Officers Association (NBOA)
- TogetherSC
- Independent School Management (ISM)
- Association for Supervision and Curriculum Development (ASCD)
