= Montessori School of Anderson =

Coordinates: 34.5620175°N 82.6389322°W

- 280 Sam McGee Road, Anderson, South Carolina 29621; United States

Information
- Type: Private
- Motto: Educating Joyful Scholars Since 1973
- Established: 1973
- Founder: Karen Holt
- School district: Anderson District 5
- Principal: Dana Hill
- Grades: K–12
- Colors: Blue and white
- Team name: Montessori Eagles
- Newspaper: Montessori Matters
- Website: www.msasc.org

Montessori School of Anderson (MSA) is a private school located in Anderson, South Carolina, United States. This school is considered a Montessori school because the school is based on the educational approach developed by the Italian physician and educator Maria Montessori. The Montessori School of Anderson is one of the few Montessori schools in the United States that educates K–12 students.

== History ==
Montessori School of Anderson was founded in 1973 as a preschool, when they borrowed basement space from a local church. In 1974, two acres of land on Sam McGee Road were bought and were used to construct classrooms. Over many years, more acres were bought on that road and were used to construct a larger campus. The school also gradually brought about more programs for different educational levels and age groups.

In 2019, the Montessori School of Anderson's middle school was designated STEAM-certified by the South Carolina Independent School Association (SCISA).

== Outings ==
Selected students of Montessori School of Anderson annually attend a local mock trial competition, which is hosted by South Carolina Bar. In August 2015, a group of students in a drama class at Montessori School of Anderson flew to Edinburgh, Scotland to perform a play based on the American novel Walk Two Moons by Sharon Creech at the 2015 Edinburgh Festival Fringe. In January 2017 the Montessori School of Anderson was a participant in the Harvard Model United Nations conference, held in Boston, Massachusetts along with several other schools from around the world. In March 2017, the Montessori School of Anderson's high school drama class travelled to Lexington, Kentucky to perform a play titled "¡Bocón!" at the Southeastern Theatre Conference, after winning second place at the state conference.
