= RJ Barrett =

Canadian basketball player (born 2000)

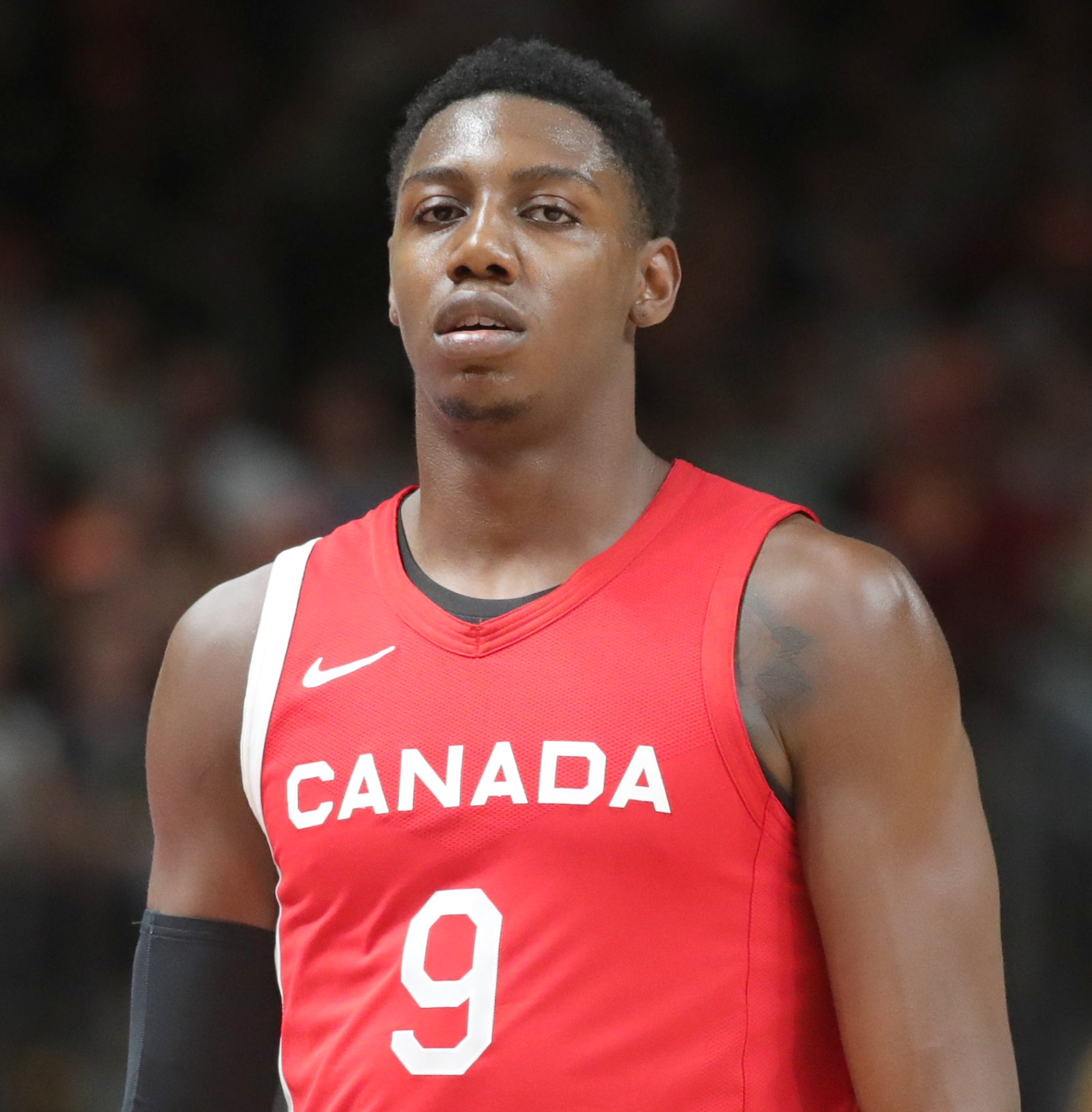
- Barrett with Canada in 2023

No. 9 – Toronto Raptors
- Position: Shooting guard / small forward
- League: NBA

Personal information
- Born: June 14, 2000 (age 26) Toronto, Ontario, Canada
- Listed height: 6 ft 6 in (1.98 m)
- Listed weight: 214 lb (97 kg)

Career information
- High school: St. Marcellinus (Mississauga, Ontario); Montverde Academy (Montverde, Florida)
- College: Duke (2018–2019)
- NBA draft: 2019: 1st round, 3rd overall pick
- Drafted by: New York Knicks
- Playing career: 2019–present

Career history
- 2019–2023: New York Knicks
- 2023–present: Toronto Raptors

Career highlights
- Consensus first-team All-American (2019); Jerry West Award (2019); First-team All-ACC (2019); ACC All-Freshman team (2019); National high school player of the year (2018); McDonald's All-American (2018); FIBA U19 World Cup MVP (2017); 2× NBA Rising Star (2020, 2021)
- Stats at NBA.com
- Stats at Basketball Reference
Medals
Men's basketball
Representing Canada
FIBA World Cup
Bronze medal – third place	2023 Philippines–Japan–Indonesia
FIBA U19 World Cup
Gold medal – first place	2017 Egypt	Team
FIBA Americas Under-16 Championship
Silver medal – second place	2015 Argentina	Team

Rowan Alexander "RJ" Barrett Jr. (born June 14, 2000) is a Canadian professional basketball player for the Toronto Raptors of the National Basketball Association (NBA). Nicknamed "the Maple Mamba", he was selected third overall in the 2019 NBA draft by the New York Knicks after one year of college basketball with the Duke Blue Devils.

Born in Toronto as the son of former basketball player Rowan Barrett, Barrett shone at St. Marcellinus Secondary School in Mississauga, Ontario, before transferring to Montverde Academy in Montverde, Florida. He was a five-star recruit and the consensus top recruit in the 2018 class, earning Naismith Prep Player of the Year and Gatorade National Player of the Year accolades in his final high school season whilst playing as a shooting guard a majority of the season. He was ranked the top player in his class by all recruiting services and was the first player since LeBron James to sweep all major awards in high school and win the national championship.

With the Canadian national under-19 team, Barrett was named MVP at the 2017 FIBA Under-19 Basketball World Cup after leading his team to a gold medal. He debuted for the senior team during qualification for the 2019 FIBA World Cup.

== Early life and career ==
Barrett was born in Toronto, Ontario, to Kesha Duhaney and former professional basketball player Rowan Barrett. Early in his childhood, he developed an interest in basketball and played with a mini-hoop in his playroom in France, where his father was playing professional basketball at the time. In the 2005–06 season, he started playing organized basketball in the youth set-up of JDA Dijon Basket. While living in France, Barrett attended a French school but was taught English by his mother. He lived in a number of countries due to his father's career. Barrett additionally played basketball with players his age through the clubs of which his father was a member.

His family settled in Mississauga, Ontario in 2008, when his father left professional basketball. While growing up, he was also involved in football, 100 metres sprinting, and the high jump. At age 12, after struggling in a basketball game and coming home crying, Barrett began focusing on basketball instead of football to avoid missing tournaments. At that age, he told his father that he wanted to be an NBA All-Star and make the Basketball Hall of Fame. He sometimes trained with Steve Nash, his godfather and father's friend.

Barrett, under the guidance of his father, emerged as one of the best under-12 players in Ontario. He attended Horizon Jeunesse in Park Royal, Mississauga, leading his school team to a city title for Mississauga French elementary schools, where he was named most valuable player (MVP) despite facing older opponents. Barrett also played for the Regional Elite Development Academy (REDA) under-12 program on the Amateur Athletic Union (AAU) circuit, facing many teams from the United States. When he was 12, he was identified by the Ontario Basketball Association as one of the best players in his age group, and he consequently trained with the Canada Basketball junior academy, through which he competed for the Ontario provincial team. By age 15, Barrett was generally playing the point guard position. On August 3, 2014, he scored 37 points and grabbed seven rebounds in a 93–53 win over Quebec at an under-15 provincial tournament. Through grades seven and eight, Barrett attended École Secondaire Jeunes Sans Frontières, a French language school in Brampton.

== High school career ==
=== St. Marcellinus (2014–2015) ===
"While we don't often give praise in the early stages of a player's career (ninth grade), Rowan Barrett Jr (2019 6'4 wing) is proving to be the exception—a cold blooded killer, still out for blood. Special."

— Elias Sbiet, analyst for recruiting website North Pole Hoops, on Barrett in 2014.

Barrett began high school at St. Marcellinus Secondary School in Mississauga, whilst competing for the Brampton Warriors AAU team through the REDA. After his 27-point effort for St. Marcellinus against Bill Crothers Secondary School on October 9, 2014, Canadian recruiting website North Pole Hoops labeled him "special" despite only being in his first year. In February 2015, he was named MVP of the Guy Vetrie Memorial tournament after scoring 41 points and a making the game-winner for REDA in a 74–72 win over BTB Academy. In April, Barrett was invited to the Region of Peel Secondary Schools Athletic Association (ROPSSAA) all-star game. At the game, he was recognized as the best prospect in the ROPSSAA. In the same month, Barrett scored a game-high 25 points in the Futures Game at the BioSteel All-Canadian Basketball Game, which featured top grade 9 and 10 players across Canada.

=== Montverde Academy (2015–2018) ===
==== Sophomore year (2015–16) ====
In September 2015, one week after touring top prep schools in the United States, Barrett announced that he would leave St. Marcellinus. Later in the month, he transferred to Montverde Academy, a school in Montverde, Florida, with a decorated basketball program. Barrett made the decision in order to "take his game to another level" but described the transition as "rough". On December 7, he chipped in a team-high 18 points in a nationally televised game versus Huntington Prep School. Barrett erupted for 31 points on December 21, in a loss to Chino Hills High School at the City of Palms Classic quarterfinal. On April 15, 2016, he tallied 22 points and eight rebounds at the 2016 Jordan Brand Classic International Game, earning game MVP honors. At the end of the season, after leading Montverde Academy in scoring, Barrett was named to the MaxPreps Freshman All-American First Team.

==== Junior year (2016–17) ====
"I love the kid. I think he's really, really talented. He can handle the ball, can get to the basketball at will; he's tough, he's competitive ... he can go both ways, offensively. Defensively he's not afraid to guard the best player on the other team. As a coach you can't ask for much more, which is why he's the camp MVP."

— Fred Vinson on Barrett after coaching him at Basketball Without Borders in 2017

Entering 2016–17, Barrett's sophomore season for Montverde, he was among 20 players named to the USA Today High School Sports All-USA Preseason Team. In November 2016, he was named to the Naismith Prep Player of the Year Award watch list. In December, Barrett led Montverde to a City of Palms Classic title, scoring a team-best 15 points in the finals against Memphis East High School, and received tournament MVP honors. He recorded 21 points on January 16, 2017, in a 73–67 win over Bishop Montgomery High School, to help his team win the Spalding Hoophall Classic. In February, Barrett garnered MVP accolades at Basketball Without Borders, a three-day camp during NBA All-Star Weekend. He joined the World Select Team at the 2017 Nike Hoop Summit in April, posting nine points and two steals in 20 minutes. Barrett finished the season averaging 22 points and 7 rebounds per game in high school, being tabbed National Sophomore of the Year by MaxPreps and making the Naismith All-American Third Team.

==== Senior year (2017–18) ====
On July 31, 2017, Barrett reclassified to the 2018 class because he believed he was "ready to move up and to be in college a year earlier." Entering the 2017–18 season, he was named to the USA Today High School Sports All-USA Preseason Team. In his season opener on November 28, 2017, Barrett led Montverde, ranked the No. 1 team in the nation by MaxPreps, with 29 points in a 97–55 win over The Rock School. On January 11, 2018, in a nationally televised match-up with Orlando Christian Prep, he scored 24 points. Barrett posted 22 points and 10 rebounds on January 15 to defeat Mater Dei High School at the Spalding Hoophall Classic. On March 23, he played in the Signature All-Canadian Showcase, which featured 24 top Canadian prospects. Later in the month, Barrett took part in the 2018 McDonald's All-American Boys Game, where he scored 26 points.

In March 2018, Barrett was awarded the prestigious Morgan Wooten National Player of the Year award for "displaying outstanding character, showing leadership and embodying the values of a student athlete". One of the ways Barrett exhibited these attributes was by being involved in the Basketball Buddies Program of Montverde Academy, where he was in charge of mentoring young basketball athletes with their basketball skills, as well as advising them on how to manage their academics.

In the 2017–18 season, he led the undefeated Montverde team to the Geico National boys’ basketball championship, recording 25 points and 15 rebounds in the championship game.

Barrett scored a game-high 20 points to go along with nine rebounds, six assists and five steals at the 2018 Nike Hoop Summit and was named MVP.

=== Recruiting ===
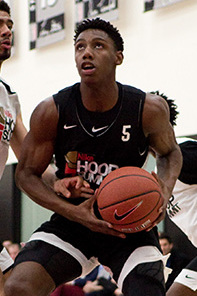
Barrett at the 2017 Nike Hoop Summit

While attending St. Marcellinus Secondary School, Barrett was tabbed as the top Canadian prospect in the 2019 class. Barrett was rated as a five-star recruit and ranked the No.1 overall recruit in the class of 2018.

He received scholarship offers from several major universities including Arizona, Duke, Indiana, Kansas, Kentucky, Missouri, Oklahoma, Oregon, Texas, UCLA, and USC, according to ESPN. Speaking to nbadraft.net in April 2017, Roy Rana, who coached Barrett at the 2017 FIBA Under-19 World Cup and at the Nike Hoop Summit, was quoted as saying about Barrett: "A star. A potential superstar down the road."

On August 16, 2017, Barrett narrowed down to five schools: Duke, Arizona, Oregon, Kentucky, and Michigan. On November 10, 2017, he announced that he would be attending Duke for the 2018–2019 season. Commenting on his decision, he said: "It feels like home. And obviously they have a great coach ... I love Coach K. I've been watching Duke since I was really young."

College recruiting
Name	Hometown	School	Height	Weight	Commit date
RJ Barrett; SF	Mississauga, Ontario	Montverde Academy (FL)	6 ft 7 in (2.01 m)	200 lb (91 kg)	Nov 10, 2017
RJ Barrett; SF	Recruit ratings: Rivals: 247Sports: ESPN: (96)				
Overall recruit ranking: Rivals: 1 247Sports: 1 ESPN: 1
Note: In many cases, Scout, Rivals, 247Sports, On3, and ESPN may conflict in their listings of height and weight.; In these cases, the average was taken. ESPN grades are on a 100-point scale.; Sources: "Duke 2018 Basketball Commitments". Rivals.; "2018 Duke Blue Devils Recruiting Class". ESPN.; "2018 Team Ranking". Rivals.

== College career ==
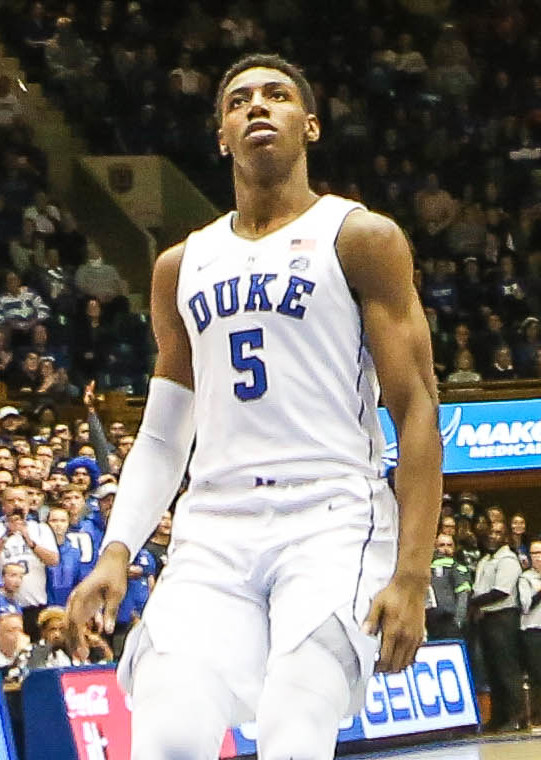
Barrett with Duke in 2018

On November 6, in his first regular season game, he posted 33 points and six assists against second-ranked Kentucky at the Champions Classic, breaking the Duke freshman scoring record in a debut. On December 3, 2018, Barrett was named Atlantic Coast Conference (ACC) rookie of the week. Barrett tallied his first double-double on December 5, with 27 points and 15 rebounds versus Hartford. On December 10, 2018, Barrett earned ACC player and freshman of the week honors for the second time. On January 28, 2019, Barrett earned his third ACC freshman of the week honor. On February 9, Barrett scored 26 points in an 81–71 victory against Virginia. On February 17, Barrett recorded 23 points, 11 rebounds, and 10 assists in a 94–78 win over North Carolina State. It was the fourth time in Duke history (second time under Mike Krzyzewski's tenure as head coach) where a player recorded a triple-double for the team. On February 25, 2019, Barrett was again named ACC freshman of the week for the fourth consecutive time. At the end of Duke's regular season, Barrett was named a member of both the Sporting News' All-American First Team, ACC All-Freshman team and the All-ACC First Team alongside his teammate Zion Williamson. Barrett was named USA Today's Player of the Year.

On March 22, Barrett led the team in both points and rebounds with 26 points and 14 rebounds in an 85–62 win over no. 16 North Dakota State in the NCAA Tournament. He saw action in a total of 38 games (starting all 38) as a freshman, averaging 22.6 points, 7.6 rebounds and 4.3 assists a contest.

Following Duke's loss in the 2019 NCAA men's basketball tournament, Barrett announced his intention to forgo his final three seasons of collegiate eligibility and declare for the 2019 NBA draft.

== Professional career ==
=== New York Knicks (2019–2023) ===
==== 2019–20 season ====
On June 20, 2019, the New York Knicks drafted Barrett with the third overall pick in the 2019 NBA draft. By then Barrett had been nicknamed "Maple Mamba" due to his playstyle resemblance to Kobe Bryant. On July 3, Barrett officially signed with the Knicks. On October 23, 2019, Barrett made his debut in the NBA, starting in a 111–120 loss to the San Antonio Spurs with 21 points, five rebounds, two assists and two steals. On December 17, Barrett scored a then career-high 27 points with six rebounds, an assist and a steal in a 143–120 win over the Atlanta Hawks. Barrett came down with a sprained ankle in a game against the Phoenix Suns on January 16, 2020. On March 2, Barrett tied his career-high 27 points by hitting a clutch layup before the game ended. He also had five rebounds, five assists and one steal in the 125–123 victory over the Houston Rockets.

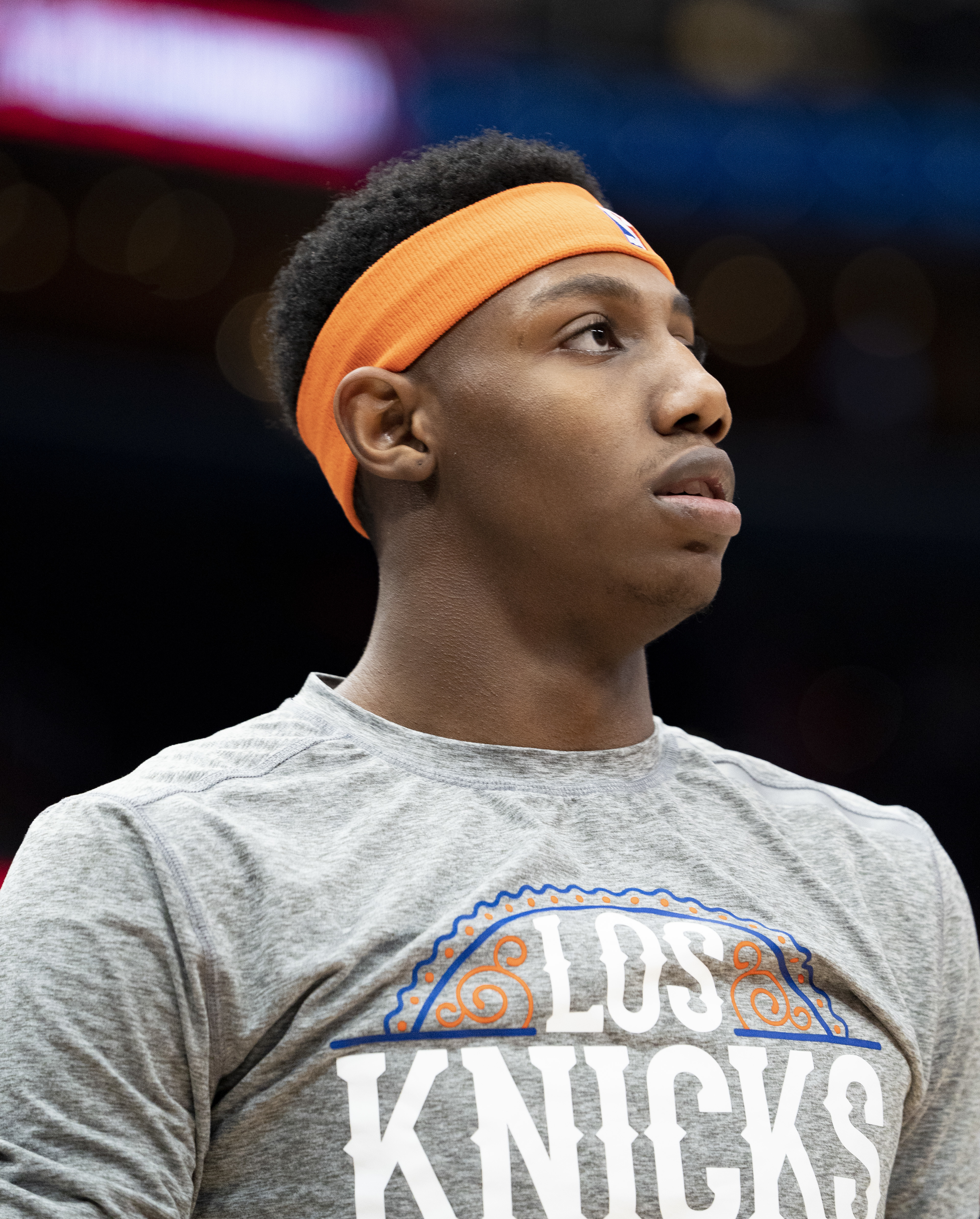
Barrett with the Knicks in 2020

Barrett finished his rookie season averaging 14.3 points, 5.0 rebounds, 2.6 assists, and 1.0 steals in 30.4 minutes. He appeared in 56 games, starting in 55. He was controversially left out of an NBA All-Rookie Team after the premature end of the regular season.

==== 2020–21 season ====
On December 21, 2020, the Knicks announced that they exercised their third-year option on Barrett. On January 21, Barrett scored a then career-high 28 points, along with five assists and two rebounds, in a 119–104 win over the Golden State Warriors. On March 13, Barrett scored a then career-high 32 points, along with five rebounds and three assists, in a 119–97 win over the Oklahoma City Thunder. Barrett made significant strides in his second year, finishing with 17.6 points per game, 5.8 rebounds, and 3.0 assists. Barrett also made big improvements in his shooting, finishing the season shooting 40.1 percent from the three-point line, and 74.6 percent from the free throw line. Barrett started in all 72 games during the season, which was shortened due to the COVID-19 pandemic, playing 34.9 minutes per game. The Knicks made the playoffs for the first time in eight years securing home court advantage in the first round. The Knicks ultimately lost 4–1 in the first round to the Atlanta Hawks.

==== 2021–22 season ====
On January 6, 2022, Barrett recorded 13 points and six assists and ended the night with a contested game-winning three-pointer at the buzzer, giving the Knicks a 108–105 victory over the Boston Celtics, on a night where New York trailed by as much as 25. On January 10, against the San Antonio Spurs he scored 31 points, and on January 12 against the Dallas Mavericks. Barrett scored 32 points setting a franchise record becoming the youngest Knick to get consecutive games with at least 30 points at just 21 years old. He also became the eighth NBA player to tally 2,000 points, 500 rebounds and 300 assists by 21 years old, joining Kevin Garnett, Kobe Bryant, Tracy McGrady, LeBron James, Carmelo Anthony, Kevin Durant and Luka Doncic. On February 6, he scored a then career-high 36 points, along with eight rebounds and five assists, in a 122–115 overtime loss against the Los Angeles Lakers. On February 25, Barrett scored a career-high 46 points in a 115–100 loss to the Miami Heat. He became the 7th player in NBA history to score 3400+ points, 1100+ rebounds and 550+ assist's before turning 22 years old joining Kevin Garnett, Tracy McGrady, Carmelo Anthony, LeBron James, Kevin Durant, and Luka Doncic. He also became the youngest Knicks player to average 20 points per game for a season at 21 years old.

==== 2022–23 season ====
On September 1, 2022, Barrett re-signed with the Knicks on a four-year, $120M deal. He was the first player to agree to a multiyear extension after a rookie deal with the Knicks since Charlie Ward in 1999.

=== Toronto Raptors (2023–present) ===
On December 30, 2023, the Knicks traded Barrett, along with Immanuel Quickley and a 2024 second-round draft pick, to the Toronto Raptors in exchange for OG Anunoby, Precious Achiuwa and Malachi Flynn. In his first game with his hometown Raptors on January 1, 2024, Barrett put up 19 points and nine rebounds on 50 percent shooting from the field goal in a 124–121 win against the Cleveland Cavaliers. It was reported by Zach Lowe of ESPN that some NBA insiders had labelled Barrett's contract "a toxic asset" following the trade. On January 7, 2024, Barrett scored a season-high 37 points on 13 of 20 shooting, along with 6 rebounds and 6 assists in a 133–118 win over the Golden State Warriors.

On November 1, 2024, Barrett recorded a season-high 33 points and achieved a then career-high 12 assists in a 131–125 loss against the Los Angeles Lakers. On November 16, Barrett achieved his first career triple-double with 25 points, 10 rebounds, and a career-high 15 assists in a 126–123 overtime loss to the Boston Celtics.

On April 24, 2026, during Game 3 of the first round of the NBA playoffs against the Cleveland Cavaliers, Barrett recorded a playoff career-high 33 points to help fuel Toronto to a 126–104 victory. On May 1, with 1.2 seconds left in overtime of Game 6 and the Raptors down a point facing imminent elimination, Barrett hit a rim-bounce game-winning three pointer to win the game and force a deciding Game 7. The Raptors went on to lose 114–102 to the Cavaliers in the decisive game.

== National team career ==
Barrett was the youngest player on Canada's under-16 national team that won silver at the 2015 FIBA Americas U16 Championship, in Argentina. Pouring in 14.6 points a contest, he led his team in scoring during the tournament.

He averaged 18.4 points, 4.6 rebounds and 2.3 assists per game at the 2016 FIBA U17 World Cup, in Spain, en route to eurobasket.com's All-World Cup U17 Second Team honors.

In July 2017, Barrett made headlines with a 38-point, 13-rebound, and five-assist showing as he guided Canada's under-19 squad to a 99–87 semifinal win over the US at the FIBA Under-19 Basketball World Cup. At the time, Northpolehoops.com described this performance as Barrett's "biggest game of his career so far". He subsequently led Canada to the title, tallying game-highs of 18 points and 12 rebounds in the championship game against Italy, and was named to the tournament's All-Star Five and also the tournament Most Valuable Player. Averaging 21.6 points a game, he was also the leading scorer of the tournament.

In June 2018, he made his debut on Canada's senior men's national team, scoring 16 points in a 97–62 win over China.

On May 24, 2022, Barrett agreed to a three-year commitment to play with the Canadian senior men's national team.

On September 3, they qualified to the quarter-finals of 2023 FIBA Basketball World Cup, in the process securing a berth at the 2024 Summer Olympics." Barrett ultimately sealed the victory with a 3 point shot and won the bronze medal over the United States in the third-place game. Barrett outplayed his Knicks teammates Jalen Brunson and Josh Hart with 23 points on 50% shooting from the field. He combined with Dillon Brooks (39 points) and Shai Gilgeous-Alexander (31 points) for 93 points. This was Canada's first ever World Cup medal, and first medal at a major global tournament since the 1936 Summer Olympics.

He was named to Canada's roster for the 2024 Summer Olympics in Paris.

== Career statistics ==
Legend
GP	Games played	GS	Games started	MPG	Minutes per game
FG%	Field goal percentage	3P%	3-point field goal percentage	FT%	Free throw percentage
RPG	Rebounds per game	APG	Assists per game	SPG	Steals per game
BPG	Blocks per game	PPG	Points per game	**Bold**	Career high
*	Led the league

=== NBA ===
==== Regular season ====
Year	Team	GP	GS	MPG	FG%	3P%	FT%	RPG	APG	SPG	BPG	PPG
2019–20	New York	56	55	30.4	.402	.320	.614	5.0	2.6	**1.0**	.3	14.3
2020–21	New York	72*	72*	**34.9**	.441	**.401**	.746	5.8	3.0	.7	.3	17.6
2021–22	New York	70	70	34.5	.408	.342	.714	5.8	3.0	.6	.2	20.0
2022–23	New York	**73**	**73**	33.9	.434	.310	.740	5.0	2.8	.4	.2	19.6
2023–24	New York	26	26	29.5	.423	.331	**.831**	4.3	2.4	.5	.3	18.2
2023–24	Toronto	32	32	33.5	**.553**	.392	.629	**6.4**	4.1	.6	**.4**	**21.8**
2024–25	Toronto	58	58	32.2	.468	.350	.630	6.3	**5.4**	.8	.3	21.1
2025–26	Toronto	57	57	30.3	.491	.339	.717	5.3	3.3	.7	.3	19.3
Career		444	443	32.7	.447	.345	.700	5.5	3.3	.7	.3	18.9

==== Playoffs ====
Year	Team	GP	GS	MPG	FG%	3P%	FT%	RPG	APG	SPG	BPG	PPG
2021	New York	5	5	32.3	.388	.286	**.800**	**7.2**	3.0	.8	**.4**	14.4
2023	New York	**11**	**11**	34.3	.433	.328	.769	4.5	2.8	.8	.2	19.3
2026	Toronto	7	7	**38.7**	**.477**	**.386**	.634	7.0	**4.0**	**1.3**	.3	**24.1**
Career		23	23	35.2	.441	.338	.727	5.8	3.2	1.0	.3	19.7

=== College ===
Year	Team	GP	GS	MPG	FG%	3P%	FT%	RPG	APG	SPG	BPG	PPG
2018–19	Duke	38	38	35.3	.454	.308	.665	7.6	4.3	.9	.4	22.4

== Personal life ==
Barrett's father Rowan Barrett was born to Jamaican parents and raised in Toronto. He played college basketball for St. John's before embarking on a professional career spent in Europe and South America. Rowan Sr. was a long-time member of the Canadian national team, which he captained at the 2000 Summer Olympics, and later became executive vice president and general manager of Canada Basketball.

Barrett is the godson of Steve Nash, a Basketball Hall of Fame inductee and former head coach of the Brooklyn Nets who played with his father on the Canadian national team. Rowan Sr. first met Nash, who is about two years his junior, while playing for the under-19 national team and quickly became close friends with him. When Barrett was a baby, Nash bought him his first crib.

Barrett's mother Kesha Duhaney is a native of Brooklyn, New York. She was a nationally ranked sprinter and long jumper for St. John's University before working for the Canadian Imperial Bank of Commerce. Barrett's parents first met while attending St. John's. His maternal aunt Dahlia Duhaney was a member of the Jamaica team 4 × 100 m relay that won a gold medal at the 1991 IAAF World Championships. Also on his mother's side, his grandparents ran track for the Jamaica national team, and his uncle played football for the University of Maryland.

Barrett can speak French fluently, although he admitted to being "a little rusty" in 2018. After Barrett graduated from high school, his brother Nathan joined the prep basketball team at Montverde Academy.

== See also ==
- List of Canadian sports personalities
- List of All-Atlantic Coast Conference men's basketball teams
