= Lee Academy (South Carolina) =

Private school in Bishopville, South Carolina, United States

Location
- 630 Cousar Street; Bishopville, South Carolina 29010; United States; 34°13′25″N 80°13′50″W

Information
- Type: Private school
- Established: 1965
- NCES School ID: 01265066
- Head of school: Brad Bochette
- Teaching staff: 24.8 (on an FTE basis)
- Grades: PK–12
- Gender: Co-educational
- Enrollment: 283 (2017–2018, excluding PK)
- Student to teacher ratio: 11.4
- Nickname: Cavaliers
- Website: www.myleeacademy.org

Lee Academy, formerly Robert E. Lee Academy, is a co-educational private school in Bishopville, South Carolina, United States. It was established in 1965 as a segregation academy and continued to serve an overwhelmingly white student body in the 2000s, with only three black students among a student body of more than 250 in 2018.

== History ==
Prior to 1965, Bishopville High School served white students, while black students attended Dennis High School three blocks away. In 1965, the Federal government mandated the integration of public schools in South Carolina. In response, many segregation academies like Robert E. Lee Academy were established by white parents so their children could continue with a segregated education. The school was named after Confederate general Robert E. Lee. According to SCISA founder Tom Turnipseed, Robert E. Lee academy was part of a pattern to oppose integration by founding segregated private schools, and naming them after Confederate leaders. As a result of the support of Lee Academy by Bishopville's white power structure, public schools in Lee county struggled to raise taxes to educate their predominantly black student populations.

As of 2000, the school did not enroll a single black student. In contrast, 92% of students in Lee County Public Schools were black. As of 2018, the school had three black students out of 268 total students.

In the summer of 2020, the school announced plans to change the name to Lee Academy.

== Academics ==
The school is accredited by the South Carolina Independent School Association (SCISA) and is internationally accredited by Cognia. College credits can be earned through Central Carolina Technical College.

== Athletics ==
In 2019, the school won the SCISA 2A championship in baseball.
