= Colleton Preparatory Academy =

Location
- 165 Academy Rd; Walterboro, South Carolina 29488; United States
- Coordinates: 32°56′09″N 80°39′45″W

Information
- Former name: John C. Calhoun Academy
- Type: Private
- Established: 1965 (61 years ago)
- Head of school: Jill Burttram
- Grades: K1–12
- Enrollment: 502 (2023)
- Colors: Blue & White
- Mascot: War Hawks
- Website: www.colletonprep.org

Colleton Preparatory Academy is a pre-kindergarten to 12th grade school in Walterboro, South Carolina, United States.

== History ==
The school opened in 1966 as a segregation academy under the name John C. Calhoun Academy, who was a famous proponent of slavery. During its first school year it was housed in Grace Advent Christian Church. The following year, it moved to its own campus where it remains today. It had been one of 111 schools whose tax-exempt status had been contested by the Internal Revenue Service. In 1990, exemption was granted and the school renamed Colleton.

== Academics ==
The school offers two tracks for high school students: college prep and early college, in coordination with University of South Carolina Salkehatchie.

The school has accreditation from the South Carolina Independent School Association.

== Athletics ==
Colleton competes in baseball, basketball, football, softball, tennis, volleyball, cheerleading, wrestling, cross country, golf and soccer.
