= Florence Christian School =

Coordinates: 34°9′4″N 79°46′5″W

- 2308 South Irby Street; Florence, South Carolina 29505; United States

Information
- Type: Private Christian school
- Established: 1972; 54 years ago
- Principal: Jim Berry (high school), Natalie Hardy (elementary)
- Faculty: NA
- Enrollment: 562 (2023–2024)
- Student to teacher ratio: NA
- Colors: Royal blue and gold
- Mascot: Bald eagle
- Team name: Eagles
- Accreditation: South Carolina Independent School Association
- Website: www.fcseagles.org

Florence Christian School is a private, Baptist Christian school located in Florence, South Carolina, US. It offers an academic program with a largely Christian-oriented curriculum. The school consists of four sections categorized by education: Child Development Center, Kindergarten, Elementary, and Junior and Senior high. It serves as a daycare center and school for grades Pre-K to 12th.

== History ==
Florence Christian School was established in 1972, by Frank Monroe, as a ministry of the Florence Baptist Temple to assist families in training their children spiritually and academically. In August of that year 54 students enrolled in grades K-3.

== Curriculum and facilities ==
The Florence Christian School uses a curriculum consisting of A Beka and BJU Press for grades K-12. Students have mandatory core subjects and Bible study. Various electives are also offered from 7th grade and beyond such as Personal Finance and Sports Management. Students in 11th and 12th grades can be enrolled in dual credit courses which count as up to 19 hours of college credit. Classrooms contain various technology to aid in the student's and teacher's learning and teaching. The library contains over 11,000 books and some computers for educational purposes. There are several computer labs suitable for full classes and a science lab, funded by the Drs. Bruce and Lee Foundation. Athletic facilities include a regulation gymnasium, tennis courts, football field, soccer field, softball field, and baseball field.

== Athletics ==
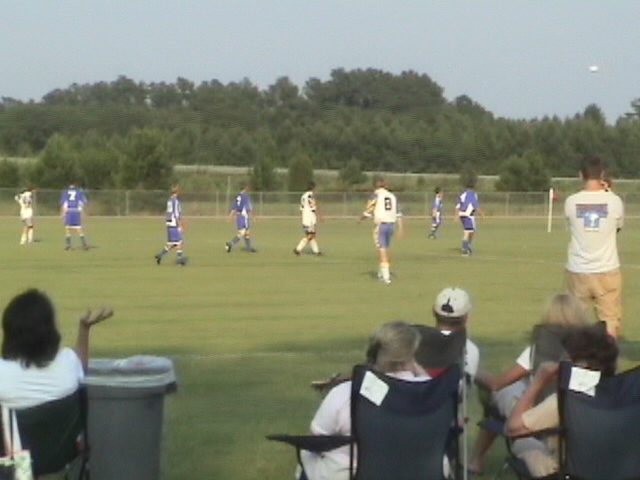
Home varsity soccer game at Florence Christian School

Florence Christian School has fall, winter, and spring sports for both boys and girls.

- Fall sports: football, girls' volleyball, girls' tennis, cheerleading
- Winter sports: boys' and girls' basketball
- Spring sports: baseball, softball, soccer, golf
