= Cardinal Newman High School (Columbia, South Carolina) =

Cardinal Newman
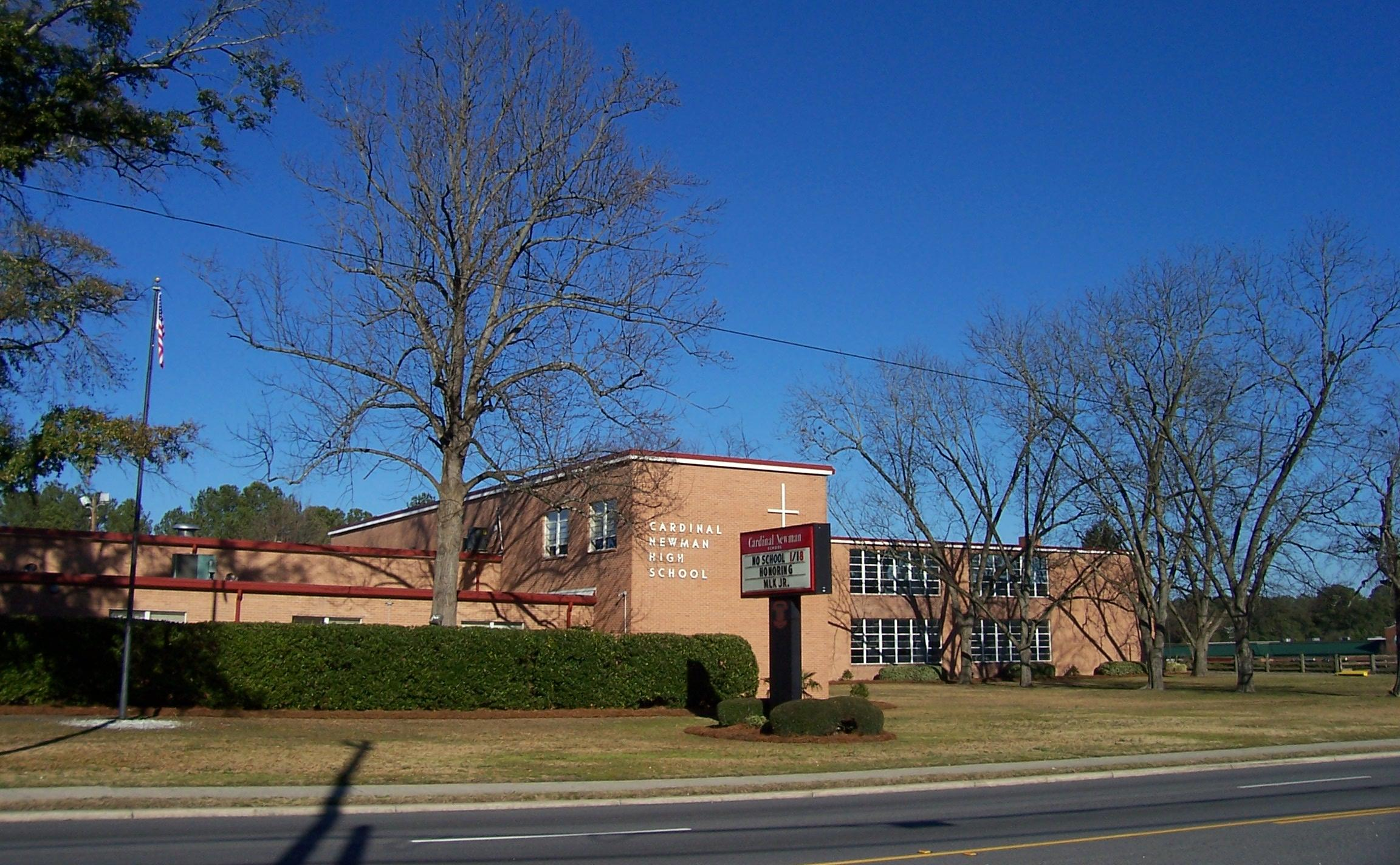

Location
- 2945 Alpine Rd; Columbia, South Carolina 29223; United States; 34°04′33″N 80°55′13″W

Information
- Former names: Ursuline Academy; Ursuline High School for Young Women; Ursuline High School; Catholic High School of Columbia
- Type: Catholic school
- Motto: Truth, Integrity, and Fidelity
- Religious affiliation: Catholic
- Established: 1858 (168 years ago)
- Founders: Ursuline Sisters
- NCES School ID: 01262804.
- Principal: Jeff Dibattisto
- Head of school: Charles Assey
- Grades: 7–12
- Student to teacher ratio: 9.0
- Colors: Black and Red
- Website: www.cnhs.org

Cardinal Newman High School is a diocesan, Roman Catholic middle and high school outside the city limits of Columbia, South Carolina. It is part of the Roman Catholic Diocese of Charleston.

== History ==
Originally, Ursuline Academy was attached to the Ursuline Convent, founded in 1858. The Academy was burned down by General Sherman's troops in 1865 during the burning of Columbia in the Civil War, but was later rebuilt. It was open to students regardless of religion and incorporated by the state of South Carolina. The successor school, Cardinal Newman, was opened in 1961 and renamed after John Henry Newman. The school moved to a 50-acre campus in unincorporated Richland County near Sesquicentennial State Park in spring 2013 and began instruction there in January 2016.

== Academic programs ==
The school is accredited by the Southern Association of Colleges and Schools, the National Association of Independent Schools, South Carolina Independent School Association, Palmetto Association of Independent Schools, the Association of Supervision and Curriculum Development, and the National Catholic Educational Association.

== Partner schools ==
Cardinal Newman has four Catholic elementary Partner schools in addition to the local public schools: St. Joseph, St. John Neumann, St. Peter and St. Martin de Porres.

== Notable alumni ==
- Gorman Thomas (1978 - transferred), former MLB All-Star pitcher
- Ashlyn Watkins (2022), college basketball player
- Mary Ashley Stevenson (2023 - transferred), college basketball player

== Bibliography ==
- Curran, Robert Emmett (2019). For Church and Confederacy: the Lynches of South Carolina. Columbia, South Carolina: The University of South Carolina Press. ISBN 9781611179170.
- Moore, John Hammond (1993). Columbia and Richland County: A South Carolina Community, 1740-1990. Univ of South Carolina Press. ISBN 978-0-87249-827-3.
- Sennema, David C.; Sennema, Martha D. (July 1, 1997). Columbia, South Carolina: A Postcard History. Arcadia Publishing. ISBN 978-1-4396-1285-9.
- Watson, Ebbie Julian (1908). Handbook of South Carolina; resources, institutions and industries of the state; a summary of the statistics of agriculture, manufactures, geography, climate, geology and physiography, minerals and mining, education, transportation, commerce, government, etc, etc. Columbia, S.C., The State department of agriculture, commerce and immigration ... The State company.
