= Thomas Heyward Academy =

Location
- 1727 Malphrus Road; Ridgeland, South Carolina 29936; United States; 32°30′40″N 81°00′02″W

Information
- Established: 1970 (56 years ago)
- Head of school: Scott Gibson
- Grades: PK–12
- Enrollment: 311 (02016)
- Mascot: Rebels
- Yearbook: Rebel Yell
- Website: www.thomasheyward.org

Thomas Heyward Academy is a private school located in Ridgeland, South Carolina. The school, founded as a segregation academy in 1970, was named after Thomas Heyward Jr., a signer of the Declaration of Independence and Articles of Confederation who was a native of Ridgeland. The schools nickname is The Rebels.

It offers pre-Kindergarten to 12th grade. The school is a member of the South Carolina Independent School Association (SCISA), which was founded in 1965 to provide resources for segregation academies.

== History ==
In 1970, the U.S. Supreme Court, in the case of Alexander v. Holmes County Board of Education ordered that public schools in the United States must be open to children of all races. A group affiliated with the White Citizens Council founded a segregation academy in order to preserve segregation for white children. The school was named after Thomas Heyward Jr., an 18th century Ridgeland native who was a signer of the Declaration of Independence and the Articles of Confederation and a major slaveholder. The school teams play using the nickname The Rebels and the school yearbook is the Rebel Yell, which was a battle cry used by Confederate soldiers during the American Civil War.

== Policies ==
The school has a non-discrimination policy in the areas of race, color, national, and ethnic origin. Any student who becomes pregnant or fathers a child is immediately expelled. Corporal punishment is allowed.

== Demographics ==
In the 2015–2016 school year, 5 of 295 students in grades 1-12 were black. In 2018, there were 9 black students, or less than 3% out of a total enrollment of 306. For comparison, Beaufort County, South Carolina had a population that was 25% black and Jasper County, South Carolina had a population that was 43% black.

== Notable people ==
Paul Murdaugh, 'Rebel' varsity athlete and member of the class of 2017.
