= Greenville Classical Academy =

School in Simpsonville, South Carolina

Coordinates: 34°48′37″N 82°14′10″W

Greenville Classical Academy is a private, classical, K–12 Christian school located in Mauldin, South Carolina. GCA was established in 2004.The mission and vision of Greenville Classical Academy is to provide a distinctly Christ-centered, biblical, and classical education, producing students who glorify God (Deum Glorificare) in their thoughts, words and deeds, and to see generations of godly, biblically educated, academically prepared leaders for our homes, our communities, and our world. It serves approximately 335 students beginning at K4 and continuing through 12th grade. It is a member of the Association of Classical and Christian Schools, Christian Schools International, and the National Association of University-Model Schools. It is accredited by the Association of Christian Schools International.
