= Dennis High School =

- U.S. National Register of Historic Places
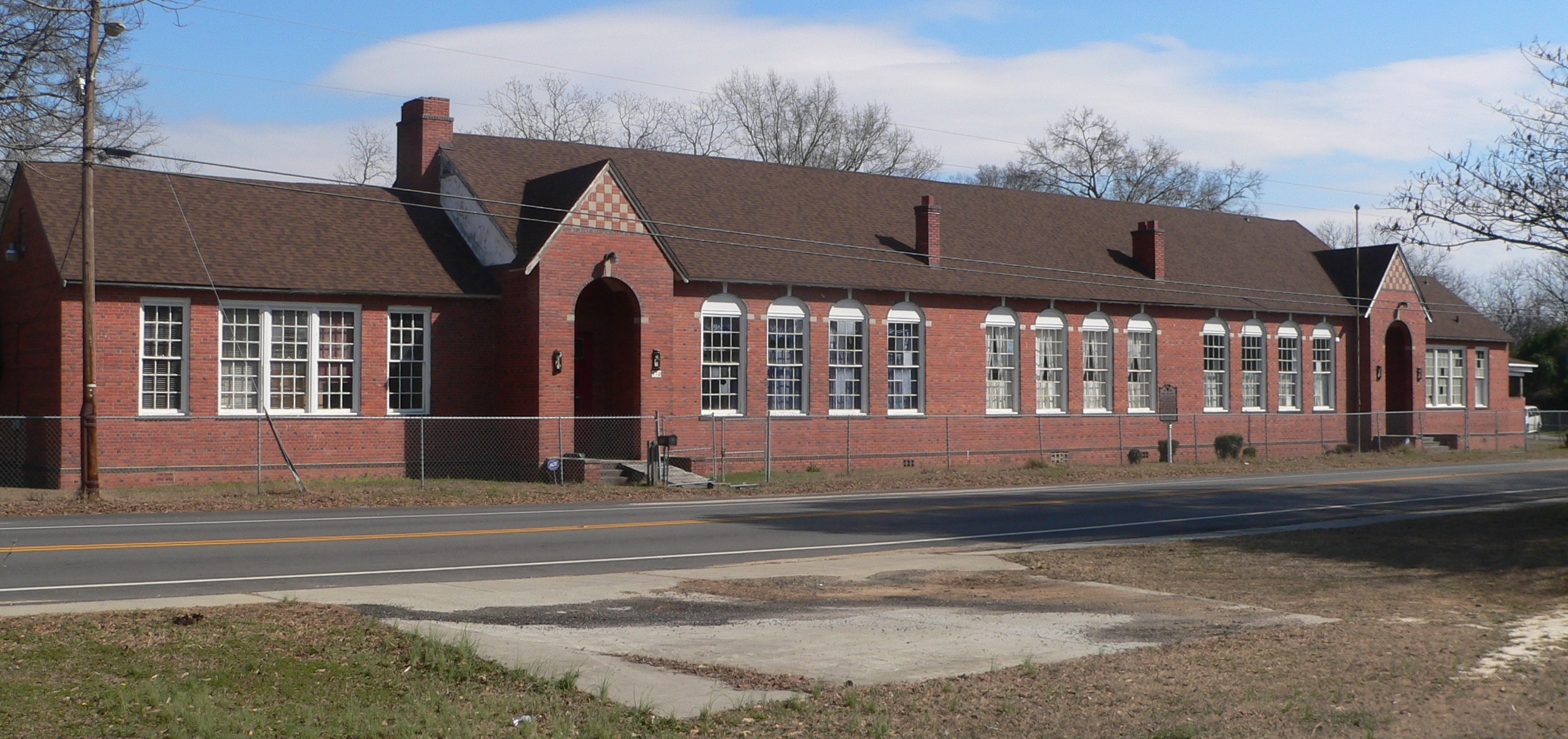
- Dennis High School, February 2013

- Location within South Carolina Location within the United States
- Location: 410 W. Cedar Ln., Bishopville, South Carolina
- Coordinates: 34°13′27″N 80°14′55″W
- Area: 1.2 acres (0.49 ha)
- Built: 1936
- Built by: E.C.B. Construction Company
- Architect: Edgeworth and McBride
- Architectural style: Classical Revival
- MPS: African--American Primary and Secondary School Buildings MPS
- NRHP reference No.: 04001565
- Added to NRHP: January 26, 2005

Dennis High School, also known as Dennis Elementary School and Dennis Primary School, is a historic high school building for African-American students located at Bishopville, Lee County, South Carolina. White students attended Bishopville High School, three blocks away. Although the law mandated for a separate but equal education, $71,000 was allocated to build Bishopville for the whites while only Dennis was built for $17,000. The per-student expenditure at Bishopville High School was $48.38, whereas Black students at Dennis received only $5.68 per student. When Dennis High School later burned down, the Black students were just made to double up with the elementary students for 12 years. Dennis was the only school in the county for black students, and no public bus service was provided until 1952.

The original L-shaped building is a one-story, load-bearing red brick Colonial Revival style structure that rests on a masonry foundation. Recessed symmetrical wings flank the main block. A third wing, which gave the building its original L-shape, houses the auditorium. A single classroom addition was built in 1954.

It was added to the National Register of Historic Places in 2005.
