= Oakbrook Preparatory School =

Coordinates: 34.9451°N 82.0152°W

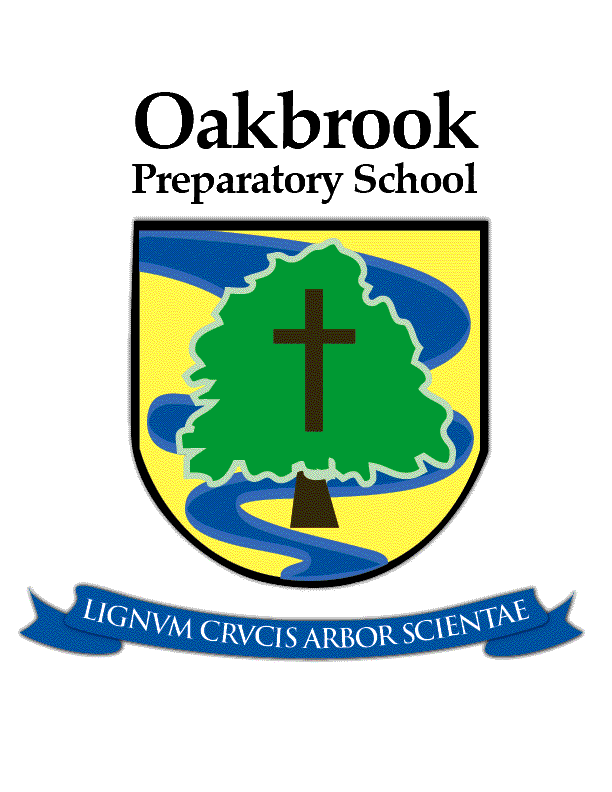

Location
- 190 Lincoln School Road; Spartanburg, South Carolina 29301; United States

Information
- Type: Private school
- Established: 1992 (34 years ago)
- Head of school: R. Andrew Bell
- Faculty: 70
- Grades: K3–12
- Enrollment: 320
- Colors: Navy and Gold
- Athletics conference: SCISA
- Mascot: Knights
- Website: www.oakbrookprep.org

Oakbrook Preparatory School is a private Christian based 3K–12 school, located in Spartanburg, South Carolina. It consists of a lower school for 3K-4th graders, a middle school for 5th–8th graders, and an upper school for 9th–12th graders.

== History ==
Founded by Rosemary Moore in 1992 as the Village School, the school and mission grew until a major expansion in 2002 extended the curriculum to K4-12 and Oakbrook Preparatory School emerged. Thanks to others joining Mrs. Moore and inspiring others, the school grew while carrying on the original Charlotte Mason philosophy.

The 2001–2002 school year was a year of transition for the Village School as the school transformed into Oakbrook Preparatory School.

At the end of 2005, Oakbrook's founder, Rosemary Moore, retired and was given the honorary title of director emeritus. In 2010 Adair Hinds joined Oakbrook Prep as the third head of school. After advancement director Kyle Boyles filled in as interim head of school in 2016–17, John H. Lindsell assumed the head of school position beginning in the 2017–18 school year. In 2019 Kyle Boyles was named head of school. The current head of school, R. Andrew Bell, took over beginning in the 2025 school year.

In 2012 Oakbrook Preparatory School's 33 acre campus completed a $3 million expansion including new Science Lab, Mac Computer Lab, Baseball Field, Soccer / Football Field and parking. In the summer of 2016, Oakbrook added additional classroom space, band facility and robotics lab. Oakbrook currently serves over 440 students.

In 2025, Oakbrook Preparatory School received a donation to fund a campus expansion project, which includes the construction of a two-story lower school building and the expansion of athletic facilities. The new building is scheduled to open for the 2027–2028 academic year.

== Athletics ==
Oakbrook Prep offers cross country, volleyball, soccer, physical education, basketball, swimming, cheerleading, baseball, golf, and football.

Oakbrook Prep's recent athletic success includes 2008, 2012, 2014, and 2016 Girls Varsity Soccer SCISA Championship, 2010, 2011, 2012, 2013 & 2014 Boys Varsity Golf SCISA Championships, 2010 & 2011 (2012 & 2014 SCISA Runner-Up) Boys Varsity Soccer State Championship, 2011, 2012 & 2013 SCISA Cheer Competition Championships. In 2012 & 2013 Oakbrook added individual SCISA Championships in Swimming and Wrestling and the Boys Varsity Basketball 2013 SCISA Championship and 2014 SCISA-runner up. Varsity & Middle School Football teams were added in the Fall of 2016. Boys Varsity Swim won SCISA state in the fall of 2016.

The current Athletic Director is Kyle Roberts.

Oakbrook Prep varsity teams are members of the South Carolina Independent School Association (SCISA) conference.
