= Spartanburg Day School =

School in Spartanburg, South Carolina, US

Location
- 1701 Skylyn Drive; Spartanburg, South Carolina 29307; United States
- Coordinates: 34°58′35″N 81°53′34″W

Information
- Type: Private; college preparatory; day school
- Religious affiliation: Nonsectarian
- Established: 1957 (69 years ago)
- President: Bear Boyd
- Head of school: Dave Skeen
- Faculty: 100
- Grades: 2K–12
- Gender: Co-educational
- Enrollment: 550
- Campus type: Suburban
- Colors: Red and blue
- Athletics: 28 Athletic teams
- Athletics conference: South Carolina Independent School Association (SCISA)
- Mascot: Griffin
- Nickname: Griffins
- Accreditation: SACS; NAIS
- Newspaper: The Talon
- Endowment: $30 million
- Tuition: Preschool: $10,091–$13,295; K–12: $17,067–$23,991
- Website: www.spartanburgdayschool.org

Spartanburg Day School is a private, nonsectarian, college preparatory school located in unincorporated Spartanburg County, South Carolina, United States, with a Spartanburg post office address, in the Greenville-Spartanburg area. It consists of a lower school for 2K-4th graders, a middle school for 5th–8th graders, and an upper school for 9th–12th graders.

== History ==
Spartanburg Day School was established on September 12, 1957, at the Drayton Mill Community Building, with 35 students in 1st–5th grades. As more upper-level grades were needed, a new location for SDS was established on Skylyn Drive, where the school is currently located. In October 1962, the new campus was officially opened. The lower school did not move to the current campus until 1993.

When the families of foreign expatriates began moving to the Greenville-Spartanburg area in the 20th century, most of the children attended Spartanburg Country Day School.

== Athletics ==
The Spartanburg Day Griffins compete in the South Carolina Independent Schools Association (SCISA). Each student from grades 7 to 12 is required to participate in one athletic team each academic year. SDS offers cross country, volleyball, soccer, physical education, tennis, basketball, swimming, cheerleading, baseball, lacrosse, golf, and track and field. The school does not deny students from participating in its athletic programs due to inexperience or ability. SDS has enjoyed much athletic success in recent years, including back-to-back baseball SCISA championships in 2001 and 2002, as well as SCISA championship teams in men's and women's tennis. The boys basketball team led by future NBA player Zion Williamson, has won three consecutive SCISA championships from 2016 to 2018.

== Notable alumni ==
- Celia Weston (class of 1966), American character actress. Weston has received an Independent Spirit Award nomination (Dead Man Walking), a Screen Actors Guild Award nomination (In the Bedroom) and a Tony Award nomination (The Last Night of Ballyhoo).
- Betsy Wakefield Teter (class of 1976), co-founder of the Hub City Writers Project, an independent press, and 2017 recipient of the Elizabeth O'Neill Verner Governor's Award for the Arts.
- Landya B. McCafferty (class of 1980), Chief United States District Judge of the United States District Court for the District of New Hampshire and first female judge to serve in the District of New Hampshire.
- William J. Dobson (class of 1991), coeditor of the Journal of Democracy, and past editor at Slate, NPR, and Newsweek International. Dobson is the author of The Dictator’s Learning Curve: Inside the Global Battle for Democracy.
- Zion Williamson (class of 2018), basketball player for the New Orleans Pelicans and number one pick in the NBA's 2019 draft.
