= Brashier Middle College Charter High School =

Brashier Middle College Charter High

Location
- 1830 W. Georgia Road; Simpsonville, South Carolina 29680; United States; 34°42′39″N 82°18′24″W

Information
- Type: Charter school
- Motto: Hard Work Pays Off
- Established: 2006 (20 years ago)
- School district: Charter Institute at Erskine
- Superintendent: Cameron Runyan
- Principal: Trina Freeman
- Grades: 9–12
- Enrollment: 438
- Colors: Green, white and black
- Mascot: Bengals
- Newspaper: Brashier Middle College News
- Website: www.brashiermiddlecollege.org

Brashier Middle College Charter High School is a public funded charter school in Simpsonville, South Carolina, United States. It is a sister campus of the main Greenville Tech campus in Greenville, South Carolina. In 2022, BMC was awarded the National Blue Ribbon Award.

== GTC Connection ==
Students attending BMCCHS are allowed to take college classes at Greenville Technical College free of charge through the Dual-Enrollment Program.

== Sports ==
The sports that Brashier offers are less than a typical school, just because it is a Charter School.

- Boys Varsity Basketball
- Boys JV Basketball
- Girls Varsity Basketball
- Swim
- Cross Country
- Men's Soccer
- Women's Soccer
- Softball
- Baseball
- Golf
- Girls Golf

Students can take other sports (such as track & field and football) at the public schools that they are zoned for.

The boys' cross country team were the SCHSL 1A State Champions in 2022. This was the first state championship in the schools history. They also won SCHSL 1A State Champions again in 2023.

There are also multiple notable clubs at Brashier Middle College. The school encourages taking at least one club, however it is not required. Some of the notable clubs include the student-led Cinema Club, which is often attended by well-known people such as Ryan Margadonna. Other clubs include YIG, Code Zero, and many other things.
