= Trinity Collegiate School =

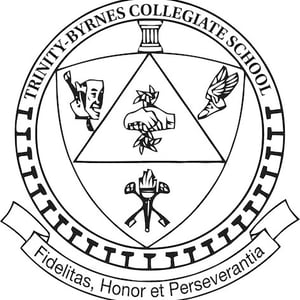

Location
- 5001 Hoffmeyer Road; Darlington, South Carolina 29532; United States

Information
- Type: Independent, college-preparatory school
- Motto: Fidelitas, Honor, et Perseverentia (Loyalty, Honor, and Perseverance)
- Religious affiliations: Independent, Christian
- Established: 1995
- Dean: Kelley Byrd
- Headmaster: Ed Hoffman
- Grades: 6-12
- Gender: Co-educational
- Enrollment: 405 (2021-2022)
- Color: Blue Black White
- Mascot: Titan
- Accreditation: Southern Association of Independent Schools, AdvancED, South Carolina Independent School Association
- Website: https://trinitycollegiate.org/

Trinity Collegiate School, often referred to as TCS, is an independent co-educational college-preparatory day school located in Darlington, South Carolina. The school is on a 100-acre (0.40 km^{2}) campus southwest of Florence and serves about 400 students in grades 6 through 12 from counties throughout the Pee Dee region of northeastern South Carolina. Trinity is the top college preparatory school in the Pee Dee region, with strong programs in academics, arts, and athletics. The school consistently ranks among the best private high schools in South Carolina, ranking at number 11 for Niche's Best Private High Schools in South Carolina and number 6 for Niche's Best Private High Schools for Athletics in South Carolina.

== History ==
=== Trinity Collegiate School ===
Trinity Collegiate School was established in 1995 as a rigorous independent college-preparatory school. Despite serving only grades 7-9 at the time of its founding, Trinity Collegiate added one grade level per year and graduated its first class in 1999.

In 2020, Trinity Collegiate School's board voted to change its name from Trinity-Byrnes Collegiate School to Trinity Collegiate School, citing the segregationist and controversial past of James F. Byrnes (1882-1972) as the reason the school chose to drop “Byrnes” from the name. The school adopted "Byrnes" as part of its name 2012 when Trinity Collegiate School and Byrnes Academy merged. “The re-identification as Trinity Collegiate School better reflects the current student body, faculty and school mission, and the board believes this decision is in the best long-term interest of the students, families, faculty and alumni, as well as for the continued success of the school as a whole,” said Dr. William Naso, the board's chairman.

Over the past five years, the school has made strides to become more inclusive and welcoming to all families in the broader community. Students of color make up 31% of the school's overall enrollment, one of the highest among all South Carolina Independent School Association members (SCISA).

=== Merger ===
In 2012, Trinity Collegiate School and The Byrnes Schools began discussions about a possible merger. The leadership of both schools believed that by combining enrollment, the "new" school would provide better educational and extracurricular opportunities for students and make the new school one of the premier private institutions in the state.

The new school, now named Trinity Collegiate School, began its first year on August 20, 2012 at Trinity Collegiate School's Hoffmeyer Road campus. Most (around 80 out of 90-100) of the grade-eligible Byrnes students enrolled at Trinity, bringing the school's total enrollment to 195, and several Byrnes teachers and administrators joined the staff, including Byrnes' Middle School Dean, Teri Geddings. For the 2012-2013 school year, the school had a 6th grade to ease the transition of Byrnes students to Trinity, but reverted to grades 7-12 for the 2013-2014 school year. As a result of the merger, the larger school was able to offer more Advanced Placement courses, a more well-rounded arts program, and a more extensive athletic program. In 2014 and 2017, two more academic buildings were completed to accommodate the school's growing enrollment. The buildings include classrooms, science labs, seminar rooms, and a new dining hall.

At the start of the 2021-2022 school year, enrollment surpassed 400 students in grades 6-12 for the first time in the school's history. In the 2020-2021 school year, Trinity Collegiate permanently added a 6th grade after Florence and Darlington County school districts announced plans to change middle schools to grades 6-8.

== Academics ==
Trinity Collegiate School is a college preparatory school that has a rigorous and flexible course schedule for each student. TCS requires each student to take at least one of each of the core classes (math, science, history/geography, English). Each student must also take at least one foreign language. The school offers Latin, French, and Spanish. 19 Advanced Placement courses are also offered.

English

English 7, English 1, English 2, English 3, English 4, American Literature, British Literature, Young Adult Literature, AP Literature, AP Language, Film Studies 1, Film Studies 2, Public Speaking (Dual Credit).

Mathematics

Math 7, Math 8, Pre-Algebra, Algebra 1, Geometry, Algebra 2, Pre-Calculus, AP Calculus AB (BC), and AP Statistics.

History/Social Studies

World Geography, United States History, South Carolina History, World History, Modern European History, Economics, U.S. Government, Modern Middle East & European History, Global Studies, Comparative World Religions, AP Psychology, AP Comparative International Government, AP US Government, AP European History, AP US History, AP Art History, and AP Human Geography.

Science

Earth Science, Physical Science, Biology, Chemistry, Physics, Forensic Science 1 and 2, Anatomy & Physiology, Marine Biology, AP Biology, AP Chemistry, AP Environmental Science, AP Physics

Arts

TCS emphasizes the fine arts. The school offers drama, art, and music as electives.

- Middle & High School Drama (Pre-AP)
- Middle & High School Dance (Pre-AP)
- Middle & High School Music (Pre-AP)
- Studio Art 1
- Pre-AP Studio Art
- Photography
- AP Studio Art

Technology

TCS is moving towards more technology-related electives. They offer Robotics, iForce, Computer Science Concepts and Practices, AP Computer Science Principles, AP Computer Science A, Film Studies 1 and 2, Cinematography, Yearbook.

Others

Economics (S) Government (S), AP Microeconomics, and AP Macroeconomics.

== Athletics ==
Trinity has one of the top athletic programs in SCISA. The school is in SCISA Class 3A. Trinity Collegiate School's athletic goal is to educate student-athletes who show sportsmanship and perseverance. TCS offers 16 sports at the Varsity and Junior Varsity level. Every student is expected but not required to participate in at least one sport.

- Girls' Sports: Cross Country, Lacrosse, Varsity and JV Volleyball, Cheerleading, Swimming, Tennis, JV and Varsity Basketball, Soccer, Track, Varsity and JV Softball, Sporting Clays, Equestrian.
- Boys' Sports: Cross Country, Lacrosse, Varsity and JV Football, Swimming, Middle School and JV and Varsity Basketball, Soccer, Tennis, Varsity and JV Baseball, Sporting Clays, Golf.
