= Mayo High School for Math, Science, and Technology =

Location
- 405 Chestnut Street; Darlington, South Carolina; United States
- Coordinates: 34.2925°N 79.869°W

Information
- Type: Public
- Motto: "Hard Work Pays Off"
- School district: Darlington County School District
- CEEB code: 410626
- Principal: Stephania Lenard
- Teaching staff: 24.00 (FTE)
- Grades: 9 to 12
- Gender: Coeducational
- Enrollment: 343 (2023–2024)
- Student to teacher ratio: 14.29
- Campus: Suburban/Rural
- Colors: Hunter Green and Navy Blue
- Mascot: Phoenix
- Accreditation: AdvancED and South Carolina Department of Education
- Publication: Bennu
- Newspaper: The Phoenix
- Yearbook: Dimensions
- Website: Mayo High School for MST website

Mayo High School for Math, Science, and Technology is a magnet high school located in Darlington, South Carolina. The school educates about 340 students in grades 9 to 12 in the Darlington County School District.

== History ==
Mayo High School was built around 1950 as an African-American school. It was named for Dr. Amory Dwight Mayo, a minister and educator.

At the order of a judge to become desegregated, Mayo was renovated and became a magnet school in 1996. It was named for Dr. Dwight Mayo, an educator.

Mayo High School earned a silver medal in the U.S. News/School Matters Best High Schools rankings. Their most recent award is being recognized as a Palmetto's Finest School.
