= South Carolina Independent School Association =

The South Carolina Independent School Association (SCISA) is a school accrediting organization. It was founded in South Carolina in 1965 to legitimize segregation academies.

== History ==
SCISA was founded on August 10, 1965 with seven member schools and provided organizational support to new segregation academies similar to that provided by White Citizens Councils in Mississippi, and had already founded 26 segregation academies by the spring of 1966. Its first executive director was Tom Turnipseed. Turnipseed admitted that SCISA was founded to support a white-only education system. "We denied it had anything to do with integration, but it did. It was fear. It was racism." SCISA was founded as a "haven for segregation academies" but by 1990, according to then executive director Larry Watt, the "great majority" of SCISA's then 70 member schools were no longer segregated by race. Another founder, T.E. Wannamaker also stated that the organization was a response to mass integration and that "Many (Negroes) are little more than field hands."

== Athletics ==
SCISA governs student athletics for its member institutions. Fall sports include Cheerleading, Cross Country, Football, Swimming, Volleyball, Girls Golf, and Girls Tennis. Winter sports include, Archery, Basketball, Bowling, Scholastic Shooting Sports, and Wrestling. Spring sports include, Baseball, Chess, Equestrian, Golf, Lacrosse, Sailing, Soccer, Softball, Speed and Strength, Track, and Boys Tennis.

== Structure ==
SCISA is structured into 3 divisions, based on school population and size of teams. The levels, from smallest population to largest, are A, AA, and AAA. A and AA sports are further split into 2 regions each, while AAA competes without region differences. As recently as 2022, some have described the structure as continuing to perpetuate racial segregation.
