= Ann Head =

American novelist (1915–1968)

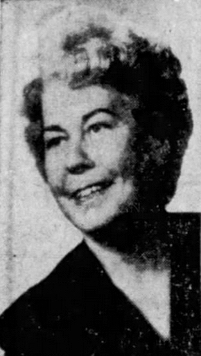
- Born: Anne Wales Christensen; October 30, 1915 Beaufort, South Carolina
- Died: May 7, 1968 (aged 52) Beaufort, South Carolina
- Occupation: Writer
- Genre: Romantic fiction; mystery; young adult
- Years active: 1945–1967
- Notable works: Mr. and Mrs. Bo Jo Jones

Ann Head (née Anne Wales Christensen) (1915 – 1968) was an American fiction writer whose work was regularly published in magazines including Redbook, Cosmopolitan, Good Housekeeping, McCall's, Ladies Home Journal, and others during the 1940s, 1950s and 1960s.

She wrote at least nine novels and two serial novels that were published in magazines, four of which were also published as books, and at least 50 published short stories. Her most famous work, Mr. and Mrs. Bo Jo Jones, a novel about a teen pregnancy, was made into a TV movie and stayed in print for four decades.

She was a mentor to novelist Pat Conroy after teaching him when he was a senior in high school.

== Early life and education ==
Head was born on October 30, 1915, in Beaufort, South Carolina. Her father was Niels Christensen Jr., who owned the Beaufort Gazette newspaper from 1903 to 1922 and served in the South Carolina Senate from 1905 to 1925, and her mother was Katherine (Nancy) Wales Stratton Christensen, from Boston. Head grew up in Beaufort and attended the school founded by her paternal grandmother, Abbie Holmes Christensen, an abolitionist who moved from Boston to Beaufort and started the Port Royal Agricultural School, known locally as the Shanklin School, to educate freed slaves after the Union army occupied Beaufort early in the Civil War. Her grandfather, Niels Christensen, was a Union soldier in the Civil War and served as superintendent of the Beaufort National Cemetery from 1870 to 1876.

Head had three siblings — a younger sister, Andrea (Andy) Christensen Rawson, who became a published poet in her later years; a younger brother, Stratton Christensen, [6]

was the youngest man ever elected to the South Carolina legislature before he was lost at sea while serving as a Navy ensign in June 1942; and an older brother, Niels Christensen III.

In her adolescence, she was sent to Boston to live with her maternal grandparents Solomon Piper Stratton and Annie Wales Stratton and to attend The Cambridge School, though she spent her summers and vacations in Beaufort with her family. Head was a writer from an early age, and completed her first book at age 8. After graduating from high school, she attended Antioch College, Ohio, and studied social work, as part of which she had work experience in an orphanage, a hospital and a reformatory. She was already working as a freelance writer when she met her first husband, engineer and inventor Howard Head, in December 1938. They married on February 26, 1939, and had a daughter. Head divorced her husband in 1944, and later married physician Stanley F. Morse, with whom she had a second daughter.

== Career ==
Head sold her first piece of fiction to Cosmopolitan when she was 28. After her first marriage ended, she continued to write to support herself and her daughter. In 1946, Cosmopolitan used Head's name in their advertisements promoting the magazine to women readers as "filled with the world's greatest emotional writing", saying, "she [the reader] is newly aware of the wonder and beauty of living, thanks to a beautifully told story by Ann Head"; "Ann Head's new story in Cosmopolitan Magazine has stirred her impressionable mind."

Head wrote short stories, novelettes, and serials with "charm and gaiety" for magazines such as the Saturday Evening Post, Collier's, Ladies Home Journal, Redbook, McCall's, and Good Housekeeping. Her goal was to write one story a month in hopes of selling at least three per year.

When the fiction magazine market dried up in the late 1950s she turned to writing books and had four novels published. Her books were published in hard cover and then paperback in many countries. McGraw-Hill, the publishers of her first novel, Fair with Rain (1957), promoted it by sending to book review editors an engraved invitation to the wedding of Angela to David Blair, followed by a handwritten postcard informing them that the wedding was off, and finally, a copy of the novel with a covering letter from a McGraw-Hill representative. The novel is written in the first person, from the point of view of Janet Blair, a mother of four children, the oldest of whom (David) is away at college, and writes to say he is bringing a girl (Angela) home. One reviewer, comparing Head to Betty MacDonald, described it as "a book full of sharp humor, very well assembled", although he thought that Head wrote with "a rambling style". Other reviewers said the book "maintains a light, swift pace ... breezily omitting all dull details"; "Ann Head's humor is ingratiating, and she writes of family life with a whimsicality that never descends to ickiness"; "recommended when you feel like meeting a pleasant and shrewdly observed family".

Although Fair with Rain received positive reviews, one reviewer felt that Head's second novel, Always in August (Doubleday, 1961), was a "vast improvement". Set on a plantation in South Carolina, it is told retrospectively in the first person by the main character, Lucy. Reviewers described it as "a tense romance" with "a good bit of drama .. and several hankies-ful of tears"; "primarily a romance but with a nicely sustained quality of suspense throughout." It received a largely positive response, although one critic said it had "a prosaic plot, written in a stilted style." Other reviewers found some faults: one reviewer considered the heroine "an apologetic door-mat [who] loses admiration if not sympathy by her whimpering", while another thought the villain, Gloria, was unconvincing, saying, "there just doesn't seem to be that much substance there." It was recommended to those who "enjoy entertainment mildly flavoured with tragedy", and its author was described as "skilled in descriptive ability and in setting atmospheres", who "writes of [the South] with [] love and understanding."

Everyone Adored Cara (Doubleday, 1963)

Mr. and Mrs. Bo Jo Jones (Putnam, 1967) became her best-known work and was made into a movie for television in 1971. It was first published as an adult novel, and shortly afterwards marketed towards adolescents. In the early 1970s, Mr. and Mrs. Bo Jo Jones was included in the curricula and libraries of some schools, and was popular as an ' "adolescent novel" ... dealing with adolescent problems.' There were some calls to remove it from schools due to its subject matter. It was republished by Signet Books and was in print until recently.

Head taught a creative writing class at Beaufort High School, where she mentored a student named Pat Conroy, who later became a famous novelist. The two spent much time together, and Conroy's autobiography included a chapter about Ann titled "Cookbook (My First Novelist)", noting, “Every time I sell a book, I put a rose on her grave.”

== Death ==
Head died suddenly May 7, 1968, after a cerebral aneurysm at age 52. She was buried the next day at the Parish Church of St. Helena in Beaufort.

== Legacy ==
Ann Head was posthumously inducted into the South Carolina Literary Hall of Fame 32.

In 2019, Ann Head's oldest daughter, Nancy Head Thode, established the Ann Head Literary Prize for Short Story Fiction at Beaufort High School. The prize is intended to encourage young writers much as Ann Head did in her original creative writing class. The prize provides a cash award as well as recognition of the young author at the annual Pat Conroy Literary Festival.

A biography of Ann Head was published by Evening Post Books in March 2025: Ahead of Her Time: The Trailblazing Life and Literary Legend of Ann Head was written by her daughter Nancy Head Thode. In 2026 the book was an Ippy Award Silver Medal Winner - Biography.

== Published works ==
=== Novels (Books) ===
- Fair With Rain (McGraw-Hill, 1957)
- Always In August (Doubleday, 1961)
- Everybody Adored Cara (Doubleday, 1963)
- Mr. And Mrs. Bo Jo Jones (Putnam, 1967)

=== Novels (Published in magazines) ===
- "Farewell to Innocence" (Redbook, September 1951)
- "All Through the Night" (McCall's, September 1953)
- "A Little World All Her Own" (McCall's, November 1954)
- "What Do They See in Each Other?' (Companion, December 1956)
- "David’s New Girl (Fair With Rain)" (Ladies Home Journal, April 1957)
- "I Am Watching You" (McCall's, November 1957)
- "Always In August" (McCall's, August 1961)
- "Everybody Adored Cara" (Redbook, April 1963)
- "Mr. And Mrs. Bo Jo Jones" (Good Housekeeping, October 1966)

=== Novellas ===
- "The Lost and The Found" (Good Housekeeping, April 1960)

=== Short stories ===
- "Carrot Top" (Cosmopolitan, January 1945)
- "The Impossible Journey" (Cosmopolitan, February 1945)
- "The Lady and the Guy" (McCall's, July 1945)
- "The Captain’s Wife" (McCall's, September 1945)
- "The Flowers That Bloom in the Spring" (Cosmopolitan, November 1945)
- "Only To Return" (McCall's, November 1945)
- "Out of Order" (Cosmopolitan, March 1946)
- "Found: A Woman" (Good Housekeeping, July 1947)
- "New Memory" (W.H. Companion, May 1948)
- "This Stranger, His Wife" (McCall's, February 1950)
- "Answer to Three Prayers" (McCall's, November 1950)
- "The Inner Circle" (McCall's, February 1951)
- "The Honeymoon Must Wait" (McCall's, January 1953)
- "Widow’s Mite" (Cosmopolitan, January 1953)
- "Only Once a Bride" (McCall's, June 1953)
- "John Says" (Redbook, January 1954)
- "And No One Answered" (McCall's, July 1955)
- "Since You Went Away" (Britannia and Eve, September 1955)
- "Let the Bell Ring" (McCall's, January 1959)
- "Portrait of Elizabeth" (Good Housekeeping, October 1959)
- "The End of Innocence (Lie)" (Good Housekeeping, October 1967)

=== Serials ===
- "The Cynthia Legend" " (McCall's, Part I, September 1952; Part II, October 1952)
- "House of Terror" (Saturday Evening Post, Part 1, Jan 16, 1954; Part 2, Jan 23, 1954; Part 3, Jan 30, 1954)
