= Bluffton High School =

Bluffton High School may refer to:

- Bluffton High School (Indiana), located in Bluffton, Indiana
- Bluffton High School (Ohio), located in Bluffton, Ohio
- Bluffton High School (South Carolina), located in Bluffton, South Carolina
