= May River High School =

Location
- 601 New Riverside Road; Bluffton, South Carolina 29910; United States; 32°12′58″N 80°58′21″W

Information
- Type: Public high school
- Motto: "Tradition Starts Here"
- Opened: 2016 (10 years ago)
- School district: Beaufort County School District
- Superintendent: Frank Rodriguez
- CEEB code: 410003
- Principal: Carrie Carter
- Faculty: 109.50 (FTE)
- Grades: 9–12
- Enrollment: 1,665 (2023-2024)
- Student to teacher ratio: 15.21
- Campus type: Suburban
- Colors: Royal blue and black
- Mascot: Shark
- Rival: Bluffton High School
- Website: mrhs.beaufortschools.net

May River High School is a public high school within the Beaufort County School District, located in Bluffton, South Carolina, United States. The school was opened in 2016 as a reliever to neighboring Bluffton High School, as a result of new growth and development. The school district is the southernmost district in Beaufort County. A larger K–12 campus is being constructed in the area.

== Athletics ==
May River High School competes at the Class AAAA level in the South Carolina High School League, moving up from their previous AAA classification in 2020. The school fields teams for boys in football, wrestling, basketball, swimming, cross country, track & field, tennis, golf, soccer, and lacrosse; and for girls in cheerleading, volleyball, basketball, swimming, cross country, soccer, track & field, tennis, and golf.

May River is a rival of Bluffton High School.

State championships:

- 2019: boys' soccer
- 2019: boys' track & field
- 2019: boys' cross country
- 2020: girls' golf
- 2021: girls’ golf
- 2023: girls’ golf
- 2024: girls’ golf
- 2024: wrestling
- 2025: wrestling

== See also ==
- Beaufort County School District
