= Bluffton High School (South Carolina) =

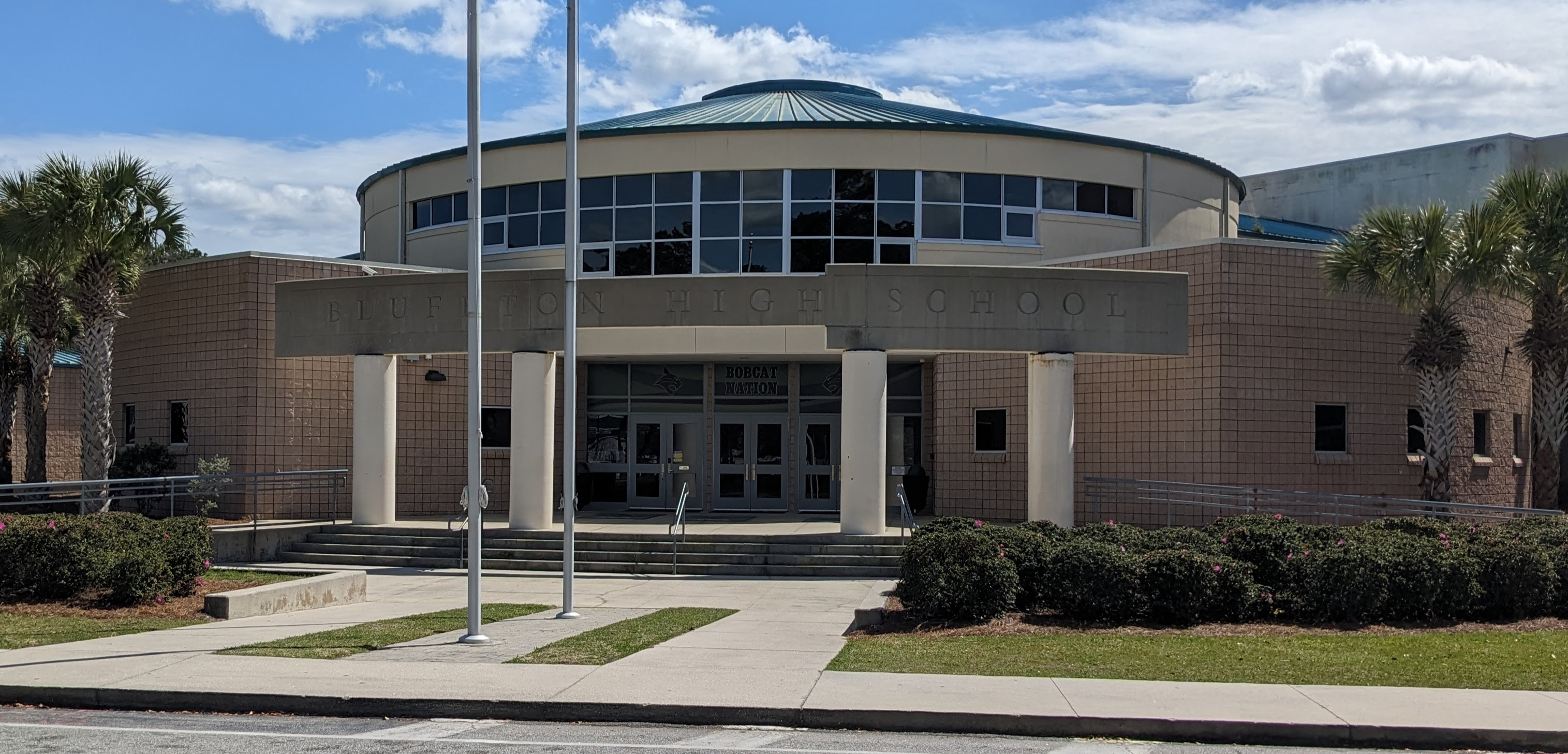

Location
- 12 H.E. McCracken Cir. Bluffton, South Carolina 29910; United States
- Coordinates: 32°15′06″N 80°53′56″W

Information
- Type: Public high school
- School district: Beaufort County School District
- Superintendent: Asa Haskins
- CEEB code: 410206
- Principal: Coach Bonneville
- Teaching staff: 92.00 (FTE)
- Grades: 9–12
- Enrollment: 1,375 (2024-2025)
- Student to teacher ratio: 14.95
- Campus size: 60 acres (24 ha)
- Campus type: Suburban
- Colors: Green and black
- Mascot: Bobcat
- Rival: Beaufort High School, May River High School
- Feeder schools: Bluffton Middle; H.E. McCracken Middle; Bluffton Elementary; M.C. Riley Elementary; Pritchardville Elementary; Red Cedar Elementary
- Website: blhs.beaufortschools.net

Bluffton High School is a public high school within the Beaufort County School District, located in Bluffton, South Carolina, United States. Opened in 2004 as a result of new growth and development, the high school serves students in the mainland areas of southern Beaufort County, including Bluffton, Pritchardville, and Okatie. It shares a larger K–12 campus with H.E. McCracken Middle School and Bluffton Elementary School. The school was honored in 2012 and 2013 by The Washington Post High School Challenge Index as one of "America's Most Challenging High Schools".

== Academics ==
Student take eight classes a year on an A/B block schedule. Four classes a day are taken, and alternate between schedules. The school uses the State of South Carolina's uniform grading scale where an A is 100–90, a B is 89–80, a C is 79–70, a D is 69–60, and an F is 59–0.

== Athletics ==
Bluffton High School competes at the Class AAAA level in the South Carolina High School League. The school fields teams for boys in football, wrestling, basketball, swimming, cross country, track & field, tennis, golf, soccer, and lacrosse; and for girls in cheerleading, volleyball, basketball, swimming, cross country, soccer, track & field, tennis, lacrosse, and golf.

In 2009 and 2011, the girls' golf team won a state title.

In 2011, the football team made it to the AAA state final.

In 2017, the boys' soccer team reached the AAA state final.

Bluffton High School is a rival of May River High School.
