= Dee Delaney =

American football player (born 1995)

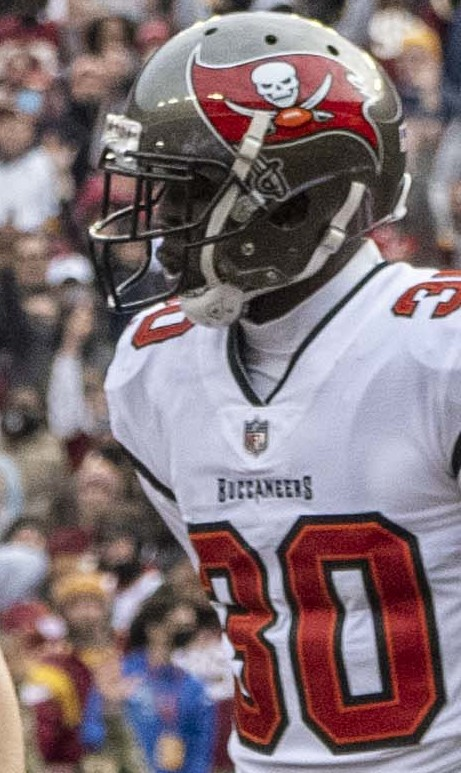
- Delaney with the Tampa Bay Buccaneers in 2021

Profile
- Position: Safety

Personal information
- Born: February 20, 1995 (age 31); Beaufort, South Carolina, U.S.
- Listed height: 5 ft 11 in (1.80 m)
- Listed weight: 200 lb (91 kg)

Career information
- High school: Whale Branch High School (Seabrook, South Carolina)
- College: The Citadel (2013–2016); Miami (FL) (2017)
- NFL draft: 2018: undrafted

Career history
- Jacksonville Jaguars (2018); Miami Dolphins (2018); New York Jets (2019)*; Washington Redskins (2019); Tampa Bay Buccaneers (2021–2023); Buffalo Bills (2024)*; Dallas Cowboys (2024)*; Michigan Panthers (2025)
- * Offseason or practice squad member only

Awards and highlights
- First-team FCS All-American (2016); Second-team FCS All-American (2015); 2× First-team All-SoCon (2015, 2016)

Career NFL statistics as of 2024
- Total tackles: 71
- Pass deflections: 7
- Interceptions: 3
- Stats at Pro Football Reference

Dee Delaney (born February 20, 1995) is an American former professional football player who was a safety for six seasons in the National Football League (NFL). He played college football for the The Citadel Bulldogs and Miami Hurricanes. Delaney currently works as the head coach for his alma mater Whale Branch high school's football team.

== Early life ==
A native of Beaufort, South Carolina, he attended Whale Branch Early College High School where he earned 14 varsity letters in football, basketball, baseball and track. As a wide receiver and kick returner he was named Region Offensive Player of the Year as a senior and invited to play in the North-South All Star Game. He was also an All-Region selection in basketball and baseball as well as being a member of the first place 4x100 relay team on the Class A state championship track team.

== College career ==
=== The Citadel ===
Delaney began his collegiate career at The Citadel, where he was a 3-year starter and 3-time All-Southern Conference selection as well as a 2-time Walter Camp Football Championship Subdivision (FCS) All-American; he was also named to the Associated Press FCS All-America team and garnered All-America honors from College Football Madness, STATS, Athlon and HERO. His 13 interceptions rank second in school history.

=== Miami ===
After graduation, Delaney used his final year of eligibility to play for the University of Miami as a graduate student; he started six games, collecting one interception and a fumble recovery as the Hurricanes advanced to the Atlantic Coast Conference Championship Game and played Wisconsin in the Capital One Orange Bowl.

== Professional career ==
Pre-draft measurables
Height	Weight	Arm length	Hand span	40-yard dash	10-yard split	20-yard split	20-yard shuttle	Three-cone drill	Vertical jump	Broad jump	Bench press
5 ft 11 1/2 in (1.82 m)	200 lb (91 kg)	30 1/2 in (0.77 m)	9 3/4 in (0.25 m)	4.46 s	1.57 s	2.63 s	4.25 s	6.95 s	32.5 in (0.83 m)	10 ft 0 in (3.05 m)	13 reps
All values from NFL Combine

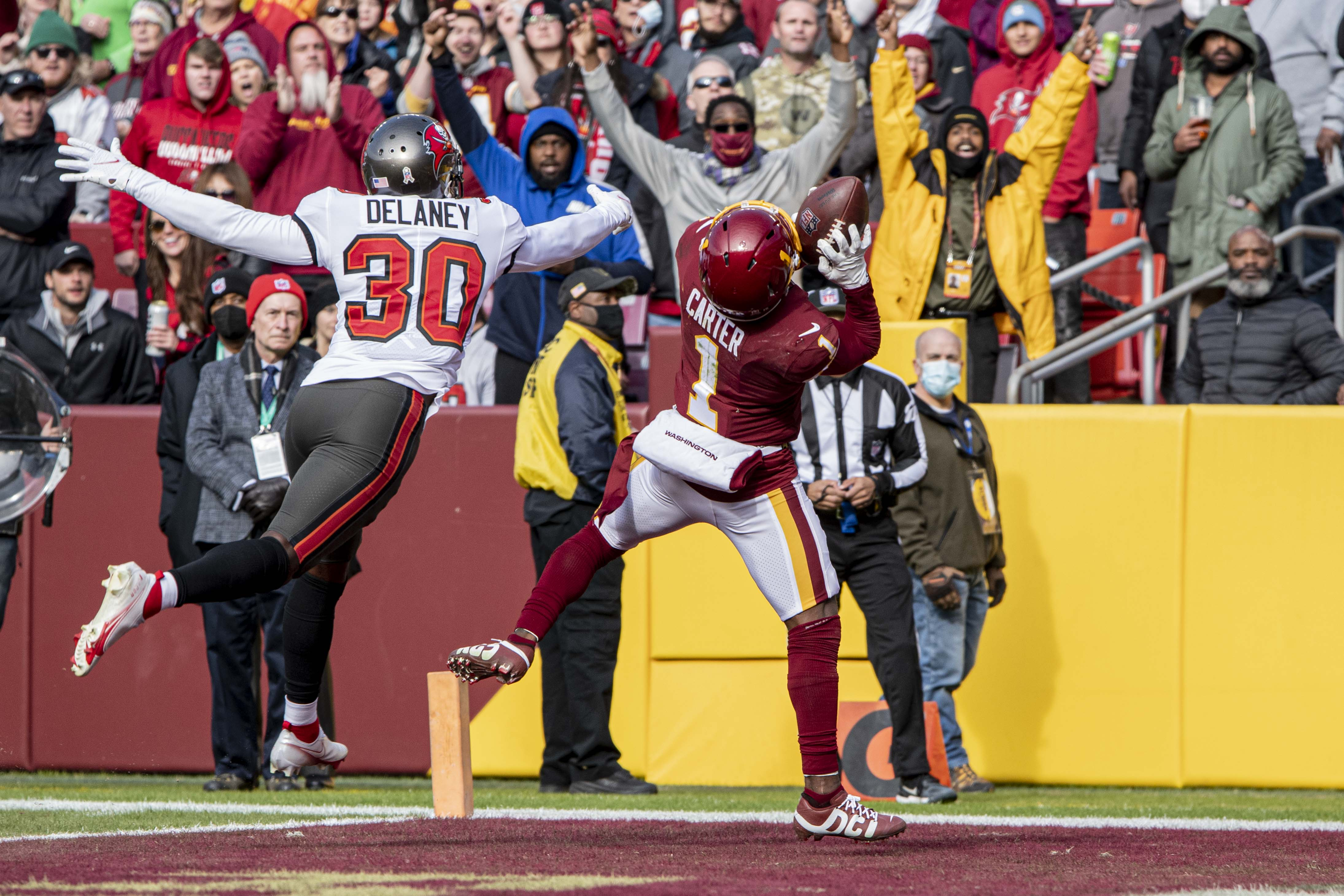
Delaney playing against the Washington Football Team in 2021

=== Jacksonville Jaguars ===
Delaney signed with the Jacksonville Jaguars as an undrafted free agent on April 28, 2018. He failed to make the Jaguars' 53-man roster out of training camp, but was subsequently signed to the team's practice squad on September 2. Delaney was promoted to the Jaguars' active roster from the practice squad on October 25, 2018. Delaney made his NFL debut on October 28, 2018, against the Philadelphia Eagles at Wembley Stadium in London. He was waived by the Jaguars on November 13, 2018, and was re-signed to the practice squad. He was promoted back to the active roster on December 1, 2018. He was waived two days later.

=== Miami Dolphins ===
On December 4, Delaney was claimed off waivers by the Miami Dolphins, but was waived four days later and re-signed to the practice squad. He signed a reserve/future contract with the Dolphins on February 1, 2019 He was waived on May 1, 2019.

=== New York Jets ===
On July 30, 2019, Delaney was signed by the New York Jets. Delaney was waived by the Jets on August 26, 2019.

=== Washington Redskins ===
On December 24, 2019, Delaney was signed by the Washington Redskins. He was released on March 23, 2020.

=== Tampa Bay Buccaneers ===
On May 25, 2021, Delaney signed with the Tampa Bay Buccaneers. He had his first start as a professional on October 24, 2021, against the Chicago Bears and he caught his first career interception in that game.

=== Buffalo Bills ===
On May 16, 2024, Delaney signed with the Buffalo Bills. He was placed on injured reserve on August 25, and released a week later.

=== Dallas Cowboys ===
On December 4, 2024, Delaney was signed to the Dallas Cowboys practice squad.

=== Michigan Panthers ===
On June 3, 2025, Delaney signed with the Michigan Panthers of the United Football League (UFL).
