= Battery Creek High School =

Location
- 1 Blue Dolphin Drive; Beaufort, South Carolina 29906; United States
- Coordinates: 32°25′59″N 80°44′46″W

Information
- Type: Public high school
- School district: Beaufort County
- Superintendent: Frank Rodriguez
- CEEB code: 410260
- Principal: TBA
- Teaching staff: 74.50 (FTE)
- Grades: 9–12
- Enrollment: 829 (2023-2024)
- Student to teacher ratio: 11.13
- Campus size: 35 acres (14 ha)
- Campus type: Suburban
- Colors: Gold and navy blue
- Mascot: Dolphin
- Rival: Beaufort High School
- Communities served: Marine Corps Air Station Beaufort
- Feeder schools: Beaufort Middle School, Robert Smalls International Academy
- Website: bchs.beaufortschools.net

Battery Creek High School (BCHS) is a public high school within the Beaufort County School District, located in Beaufort, South Carolina, United States. The school serves students in suburban areas of Beaufort, St. Helena, and Lady's Island. It enrolled 757 students in the 2011–2012 school year.

Battery Creek High School is the zoned public high school for on-base properties of Marine Corps Air Station Beaufort.

== Academics ==
In 2012, the average student-teacher ratio in core subjects was 26.7 students for every 1 teacher. Battery Creek High School is accredited by the Southern Association of Colleges and Schools.

The school's curriculum is divided into three academies: arts & humanities, health science & information technology, and military science & aeronautical engineering. In 2011, Battery Creek High School was designated as a military magnet high school by the Beaufort County School District, in which a slight majority of students are involved in the Marine Corps JROTC program.

== Athletics ==
Battery Creek High School competes at the Class AAA level in the South Carolina High School League. Battery Creek's major rival is the cross-town Beaufort High School.

== Feeder patterns ==
As MCAS Beaufort is in the boundary of Battery Creek High School, the school's feeder pattern includes the military elementary and middle schools covering the base property. the Department of Defense Education Activity (DoDEA) has two schools covering elementary and middle school for the base: Elliott Elementary School (PreKindergarten-Grade 2) and Bolden Elementary/Middle School (grades 3-8). High school students on the base then go to the county school district.

== Notable alumni ==
- Collin Drafts, former Arena Football League Football Player (QB) (2007-2013)
- Greg Jones, football, NFL
- James Saxon, football player and coach, National Football League (NFL)
