= Hilton Head Island High School =

Public high school in Hilton Head Island, South Carolina, United States

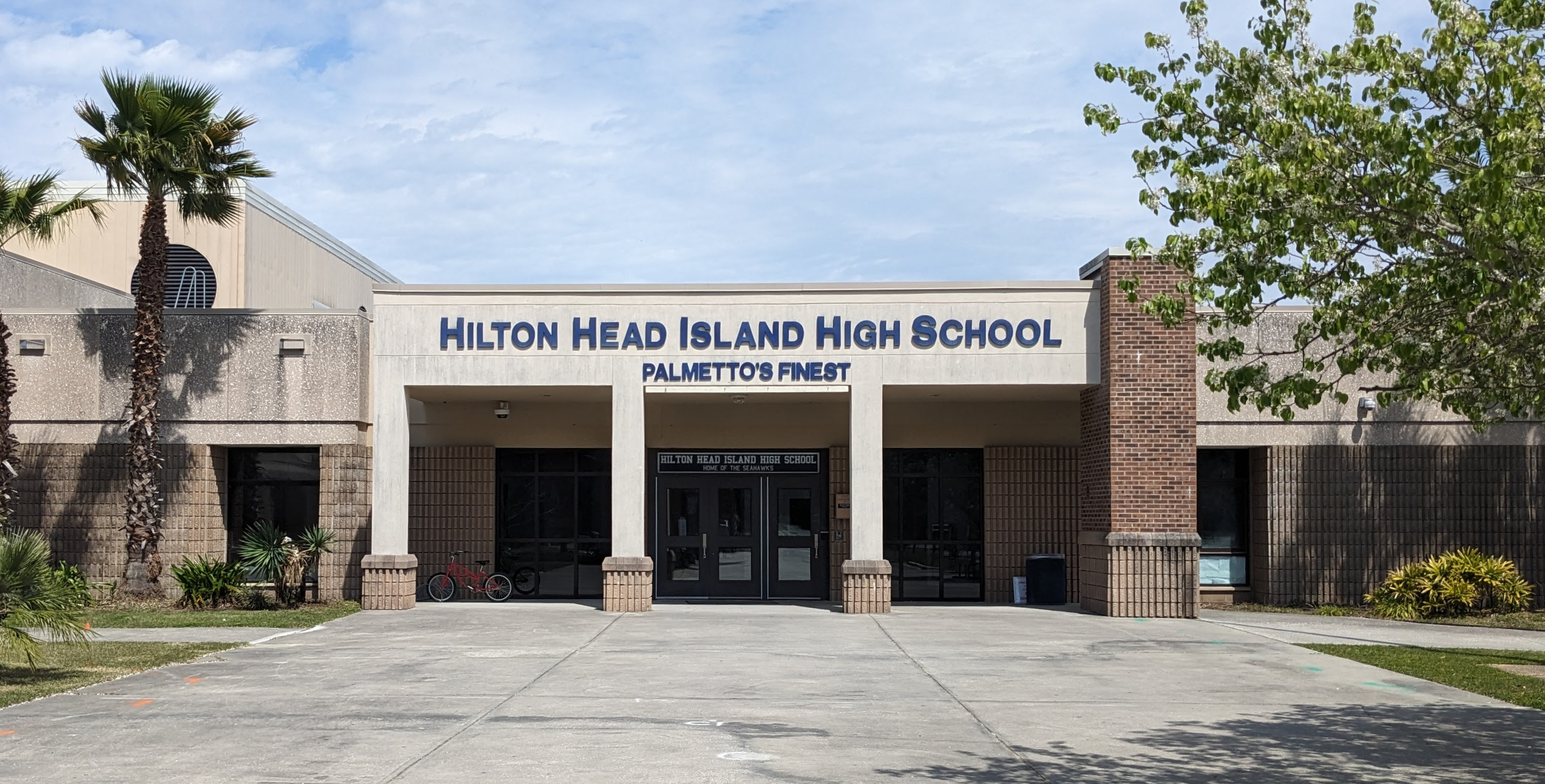
- Entrance to Hilton Head Island High School in 2024

Location
- 70 Wilborn Road; Hilton Head Island, South Carolina 29926; United States; 32.2193°N 80.7314°W

Information
- School type: Public high school
- Established: 1983
- School district: Beaufort County School District
- Superintendent: Frank Rodriguez
- CEEB code: 411033
- Principal: Steven Schidrich
- Teaching staff: 100.00 (FTE)
- Grades: 9–12
- Enrollment: 1,317 (2023-2024)
- Student to teacher ratio: 13.17
- Colors: Navy and light blue
- Mascot: Seahawk
- Feeder schools: H.H.I. Middle; H.H.I. Elementary; H.H.I. School for the Creative Arts
- Website: hhihs.beaufortschools.net

Hilton Head Island High School (shortened to Hilton Head High, HHIHS, or HHH) is a public high school within the Beaufort County School District, located in Hilton Head Island, South Carolina, United States. The school serves students on the island in addition to some students living in Bluffton through the Beaufort County School District "school choice program".

== History ==
The school was established in 1983 when its single-story building was constructed. In 2024, a project commenced to renovate the campus and replace the majority of its classroom facilities with a three-story classroom wing.

In May 2025, a 32-year-old dance teacher at Hilton Head Island High School was charged with sexual battery of a student after being placed on leave for an affair off-campus.

== Academics ==
Hilton Head Island High School is accredited by the Southern Association of Colleges and Schools. The school is partnered with the International Baccalaureate Programme.

== Athletics ==
Hilton Head Island High School competes at the Class AAAA level in the South Carolina High School League. The school fields teams for boys in football, wrestling, basketball, swimming, cross country, track & field, lacrosse, tennis, and golf; and for girls in cheerleading, volleyball, basketball, swimming, cross country, track & field, lacrosse, tennis, and golf. The Seahawks have won the S.C. Athletic Administrator Association's Carlisle Cup for eight consecutive years (up to the 2017–18 school year).

== Notable alumni ==
- Poona Ford, National Football League (NFL) football player for the Seattle Seahawks
- Sam Gilman, professional middle- and long-distance runner
- Ryan Kelly, baseball player
- Carmen Mlodzinski, Major League Baseball (MLB) player for the Pittsburgh Pirates
- Gaston Moore, football player
- Sean O'Haire, former professional wrestler and mixed martial artist
- Wayne Simmons, football player
- Jaylen Sneed, college football player for the Notre Dame Fighting Irish
- Brett Sylvia, Lieutenant General in the United States Army

== See also ==
- Beaufort County School District
