= Arthur K. Ladd =

- Born: November 1, 1890; Texas
- Died: December 13, 1935 (aged 45); Dale, South Carolina
- Burial place: Arlington National Cemetery
- Military career
- Allegiance: United States of America
- Branch: United States Army Air Corps; United States Army Air Service; Field Artillery Branch (United States)
- Service years: 1917–1935
- Rank: Major
- Commands: 17th Squadron (Pursuit)

Major Arthur K. Ladd, service number O-10097, was an officer and pilot in the United States Army Air Corps who died in a plane crash in South Carolina in 1935. He is the namesake of Ladd Army Airfield, formerly Fairbanks Air Base, Alaska, named in his honour on 1 December 1939.

== Background ==
Arthur K. Ladd was born in Texas, U.S., on 1 November 1890. He was commissioned a second lieutenant of field artillery, Reserve Corps, at age 27, on 27 November 1917. He left that service on 19 September 1920, and the same day was commissioned a second lieutenant in the Air Service.

"In July 1920, he received his commission as a second lieutenant in the Air Service while simultaneously being promoted to first lieutenant in the regular Army. Following completion of both pilot and observer training, Major Ladd spent several years serving in a variety of Air Service positions."

Ladd graduated from the Air Service's pilots' school in 1921, the Air Corps pursuit school the same year, and the Air Corps Tactical School in 1930.

1st Lieutenant Ladd commanded the 17th Squadron (Pursuit), 1st Pursuit Group, Ellington Field, Texas, 23 September 1921 - 23 November 1921.

By the mid-1930s, he was assigned at Maxwell Field, Alabama, where he was an instructor in logistics movements of troops and supplies in the Air Corps Tactical School.

Major Ladd was reassigned to Langley Field, Virginia, where he served as the assistant supply officer for the General Headquarters Air Force from its creation on 1 March 1935, working for Lt. Col. Joseph P. McNarney, supply officer of the GHQ force.

He had recently received an appointment to the Army War College at the Washington Barracks, Washington, D.C. He was rated as a pilot and an observer.

== Crash ==
On Friday the 13th of December 1935, Major Ladd was piloting Boeing P-12F, 32-100, c/n 1676, '60', the 24th of 25 of the model built, of the 36th Pursuit Squadron, from Langley Field to Miami, Florida, for the eighth annual All American air maneuvers, an air race and exhibition held 13–15 December. He had departed Langley on Thursday morning, 12 December, and had spent the night at Fort Bragg, North Carolina, apparently due to adverse weather. At ~1400 hrs. EST, the biplane fighter crashed into a swamp near the Wimbee River on Heyward Island, ~3 miles E of Dale, South Carolina, in Beaufort County. A front page news item in The State, Columbia, South Carolina, the next day, observed that the plane's two machine guns were badly broken.

"Major Ladd's body was badly mangled. Authorities from Parris Island removed the body about 5:30 o'clock this afternoon and carried it to Parris Island to await instructions. Major Ladd appeared to be between 40 and 55 years of age." (He was 45.) "Parris Island officers who visited the scene said they could not tell what caused the crash; neither did they know what Major Ladd's destination was, nor where he had come from. The orders he flew under were sealed, as is customary."

No funeral arrangements had been made by Friday night, 13 December. Ladd was survived by his parents, of Sherman, Texas, his widow, and a daughter, Miss Billie Ladd.

== Commemoration ==
Fairbanks Air Base, Fairbanks, Alaska, under construction since August 1939 after the United States Congress appropriated $4 million to build a cold-weather testing base, was renamed Ladd Army Airfield on 1 December 1939, by Major Dale V. Gaffney, the first commander, in memory of Major Arthur K. Ladd.

Ladd Elementary School, named for Major Ladd, is one of 19 elementary schools in the Fairbanks North Star Borough, Alaska.

Ladd Street, at Lackland Air Force Base, Texas, is named in his honour.
