= Dale, South Carolina =

Settlement in South Carolina, United States

Dale
- Census-designated place
- Interactive map of Dale
- Coordinates: 32°33′20″N 80°42′06″W
- Country: United States
- State: South Carolina
- County: Beaufort

Area
  - Total: 2.37 sq mi (6.14 km^{2})
  - Land: 2.37 sq mi (6.14 km^{2})
  - Water: 0 sq mi (0.00 km^{2})
- Elevation: 10 ft (3.0 m)

Population (2020)
  - Total: 633
  - Density: 266.9/sq mi (103.04/km^{2})
- Time zone: UTC-5 (Eastern (EST))
  - Summer (DST): UTC-4 (EDT)
- FIPS code: 45-18340
- GNIS feature ID: 2812937

Dale, South Carolina, is an unincorporated community and census-designated place (CDP) located in northern Beaufort County in the southern corner of the state of South Carolina, U.S.A. It was first listed as a CDP in the 2020 census with a population of 633.

It is located approximately five miles north of Beaufort, South Carolina on U.S. Route 21, designated the Trask Parkway in that area. The zip code for Dale, South Carolina, is 29914.

== History ==
=== Railroad ===
Dale was formerly on the alignment of the Seaboard Air Line Railroad's Carolina Division low-level main line, constructed from 1915 and opened December 31, 1917. This rail route passed to the Seaboard Coast Line Railroad with the July 1, 1967 merger of the SAL and longtime rival Atlantic Coast Line Railroad, becoming the Charleston Subdivision, and the line downgraded with most traffic rerouting over the former ACL alignment to the west. The "East Carolina Subdivision", as it was colloquially called, was abandoned by stages, with the first portion removed north of Dale, between Lobeco and Charleston, after October 1, 1967. Following the April 21, 1971 destruction of the old SAL lift bridge over the Savannah River by a ship in foggy conditions, the southern connection into Savannah was cut and the rail line removed between Coosaw and Pritchardville, south of Dale, in 1978. Most of the remaining line was lifted in 1982. Portions of the alignment have been converted into the New River Linear Trail hiking trail.

=== Incidents ===
On Friday December 13, 1935, Major Arthur K. Ladd, assigned as the assistant supply officer for the General Headquarters Air Force, Langley Field, Virginia, was piloting Boeing P-12F, 32-100, c/n 1676, '60', the 24th of 25 of the model built, of the 36th Pursuit Squadron, from Langley Field to Miami, Florida, and was killed, at ~1400 hrs. EST, when the biplane fighter crashed into a swamp near the Wimbee River on Heyward Island, ~3 miles E of Dale, South Carolina. A front-page news item in The State, Columbia, South Carolina, the next day, observed that the plane's two machine guns were badly broken. Fairbanks Air Base, Fairbanks, Alaska, under construction since August 1939 after the United States Congress appropriated $4 million to build a cold-weather testing base, was renamed Ladd Army Airfield on December 1, 1939, in Major Ladd's honor.

== Demographics ==
Historical population
Census	Pop.	Note	%±
2020	633		—
U.S. Decennial Census; 2020

Dale first appeared as a census designated place in the 2020 U.S. census.

=== 2020 census ===
Dale CDP, South Carolina – Racial and Ethnic Composition (NH = Non-Hispanic) Note: the US Census treats Hispanic/Latino as an ethnic category. This table excludes Latinos from the racial categories and assigns them to a separate category. Hispanics/Latinos may be of any race.
Race / Ethnicity	Pop 2020	% 2020
White alone (NH)	100	15.80%
Black or African American alone (NH)	491	77.57%
Native American or Alaska Native alone (NH)	2	0.32%
Asian alone (NH)	1	0.16%
Pacific Islander alone (NH)	0	0.00%
Other race alone (NH)	5	0.79%
Mixed race or Multiracial (NH)	16	2.53%
Hispanic or Latino (any race)	18	2.84%
Total	633	100.00%

== Notable resident ==
Dee Delaney, professional football safety for the Michigan Panthers
