= Tyler Clancy =

American politician (born 1997)

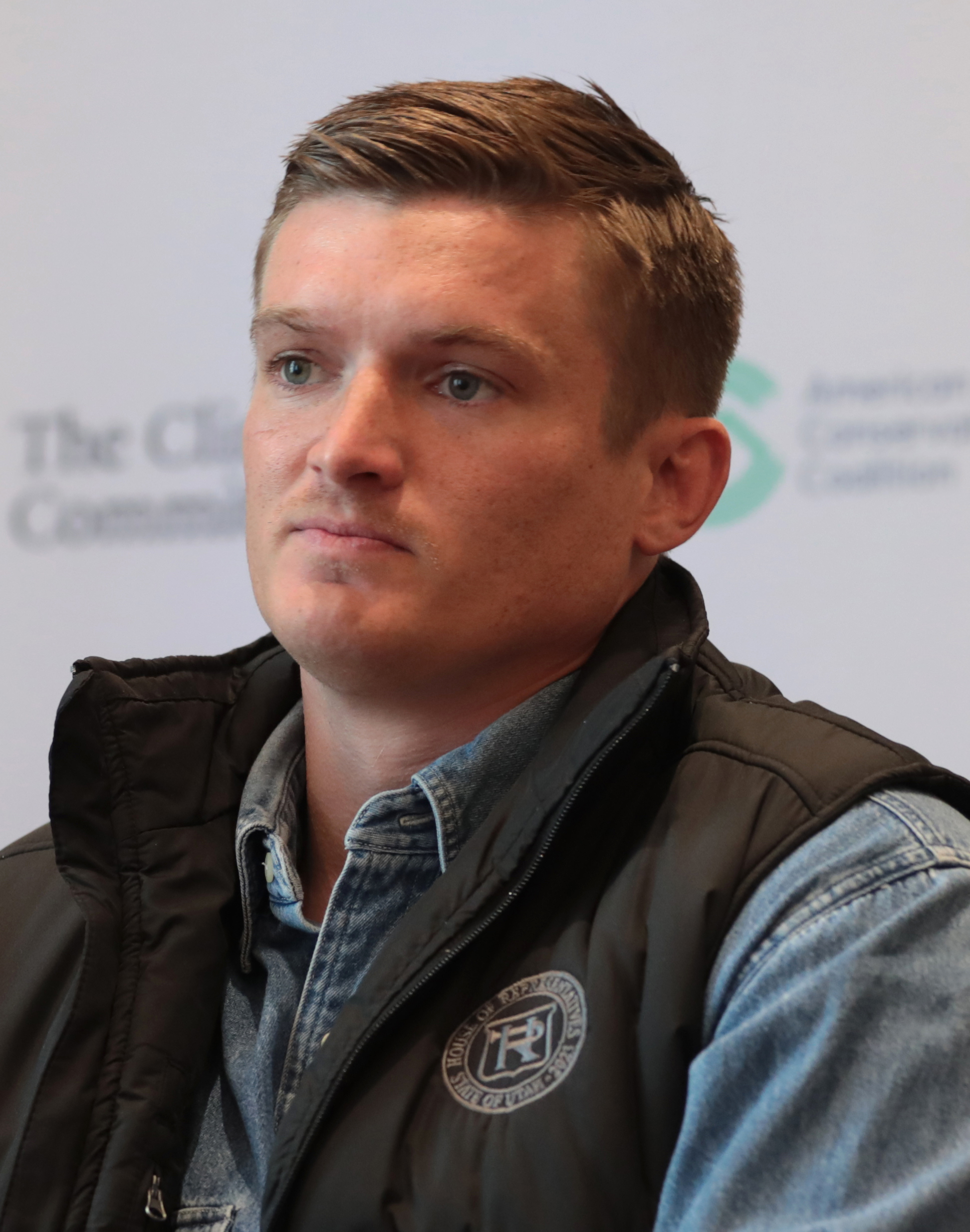

Member of the Utah House of Representatives from the 60th district
- In office January 17, 2023 – March 9, 2026
- Preceded by: Adam Robertson
- Succeeded by: Grant Pace

Personal details
- Born: Tyler James Clancy; February 19, 1997 (age 29) Beaufort, South Carolina, U.S.
- Party: Republican
- Spouse: Leah Davis (m. 2022)
- Education: Brigham Young University (BA)

Tyler James Clancy (/klənsi/; klen-sy born 1997) is an American politician and law enforcement officer who served as a member of the Utah House of Representatives for the 60th district, which includes the northern parts of Provo and Pleasant Grove. While serving he was among the youngest state legislators in the United States.

== Early life and education ==
Clancy was born in 1997 in Beaufort, South Carolina. His father was the chief of police for the Beaufort Police Department and a United States Marine Corps veteran. Clancy's mother was a public school teacher and he has one younger brother. He graduated from Beaufort High School in 2015, where he was elected student body president. He then moved to Provo, Utah, for his studies at Brigham Young University, where he was the captain of the men's lacrosse team and president of the BYU College GOP. Clancy graduated in 2021 with a Bachelor of Arts degree in family science.

== Career ==
In 2020, while still in college, Clancy began working on homelessness in Utah. He was hired as the executive director of the Pioneer Park Coalition, working to address homelessness, poverty, and public safety issues across the state. In that role, he advocated for interagency collaboration between state law enforcement and the US Attorney's Office which led to the creation of Project Safe Neighborhoods in 2021. Clancy also lobbied state leaders to support The Other Side Village, a tiny home community for individuals transitioning out of homelessness.

Since May 2022, Clancy has served as a police officer for the Provo Police Department.

In January 2023, Clancy was elected by the Utah County Republican Party Delegates to succeed resigned incumbent Adam Robertson. He assumed office on January 17, 2023. Clancy is a member of the Education Interim Committee, Executive Offices and Criminal Justice Appropriations Subcommittee, House Education Committee, House Judiciary Committee and the House Interim Committee. In his first term, he created the bipartisan Blue Collar Caucus with Representative Ashlee Matthews. Clancy is recognized as an effective lawmaker, having all of his bills passed through both chambers of the legislature and signed by the Governor in 2023.

During the 2024 Legislative Session, Clancy took on an initiative to reform Utah's Homeless Services. HB 298 eliminated a 29-person homelessness council, and replaced it with an 11 person board. The legislation also clarified that unsanctioned camping enforcement was a requirement for all Utah municipalities.

Clancy was an invited speaker to the 4th annual National Conservatism Conference where he spoke about "Wrestling the GOP Back from Corporate Influence". Clancy's views have been characterized by some pundits as populist due to his support for labor unions and opposition to centralization of corporate power.

Clancy resigned from the Utah House of Representatives in March 2026 after being appointed as Utah's homeless coordinator.

== Personal life ==
On September 13, 2022, Clancy married Leah Davis, in Provo, Utah.
