= Kevin Patrick (American football) =

American football coach (born 1971)

Biographical details
- Born: July 30, 1971 (age 55); Phoenix, Arizona, U.S.
- Education: University of Miami (1994)

Playing career
- 1989–1993: Miami (FL)
- Positions: Tight end, Defensive lineman, defensive end

Coaching career (HC unless noted)
- 1996–1998: South Florida (DE)
- 2008: South Florida (DE)
- 2009: South Florida (DL)
- 2010–2013: South Florida (DT)
- 2014–2015: North Texas (DL)
- 2016: Texas Tech (DL)
- 2017–2019: NC State (DL)
- 2020–2022: Florida Atlantic (OLB)
- 2023–2025: South Florida (DL)
- 2025: South Florida (interim HC/DL)

Head coaching record
- Overall: 0–1
- Bowls: 0–1

Accomplishments and honors

Awards
- Big East Conference Defensive Player of the Year (1993); Jack Harding University of Miami MVP Award (1993)

Kevin Patrick (born July 30, 1971) is an American football coach who most recently served as the interim head coach and defensive line coach for the South Florida Bulls.

== Playing career ==
Patrick played high school football at Forest Hill Community High School in West Palm Beach, Florida as a defensive lineman.

During his time at Miami, Patrick was one of the team's top players, where in his career he totaled 174 tackles and 23 sacks, where he helped lead them to a national championship, while also earning multiple honors such as being named an all-American, the Big East defensive player of the year, and he was inducted into the team's Hall of Fame in 2015.

At Miami, Patrick was the roommate of future actor and professional wrestler Dwayne Johnson.

== Coaching career ==
Patrick got his first career coaching job in 1996, as the defensive line coach for the inaugural season for the South Florida Bulls, where he would leave in 1998. He spent the next nine years outside of coaching; among other ventures, he founded a medical billing company. However, in 2008, he would return to South Florida once again as the team's defensive line coach. In 2014, he joined the North Texas Mean Green to coach the team's defensive line. Ahead of the 2016 season, Patrick was hired as the defensive line coach at Texas Tech. In 2017, he joined the NC State Wolfpack as the team's defensive line coach. Before the start of the 2020 season, Florida Atlantic, hired Patrick to coach the team's outside linebackers. In 2023, he rejoined the South Florida Bulls as the team's defensive line coach. On November 30, 2025, Patrick was named the Bulls interim head coach after Alex Golesh was hired by Auburn.

== Head coaching record ==
| Year | Team | Overall | Conference | Standing | Bowl/playoffs |
|---|---|---|---|---|---|
South Florida Bulls (American Conference) (2025)
| 2025 | South Florida | 0–1 | | | L Cure |
| South Florida: | | 0–1 | | | |
| Total: | | 0–1 | | | |
