= Beaufort High School =

Location
- 84 Sea Island Pkwy; Beaufort, South Carolina 29907; United States
- Coordinates: 32°24′55″N 80°39′38″W

Information
- Type: Public high school
- Motto: Go Eagles!
- Established: 1970
- School district: Beaufort County School District
- Superintendent: Frank Rodriguez
- CEEB code: 410120
- Principal: Ryan Walsh
- Teaching staff: 86.00 (FTE)
- Grades: 9–12
- Enrollment: 1,188 (2023-2024)
- Student to teacher ratio: 13.81
- Campus size: 40 acres (16 ha)
- Campus type: Suburban
- Colors: Green and white
- Mascot: Eagle
- Rival: Battery Creek High School
- Feeder schools: Beaufort Middle; Lady's Island Middle; Bolden Middle School; Beaufort Elementary; Coosa Elementary; Lady's Island Elementary; Port Royal Elementary; St. Helena Elementary
- Website: bhs.beaufortschools.net

Beaufort High School is a public high school within the Beaufort County School District, located in Beaufort, South Carolina, United States, on Lady's Island. The school serves students in downtown areas of Beaufort and Port Royal in addition to students living on Lady's Island and St. Helena Island.

== Academics ==
Beaufort High School is accredited by the Southern Association of Colleges and Schools.

In 2010, the "small schools" concept was adopted by Beaufort High School, in which learning academies were created to help foster students into their career paths. The school is split into four academies: Freshman Academy, International Studies, Arts, Communications, and Technologies, and Health Professions. In 2011, the "Everyday Math" and "Everyday English" programs were set in place for incoming freshmen students who scored in the lower third of their middle school competency exams.

The “small schools” concept was dissolved before the 2019-2020 school year, and replaced primarily by the magnet programs of AP Capstone, PTLW classes, and MedTech 7.

== Athletics ==
Beaufort High competes at the Class AAAA level in the South Carolina High School League. The school fields teams for boys in baseball, football, wrestling, basketball, swimming, cross country, track & field, tennis, and golf; and for girls in cheerleading, volleyball, basketball, swimming, cross country, track & field, tennis, softball and golf.

Beaufort's rival is cross-town Battery Creek High School, but due to the relegation of Battery Creek to Class AAA (as a result of declining enrollment and the opening of Whale Branch High School), the schools do not play each other at the same frequency as before.

== Notable alumni ==
- Tyler Clancy, law enforcement officer and politician
- Pat Conroy, best-selling novelist with many movies made from his books; was both a student and teacher at Beaufort High
- Candice Glover, singer, American Idol season 12 winner
- Boyce Green, National Football League (NFL) running back, Cleveland Browns, Kansas City Chiefs
- Scott Mullen, Major League Baseball (MLB) player
- Ron Parker, NFL player
- Devin Taylor, linebacker for the Detroit Lions
- Asher Wojciechowski, professional baseball player
