= Ryan Kelly (baseball) =

American baseball player (born 1987)

- Pitcher
- Born: October 30, 1987 (age 38); Hilton Head, South Carolina, U.S.
- Batted: Right Threw: Right

Professional debut
- MLB: June 30, 2015, for the Atlanta Braves
- CPBL: April 21, 2016, for the Uni-President Lions

Last appearance
- MLB: September 25, 2015, for the Atlanta Braves
- CPBL: May 29, 2016, for the Uni-President Lions

MLB statistics
- Win–loss record: 0–0
- Earned run average: 7.02
- Strikeouts: 10

CPBL statistics
- Win–loss record: 2–2
- Earned run average: 4.19
- Strikeouts: 20
- Stats at Baseball Reference

Teams
- Atlanta Braves (2015); Uni-President Lions (2016)
Medals
Men's baseball
Representing United States
Pan American Games
Silver medal – second place	2015 Toronto	Team

William Ryan Kelly (born October 30, 1987) is an American former professional baseball pitcher. He played in Major League Baseball (MLB) for the Atlanta Braves in 2015, and in the Chinese Professional Baseball League (CPBL) for the Uni-President Lions in 2016.

== Career ==
=== Early career ===
Kelly attended Hilton Head High School in Hilton Head, South Carolina, and Walters State Community College in Morristown, Tennessee.

=== Pittsburgh Pirates ===
The Pittsburgh Pirates selected Kelly in the 26th round of the 2006 Major League Baseball draft.

=== Texas Rangers ===
On December 23, 2010, Kelly was traded to the Oakland Athletics for in exchange for Corey Wimberly. On January 11, 2011, the Athletics traded him to the Texas Rangers in exchange for Guillermo Moscoso. Kelly spent the year with the High–A Myrtle Beach Pelicans, making 40 appearances and posting a 3.95 ERA with 64 strikeouts in 82.0 innings of work.

=== San Diego Padres ===
On December 21, 2011, the Rangers traded Kelly to the San Diego Padres for Luis Martinez. For the next two seasons, Kelly pitched in relief with the Texas League Champion Double–A San Antonio Missions and Triple–A Tucson Padres.

=== Atlanta Braves ===
Kelly signed as a free agent with the Atlanta Braves in November 2013. He was promoted to the major leagues on June 28, 2015. He made his major league debut on June 30 against the Washington Nationals, pitching one inning, in which he gave up one run on two hits, while recording a strikeout and a walk. He was released on March 5, 2016.

=== Uni-President 7-Eleven Lions ===
After his release from the Braves, Kelly signed with the Uni-President 7-Eleven Lions of the Chinese Professional Baseball League. In 15 appearances for the Lions, he compiled a 2–2 record and 4.19 ERA with 20 strikeouts and 3 saves over 19 1/3 innings pitched. Kelly was released by the team on June 15, 2016.

=== Vaqueros Laguna ===
On July 15, 2016, Kelly signed with the Vaqueros Laguna of the Mexican League. In 14 games for Laguna, he recorded a 4.38 ERA with 10 strikeouts across 12 1/3 innings pitched. Kelly was released by the Vaqueros on August 11.

=== Somerset Patriots ===
On April 6, 2017, Kelly signed with the Somerset Patriots of the Atlantic League. In 10 outings, Kelly compiled a 2.00 ERA with 16 strikeouts and 3 saves over 9 innings of work.

=== Seattle Mariners ===
On May 17, 2017, Kelly signed a minor league contract with the Seattle Mariners. He pitched in relief for the Triple-A Tacoma Rainiers & Double-A Arkansas Travelers, finishing the season with 2.97 ERA, 32 strikeouts in 30 1/3 innings, and a 0.86 WHIP with 6 saves. He elected free agency following the season on November 6.

Kelly continued putting up good numbers in 2017 when he signed on for the off-season first half with Cardenales de Lara in Liga Venezuela Beisbol Professional. He finished the half with a 1-1 record, 1.71 ERA, 21 innings pitched, .76 WHIP and 9 saves. Kelly again pitched for Cardenales de Lara in 2018 winter season and on November 20, 2018, converted his 19th consecutive save, a club record.

=== Somerset Patriots (second stint) ===
On March 28, 2018, Kelly signed with the Somerset Patriots of the Atlantic League of Professional Baseball. On July 14, Kelly earned his 100th professional career save with three strikeouts in the ninth inning to preserve the 3–1 Patriots victory. In 46 appearances out of the bullpen for Somerset, he accumulated a 3.16 ERA with 57 strikeouts and 23 saves across 42 2/3 innings pitched. Kelly became a free agent following the 2018 season.

=== Toros de Tijuana ===
On April 3, 2019, Kelly signed with the Toros de Tijuana of the Mexican League. In 10 games for Tijuana, he logged a 5.25 ERA with 11 strikeouts across 12 innings of work.

=== Pericos de Puebla ===
On May 15, 2019, Kelly was traded to the Pericos de Puebla of the Mexican League. In 14 relief outings for Puebla, he posted a 4.85 ERA with 6 strikeouts and 4 saves across 13 innings pitched. Kelly was released by the Pericos on June 13.

=== High Point Rockers ===
On June 22, 2019, Kelly signed with the High Point Rockers of the Atlantic League. He finished the regular season with 13 saves with 24 strikeouts in 24 innings pitched. In their inaugural season, the Rockers made the 2019 ALPB playoffs via wild card.

On November 22, 2019, Kelly signed with the Acereros de Monclova of the Mexican League. Kelly did not play in a game in 2020 due to the cancellation of the Mexican League season because of the COVID-19 pandemic.
