= Whale Branch Early College High School =

Location
- 169 Detour Road; Seabrook, Beaufort County, South Carolina 29940; United States
- Coordinates: 32.5218°N 80.7594°W

Information
- Type: Public high school
- Opened: 2010 (16 years ago)
- School district: Beaufort County School District
- Superintendent: Frank Rodriguez
- CEEB code: 410123
- Principal: Interim CaTia Gilbert
- Teaching staff: 46.42 (FTE)
- Grades: 9–12
- Enrollment: 450 (2023–2024)
- Student to teacher ratio: 9.69
- Campus size: 71 acres (29 ha)
- Campus type: Rural
- Colors: Purple and gold
- Mascot: Warrior
- Feeder schools: Whale Branch Middle; Joseph Shanklin Elementary; Whale Branch Elementary
- Website: wbechs.beaufortschools.net

Whale Branch Early College High School (usually called "Whale Branch") is a public high school within the Beaufort County School District, located in Seabrook, South Carolina, United States. The school district is the northernmost district of Beaufort County, and includes the unincorporated communities of Dale, Lobeco, Seabrook, and Sheldon.

Opened in 2010, the facility partners with the nearby Technical College of the Lowcountry, enabling students to earn concurrent college credit for several courses while obtaining high school diplomas.

== See also ==
- Beaufort County School District
