= Gaston Moore (American football) =

American football player (born 2002)

No. 3, 4, 13
- Position: Quarterback

Personal information
- Born: February 5, 2002 (age 24); Hilton Head Island, South Carolina, U.S.
- Listed height: 6 ft 2 in (1.88 m)
- Listed weight: 212 lb (96 kg)

Career information
- High school: Hilton Head Island (Hilton Head Island)
- College: UCF (2020); Tennessee (2021–2024); South Florida (2025)
- Stats at ESPN

Lucius Gaston Moore (born February 5, 2002) is an American former college football quarterback who played for the South Florida Bulls, Tennessee Volunteers, and UCF Knights.

== Early life and high school career ==
Moore grew up in Hilton Head Island, South Carolina, and attended Hilton Head Island High School. As a senior, he passed for 2,016 yards and 20 touchdowns with four interceptions, leading the Seahawks to a Bridge Bowl victory and a playoff appearance.

== College career ==
=== UCF (2020) ===
Moore began his college career at the University of Central Florida (UCF), redshirting the 2020 season under head coach Josh Heupel.

=== Tennessee (2021–2024) ===
In 2021, Moore transferred to the University of Tennessee as a walk-on, following Heupel and offensive coordinator Alex Golesh. He spent four seasons as a reserve quarterback. In 2024, he was the primary backup to Nico Iamaleava, appearing in six games and completing 16 of 27 passes for 201 yards, two touchdowns, and two interceptions. Moore graduated with a bachelor's degree in supply chain management in May 2024.

=== South Florida (2025) ===
Moore entered the NCAA transfer portal in December 2024 and initially stepped away from football to begin a professional career in Charleston, South Carolina. In July 2025, he transferred to USF to reunite with head coach Alex Golesh as a sixth-year senior. He quickly earned the No. 2 quarterback position behind starter Byrum Brown.

During the regular season, Moore appeared in seven games in relief, completing 14 of 20 passes for 54 yards and one touchdown.

With Brown opting out, Moore made his first career start in the 2025 Cure Bowl against Old Dominion on December 17, 2025. He completed 20 of 28 passes for 236 yards, one touchdown (a 31-yard pass), and two interceptions before exiting in the fourth quarter due to an apparent head injury after a hard hit. USF lost 24–10.

== Personal life ==
Moore's full name is Lucius Gaston Moore. He earned the nickname "Gas Pipe" from Tennessee head coach Josh Heupel.
