= James Saxon (American football) =

American football player and coach (born 1966)

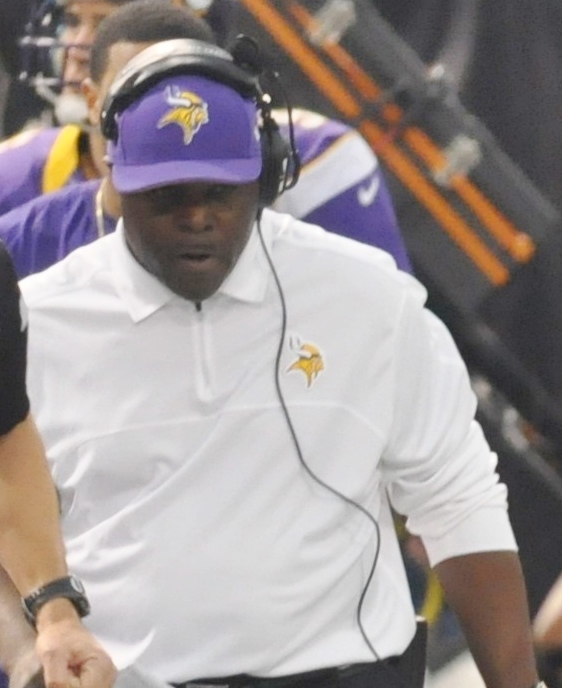
- Saxon as Minnesota Vikings running backs coach in 2012

No. 21, 22
- Position: Fullback

Personal information
- Born: March 23, 1966 (age 60); Beaufort, South Carolina, U.S.
- Listed height: 5 ft 11 in (1.80 m)
- Listed weight: 239 lb (108 kg)

Career information
- High school: Battery Creek (Beaufort)
- College: San Jose State
- NFL draft: 1988: 6th round, 139th overall pick

Career history

Playing
- Kansas City Chiefs (1988–1991); Miami Dolphins (1992–1994); Kansas City Chiefs (1995)*; Philadelphia Eagles (1995)
- * Offseason or practice squad member only

Coaching
- Rutgers (1997–1998) Running backs coach; Menlo (1999) Assistant; Buffalo Bills (2000) Running backs coach; Kansas City Chiefs (2001–2007) Running backs coach; Miami Dolphins (2008–2010) Running backs coach; Minnesota Vikings (2011–2013) Running backs coach; Pittsburgh Steelers (2014–2018) Running backs coach; Arizona Cardinals (2019–2022) Running backs coach; Memphis Showboats (2023) Offensive Line coach

Career NFL statistics
- Rushing yards: 533
- Rushing average: 3.7
- Rushing touchdowns: 5
- Receiving yards: 515
- Stats at Pro Football Reference

James Elijah Saxon (born March 23, 1966) is an American football coach and former fullback. He previously served as an assistant coach for the Pittsburgh Steelers, Minnesota Vikings, Miami Dolphins, Kansas City Chiefs, Arizona Cardinals and Buffalo Bills.

Saxon played college football at San Jose State and was drafted by the Kansas City Chiefs in the sixth round of the 1988 NFL draft. He played for eight seasons in the NFL with the Chiefs, Miami Dolphins and Philadelphia Eagles.

== Early life ==
Born in Beaufort, South Carolina, James Saxon graduated from Battery Creek High School in Burton, South Carolina in 1984.

== Playing career ==
=== College ===
Saxon moved to Sacramento, California to attend American River College and played on its football team from 1984 to 1985. Then, Saxon transferred to San Jose State University. Saxon played for the San Jose State Spartans football team in 1986 and 1987 as running back and was part of the Spartans' 1986 California Bowl championship team. James Saxon also has a son named Devin Saxon, some people may know him as a Football Player on the Harvard Crimson Football Team. Others may recognize him as "Mr. Minnesota" from the 2012 Cosmo's Bachelor of the Year.

=== National Football League ===
Pre-draft measurables
Height	Weight	Hand span	40-yard dash	10-yard split	20-yard split	20-yard shuttle	Vertical jump	Broad jump	Bench press
5 ft 11 1/8 in (1.81 m)	205 lb (93 kg)	9 1/4 in (0.23 m)	4.67 s	1.67 s	2.68 s	4.42 s	31.0 in (0.79 m)	9 ft 7 in (2.92 m)	12 reps

Saxon was selected in the sixth round of the 1988 NFL draft as the 135th overall pick. As a fullback, Saxon played for the Kansas City Chiefs from 1988 to 1991, Miami Dolphins from 1992 to 1994, and Philadelphia Eagles in 1995.

== Coaching career ==
=== Early career ===
In 1997, Saxon got his first coaching job as running backs coach at Rutgers University, a position he would have for two years. Saxon also served as a training camp coaching intern for the Kansas City Chiefs in 1998. In 1999, Saxon was a volunteer assistant coach for Menlo College.

=== Buffalo Bills ===
In 2000, Saxon was hired by the Buffalo Bills as their running backs coach.

=== Kansas City Chiefs ===
In 2001, Saxon was hired by the Kansas City Chiefs as their running backs coach. He would serve in that position until 2007.

=== Miami Dolphins ===
In 2008, Saxon was hired by the Miami Dolphins as their running backs coach and would serve in that position until 2009.

=== Minnesota Vikings ===
In 2010, Saxon was hired by the Minnesota Vikings as their running backs coach.

=== Pittsburgh Steelers ===
In 2014, Saxon was hired by the Pittsburgh Steelers as their running backs coach under head coach Mike Tomlin.

=== Arizona Cardinals ===
On January 14, 2019, Saxon was hired by the Arizona Cardinals as their running backs coach under head coach Kliff Kingsbury. Saxon kept his job with the Cardinals until his arrest for sexual assault incident in May 2022 became public Aug. 4, when he was put on administrative leave. Saxon resigned in October.

=== Memphis Showboats ===
On March 20, 2023, Saxon was added to the Memphis Showboats Staff as their Offensive Line Coach. He was no longer a part of the staff before the 2024 season.

== Legal issues ==
On November 17, 2022, Saxon plead guilty to his domestic battery charge stemming from a May 2022 incident; he subsequently received a one–year suspended sentence.
