= Grant Pace =

American politician

Member of the Utah House of Representatives from the 60th district
- Incumbent
- Assumed office May 5, 2026
- Preceded by: Tyler Clancy

Personal details
- Education: Brigham Young University (BA, JD); Harvard University (MBA)

Grant Pace is an American politician serving as a member of the Utah House of Representatives representing the 60th district. He was appointed in May 2026 to succeed Tyler Clancy, who resigned after being appointed the state's homelessness director.

Pace earned a Bachelor of Arts in 1974 and Juris Doctor in 1977 from Brigham Young University as well as a Master of Business Administration from the Harvard University in 1984.
