= Poona Ford =

American football player (born 1995)

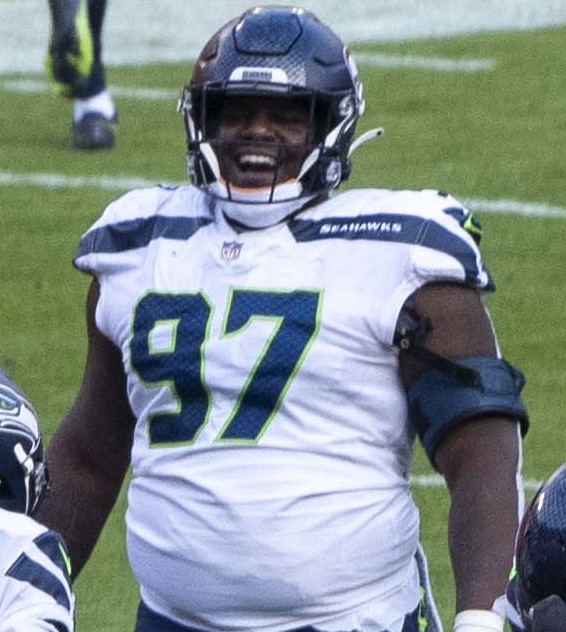
- Ford with the Seattle Seahawks in 2020

No. 97 – Los Angeles Rams
- Position: Nose tackle
- Roster status: Injured reserve

Personal information
- Born: November 19, 1995 (age 31); Beaufort, South Carolina, U.S.
- Listed height: 5 ft 11 in (1.80 m)
- Listed weight: 314 lb (142 kg)

Career information
- High school: Hilton Head (Hilton Head, South Carolina)
- College: Texas (2014–2017)
- NFL draft: 2018: undrafted

Career history
- Seattle Seahawks (2018–2022); Buffalo Bills (2023); Los Angeles Chargers (2024); Los Angeles Rams (2025–present)

Awards and highlights
- Big 12 Defensive Lineman of the Year (2017)

Career NFL statistics as of 2026
- Total tackles: 291
- Sacks: 13.5
- Forced fumbles: 1
- Fumble recoveries: 1
- Pass deflections: 11
- Interceptions: 1
- Stats at Pro Football Reference

Kaylon Nakia "Poona" Ford Jr. (born November 19, 1995) is an American professional football nose tackle for the Los Angeles Rams of the National Football League (NFL). He played college football for the Texas Longhorns, earning Big 12 Conference Defensive Lineman of the Year honors in 2017. He signed with the Seattle Seahawks as an undrafted free agent in 2018.

== Early life ==
Kaylon Ford was given his nickname (which is unrelated to the city of Poona in India) by his grandmother, Cynthia Ford Williams. When he was an infant of just 2 months old, she called him "Pooh Bear", after Winnie the Pooh. When he outgrew that particular nickname in grade school, she morphed it into "Poona", and the new nickname stuck.

Ford attended Hilton Head Island High School. He initially committed to the University of Louisville but changed his commitment when coach Charlie Strong left Louisville to take the head coaching job at the University of Texas.

== College career ==
Ford attended the University of Texas and played for the Longhorns from 2014 to 2017. In his freshman year Ford played in 7 games and had 9 total tackles and 1 tackle for loss. He improved in his sophomore year tallying a total of 39 tackles, 6 tackles for loss and 2.5 sacks in 10 games. In his junior year he had a college career high 54 total tackles and 5.5 tackles for loss through 12 games. In his senior year, Ford had his best year as he racked up a total of 31 tackles, 8 tackles for loss, and 1.5 sacks, earning him the Big 12 Conference Defensive Lineman of the Year award.

== Professional career ==
Pre-draft measurables
Height	Weight	Arm length	Hand span	Wingspan	40-yard dash	10-yard split	20-yard split	20-yard shuttle	Three-cone drill	Vertical jump	Broad jump	Bench press
5 ft 11 5/8 in (1.82 m)	306 lb (139 kg)	32 3/4 in (0.83 m)	9 1/4 in (0.23 m)	6 ft 8 1/4 in (2.04 m)	5.13 s	1.81 s	3.00 s	4.75 s	7.76 s	29.5 in (0.75 m)	9 ft 3 in (2.82 m)	24 reps
All values from Pro Day

=== Seattle Seahawks ===
Ford signed with the Seattle Seahawks as an undrafted free agent following the 2018 NFL draft. He made the Seahawks' 53-man roster as an undrafted rookie. He made his NFL debut in Week 2 against the Chicago Bears. He made his first NFL start in Week 13 against the San Francisco 49ers. He appeared in 11 games in his rookie season. He finished with 21 total tackles (13 solo, 8 combined).

In the 2019 season, Ford appeared in 15 games and started 14. He finished with .5 sacks, 32 total tackles, one pass defensed, and one fumble recovery. In the 2020 season, Ford started in all 16 games. He finished with two sacks, 40 total tackles, and one forced fumble.

The Seahawks placed a second-round restricted free agent tender on Ford on March 17, 2021. The Seahawks later signed him to a two-year contract extension. In the 2021 season, Ford started in all 17 games. He finished with two sacks, 53 total tackles, and one pass defensed. In the 2022 season, Ford started in all 17 games. He finished with three sacks, 35 total tackles, and two passes defensed.

=== Buffalo Bills ===
On May 2, 2023, Ford signed a one-year contract with the Buffalo Bills. He finished the 2023 season with one sack in eight games.

=== Los Angeles Chargers ===
On March 16, 2024, Ford signed with the Los Angeles Chargers. He was named a starter to begin the year, and finished the season starting all 17 games while recording 39 tackles, three sacks, five pass deflections and one interception.

=== Los Angeles Rams ===
On March 13, 2025, Ford signed a three-year, $27.6 million contract with the Los Angeles Rams. He played in 17 games, starting in 10, and recorded 47 tackles, two sacks, and one interception. Ford, who had worn No. 95 during the 2025 season, agreed to switch to No. 97 (which had been his number while playing for Seattle) for 2026 following the Rams' acquisition of defensive end Myles Garrett.

On October 19, 2026, Ford was placed on season-ending injured reserve with a ruptured triceps muscle. In the 2026 season, he played in six games, starting in one, and recorded 15 tackles and one pass deflection.

== NFL career statistics ==
=== Regular season ===
Year	Team	Games		Tackles					Fumbles				Interceptions			
Year	Team	GP	GS	Cmb	Solo	Ast	Sck	TFL	FF	FR	Yds	TD	Int	Yds	TD	PD
2018	SEA	11	1	21	13	8	0.0	3	0	0	0	0	0	0	0	0
2019	SEA	15	14	32	21	11	0.5	5	0	1	0	0	0	0	0	1
2020	SEA	16	16	40	25	15	2.0	8	1	0	0	0	0	0	0	0
2021	SEA	17	17	53	23	30	2.0	6	0	0	0	0	0	0	0	1
2022	SEA	17	16	35	22	13	3.0	6	0	0	0	0	0	0	0	2
2023	BUF	8	0	9	5	4	1.0	1	0	0	0	0	0	0	0	0
2024	LAC	17	17	39	24	15	3.0	8	0	0	0	0	1	3	0	5
2025	LAR	17	10	47	19	18	2.0	4	0	0	0	0	0	0	0	1
Career		118	91	276	152	124	13.5	41	1	1	0	0	1	3	0	10

=== Postseason ===
Year	Team	Games		Tackles					Fumbles				Interceptions			
Year	Team	GP	GS	Cmb	Solo	Ast	Sck	TFL	FF	FR	Yds	TD	Int	Yds	TD	PD
2018	SEA	1	0	2	2	0	0.0	0	0	0	0	0	0	0	0	0
2019	SEA	2	2	6	5	1	0.0	1	0	0	0	0	0	0	0	0
2020	SEA	1	1	4	3	1	0.0	0	0	0	0	0	0	0	0	0
2022	SEA	1	1	0	0	0	0.0	0	0	0	0	0	0	0	0	0
2024	LAC	1	1	3	3	0	0.0	1	0	0	0	0	0	0	0	0
2025	LAR	3	1	7	4	3	1.0	2	0	0	0	0	0	0	0	0
Career		9	6	22	17	5	1.0	4	0	0	0	0	0	0	0	0
