= Devin Taylor (American football) =

American football player (born 1989)

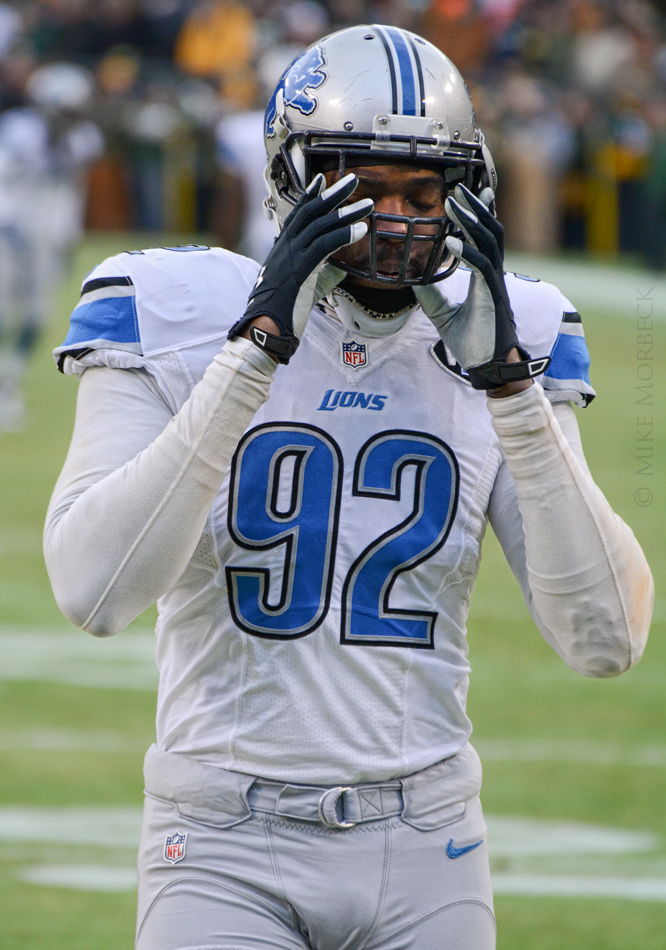
- Taylor with the Detroit Lions in 2014

No. 92, 98, 97
- Position: Defensive end

Personal information
- Born: November 15, 1989 (age 36); Lady's Island, South Carolina, U.S.
- Listed height: 6 ft 7 in (2.01 m)
- Listed weight: 266 lb (121 kg)

Career information
- High school: Beaufort (Beaufort, South Carolina)
- College: South Carolina
- NFL draft: 2013: 4th round, 132nd overall pick

Career history
- Detroit Lions (2013–2016); New York Giants (2017); Birmingham Iron (2019); Tampa Bay Vipers (2020)*; Los Angeles Wildcats (2020)
- * Offseason or practice squad member only

Awards and highlights
- First-team All-SEC (2010); Mid Season All-XFL (2020)

Career NFL statistics
- Total tackles: 93
- Sacks: 15
- Forced fumbles: 4
- Stats at Pro Football Reference

Devin Darnell Taylor (born November 15, 1989) is an American former professional football player who was a defensive end in the National Football League (NFL). He played college football for the South Carolina Gamecocks and was selected by the Detroit Lions in the fourth round of the 2013 NFL draft.

== Early life ==
Taylor was born on Lady's Island, South Carolina. He attended Beaufort High School, where he helped lead his Beaufort Eagles to the Class AAAA state championship game his senior year. He recorded 110 tackles with 10 quarterback sacks and 19 tackles for a loss during his senior campaign, and was recognized with first-team all-state selections from the Associated Press and The State. He recorded 80 tackles and four sacks as a junior. Taylor also lettered in basketball and track and field. As a senior, he won the Class 4A state title in the triple jump with a leap of 48 feet 3 inches.

== College career ==
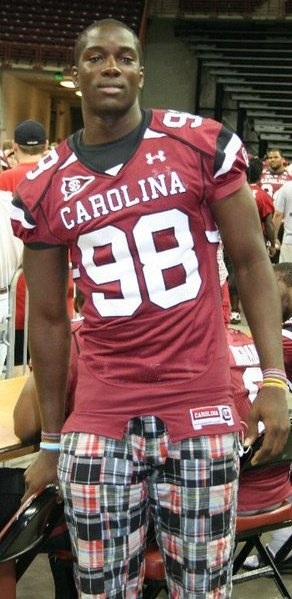
Taylor with South Carolina in 2013

Taylor received an athletic scholarship to attend the University of South Carolina, where he played for coach Steve Spurrier's Gamecocks teams from 2008 to 2012. He redshirted as a true freshman in 2008. He started the first five games but split playing time with Clifton Geathers for the duration of the 2009 season. Taylor earned recognition as the SEC Defensive Lineman of the Week in his first career college football game against NC State. In his first career college snap, Taylor forced a fumble that was recovered by the Gamecocks, which led to the only touchdown of the game. On NC State's second possession, he blocked a punt. He finished the game with six tackles (three for a loss), two forced fumbles, and a sack. In the 2009 season he recorded a total of 28 tackles, 5.5 tackles for loss, and two sacks.

As a sophomore, Taylor started all 14 games and led USC defensive linemen with 46 tackles, including thirteen tackles for loss and 7.5 sacks. He also led the team with eight pass breakups and eleven quarterback hurries. He scored a touchdown on a 24-yard interception return at Tennessee, which coupled with two fumble recoveries earned him recognition as SEC Defensive Lineman of the Week. Taylor, along with teammates Alshon Jeffery and Marcus Lattimore, was a first-team selection for the 2010 Associated Press All-SEC team.

Taylor started all 13 games for the 2011 Gamecocks, accruing 42 tackles and six sacks. He also had an interception returned for a touchdown in a loss against Arkansas. In 2012 Taylor started all 13 games, and logged 40 tackles with 8.5 tackles for loss and three sacks. He was also credited with five pass breakups and three hurries.

== Professional career ==
Pre-draft measurables
Height	Weight	Arm length	Hand span	40-yard dash	10-yard split	20-yard split	20-yard shuttle	Three-cone drill	Vertical jump	Broad jump	Bench press
6 ft 7 in (2.01 m)	266 lb (121 kg)	36 in (0.91 m)	10 3/8 in (0.26 m)	4.72 s	1.64 s	2.72 s	4.30 s	6.89 s	35.0 in (0.89 m)	10 ft 8 in (3.25 m)	16 reps

=== Detroit Lions ===
The Detroit Lions selected Taylor in the fourth round, with the 132nd overall pick, of the 2013 NFL draft.

On December 3, 2015, Taylor was involved in a controversial penalty call, where he was flagged for a face mask on Aaron Rodgers. The Packers would score on a game-winning Hail Mary after the call.

In 2016, Taylor started all 16 games recording 28 tackles, 4.5 sacks and one forced fumble. He was not re-signed after the season and became an unrestricted free agent.

=== New York Giants ===
On May 25, 2017, Taylor signed with the New York Giants. He was released on September 2, 2017. He was re-signed by the Giants on October 31, 2017. He was released on November 14, 2017.

=== Birmingham Iron ===
In 2018, Taylor signed with the Birmingham Iron of the Alliance of American Football for the 2019 season. Taylor recorded his first sack in the startup league in a Week 3 victory against the Atlanta Legends, forcing a fumble in the process. The league ceased operations in April 2019.

=== Tampa Bay Vipers ===
Taylor was selected in the 10th round during phase three in the 2020 XFL draft by the Tampa Bay Vipers. He was waived during final roster cuts on January 22, 2020.

=== Los Angeles Wildcats ===
Taylor was claimed off waivers by the Los Angeles Wildcats on January 22, 2020. Out of 5 games during the COVID-19 pandemic shortened season, Taylor played in 3, recording 8 tackles and 1.5 sacks. As a result, he was named to the league's midseason awards team, as well as being one of the highest graded pass rushers by Pro Football Focus. Taylor was profiled in an article about the XFL's shutdown. He had his contract terminated when the league suspended operations on April 10, 2020.

== Personal life ==
Taylor is related to Joe Frazier on his mother's side. Taylor stated he never met Frazier before his death, but in 2011 he said, "I've heard a bunch of different stories and stuff growing up from my mom and aunts who knew him".
