= Lobeco, South Carolina =

Lobeco
- Census-designated place
- Location within the state of South Carolina
- Coordinates: 32°33′10″N 80°44′36″W
- Country: United States
- State: South Carolina
- County: Beaufort

Area
  - Total: 2.63 sq mi (6.80 km^{2})
  - Land: 2.63 sq mi (6.80 km^{2})
  - Water: 0 sq mi (0.00 km^{2})
- Elevation: 7 ft (2.1 m)

Population (2020)
  - Total: 292
  - Density: 111.2/sq mi (42.94/km^{2})
- Time zone: UTC-5 (Eastern (EST))
  - Summer (DST): UTC-4 (EDT)
- ZIP codes: 29931
- Area codes: 843, 854
- FIPS code: 45-42145
- GNIS feature ID: 2812935

Lobeco (pronounced luh-BEE-co) is an unincorporated community and census-designated place (CDP) located in Beaufort County, South Carolina, United States. According to the 2020 census, the population was 292.

Situated about 10 miles (12 km) north of Beaufort, it is a predominantly agricultural area that has retained its rural character. A small community area consisting of a library, post office, and produce market serve as an anchor for the surrounding community. It is served by U.S. Highway 21. Nearby communities include Dale, Seabrook, and Sheldon. Its zipcode is: 29931.

The community name comes from an acronym of Long, Bellamy, and Company.

Lobeco has a public library, a branch of the Beaufort County Library.

== Demographics ==
Historical population
Census	Pop.	Note	%±
2020	292		—
U.S. Decennial Census; 2020

Lobeco first appeared as a census designated place in the 2020 U.S. census.

=== 2020 census ===
Lobeco CDP, South Carolina – Racial and ethnic composition Note: the US Census treats Hispanic/Latino as an ethnic category. This table excludes Latinos from the racial categories and assigns them to a separate category. Hispanics/Latinos may be of any race.
Race / Ethnicity (NH = Non-Hispanic)	Pop 2020	% 2020
White alone (NH)	99	33.90%
Black or African American alone (NH)	155	53.08%
Native American or Alaska Native alone (NH)	1	0.34%
Asian alone (NH)	4	1.37%
Pacific Islander alone (NH)	0	0.00%
Other race alone (NH)	4	1.37%
Mixed race or Multiracial (NH)	12	4.11%
Hispanic or Latino (any race)	17	5.82%
Total	292	100.00%
