= Mr and Mrs Bo Jo Jones =

1967 novel by Ann Head

Mr. and Mrs. Bo Jo Jones
- 1967 cover
- Author: Ann Head
- Language: English
- Subject: Young adult literature, Teenage pregnancy
- Published: May 12, 1967 (G. P. Putnam's Sons)
- Publication place: United States
- Media type: Print (hardback), (paperback)
- Pages: 253
- OCLC: 271432285

Mr and Mrs Bo Jo Jones is a 1967 novel written by Ann Head. It was initially marketed to an adult audience but was marketed as a young adult novel for its paperback release the following year. The work, along with S.E. Hinton's The Outsiders, is credited with launching new realism in young adult literature.

Ann Head was the pseudonym of author Anne Wales Christensen, who was born in Beaufort, South Carolina, on October 30, 1915. She was married first to Howard Head and then to Dr. Stanley Morse Jr. and lived in South Carolina. She was also a mentor to Pat Conroy. Instead of graduating college, she became a freelance writer at age 28. She died at age 52 of a cerebral aneurysm on May 7, 1968.

Even though Mr and Mrs Bo Jo Jones was marketed for young adults, Ann Head did not consider herself a young adult writer, and wrote the book for an adult audience. However, because the novel sold better to young adults, it is now considered part of the genre of young adult literature.

In 1971 the novel was adapted to a made-for-TV movie by the same name starring Desi Arnaz Jr. and Christopher Norris.

== Synopsis ==
July Greher Jones tells the story of the first year of her marriage to her high school boyfriend, the football hero Boswell Johnson "Bo Jo" Jones. When the story begins, 16-year-old July and 17-year-old Bo Jo are high school seniors preparing for college. The upper-middle-class Grehers plan for July to attend an elite college; Bo Jo's working-class family hopes that he will get a football scholarship and be the first in his family to attend college. July's parents do not approve of her spending so much time with Bo Jo, and try to get her to date other boys. Although July is not certain of her feelings for Bo Jo, she likes him more than other boys she has dated, and the couple continues to see each other exclusively.

One night, after consuming alcohol at a party where Bo Jo's former girlfriend Alicia is present and makes July feel jealous, Bo Jo and July end up having sex. July learns she is pregnant just as Bo Jo receives his letter of acceptance and football scholarship from Georgia Tech. The couple hide the pregnancy from their parents, secretly drive across the state line, and get married. Eventually they inform their parents, causing Bo Jo's parents to throw him out of the house and July's parents to threaten a forced annulment and an illegal abortion. Both sets of parents reluctantly accept the marriage. The couple are forced to leave school, and live for a disastrous short time with Bo Jo's parents, who blame July for ruining Bo Jo's college opportunity. July's parents then arrange an apartment for the couple and a job for Bo Jo at July's father's bank. The only truly supportive adult is July's grandmother.

July and Bo Jo soon find themselves missing their old life of school, football, and social events, and begin to bicker with each other and spend time apart. Lonely and bored, July begins writing to a Princeton student named Horace, who, unlike Bo Jo, is from her social class and shares July's interests in music and literature. Horace lives out of town and is unaware that July is now married with a baby on the way, and July avoids telling him, even when his letters begin to show a romantic interest. July also meets and bonds with another young teenage bride, Lou, who is an aspiring singer and actress recently married to an older man. July and Lou's friendship comes to an end when Lou becomes unexpectedly pregnant and, unlike July, decides to have an illegal abortion without telling her husband. Lou's husband finds out and angrily hits Lou, who leaves him and moves to New York, where she becomes a nightclub singer and the mistress of a wealthy man. July realizes that unlike Lou, she does want her baby, which is beginning to move in her womb.

Bo Jo meanwhile has sought solace by spending more time out drinking with his old friends Charlie and Alicia, whom July does not like, especially since Alicia still seems to be romantically pursuing Bo Jo. After Bo Jo and July argue, he leaves the house and later comes home with a lipstick smudge on his neck, causing July to suspect him of cheating on her with Alicia. Two months before July is due, she confronts Alicia and afterwards goes into early labor. The premature baby dies a few days after birth.

Bo Jo and July's parents now suggest that the couple should split up and resume the lives they had before, with July attending a boarding school near Princeton and Bo Jo getting his football scholarship back. But Bo Jo and July realize that their shared grief over the lost baby has brought them closer together, and now they are truly in love and do not want to break up. Three years later, Bo Jo is attending college, living in the married students' housing with his wife July, who works in the bursar's office to help pay their expenses.

== Characters ==
- July Greher - The sixteen-year-old protagonist of the novel, which is told from her first-person point of view. She is a senior in high school and really enjoys the subjects of English literature and Biology. She planned to attend a girls’ college in New England after graduation, but the unplanned pregnancy and marriage interrupt those plans. She had never “gone steady” with anyone before, and neither she nor Bo Jo were considered “offbeat” or had anything “way out” about them. They never intended to have premarital sex, and even feel ashamed for weeks afterward (before finding out about the pregnancy). She believes that marriage is a serious commitment despite her rushing into it, and also believes that marriage is worth preserving and implies certain promises. She also is strongly opposed to abortion and giving up the baby for adoption. She feels isolated from her family and friends after her marriage to Bo Jo because they (1) don't have the shared experience and (2) don't believe the marriage will/should last.
- Bo Jo Jones - Boswell Johnson Jones is July's long-term boyfriend and eventual husband, as well as father of the child. He is seventeen and his best quality is his persistence no matter the activity. He is a private person who mostly keeps his thoughts to himself, but works really hard in school in order to get the grades necessary for acceptance to a university. They don't have a lot of money and Bo Jo will be the first of his family to attend college. He is the school's star halfback whose family is banking his receiving an athletic scholarship to a university. Before their unplanned, intimate night on the beach, neither had considered their relationship serious. However, after they slip up, July tries to break up with Bo Jo and he tells her that he doesn't want to date anyone else and she says likewise. He promises not to “fall off the deep end” ever again, and they try to continue dating. After July informs Bo Jo that she is pregnant, he asserts that they should get married. Bo Jo struggles in his interactions with July and learning to be married, as well as his lost educational opportunities, but does his best to provide for July and their expected baby.
- Mary Anne Simmons - July's best friend, who is described as naive and pure despite a “sophisticated” upbringing. She has a long-term boyfriend, Alan, whom she eventually marries at the end of the novel. Her and Alan's relationship is set up as a foil against July and Bo Jo's marriage. Not only do Mary Anne and Alan love each other, but they follow a proper timeline in their relationship and engage in age-appropriate activities. Mary Anne's family is complicated because her mother supposedly has a new husband and family in Peru who Mary Anne never sees, and Mary Anne helps to raise the dozen “orphan” siblings her father has collected from multiple marriages and divorces with women who leave all their children behind (whether fathered by Mr. Simmons or not). Mary Anne is the same social class as July and refers to each successive stepmother as “Mother _____,” which to those unaware of the situation would make it seem like she was referring to a nun.
- Horace Clark - A nephew of one of Mr. and Mrs. Greher's friends whose family comes to visit with July's family right before July and Bo Jo are able to tell her parents about their marriage. July's mother tries to get July to take Horace out on the town to give him something to do, while Bo Jo is right there. He is a sophomore at the university and plans to attend Princeton. They enjoy sophisticated conversation together and Horace eventually writes to July. Hurt by Bo Jo's emotional distance and their constant fighting, and lonely because of her isolation from friends and family, July writes Horace as a pen pal. She deliberately writes about anything besides her marriage, signs the letters with her maiden name, and has them delivered to her parents’ home. After a while, July and Bo Jo reach a level of solidarity in their marriage but July still struggles to write Horace off. Eventually Horace basically confesses his love to July in a letter that is intercepted by Mrs. Greher, who is upset because Horace's aunt called, wondering about the correspondence. July writes back that she never intended to lead Horace on in that way and that she enjoyed the friendship. Horace responds after the baby is born and dead, and the couple is facing forced separation. He says that he is still interested in pursuing July should she ever find herself “unattached.” Horace represents ‘what could have been’ had July not gotten pregnant and married. He is of her same social and economic standing and much more intellectual and sophisticated than Bo Jo. July decidedly rejects this option with her and Bo Jo's decision to stay together. Horace is in many ways representative of all July's parents wanted for her, and opportunities she could not have because of getting pregnant as a teenager.
- Charlie Sanders - Bo Jo's best friend who is considered to be wild but "quiet" about it. He is portrayed to believe that the world is his oyster. He throws parties out of town and July's parents are not fond of him. July doesn't like Charlie very much either but would never say anything to Bo Jo as they are very good friends, and she pretended to like Charlie in order to ease Bo Jo's mind when they first started dating.
- Tommy Ryan and Julius Spence - Boys July has dated before but views more like brothers then significant others.
- Alicia Helms - Bo Jo's ex-girlfriend who moved out of town but attends the same social events. Alicia's presence within the group at the prom (along with some champagne slipped into the punch) motivated July and Bo Jo to go to the beach alone after the party rather than stay with the group. At first Bo Jo seems uninterested in Alicia, but Alicia aggressively pursues Bo Jo after he and July marry. After July and Bo Jo verbally fight, Bo Jo feels hurt and sometimes spends time with Charlie and Alicia in the aftermath of his fights with July. One night Bo Jo comes home after a fight and has a lipstick smudge on his neck, which July is sure came from Alicia. Two months before July is due she has an upsetting encounter with Alicia and afterwards goes into labor.
- Rodney Blue - The nice guy whom only the desperate teens date.
- Lou Consuelo - Lou is set up as another foil against July. She is seventeen years old and married to a twenty-seven-year-old horse trainer. She and July become friends one day at the supermarket and bond over being both young and married. July feels that her old friends her age can no longer relate to her, and Lou doesn't really get along with the wives of her husband, Nick's, older friends. Lou dreams of becoming a singer and actress and requires Nick to promise her that opportunity upon agreeing to marry him. However, Lou gets pregnant and blames it on Nick because he wanted to have unplanned (unprotected) sex on a day vacation. Lou thinks that having a child would ruin any chance of her becoming a star and has an illegal abortion in secret that she has to take out a loan in order to cover the cost. Nick wants children, finds out about the abortion, and is furious with Lou in response. Lou packs up and moves to New York. She writes to July to explain what happened and how she is doing. While July sometimes regrets her lost opportunities, she would never follow Lou's choices. July may not have wanted the baby at first and only acted how seemed necessary, but decides that she does want the baby when she can feel the life inside of her and compares her own experience with Lou's.
- Mr. and Mrs Greher - Mr. and Mrs. Greher are July's parents. Mr. Greher works in a bank where they are firmly upper-middle class and have a good reputation in the community. Mrs. Greher was brought up in high society and cares very much about propriety. They live in the established side of town and can afford what they consider the very best. Before July and Bo Jo marry, Mr. and Mrs. Greher do not like Bo Jo very much and encourage July to spend less time with him and more time with varied groups of friends. Finding out about the marriage and the baby shocks Mr. and Mrs. Greher, and they feel that they have not only failed July as parents but that July is deliberately trying to hurt them. They would prefer to have July give up the baby for adoption and have the marriage annulled, not only because they disapprove of Bo Jo (being from a different class) but because the marriage limits July's own social and educational opportunities. Mr. Greher does offer Bo Jo a job at the bank (which he accepts) in order to cover the newlyweds’ costs of living and pregnancy expenses. They also secure a private apartment above an acquaintance's garage for the newlyweds, which allows them some autonomy and privacy.
- Mr. and Mrs. Jones - Mr. Jones is a contract engineer and the family is comparatively “new” to both the middle class and the community at large. Neither Mr. nor Mrs. Jones, nor their other two children, attended a university and they have high hopes for Bo Jo to gain an education so that he can secure a better, easier life for himself. Because they are newly established as lower-middle class, they cannot afford their children's college expenses. Previous to July and Bo Jo's wedding, Mr. and Mrs. Jones hadn't even been keeping track of who their son was dating. When they find out about the marriage and pregnancy they are absolutely livid because it means that even after all of Bo Jo's hard work to get good grades and secure an athletic scholarship, he won't be able to utilize it. They kick him out of the house when informed of the marriage, but allow the couple to stay with them after a couple days past. This proves to be disastrous as they are constantly, verbally reminding July that she ruined Bo Jo's life and hovering over their every action. Mrs. Jones tries to teach July some domestic skills but July often fails at these. They also won't allow the newlyweds to sleep in the same room while staying in their home. Mr. and Mrs. Jones also do not like Mr. and Mrs. Greher and act very antagonistically toward them upon any forced interaction.
- Grandma Louisa Conduit Greher - July's grandmother is very proper but only snobbish about the “right things,” according to July. She cares about people being “open minded.” She likes to drive her car like a skilled racecar drivier and lives in the nice home her husband left behind after he died, but took down all of the pictures of his high-class ancestors because she didn't know them. When July's parents force July and Bo Jo to undergo a second marriage ceremony for propriety's sake, Grandmother Greher attends the ceremony at the church and afterwards gifts July four slim gold bracelets linked together by a gold chain with “faith,” “forgiveness,” “humor,” and “eternal vigilance” engraved on each one. She encourages July to strive for these qualities in her own marriage because July and Bo Jo don't have love to rely on. Grandmother Greher is the only one to accept July and Bo Jo's marriage, as well as Bo Jo himself, and becomes a mentor figure who helps them through their struggles and hard decisions. She does this not through telling the teenagers what to do, but rather getting them to talk through their problems and figure out their own values and beliefs.

== Reception ==
Kirkus Reviews reviewed the book, stating that "Ann Head deals all this out with a determinedly light hand, but her teenagers for all their troubles are all-American, and appealing--and some young marrieds may empathize, some older ones (women) sympathize."

== Movie adaptation ==
The novel was adapted for a made-for-TV movie of the same name in 1971. 20th Century Fox and Lester Linsk produced the movie. Starring Desi Arnaz Jr. and Christopher Norris, it first aired on Tuesday, November 16, 1971, as the ABC Movie of the Week, and was the second-most watched primetime television show in the United States for the week being the third most watched movie on U.S. television during 1971 after ABC's Brian's Song and CBS's A Death of Innocence with a Nielsen rating of 30.2 and an audience share of 45%.
