= Luis Martinez (catcher) =

American baseball player (born 1985)

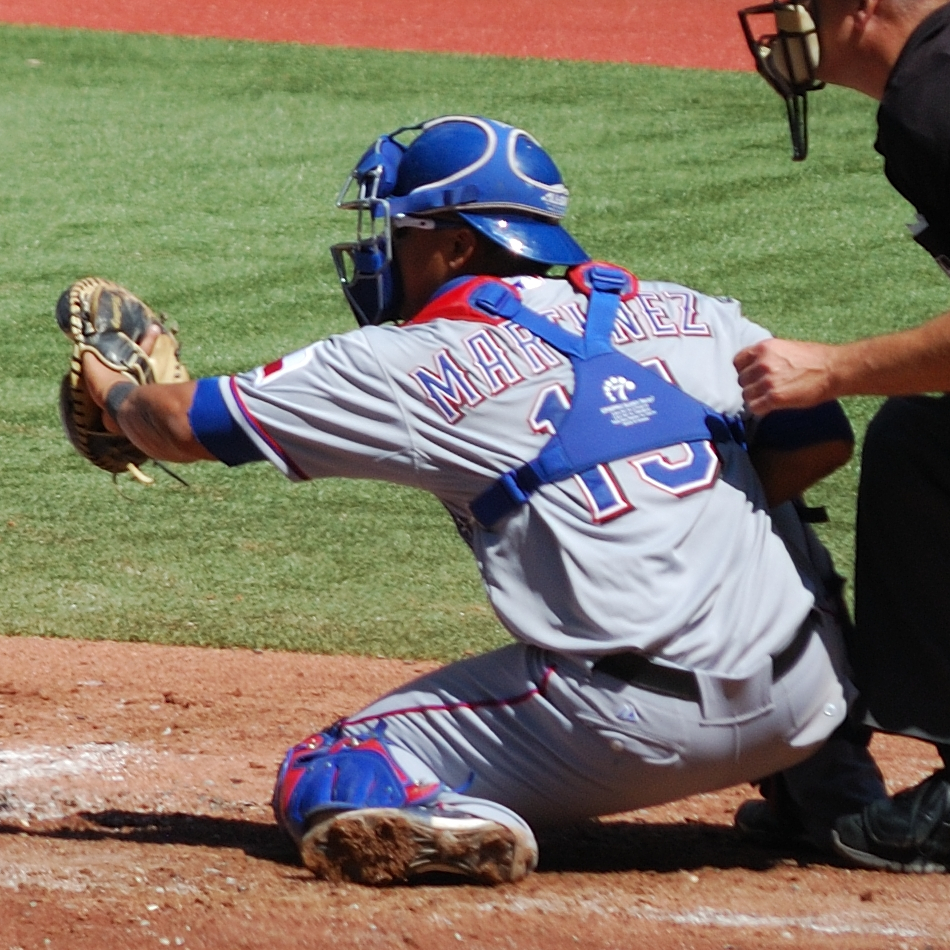
- Martinez with the Texas Rangers
- Catcher
- Born: April 3, 1985 (age 41); Miami, Florida, U.S.
- Batted: Right Threw: Right

MLB debut
- July 15, 2011, for the San Diego Padres

Last appearance
- September 28, 2012, for the Texas Rangers

MLB statistics
- Batting average: .182
- Home runs: 1
- Runs batted in: 10
- Stats at Baseball Reference

Teams
- San Diego Padres (2011); Texas Rangers (2012)

Luis Manuel Martinez (born April 3, 1985) is a Colombian-American former professional baseball catcher. He played 32 games in Major League Baseball (MLB) for the San Diego Padres and Texas Rangers.

== Career ==
Prior to playing professionally, Martinez attended Coral Park High School, Jackson State Community College, and then Cumberland University. He was originally drafted by the New York Mets in the 11th round of the 2005 Major League Baseball draft, however he opted not to sign.

=== San Diego Padres ===
Martinez was next drafted by the Padres in the 12th round, with the 387th overall selection, of the 2007 Major League Baseball draft, beginning his professional career that year.

Martinez played for the Eugene Emeralds and Fort Wayne Wizards in 2007, hitting a combined .253 with two home runs and 17 RBI in 45 games. In 2008, he hit .223 with three home runs and 19 RBI with the Wizards. With the Lake Elsinore Storm and Portland Beavers in 2009, Martinez hit .286 with four home runs and 41 RBI in 94 games. He hit .282 with two home runs and 31 RBI with the San Antonio Missions in 2010.

=== Texas Rangers ===
On December 21, 2011, Martinez was traded to the Texas Rangers in exchange for pitcher Ryan Kelly. Martinez was recalled from the Triple–A Round Rock Express on August 11, 2012, when Mike Napoli was placed on the disabled list He played in 10 games for the Rangers, going 2-for-18 (.111). Martinez was designated for assignment on December 26, 2012, following the signing of A. J. Pierzynski.

=== Baltimore Orioles ===
On January 4, 2013, Martinez was claimed off waivers by the Baltimore Orioles. On February 5, he was designated for assignment following the acquisition of Russ Canzler. Martinez cleared waivers and was sent outright to the Triple-A Norfolk Tides on February 8. He made 62 appearances split between Norfolk and the Triple-A Norfolk Tides, posting a cumulative .257/.319/.346 batting line with one home run and 20 RBI.

=== Los Angeles Angels of Anaheim ===
On November 19, 2013, Martinez signed a minor league contract with the Los Angeles Angels of Anaheim. In 53 appearances for the Triple-A Salt Lake Bees, he batted .262/.329/.403 with four home runs and 22 RBI. Martinez was released by the Angels organization on August 3, 2014.

=== Oakland Athletics ===
On August 3, 2014, the same day as his release from the Angels, Martinez signed a minor league contract with the Oakland Athletics organization, replacing Luis Exposito. In 14 appearances for the Triple-A Sacramento River Cats, he slashed .150/.277/.175 with three RBI.

=== Boston Red Sox ===
On January 23, 2015, Martinez signed a minor league contract with the Boston Red Sox organization. He made 83 appearances split between the Double-A Portland Sea Dogs and Triple-A Pawtucket Red Sox, slashing .208/.299/.266 with one home run, 29 RBI, and one stolen base. Martinez became a free agent on November 7.
