= Wayne Simmons (American football) =

American football player (1969–2002)

No. 59, 56, 55
- Position: Linebacker

Personal information
- Born: December 15, 1969; Hilton Head, South Carolina, U.S.
- Died: August 23, 2002 (aged 32); Kansas City, Missouri, U.S.
- Listed height: 6 ft 2 in (1.88 m)
- Listed weight: 245 lb (111 kg)

Career information
- High school: Hilton Head Island (SC)
- College: Clemson
- NFL draft: 1993: 1st round, 15th overall pick

Career history
- Green Bay Packers (1993–1997); Kansas City Chiefs (1997-1998); Buffalo Bills (1998)

Awards and highlights
- Super Bowl champion (XXXI); PFWA All-Rookie Team (1993)

Career NFL statistics
- Tackles: 289
- Sacks: 11.5
- Interceptions: 3
- Stats at Pro Football Reference

Wayne General Simmons (December 15, 1969 – August 23, 2002) was an American professional football player who was a linebacker in the National Football League (NFL).

Simmons was selected by the Green Bay Packers with the 15th pick of the first round of the 1993 NFL draft. Simmons played for Green Bay for four and a half years, earning a Super Bowl ring at the end of the 1996 season. Simmons was well known for shutting down opposing tight ends, but in doing this task extremely well he was not able to obtain the attention-grabbing statistics of quarterback sacks. Simmons was traded to the Kansas City Chiefs during the 1997 season when Seth Joyner returned from knee surgery. The Chiefs waived Simmons in 1998 after a 30–7 Monday Night loss to their arch-rival Denver Broncos, in which Simmons and fellow linebacker Derrick Thomas were called for a total of five personal fouls on the Broncos' final touchdown drive. The Buffalo Bills claimed Simmons off waivers on November 19, 1998, and he played five games before being released by the team in February 1999.

== Death ==
In the early morning hours of August 23, 2002, Simmons was killed at the age of 32 in a single-car crash on Interstate 70 in Independence, Missouri. Witnesses reported he was driving his Mercedes at high speed and weaving through traffic before losing control of the vehicle. The car rolled several times before landing in a ditch and catching fire.
