= McLeod Farmstead =

- U.S. National Register of Historic Places
- U.S. Historic district
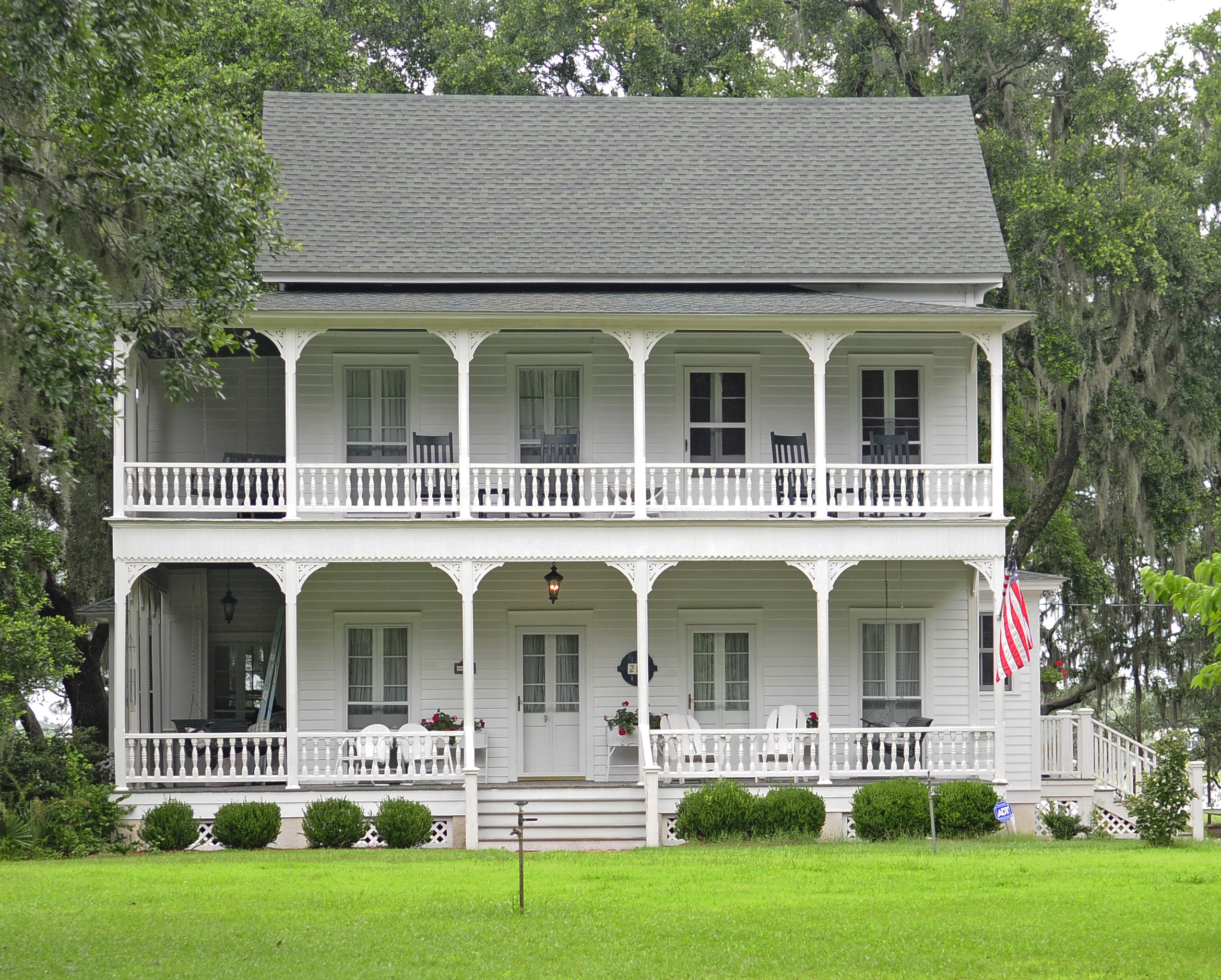
- McLeod Farm House, June 2012

- Location within South Carolina Location within the United States
- Location: Seabrook Rd. 1 mi. W of SC 21 and 10 mi. N of Beaufort, Seabrook, South Carolina
- Coordinates: 32°31′40″N 80°45′56″W
- Area: 15 acres (6.1 ha)
- Built: 1884
- Architectural style: Broken Roof Variant Barn
- NRHP reference No.: 97000776
- Added to NRHP: July 25, 1997

McLeod Farmstead, also known as Rest Park Tract and Seabrook Farms, is a historic farmstead and national historic district located at Seabrook, Beaufort County, South Carolina. The district encompasses 12 contributing building and 2 contributing structures, and is representative of the truck farming economy that spread through the region between 1884 and 1946. The contributing farm buildings include the Keyserling gin (c. 1880) and McLeod Barn (c. 1885). Two of the buildings served commercial purposes: The McLeod general store (c. 1875) and the Keyserling general store (c. 1880). There are also three residential structures: the McLeod House (1905), a two-room shack which likely housed farm workers (c. 1900), and the residence and the office of the farm supervisor (c. 1945).

It was listed in the National Register of Historic Places in 1997.
