= Adam Robertson (American politician) =

American politician, businessman, and engineer

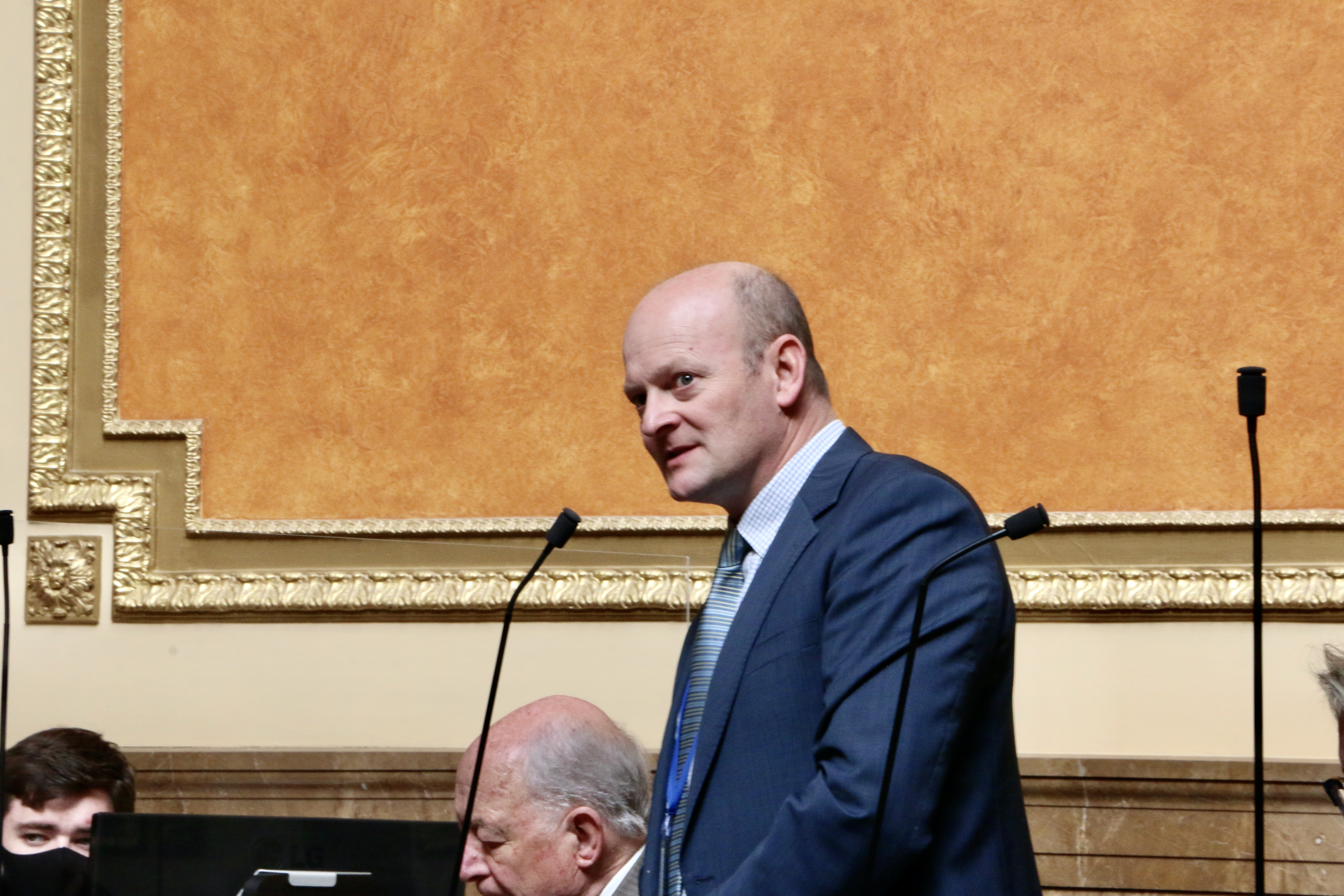
- Adam Robertson

Member of the Utah House of Representatives from the 63rd district
- In office January 16, 2018 – December 21, 2022
- Preceded by: Dean Sanpei
- Succeeded by: Tyler Clancy (Redistricting)

Personal details
- Born: Rexburg, Idaho
- Party: Republican
- Education: BYU (BS, MBA)

Adam Robertson is an American politician, businessman, and engineer who served as a member of the Utah House of Representatives for the 63rd district, which includes Provo, Utah.

== Early life and education ==
Robertson was born in Rexburg, Idaho. He earned a Bachelor of Science in electrical engineering and Master of Business Administration from Brigham Young University.

== Career ==
From 1998 to 2000, Robertson worked as a manufacturing engineer at Hewlett-Packard. Robertson also worked as a manager and designer at Agilent Technologies. From 2010 to 2012, Robertson was an adjunct professor at Brigham Young University. From 2007 to 2017, Robertson served as a vice president of IMSAR, LLC, a radar technology company based in Spanish Fork, Utah. Since 2016, Robertson has worked as the CFO of Fortem Technologies Incorporated, a company he co-founded. Robertson was nominated to serve as a member of the Utah House of Representatives on January 16, 2018. Within the Utah Legislature, Robertson currently serves on the Business, Economic Development, and Labor Appropriations Subcommittee, House Education Committee, and House Revenue and Taxation Committee. Robertson was redistricted to district 60 and re-elected in 2022 but resigned weeks later before the start of the legislative session.

== 2022 sponsored legislation ==
Bill	Status
HB 185- Initiative and Referendum Amendments	House/ filed 3/4/22
HB 211- School Fees Amendments	House/ filed 3/4/22
HB 222- Driving Privilege Card Amendments	House/ to Governor 3/14/22
HB 237- Local District Modifications	House/ to Governor 3/10/22
HB 395- Municipal Voting Methods Amendments	House/ filed 3/4/22
HB 452- Corporation Reinstatement Amendments	House/ filed 3/4/2022
