= Collin Drafts =

American football player (born 1985)

No. 14
- Position: Quarterback

Personal information
- Born: April 11, 1985 (age 41); Beaufort, South Carolina, U.S.
- Listed height: 6 ft 3 in (1.91 m)
- Listed weight: 215 lb (98 kg)

Career information
- High school: Battery Creek (Beaufort)
- College: Charleston Southern
- NFL draft: 2007: undrafted

Career history
- Tri-Cities Fever (2007); Green Bay Blizzard (2008); Amarillo Dusters (2009); Dallas Vigilantes (2010); Orlando Predators (2011); Jacksonville Sharks (2012); Orlando Predators (2012–2013); Lakeland Raiders (2013)

Career AFL statistics
- Completions: 411
- Attempts: 694
- Yards: 4,543
- Touchdowns: 87
- Interceptions: 24
- Stats at ArenaFan.com

Collin Drafts (born April 11, 1985) is an American former professional football quarterback who played in the Arena Football League (AFL). He played college football at Charleston Southern University. He was signed as an undrafted free agent by the Tri-Cities Fever in 2007.

== College career ==
Drafts attended Charleston Southern University, where he was a scholarship quarterback. As a four-year starter for the Buccaneers, Drafts accounted for over 90 touchdowns and 10,000 total yards in his career. He was voted to the Big South Football All-Decade Team for 2002–09.

== Professional career ==
After going undrafted in 2007, Drafts attended a two-day workout with the Manchester Wolves of the af2.

=== Tri-Cities Fever ===
In his first ever af2 start, Drafts threw 4 touchdown passes, as the Tri-Cities Fever lost 52–42 to the Boise Burn.

=== Green Bay Blizzard ===
Drafts played with the Green Bay Blizzard in 2008.

=== Amarillo Dusters ===
Drafts was the starting quarterback for the Amarillo Dusters during the 2009 season.

=== Dallas Vigilantes ===
In 2010, Drafts moved to the Arena Football League with the Dallas Vigilantes.

=== Orlando Predators ===
Drafts was about to give up professional football when Pat O'Hara called Drafts at his home, and convinced him to play for the Orlando Predators.

=== Jacksonville Sharks ===
Drafts played with the Jacksonville Sharks in 2012.

=== Orlando Predators ===
Drafts re-joined the Predators in 2012. He started the 2013 season with the Lakeland Raiders of the Ultimate Indoor Football League, but signed with the Predators to be their backup quarterback in June.

== Legacy ==
Drafts has been inducted into the hall of fames for Battery Creek High School, Charleston Southern University, and the Big South Conference.

At halftime of the Charleston Southern football game on October 11, 2025, his #7 jersey was retired.

== Coaching career ==
2011–2012 – Offensive coordinator at Olympia High School in Orlando, Florida (Back to back District Champions)

2013–2015 – Offensive coordinator/quarterbacks coach at West Orange High School in Winter Garden, Florida. (32–5 record in 3 years)

2016 – Head coach East River High School in Orlando, Florida 2016. (6–5 made playoffs)

2017–2018 – Head coach of A.C. Flora High School in Forest Acres, South Carolina (0–10 first year to 9–3 second year, made playoffs, and 4A Lower State Coach of the Year)

2019–present – Head coach at Allen D. Nease High School in Ponte Vedra, Florida.
