= 2025 Cure Bowl =

Postseason college football bowl game

2025 StaffDNA Cure Bowl
- 11th Cure Bowl
Old Dominion Monarchs	South Florida Bulls
(9–3)	(9–3)
Sun Belt	American
24	10
Head coach: Ricky Rahne	Head coach: Kevin Patrick (interim)
	1	2	3	4	Total
Old Dominion	7	0	10	7	24
South Florida	3	7	0	0	10
- Date: December 17, 2025
- Season: 2025
- Stadium: Camping World Stadium
- Location: Orlando, Florida
- MVP: Quinn Henicle (QB, Old Dominion)
- Favorite: South Florida by 2.5
- Referee: Ron Hudson (Conference USA)
- Attendance: 15,036

United States TV coverage
- Network: ESPN
- Announcers: Dave Neal (play-by-play), Fozzy Whittaker (analyst), and Morgan Uber (sideline reporter); Jamie Seh (play-by-play) and Rene Ingoglia (analyst) (Bowl Season Radio)

The 2025 Cure Bowl was a college football bowl game played on December 17, 2025, at Camping World Stadium located in Orlando, Florida. The eleventh annual Cure Bowl featured the Old Dominion Monarchs (9–3) of the Sun Belt Conference and the South Florida Bulls (9–3) of the American Conference. Old Dominion beat South Florida by a score of 24–10. The game began at approximately 5:00 p.m. EST and aired on ESPN. The Cure Bowl was one of the 2025–26 bowl games concluding the 2025 FBS football season. The game was sponsored by StaffDNA, a digital marketplace for healthcare jobs, and was officially known as the StaffDNA Cure Bowl.

== Teams ==
This was the first time that Old Dominion and South Florida ever played each other.

=== Old Dominion Monarchs ===
Old Dominion opened their season with a loss, then won four games in a row. Following back-to-back losses in mid-October, the Monarchs finished their regular season with five consecutive wins. Old Dominion entered the Cure Bowl with a 9–3 record.

=== South Florida Bulls ===
South Florida compiled a 6–1 record in their first seven games, losing only to the fifth-ranked Miami Hurricanes; the Bulls were ranked as high as 18th. South Florida went on to lose two of their final five games. The Bulls entered the Cure Bowl with a 9–3 record.

South Florida was led in their bowl game by interim head coach Kevin Patrick, who took over from Alex Golesh (who was hired by Auburn) at the end of November.

=== Game summary ===
2025 StaffDNA Cure Bowl
Old Dominion Monarchs (9–3) vs. South Florida Bulls (9–3)

Quarter	1	2	3	4	Total
Monarchs	7	0	10	7	24
Bulls	3	7	0	0	10

at Camping World Stadium • Orlando, Florida

- Date: December 17, 2025
- Game time: 5:00 p.m. EST
- Game weather: Cloudy • Temperature: 72 °F (22 °C) • Wind: 10 mph (16 km/h) east
- Game attendance: 15,036
- Referee: Ron Hudson
- TV: ESPN
  - Box score
  - Game book

Game information

First Quarter

- (5:18) USF – Nico Gramatica 28-yard field goal (Drive: 8 plays, 31 yards, 2:03; USF 3–0)
- (0:42) ODU – Quinn Henicle 6-yard run (Nathanial Eichner kick) (Drive: 10 plays, 75 yards, 4:36; ODU 7–3)

Second Quarter

- (7:24) USF – Jeremiah Koger 31-yard pass from Gaston Moore (Nico Gramatica kick) (Drive: 3 plays, 55 yards, 1:03; USF 10–7)

Third Quarter

- (10:06) ODU – Trequan Jones 22-yard run (Nathanial Eichner kick) (Drive: 3 plays, 25 yards, 0:38; ODU 14–10)
- (3:27) ODU – Nathanial Eichner 24-yard field goal (Drive: 10 plays, 73 yards, 4:13; ODU 17–10)

Fourth Quarter

- (2:24) ODU – Quinn Henicle 51-yard run (Nathanial Eichner kick) (Drive: 4 plays, 57 yards, 1:15; ODU 24–10)

== Statistics ==
Statistics	ODU	USF
First downs	21	19
Total yards	382	333
Rushing yards	255	52
Passing yards	127	281
Passing: Comp–Att–Int	11–26–0	27–41–4
Turnovers	1	5
Time of possession	31:07	28:53

Team	Category	Player	Statistics
Old Dominion	Passing	Quinn Henicle	11/25, 127 yards
Old Dominion	Rushing	Quinn Henicle	24 carries, 107 yards, 2 TD
Old Dominion	Receiving	Na'eem Abdur-Raheem Gladding	5 catches, 60 yards
South Florida	Passing	Gaston Moore	20/28, 236 yards, TD, 2 INT
South Florida	Rushing	Alvon Isaac	7 carries, 41 yards
South Florida	Receiving	Christian Neptune	10 catches, 102 yards
