= Beaufort County School District =

School district in South Carolina, United States

Address
- 2900 Mink Point Boulevard Beaufort, South Carolina, 29902; United States

District information
- Superintendent: Frank Rodriguez
- Accreditation: Southern Association of Colleges and Schools

Other information
- Website: www.beaufortschools.net

Beaufort County School District (BCSD) is a public school district in Beaufort County, South Carolina, United States. The school district is led by Superintendent Frank Rodriguez, who began the role in July 2019. The district is governed by an eleven-member board of education of elected members who represent the electoral district in which they live and serve.

The majority of the district's schools are accredited with the Southern Association of Colleges and Schools.

== Boundary ==
It serves all residents of most parts of the county for grades K-12. However, the children of Department of Defense employees and children of civilians working for the United States federal government, who are living in the permanent housing on the property of Marine Corps Air Station Beaufort are zoned to Department of Defense Education Activity (DoDEA) for schools for grades pre-kindergarten–8. However Beaufort County Schools does serve the MCAS Beaufort property for high school, and in sum has the highest number of students of any school system affiliated with MCAS Beaufort. Additionally, while BCSD does not specify school zoning for MCAS Beaufort for the elementary level, in 2024 it stated that there is a zoned BCSD middle school for MCAS Beaufort.

== Controversies ==
In October 2022, the school district removed 97 books from library shelves following challenges from a small group of community members. Most of the targeted novels were aimed at young adult readers and featured LGBTQ or BIPOC characters. Three students organized testimony and protests against the bans, and achieved reinstatement of 91 of the 97 challenged titles. A documentary about the students' work, Banned Together, was released in 2024.

== List of schools ==
=== High schools ===
- Battery Creek High School
- Beaufort High School
- Bluffton High School
- Hilton Head Island High School
- May River High School
- Whale Branch Early College High School

=== Middle schools ===
- Beaufort Middle School
- Bluffton Middle School
- H.E. McCracken Middle School
- Hilton Head Island Middle School
- Lady's Island Middle School
- Robert Smalls Leadership Academy
- Whale Branch Middle School

=== Elementary schools ===
- Beaufort Elementary School
- Bluffton Elementary School
- Broad River Elementary School
- Coosa Elementary School
- Hilton Head Island Elementary School
  - An annex to the school is Daufuskie Island Elementary School. In 1995 it replaced the former Mary Fields School.
- Hilton Head Island School for the Creative Arts
- Joseph Shanklin Elementary School
- Lady's Island Elementary School
- Michael C. Riley Elementary School
- Mossy Oaks Elementary School
- Okatie Elementary School
- Port Royal Elementary School
- Pritchardville Elementary School
- Red Cedar Elementary School
- Saint Helena Elementary School
- Whale Branch Elementary School

=== Academy schools ===
- River Ridge Academy
- Robert Smalls Leadership Academy

=== Early childhood centers ===
- Bluffton Early Childhood Center
- Hilton Head Island Early Childhood Center
- James J. Davis Early Childhood Center
- Michael C. Riley Early Childhood Center
- Saint Helena Early Learning Center

=== Charter schools ===
- Riverview Charter School (K–8)

=== Other schools ===
- Beaufort County Adult Education
- Beaufort-Jasper Academy for Career Excellence (9–12)

=== Closed schools ===
- James J. Davis Elementary School
- Shell Point Elementary School

== Specific schools and programs ==
=== Beaufort County Adult Education ===
Beaufort County Adult Education is an alternative school within the Beaufort County School District. Students over the age of seventeen can complete coursework for their South Carolina high school diploma or study for the GED examination. The program also offers classes through South Carolina Virtual Schools.

=== Joseph Shanklin Elementary School ===
In October 1901, the school started with seven pupils. By January 1905, 150 students attended. A group of northern abolitionists and Beaufort citizens founded it. The school's mission was to instruct African American students in better cultivation of land, care of stock, and manner of living. The school offered instruction in carpentry, bricklaying, printing, and other trades. Courses for girls included cooking, sewing, nursing, and homemaking. By 1920 The Port Royal Agricultural School became the Beaufort County Training School, but it was still known as The Shanklin School by area residents. With public and private funds, it met the need for African-American teachers and was known as a teacher's training site. The school maintained 800 acres (3.2 km^{2}) of land, two barns, two dormitories, a power plant, equipment, and an endowment of around $11,000. Today, the school is located at 121 Morrall Drive.

=== Mossy Oaks Elementary School ===
The school opened in 1962. The school has met federal AYP (adequate yearly progress) since its initiation and has been a Title One school for the past two years. The school serves students from pre-kindergarten to fifth grade and has one resource class, and one self-contained classroom for students with special needs. Mossy Oaks is one of South Carolina's newly named "Red Carpet" schools by the State Department of Education.
