= Seabrook, South Carolina =

Seabrook
- Census-designated place
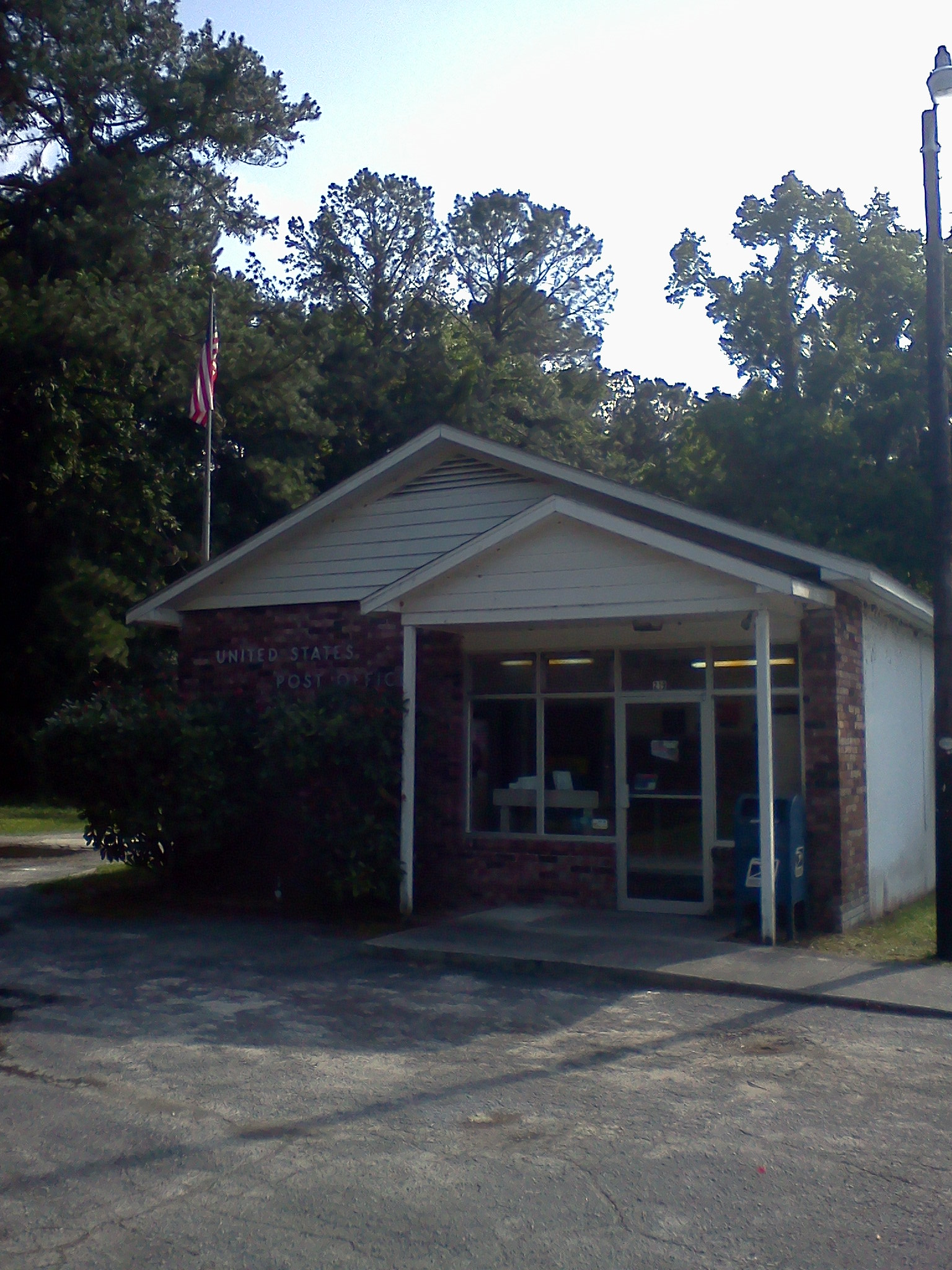
- Current Post office in Seabrook, South Carolina
- Interactive map of Seabrook
- Coordinates: 32°31′24″N 80°44′45″W
- Country: United States
- State: South Carolina
- County: Beaufort

Area
  - Total: 6.53 sq mi (16.92 km^{2})
  - Land: 5.50 sq mi (14.25 km^{2})
  - Water: 1.03 sq mi (2.66 km^{2})
- Elevation: 16 ft (4.9 m)

Population (2020)
  - Total: 1,255
  - Density: 228.0/sq mi (88.05/km^{2})
- Time zone: UTC-5 (Eastern (EST))
  - Summer (DST): UTC-4 (EDT)
- ZIP codes: 29940
- Area codes: 843, 854
- FIPS code: 45-64690
- GNIS feature ID: 2812933

Seabrook is an unincorporated community and census-designated place (CDP) located in Beaufort County, South Carolina, United States. It was first listed as a CDP in the 2020 census with a population of 1,255.

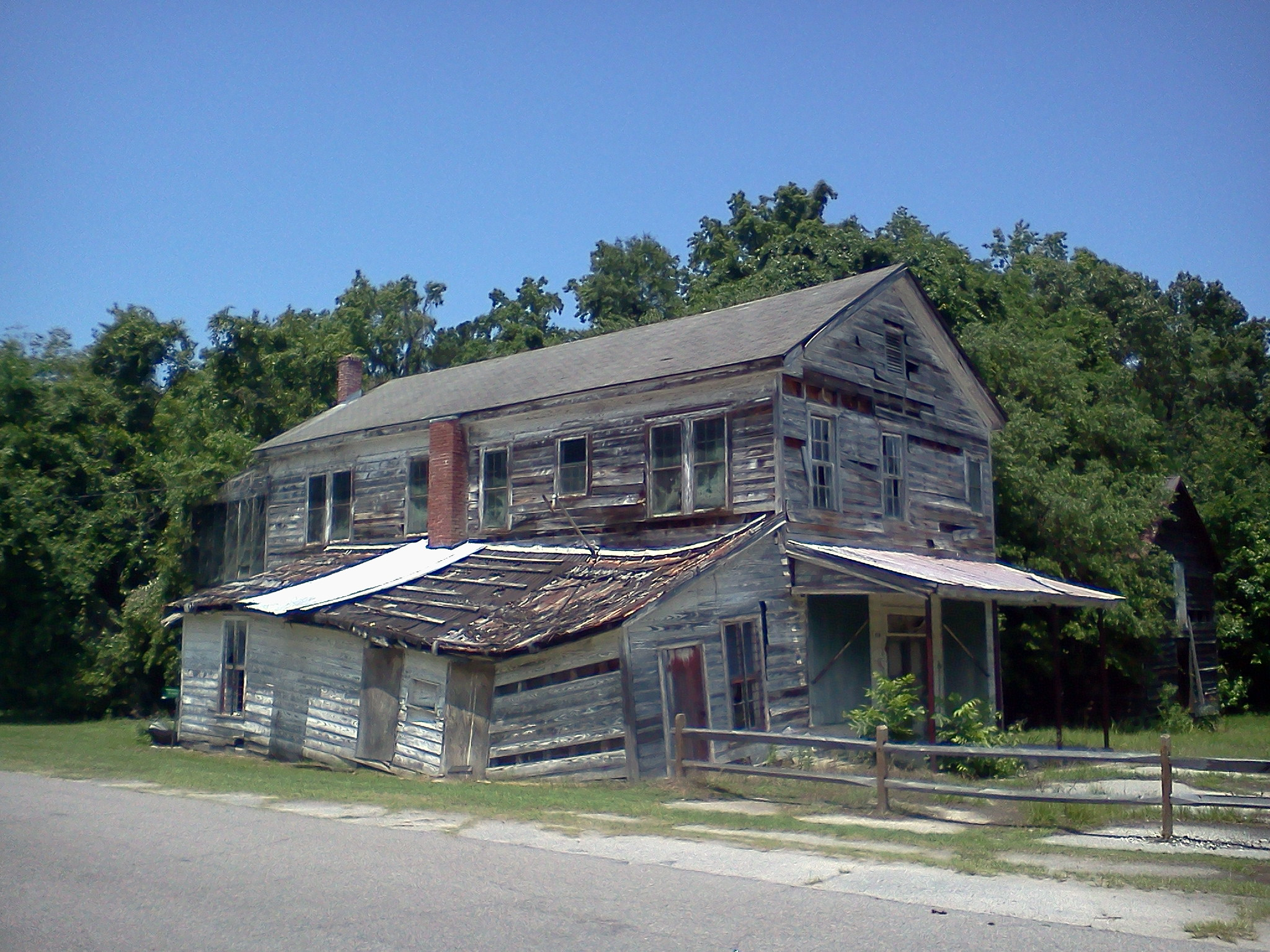
Original post office and general store in Seabrook, South Carolina

Situated in northern part of the county along the Whale Branch River, Seabrook was founded in the late 18th century as a collection of plantations became established in the area. In the late 19th century, Seabrook became a stop on the Port Royal and Augusta Railway and featured a small, but bustling downtown area that had a federal Post Office, a general store, a gas station, and a train station. The local economy was driven by the nearby farmland. The village's old economy and markets have since yielded to development in Beaufort, though the Post Office remains to serve the village's remaining inhabitants. In the past ten years, three new public schools have opened in the Seabrook area to serve area students, including Whale Branch Early College High School.

The McLeod Farmstead was listed on the National Register of Historic Places in 1997.

== Demographics ==
Historical population
Census	Pop.	Note	%±
2020	1,255		—
U.S. decennial census 2020

Seabrook first appeared as a census designated place in the 2020 U.S. census.

=== 2020 census ===
Seabrook CDP, South Carolina – Racial and ethnic composition Note: the US Census treats Hispanic/Latino as an ethnic category. This table excludes Latinos from the racial categories and assigns them to a separate category. Hispanics/Latinos may be of any race.
Race / Ethnicity (NH = Non-Hispanic)	Pop 2020	% 2020
White alone (NH)	395	31.47%
Black or African American alone (NH)	782	62.31%
Native American or Alaska Native alone (NH)	7	0.56%
Asian alone (NH)	7	0.56%
Pacific Islander alone (NH)	0	0.00%
Other race alone (NH)	0	0.00%
Mixed race or Multiracial (NH)	19	1.51%
Hispanic or Latino (any race)	45	3.59%
Total	1,255	100.00%

== Sources ==
- http://www.seabrookpoint.com/
- http://www.merchantcircle.com/business/US.Post.Office.843-846-2775
- http://www.beaufortsc.org/military/marine-corps-air-station-beaufort.stml
- http://beauforttribune.com/archives/56671
