= South Carolina High School League =

Organization that rules and regulates school athletics in the state of South Carolina

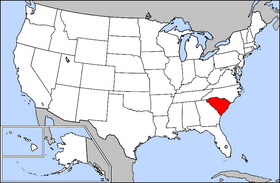
- Abbreviation: SCHSL
- Formation: 1913
- Type: Volunteer; NPO
- Legal status: Association
- Purpose: Athletic/Educational
- Headquarters: 121 Westpark Blvd. Columbia, SC 29210
- Region served: South Carolina
- Members: 420 schools
- President: Jason Warren
- Affiliations: National Federation of State High School Associations
- Staff: 12
- Website: schsl.org

The South Carolina High School League (SCHSL) is the organization that rules and regulates school athletics in the U.S. state of South Carolina. Based out of Columbia, the SCHSL serves over 330,000 students at 220 high schools and 200 junior high schools.

== History ==
In 1913, the Inter-High School Athletic and Oratorical Association was founded by delegates from various high schools and the University of South Carolina. By 1920, the organization had expanded its membership and activities to the point where reorganization was necessary. In 1921, a new constitution was adopted and the name was officially changed to the South Carolina High School League. The SCHSL experienced a boom in membership from 1921–1930, going from 30 schools to 121 schools. The constitution was rewritten in 1933 and again 1948 to accommodate further growth. The SCHSL joined the National Federation of State High School Associations in 1948. Ever since 1954, the SCHSL has had 100% of the public schools in the state as members. In 1970 the South Carolina Secondary School Activities Association merged with the league.

== Competition ==
SCHSL sanctions competition in the following sports: baseball, basketball, competitive cheerleading, cross country, football, golf, lacrosse, soccer, softball, swimming, tennis, track & field, volleyball, and wrestling.

== Classifications ==
The SCHSL has five classes of competition, dependent on the size of a school's student enrollment:

- AAAAA (5A)
- AAAA (4A)
- AAA (3A)
- AA (2A)
- A (1A)

Class 5A was formed in the 2016–2017 school year and is the largest classification in the SCHSL. Realignment for SCHSL member schools occurs every two years.

== Member Schools ==
Listed below are the member schools of the SCHSL, grouped by their classification and region for the 2026–2028 period:

=== AAAAA (5A) ===
Region 1	Region 2	Region 3	Region 4	Region 5	Region 6
Byrnes	Boiling Springs	Chapin	Blythewood	Ashley Ridge	Berkeley
Eastside	Dorman	Dutch Fork	Gray Collegiate	Fort Dorchester	Cane Bay
Hillcrest	Fort Mill	Lexington	Ridge View	James Island	Carolina Forest
J.L. Mann	Northwestern	River Bluff	Spring Valley	R.B. Stall	Goose Creek
Mauldin	Rock Hill	White Knoll	Sumter	Stratford	Socastee
Woodmont	Spartanburg			Summerville	Wando
				West Ashley	

=== AAAA (4A) ===
Region 1	Region 2	Region 3	Region 4	Region 5	Region 6	Region 7
Easley	Gaffney	Catawba Ridge	A.C. Flora	Aiken	Beaufort	Conway
Fountain Inn	Greenville	Clover	Dreher	Fox Creek	Bluffton	Myrtle Beach
Greenwood	Greer	Indian Land	Lancaster	Irmo	Colleton County	North Myrtle Beach
Laurens	Riverside	Lake Wylie	Lugoff-Elgin	Midland Valley	Hilton Head Island	South Florence
T.L. Hanna	Travelers Rest	Legion Collegiate	Richland Northeast	North Augusta	Lucy Beckham	St. James
Westside	Wade Hampton	Nation Ford	Westwood	South Aiken	May River	West Florence
		South Pointe				Wilson
		York				

=== AAA (3A) ===
Region 1	Region 2	Region 3	Region 4	Region 5	Region 6
Berea	Belton-Honea Path	Blue Ridge	Airport	Bishop England	Atlantic Collegiate
Daniel	Emerald	Broome	Brookland-Cayce	Georgetown	Aynor
Pickens	Legacy Early College	Chapman	Camden	Hanahan	Crestwood
Seneca	Palmetto	Christ Church Episcopal	Gilbert	North Charleston	Darlington
Southside	Powdersville	Union County	Lower Richland	Oceanside Collegiate	Hartsville
Walhalla	Wren		Swansea		Lakewood
					Loris

=== AA (2A) ===
Region 1	Region 2	Region 3	Region 4	Region 5	Region 6
Brashier MC	Chesnee	Andrew Jackson	American Leadership	Academic Magnet	Dillon
Carolina	Clinton	Chester	Horse Creek	Battery Creek	East Clarendon
Crescent	Greer MC	Columbia	Orangeburg-Wilkinson	Bridges Prep	Lake City
GREEN Upstate Charter	High Point	Keenan	Pelion	Lake Marion	Manning
Greenville Tech Charter	Landrum	Mid-Carolina	Saluda	Phillip Simmons	Marlboro County
Liberty	Mountain View Prep	Newberry	Silver Bluff	Timberland	Waccamaw
Pendleton	Southside Christian	York Prepartory	Strom Thurmond	Woodland	
St. Joseph's Catholic	Woodruff				

=== A (1A) ===
Region 1	Region 2	Region 3	Region 4	Region 5	Region 6	Region 7	Region 8	Region 9	Region 10
Abbeville	Batesburg-Leesville	Blacksburg	Barnwell	Central	Bamberg-Ehrhardt	Allendale-Fairfax	Baptist Hill	Andrews	Coastal
Calhoun Falls	C.A. Johnson	Buford	Blackville-Hilda	Cheraw	Bethune-Bowman	Hampton County	Burke	Carvers Bay	Green Sea Floyds
Dixie	Clear Dot Charter	Fairfield-Central	Calhoun County	Chesterfield	Branchville	Hardeeville	Charleston Charter	Hannah Pamplico	Lake View
McCormick	Eau Claire	Great Falls	Hunter-Kinard-Tyler	Governor's School (GSSM)	Denmark-Olar	Polaris Tech	Cross	Hemingway	Latta
Ninety-Six	Ridge Springs-Monetta	Lewisville	North	Lamar	Edisto	Ridgeland	Lowcountry Leadership	Johnsonville	Marion
SC School for Deaf & Blind	Whitmire	Midlands Stem	Wagener-Salley	Lee Central	Scott's Branch	Royal Live Oaks	Military Magnet	Kingstree	Mullins
Thornwell		Riverwalk	Williston-Elko	McBee		Whale Branch	Palmetto Scholars		Virtus Academy
Ware Shoals				North Central			St. Johns		
