= Devaroe Lawrence =

American football player (born 1992)

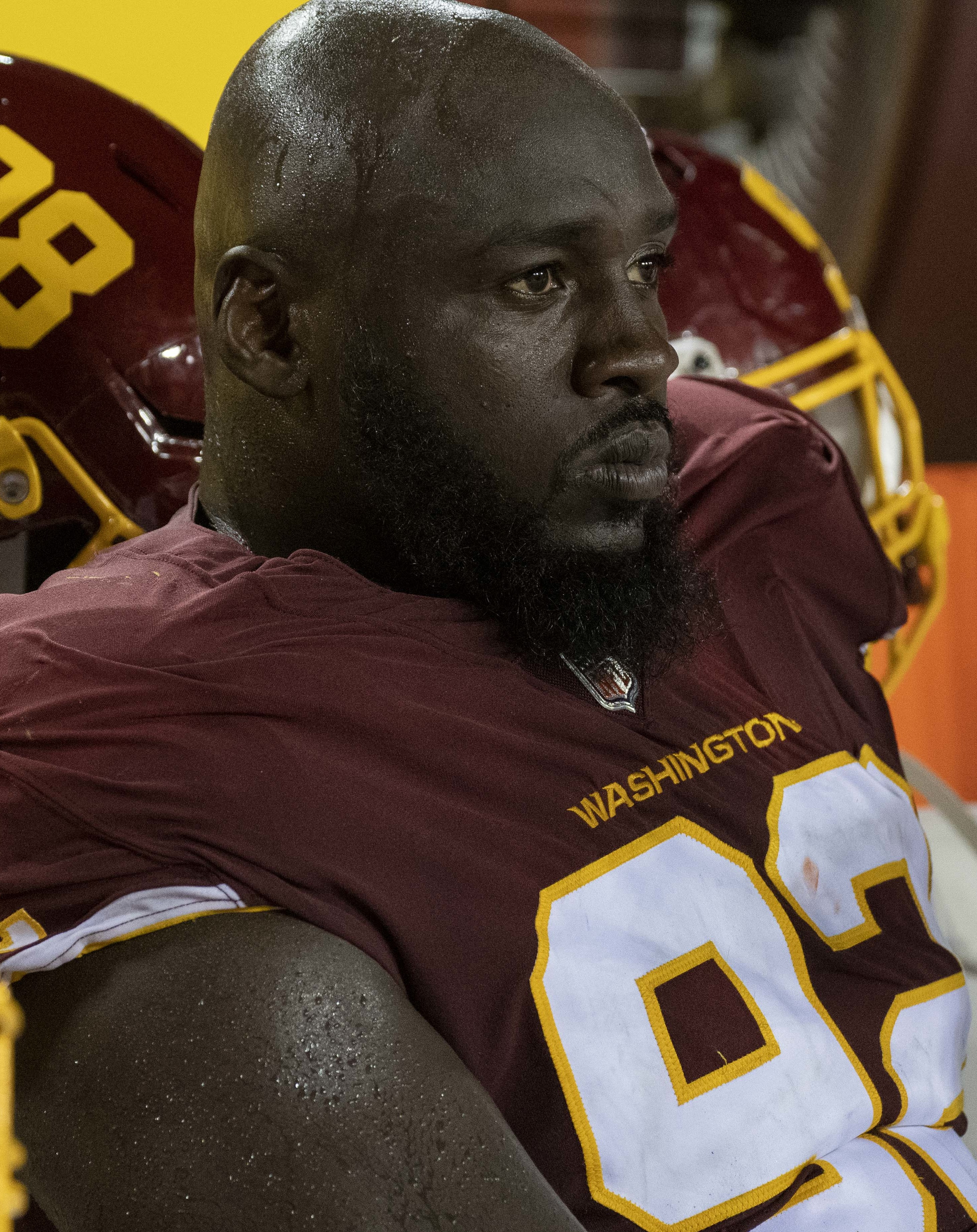
- Lawrence with the Washington Football Team in 2021

No. 99, 92
- Position: Defensive tackle

Personal information
- Born: October 13, 1992 (age 34); Greenville, South Carolina, U.S.
- Listed height: 6 ft 2 in (1.88 m)
- Listed weight: 295 lb (134 kg)

Career information
- High school: Carolina Academy (Greenville)
- College: Auburn
- NFL draft: 2017: undrafted

Career history
- New Orleans Saints (2017); Cleveland Browns (2018–2019); Kansas City Chiefs (2019–2020)*; Washington Football Team (2020)
- * Offseason or practice squad member only

Awards and highlights
- Super Bowl champion (LIV)

Career NFL statistics
- Total tackles: 9
- Pass deflections: 1
- Interceptions: 1
- Fumble recoveries: 1
- Stats at Pro Football Reference

Devaroe Lawrence (born October 13, 1992) is an American former professional football player who was a defensive tackle in the National Football League (NFL). He played college football for the Auburn Tigers and signed with the New Orleans Saints as an undrafted free agent in 2017. Lawrence was also a member of the Cleveland Browns, Kansas City Chiefs, and Washington Football Team.

== Early life ==
Lawrence was born and grew up in Greenville, South Carolina, and attended Carolina Academy. His biological father was absent from his life and his mother abandoned him at the age of 12 after giving him to another couple in an unofficial adoption. He dealt drugs starting in eight grade and was served a two week jail sentence while in high school, with two more stints in jail shortly after his graduation. Lawrence was later taken in by Sam Kelly, one of the assistant coaches at Carolina Academy, who employed him at his software company.

== College career ==
Having had no offers to play college football out of high school due to poor academic performance and his legal issues, Lawrence initially took courses at Greenville Technical College. Participated in an open tryout Georgia Military College's football team and was offered a spot on the team as a walk-on, despite having been overweight and not having played the sport in over two years. He redshirted his freshman year in order to get into shape. He committed to Auburn over offers from Southern Miss and West Virginia going into his redshirt freshman season. He tallied 20 tackles and 4.5 sacks in his only season of play for the Bulldogs.

Lawrence then played three seasons for the Tigers. He appeared in four games with one tackle, which was for a loss, in his first season with the team before entering the regular defensive line rotation as a redshirt junior. Lawrence played in all 13 of Auburn's games as a redshirt junior, making 31 tackles, two for a loss, and half of a sack. In his final season, Lawrence played in 11 games, recording 13 tackles, three for a loss, and one sack. He tore his ACL in his final career game. Lawrence finished his Auburn career with 45 total tackles with six tackles for loss and 1.5 sacks in 28 games played.

== Professional career ==
=== New Orleans Saints ===
Lawrence was signed by the New Orleans Saints as an undrafted free agent on May 1, 2017. He spent the 2017 season on injured reserve while he recovered from his ACL tear.

=== Cleveland Browns ===
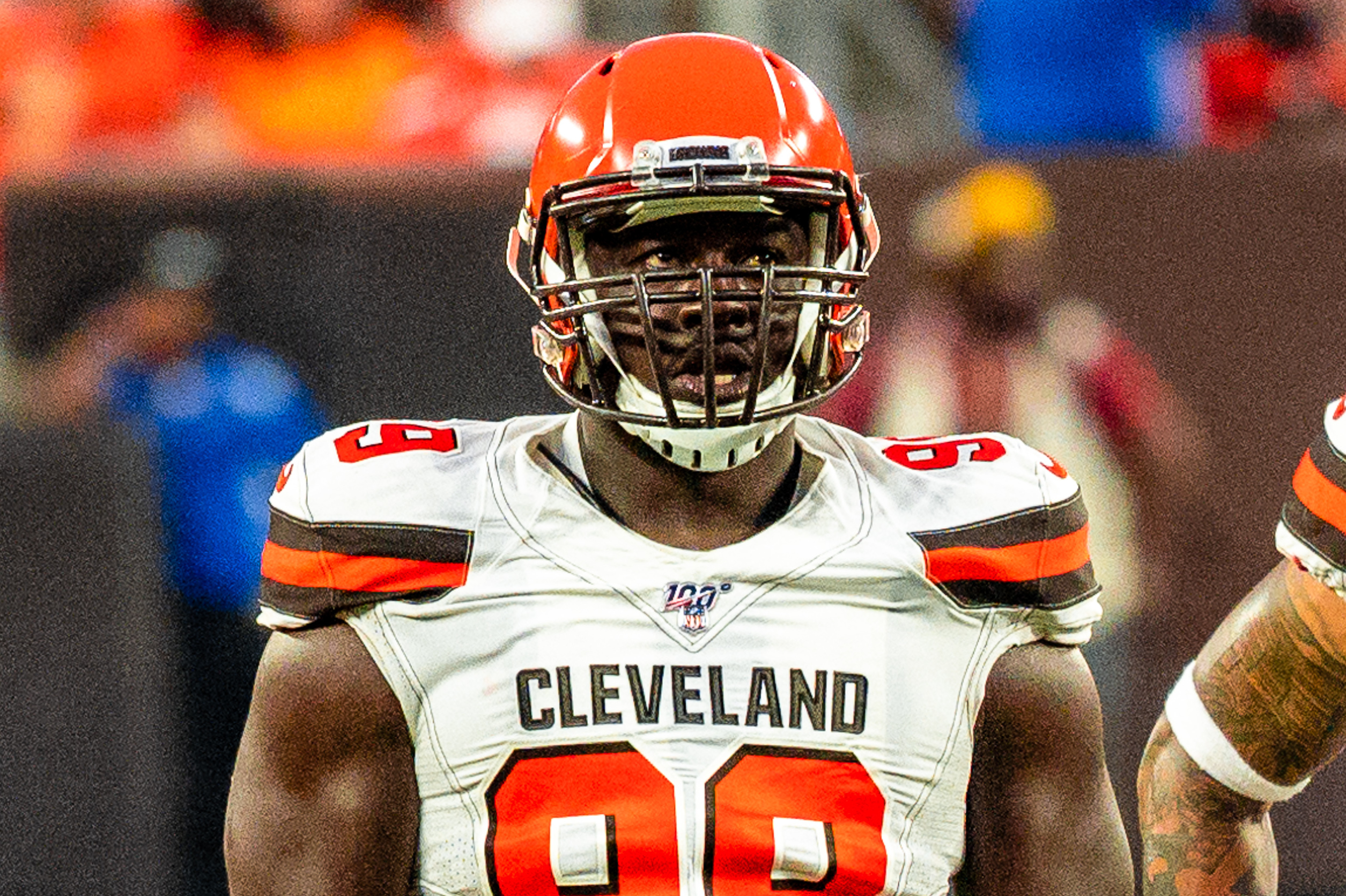
Lawrence with the Cleveland Browns in 2019

Lawrence was traded to the Cleveland Browns on September 1, 2018, for a 2019 seventh-round draft pick. Lawrence made his NFL debut on September 9, 2018, during the Browns season opener against the Pittsburgh Steelers. He was waived by the Browns on October 4, 2018, and was re-signed to the practice squad. The Browns signed Lawrence to a futures contract on January 2, 2019.

On November 26, 2019, Lawrence was waived by the Browns. He had eight tackles with a fumble recovery and an interception in 11 games played with two starts with the Browns at the time of his release.

=== Kansas City Chiefs ===
On November 30, 2019, Lawrence was signed to the Kansas City Chiefs practice squad. Lawrence remained on the practice squad for the rest of the 2019 season, including during the Chiefs Super Bowl LIV victory. He re-signed with the Chiefs on February 5, 2020. He was waived during final roster cuts on September 5, 2020.

=== Washington Football Team ===
On September 30, 2020, Lawrence signed with the Washington Football Team's practice squad. He was elevated to the active roster on October 24 for the team's week 7 game against the Dallas Cowboys, and reverted to the practice squad after the game. Lawrence signed a reserve/futures contract with Washington on January 11, 2021, but was released on August 31, 2021.
