= Greer High School =

Location
- 3000 East Gap Creek Road; Greer, South Carolina 29651; United States

Information
- School type: Public high school
- Established: 1895 (131 years ago)
- School district: Greenville County School District
- Faculty: ~100
- Teaching staff: 80.10 (on an FTE basis)
- Grades: 9–12
- Enrollment: 1,304 (2026-2027)
- Student to teacher ratio: 17.64
- Colors: Vegas gold and black
- Mascot: Yellow Jackets
- Nickname: Jackets
- Rival: Blue Ridge High
- Yearbook: Le Flambeau
- Website: www.greenville.k12.sc.us/greerhs/

Greer High School is a public high school in Greer, South Carolina, United States. It is a moderately sized school in Greenville County, South Carolina.

Greer High School offers the International Baccalaureate program.

== History ==
=== Beginnings ===
Education in Greer started in the mid-1870's. Eight years of school were offered by a woman, Miss Sallie Cannon, in a small cabin near J.L. Green's residence. Greer High had its beginning in 1895 in a one-room log cabin on the property of J.L. Green. The furnishings of the school room were provided by one of Greer's first citizens, W.A. Hill.

=== Second and Third Building ===
When student enrollment became too large for the log cabin, Hill donated to the school a large room over a cotton gin house on what is now Hill Street. By 1898, the school was well established and helped attract new people to the area. In 1904, the third building opened. It was a three-story brick building across the street from the old Greer Library on Hill Street.

=== Davenport High School ===
In 1922, Davenport High School was completed. The school was named for D.D. Davenport, who paid most of the construction cost of $150,000. Greer High's first yearbook, "The Bantam" was published by the Class of 1923. In 1927, the school's alma mater which is still in use today was written through a schoolwide competition. Greer High's alma mater is set to the tune of Cornell University's "Far Above Cayuga's Waters" and has the following lyrics.

In the State of Carolina, near the mountains Blue.

Stands a noble structure, with a spirit true.

Lift your voices and your praises over hill and dale,

Hail thee to our alma mater, hail thee, Greer High, hail.

In 1935, the school motto ("Parantes pro Civante" / "Preparing for Citizenship"), the coat of arms (containing the palmetto tree, the yellow jacket, and the peach), and the first class ring were selected.

During this period, the yearbook had changed its name from "The Bantam" to "The Reflector".

In 1940–41, Greer High had its first band and its first edition of the school newspaper (the Greer High Times). Also in 1940–41, Greer High School changed the name of its yearbook to Le Flambeau, which is still the name in use today.

Davenport served as Greer's high school until 1953 when the building on North Main Street was completed. Davenport then became Davenport Junior High School until it was destroyed by a fire in 1970.

=== North Main Street Building ===
In 1953, a new Greer High building on North Main Street in Downtown Greer was completed. During this time, the school was either known as Greer High School or Greer Senior High School.

The auditorium was added to the campus in 1955.

Greer High School was enlarged in 1970, adding a new library and additional air-conditioned science classrooms on the first floor were added.

In 1986, a new football stadium near, what was at the time, Greer Middle School, was completed in 1986.

In 1987, the entire school was renovated, including air conditioning.

Greer High School relocated to a new campus at 3000 East Gap Creek Road in the summer of 1998.

The North Main Street Building was then used as Greer Middle School while a new Greer Middle School Building was under construction next-door to the East Gap Creek Road building and the current Greer Middle School building was being converted into Chandler Creek Elementary School. Following the completion of the new Greer Middle School building on East Gap Creek Road, the North Main Street Building was renovated and converted into a career center, first called Foothills Career Center, and then renamed J. Harley Bonds Career Center.

J. Harley Bonds Career Center has served as the Career Center for Greer, Riverside, Blue Ridge, Eastside, and Wade Hampton High School since the conversion. Greenville County Schools recommended J. Harley Bonds Career Center's building to be demolished and for a new facility to be constructed on the same site. The replacement is scheduled to be complete in 2031.

=== Current Building ===
The current building of Greer High School was completed in 1998. The building features a media center, an atrium area that represents the school's International Baccalaureate program, spacious Biology and Chemistry labs on the second floor, the 600-seat Margaret Burch Auditorium, Marion Waters Commons area, band and choral rooms, two art studios with a photography lab and ceramics kiln, Virtual Enterprise class lab, a secondary mini-gymnasium, and the 2000 seat Louis Phillips Gymnasium.

In 2020, construction was completed on the newly renovated Physical Education wing of the school building. The new wing features a new multi-purpose exercise/weight room, a new Athletic Training room, and new girls locker room.

== Feeder Schools ==
The primary feeder middle school of Greer High School is Greer Middle School. The primary feeder elementary schools of Greer High School are Crestview Elementary School and Chandler Creek Elementary School. Small groups of elementary school students who are zoned for Skyland Elementary School and Woodland Elementary School, which are schools that are primarily feeders for Blue Ridge High School and Riverside High School respectively, are zoned for Greer Middle and Greer High School.

== Athletics ==
The sports that Greer High School offers are listed below:

Sports offered at Greer High School
Boys	Girls
Cross Country	Cross Country
Football	Flag Football
Swimming	Golf
Basketball	Swimming
Wrestling	Tennis
Baseball	Volleyball
Golf	Basketball
Soccer	Wrestling
Track and Field	Soccer
	Softball
	Track and Field

== Student Clubs and Organizations ==
Student Clubs and Organizations at Greer High include an Art Club, National Art Honor Society, Marching Band, Book Club, Chess Club, Crochet Club, Board Game Club, Future Farmers of America (FFA), Leo Club, Mu Alpha Theta, National English Honor Society, National Honor Society, Speech and Debate, and Student Government.

== Notable alumni ==
- Benjamin O. Burnett - member of the South Carolina House of Representatives
- Daniel Palka - MLB player for the Chicago White Sox
- Troy Pride - NFL Cornerback
