= Shannon Faulkner =

American educator; first female Citadel recruit

- Born: Powdersville, South Carolina, United States

Shannon Faulkner is an American teacher, best known for being the first female cadet to attend The Citadel Military College in 1995, following a successful lawsuit challenging the school's male-only admissions policy. She currently teaches English in Greenville, South Carolina.

== Biography ==
Faulkner was born in 1975 in Powdersville, South Carolina, United States. She attended Wren High School, where she was a member of the debate team, and graduated with honors in January 1993. Faulkner was frustrated that The Citadel would not allow women. Faulkner became the first woman to attempt to enter the Corps of Cadets at The Citadel, which had a male-only admissions policy. The high school transcripts she submitted as part of her application had all references to her gender blanked out. In January 1993, on the basis of her academic record and achievements, Faulkner's application was initially accepted; however, that February, after discovering she was a woman, The Citadel revoked their offer of admission.

On March 2, 1993 Faulkner filed suit against The Citadel, contending that the state-funded school's gender-based admissions policy was in violation of the equal protection clause of the U.S. Constitution. Her lawyer, Val Vojdik, said, "We are seeking educational opportunity... We are seeking equal access to a public program we pay for." The subsequent legal battle lasted for over 2 years.

In January 1994, a federal judge ordered the school to admit Faulkner for day classes during the spring semester as a civilian student, which meant she had to be off campus by the time retreat was played, and she was not allowed to reside in the barracks or wear the cadet's uniform. That July, a U.S. district court ruled that the school also had to admit her to the Corps of Cadets. In April 1995, the Fourth Circuit Court of Appeals upheld that ruling. On August 11, 1995 a motion filed by the defendants with the United States Supreme Court requesting an emergency order to bar Faulkner's entry was denied by Chief Justice William Rehnquist.

Of the extreme, violent, male-dominated culture of the school at that time, journaliat Susan Faludi wrote: "That this crucible of masculine transformation could be misogynistic was a vast understatement." Faludi writes that one former cadet, Michael Lake, told her "According to the Citadel creed of the cadet, women have no rights. They are objects. They are things that you can do with whatever you want to." She described how "newly arrived female faculty members reported receiving obscene phone calls as well as pornographic messages and drawings," among other types of harassment, including death threats. Another former cadet told her "that bragging about humiliating an ex-girlfriend was a common practice – and the more outrageous the humiliation, the better the story," and that girlfriends of the cadets were frequently subject to abuse. The Citadel cadets were also known to sing joadies with misogynistic lyrics, "including lyrics about gouging out a woman’s eyes, lopping off body parts, and evisceration."

On the day after Thanksgiving 1993, Faulkner's parents' home in Powdersville was vandalized; someone had written, in huge letters, "BITCH, DYKE, WHORE, and LESBO," across the white siding of the house with red paint. More vandalism at the house followed over the course of the year, including a motorist running over their mailbox with, someone prying on the emergency exhaust valve on their water heater, and another who pried open the gas tank of her mother's car.

A few days after the judge ordered that Faulkner be admitted to the Corps of Cadets, a group of cadets put up a sign along a busy Charleston road which read "DIE SHANNON". According to Faludi, "Tom Lucas, a graduate student in the Citadel's evening program, told me about one bit of graffito in a campus men's room that stuck in his mind: 'Let her in-then fuck her to death.'" As Faludi writes, "this was the world that Shannon Faulkner had applied to enter."

Faulkner took The Citadel oath and matriculated into the otherwise all-male Corps of Cadets on August 14, 1995 under the escort of United States Marshals. The school established that only five male cadets would be authorized to speak to her; anyone else risked disciplinary action.

The following day, which was the first day of "Hell Week", the area was hit by 100-degree weather. A black flag was hoisted, which warned of the heat and signaled that cadets were to drink water frequently. At lunch, the cadets were forced to eat large quantities of a noodle casserole, and Faulkner began feeling ill. After vomiting, Faulkner reported that she felt nauseous to Ray Gerber, her cadreman who was one of the five cadets authorized to speak to her. Gerber escorted Faulkner and four male cadets, who were also suffering from heat-stress to the infirmary. She rejoined the corps two hours later. Concerned about the soupy weather in the 100s, the commandant's office decreed that there were to be no outdoor activities until the heat moved on. Despite all exercises taking place inside a climate-controlled gymnasium, Faulkner still continued to be nauseated. She then returned to the infirmary, where she spent the remainder of that week before washing out, citing emotional and psychological abuse and physical exhaustion. Faulkner was one of thirty cadets to drop out; Richard Lacayo, writing in Time Magazine on August 27, said "At least 30 cadets dropped out of the Citadel’s freshman class last week. Shannon Faulkner is the only one whose name people will remember."

When her withdrawal from The Citadel was announced, upperclassmen celebrated their return to an all-male school, with one cadreman leading the recruits in an altered marching song of "Marching down the avenue. Now we know that Faulkner's through. I am happy and so are you!". She told Oprah Winfrey on her show that she had gained weight during the lawsuit due to the stress she was facing.

Two decades later, in a 2012 interview with the Post and Courier newspaper, Faulkner said that what precipitated her leaving so abruptly was a threat to kill her parents by a person present when she entered. Her parents' home was vandalized. In 1999, she told the Associated Press, "I went into it knowing I may not get anything out of it. I was doing it for the next woman."

Writer Pat Conroy paid for Faulkner's education after she left the Citadel, and she became a middle school teacher in South Carolina. Faulkner attended Furman University and later Anderson College, where she graduated in 1999 with a degree in secondary education. After graduating she was hired by Carolina High School.

== In popular culture ==
- Lisa Simpson's experience in The Simpsons' 8th-season finale, "The Secret War of Lisa Simpson" (1997) was partly inspired by Faulkner.
- Hank Hill indirectly references Faulkner in King of the Hill's 5th episode of season 2 titled "Jumpin' Crack Bass" (1997). She is referred to as "that pushy gal who's tryin' to get into The Citadel".
- The Skulls III (2004) was inspired by Faulkner's story.
