= Jackson Gosnell =

American journalist

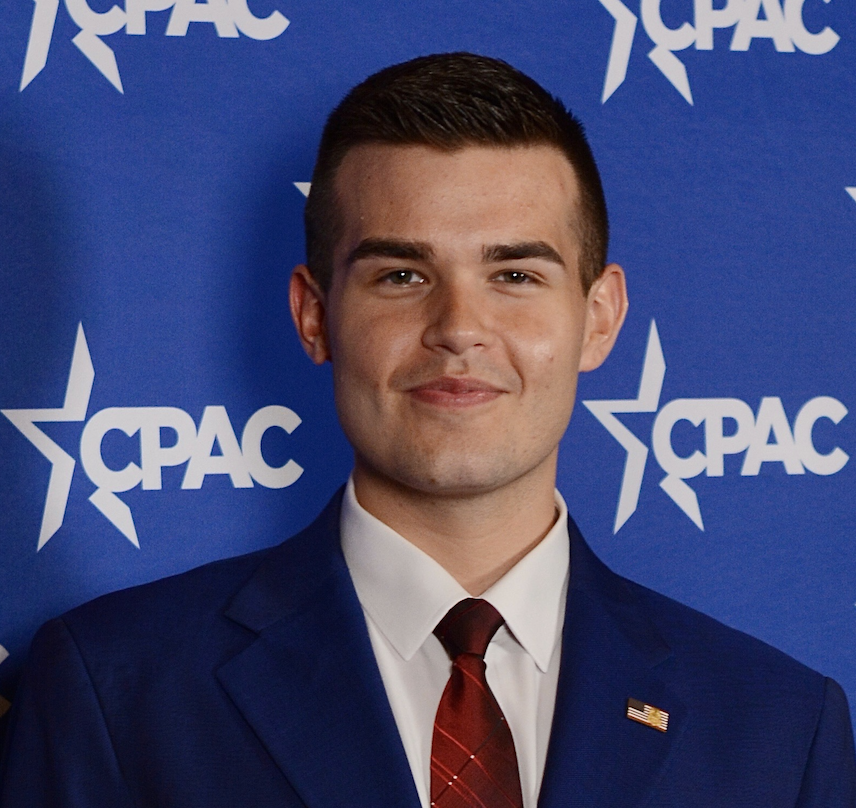
- Gosnell at the 2026 Conservative Political Action Conference in Grapevine, Texas
- Born: Greenville, South Carolina, U.S.
- Education: Blue Ridge High School; University of South Carolina
- Occupation: Political commentator

Jackson Gosnell is an American right-wing political commentator. He is known for his reporting and commentary across television, digital news outlets, and social media platforms, with appearances on U.S. and international news programs covering American politics, media, and breaking news events.

Gosnell first gained national attention as a teenager through consumer reporting related to robocall legal settlements before later becoming known for political commentary and on-the-ground reporting from political events and media briefings.

== Early life and education ==
Gosnell was born and raised in Greenville, South Carolina, in the Upstate region of the state. He attended Blue Ridge High School, where he began producing short-form news videos covering local and national issues.

At age 16, Gosnell gained national media attention after appearing on Inside Edition and other outlets for reporting on consumer protection and legal settlements involving robocallers. During the COVID-19 pandemic, he began publishing news-style videos on social media platforms, covering public policy, school closures, and community-level impacts. Gosnell attended the University of South Carolina, where he studied Mass Communications.

== Career ==
=== Journalism and international correspondence ===
During the COVID-19 pandemic and its aftermath, Gosnell worked as a U.S.-based correspondent for Australian digital news outlets, delivering weekly updates on American politics, government policy, and pandemic-related developments. His reporting included interviews with parents, students, and community members addressing school reopening plans and public health responses.

=== Political commentary and media work ===
Gosnell later shifted his professional focus toward political commentary, adopting a right-leaning perspective. He has appeared as a guest or contributor on television and digital platforms, including Fox News, NewsNation, Inside Edition, Fox 5 Washington, D.C., Newsmax, One America News Network, and Canadian outlets such as The News Forum.

He has reported from political events in Washington, D.C., including creator and media briefings at the White House, Capitol Hill, and Republican-affiliated media rows.

Gosnell has interviewed political candidates, public officials, and media figures, including Robert F. Kennedy Jr., Marianne Williamson, Kayleigh McEnany, and various presidential and congressional candidates. Following the attempted assassination of former U.S. President Donald Trump in Butler, Pennsylvania, in 2024, and the assassination of conservative commentator Charlie Kirk in 2025, Gosnell’s political commentary became more prominent, with increased focus on political violence, media coverage, and national political discourse.

In addition to television appearances, Gosnell has written political commentary and reporting for digital outlets, including a brief period as a contributor to The Daily Caller.
