= Golden Strip Career Center =

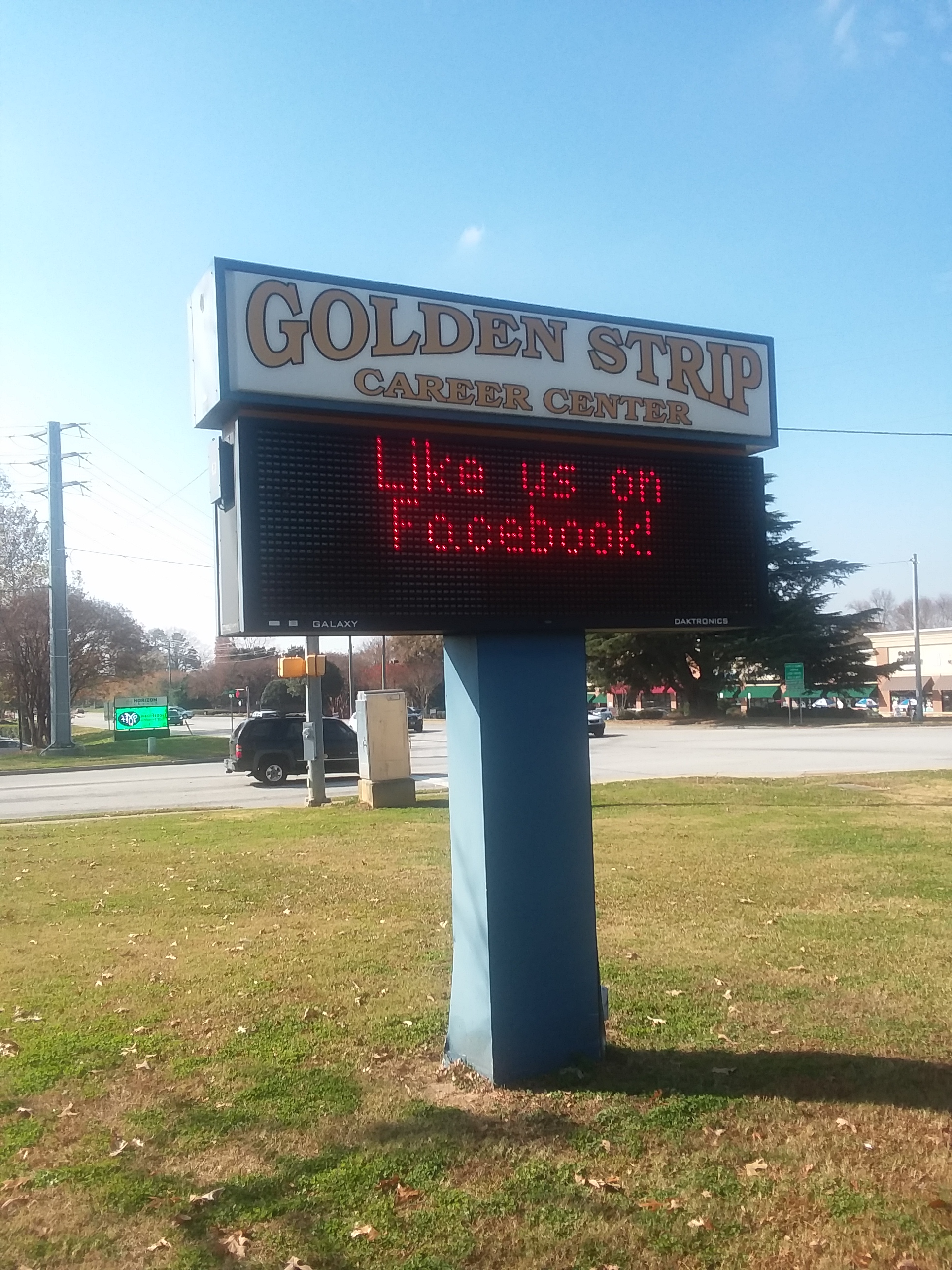

Location
- 1120 East Butler Rd. Greenville, South Carolina 29607; United States
- Coordinates: 34°48′42″N 82°16′32″W

Information
- School type: Public, vocational school
- School district: Greenville County School District
- Director: JF Lucas
- Grades: 9-12
- Website: www.greenville.k12.sc.us/gstripcc/

Golden Strip Career Center (GSCC) is one of four part-time secondary vocational schools in the Greenville County School District located in Greenville, South Carolina, United States. The school offers a variety of programs, each with a focus on some specific career field, and students can earn certifications, licenses, and even college credit following the completion of such programs. Most students at Golden Strip Career Center are also enrolled in non-alternative high schools in the school district; therefore, school bus transportation between these schools and the career center is provided on school days.

== History ==
Golden Strip Career Center was named after "the Golden Strip," an informal collective title for the cities of Fountain Inn, Simpsonville, and Mauldin; though the school technically is addressed in Greenville, it is just outside of Mauldin.

The firefighting program at the school was established in January 2013.

On the morning of February 24, 2016, several buildings at the campus were damaged due to a windstorm. No people that were on campus at that time were hurt or injured.

== Programs ==
Golden Strip Career Center offers the following programs:

- Automotive collision repair
- Automotive technology
- Animation and digital multimedia
- Building construction
- Cosmetology
- Culinary arts
- Early childhood education
- Firefighting
- HVAC
- Law, public safety, corrections, and security
- Logistics and business processes
- Machine tool technology
- Mechatronics
- Nail technology
- Welding

== Events ==
On several occasions, Greenville County School District has held job fairs at the career center, due to a shortage in district employees such as bus drivers and janitors.
