= Greenville Senior High School =

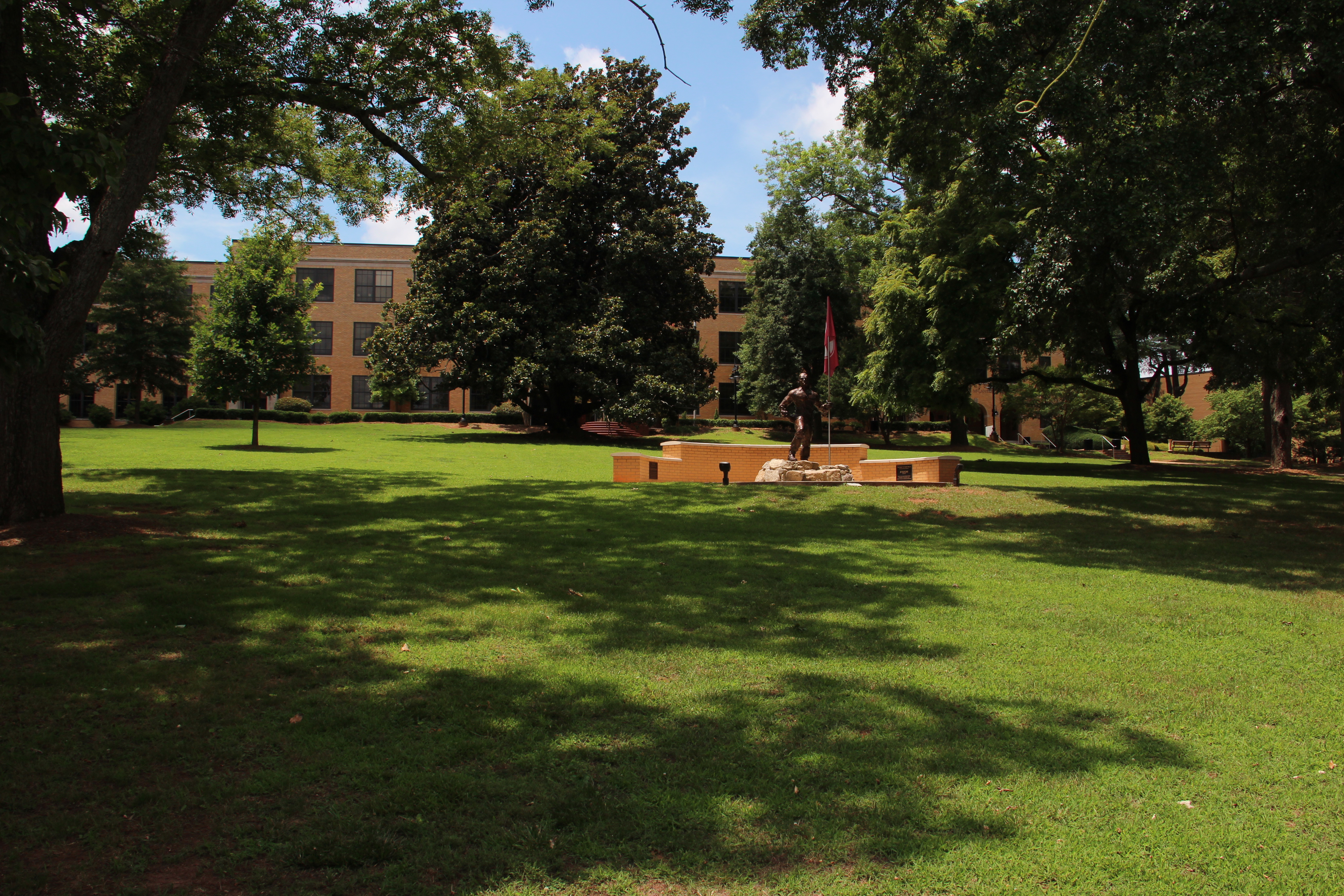
- Greenville Senior High School in 2019

Location
- 1 Vardry Street; Greenville, South Carolina 29601; United States; 34°50′25″N 82°24′26″W

Information
- Other names: Greenville High Academy, Greenville Senior High Academy
- Former name: Greenville High School
- Type: Public secondary magnet school
- Motto: Latin: Veritas Vos Liberabit (The truth will set you free)
- Established: 1888; 138 years ago
- School district: Greenville County School District
- Principal: Dylan Hudson
- Staff: 15 (2018–19)
- Faculty: 94 (2018–19)
- Teaching staff: 92.70 (FTE)
- Grades: 9–12
- Gender: Co-educational
- Enrollment: 1,645 (2026–2027)
- Student to teacher ratio: 19.32
- Colors: Red and white
- Mascot: Red Raider
- Newspaper: Raiderpress
- Yearbook: Nautilus
- Website: www.greenville.k12.sc.us/gvilleh/
- Last updated: July 2, 2019; 7 years ago

Greenville Senior High School (also known as Greenville Senior High Academy, GHS, GSHS, Greenville Senior High Academy of Law, Finance, and Business, and Greenville High Academy) is a public high school and magnet school located in Greenville, South Carolina.

== History ==
Greenville High School was established in 1888. Greenville Senior High School has had three buildings since its establishment. The first, 'The Old Central School' was used presumably since the schools opening until 1921. The second building opened in 1921 and was in use as Greenville Senior High School until 1938. The current building opened in 1938 and received major renovations in 2007.

== Facilities ==
=== High School ===
Greenville Senior High School's current building opened its doors in 1938. The facility was paid for in part by the Public Works Administration (PWA) and was built in Classical Moderne style typical of New Deal architecture. The building is a three-story yellow brick building.

In 2007, as part of a district-wide building plan to improve school facilities, the building received extensive renovations. The school's courtyard was covered to create an atrium and commons, the school's auditorium was renovated, and a new 70,000 square foot, three story addition was added to the school. The renovation also added computer and science labs, smart boards in every classroom, and new athletics and training fields. In addition, a new gymnasium was constructed as part of the renovations.

In 2019, the school added a new Strength and Conditioning Facility.

=== Sirrine Stadium ===
The Public Works Administration (PWA) also funded the construction of Sirrine Stadium in 1936. The historic stadium has served as the home of Greenville Senior High School football games since 1936. The stadium also hosts Greenville High's soccer and lacrosse games.

== Magnet Academy ==
Greenville Senior High School's Magnet Academy features three programs. The Academy of Law features more extensive law education classes then any other school in Greenville County School District. The Academy of Business and the Academy of Finance both offer several specialized classes for students to take.

== Feeder Schools ==
The primary feeder middle schools of Greenville Senior High School are Hughes Academy, League Academy, and Sevier Middle School. Primary feeder elementary schools include Augusta Circle Elementary School, A.J. Whittenburg Elementary School, Blythe Academy, Hollis Academy, Monaview Elementary School, Stone Academy, and Summit Drive Elementary.

== Non Core-Subject Classes ==
In addition to the four traditional core-subject subjects (English, Math, Social Studies, and Science) and the Magnet Academy, Greenville Senior High offers various classes in World Language, Fine Arts, Physical Education, and Career and Technological Education.

=== World Languages ===
Greenville Senior High School offers three languages in its World Language Department for students to study. Spanish, French, and Latin.

=== Fine Arts ===
Fine Arts classes at Greenville Senior High School include art, photography, ceramics, theatre, band, chorus, and orchestra.

=== Career and Technical Education ===
Career and Technical Education classes and/or pathways offered at Greenville Senior High School, not including those offered through the Magnet Academy, include animation, game design, marketing, sports medicine, and hospitality.

==== The Branch at Greenville High School ====
The Branch at Greenville High School is a student-ran credit union located within Greer High School. The Branch at Greenville High School was established through a partnership between Greenville County School District, Greenville Senior High School, and Greenville Federal Credit Union.

=== Physical Education ===
In addition to Physical Education 1, which is a required course to be taken in South Carolina. The Physical Education department at Greenville Senior High School offers leisure sports and team sports classes.

== Athletics ==
The sports that Greenville Senior High School offers are listed below:

Sports offered at Greenville Senior High School
Boys	Girls
Cross Country	Cross Country
Football	Flag Football
Swimming	Golf
Basketball	Swimming
Wrestling	Tennis
Baseball	Volleyball
Golf	Basketball
Lacrosse	Wrestling
Soccer	Lacrosse
Tennis	Soccer
Track and Field	Softball
	Track and Field

== Extracurriculars and Traditions ==
=== Extracurriculars/Clubs ===
Greenville High is home to many clubs and organizations for students to join. These include, but are not limited to, an Academic Team, Beta Club, Black Student Union, DAYLO (Diversity Awareness Youth Literacy), Drama Club, Fellowship of Christian Athletes (FCA), French Honor Society, Art Club, Veterinary Club, Hispanic Heritage Club, International Thespian Society, Language Clubs (French Club, Latin Club, Spanish Club), Mock Trial Team, National Honor Society, Raider Alliance, Robotics Team, Tabletop Gaming Club, Speech and Debate Team, and Student Council.

Greenville's theatre department presents biannual productions: a play in the fall and a musical in the spring. Any student who attends the school is able to audition for a role in these productions and apply for backstage positions. These productions have typically had three shows (two at night Friday and Saturday and one matinee Sunday), but starting with spring 2024's Hairspray, the musicals have started having four showings (three at night Thursday to Saturday and one matinee Sunday).

=== Traditions ===
Greenville has a rivalry with J.L. Mann High School. During "spirit week", a week-long charity event typically held in September, Greenville and J.L. Mann compete to raise more money than each other through extracurricular school events and activities. At the end of spirit week, a football game between the two schools is held, during which the amount of money both schools raised is revealed at the half.

Greenville holds a fall homecoming dance, in addition to a homecoming football game, and a spring promenade dance. During homecoming week, there are several dress-up days for students to participate in.

== Notable alumni ==
- Rudolf Anderson – first recipient of the Air Force Cross
- Harry Ashmore – journalist
- Robert T. Ashmore - U.S. Congressional Representative for South Carolina
- Mazeo Bennett – football player
- Phillip Boykin – singer, actor
- Carroll A. Campbell Jr. – governor of South Carolina
- Sarah Cunningham – actress
- Dick Dietz – professional baseball player
- Charles Fernley Fawcett – soldier, airman, actor
- Thomas T. Goldsmith Jr. – inventor
- Clement Haynsworth – U.S. federal judge
- Dick Hendley – professional football player
- John D. Hollingsworth – businessman, inventor, philanthropist
- David Jones – professional football player
- Tommy Jones - professional bowler
- Herman Lay – chairman and chief executive officer of Frito-Lay
- Douglas Leigh – advertising executive
- Gabriel H. Mahon Jr. – U.S. congressional representative for South Carolina
- James Mann – U.S. congressional representative for South Carolina
- Jim Mattos – member of South Carolina House of Representatives
- Raven I. McDavid Jr. – American English linguist
- Sandi Morris – Olympic pole vault medalist
- Robert G. Owens Jr., Major general, U.S. Marine Corps and flying ace
- Emile Pandolfi – pianist
- Charles V. Pyle Jr. – judge and politician
- Richard Riley – governor of South Carolina, U.S. Education Secretary
- Rory Scovel – comedian, actor, and writer
- Bennie Lee Sinclair – poet, novelist, writer
- Carson Spiers – baseball player
- Butch Taylor – professional basketball player
- Nick Theodore – lieutenant governor of South Carolina
- George Tindall – historian, author
- Charles H. Townes – physicist, inventor
- John B. Watson – psychologist
- David H. Wilkins – attorney, politician, ambassador
- William Walter Wilkins – U.S. federal judge
- Joanne Woodward – Academy Award-winning actress
