= First Baptist Simpsonville =

Historic church in South Carolina, United States

- U.S. National Register of Historic Places
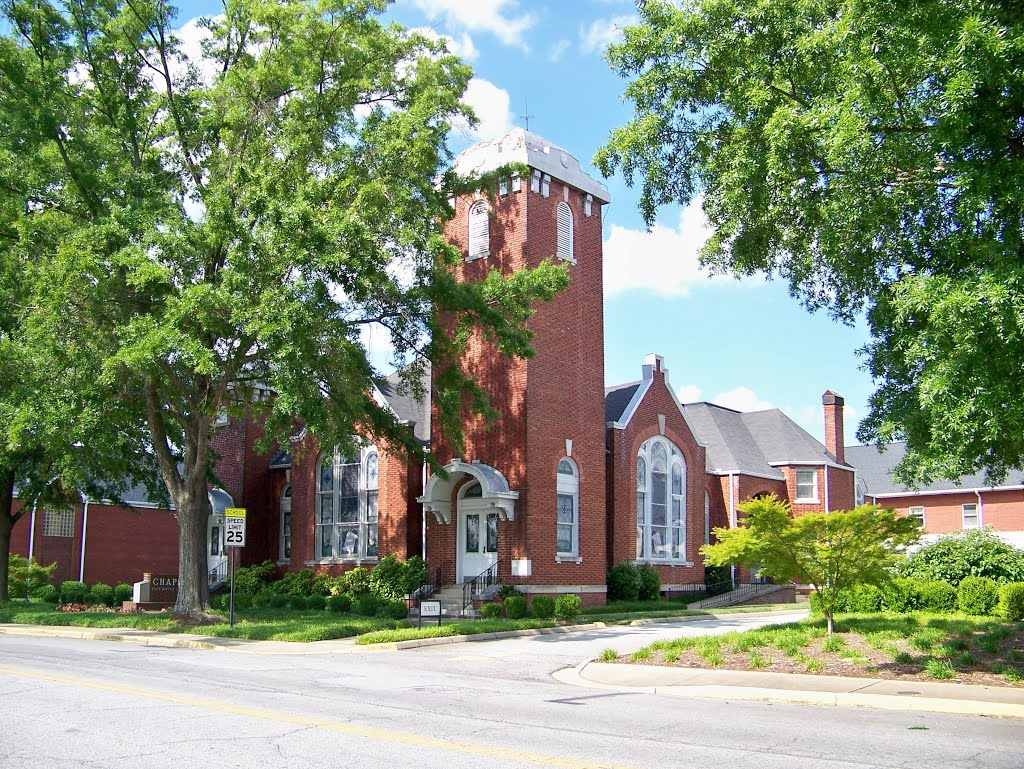

- Location within South Carolina Location within the United States
- Location: 106 Church St., Simpsonville, South Carolina
- Coordinates: 34°44′21″N 82°15′10″W
- Area: less than one acre
- Built: 1913
- Architect: Proffit, Luther D.; Gibson, E.J.
- Architectural style: Romanesque
- NRHP reference No.: 92001309
- Added to NRHP: October 13, 1992

First Baptist Simpsonville, formerly Simpsonville Baptist Church, is a historic Baptist church based in Simpsonville, South Carolina, United States. It is affiliated with the Southern Baptist Convention.

== History ==
It was established in 1888 by F.H. Martin. It inaugurated its first building in 1889. It inaugurated a chapel in 1914, which was added to the National Register in 1992. In 1997, it inaugurated a community center. In 2004, it began establishing campuses in the region. It inaugurated a new 1,500-seat auditorium in 2008.

According to a church census released in 2023, it claimed 7,091 members and 6 campuses in different cities.
