= Cureton-Huff House =

- U.S. National Register of Historic Places
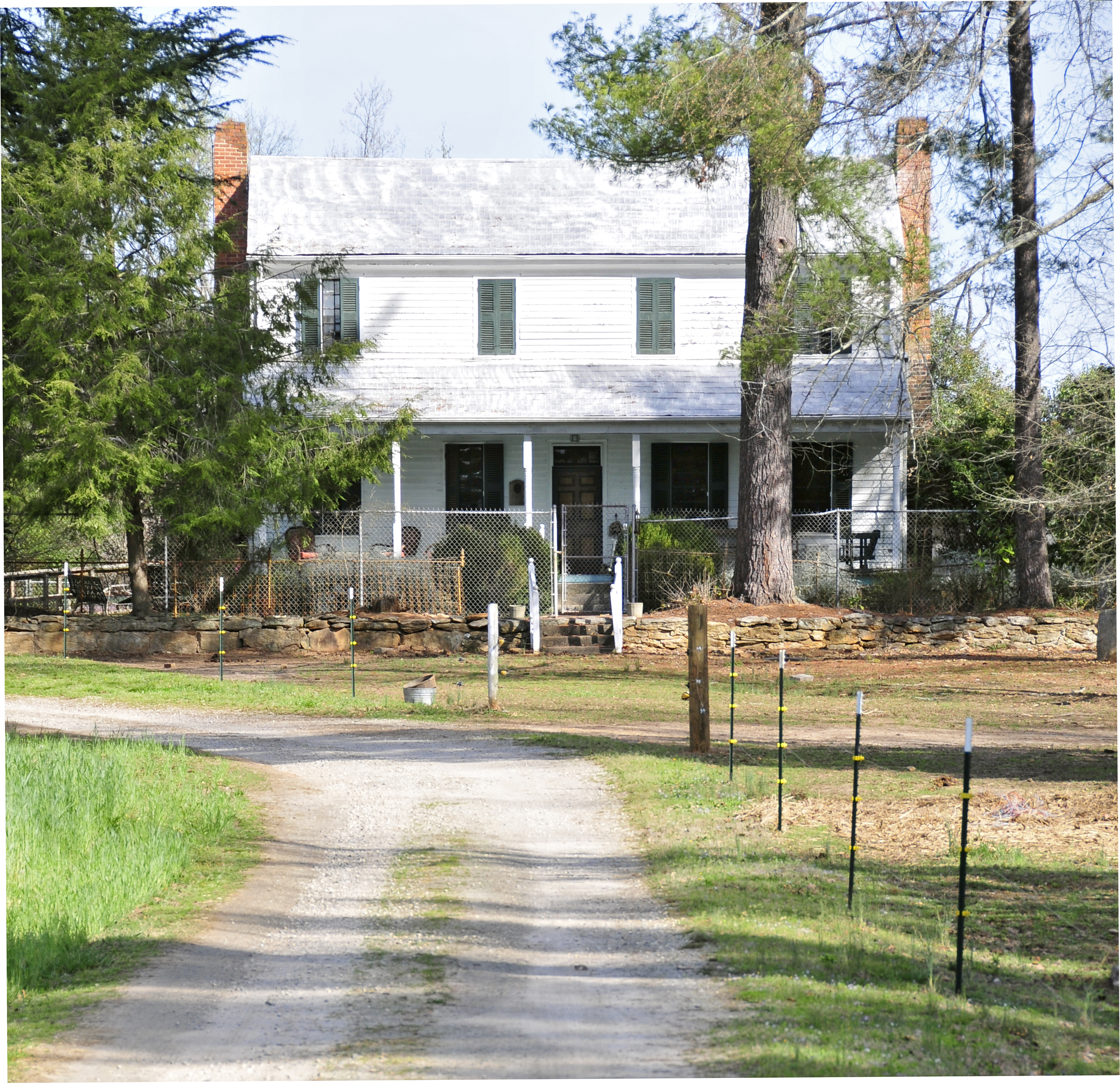
- The Cureton-Huff House in 2012

- Location within South Carolina Location within the United States
- Nearest city: Simpsonville, South Carolina
- Coordinates: 34.693127°N 82.334113°W
- Area: 13 acres (5.3 ha)
- Built: 1820
- NRHP reference No.: 83002196
- Added to NRHP: January 13, 1983

The Cureton-Huff House is located in Greenville County near Simpsonville, South Carolina, United States, on what is now known as West Georgia Road, or County Road 541. The two-story braced-frame farmhouse on a brick pier foundation was built ca 1820 for John Moon Cureton, a wealthy farmer. It was originally built in the common hall-and-parlor configuration but shortly after its initial construction, the house was altered to a central-hall configuration. Despite more modern additions to the rear of the house including a kitchen, bathrooms, dining room and office, the majority of the house has retained its original, historic Federal-period detailing.

The property the house sits on includes several barns and animal pens, corn cribs, a garage, a blacksmith shop and a carriage house. A family cemetery, surrounded by a low stone wall, is also located on the property. The house and property is still owned by descendants of John Moon Cureton.
