= Burdette Building =

- U.S. National Register of Historic Places
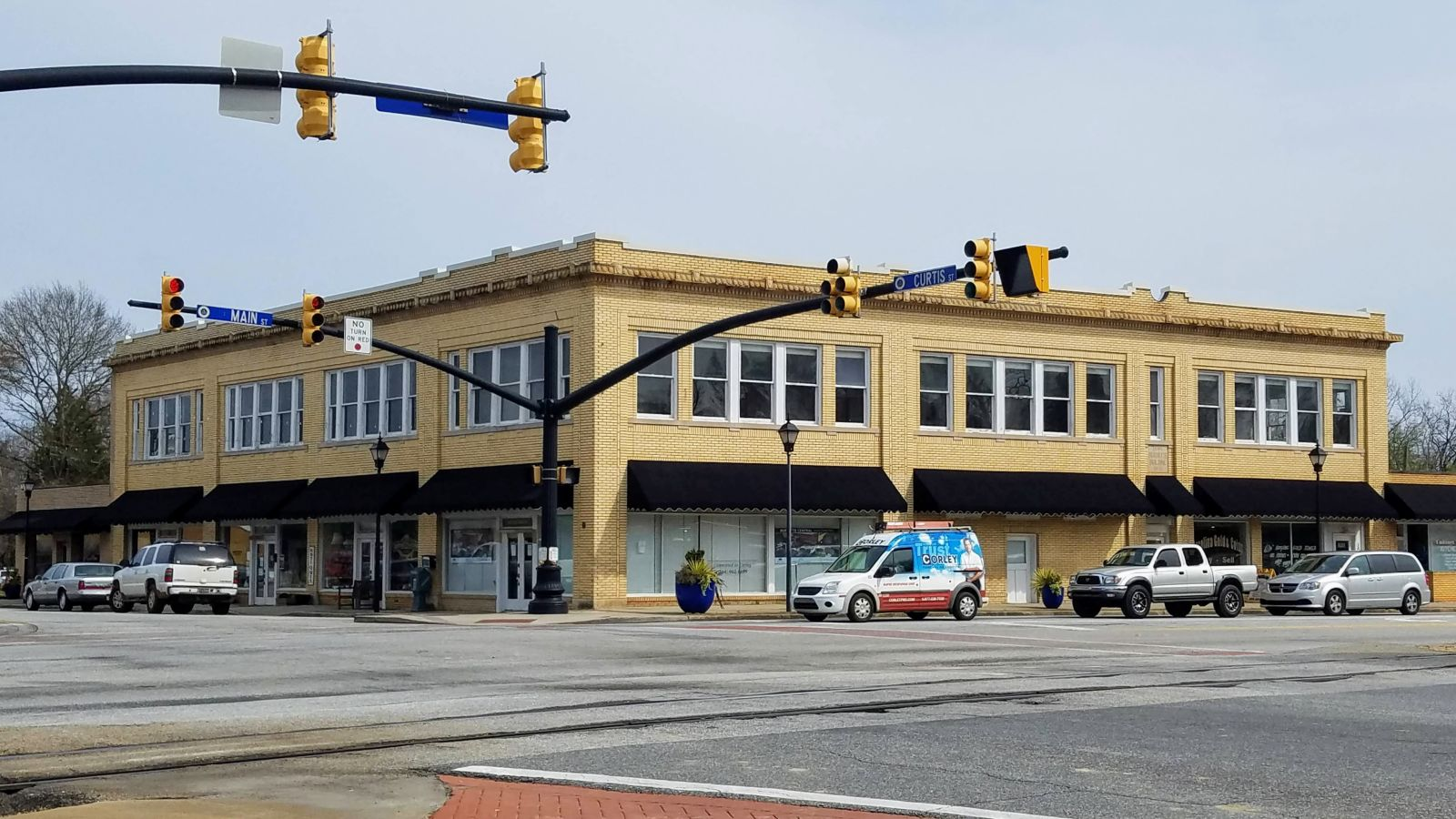

- Location within South Carolina Location within the United States
- Location: 104 E. Curtis St., Simpsonville, South Carolina
- Coordinates: 34°44′14″N 82°15′19″W
- Area: less than one acre
- Built: 1921
- Architectural style: Early Commercial
- NRHP reference No.: 03000660
- Added to NRHP: July 17, 2003

The Burdette Building, also known as Burdette Hardware Building or B.W. Burdette Building, in Simpsonville, South Carolina, was listed on the U.S. National Register of Historic Places in 2003. It is a two-story building with brick walls laid in running bond, interrupted by pilasters. It was built in 1921 to replace the wood frame and brick building on the same site which had been destroyed by a fire. It was the largest building in Simpsonville and it stimulated the commercial economy which otherwise was waning. It is located across the street from 101 East Curtis Street and the Simpsonville Clock Tower.

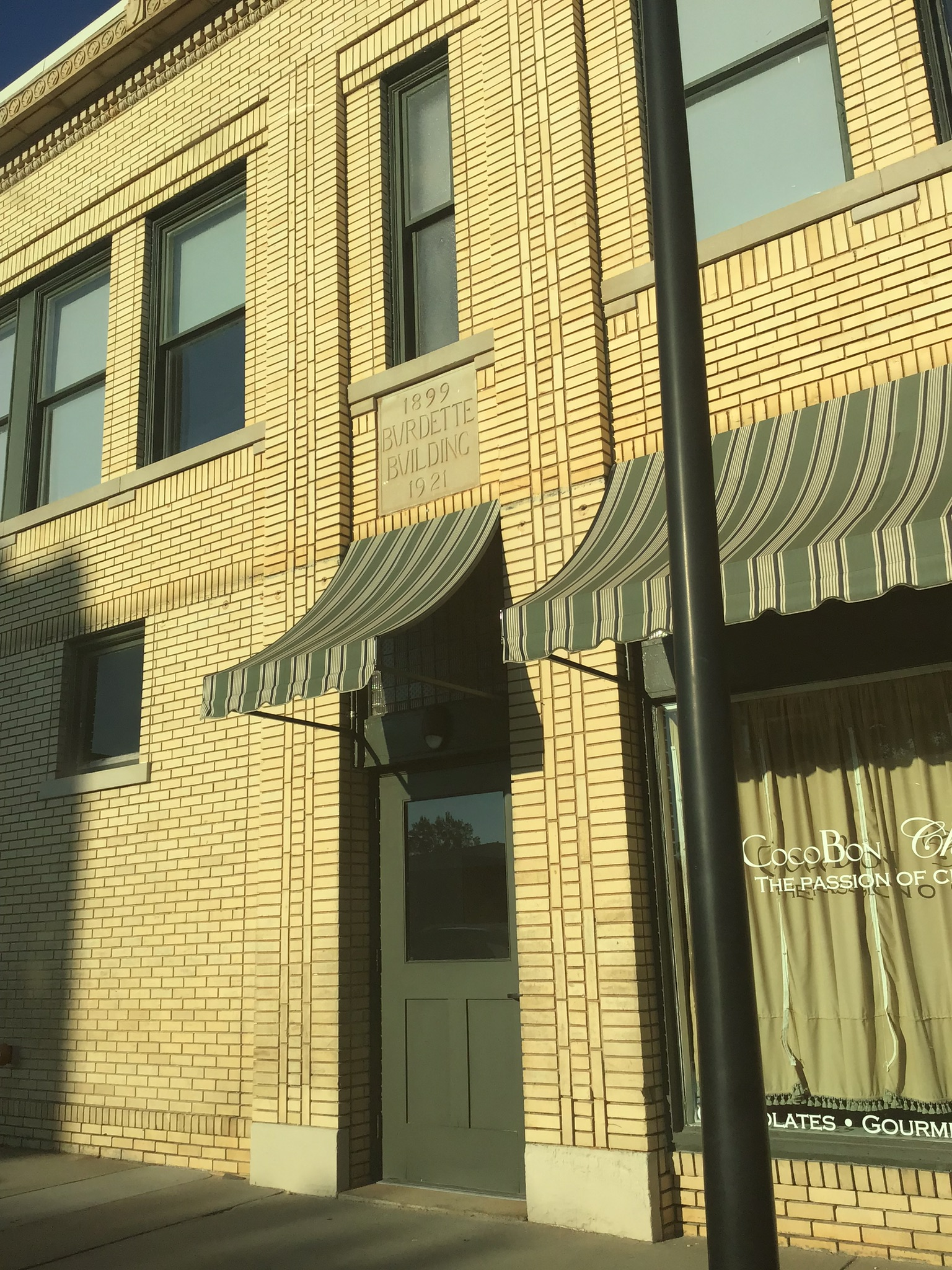
Sign engraved into the side of the Burdette Building in Simpsonville, SC commemorating its completion year.
