= Roper Mountain Science Center =

- Established: 1985
- Location: 402 Roper Mountain Road, Greenville, South Carolina 29615
- Type: Science museum
- Owner: Greenville County School District
- Website: Official website

Roper Mountain Science Center is located in Greenville, South Carolina. It encompasses a campus containing facilities for studying life and natural sciences, space and physical sciences. Among its facilities are the Living History Farm, the Darrell W. Harrison Hall of Natural Sciences, the Simms Hall of Science, the T.C. Hooper Planetarium, and the Daniel Observatory. The center is a part of the Greenville County School District.

== History ==
Roper Mountain Science Center was started as a unique partnership between public and private resources. Initial planning for the center began in 1982 and the center opened in 1985.

== Charles E. Daniel Observatory ==
Charles E. Daniel Observatory
- Alternative names: ropermountain.org
- Location: Greenville, South Carolina
- Coordinates: 34°50′24″N 82°18′27″W
- Altitude: 363 metres (1,191 ft)
- Website: Website

Telescopes
- Halsted Refractor: 58.4 cm (23.0 in)

The principal telescope at the observatory is a 58.4 cm (23.0 in) refracting telescope. the objective lens was made by Alvan Clark and Sons. The telescope, which was finished in 1882, was installed at the Halsted Observatory of Princeton University. The telescope was rebuilt in 1933 by J. W. Fecker Company. The telescope was transferred to the US Naval Observatory in 1964. In 1968, it was offered to the Greenville County School District. The telescope was renovated and an observatory was built through a donation from the Charles E. Daniel Family Foundation. It is the eighth largest refractor telescope in the United States.
