= Golden Strip =

"The Golden Strip" is an informal collective title for the South Carolina cities of Fountain Inn, Simpsonville, and Mauldin, which stretch along Interstate 385 in Greenville County south of the city of Greenville.

Historically, the term was used because of new water installments added to the three cities.

The area is often characterized today with its fast-paced economic growth. Several establishments in the cities use the term "Golden Strip" in their titles, such as the "Golden Strip Freeway," a nickname for the portion of Interstate 385 that is in the area, and the Golden Strip Career Center, a vocational high school in Mauldin.

== See also ==
- Greenville County, South Carolina
- Upstate South Carolina
