= Travelers Rest High School =

Public high school in Travelers Rest, South Carolina, US

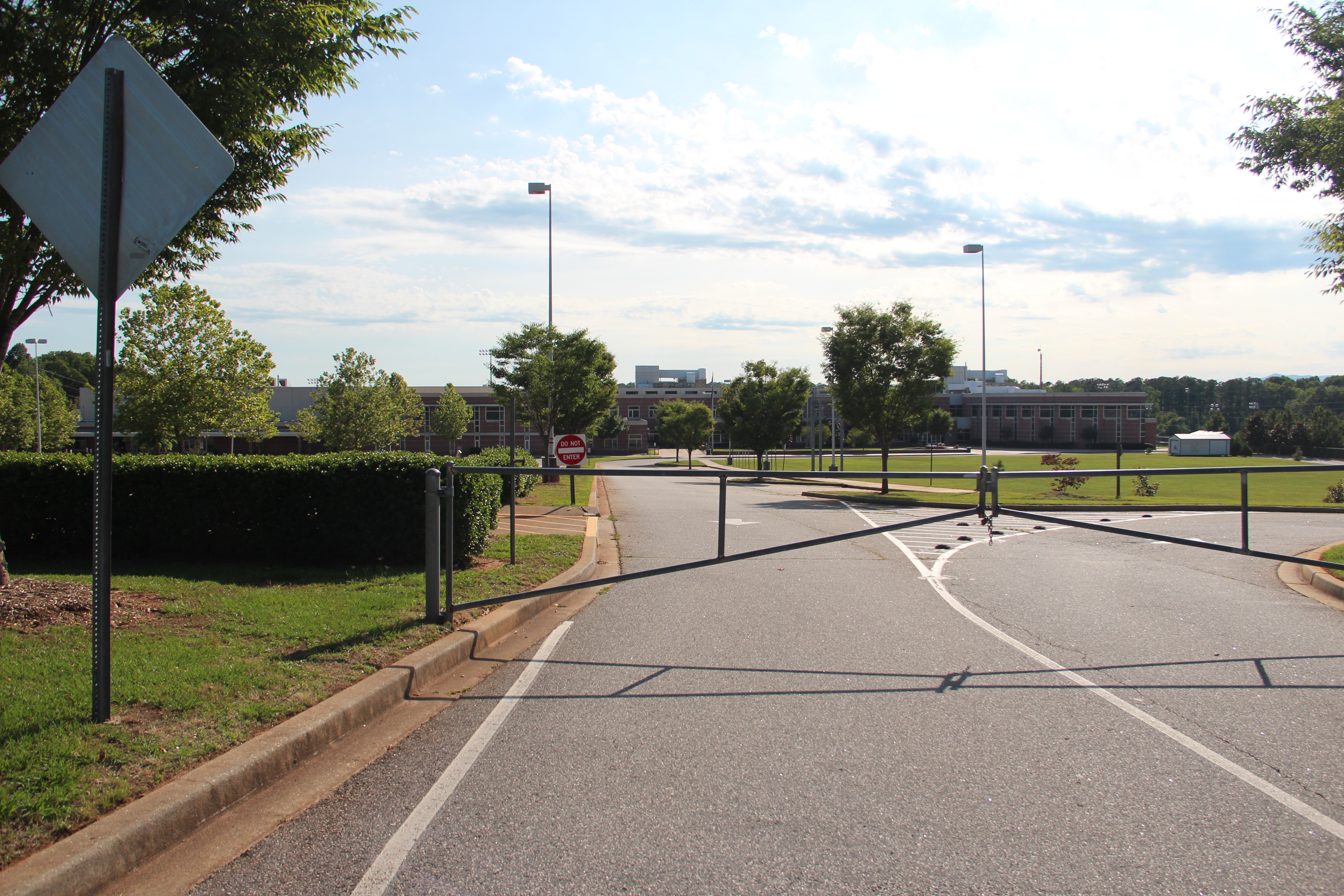

Location
- 301 North Main Street; Travelers Rest, South Carolina 29690; United States; 34°58′15″N 82°27′2″W

Information
- Type: Public
- Motto: We Are TR
- Principal: Daniel Bruce
- Teaching staff: 66.50 (FTE)
- Grades: 9–12
- Enrollment: 1,277 (2024–2025)
- Student to teacher ratio: 19.20
- Colors: Blue and gold
- Mascot: Devildogs
- Rivals: Berea High School
- Yearbook: The Traveler
- Website: www.greenville.k12.sc.us/trest/index.asp

Travelers Rest High School (TRHS) is a public high school in Travelers Rest, South Carolina, United States. It is part of Greenville County Schools, the largest school district in South Carolina. The school serves grades 9 through 12 and is an International Baccalaureate (IB) World School offering the IB Diploma Programme.

== History ==
Travelers Rest High School has served the northern Greenville County area since the early 20th century. In the 1920s, the school’s athletic teams were nicknamed the “Purple Flashes” and “Swamp Rabbits.” In 1950, the “Devildogs” nickname was adopted by a vote of the football team.

A major campus was built in 1956, which remained in use for decades. The building appeared in the 2008 film Leatherheads starring George Clooney. It was demolished in 2011, and the site was transformed into Trailblazer Park, an outdoor amphitheater and event venue.

The current TRHS campus opened in 2005 at 301 North Main Street, featuring modern educational and athletic facilities.

== Campus and facilities ==
The 2005-built campus includes updated academic buildings, science and technology labs, a library/media center, auditorium, and dedicated fine arts spaces. Athletic facilities include:

- A football stadium with a track
- Baseball and softball fields
- Tennis courts
- A main gym for basketball and volleyball
- Practice fields and weight room

The school is located near the Swamp Rabbit Trail, promoting outdoor education and community events. Bricks from the former school building were incorporated into the Travelers Rest History Museum.

== Academics ==
Travelers Rest High School offers a comprehensive academic program with standard, honors, AP, and International Baccalaureate courses. TRHS is an IB World School and a High Schools That Work site. Students can also pursue dual-enrollment and career/technical education (CTE) electives.

TRHS students have received over $7 million in scholarships in recent graduating years, and many qualify for the Palmetto Fellows and LIFE scholarships in South Carolina.

== Athletics ==
TRHS competes in the South Carolina High School League (SCHSL) Class AAAA. The school’s mascot is the Devildog, and its main rival is Berea High School.

=== Sports offered ===
- Football
- Basketball
- Soccer
- Baseball / Softball
- Volleyball
- Wrestling
- Cross country / Track & field
- Golf
- Tennis
- Cheerleading

=== Achievements ===
- Boys' Basketball – State Champions (1963, 1964)
- Boys' Tennis – State Champions (1969, 1980)
- Girls' Volleyball – State Champions (1986)
- Boys' Golf – State Champions (1998, 2001)
- Cheerleading – Regional and state placements in recent years

== Notable alumni ==
- Ryan McGee – ESPN journalist and co-host of Marty & McGee
- Duke Dennis — YouTuber

== Principals ==
- Otis “Blackie” Carter – 1920s (early athletics leader)
- Randy Dozier – 1990–1995
- Dr. Louis Lavely – 2002–2019
- Daniel Bruce – 2019–2026
- Michelle Michael – 2026-present

== Demographics ==
As of the 2023–24 school year, TRHS had an enrollment of 1,303 students. The student body is approximately:

- 74% White
- 14% Black
- 9% Hispanic
- 3% other/multiracial

Roughly two-thirds of students qualify for free or reduced lunch.

== In popular culture ==
The former school campus appeared in the 2008 film Leatherheads starring George Clooney.
