= Simpsonville, South Carolina =

Simpsonville
- City
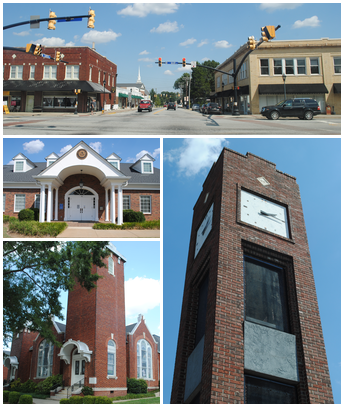
- From top, left to right: Downtown Simpsonville, former Simpsonville City Hall, Simpsonville Baptist Church, Simpsonville Clock Tower

- Seal Logo
- Motto: "Simply Home"
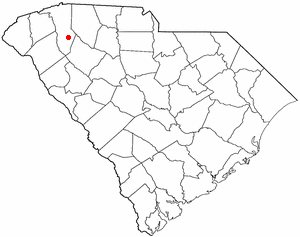
- Location of Simpsonville, South Carolina
- Coordinates: 34°44′32″N 82°15′06″W
- Country: United States
- State: South Carolina
- County: Greenville
- Incorporated: August 13, 1901; 125 years ago

Area
  - City: 9.45 sq mi (24.47 km^{2})
  - Land: 9.42 sq mi (24.41 km^{2})
  - Water: 0.019 sq mi (0.05 km^{2})
- Elevation: 873 ft (266 m)

Population (2020)
  - City: 23,354
  - Density: 2,477.5/sq mi (956.56/km^{2})
  - Urban: 159,506 (US: 227th)
  - Urban density: 1,576/sq mi (608.5/km^{2})
- Time zone: UTC−5 (Eastern (EST))
  - Summer (DST): UTC−4 (EDT)
- ZIP codes: 29680-29681
- Area codes: 864, 821
- FIPS code: 45-66580
- GNIS feature ID: 2405467
- Website: www.simpsonville.com

Simpsonville is a city in Greenville County, South Carolina, United States. It is part of the Greenville, SC Metropolitan Statistical Area. The population is 23,354, according to the 2020 census, up from 18,238 in the 2010 census. The city's 2024 Annual Financial Audit estimates the population to be about 27,500. Independent data site DataCommons estimates the population of Simpsonville to be about 28,078. Simpsonville is part of the "Golden Strip", along with the cities of Mauldin and Fountain Inn, an area which is noted for having low unemployment due to a diversity of industries that include H.B. Fuller, KEMET, Sealed Air and Milliken. The unemployment rate is about 3.1 percent, according to 2023 census estimates. It is the 23rd-most populous city in South Carolina.

== History ==
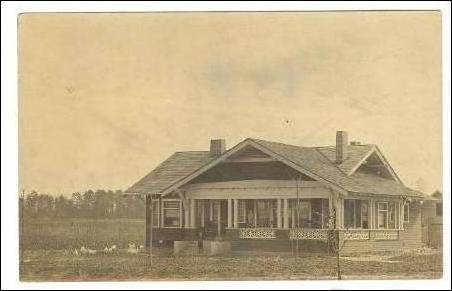
House in Simpsonville, c. 1915

Simpsonville was incorporated on August 13, 1901. The city is named after Peter Simpson, a farmer from Laurens County who provided blacksmithing services and became the local postmaster.

The Burdette Building, Cureton-Huff House, Hopkins Farm, and Simpsonville Baptist Church are listed on the National Register of Historic Places.

The oldest brick building in the city is a former pharmacy built in 1886 at 101 East Curtis Street.

Established in 1901, The Woodside Mill, a textile mill, became Simpsonville's largest employer. The Woodside Mill includes an antique water tower.

The Simpsonville Clock Tower was built in 1987 and is the city's main landmark.

In October 2018, a winning lottery ticket for a $1.6 billion Mega Millions jackpot was sold at the #7 KC Mart in Simpsonville.

== Geography ==
Interactive map of Simpsonville

Simpsonville is located in southeastern Greenville County between Mauldin to the northwest and Fountain Inn to the southeast. The center of town has an elevation of 866 feet (264 m) above sea level.

South Carolina Highway 14 runs through the center of Simpsonville as Main Street, leading north 16 miles (26 km) to Greer and southeast 5 miles (8 km) to the center of Fountain Inn. The center of Mauldin is 4.5 miles (7.2 km) to the northwest via South Carolina Highway 417. Interstate 385 passes through Simpsonville west of the city center, with access from exits 26 through 29. I-385 leads northwest 14 miles (23 km) to the center of Greenville and southeast 28 miles (45 km) to Interstate 26 near Clinton. Columbia, the state capital, is 89 miles (143 km) southeast of Simpsonville.

According to the United States Census Bureau, Simpsonville has a total area of 8.90 square miles (23.05 km^{2}), of which 8.70 square miles (22.53 km^{2}) are land and 0.02 square miles (0.052 km^{2}), or 0.22%, are water.

== Demographics ==
Historical population
Census	Pop.	Note	%±
1900	195		—
1910	521		167.2%
1920	566		8.6%
1930	1,400		147.3%
1940	1,298		−7.3%
1950	1,529		17.8%
1960	2,282		49.2%
1970	3,308		45.0%
1980	9,037		173.2%
1990	11,708		29.6%
2000	14,352		22.6%
2010	18,238		27.1%
2020	23,354		28.1%
2025 (est.)	28,459		21.9%
U.S. Decennial Census; 2020

Simpsonville

Climate chart (precipitation, max. and min. temperature)
J	F	M	A	M	J	J	A	S	O	N	D
3.5 53 33	3 56 35	4.3 65 42	3.5 73 50	3.7 80 58	3.6 88 67	5.4 90 70	4.3 89 69	4.1 82 63	2.9 73 51	3.7 64 41	4.8 55 36
- █ Average max. and min. temperatures in °F
- █ Precipitation totals in inches
Metric conversion
J	F	M	A	M	J	J	A	S	O	N	D
88 12 0	75 13 1	110 18 6	88 23 10	95 27 15	91 31 19	138 32 21	108 31 21	105 28 17	75 23 11	94 18 5	121 13 2
- █ Average max. and min. temperatures in °C
- █ Precipitation totals in mm

=== 2020 census ===
As of the 2020 census, Simpsonville had a population of 23,354. The median age was 39.0 years. 22.8% of residents were under the age of 18 and 16.4% of residents were 65 years of age or older. For every 100 females there were 91.4 males, and for every 100 females age 18 and over there were 88.3 males age 18 and over.

Racial composition as of the 2020 census
Race	Number	Percent
White	15,225	65.2%
Black or African American	4,366	18.7%
American Indian and Alaska Native	77	0.3%
Asian	472	2.0%
Native Hawaiian and Other Pacific Islander	20	0.1%
Some other race	1,114	4.8%
Two or more races	2,080	8.9%
Hispanic or Latino (of any race)	2,496	10.7%

100.0% of residents lived in urban areas, while 0.0% lived in rural areas.

There were 9,235 households in Simpsonville, of which 32.8% had children under the age of 18 living in them. Of all households, 51.3% were married-couple households, 16.1% were households with a male householder and no spouse or partner present, and 26.8% were households with a female householder and no spouse or partner present. About 24.7% of all households were made up of individuals and 8.8% had someone living alone who was 65 years of age or older.

There were 9,772 housing units, of which 5.5% were vacant. The homeowner vacancy rate was 1.4% and the rental vacancy rate was 9.0%.

The median annual income for a household in the city was $71,990, and the per capita income was $32,821. 5.4% of the population were below the poverty line.

== Crime ==
Simpsonville's 2006 crime statistics were higher than national average crime rates. Violent crimes in 2010 totalled 82 for the year. 2006 statistics of violent crime in Simpsonville reflect there was not one murder, reported incidents of rape were slightly higher than the national average (39 per 100,000 in Simpsonville, with a national average of 33 per 100,000), and incidents of aggravated assaults were what tipped the 2006 violent crime scales, tallying in at 75% over the national average. In 2007 the personal crime incidents rate tallied in at 6 per 1000 residents, while the national average was 1.3 per 1000. In September 2007, the FBI reported that the state of South Carolina's violent crime rate was the highest in the nation per capita, although Simpsonville is not mentioned at all in the article. Simpsonville car theft in 2006 was lower than the national average, calling into question claims that Simpsonville had a high rate of car-jackings.

In 2017, Simpsonville was named the safest city in South Carolina, based on FBI Crime Report data gathered by the SafeWise security organization; its ranking as of 2021 is 15th.

== Emergency services ==
The Simpsonville Police Department was founded in 1907 and its first police chief was hired in 1928. Citizen-based programs were added in 2014 that provide opportunities for civilians to work alongside police officers. The current chief of police is Michael D. Hanshaw.

The Simpsonville Fire Department was formed in 1922. Fire protection was supported by annual contract fees until the mid-1980s when a tax system was adopted instead. Protection is provided to citizens within Simpsonville's city limits and some parts of surrounding Greenville County via six fire stations within a district of about 30 square miles (78 km^{2}). The department's current fire chief is Wesley Williams.

== Government ==
Simpsonville is governed by a city council, consisting of a mayor and six council members, one from each city ward. The city also has several boards and commissions to advise the council and complete assigned tasks. The council is elected in November of odd years to staggered four-year terms. The current council includes:

- Mayor: Paul Shewmaker (2nd term ends 12-31-2027)
- Council Ward I: Chad O'Rear (1st term ends 12-31-2027)
- Council Ward II: Aaron Rupe (1st term ends 12-31-2029)
- Council Ward III: Shannon Williams (1st term ends 12-31-2027)
- Council Ward IV: Sherry Roche (2nd term ends 12-31-2029)
- Council Ward V: Tim Pinkerton (1st term ends 12-31-2027)
- Council Ward VI: Jerry Tuso (1st term ends 12-31-2029)

The city council appoints a city administrator, who serves at their pleasure, to work with them in the proper administration of the city's policies and affairs. The council also appoints a city clerk, city treasurer, and city attorney, who serve indefinite terms at the pleasure of the council. The current city officers include:

- City Administrator: Tee Coker (since 2025)
- City Clerk: Ashley Clark
- City Treasurer: Maria Tooley
- City Attorney: Daniel Hughes

== Education ==
Public education in Simpsonville is administered by Greenville County School District. The district operates five schools in Simpsonville. Hillcrest High School, Hillcrest Middle School, Bryson Middle School, Simpsonville Elementary School, and Plain Elementary School.

Abiding Peace Academy is a K2-5 grade school of the Wisconsin Evangelical Lutheran Synod in Simpsonville.

Simpsonville has a public library, a branch of the Greenville County Library System.

== Culture and sports ==
Simpsonville's CCNB Amphitheatre at Heritage Park, named for sponsor Coastal Carolina National Bank, is an outdoor entertainment venue with seating for up to 15,000. It has hosted performers and community events since 2005.

The Simpsonville Arts Center hosts performing arts by Clark Nesbitt's No Dreams Deferred theater company. Renovation of the center was completed in February 2022.

The Women's American Basketball Association established a team based in Simpsonville to begin its first season in July 2021. Home games for the Carolina Upstate Thunder are to be played in Greenville.

== Media ==
The Simpsonville Sentinel is the local area newspaper, published monthly. The news website Patch also has a Simpsonville edition.

Simpsonville is part of the Greenville-Spartanburg-Anderson-Asheville DMA television market. Local television stations include:

Simsponville is part of the Greenville-Spartanburg-Anderson Arbitron Metro radio market. Station WYRD-FM is licensed in and transmits from Simpsonville. Other local radio stations include:

== Notable people ==
- Carson Bolemon, professional baseball pitcher
- Justin Bolli, professional golfer
- Danielle Brooks, actress
- Chandler Catanzaro, American football placekicker
- Lucas Glover, PGA Tour golfer
- Shane Hall, NASCAR driver
- Colby Howard, NASCAR driver
- Tommy Jones, professional bowler
- Jamon Meredith, American football offensive tackle
- Emilio Pagan, professional baseball pitcher
- Stephen Thompson, UFC fighter
- Travelle Wharton, American football offensive tackle

== See also ==
- List of municipalities in South Carolina
