= Hopkins Farm (Simpsonville, South Carolina) =

- U.S. National Register of Historic Places
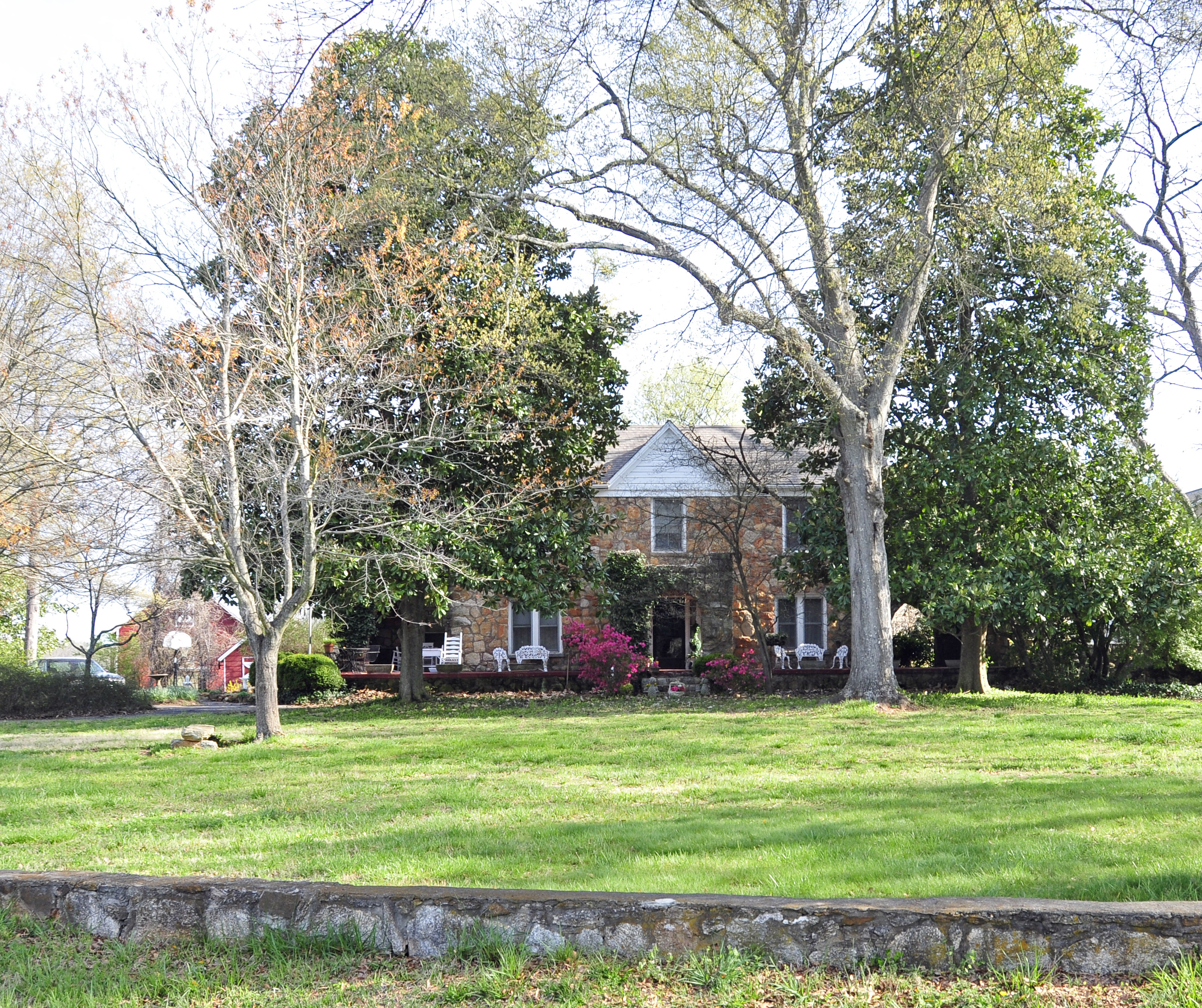
- Hopkins Farm, 2012

- Location within South Carolina Location within the United States
- Location: 3717 Fork Shoals Road
- Nearest city: Simpsonville, South Carolina
- Coordinates: 34.65438°N 82.31552°W
- Area: 340 acres (140 ha)
- Architectural style: Mid 19th Century Revival
- NRHP reference No.: 07000987
- Added to NRHP: September 20, 2007

The Hopkins Farm is an agricultural complex listed on the National Register of Historic Places located near the intersection of South Carolina Highway 418 and Fork Shoals Road in the vicinity of Simpsonville, South Carolina. The complex, begun by John Hopkins who purchased the land in 1834 from James Harrison, consists of the main house, a cook's house, agricultural fields, a pecan grove, eleven outbuildings and a family cemetery.

== Main House ==
The main house is a two-story central hall plan building, built ca1840. A wing was added on to the house ca1890 which included an enclosed porch. A side entry, stone veneer exterior and arcaded entry porches clad in stone were added to the house ca 1925.

== Outbuildings and Structures ==
The buildings and structures that contribute to the historic character of the farm include a ca1850 smoke house on a brick foundation with a dirt floor, a ca1922 small chicken house, a 1924 cotton warehouse with the capacity of 500 bales of cotton, a ca1946 mechanical shed for storage and repair of farm equipment, a ca1946 large chicken house and two ca1950 grain silos. The Hopkins Family Cemetery is the burial ground for an unknown number of slaves as well as members of the Hopkins family.

A double row of pecan trees, known as Patriot's Grove, were planted in 1875, commemorating the centennial anniversary of the American Revolutionary Battle of the Great Cane Break, which occurred on the property that would eventually become the farm.

Buildings and structures which, because of additions or alterations, no longer contribute to the historic nature of the property include the ca1850 Cook's House, a ca1850 corn crib, a ca1875 mule barn, a ca1870 seed house, a ca1890 well house and a ca1985 car shed.

== Present ==
The property is in its seventh generation of ownership by the Hopkins family. A small chicken farm is still located on the farm, along with horticulture gardens and a small number of animals. Portions of the property are available for social events and activities.
