= Troy Pride =

American football player (born 1998)

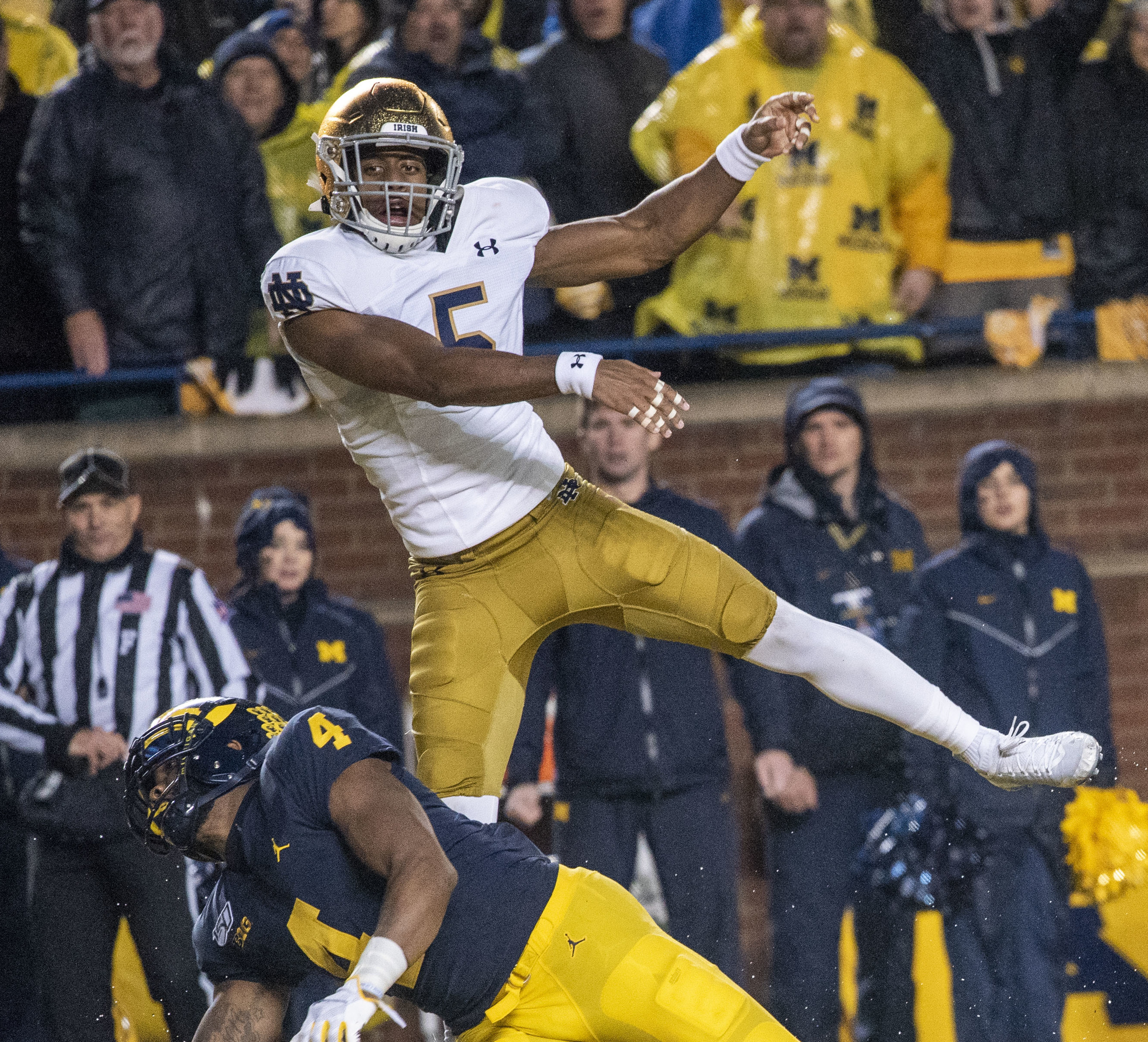
- Pride with the Notre Dame Fighting Irish in 2019

Profile
- Position: Cornerback

Personal information
- Born: January 19, 1998 (age 28); Greer, South Carolina, U.S.
- Listed height: 5 ft 11 in (1.80 m)
- Listed weight: 195 lb (88 kg)

Career information
- High school: Greer
- College: Notre Dame (2016–2019)
- NFL draft: 2020: 4th round, 113th overall pick

Career history
- Carolina Panthers (2020–2021); New Orleans Saints (2023)*; Las Vegas Raiders (2023); Houston Texans (2023–2024)*; Dallas Cowboys (2024); Indianapolis Colts (2025)*
- * Offseason or practice squad member only

Career NFL statistics as of 2025
- Total tackles: 45
- Pass deflections: 3
- Stats at Pro Football Reference

Troy Pride Jr. (born January 19, 1998) is an American professional football cornerback. He played college football for the Notre Dame Fighting Irish and was selected by the Carolina Panthers in the fourth round of the 2020 NFL draft.

== Early life ==
Pride grew up in Greer, South Carolina and attended Greer High School. As a senior, Pride caught 41 passes for 848 yards and 13 touchdowns, rushed for 197 yards and three touchdowns, returned three punts for touchdowns and intercepted three passes on defense with one returned for a touchdown. He originally committed to play college football at Virginia Tech, but de-committed after the retirement of head coach Frank Beamer. He ultimately committed to Notre Dame over offers from North Carolina, Virginia Tech, Ole Miss, Tennessee, and Clemson.

== College career ==
Pride played in eight games with three starts for the Fighting Irish as a true freshman, making 12 tackles with a fumble recovery. As a sophomore, he recorded 22 tackles and one tackle for loss with an interception and two passes broken up. As a junior, Pride made 47 tackles and finished second on the team with 10 passes defended and two interceptions. As a senior, Pride was named All-Independent by Pro Football Focus after making 37 tackles with an interception and five passes defended and holding quarterbacks to a 50.9% completion rate on passes thrown into his coverage. Pride finished his collegiate career with 121 tackles, 18 passes broken up and four interceptions with one forced fumble and two fumbles recovered in 45 games played.

Pride was also a sprinter for the Notre Dame track team. He competed in the 60-meter dash final at the 2018 Atlantic Coast Conference Indoor Track and Field Championship.

== Professional career ==
Pre-draft measurables
Height	Weight	Arm length	Hand span	40-yard dash	10-yard split	20-yard split	20-yard shuttle	Three-cone drill	Vertical jump	Broad jump	Bench press
5 ft 11 1/2 in (1.82 m)	193 lb (88 kg)	30 5/8 in (0.78 m)	9 in (0.23 m)	4.40 s	1.54 s	2.62 s	4.26 s	6.94 s	35.5 in (0.90 m)	9 ft 11 in (3.02 m)	13 reps
All values from NFL Combine

=== Carolina Panthers ===
Pride was selected by the Carolina Panthers in the fourth round with the 113th pick of the 2020 NFL draft. Pride made his NFL debut on September 13, 2020, in the season opener against the Las Vegas Raiders, starting the game and making seven total tackles in a 34–30 loss. On January 2, 2021, Pride was placed on injured reserve. He finished the season with 41 tackles and two pass deflections.

On August 17, 2021, Pride was placed on injured reserve after suffering a knee injury in the preseason.

On May 16, 2022, Pride was waived by the Panthers after failing his physical.

=== New Orleans Saints ===
On January 11, 2023, Pride signed a reserve/future contract with the New Orleans Saints. He was waived on August 29, 2023.

=== Las Vegas Raiders ===
On September 14, 2023, Pride was signed to the practice squad of the Las Vegas Raiders. He was released on December 20.

=== Houston Texans ===
On December 27, 2023, Pride was signed to the practice squad of the Houston Texans. He signed a reserve/future contract on January 22, 2024.

Pride was waived on August 27, 2024, and later re-signed to the practice squad. On October 24, Pride was again released from the practice squad to make room for Rashad Weaver.

=== Dallas Cowboys ===
On December 4, 2024, Pride was signed to the Dallas Cowboys practice squad. He signed a reserve/future contract with Dallas on January 6, 2025. On August 25, Pride was waived by the Cowboys.

=== Indianapolis Colts ===
On October 7, 2025, Pride was signed to the practice squad of the Indianapolis Colts. He was released on November 18. On December 9, Pride was re-signed to the practice squad.

== NFL career statistics ==
Year	Team	Games		Tackles				Fumbles			Interceptions					
Year	Team	GP	GS	Comb	Solo	Ast	Sack	FF	FR	Yds	Int	Yds	Avg	Lng	TD	PD
2020	CAR	14	8	42	27	15	0.0	0	0	0	0	0	0	0	0	2
2023	LV	1	0	0	0	0	0	0	0	0	0	0	0	0	0	0
2024	DAL	2	1	3	2	1	0	0	0	0	0	0	0	0	0	1
Total		17	9	45	29	16	0	0	0	0	0	0	0	0	0	3
