= Dextor Clinkscale =

American football player (born 1958)

No. 47
- Position: Safety

Personal information
- Born: April 13, 1958 (age 68); Greenville, South Carolina, U.S.
- Listed height: 5 ft 11 in (1.80 m)
- Listed weight: 192 lb (87 kg)

Career information
- High school: J. L. Mann (Greenville)
- College: South Carolina State
- NFL draft: 1980: undrafted

Career history
- Dallas Cowboys (1980–1985); Indianapolis Colts (1986)

Awards and highlights
- 3× All-MAC (1977, 1978, 1979); Black College All-American (1979)

Career NFL statistics
- Games played: 76
- Interceptions: 9
- Sacks: 7
- Fumble recoveries: 9
- Touchdowns: 1
- Stats at Pro Football Reference

Frederick Dextor Clinkscale (born April 13, 1958) is an American former professional football player who was a safety in the National Football League (NFL) for the Dallas Cowboys and Indianapolis Colts. He played college football for the South Carolina State Bulldogs.

== Early life ==
Clinkscale attended J. L. Mann High School. As a junior, he missed the football season with a thigh injury. He accepted a football scholarship from South Carolina State University. He played at free safety during his first 3 seasons. As a senior in 1979, he was moved to strong safety and received Black College All-American honors. He also was used as a punt returner.

In 2000, he was inducted into the South Carolina State Athletic Hall of Fame.

== Professional career ==
=== Dallas Cowboys ===
Clinkscale was signed as an undrafted free agent by the Dallas Cowboys after the 1980 NFL draft. As a rookie, he appeared in all 16 games, playing on passing downs to help fill the void left by Cliff Harris' retirement and an injured Randy Hughes. He posted 30 tackles, 2 sacks, 9 passes defensed and one fumble recovery. He had one interception in the playoffs against the Los Angeles Rams.

In 1981, he entered training camp competing with Benny Barnes for the starting strong safety position that was left open with the retirement of Charlie Waters, but missed the entire season due to an Achilles tendon injury he suffered in training camp. He was placed on the injured reserve list on August 31.

In 1982, he played strong safety on passing downs after not being able to pass Barnes on the depth chart. He registered 20 tackles, 2 sacks, one interception, 2 passes defensed and one forced fumble. In the playoffs against the Tampa Bay Buccaneers, he had one interception and 4 passes defensed.

In 1983, he was named the starter at strong safety to replace the retired Barnes, recording 89 tackles (fifth on the team), 4 fumbles recovered (led the team), 2 sacks and 2 interceptions, including one returned for a 68-yard touchdown against the New York Giants in a 28–13 win. In the season opener against the Washington Redskins, he made 12 tackles and one sack. He missed the game against the Seattle Seahawks with an injury.

In 1984, he collected 93 tackles (third on the team), 3 interceptions (third on the team), 2 fumble recoveries (tied for the team lead) and one sack. He produced 8 tackles, one interception and one sack against the Chicago Bears. He missed the game against the Indianapolis Colts with an injury.

In 1985, he registered a career-high 100 tackles (third on the team), 3 interceptions, 2 fumble recoveries and 2 sacks. He had 13 tackles and 2 interceptions against the Atlanta Falcons. That year, he was a part of a secondary that earned the nickname "Thurman's Thieves", because of the amount of big plays and turnovers they generated.

In 1986, he was released 5 games into the season and his position was assigned to Bill Bates, after staging a holdout from the start of training camp. During his six years with the Cowboys, he appeared in 71 games (46 starts).

=== Indianapolis Colts ===
In 1986, Clinkscale was claimed off waivers by the Indianapolis Colts, but he did not agree to a contract and had to be signed as a free agent until October 29. He joined the team in week 9, but did not play against the Cleveland Browns. He appeared in 5 games as a backup, making 12 defensive tackles and 3 special teams tackles. He injured his hamstring in the fourteenth game against the Atlanta Falcons. He was placed on the injured reserve list on December 10. He was waived on July 27, 1987.
