= Simpsonville Clock Tower =

Clock tower in South Carolina, United States

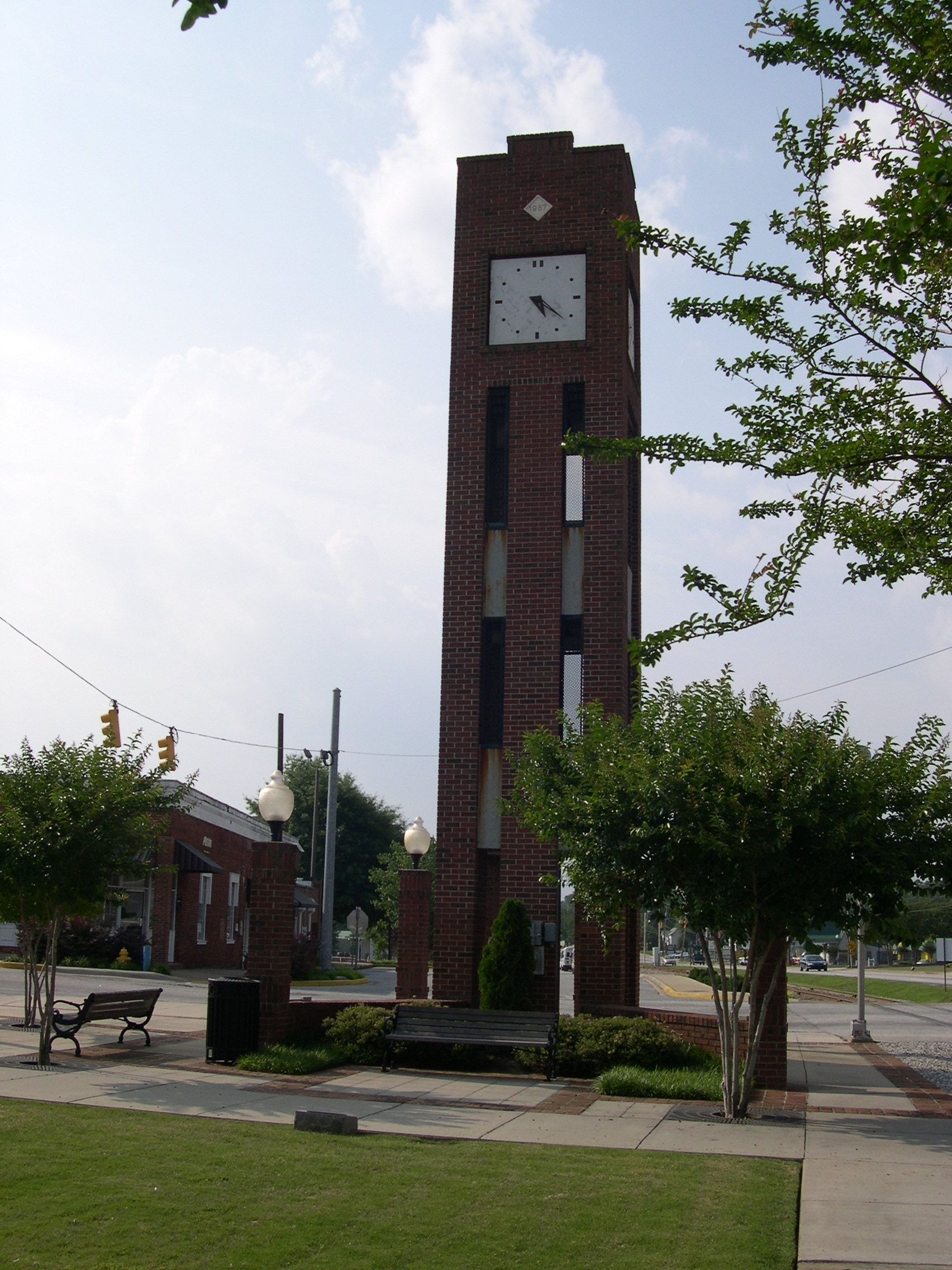
- Simpsonville Clock Tower in 2005
- Location: Simpsonville, South Carolina
- Coordinates: 34°44′14″N 82°15′19″W
- Built: 1987
- Built for: Dedicated to Mayor Ralph S. Hendricks
- Architect: Triad Design Group, Inc.
- Governing body: Greenville County

The Simpsonville Clock Tower is a clock tower in Downtown Simpsonville, South Carolina, United States.

== History ==
The clock tower is a major local landmark, it can be seen on the city's official seal

The Simpsonville Clock Tower was built in 1987 and donated by then-mayor Ralph S. Hendricks. It serves as an icon and main symbol of Simpsonville, South Carolina. It is at the intersection of South Main Street and West Curtis Street, and is part of a bigger space called Hendricks Plaza. It is also located across the street from 101 East Curtis Street and the Burdette Building.

== See also ==
- List of clock towers
