= Benjamin O. Burnett =

American politician (1937–2017)

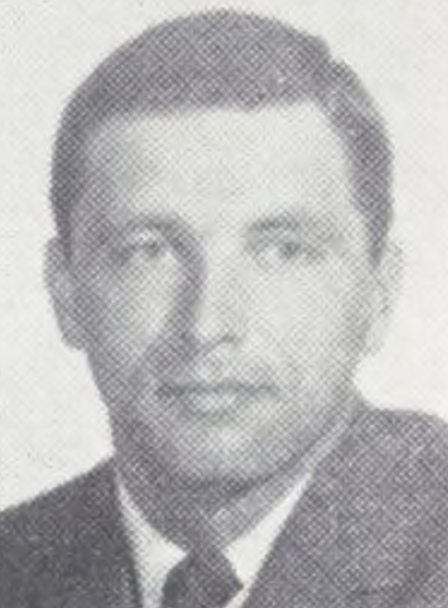
- Burnett in 1969

Member of the South Carolina House of Representatives from Spartanburg County
- In office 1969–1970

Personal details
- Born: Benjamin Oliver Burnett; December 26, 1937 Rock Hill, South Carolina, U.S.
- Died: April 24, 2017 (aged 79) Spartanburg, South Carolina, U.S.
- Party: Democratic
- Education: Newberry College

Benjamin Oliver Burnett (December 26, 1937 – April 24, 2017) was an American politician. A member of the Democratic Party, he served in the South Carolina House of Representatives from 1969 to 1970.

== Life and career ==
Burnett was born in Rock Hill, South Carolina, the son of Claude Oliver Burnett and Vera Edwards. He attended Greer High School, graduating in 1956. After graduating, he attended Newberry College, earning his bachelor's degree in education in 1960, which after earning his degree, he worked as a salesman.

Burnett served in the South Carolina House of Representatives from 1969 to 1970.

== Death ==
Burnett died on April 24, 2017, at the Spartanburg Regional Medical Center in Spartanburg, South Carolina, at the age of 79.
