= Charles V. Pyle Jr. =

American judge and politician

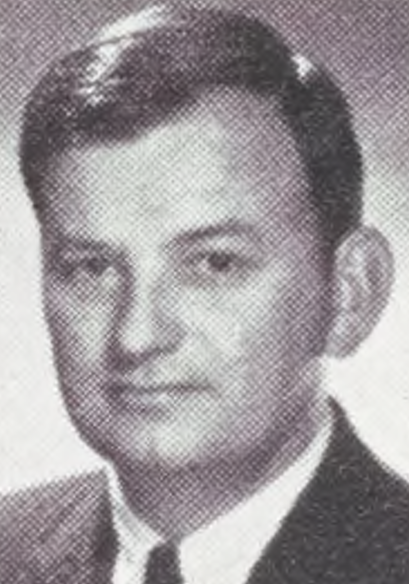
- Pyle in 1969

Member of the South Carolina House of Representatives from Richland County
- In office 1969–1974

Judge of the Thirteenth Judicial Court of South Carolina
- In office 1979–2000

Personal details
- Born: Charles Victor Pyle Jr. December 24, 1934 Greenville, South Carolina, U.S.
- Died: June 2, 2017 (aged 82) Greenville, South Carolina, U.S.
- Party: Democratic
- Spouse(s): Johanna Wright; Suzanne Reynolds
- Children: 3
- Education: University of South Carolina
- Occupation: Judge

Charles Victor Pyle Jr. (December 24, 1934 – June 2, 2017) was an American judge and politician. A member of the Democratic Party, he served in the South Carolina House of Representatives from 1969 to 1974 and as judge of the Thirteenth Judicial Court of South Carolina from 1979 to 2000.

== Life and career ==
Pyle was born in Greenville, South Carolina, the son of Charles Victor Pyle Sr. and Eugenia Smith. He attended Greenville High School, graduating in 1953. After graduating, he attended the University of South Carolina, earning his LLB degree in 1959, which after earning his degree, he worked as a lawyer.

Pyle served in the South Carolina House of Representatives from 1969 to 1974. After his service in the House, he served as judge of the Thirteenth Judicial Court of South Carolina from 1979 to 2000.

== Death ==
Pyle died on June 2, 2017, in Greenville, South Carolina, at the age of 82.
