= Dick Hendley =

American football player (1926–2014)

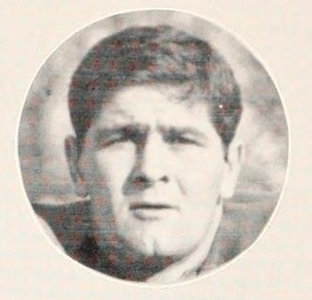
- Hendley at Clemson in 1950

No. 25
- Position: Blocking back

Personal information
- Born: August 6, 1926; Greenville County, South Carolina, U.S.
- Died: October 31, 2014 (aged 88); Greer, South Carolina, U.S.
- Listed height: 6 ft 0 in (1.83 m)
- Listed weight: 198 lb (90 kg)

Career information
- High school: Greenville (SC)
- College: Clemson
- NFL draft: 1951: 22nd round, 262nd overall pick

Career history
- Pittsburgh Steelers (1951)
- Stats at Pro Football Reference

Dickson Lafayette Hendley (August 6, 1926 – October 31, 2014) was an American football blocking back who played for the Pittsburgh Steelers. He played college football at Clemson University, having previously attended Greenville High School. Hendley's grandson is professional golfer Lucas Glover.
