= Greenville County School District =

School district in South Carolina, United States

Location
- 301 E. Camperdown Way, Greenville, South Carolina United States

District information
- Grades: PreK–12
- Established: August 23, 1951
- Superintendent: Dr. W. Burke Royster
- Deputy superintendent(s): Dr. Scott Turner
- Schools: 106
- Budget: $1,074.030 million (2022–23)
- NCES District ID: 4502310

Students and staff
- Students: 77,774 (2024–25)
- Teachers: 5,122.53 (on an FTE basis)
- Staff: 5,714.40 (on an FTE basis)
- Student–teacher ratio: 15.18

Other information
- Website: www.greenville.k12.sc.us

Greenville County School District (GCSD) is a public school district in Greenville County, South Carolina, United States. It is the largest school district in the state of South Carolina and, in 2021, the 44th largest in the US. As of the 2019–2020 school year, the district, led by Superintendent Dr. W Burke Royster, served 76,964 students from Greenville; and some parts of Laurens and Spartanburg counties. Spread across 106 education centers, the district, in 2018, employed 4,908 certified teachers. GCSD had an operating budget of $592.639 million for the 2017–2018 school year. GCSD has 14 National Blue Ribbon Schools, 9 Newsweek's Best High Schools, 21 Carolina First Palmetto's Finest Schools, 48 Red Carpet Schools, and 29 National PTA Schools of Excellence.

The district includes the majority of Greenville County, though small portions are in other school districts. It also extends into a portion of Laurens County, where it includes that county's part of Fountain Inn. The district also extends into Spartanburg County, where it includes portions of Greer in that county.

== History ==
=== Early history ===
At the end of World War II, Greenville County had 86 school districts. The smallest was a one-room school; the two largest, Parker and Greenville City, served two-thirds of the student population.

On August 23, 1951 the Greenville County Board of Education, chaired by J. B. League, established the School District of Greenville County and appointed nine trustees, with A. D. Asbury as chair. Dr. William F. Loggins was the first superintendent. An educational program of greater equality began to emerge, mainly by consolidating smaller schools.

=== Public schools desegregation ===
In 1963, the local NAACP filed suit in the federal district court, for the children of A. J. Whittenberg and five other Black students to attend all-white schools. They were represented by Willie Smith and Matthew Perry, while the district was represented by its attorney E. P. (Ted) Riley. On April 14, after a federal judge gave the school board thirty days to reconsider, Superintendent Marion T. Anderson announced that fifty-five black students would be transferred to sixteen white schools in 1964.

Integration did not go smoothly and in May 1968 the state supreme court declared freedom of choice plans unacceptable. Opposition organizations were formed including Citizens for Freedom of Choice, Citizens to Prevent Busing, and Concerned Black Parents, chaired by H. L. Sullivan. In February 1970, most all-black schools were closed. 60% of the black and 10% of the white students were reassigned. 75% of the busing involved black students.

== Educational structure ==
GCSD students attend schools based primarily on the geographic location of their homes. Schools of a lower level 'feed into' a certain school of the next highest level, meaning that students leaving the lower level schools attend the higher level school. Exceptions to the feeder system are students wishing to enroll in the magnet schools programs offered in 12 schools, or those who participate in the International Baccalaureate, which is offered in its three levels at four clusters over the county. Parents of students may also request transfers out of their students' assigned schools for various reasons (such as to take classes unique to a particular school).

== In the news ==
- In 2005, six Greenville County elementary schools and two middle schools were identified in a study released by the South Carolina Education Oversight Committee (EOC) as reducing the achievement gap for at least one historically underachieving student group.
- Tanglewood Middle School shooting

== Schools ==
=== Elementary schools ===
The Greenville County School District has 51 elementary schools that serve its population of 75,000 students. Most of the schools serve grades kindergarten through 5th grade, however two schools, the Rudolph Gordon School and Sterling School Charles Townes Center for the Highly Gifted and Talented, serve kindergarten though 6th and kindergarten though 8th, respectively.

Name	Grades	Enrollment	Principal	Address
A.J. Wittenberg Elementary	K4-5th	487	Cameron Brice	420 Westfield Street Greenville, SC 29601
Alexander Elementary	K4-5th	492	Dawn Hooker	1601 Bramlett Road Greenville, SC 29611
Armstrong Elementary	K4-5th	434	Jacqueline Harris-Solomon	8601 White Horse Rd. Greenville, SC 29617
Augusta Circle Elementary	K5-5th	605	Mimi Melehes	100 Winyah Street Greenville 29605
Bell's Crossing Elementary	K5-5th	881	Paul Crook	804 Scuffletown Road Simpsonville, SC 29681
Berea Elementary	K5-5th	489	Hunter McClure	100 Berea Dr. Greenville, SC 29617
Bethel Elementary	K5-5th	914	Nurit' Sexton	111 Bethel School Rd Simpsonville, SC 29681
Blythe Academy	K4-5th	861	Steven Sokohl	100 Blythe Drive Greenville, SC 29605
Brook Glenn Elementary	K4-5th	428	Jordan O'Toole	2003 East Lee Rd. Taylors, SC 29687
Brushy Creek Elementary	K4-5th	812	Charles T. Davis Jr.	1344 Brushy Creek Rd. Taylors, SC 29687
Bryson Elementary	K5-5th	1052	Andreya Boggs	703 Bryson Dr. Simpsonville, SC 29681
Buena Vista Elementary	K5-5th	834	David Burgess	310 Batesville Rd. Greer, SC 29650
Chandler Creek Elementary	K4-5th	875	Cassandra Davis	301 Chandler Rd Greer, SC 29651
Cherrydale Elementary	K4-5th	634	Debra R. Johnson	302 Perry Rd. Greenville, SC 29609
Crestview Elementary	K4-5th	704	David Langston	509 American Legion Road Greer, SC 29651
Duncan Chapel Elementary	K5-5th	619	Danielle Lee	210 Duncan Chapel Rd. Greenville, SC 29617
East North Street Academy	K4-5th	674	Dr. Jordan Hudson	1720 E. North St. Greenville, SC 29607
Ellen Woodside Elementary	K4-5th	1067	Shawn McCain	9122 Augusta Rd. Pelzer, SC 29669
Fork Shoals	K5-5th	752	Kim Reid	916 McKelvey Rd. Pelzer, SC 29669
Fountain Inn Elementary	K3-5th	1039	Jessica Preisig	608 Fairview St. Fountain Inn, SC 29644
Gateway Elementary	K4-5th	657	Jake Gambrell	200 Hawkins Rd. Travelers Rest, SC 29690
Greenbrier Elementary	K4-5th	875	Le'Keisha Brown	853 Log Shoals Rd. Greenville, SC 29607
Grove Elementary	K5-5th	619	Stephanie Reese	1220 Old Grove Rd. Piedmont, SC 29673
Heritage Elementary	K4-5th	547	Heather Hester	1592 Geer Highway Travelers Rest, SC 29690
Hollis Academy	K4-5th	570	Sofia Tsambounieris	200 Goodrich Street Greenville, SC 29611
Lake Forest Elementary	K4-5th	822	Julie Cooke	16 Berkshire Avenue Greenville, SC 29615
Mauldin Elementary	K4-5th	1048	Jennifer Dodds	1194 Holland Road,, Simpsonville, SC 29681
Mitchell Road Elementary	K4-5th	569	Morgan Warner	4124 E. North St. Ext. Greenville, SC 29615
Monarch Elementary	K4-5th	874	Mark Loach	224 Five Forks Road Simpsonville, SC 29681
Monaview Elementary	K4-5th	590	Stephen Hampton	10 Monaview St. Greenville, SC 29617
Mountain View Elementary	K4-5th	815	Jennifer Gibson	6350 Mountain View Road Taylors, SC 29687
Oakview Elementary	K5-5th	887	Dr. Phillip Reavis	515 Godfrey Rd. Simpsonville, SC 29681
Paris Elementary	K5-5th	596	Lakisha Cook	32 East Belvue Road Taylors, SC 29687
Pelham Road Elementary	K5-5th	762	Kristy Qualls	100 All Star Way Greenville, SC 29615
Plain Elementary	K5-5th	974	Deborah Mihalic	506 Neely Ferry Road Simpsonville, SC 29680
Reedy Laurel Elementary	K4-5th		Matt Critell	51 Isbell Lane Greenville, SC 29607
Robert E. Cashion Elementary	K4-5th	968	Ryan Streetman	1500 Fork Shoals Road Greenville, SC 29605
Rudolph Gordon School	K5-6th	1643	Meredith Welch	1507 Scuffletown Road Simpsonville, SC 29681
Sara Collins Elementary	K5-5th	913	Dr. Melissa Burns	1200 Parkins Mill Road Greenville, SC 29607
Simpsonville Elementary	K5-5th	798	Holly Rollison	200 Morton Avenue Simpsonville, SC 29681
Skyland Elementary	K4-5th	761	Leah Stafford	4221 Hwy. 14 North Greer, SC 29651
Slater Marietta Elementary	K4-5th	310	Candice Stanton	100 Baker Circle Marietta, SC 29661
Sterling School Charles Townes Gifted Center	K3-8th	753	Dr. Josh Patterson	99 John McCarroll Way Greenville, SC 29607
Stone Academy	K5-5th	536	Suzanne Shouse	115 Randall St Greenville, SC 29609
Sue Cleveland Elementary	K5-5th	546	Jenni Dunagan	375 Woodmont School Rd Piedmont, SC 29673
Summit Drive Elementary	K5-5th	581	Jennifer Woody	424 Summit Dr Greenville, SC 29609
Taylors Elementary	K5-5th	730	Heather Dye	809 Reid School Rd. Taylors, SC 29687
Thomas E. Kerns Elementary	K5-5th	550	Ronda Simmons	6650 Frontage at White Horse Rd Greenville, SC 29605-3300
Tigerville Elementary	K4-5th	270	Amy Kern	25 Tigerville Elem. School Rd. Taylors, SC 29687
Welcome Elementary	K5-5th	633	Dr. Wallace Cobbs	36 E. Welcome Rd Greenville, SC 29611
Westcliffe Elementary	K4-5th	283	Beth Farmer	105 Eastbourne Rd. Greenville, SC 29611
Woodland Elementary	K5-5th	1290	Katrina Miller	1730 Gibb Shoals Road, Greer, SC 29650

=== Middle schools ===
Name	Grades	Enrollment	Principal	Address
Beck International Academy	6-8th	847	Dr. Donald Jones	901 Woodruff Road Greenville, SC 29607
Berea Middle	6-8th	763	Brianna Falvey	151 Berea Middle School Rd Greenville, SC 29617
Blue Ridge Middle	6-8th	914	Sandy Taylor	2423 E. Tyger Bridge Rd. Greer, SC 29651
Bryson Middle	6-8th	983	Caroline Bohnenberger	3657 South Industrial Dr. Simpsonville, SC 29681
Dr. Phinnize J. Fisher Middle	6-8th	930	Jeremie Smith	700 Millennium Blvd Greenville, SC 29607
Greenville Middle Academy	6-8th	739	Edgar Henson	339 Lowndes Avenue Greenville, SC 29607
Greer Middle	6-8th	1037	Stephanie Lackey	3032 E. Gap Creek Rd. Greer, SC 29651
Hillcrest Middle	6-8th	994	William Price	510 Garrison Rd. Simpsonville, SC 29681
Hughes Academy	6-8th	997	Adrian Mayes	122 DeOyley Ave. Greenville, SC 29605
Lakeview Middle	6-8th	730	J. Towers Rice	3801 Old Buncombe Road Greenville, SC 29617
League Academy of Communication Arts	6-8th	788	Dana Swartzel	125 Twin Lake Dr. Greenville, SC 29609
Mauldin Middle	6-8th	919	Karen Greene	1190 Holland Rd. Simpsonville, SC 29681
Northwest Middle	6-8th	790	Daniel Greene	1606 Geer Hwy. Travelers Rest, SC 29690
Northwood Middle	6-8th	825	Brook Patterson	710 Ike's Rd. Taylors, SC 29687
Ralph Chandler Middle	6-8th	765	Brandon Addy	4231 Fork Shoals Road Simpsonville, SC 29680
Riverside Middle	6-8th	1090	Matt Keith	615 Hammett Bridge Rd. Greer, SC 29650
Sevier Middle	6-8th	648	Dr. Graysen Walles	1000 Piedmont Park Road Greenville, SC 29609
Tanglewood Middle	6-8th	651	Leroy Platt	44 Merriwoods Dr. Greenville, SC 29611
Woodmont Middle	6-8th	901	Kyle Pearson	325 North Flat Rock Road Piedmont, SC 29673

=== High schools ===
Name	Grades	Enrollment	Principal	Address
Berea High	9-12th	1275	Mike Noel	201 Burdine Drive Greenville, SC 29617
Blue Ridge High	9-12th	1071	Ashley Wardlaw	2151 Fews Chapel Rd. Greer, SC 29651
Carolina High School & Academy	9-12th	980	Jeremy Carrick	2725 Anderson Rd. Greenville, SC 29611
Eastside High	9-12th	1505	Todd Stafford	1300 Brushy Creek Rd. Taylors, SC 29687
Fountain Inn High	9-12th	1608	Stephanie Smith	644 Quillen Avenue Fountain Inn, SC 29644
Greenville Senior High School	9-12th	1735	Dylan Hudson	1 Vardry St. Greenville, SC 29601
Greer High	9-12th	1427	Andrew Baker	3000 East Gap Creek Dr. Greer, SC 29651
Hillcrest High	9-12th	1920	April Reece	3665 S. Industrial Dr. Simpsonville, SC 29681
J.L. Mann Academy	9-12th	2019	Barry Ledford	160 Fairforest Way Greenville, SC 29607
Mauldin High	9-12th	2119	Mike Peake	701 E. Butler Rd. Mauldin, SC 29662
Riverside High	9-12th	1839	Darah Huffman	794 Hammett Bridge Road Greer, SC 29650
Southside High	9-12th	1087	Tatiana Shea	6630 Frontage at White Horse Rd Greenville, SC 29605-3300
Travelers Rest High	9-12th	1296	Michelle Michael	301 North Main St. Travelers Rest, SC 29690
Wade Hampton High	9-12th	1788	Justin Ludley	100 Pine Knoll Dr. Greenville, SC 29609
Woodmont High	9-12th	2184	Melissa Patterson	2831 West Georgia Road Piedmont, SC 29673

=== Career Centers ===
The Greenville County School District offers four career centers to its students. Students in grades 9-12 can take elective classes at these schools in conjunction with their regular studies at the assigned high schools. Students completing courses at these career centers will be awarded with certain industry certificates.

Name	Type	Administrator	Address
Donaldson Career Center	Vocational Center	Leland Blankenship	100 Vocational Dr. Greenville, SC 29605
Enoree Career Center	Vocational Center	Greg Cooke	108 Scalybark Rd. Greenville, SC 29617
Golden Strip Career Technology Center	Vocational Center	Treva Lee	1120 East Butler Rd. Greenville, SC 29607
J. Harley Bonds Career Center	Vocational Center	Kelly Sanderson	505 North Main St. Greer, SC 29650
CTE Innovation Center	Career and Technology Education and Vocational Center	Katie Porter	402 Roper Mountain Rd Greenville, SC 29615

=== Special Focus Centers ===
Name	Type	Administrator	Address
Fine Arts Center	Fine Arts Education 9-12th	Vee Popat	102 Pine Knoll Drive Greenville, SC 29609
Roper Mountain Science Center	Public Science Center/Museum	Michael Weeks	402 Roper Mountain Rd. Greenville, SC 29615
Washington Center	Special Education ages 3–21	Teisha Hair	2 Betty Spencer Drive Greenville, SC 29607
West Greenville School	School for students with significant Emotional and Behavioral Disorders (EBD) 6-12th	Dr. Tim Spicio	15 Endel St. Greenville, SC 29611
CTE Innovation Center	Career and Technology Education and Vocational Center	Katie Porter	402 Roper Mountain Rd Greenville, SC 29615

== Administration ==
=== Board of Trustees ===
- Amanda Brett, Area 26
- Debi C. Bush, Chair, Area 19
- Jeff Cochran, Area 28
- Sarah Dulin, Area 27
- Michelle Goodwin-Calwile, Area 25
- Lynda Leventis-Wells, Area 22
- Ann Marie Middleton, Area 18
- Glenda Morrison-Fair, Secretary pro tempore, Area 23
- Angie Mosley, Area 21
- Anne Pressley, Area 24
- Charles J. (Chuck) Saylors, Area 20
- Carolyn J. Styles, Vice-Chair pro tempore, Area 17

=== District Administration ===
- Dr. W. Burke Royster, Superintendent
  - Doug Webb, General Counsel
  - Whitney Hanna, Executive Director of Strategic Communications and Engagement
  - Julie Horton, Director of Governmental Relations
  - Karen Kapp, Director of Staff and Leadership Development
  - Nancy Fitzer, Assistant to the Superintendent and Board Liaison
  - Dr. Raashad Fitzpatrick, Assistant to the Superintendent and District Ombudsman
  - Katherine Malone, Assistant to the Superintendent and District Ombudsman
- Dr. Scott Turner, Deputy Superintendent
- Jeff McCoy, Associate Superintendent for Academics
  - Dr. Charlotte McDavid, Executive Director for Academic Innovation and Technology
  - Dr. Jason McCreary, Director of Accountability and Quality Assurance
  - Eric Williams, Executive Director - College and Career Readiness
  - Tara Dean, Director of Special Academic Projects
  - Traci Hogan, Assistant Superintendent for Special Education Services
- Dr. Megan Mitchell-Hoefer, Assistant Superintendent for School Leadership - Elementary Schools Group 1
- Brenda Byrd, Assistant Superintendent for School Leadership - Elementary Schools Group 2
- Nerissa Lewis, Assistant Superintendent for School Leadership - Elementary Schools Group 3
- Dr. David McDonald, Assistant Superintendent for School Leadership - Middle Schools
- Scott Rhymer, Assistant Superintendent for School Leadership - High Schools
- Dr. George Ward, Associate Superintendent for Operations
  - Darryl Nance, Director of Athletics
  - Scott Carlin, Executive Director of Facilities
  - Bill Brown, Executive Director of Education Technology Services
  - Greg Stanfield, Executive Director of Planning and Demographics
  - Dr. Bryan Skipper, Executive Director of Student Personnel Services
  - Adam James, Director of Transportation
- Robin Stack, Chief Finance Officer
- Morgan Clements, Chief Human Resources Officer

== See also ==
- List of school districts in South Carolina
- Bill Workman, former school board member

== Notes ==
1. Greenville, A. V. Huff Jr., Conclusion: The Emergence of Modern Greenville
2. Magnet
3. IB
4. Achievement gap EOC
