= J. L. Mann High School =

J.L. Mann High School

Location
- 160 Fairforest Way; Greenville, South Carolina 29607; United States; 34°48′27″N 82°20′14″W

Information
- Type: Public
- Established: July 1, 1965 (61 years ago)
- School district: Greenville County School District
- Principal: Shannon Gibson
- Faculty: 130
- Teaching staff: 113.00 (FTE)
- Grades: 9–12
- Enrollment: 1,950 (2026-2027)
- Student to teacher ratio: 18.25
- Colors: Carolina Blue, Patriot Red, and Summit White
- Mascot: The Patriot
- Rivals: Greenville High School
- Newspaper: Mannuscript
- Yearbook: Talismann
- Website: www.greenville.k12.sc.us/jlmann

J. L. Mann High School a high school in the Greenville County School District, South Carolina, United States. It is named after James Lewis Mann (1872–1943), former superintendent of Greenville County Schools. J.L. Mann is also a magnet school for math, science, and technology, allowing students to receive honorary distinction in one of the three areas when they graduate.

== Facilities ==
J. L. Mann High School opened on July 1, 1965, in the East Parkins Mill Road area of Greenville. On January 5, 2008, students and faculty moved into a new building, which replaced the original high school constructed in 1964. The J. L. Mann football stadium is located next to the old high school, about one mile from the new building.

As of the 2017–2018 school year, the campus comprises two separate facilities: "Building A", the new building completed in 2008; and "Building B", an addition completed in fall of 2017. Building B, intended for tech-integrated project-based learning (including the New Tech program), sports a more modern interior design, and is only accessible to students and visitors via an elevated "sky bridge" connecting it to the second floor of Building A. The addition of Building B was accompanied by a new running track and tennis court.

== Feeder Schools ==
The primary feeder middle schools of J.L. Mann High School are Dr. Phinnize J. Fisher Middle School and Greenville Middle Academy. The primary feeder elementary schools are Sara Collins Elementary School and Reedy Laurel Elementary School.

== Non-core Subject Courses ==
In addition to the four traditional core-subject subjects (English, Math, Social Studies, and Science), J.L. Mann High offers various classes in World Language, Fine Arts, Physical Education, and Career and Technical Education.

=== World Languages ===
J.L. Mann High School offers two languages in its World Language Department for students to study. Spanish and French.

=== Fine Arts ===
Fine Arts classes at J.L. Mann High School include theatre, orchestra, art, crafts, ceramics, chorus, and band.

=== Career and Technical Education ===
Career and Technical Education classes and/or pathways offered at J.L. Mann High School include Health Science, Engineering, Aerospace Engineering, Computer Science, Web Design, Advertising, Business, and Marketing.

=== Army JROTC ===
Army JROTC is offered at J.L. Mann High to prepare students who are interested in joining the Army, or another branch of the military and to serve their communities.

=== Physical Education ===
In addition to Physical Education 1, which is a required course to be taken in South Carolina. The Physical Education department at J.L. Mann High School also offers weightlifting classes.

== Principals ==
As of the 2010–2011 school year, J.L. Mann High School has had 10 principals.

- Larkin Bruce
- Ronald Siefred
- Milton Diehl
- Rudolph Gordon
- Bill Stubbs
- David Vickery: 1984–1989
- Fred Crawford: 1989–2000
- Leroy Elrod: 2000–2001
- Susan Hughes: 2001–2009
- Charles Mayfield: 2009–2022
- Shannon Gibson: 2022–2026
- Barry Ledford: 2026-Present

== Athletics ==
The sports that J.L. Mann High School offers are listed below:

Sports offered at J.L. Mann High School
Boys	Girls
Cross Country	Competitive Cheer
Football	Cross Country
Swimming	Flag Football
Volleyball	Golf
Basketball	Swimming
Wrestling	Tennis
Baseball	Volleyball
Golf	Basketball
Lacrosse	Lacrosse
Soccer	Soccer
Tennis	Softball
Track and Field	Track and Field

Their mascot is the Patriot.

== Student Clubs and Organizations ==
Student Clubs and Organizations at J.L. Mann High School include an American Sign Language (ASL) Club, Anchor Club, Animal Advocacy Club, Art Club, Best Buddies, Beta Club, Chemistry Club, Chess Club, DECA, Environmental Club, Fellowship of Christian Athletes (FCA), French Club, Future Business Leaders of America (FBLA), Fencing Club, HOSA, Drama Club/International Thespian Society, Key Club, National Art Honor Society, National Honor Society, National Speech and Debate, National Technical Honor Society, Red Cross Club, Robotics Club, Student Council and Student Government, and Youth in Government.

== Mannuscript ==
J.L. Mann's student newspaper has won many awards including Best SC Scholastic Newspaper by the South Carolina Scholastic Press Association in 2013. Under adviser Phillip Caston from 2006 to 2013, Mannuscript received the Palmetto Award six times for best in its class from SCSPA as well as six All-State ratings. Mannuscript also received All-Southern ratings in 2012 and 2013 from the Southern Interscholastic Press Association. In 2012, SIPA awarded the Mannuscript staff the Joseph W. Shoquist Freedom of the Press Award for their special issue coverage of a controversy involving Spirit Week funds and an after-school bus program despite unsuccessful attempts of censorship by the J.L. Mann administration.

== Notable alumni ==
- Dextor Clinkscale (1976) - former NFL player
- Emilio Pagan (2009) - baseball player for the Cincinnati Reds, represents Puerto Rico internationally
- Quinn McNeill (2017) soccer player who played for Charlotte FC
- Caroline Conti (2019) - soccer player for Bay FC
