= Blue Ridge High School (South Carolina) =

Location
- 2151 Fews Chapel Road; Greer, South Carolina 29651; United States; 35°2′24″N 82°17′12″W

Information
- School type: Public high school
- Motto: One Community... Mountains of Success
- Established: 1954 (72 years ago)
- School district: Greenville County Schools
- Principal: Ashley Wardlaw
- Teaching staff: 57
- Grades: 9–12
- Enrollment: 995 (2026-27)
- Student to teacher ratio: 17.86
- Colors: Red, black and white
- Team name: Fighting Tigers
- Yearbook: El Dorado
- Website: www.greenville.k12.sc.us/bridgehs/

Blue Ridge High School is a high school situated between Greer, South Carolina and Taylors, South Carolina, United States. It is under the jurisdiction of Greenville County School District.

== Enrollment and Demographics ==
In the 2023–2024 school year, Blue Ridge had 1,075 students and 60 teachers. Of those students, 83% were White, 9% were Hispanic, and 5% African-American. Blue Ridge High is served by the USDA's Community Eligibility Provision which allows schools to provide free lunch to students. It is one of 82 schools in Greenville County Schools served by the program. Without this program, 41% of the school population would be eligible for free lunch and 4% would be eligible for reduced lunch. The student to teacher ratio is 18:1, which is higher than the state average of 14:1.

== History ==
Blue Ridge High School opened in 1954, as a consolidation of Jordan and Mountain View High Schools. The population of the area grew as the region changed from its rural, agrarian origins to a rapidly growing area and a new school site was purchased in 1971; however, the new high school did not open until 1986. The original site of Blue Ridge High School is now the site of Blue Ridge Middle School. Over the next twenty-four years, the community continued to grow and the facility was becoming inadequate. In 2003, Greenville County initiated a program to update its school facilities. Blue Ridge was scheduled for a remodel, and received a newly remodeled building in January 2006.

== Facilities ==
Blue Ridge High School is situated on a 50 acre area at Fews Chapel Road and Pennington Road in Greer, SC. Blue Ridge High School's current building opened its doors in 1986 and was renovated in 2006 following a district-wide initiative to update its school facilities. The current building features practice gyms, Promethean boards in every classroom, and spacious science labs. The school's grounds also include an agriculture shop, greenhouse, Coach Jim Howard Stadium, a lighted football stadium, a lighted baseball stadium, and a lighted softball field.

== Feeder Schools ==
Blue Ridge High School has 1 primary feeder Middle School, Blue Ridge Middle School, and 3 primary feeder Elementary Schools, Skyland Elementary School in Greer, Mountain View Elementary School in Taylors, and Tigersville Elementary School in Taylors.

== Curriculum ==
=== Core Subjects ===
==== English ====
In South Carolina, 4 English courses are required to be taken to graduate High School. Students are required to take English 2 and the English 2 EOCEP. Blue Ridge High offers many English courses including English 1 CP and Honors, English 2 CP and Honors, English 3 CP and Honors, English 4 CP, AP English Language and Composition, and AP English Literature and Composition. These courses count towards graduation requirements. The English department also includes courses in Creative Writing, Journalism, Broadcast Journalism, and Yearbook Production.

==== Mathematics ====
In South Carolina, 4 Math courses are required to be taken to graduate High School. Students are required to take Algebra 1 and the Algebra 1 EOCEP. Mathematics courses offered at Blue Ridge include Algebra 1 CP and honors, Geometry CP and Honors, Pre-Calculus CP and Honors, Statistical Modeling, AP Calculus AB, AP Calculus BC, and AP Statistics.

==== Science ====
In South Carolina, 3 Science courses are required to be taken to graduate High School. Biology 1 is required to be taken, as well as the Biology 1 EOCEP. Science courses at Blue Ridge High School are Integrated Science, an introductory course for 9th grade students who need additional support for the literacy demands of Biology, Biology 1 CP and Honors, Chemistry 1 CP and Honors, Chemistry 2 Honors, Environmental Studies CP, Anatomy CP, Physics 1 H, Marine Science, Astronomy, and AP Chemistry. At Blue Ridge High, Chemistry 2 Honors and AP Chemistry must be taken consecutively

==== Social Studies ====
In South Carolina, 3 Social Studies courses are required to be taken. This includes a half-credit of Government and Economics each, a credit of US History, and the US History EOCEP. The Social Studies department at Blue Ridge High includes a wide variety of classes such as Human Geography CP and Honors, AP Human Geography, Modern World History CP and Honors, AP European History, Civics, Law Education, Sociology, Psychology CP, US History and Constitution CP and Honors, AP US History Preparation Lab, AP US History, Economics and Personal Finance CP and Honors, US Government CP and Honors, AP US Government, and AP Macroeconomics. Economics and Personal Finance CP and Honors classes must be taken with their US Government CP and Honors equivalents due to them being paired graduation requirement classes. Similarly, their AP equivalents, AP US Government and AP Macroeconomics must be taken together. AP US History Preparation Lab and AP US History must be taken consecutively.

=== Other Graduation Requirement Classes ===
==== Health ====
As a graduation requirement in South Carolina, students at every High School must complete a class that includes physical activity and a health class. At Blue Ridge High School, this requirement is fulfilled by Physical Education 1 or AFJROTC 1, the first class offered in Blue Ridge High School's Air Force JROTC program.

==== Computer Science ====
In South Carolina, 1 credit of Computer Science is a graduation requirement. This can be attained through the completion of Fundamentals of Web Design or Advanced Fundamentals of Web Design at Blue Ridge High. Students can also take IT Fundamentals or AP Computer Science Principles online to fulfill this requirement.

==== Foreign Language or Occupational Specialty ====
A foreign language or occupational specialty credit is required to graduate in South Carolina. Foreign Language classes that can be taken to receive this credit at Any class in the Career and Technological Education Department at Blue Ridge High school counts as an occupational specialty credit.

=== Career and Technology Classes ===
Career Technology classes at Blue Ridge High fulfill the World Language or Occupational Specialty requirement for Graduation and are meant to introduce and prepare students to enter certain fields in the workforce. Many of these are grouped into pathways.

==== Accounting ====
Accounting classes are offered at Blue Ridge High to introduce and prepare students to work in the field of accounting and business. These classes include Accounting 1 and Accounting 2.

==== Web Design ====
Two web design courses are offered at Blue Ridge High. Fundamentals of Web Design and Advanced Fundamentals of Web Design.

==== Personal Finance ====
Two personal finance courses are offered at Blue Ridge High. Personal Finance is a graduation requirement. These two classes are Personal Finance and Advanced Personal Finance.

==== Health Science ====
Blue Ridge High offers Health Science classes to introduce students to work in health care. These classes include Health Science 1, 2, 3 Honors, and Medical Terminology Honors.

==== Agriculture ====
The Agriculture program at Blue Ridge High introduces students to the world of agriculture, horticulture, and small animal caretaking. Classes in the Agriculture program include Agriculture Science Technology, Agriculture Mechanics and Technology, Intro to Horticulture 1, Nursery/Garden Center 1, and Small Animal Care 1. The Agriculture programs use a greenhouse built at the school in 2012.

==== Family and Consumer Sciences ====
Blue Ridge High offers a variety of family and consumer sciences classes. These classes include Family/Consumer Science, Child Development 1 and 2, Food and Nutrition 1, and Fashion Design and Apparel Construction 1.

==== Engineering ====
Blue Ridge High School offers two Project Lead the Way (PLTW) classes for students to introduce them to engineering and leadership skills needed for the engineering field. These classes are PLTW Principles of Engineering Honors and PLTW Intro to Engineering Design Honors.

==== Future Teacher Academy ====
Through a partnership with Clemson University, all High Schools in Greenville County Schools participate in the Greenville County Schools Future Teacher Academy. This program includes 5 classes. World of Education Honors, ED1400, ED1500, ED2400, ED2500. Blue Ridge High offers two of these, ED1400 and ED2400.

==== Air Force JROTC ====
Blue Ridge High's Air Force JROTC produces cadets and leaders. It teaches students a variety of skills that are useful for them if they choose to go into the military, go to a military academy, or join the civilian workforce. AFJROTC classes at Blue Ridge High are: Air Force JROTC 1, 2, 3, 4, 7 Honors, and 8 Honors.

=== Foreign Language ===
==== Spanish ====
Blue Ridge High offers Spanish classes. The offered classes are Spanish 1, 2 Honors, 3 Honors, and 4 Honors.

==== French ====
Blue Ridge High offers French classes. The offered classes are French 1, 2 Honors, 3 Honors, and 4 Honors.

=== Fine Arts ===
==== Visual Art ====
Visual art classes at Blue Ridge High include Art 1, 2, and 3 Honors, Ceramics 1 and 2, and Photography 1 and 2.

===== Band =====
Band classes at Blue Ridge High are Instrumental Band 1, 2, 3, 4, 5 Honors, 6 Honors, 7 Honors, 8 Honors, Marching Band 1, 2, 3, and 4.

==== Chorus ====
Chorus classes offered are Chorus 1, Chorus Ensemble 1, 2, 7 Honors, and 8 Honors. Blue Ridge High choral ensembles were State Champions in 2009 and 2014.

==== Strings/Orchestra ====
Strings/Orchestra classes are offered at Blue Ridge High. They are Orchestra 1, 2, 3, 4, 5, 1 Honors, 2 Honors, 3 Honors, 4 Honors, 5 Honors, 6 Honors, 7 Honors, and 8 Honors.

=== Miscellaneous Classes ===
Miscellaneous classes at Blue Ridge High include Media Resources/Management, a class where students learn how to operate and maintain a media center, Release Time, a class where students attend off campus to receive Religious Instruction, and ESOL (English Speakers of Other Languages), a class for students that provides assistance to students whose primary language is a language other than English and they are not proficient in listening, speaking, writing, or comprehension in an English speaking class.

== Extracurricular Activities ==
=== Clubs and Organizations ===
Clubs and Organizations at Blue Ridge High include an Art Club, Band programs such as, a Marching Band (which is a 8-time state champion), Color Guard, Winter Guard, a Beta Club, a Book Club, Sideline Cheerleading, an Future Business Leaders of America (FBLA) chapter, a Fellowship of Christian Athletes (FCA), a Future Farmers of America (FFA) chapter, a Health Occupational Students of America (HOSA) chapter, an Interact Club, a Key Club, National Art Honors Society, National Honors Society, a PTSA, a Robotics team, a Science Club, a Theatre Club, International Thespian Society, Yearbook Staff, and a Student Council.

=== Sports ===
Sports at Blue Ridge High include Boys Football, Boys Baseball, Girls Competitive Cheer, Girls Volleyball, Girls Softball, Boys and Girls Basketball, Boys and Girls Cross Country, Boys and Girls Golf, Boys and Girls Soccer, Boys and Girls Tennis, Boys and Girls Wrestling, and Boys and Girls Track and Field.
