= Carolina Academy =

Carolina High School and Academy
- Carolina High School

Location
- Greenville, South Carolina; United States; 34°48′43″N 82°26′35″W

Information
- Type: Free public
- Motto: Whatever it Takes!
- Established: 1956
- School district: Greenville County School District
- Principal: Jeremy Carrick
- Faculty: 100
- Teaching staff: 51.00 (FTE)
- Grades: 9th to 12th
- Enrollment: 908 (2026-27)
- Student to teacher ratio: 15.22
- Campus type: Suburban
- Colors: Navy, orange and white
- Mascot: Trojan
- Yearbook: Carolinian

Carolina High School and Academy of Health Professions and Engineering is located in Greenville, SC. It is a public and magnet high school in Greenville County School District. It serves ninth through twelfth grade students. The student population comes primarily from students who live in nearby neighborhoods and students who are enrolled in the magnet program. Carolina High School is a Title I School.

== Facilities ==
Carolina High School's current building opened in 2006. Carolina High's campus features an engineering lab, courtyard, media center, auditorium, gymnasium, and auxiliary gymnasium. It also includes various other fields used for sports offered by the school.

== History ==
In the mid-1950s, Carolina High was established. Likely consolidating students from Westville High School and Welcome High School.

Carolina High School moved to its current location in 2006. The new facility was part of a district-wide building plan that aimed to improve Greenville County Schools. This offered Carolina High School a brighter atmosphere, updated systems (such as new HVACs), dedicated laboratory spaces, dedicated music rooms, dedicated band rooms, and two gymnasiums. The previous building was demolished and a baseball field was constructed in its place.

The former school building was opened in September 1956. Carolina High School was a segregated school until 1968. Gwendolyn Dandy McGowens, a social studies teacher, was the first African-American teacher on the Carolina Academy staff.

== Magnet Academy ==
Carolina High School's Magnet Academy features two programs. The Academy of Health Professions features classes on biomedical science. The Academy of Engineering features various classes on Engineering in the PLTW (Project Lead the Way) curriculum.

== Feeder Schools ==
The primary feeder middle school of Carolina High School is Tanglewood Middle School. Feeder elementary schools of Carolina High School include Alexander Elementary School, Hollis Academy, and Welcome Elementary School.

== Non Core-Subject Classes ==
In addition to the four traditional core-subject subjects (English, Math, Social Studies, and Science) and the Magnet Academy, Carolina High offers various classes in World Language, Fine Arts, Physical Education, Air Force JROTC, and Career and Technological Education.

=== World Languages ===
Carolina High School offers two languages in its World Language Department for students to study. Spanish and French.

=== Fine Arts ===
Fine Arts classes at Carolina High School include art, digital art, photography, chorus, and band.

=== Career and Technological Education ===
Career and Technical Education classes and/or pathways offered at Carolina High include Health Science, Sports Medicine, Business, and Marketing.

=== Air Force JROTC ===
Air Force JROTC is offered at Carolina High to prepare students who are interested in joining the Air Force, or another branch of the military and to help serve their communities.

=== Physical Education ===
In addition to Physical Education 1, which is a required course to be taken in South Carolina. The Physical Education department at Carolina High offers weightlifting classes.

== Athletics ==
The sports that Carolina High School offers are listed below:

Sports offered at Carolina High School
| Boys | Girls |
|---|---|
| Cross Country | Cross Country |
| Football | Flag Football |
| Basketball | Tennis |
| Wrestling | Volleyball |
| Baseball | Basketball |
| Soccer | Soccer |
| Track and Field | Softball |
| | Track and Field |

== Student Clubs and Organizations ==
Student Clubs and Organizations at Carolina High include a Student Government Association, Chess Club, Dungeons and Dragons Club, Fellowship of Christian Athletes (FCA), French Club, HOSA, National Art Honor Society, National Honor Society, National Technical Honor Society, and a Robotics team.
