= National Register of Historic Places listings in Lee County, South Carolina =

Location of Lee County in South Carolina

This is a list of the National Register of Historic Places listings in Lee County, South Carolina.

This is intended to be a complete list of the properties and districts on the National Register of Historic Places in Lee County, South Carolina, United States. The locations of National Register properties and districts for which the latitude and longitude coordinates are included below, may be seen in a map.

There are 17 properties and districts listed on the National Register in the county. An additional property was once listed, but has since been removed.

This National Park Service list is complete through NPS recent listings posted November 13, 2026.

== Current listings ==
	Name on the Register	Image	Date listed	Location	City or town	Description
1	Ashwood School Gymnasium and Auditorium	Ashwood School Gymnasium and Auditorium	May 25, 2011 (#09000914)	160 Ashwood School Rd. 34°06′28″N 80°18′59″W	Bishopville	
2	Bishopville Commercial Historic District		January 9, 1986 (#86000052)	N. Main St. between W. Church and Cedar Ln. and along Cedar Ln. 34°13′07″N 80°14′48″W	Bishopville	
3	James Carnes House	James Carnes House	January 9, 1986 (#86000051)	200 S. Main St. 34°13′00″N 80°15′07″W	Bishopville	
4	Dennis High School	Dennis High School	January 26, 2005 (#04001565)	410 W. Cedar Ln. 34°13′27″N 80°14′54″W	Bishopville	
5	Thomas Fraser House	Thomas Fraser House	January 9, 1986 (#86000050)	U.S. Route 15; 34°12′37″N 80°15′47″W	Bishopville	
6	William Apollos James House	William Apollos James House	October 6, 1999 (#99000200)	208 N. Dennis Ave. 34°13′13″N 80°14′53″W	Bishopville	
7	Lee County Courthouse	Lee County Courthouse	October 30, 1981 (#81000568)	123 S. Main St. 34°13′02″N 80°14′58″W	Bishopville	Built in 1908, designed by William Augustus Edwards
8	Lynchburg Presbyterian Church	Lynchburg Presbyterian Church	October 1, 2004 (#04001088)	South Carolina Highway 341; 34°03′18″N 80°03′59″W	South Lynchburg	
9	The Manor	The Manor	January 9, 1986 (#86000049)	529 N. Main St. 34°13′27″N 80°14′31″W	Bishopville	
10	Mt. Zion Presbyterian Church	Mt. Zion Presbyterian Church	July 17, 2003 (#03000661)	South Carolina Highway 154, St. Charles Rd. 34°06′02″N 80°13′42″W	Bishopville	
11	Rembert Church	Rembert Church	February 25, 1975 (#75001702)	1 mile east of Woodrow on South Carolina Highway 37; 34°05′51″N 80°21′11″W	Woodrow	
12	William Rogers House	William Rogers House	January 9, 1986 (#86000047)	531 W. Church St. 34°13′22″N 80°15′18″W	Bishopville	
13	St. Philip's Episcopal Church, Bradford Springs	St. Philip's Episcopal Church, Bradford Springs	April 17, 1996 (#96000406)	Bradford Springs Rd., approximately 6 miles north of Dalzell; 34°06′13″N 80°25′33″W	Dalzell	
14	South Main Historic District		January 9, 1986 (#86000048)	S. Main between E. Harris and W. Ridge Sts. 34°12′51″N 80°15′14″W	Bishopville	
15	Spencer House	Spencer House	January 9, 1986 (#86000046)	817 N. Main St. 34°13′44″N 80°14′15″W	Bishopville	
16	Tall Oaks		January 9, 1986 (#86000045)	South Carolina Highway 341; 34°13′35″N 80°15′38″W	Bishopville	
17	Tanglewood Plantation		September 22, 1977 (#77001229)	Southeast of Lynchburg on South Carolina Highway 341; 34°01′55″N 80°01′14″W	Lynchburg	

== Former listings ==
	Name on the Register	Image	Date listed	Date removed	Location	City or town	Description
1	Bishopville High School	Bishopville High School	October 1, 2004 (#04001087)	August 9, 2016	600 N. Main St. 34°13′26″N 80°14′26″W	Bishopville	Torn down in 2016 by county, except for gymnasium and out-buildings added in the 1970s.

== See also ==
- List of National Historic Landmarks in South Carolina
- National Register of Historic Places listings in South Carolina
