= Lizardman (disambiguation) =

Lizardman is a common name for a reptilian humanoid, especially in fantasy.

Lizardman, Lizard Man, Lizardmen, or Lizard Men may also refer to:

- The Lizardman (performer) or Erik Sprague (b. 1972), sideshow performer noted for his extensive body modifications
- Lizard Man of Scape Ore Swamp, a cryptid of the swamps in Lee County, South Carolina
- Lizardman (Soulcalibur), a fictional character from the Soulcalibur series of fighting games
- Lizard Man (Masters of the Universe), a character in He-Man and the Masters of the Universe
- Lizardmen (Warhammer), a fictional race from the Warhammer Fantasy universe
- Lizardfolk, a fictional race in the Dungeons & Dragons roleplaying game
