= Ashwood, South Carolina =

- Census-designated place
- Location within South Carolina Location within the United States
- Coordinates: 34°07′20″N 80°18′05″W
- Country: United States
- State: South Carolina
- County: Lee

Area
  - Total: 3.69 sq mi (9.56 km^{2})
  - Land: 3.57 sq mi (9.25 km^{2})
  - Water: 0.12 sq mi (0.31 km^{2})
- Elevation: 194 ft (59 m)

Population (2020)
  - Total: 116
  - Density: 32.5/sq mi (12.54/km^{2})
- Time zone: UTC-5 (Eastern (EST))
  - Summer (DST): UTC-4 (EDT)
- ZIP Codes: 29010 (Bishopville); 29153 (Sumter)
- Area codes: 803/839
- FIPS code: 45-03115
- GNIS feature ID: 2807064

Ashwood is an unincorporated community and census-designated place (CDP) in Lee County, South Carolina, United States. It was first listed as a CDP prior to the 2020 census which showed a population of 116.

The CDP is in southwestern Lee County, 5 miles (8 km) along U.S. Route 15, 9 miles (14 km) southwest of Bishopville, the county seat, and 13 miles (21 km) north of Sumter. The CDP is bordered to the northeast by Scape Ore Swamp and to the southwest by its tributary McGrits Creek and Ashwood Lake. The community is part of the Black River watershed, flowing to Winyah Bay at Georgetown.

The Ashwood School Gymnasium and Auditorium is a 1930s-era building listed on the National Register of Historic Places.

== Demographics ==
Historical population
Census	Pop.	Note	%±
2020	116		—
U.S. Decennial Census; 2020

Ashwood first appeared as a census designated place in the 2020 U.S. census.

=== Racial and ethnic composition ===
Ashwood CDP, South Carolina – Racial and ethnic composition Note: the US Census treats Hispanic/Latino as an ethnic category. This table excludes Latinos from the racial categories and assigns them to a separate category. Hispanics/Latinos may be of any race.
Race / Ethnicity (NH = Non-Hispanic)	Pop 2020	2020
White alone (NH)	71	61.21%
Black or African American alone (NH)	36	31.03%
Native American or Alaska Native alone (NH)	1	0.86%
Asian alone (NH)	0	0.00%
Native Hawaiian or Pacific Islander alone (NH)	0	0.00%
Other race alone (NH)	0	0.00%
Mixed race or Multiracial (NH)	3	2.59%
Hispanic or Latino (any race)	5	4.31%
Total	116	100.00%
