= Lee County Sheriff's Office =

Lee County Sheriff's Office may refer to:

- Lee County Sheriff's Office (Florida)
- Lee County Sheriff's Office (Virginia)
- Lee County Sheriff's Office, Lee County, South Carolina
