= James Carnes =

James Carnes may refer to:

- James E. Carnes, American politician; served in Ohio State Senate from 1995 to 2004
- James Jewett Carnes (1899–1986), American military leader; Governor of Free Territory of Trieste in 1947
- James J. Carnes, American Navy, chief electrician's mate, namesake of Carnes Crag
- Jimmy Carnes (1934–2011), American track and field athlete, coach and administrator

== See also ==
- James Carne (1906–1986), English recipient of the Victoria Cross
- James Carnes House, Bishopville, South Carolina
