= Una, Darlington and Lee Counties, South Carolina =

Una, South Carolina
- Unincorporated community
- Location within South Carolina Location within the United States
- Coordinates: 34°16′13″N 80°08′04″W
- Country: United States
- State: South Carolina
- Counties: Darlington, Lee
- Elevation: 200 ft (61 m)
- Time zone: UTC-5 (Eastern (EST))
  - Summer (DST): UTC-4 (EDT)
- Area codes: 843, 854
- GNIS feature ID: 1231877

Una is an unincorporated community in the counties of Darlington and Lee, South Carolina, United States. The community is located along U.S. Highway 15 7.4 miles (11.9 km) east-northeast of Bishopville.
