= Lee Park =

Lee Park may refer to:

- Lee State Park, state park at Lee County, South Carolina, United States
- Market Street Park, formerly Lee Park, a park at Charlottesville, Virginia, United States
- Horn Park, Royal Borough of Greenwich, United Kingdom, also historically known as Lee Park

== See also ==
- Tom Lee Park
