= Spencer House (Bishopville, South Carolina) =

Historic house in South Carolina, United States

- U.S. National Register of Historic Places
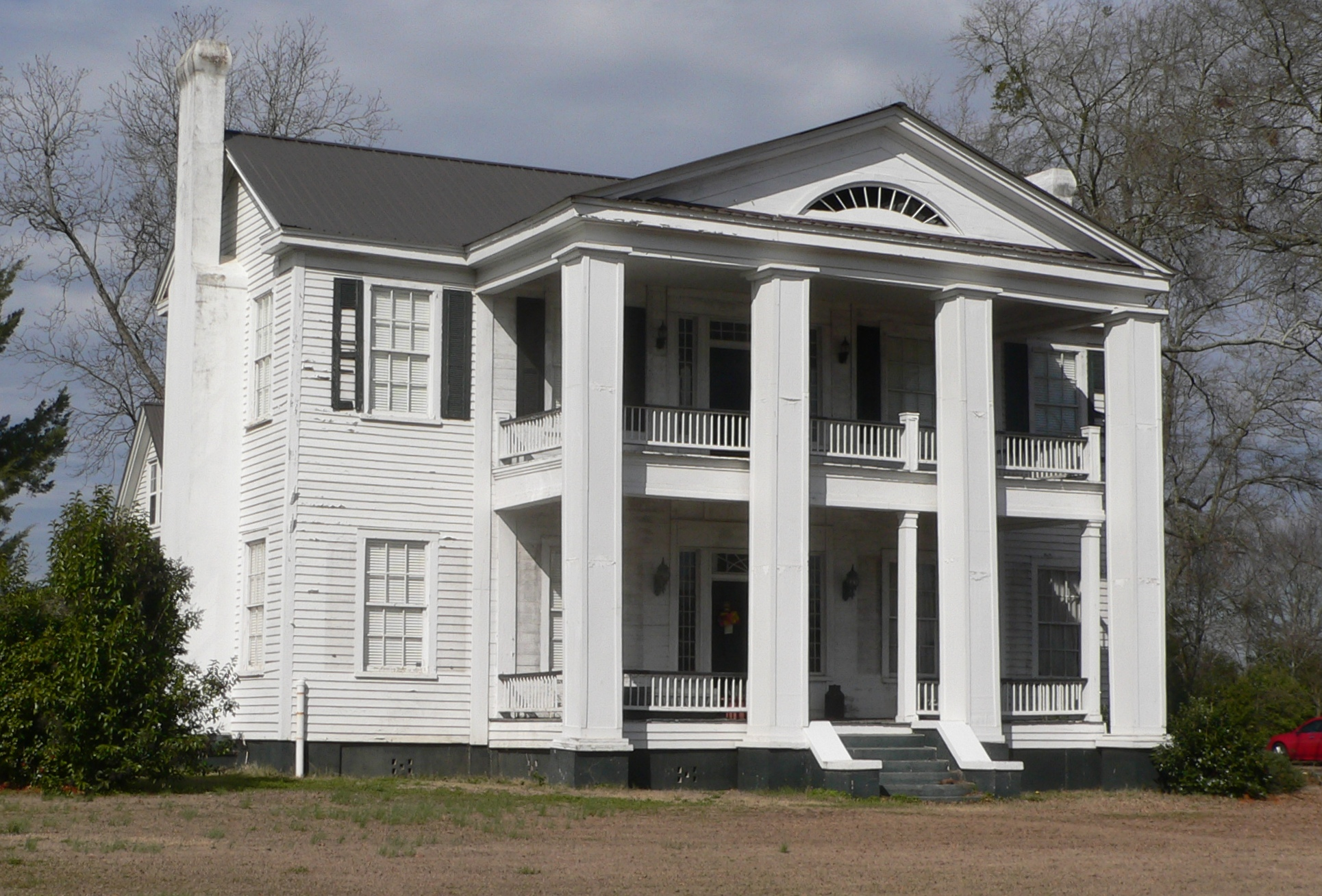
- Spencer house, February 2013

- Location within South Carolina Location within the United States
- Location: 817 N. Main St., Bishopville, South Carolina
- Coordinates: 34°13′39″N 80°14′18″W
- Area: 0.5 acres (0.20 ha)
- Built: c. 1845
- Architectural style: Greek Revival, Vernaculer Greek Revival
- MPS: Bishopville MRA
- NRHP reference No.: 86000046
- Added to NRHP: January 9, 1986

Spencer House, also known as the Gene McLendon House, is a historic home located at Bishopville, Lee County, South Carolina. It was built about 1845, and is a two-story, vernacular Greek Revival style house. It features a two-story, pedimented portico supported by four square frame pillars with Doric order capitals. The house has a one-story, gable roofed rear ell with a large exterior brick chimney. It is very similar in floor plan and appearance to the William Rogers House.

It was added to the National Register of Historic Places in 1986.
