= Thomas Fraser House =

Historic house in South Carolina, United States

- U.S. National Register of Historic Places
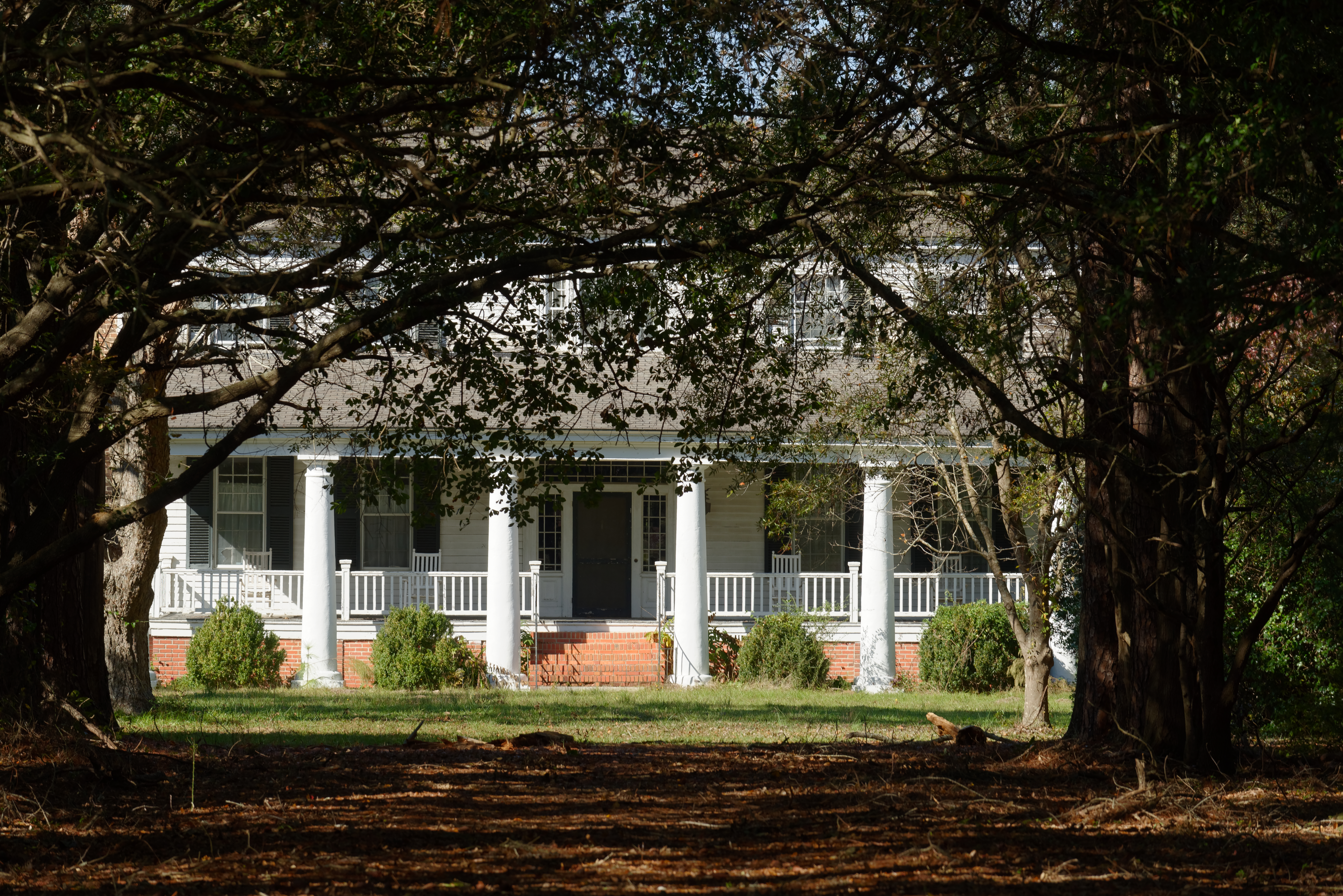

- Location within South Carolina Location within the United States
- Location: US 15, Bishopville, South Carolina
- Coordinates: 34.21014°N 80.26305°W
- Area: 1.7 acres (0.69 ha)
- Built: 1847
- Architectural style: Greek Revival, Vernacular Greek Revival
- MPS: Bishopville MRA
- NRHP reference No.: 86000050
- Added to NRHP: January 9, 1986

Thomas Fraser House, also known as Woodham House and Gregg House, is a historic home located at Bishopville, Lee County, South Carolina. It was built in 1847, and is a two-story, vernacular Greek Revival style house with a gable roof, weatherboard siding and a brick foundation. The front façade features a one-story porch supported by six round brick and stucco columns with prominent bases and Doric order capitals. At the rear of the house is the original kitchen, remodeled about 1900 into a farm office.

It was added to the National Register of Historic Places in 1986.
