= Bishopville Commercial Historic District =

Historic district in South Carolina, United States

- U.S. National Register of Historic Places
- U.S. Historic district
- Location within South Carolina Location within the United States
- Location: N. Main St. between W. Church and Cedar Ln. and along Cedar Ln., Bishopville, South Carolina
- Coordinates: 34°13′07″N 80°14′48″W
- Area: 7.1 acres (2.9 ha)
- Architect: Wilson & Sompayrac
- Architectural style: Classical Revival
- MPS: Bishopville MRA
- NRHP reference No.: 86000052
- Added to NRHP: January 9, 1986

Bishopville Commercial Historic District is a national historic district located at Bishopville, Lee County, South Carolina. It encompasses 48 contributing buildings in the central business district of Bishopville. All of the commercial buildings are of brick construction with most constructed between 1890 and 1920. All of the buildings are used for commercial purposes such as stores, restaurants, offices and banks. Two important buildings are the Seaboard Coastline Depot and the Palmetto Oil Mill.

It was added to the National Register of Historic Places in 1986.
