= Browntown, South Carolina =

- Census-designated place
- Location within South Carolina Location within the United States
- Coordinates: 34°12′19″N 80°18′58″W
- Country: United States
- State: South Carolina
- County: Lee

Area
  - Total: 2.46 sq mi (6.37 km^{2})
  - Land: 2.46 sq mi (6.37 km^{2})
  - Water: 0 sq mi (0.00 km^{2})
- Elevation: 266 ft (81 m)

Population (2020)
  - Total: 206
  - Density: 83.8/sq mi (32.36/km^{2})
- Time zone: UTC-5 (Eastern (EST))
  - Summer (DST): UTC-4 (EDT)
- ZIP Code: 29010 (Bishopville)
- Area codes: 803/839
- FIPS code: 45-09782
- GNIS feature ID: 2807066

Browntown is an unincorporated community and census-designated place (CDP) in Lee County, South Carolina, United States. It was first listed as a CDP prior to the 2020 census. The population as of 2020 was 206.

The CDP is in northwestern Lee County, 4 miles (6 km) west of Bishopville, the county seat. Interstate 20 forms the southern edge of the CDP, with the closest access being from Exit 116 (U.S. Route 15), 3 miles (5 km) to the east. The southwest edge of the CDP is Scape Ore Swamp, a southeast-flowing tributary of the Black River and part of the Winyah Bay watershed.

== Demographics ==
Historical population
Census	Pop.	Note	%±
2020	206		—
U.S. Decennial Census; 2020

Browntown first appeared as a census designated place in the 2020 U.S. census.

=== 2020 census ===
Browntown CDP, South Carolina – Racial and ethnic composition Note: the US Census treats Hispanic/Latino as an ethnic category. This table excludes Latinos from the racial categories and assigns them to a separate category. Hispanics/Latinos may be of any race.
Race / Ethnicity (NH = Non-Hispanic)	Pop 2020	% 2020
White alone (NH)	22	10.68%
Black or African American alone (NH)	174	84.47%
Native American or Alaska Native alone (NH)	1	0.49%
Asian alone (NH)	0	0.00%
Pacific Islander alone (NH)	0	0.00%
Some Other Race alone (NH)	0	0.00%
Mixed Race or Multi-Racial (NH)	7	3.40%
Hispanic or Latino (any race)	2	0.97%
Total	206	100.00%
