= William Apollos James House =

Historic house in South Carolina, United States

- U.S. National Register of Historic Places
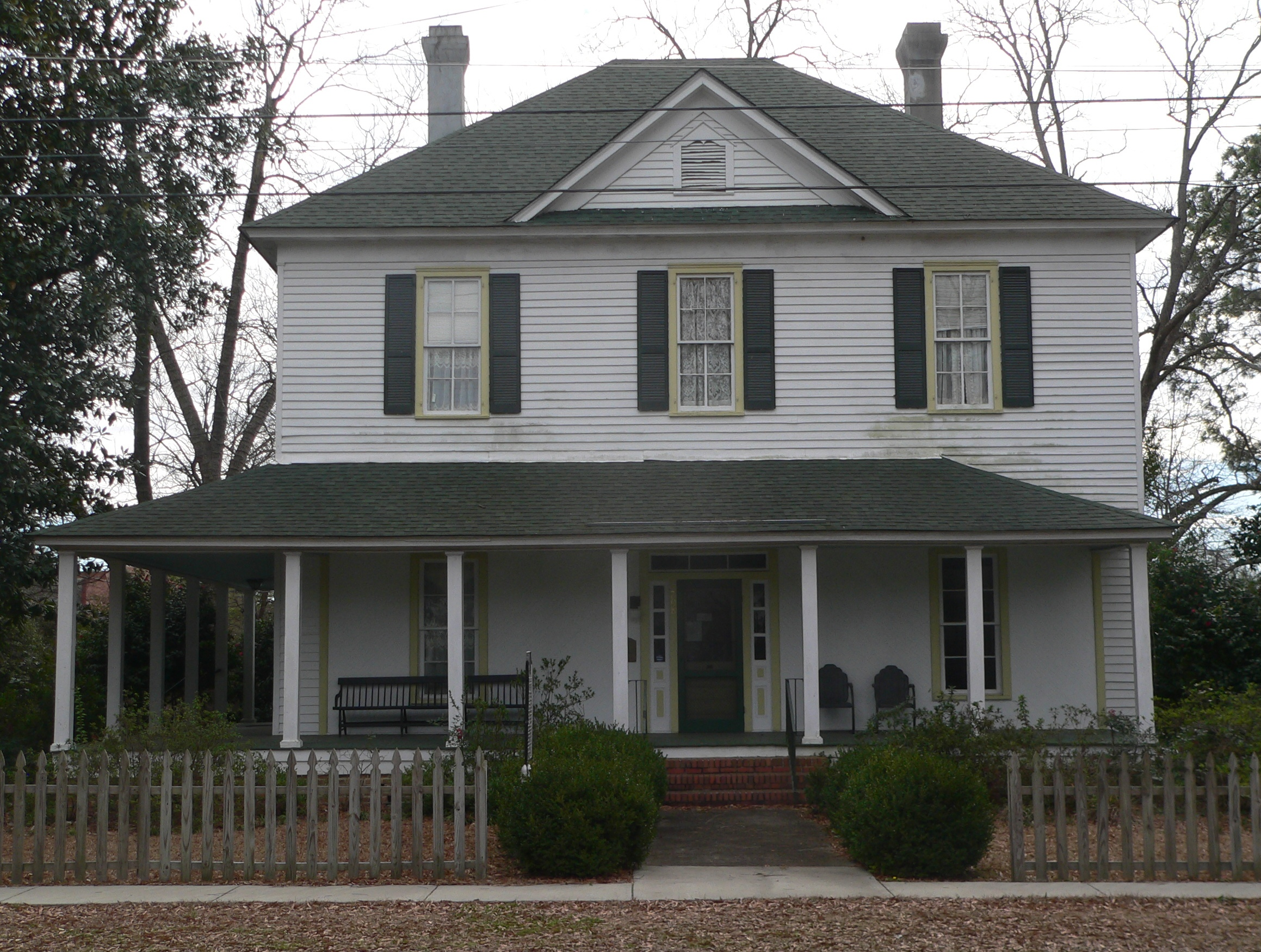
- William Apollos James house, February 2013

- Location within South Carolina Location within the United States
- Location: 208 N. Dennis Ave., Bishopville, South Carolina
- Coordinates: 34°13′11″N 80°14′17″W
- Area: 1 acre (0.40 ha)
- Built: 1903, 1911
- Architectural style: Colonial Revival
- NRHP reference No.: 99000200
- Added to NRHP: October 6, 1999

William Apollos James House is a historic home located at Bishopville, Lee County, South Carolina. It was built in 1903, as a one-story, Folk Victorian cottage with a center gabled dormer. It was enlarged and altered in 1911, in the Colonial Revival style, with the addition of a second story with hipped roof, and a hip-roofed wraparound porch. It was the home of William Apollos James (1857–1930), prominent state representative, agriculturalist, businessman, and community leader of Lee County. Also on the property is a collection of historic and interesting flora in its ornamental and fruit garden, along with mature trees and shrubs. The house serves as the headquarters for the Lee County Historical Society.

It was added to the National Register of Historic Places in 1999.
