= Ashwood School Gymnasium and Auditorium =

- U.S. National Register of Historic Places
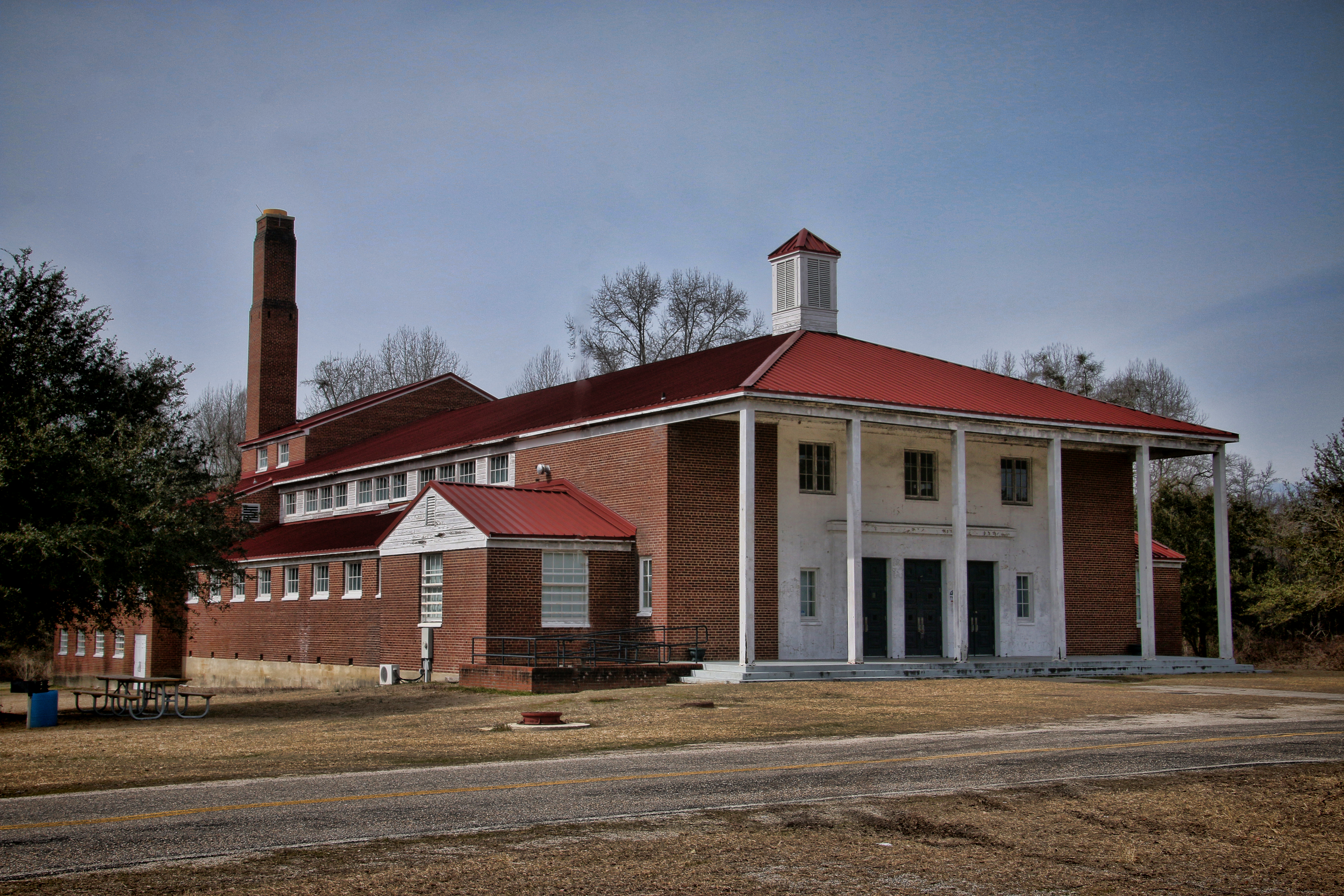

- Location within South Carolina Location within the United States
- Location: 160 Ashwood School Rd., near Bishopville, South Carolina
- Coordinates: 34°06′28″N 80°18′59″W
- Area: 3.3 acres (1.3 ha)
- Built: Less than one acre
- Architect: Goode Company
- Architectural style: Colonial Revival
- NRHP reference No.: 09000914
- Added to NRHP: May 25, 2011

Ashwood School Gymnasium and Auditorium is a historic school gymnasium and auditorium located at Ashwood near Bishopville, Lee County, South Carolina. It was built in 1938 to serve Ashwood Plantation, the first and largest of the Resettlement Administration (RA) project tracts in South Carolina. The building served as the school and community gymnasium and as an auditorium for dramatic performances and films. It is a one-story building with a simplified Colonial Revival style popular in the 1930s in government-sponsored construction.

It was added to the National Register of Historic Places in 2011.
