= Pearl Fryar =

American topiary artist (1939–2026)

- Born: December 4, 1939; Clinton, North Carolina, U.S.
- Died: April 4, 2026 (aged 86); Bishopville, South Carolina, U.S.
- Occupation: Topiary artist

Pearl Faison Fryar (December 4, 1939 – April 4, 2026) was an American topiary artist who lived in Bishopville, South Carolina. He was known for his topiary garden.

== Biography ==
Pearl Fryar was born on December 4, 1939, in Clinton, North Carolina, to a sharecropper family. In the late 1950s, he attended the North Carolina College in Durham. He served in the military and was in the Korean War. After leaving the military, he moved to Queens, New York. In 1975, he began work as a factory engineer at a Coca-Cola soda can factory in Bishopville until his retirement in 2006.

Initially, Fryar wanted to move into Bishopville's city limits. However, he was blocked from purchasing a home in an all-white neighborhood because residents believed a black person would not maintain his property, according to Mike Gibson, who maintains Fryar's topiary garden. Instead he built on the outskirts of town. He began working in his yard to prove his white neighbors wrong with "throwaway" plants rescued from the compost pile at local nurseries and received a Yard of the Month award in 1985. Around 1988, Fryar began trimming the evergreen plants around his yard into unusual shapes. In addition to the boxwood, and yew found there originally, he began transplanting holly, fir, loblolly pine and other plants as they became available. Through his innovative work, Fryar has received recognition as an outsider artist despite not regarding himself as an artist.

In 2006, the documentary A Man Named Pearl was produced by Scott Galloway and Brent Pierson about his work.

Fryar died at his home in Bishopville, South Carolina, on April 4, 2026, at the age of 86.

== Pearl Fryar Topiary Garden ==
Pearl Fryar Topiary Garden is a three acre garden located in Bishopville, South Carolina. Fryar's garden contains over 400 individual plants and is integrated with "junk art" sculptures. The aesthetics of Fryar's work are a departure from traditional topiary work and are considered abstract, inventive, and free-form. In 2007, the Friends of Pearl Fryar Topiary Garden and the Garden Conservancy formed a partnership with Fryar to preserve and maintain the Pearl Fryar Topiary Garden and to further Fryar's message of inspiration and hope. In 2008, a scholarship was created by Fryar and the Friends of Pearl Fryar Topiary Garden to provide for students with lower grades. The nonprofit dissolved in 2018. In 2021, Mike Gibson, a topiary artist from Youngstown, Ohio who had first met Fryar in 2016, began tending the garden due to Fryar's declining health and the COVID-19 pandemic. At that time his position was funded by a $50,000 Central Carolina Community Foundation grant. The garden received the grant after Jane Przybysz, Executive Director at the McKissick Museum in Columbia noticed the decline in the garden's maintenance. During 2020–2022, a new nonprofit, The Pearl Fryar Topiary Garden, Inc. was established to work collaboratively and support the preservation of the artistic and horticultural legacy of Pearl Fryar.

The Pearl Fryar Topiary Garden
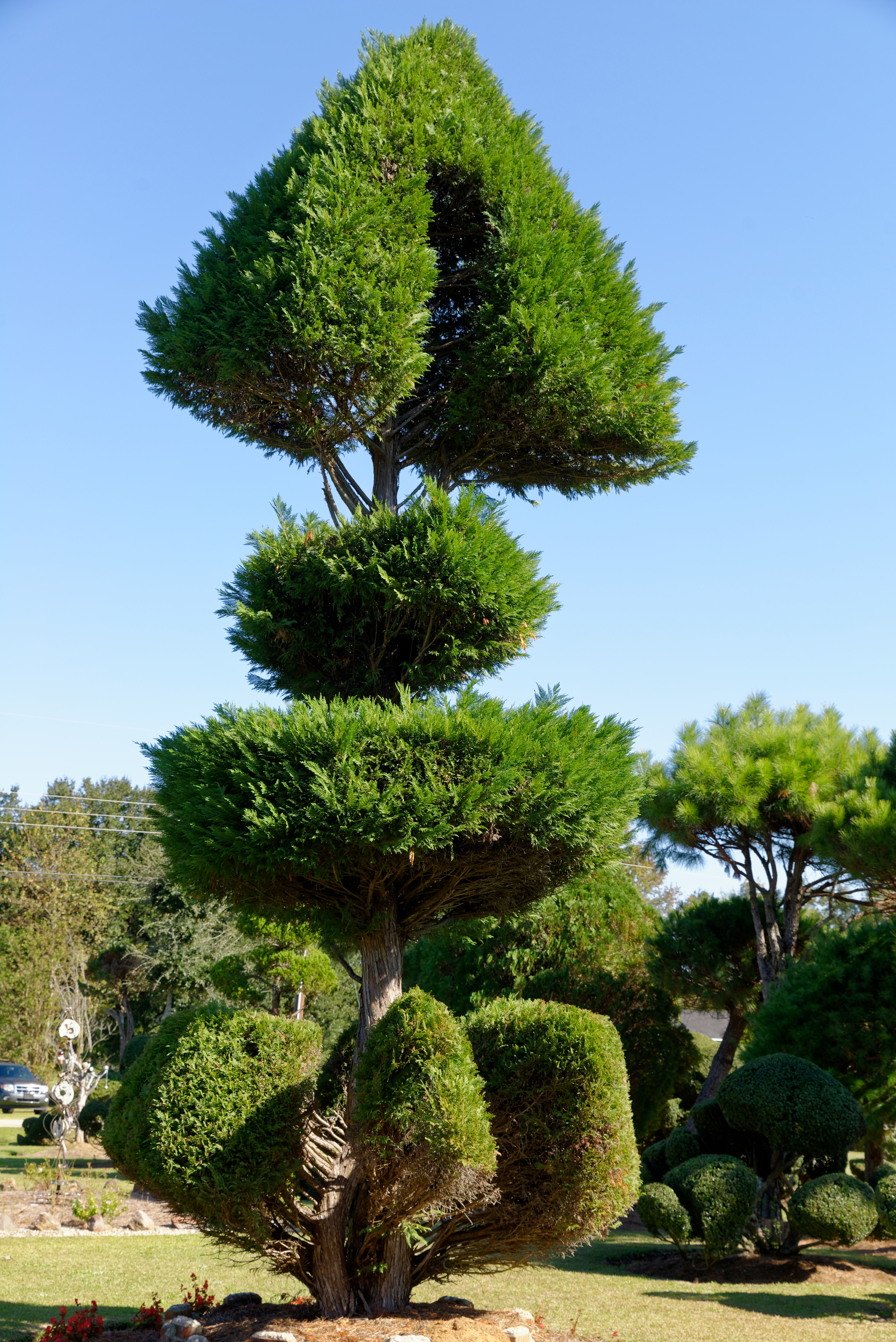
Fishbone tree

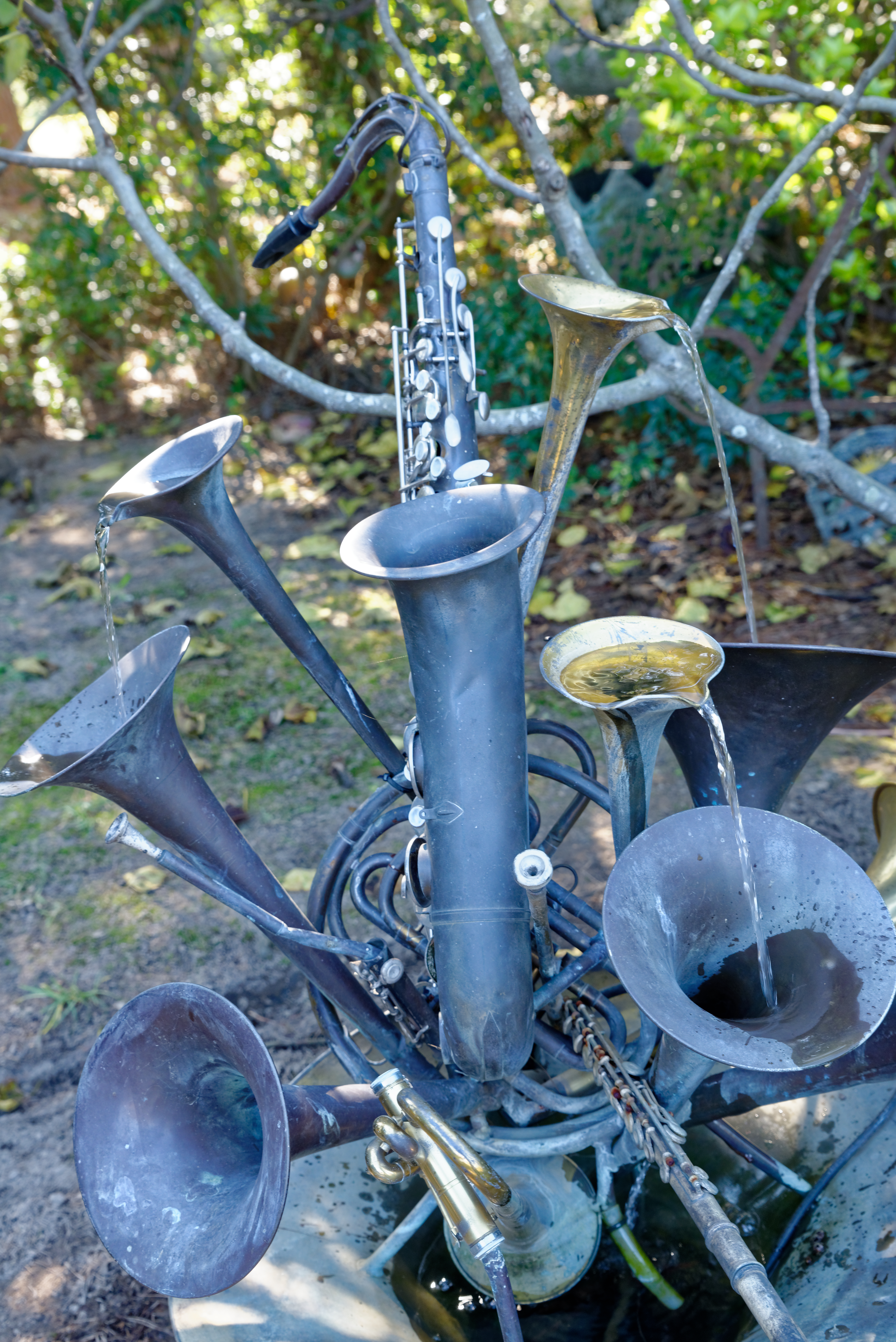
A junk art sculpture

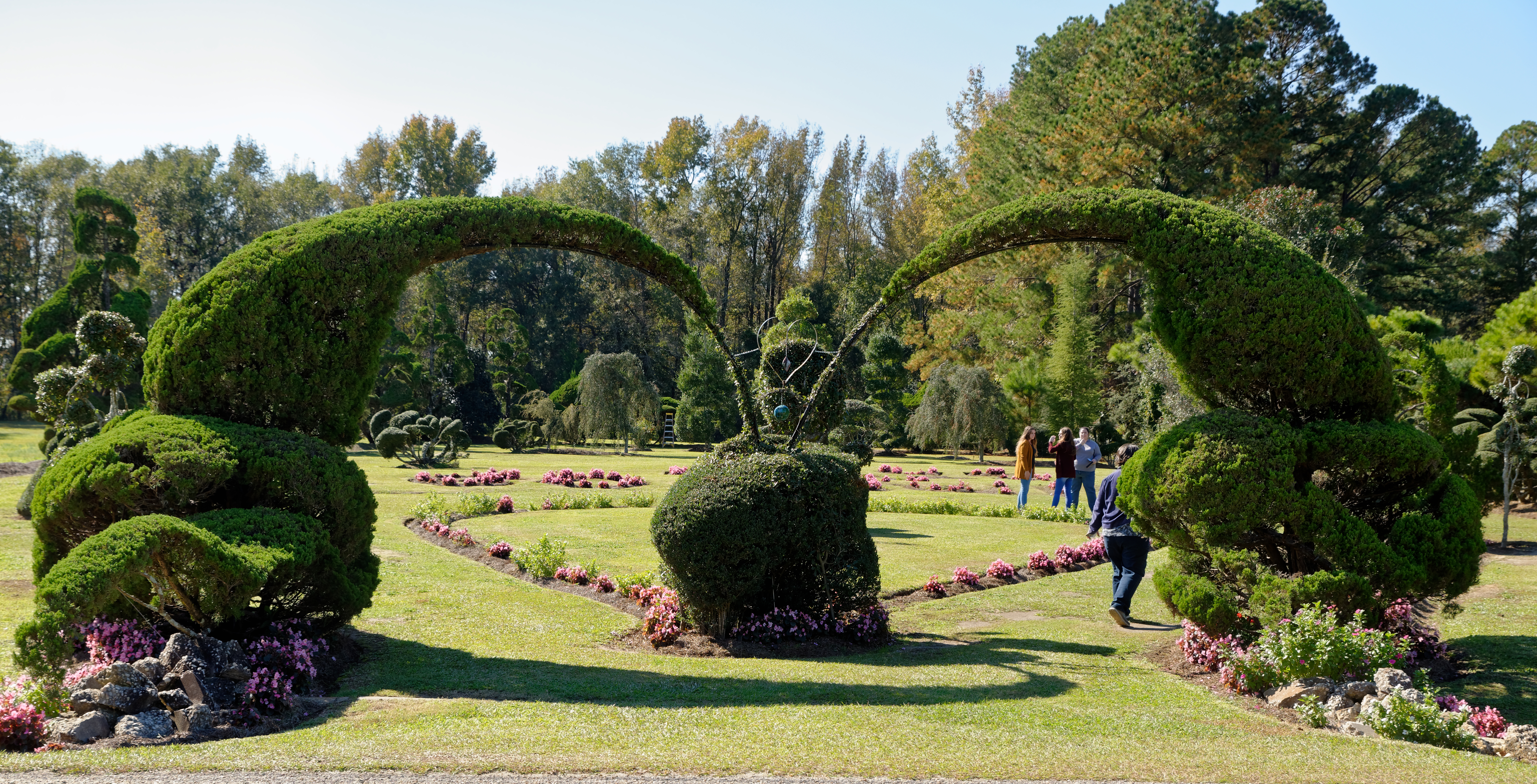

== Awards and accolades ==
- "The Heart Garden" collaboration with Philip Simmons for Spoleto Festival USA's "Human/Nature" installations (1997)
- June 27 was recognized as Pearl Fryar Day by the South Carolina General Assembly for his "humanitarian ideals and artistic influence" (1998)
- Elizabeth O'Neill Verner Governor’s Award for the Arts (2013)
- Award of Excellence from National Garden Clubs Inc. (2017)
