= Tall Oaks =

Historic house in South Carolina, United States

- U.S. National Register of Historic Places
- Location within South Carolina Location within the United States
- Location: SC 341, Bishopville, South Carolina
- Coordinates: 34°13′35″N 80°15′38″W
- Area: 4.1 acres (1.7 ha)
- Built: c. 1847
- Architectural style: Mid 19th Century Revival, Vernacular Greek Revival
- MPS: Bishopville MRA
- NRHP reference No.: 86000045
- Added to NRHP: January 9, 1986

Tall Oaks, also known as the S. McLendon House, is a historic home located at Bishopville, Lee County, South Carolina. It was built in 1847, and is a two-story, vernacular Greek Revival style house. It has a hipped roof and rests on a brick foundation. On the front façade is a two-story, gable-roofed pedimented portico with four large stuccoed brick columns and Doric order capitals. An original brick kitchen still stands behind the main house.

It was added to the National Register of Historic Places in 1986.
