= Rembert Church =

Historic church in South Carolina, United States

- U.S. National Register of Historic Places
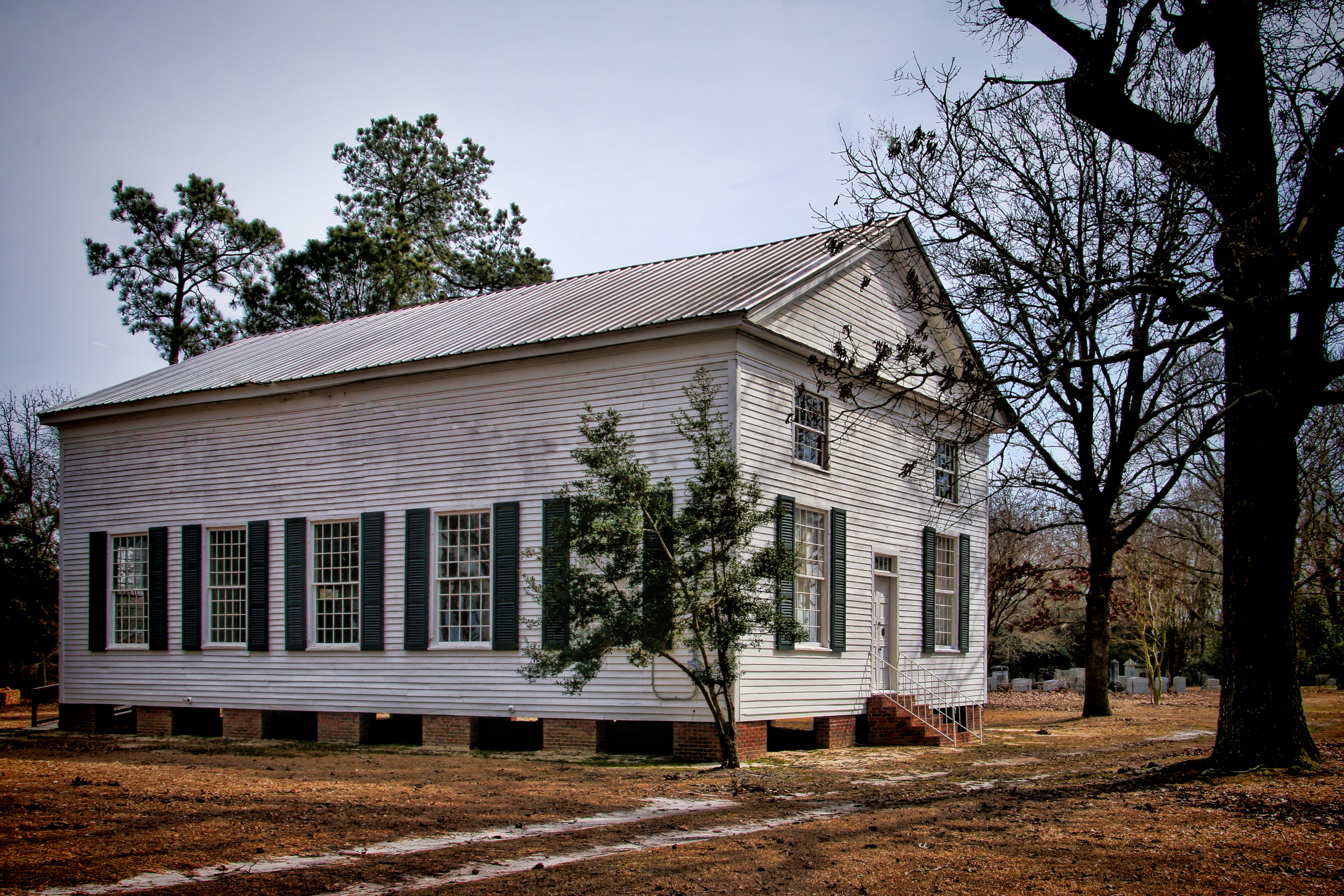

- Location within South Carolina Location within the United States
- Location: 1 mile east of Woodrow on South Carolina Highway 37, near Woodrow, South Carolina
- Coordinates: 34°5′51″N 80°21′11″W
- Area: 11 acres (4.5 ha)
- Built: 1835
- Architectural style: Meeting House Style
- NRHP reference No.: 75001702
- Added to NRHP: February 25, 1975

Rembert Church, also known as Rembert Methodist Church, is a historic Methodist church located near Woodrow, Lee County, South Carolina. It was built around 1835 and features a simple meeting house style with rectangular shape and clapboard siding. The adjacent cemetery was established in 1800. It is one of the earliest Methodist congregations in South Carolina, with a Methodist Society meeting as early as 1785. In its early days, it was frequently visited by Francis Asbury, the first Bishop of the Methodist Church of the United States.

The church was added to the National Register of Historic Places in 1975.
