= Button King =

American artist and musician (1930–2016)

The Button King
- Born: Dalton Stevens; April 28, 1930
- Died: November 21, 2016 (aged 86)
- Occupations: Artist, musician, curator
- Known for: Button art

Dalton Stevens (April 28, 1930 – November 21, 2016), better known as the Button King, was a hobbyist, outsider artist and musician notable for his unusual button art and related media appearances. Since 1983, Stevens had painstakingly decorated various objects with thousands of colorful buttons.

These works include the suits and shoes he wore, the guitar he played, and a 1983 Chevrolet Chevette. Stevens had also created and operated a roadside museum in Bishopville, South Carolina which houses his art.

== Background ==
Dalton Stevens' hobby of sewing buttons onto things began as a reaction to suffering from chronic insomnia for years. "I have insomnia and I would go sometimes four to five days and nights without sleeping," he explains. In 1983, his inability to sleep after television broadcasting ended at 2 am led him to discover that sewing buttons helped him pass the time while his wife Sue slept.

== Button art ==
The first item Stevens began sewing buttons onto was a pair of denim pants. "I had nothing else to do while my family slept at night," Dalton says. According to Stevens, he sewed a total of 16,333 buttons onto his denim suit, the buttons took almost three years to sew, and they add 16 pounds in weight to the suit. At first he used the title "Button Man" but this soon changed to "the Button King".

There are 3,005 buttons on his guitar and 517 buttons on the shoes he first adorned to match his suits. He had also sewn, glued or otherwise attached buttons to two other suits, a hearse, an outhouse, a bathtub and sink, a piano, a guitar and a grandfather clock. Stevens has also covered two coffins with around 600,000 buttons each. One of the coffins is intended for use at his funeral, and the other is for display at his museum as a lasting testimony to his work. The Button King Museum opened in 2008 in a building next to his home that was built for him by his children.

Stevens played guitar, banjo and mandolin and sang songs he had written to entertain others and inform them about his unusual story. Songs he had written include "Insomniac Shuffle" and "Poppin' Buttons", which have been made available on a self-released album.

== Media appearances ==
Stevens had initially appeared in a local newspaper in Bishopville called the Lee County Observer. After that the television station NewsChannel 15 in Florence, South Carolina, broadcast a feature segment on him. These local appearances resulted in a national cable television appearance on CNN. Through these early media appearances, Stevens gained additional recognition for his unusual work in Star Magazine. This magazine appearance came to the attention of the producers of The Tonight Show Starring Johnny Carson, and the Button King appeared on the show on March 19, 1987. Stevens subsequently appeared on the David Letterman show and in a commercial.

In 1992, the Button King was featured among several art car artists in the Harrod Blank documentary Wild Wheels. In 1998, the Button King was featured in Episode 4 of Weird Homes.

A display wall in the Button King museum celebrates Stevens' media appearances, which also include Time, Roadsideamerica.com, and TV appearances with Bill Cosby, Geraldo and Regis and Kathy Lee. The Button King was featured in a 2010 episode of Destination Truth.

== Personal life ==
Stevens' wife of 53 years, Ruby, died in 2008. Stevens was seen regularly at his museum on Joe Dority Road in Bishopville, South Carolina. He died on November 21, 2016.
