= Alcot, South Carolina =

Settlement in South Carolina, United States

Coordinates: 34°15′03″N 80°10′48″W

Alcot is an unincorporated community in Lee County, in the U.S. state of South Carolina.

== History ==
Alcot was founded about 1900, and named after Louisa May Alcott, a favorite author of the postmaster's daughter. A post office called Aclot was established in 1894, and remained in operation until 1906.

In 1925, Alcot had 65 inhabitants.
