= James C. Capers Jr. =

United States Marine Corps Medal of Honor recipient (born 1937)

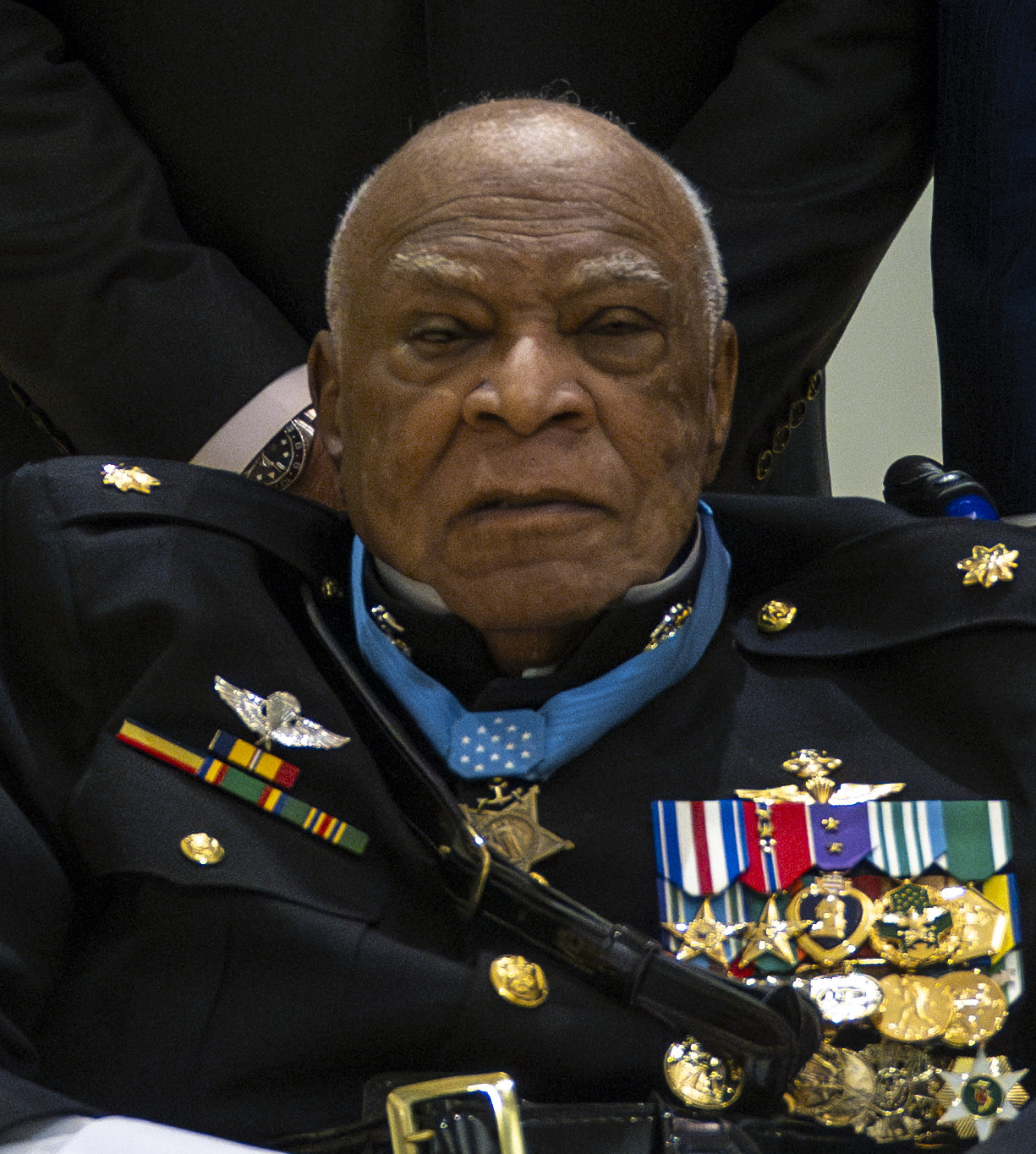
- James C. Capers Jr. in 2026
- Born: August 25, 1937 (age 89)
- Military career
- Allegiance: United States of America
- Branch: United States Marine Corps
- Service years: 1953–1970
- Rank: Major
- Units: 3rd Force Reconnaissance Company, 3rd Reconnaissance Battalion, 3rd Marine Division
- Conflicts: Vietnam War
- Awards: Medal of Honor; Silver Star; Bronze Star (3) with "V" Device; Purple Heart(3); Commendation Medal Joint Service; Commendation Medal Navy & Marine Corps.

James Charles Capers Jr. (born August 25, 1937) is a United States Marine who received the United States's highest military decoration, the Medal of Honor, for heroism in Vietnam in March–April 1967.

== Early years ==
Capers lived in Bishopville, South Carolina, as a child but his sharecropper family left the Jim Crow era South for life in Baltimore, where he spent the rest of his youth and met his wife Dottie.

== Medal of Honor ==
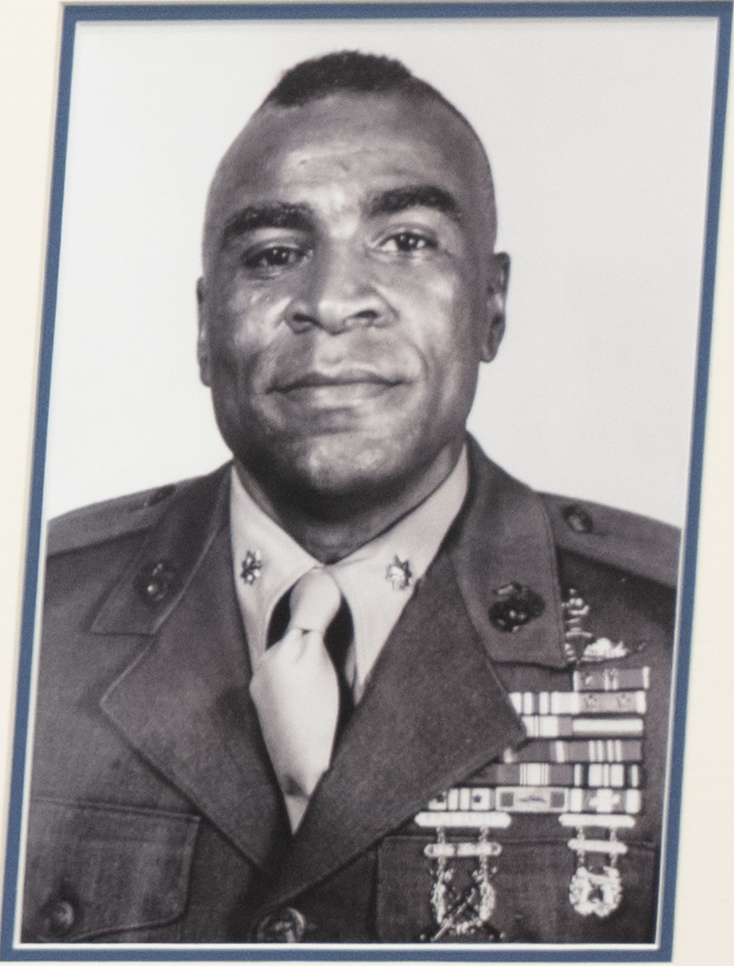
James Capers Jr. (unknown date)

In 2025, Congressman Ralph Norman introduced legislation to award Capers the Medal of Honor. In 2026, US Senator Lindsey Graham introduced similar legislation, which was read and advanced.

On June 18, 2026, President Donald Trump awarded the Medal of Honor to Capers. Dignitaries present at the ceremony included Pete Hegseth, Lindsey Graham, General Dan Caine, and Gerald Malloy The award came 60 years after Capers' actions in Vietnam.

== Medal of Honor citation ==

The President of the United States of America, authorized by Act of Congress, March 3, 1863, has awarded in the name of Congress the Medal of Honor to

SECOND LIEUTENANT
JAMES C. CAPERS JR.
UNITED STATES MARINE CORPS

For conspicuous gallantry and intrepidity at the risk of his life above and beyond the call of duty as a Team Leader with 3d Force Reconnaissance Company, 3d Reconnaissance Battalion in the Republic of Vietnam from 31 March to 3 April 1967. Tasked to locate a North Vietnamese regimental base camp southwest of Phu Loc and provide observation for the flank of Company M, 3d Battalion, 26th Marines, Second Lieutenant Capers maneuvered his nine-man team on a four-day patrol through rugged enemy territory. The team had contact with 20 enemy soldiers on the first day of patrol, and two additional contacts on the second day, resulting in one severely wounded team member. Despite being outnumbered by enemy forces, Second Lieutenant Capers relentlessly pursued his vigilant and tenacious adversary, and called for fire on an enemy base camp to thwart an impending attack on Company M. On the last day of the patrol, his team was engaged by a numerically superior enemy force with an initial attack from claymore mines, coupled with direct and indirect fire. Despite severe pain and blood loss caused by the multiple fragmentation and gunshot wounds he sustained, Second Lieutenant Capers bravely continued to lead his team and maintain the initiative. Even after being administered morphine, he continued to coordinate supporting fires and his team’s movement to a helicopter extraction site. While struggling to maintain consciousness and still under enemy attack, Second Lieutenant Capers maintained command of the situation to ensure all of his Marines were evacuated before he, barely able to stand, finally boarded the helicopter. By his bold leadership, undaunted courage, and complete dedication to duty, Second Lieutenant Capers reflected great credit upon himself and upheld the highest traditions of the Marine Corps and the United States Naval Service.

== Other recognition ==
Capers was celebrated by Bishopville, South Carolina with the installation of three bronze plaques. One plaque is a map of North and South Vietnam. The other details Capers career. The middle plaque is a reproduction of a recruiting poster featuring Capers in his blue dress uniform with the words “Ask a Marine.” The three plaques are titled “The Place, The Legend, The Man.”:

== See also ==
- List of Medal of Honor recipients
- List of Medal of Honor recipients for the Vietnam War
- List of African-American Medal of Honor recipients
