= Mt. Zion Presbyterian Church (Bishopville, South Carolina) =

Historic church in South Carolina, United States

- U.S. National Register of Historic Places
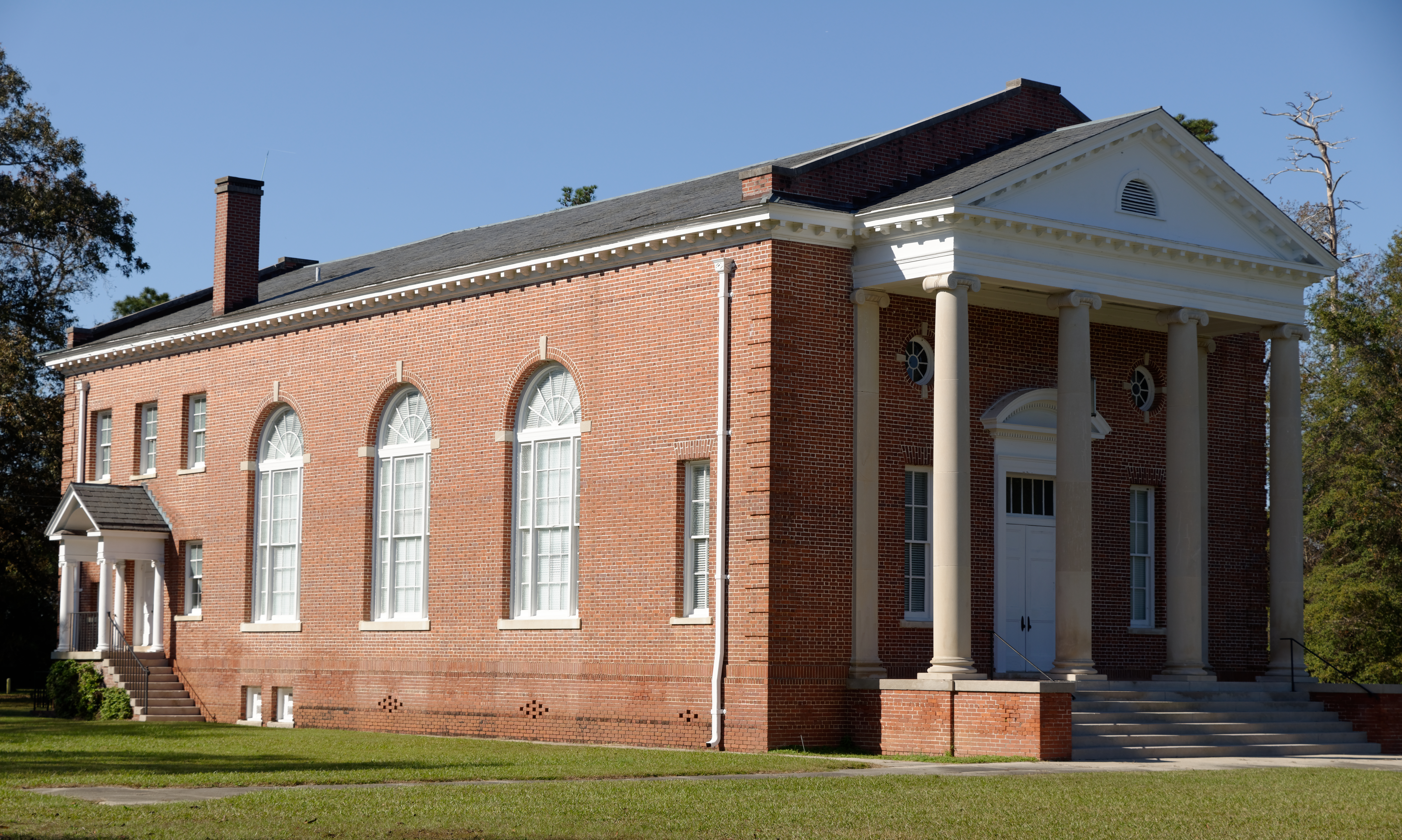

- Location within South Carolina Location within the United States
- Location: South Carolina Highway 154, St. Charles Rd., near Bishopville, South Carolina
- Coordinates: 34.10056°N 80.22846°W
- Area: 5 acres (2.0 ha)
- Built: 1851, 1911
- Architect: Wilson & Sompayrac; Padgett, William
- Architectural style: Classical Revival
- NRHP reference No.: 03000661
- Added to NRHP: July 17, 2003

Mt. Zion Presbyterian Church is a historic Presbyterian church located near Bishopville Lee County, South Carolina. It was built in 1911, and is a linear gable-front, temple-form, two-story brick building in the Neoclassical style. Set upon a raised brick foundation, the building's most imposing feature is its tetrastyle portico featuring a full-width masonry stair with cheek walls and monumental limestone columns and pilasters of the Ionic order. Directly to the rear of the church building is a small, one-story lateral-gabled frame building, constructed in 1851 as Mt. Zion's Session House.

It was added to the National Register of Historic Places in 2003.
