= The Manor (Bishopville, South Carolina) =

Historic house in South Carolina, United States

- U.S. National Register of Historic Places
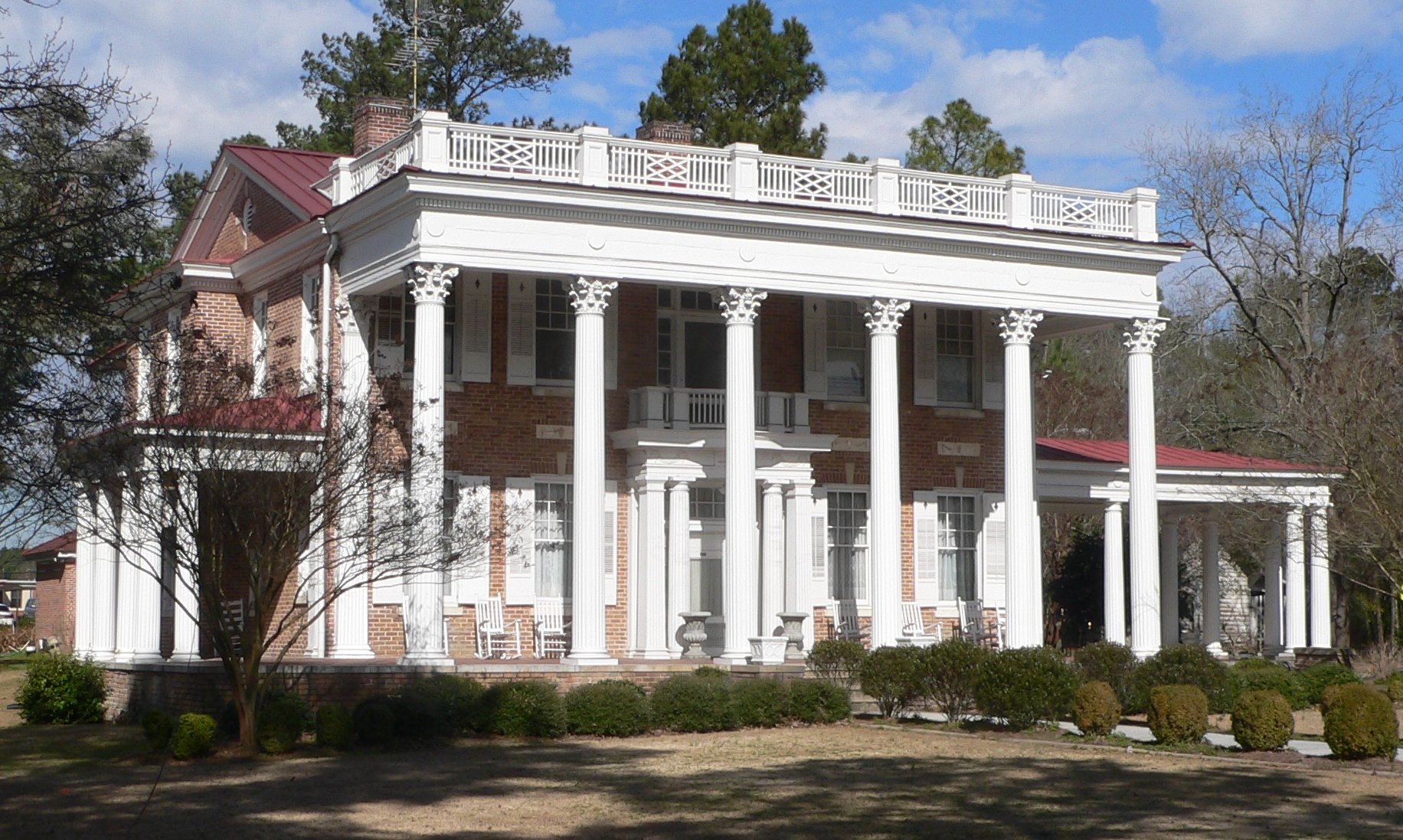
- The Manor, February 2013

- Location within South Carolina Location within the United States
- Location: 529 N. Main St., Bishopville, South Carolina
- Coordinates: 34°13′23″N 80°14′31″W
- Area: 1.4 acres (0.57 ha)
- Built: 1914-1918
- Architect: Johnson, J.H.
- Architectural style: Classical Revival
- MPS: Bishopville MRA
- NRHP reference No.: 86000049
- Added to NRHP: January 9, 1986

The Manor, also known as The Tisdale House, now The Cullifer Manor is an historic home located at Bishopville, Lee County, South Carolina. It was built between 1914 and 1918, and is a two-story, rectangular Neoclassical style brick dwelling. It has a gable roof and two interior brick chimneys. On the front façade is a free-standing, two-story portico with six wooden Corinthian order columns, and a balustrade, and decorative railing along the roofline. Also on the property are two original, one-story brick, hip-roofed buildings which serve as a garage and storage area for the main house.

The home was recently purchased on September 18, 2020, by Kevin and Jenna Cullifer.

It was added to the National Register of Historic Places in 1986.
