= Lizard Man of Scape Ore Swamp =

Creature said to inhabit swampland in South Carolina

Lizard Man
Creature information
- Other name(s): Lizard Man of Scape Ore Swamp, Lizard Man of Lee County, Bishopville Monster
- Folklore: Cryptid, Reptilian Humanoid

Origin
- First attested: 1988
- Country: United States
- Region: South Carolina

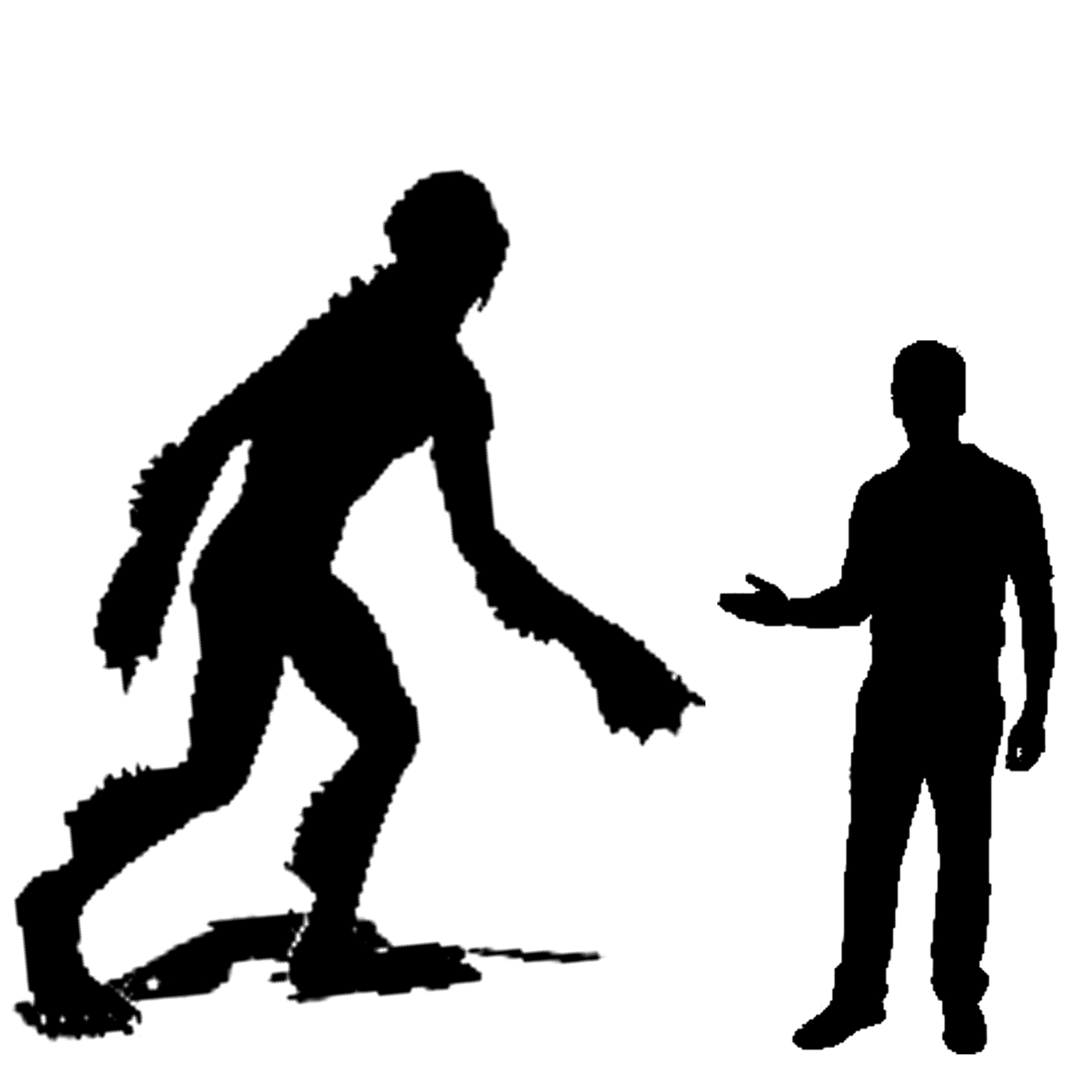
Size visualisation of the Lizard Man vs. an average human

In the folklore of Lee County, South Carolina, the Lizard Man of Scape Ore Swamp (also known as the Lizard Man of Lee County) is an entity said to inhabit the swampland of the region. First mentioned in the late 1980s, the purported sightings and damage attributed to the creature yielded a significant amount of newspaper, radio, and television publicity.

Professor of religious studies Joseph P. Laycock described the media frenzy and subsequent cult appreciation for this and other similar claims as following a predictable "chain of events – a strange sighting, media attention, more sightings, followed by visits from curious tourists and monster hunters". Researcher Ben Radford states that this is a compelling story, "but several important aspects wither under skeptical scrutiny".

== History ==
On July 14, 1988, the Lee County sheriff's office investigated a report of a car damaged overnight while parked at a home in the area of Browntown outside Bishopville, South Carolina, on the edges of the Scape Ore Swamp. The car reportedly had toothmarks and scratches with hair and muddy footprints left behind. Sheriff Liston Truesdale noted this was the start of various claims that eventually coalesced into a story about a lizard man in the swamp. Prompted by the news of the vehicle damage, 17-year-old local Christopher Davis reported to the sheriff that his car was damaged two weeks prior by a creature he described as "green, wetlike, about 7 feet (2.1 m) tall" that allegedly possessed "three fingers, red eyes, skin like a lizard, [and] snakelike scales". According to Davis, he was driving home from working the night shift at a fast food restaurant when his car experienced a flat tire. He claimed that upon fixing it, he witnessed a creature walking towards him. Davis entered his car and began to drive, but the creature was soon on top of the vehicle. He applied his brakes, which led the creature to roll off the car, giving Davis enough time to escape. Coverage by newspapers and media resulted in increased attention focusing on his claims. Local businesses began selling "Lizard Man" T-shirts, and the local chamber of commerce encouraged the media attention as "good for the community".

The increase in newspaper and media publicity prompted further reports of sightings, and the area soon became a tourist attraction for curiosity seekers and monster hunters. Local radio station WCOS offered a $1 million reward to anybody who could capture the creature alive. On August 5, an airman stationed at Shaw Air Force Base named Kenneth Orr filed a police report alleging that he had encountered the Lizard Man on Highway 15 as well as claiming to have shot and wounded it. He presented several scales and a small quantity of blood as evidence. Orr recanted this account two days later when he was arraigned for unlawfully carrying a pistol and for the misdemeanor offense of filing a false police report. According to Orr, he had hoaxed the sighting in order to keep stories about the Lizard Man in circulation. Reports of the creature gradually declined at the end of the summer. Local law enforcement officials speculated that the sightings were likely to have been a bear.

In 2008, CNN mentioned the Lizard Man legend in a story about a couple in Bishopville who reported damage to their vehicle, including blood traces. The blood traces were subsequently found to be from a domestic dog, though the local sheriff suggested it might have been a coyote or wolf. In 2015, local television station WCIV featured photos and videos claimed to be the Lizard Man, allegedly taken by Jim Wilson and other unidentified individuals. In August 2017, the South Carolina Emergency Management Division sent a humorous tweet "regarding possible paranormal activity" during the solar eclipse that passed over the area, hinting that people of Lee and Sumter counties should "remain vigilant" for sightings of the Lizard Man.

== Criticism ==
Skeptical investigator Ben Radford states that the details of Chris Davis's story do not hold up under scrutiny. Sheriff Truesdale stated that Davis's story never wavered, but Radford writes that isn't true, asserting that over weeks and months and repeated tellings, the details changed many times, from the creature having scales to "being packed with mud", whether or not it had attacked the car, and also the animal's proximity to Davis when he first observed it. Radford questioned how Davis was able to discern details of the Lizard Man at 2:00 a.m. when there was no lighting nearby in a heavily wooded area at a time when the moon was not particularly bright. Radford further questioned that, if this was an aggressive creature, why were there no other credible sightings? According to Radford, the timing of Davis' story didn't make sense. If Davis saw the creature in the shadows while he was closing the trunk of his car, Davis still had to reenter the car and take off, yet Davis claims that the approaching creature was so fast that it caught up to the vehicle when he was traveling 40 mph (64 km/h). Reports vary with the source that Davis told the police about the attack two or more weeks later.

After investigating, Radford states that the polygraph test administered to Davis may have been a "publicity stunt" by Southern Marketing, Inc., a company "[arranging] personal appearances for Davis". Another curious issue was that there were no photographs taken of the damage to Davis's car to provide evidence that something happened. Newspaper accounts give various descriptions of the damage to the car, and in one local newspaper Davis is quoted as saying that he "escaped with no more than a scratch on his fender". Radford states that Davis's report "is quite literally incredible, riddled with both implausibilities and impossibilities. It may be sincere or it may be a hoax, but in either event no hard evidence of the creature has been found." Radford also references Lyle Blackburn's work Lizard Man: The True Story of the Bishopville Monster, specifically with regard to Davis reportedly not entirely dismissing the potential explanation that the creature may have actually been a "bear with wet, green mud covering its fur".

Investigator Alicia Lutz has suggested that what Davis saw was actually a local butterbean farmer, Lucious Elmore, who was guarding his shed that night after recent thefts. Elmore claimed he heard a car tire blow out and, thinking it was thieves, walked out to the road to confront them. Elmore said when Davis saw him, he screamed and took off.

== Media ==
In 2010, the TV program Destination Truth featured the legendary creature. Children's books such as Maniacal Monsters and Bizarre Beasts include the monster in their bestiaries. Linda Godfrey's 2014 book American Monsters: A History of Monster Lore, Legends, and Sightings in America includes a chapter on the Lizard Man, and cryptozoologist Lyle Blackburn's 2013 book Lizard Man: The True Story of the Bishopville Monster details the entire history of the creature. The Lizard Man has also appeared on the SYFY show Fact or Faked in an episode titled "Reptile Rampage".

The original contemporaneous story ran in more than 100 newspapers across the country.

== See also ==
- List of reptilian humanoids
- Loveland frog
- Thetis Lake Monster
