= South Main Historic District (Bishopville, South Carolina) =

Historic district in South Carolina, United States

- U.S. National Register of Historic Places
- U.S. Historic district
- Location within South Carolina Location within the United States
- Location: S. Main between E. Harris and W. Ridge Sts., Bishopville, South Carolina
- Coordinates: 34°12′51″N 80°15′14″W
- Area: 8.5 acres (3.4 ha)
- Architectural style: Colonial Revival, Bungalow/craftsman, Queen Anne
- MPS: Bishopville MRA
- NRHP reference No.: 86000048
- Added to NRHP: January 9, 1986

South Main Historic District is a national historic district located at Bishopville, Lee County, South Carolina. It encompasses 11 contributing buildings in a residential section of Bishopville. They were constructed between about 1880 and 1925, and is the best remaining concentration of historic residential architecture in Bishopville. The district contains a fine grouping of late-19th and early-20th century residences reflecting the vernacular Queen Anne, Colonial Revival and Bungalow styles.

It was added to the National Register of Historic Places in 1986.
