= James Carnes House =

Historic house in South Carolina, United States

- U.S. National Register of Historic Places
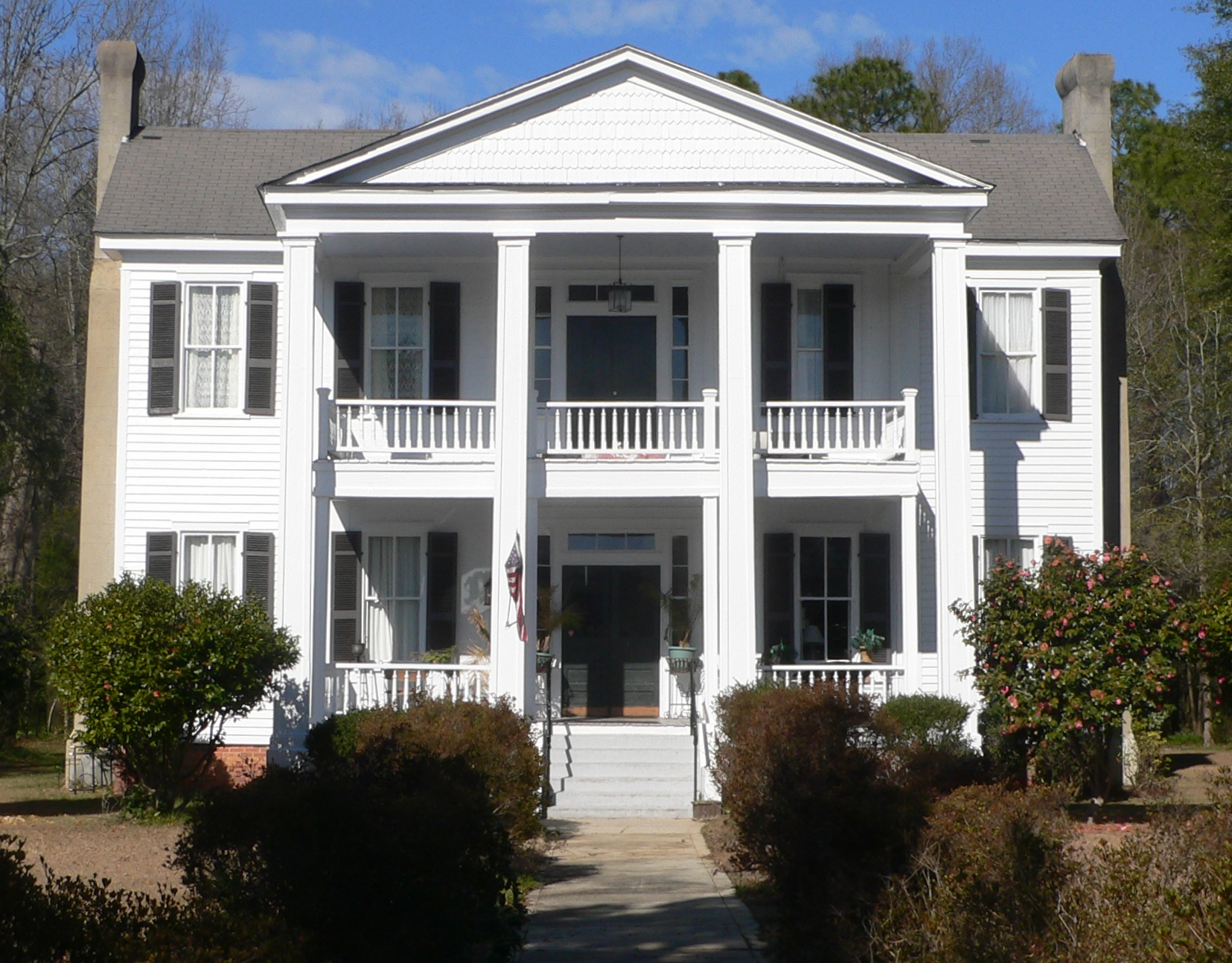
- James Carnes house, February 2013

- Location within South Carolina Location within the United States
- Location: 200 S. Main St., Bishopville, South Carolina
- Coordinates: 34°12′59″N 80°15′7″W
- Area: 3.5 acres (1.4 ha)
- Built: 1836
- Architectural style: Greek Revival, Vernacular Greek Revival
- MPS: Bishopville MRA
- NRHP reference No.: 86000051
- Added to NRHP: January 9, 1986

James Carnes House, also known as "The Myrtles," is a historic home located at Bishopville, Lee County, South Carolina. It was built about 1836, and is a two-story, Greek Revival style frame house. It has a gable roof, weatherboard siding, brick foundation and stuccoed exterior end brick chimneys. The house features a large, two-story, pedimented portico on the front façade, with four larger square, frame columns with Doric order motif capitals. A large 1 1/2-story addition was added to the rear about 1900, when the house was made into a boarding house.

It was added to the National Register of Historic Places in 1986.
