= Reptilian humanoid =

Beings in mythology, folklore and fiction

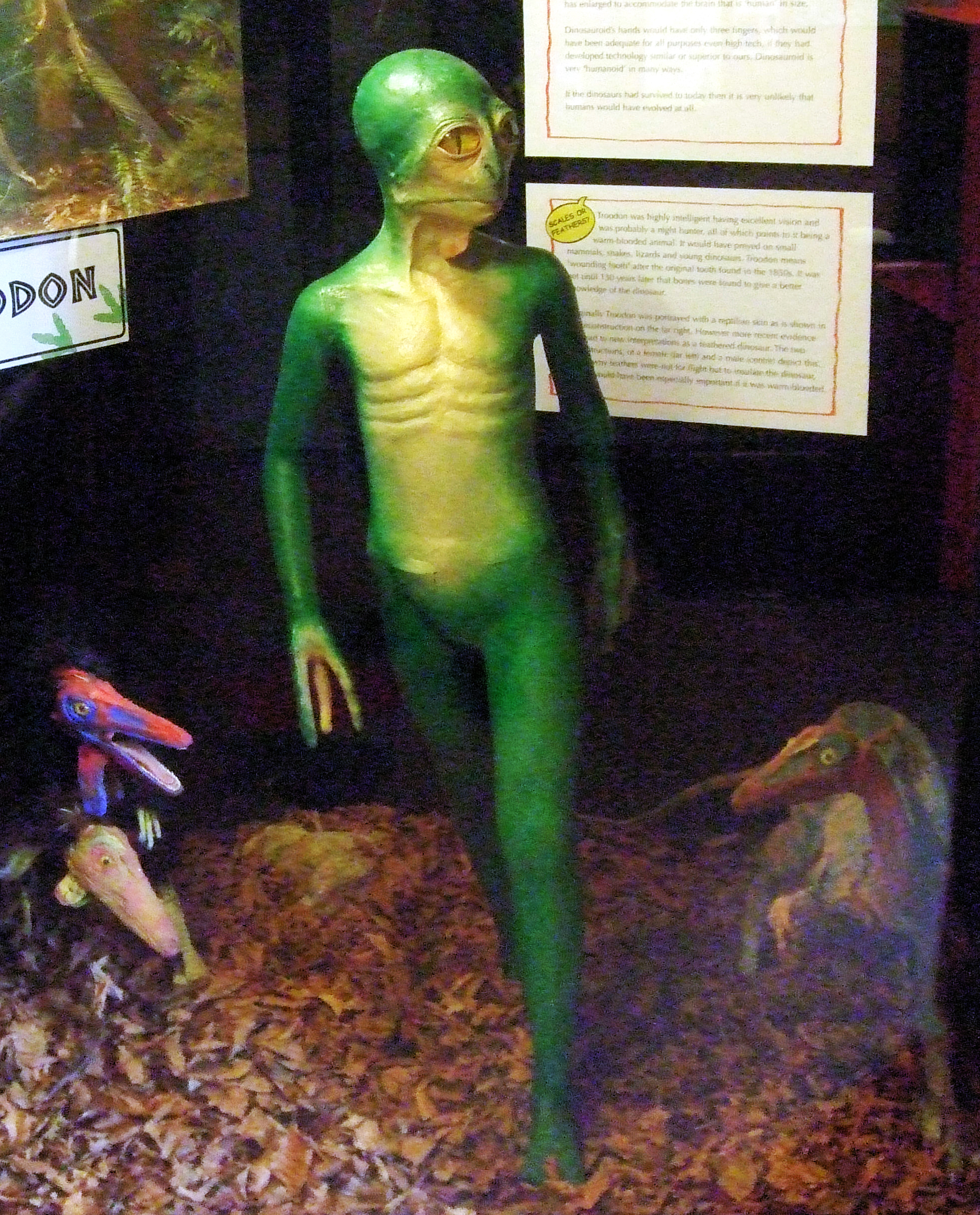
The Dinosauroid, a hypothetical anthropomorphic reptile

Reptilian humanoids, or anthropomorphic reptiles, also called reptiloids, etc., are upright reptilian creatures that appear in folklore, science fiction, fantasy, and conspiracy theories.

== In folklore ==
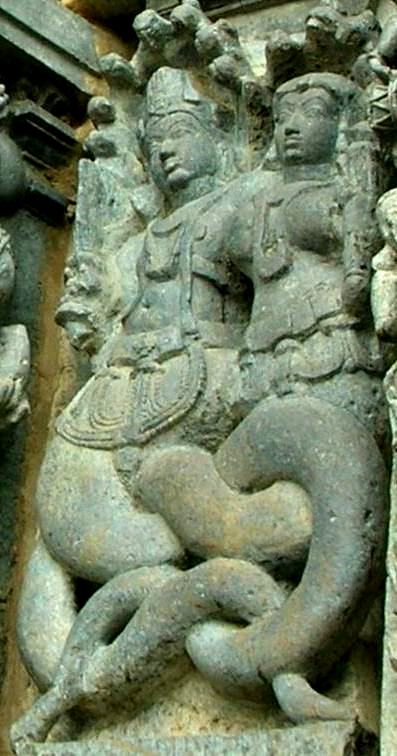
A Nāga couple, featured as a Hoysala relief

In South Asian and Southeast Asian mythology, the Nāga are semi-divine creatures which are half-human and half-snakes.

Claims of sightings of reptilian creatures occur in Southern United States, where swamps are common. In the late 1980s, there were hundreds of supposed sightings of a "Lizard Man" in Bishopville, South Carolina.

== In fiction ==
Anthropomorphic reptilian races or beings commonly appear in fantasy and science fiction. They can be based on various reptiles, like lizards, crocodiles, alligators, snakes, dinosaurs, and the fictional dragons. They are often depicted as powerful warriors, though their relative intelligence to humans varies—as with other anthropomorphic races, a greater resemblance to humans often denotes more "civilized" behavior. Some anthropomorphic reptilians such as lizards and snakes are often associated with jungles, swamps, and other tropical biomes, and as such are seen with cultural elements of similar regions, including Mesoamerican cultures.

=== Fantasy ===
The Serpent Men, reptilian humanoids who can project illusions of human form, appeared as villains throughout Robert E. Howard's King Kull stories starting in 1929 as well as in the linked Cthulhu Mythos. Edgar Rice Burroughs' Pellucidar series featured primitive dinosaur-descended humanoids living in the Hollow Earth called the Horibs or snake-men in his 1929–1930 crossover Tarzan at the Earth's Core. These almost simultaneous inventions originated the modern reptilian humanoid trope. In the 1980s, the animated television series Dino-Riders feature a race called the Rulons, of which some individuals were reptilian humanoids, that served as the main antagonist to the protagonist Valorians upon which the series is based. Merchandise based on the series included several series of toys, among which they included replicas of the reptilian Rulons. One of main sapient races of the Warhammer Fantasy setting are the Lizardmen, Pre-Columbian American-themed creations of super-advanced reptilian aliens called the Old Ones. The Lizardmen, contrary to the name, are not solely based on lizards, but also crocodiles and dinosaurs.

==== Role-playing games ====
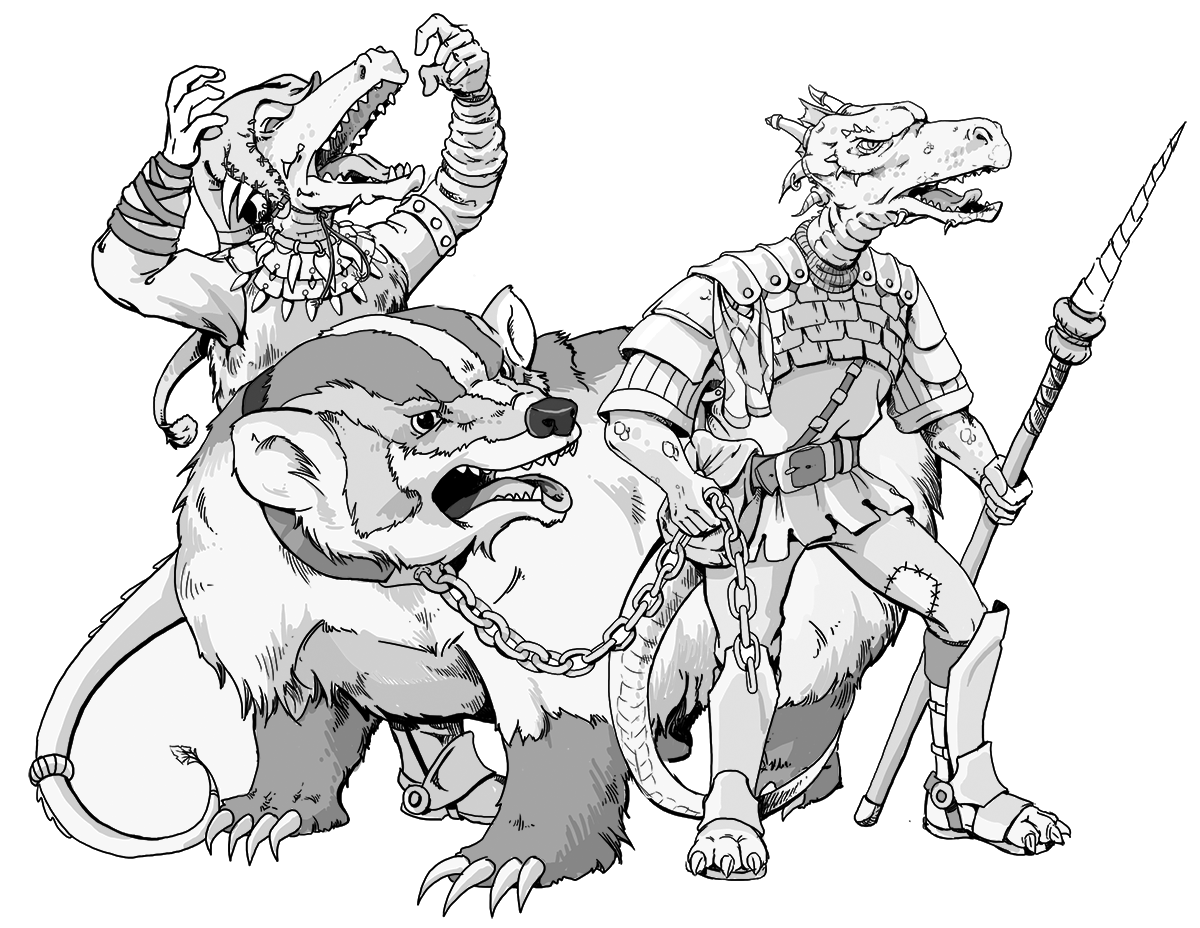
A drawing of kobolds, reptilian humanoid beings that appear in Dungeons & Dragons

Examples of reptilian races in fantasy games are the Lizardmen from Warhammer as well as Lizardfolk, Dragonborn and Kobolds of the Dungeons & Dragons tabletop role-playing game.

The Dragonborn in particular—based on the Draconians of Dragonlance, which in that game were uniformly evil—were originally introduced in the Dungeons & Dragons 3.5 supplement book Races of the Dragon, published by Wizards of the Coast in 2006. In 4th Edition, dragonborn are available as one of the core player character races in the Player's Handbook.

The dragonborn were introduced to the core rules in an attempt to reflect contemporary trends in fantasy fiction and appeal to newer players. In addition, it reflected a perception among the game's designers that it should be possible to play dragon-like creatures in a game with "Dragons" in the title. Richard Baker, who helped design 4th Edition, noted that the introduction of dragonborn to the core rules allowed them to "grow the D&D world by allowing the mix of characters to evolve in the new edition." Jonathan Bolding of The Escapist noted that the inclusion of the dragonborn in the 5th edition Player's Handbook does "push the 'traditional D&D' mold a bit, but this is a greatest hits of D&D player races and powers from the last fifteen years of the game."

Anthropomorphic reptilians are also shown in video games, especially in fantasy games. The lizardlike Argonian race takes a prominent role in the fantasy video game franchise The Elder Scrolls. Other examples of reptilian humanoids in fantasy games are the Man-Serpents from the game Elden Ring and the Naga from World of Warcraft.

=== Science fiction ===
In works of science fiction, aliens are often depicted as closely resembling animals, with reptilian aliens being no exception. An early appearance was in the story "The Lizard-Men of Buh-Lo" (1930) by Francis Flagg. Other examples are the Gorn from Star Trek and the Dracs from the film Enemy Mine (1985).

The television franchise V features the Visitors, a lizardlike alien race who disguise themselves as humans.

The Cardassian race featured in multiple Star Trek series, is another example of reptilian humanoids in that particular science fiction universe. The "Tosk" people, featured on Star Trek: Deep Space Nine, is another. The "Distant Origin" episode of Star Trek: Voyager then features the Voth, a race descended from the dinosaurs that had escaped extinction by leaving Earth and relocating to the Delta Quadrant.

On the television series Doctor Who, there are also races of reptilian humanoids, such as the Silurians and Ice Warriors.

== Conspiracy theory ==
The reptilian conspiracy theory alleges that shape-shifting reptilian aliens control Earth.

Belief in reptilian humanoids can sometimes be traced to antisemitic texts. In one recent example, the perpetrator of the 2020 Nashville bombing subscribed to reptilian conspiracy theories that were influenced by the writings of David Icke, who was in turn influenced by the 1903 antisemitic fabricated text The Protocols of the Elders of Zion.

== See also ==
- List of reptilian humanoids
