= William Rogers House (Bishopville, South Carolina) =

Historic house in South Carolina, United States

- U.S. National Register of Historic Places
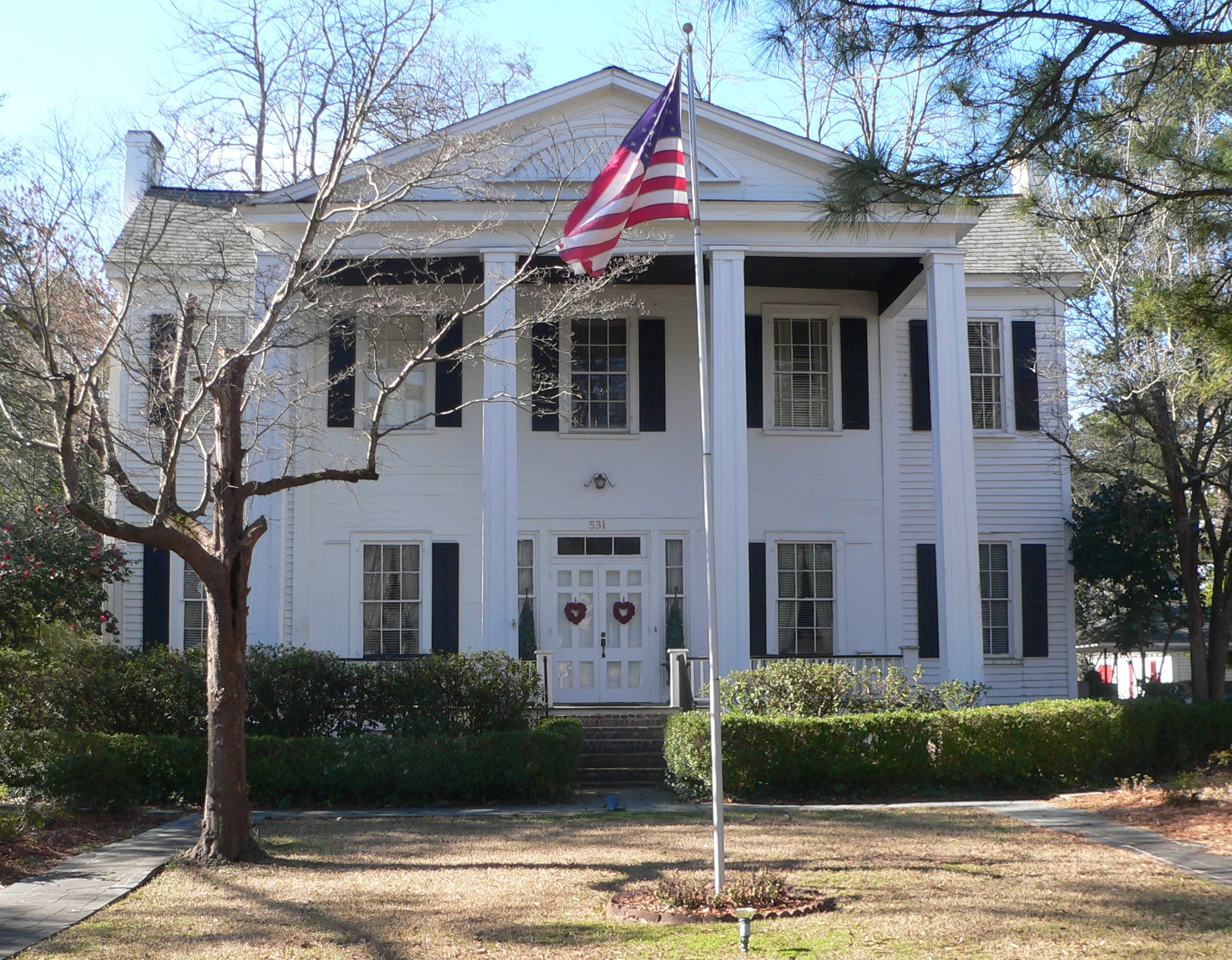
- A flag mounted on a flagpole, February 2013

- Location within South Carolina Location within the United States
- Location: 531 W. Church St., Bishopville, South Carolina
- Coordinates: 34°13′20″N 80°15′16″W
- Area: less than one acre
- Built: c. 1845
- Architectural style: Greek Revival, Vernacular Greek Revival
- MPS: Bishopville MRA
- NRHP reference No.: 86000047
- Added to NRHP: January 9, 1986

William Rogers House, also known as Tindal House, is a historic home located at Bishopville, Lee County, South Carolina. It was built about 1845, and is a two-story, vernacular Greek Revival style house. The front façade features a large two-story pedimented portico. This portico has four large square, frame columns with Doric order capitals. William Rogers' grandson was Thomas G. McLeod, who served as South Carolina's governor from 1923 to 1927. During his childhood McLeod was a frequent visitor to this home.

It was added to the National Register of Historic Places in 1986.
