= Lee County Courthouse (South Carolina) =

- U.S. National Register of Historic Places
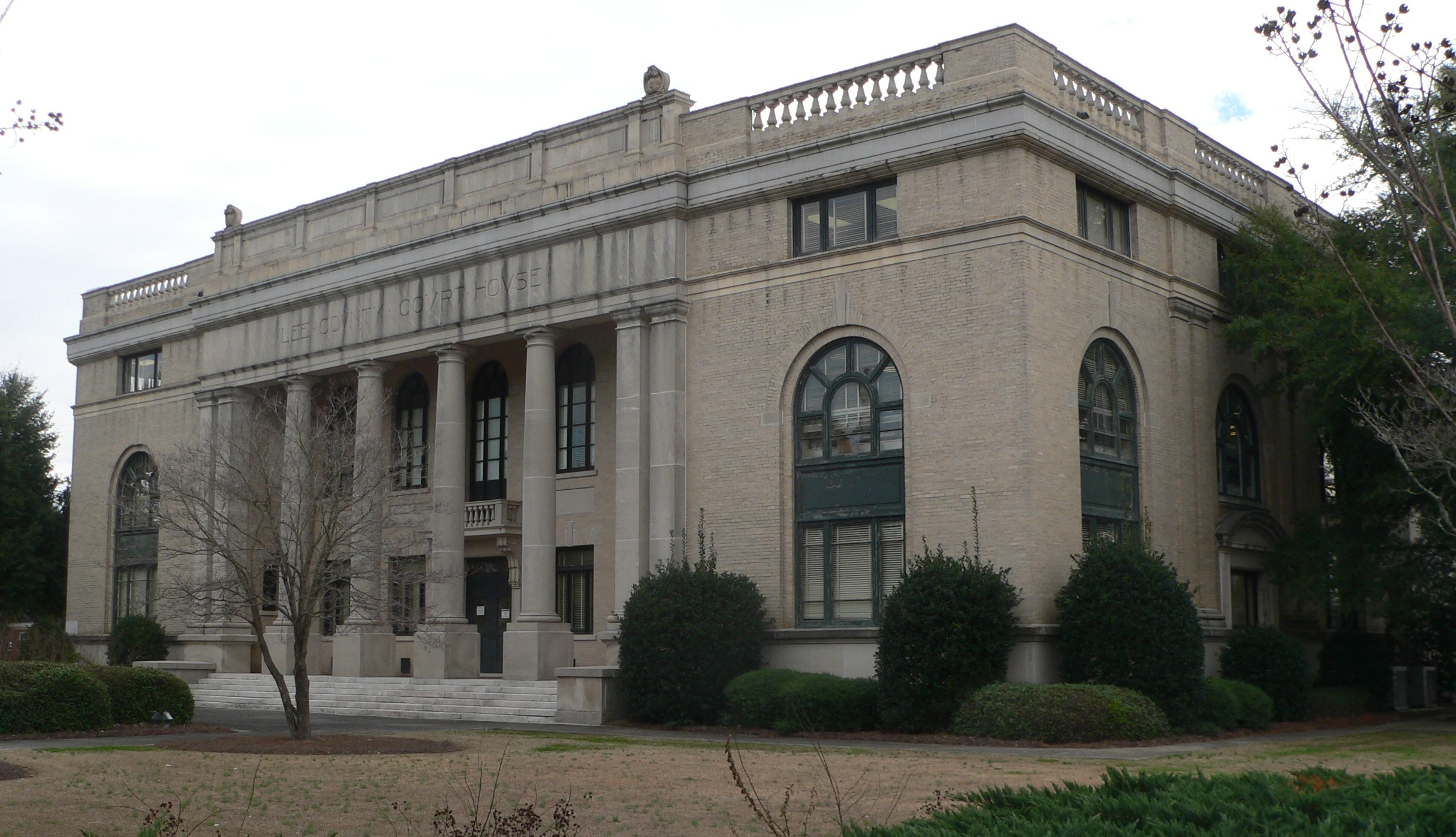
- Courthouse viewed from the west

- Location within South Carolina Location within the United States
- Interactive map showing the location of Lee County Courthouse
- Location: Bishopville, South Carolina
- Coordinates: 34°13′1.6″N 80°14′57.6″W
- Built: 1908
- Architect: William Augustus Edwards
- Architectural style: Classical Revival
- MPS: Courthouses in South Carolina Designed by William Augustus Edwards TR
- NRHP reference No.: 81000568
- Added to NRHP: October 30, 1981

The Lee County Courthouse, built in 1908, is a historic courthouse located at 123 S. Main Street in the city of Bishopville in Lee County, South Carolina. It was designed in the Classical Revival style by Darlington native William Augustus Edwards who designed eight other South Carolina courthouses as well as academic buildings at 12 institutions in Florida, Georgia and South Carolina. Lee County was created in 1902 and this is the only courthouse it has ever had.

On October 30, 1981, it was added to the National Register of Historic Places.

== See also ==
- List of Registered Historic Places in South Carolina
