= Lee State Park =

State park in South Carolina, United States

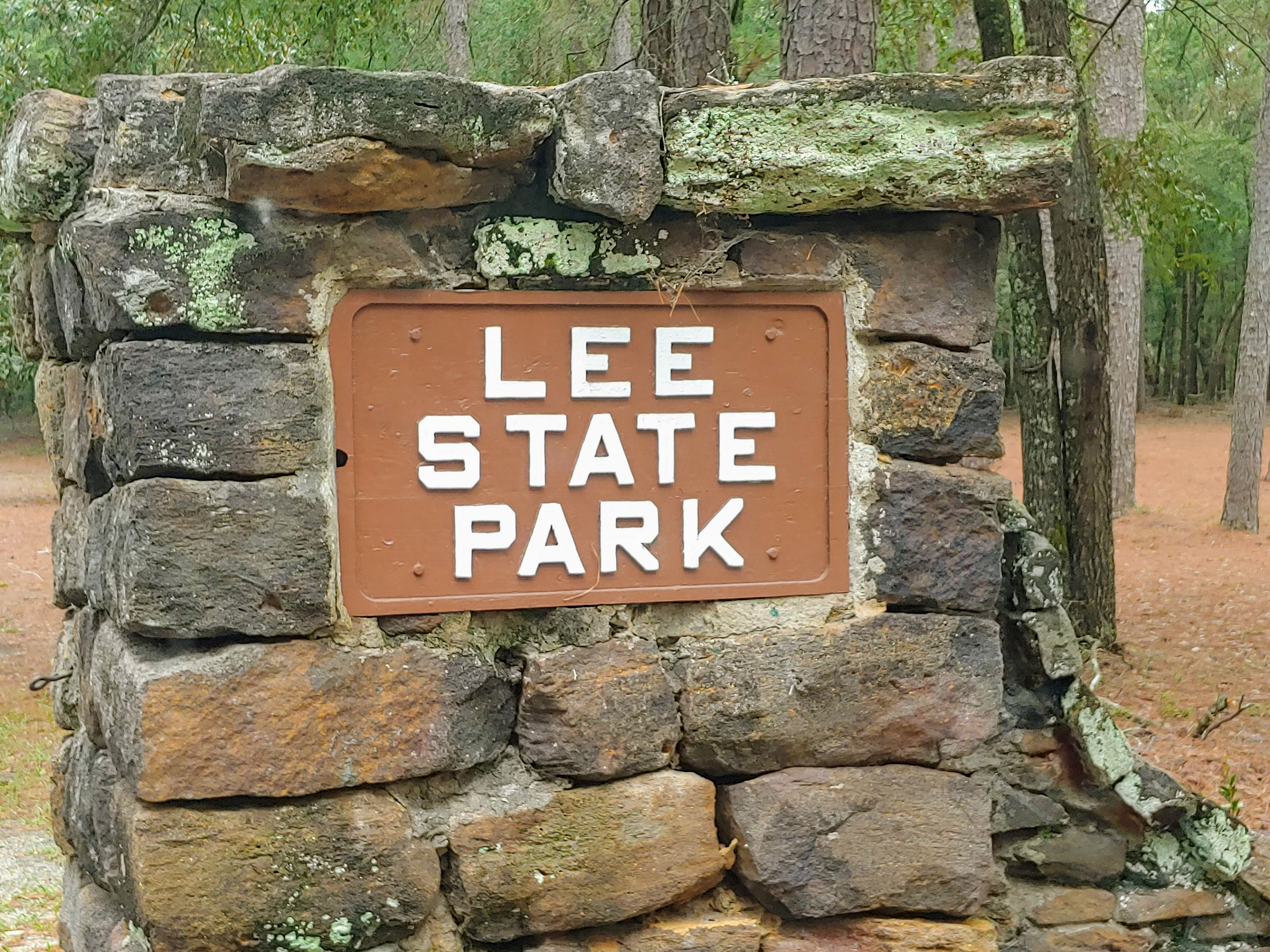
- Interactive map of Lee State Park
- Nearest city: Bishopville, SC
- Coordinates: 34°12′17″N 80°11′44″W
- Area: 2,839 acres (11 km^{2})
- Created: 1935
- Camp sites: tent and RV sites, primitive group camping area, equestrian camping
- Hiking trails: .5 mile long Sandhills and Artesian Trails
- Other information: Nature center

Lee State Park, formerly Lee State Natural Area, is a state park located near the town of Bishopville in Lee County, South Carolina along the Lynches River.

== History ==
The park was one of the 16 in South Carolina developed by the Civilian Conservation Corps during the Great Depression of the 1930s as part of President Franklin D. Roosevelt's New Deal. It sits on the land donated by Lee County. Many of the original buildings are still in use at the park.

Archaeology studies carried out in the park show that it was occupied by American Indians at least five distinct times between 6000 BC and 1000 AD.

== Activities and amenities ==
Activities available at the park include picnicking, biking, fishing, bird watching, geocaching and camping. Children under the age of 14 can fish for catfish from the Artesian Lake. Two half-mile trails are available for hiking.

The park has a number of equestrian facilities including equestrian camping areas, a show ring, stables, and an equestrian group area. There are seven miles of equestrian trails and equestrians are also allowed to ride on the Loop Road which is open to vehicle traffic.

Other Amenities include picnic shelters and a park store.

The Lee Environmental Education Center features a wetland ecology lab and exhibits about the habitats and wildlife of the park.
