= Bishopville, South Carolina =

- Town
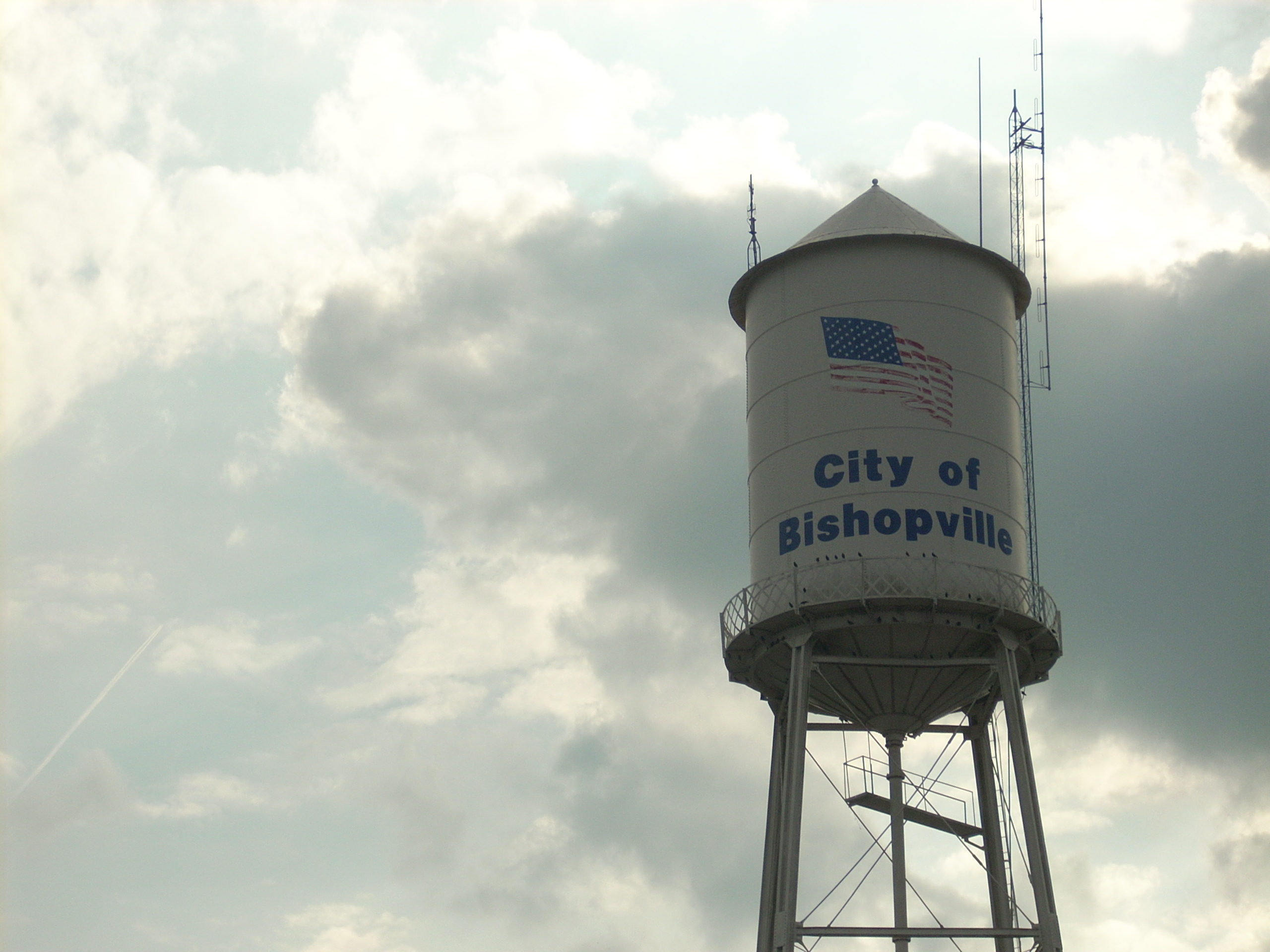
- The water tower in Bishopville

- Seal
- Motto: "Small-Town Hospitality at its Best!"
- Location in Lee County and the state of South Carolina.
- Coordinates: 34°13′14″N 80°15′12″W
- Country: United States
- State: South Carolina
- County: Lee

Area
  - Total: 2.37 sq mi (6.14 km^{2})
  - Land: 2.34 sq mi (6.05 km^{2})
  - Water: 0.031 sq mi (0.08 km^{2})
- Elevation: 226 ft (69 m)

Population (2020)
  - Total: 3,024
  - Density: 1,293.8/sq mi (499.53/km^{2})
- Time zone: UTC−5 (Eastern (EST))
  - Summer (DST): UTC−4 (EDT)
- ZIP Code: 29010
- Area codes: 803, 839
- FIPS code: 45-06310
- GNIS feature ID: 2403869
- Website: cityofbishopvillesc.com

Bishopville is a town in Lee County, South Carolina, United States. The population was 3,471 at the 2010 census. It is the county seat of Lee County.

== Geography ==
Bishopville is located near Lee State Park.

According to the United States Census Bureau, the town has a total area of 2.4 square miles (6.2 km^{2}), of which 2.4 square miles (6.2 km^{2}) is land and 0.04 square miles (0.10 km^{2}) (1.26%) is water.

=== Major highways ===
- I-20
- US 15
- SC 34
- SC 154
- SC 341
- SC 441

=== Climate ===
Bishopville has a humid subtropical climate (Köppen Cfa), with balmy winters and long, hot summers.

Climate data for Bishopville, South Carolina (1991–2020 normals, extremes 1933–present)
Month	Jan	Feb	Mar	Apr	May	Jun	Jul	Aug	Sep	Oct	Nov	Dec	Year
Record high °F (°C)	82 (28)	85 (29)	91 (33)	94 (34)	104 (40)	106 (41)	107 (42)	106 (41)	103 (39)	96 (36)	89 (32)	83 (28)	107 (42)
Mean maximum °F (°C)	74.5 (23.6)	77.0 (25.0)	82.6 (28.1)	87.6 (30.9)	92.1 (33.4)	97.3 (36.3)	98.7 (37.1)	97.4 (36.3)	93.4 (34.1)	86.5 (30.3)	80.5 (26.9)	75.1 (23.9)	99.9 (37.7)
Mean daily maximum °F (°C)	55.4 (13.0)	59.3 (15.2)	66.6 (19.2)	75.4 (24.1)	82.1 (27.8)	88.0 (31.1)	91.5 (33.1)	89.2 (31.8)	84.1 (28.9)	75.5 (24.2)	66.3 (19.1)	58.6 (14.8)	74.3 (23.5)
Daily mean °F (°C)	44.1 (6.7)	47.1 (8.4)	53.7 (12.1)	62.2 (16.8)	70.3 (21.3)	77.4 (25.2)	80.9 (27.2)	79.0 (26.1)	73.6 (23.1)	63.2 (17.3)	53.2 (11.8)	46.8 (8.2)	62.6 (17.0)
Mean daily minimum °F (°C)	32.8 (0.4)	34.9 (1.6)	40.8 (4.9)	49.1 (9.5)	58.5 (14.7)	66.8 (19.3)	70.3 (21.3)	68.9 (20.5)	63.2 (17.3)	50.9 (10.5)	40.0 (4.4)	35.1 (1.7)	50.9 (10.5)
Mean minimum °F (°C)	16.0 (−8.9)	20.1 (−6.6)	24.7 (−4.1)	33.3 (0.7)	44.7 (7.1)	57.7 (14.3)	63.1 (17.3)	60.6 (15.9)	50.5 (10.3)	34.4 (1.3)	24.7 (−4.1)	20.5 (−6.4)	14.6 (−9.7)
Record low °F (°C)	−2 (−19)	6 (−14)	8 (−13)	23 (−5)	31 (−1)	46 (8)	51 (11)	51 (11)	37 (3)	23 (−5)	11 (−12)	3 (−16)	−2 (−19)
Average precipitation inches (mm)	3.76 (96)	3.49 (89)	3.84 (98)	3.01 (76)	3.99 (101)	4.70 (119)	4.53 (115)	4.88 (124)	4.08 (104)	3.46 (88)	3.00 (76)	3.91 (99)	46.65 (1,185)
Average precipitation days (≥ 0.01)	9.1	8.0	8.0	7.6	7.6	9.2	10.5	9.5	7.1	6.5	6.5	7.9	97.5
Source: NOAA

== Demographics ==
Historical population
Census	Pop.	Note	%±
1880	144		—
1890	422		193.1%
1900	715		69.4%
1910	1,659		132.0%
1920	2,090		26.0%
1930	2,249		7.6%
1940	2,995		33.2%
1950	3,076		2.7%
1960	3,586		16.6%
1970	3,404		−5.1%
1980	3,429		0.7%
1990	3,560		3.8%
2000	3,670		3.1%
2010	3,471		−5.4%
2020	3,024		−12.9%
U.S. Decennial Census

=== 2020 census ===
Bishopville racial composition
Race	Num.	Perc.
White (non-Hispanic)	753	24.9%
Black or African American (non-Hispanic)	2,135	70.6%
Native American	4	0.13%
Asian	12	0.4%
Other/Mixed	86	2.84%
Hispanic or Latino	34	1.12%

As of the 2020 United States census, there were 3,024 people, 1,414 households, and 728 families residing in the city.

=== 2000 census ===
As of the census of 2000, there were 3,670 people, 1,438 households, and 907 families residing in the city. The population density was 1,554.8 inhabitants per square mile (600.3/km^{2}). There were 1,616 housing units at an average density of 684.6 per square mile (264.3/km^{2}). The racial makeup of the city was 65.83% African American, 32.83% White, 0.11% Native American, 0.44% Asian, 0.22% from other races, and 0.57% from two or more races. Hispanic or Latino of any race were 1.31% of the population.

There were 1,438 households, out of which 31.6% had children under the age of 18 living with them, 29.8% were married couples living together, 29.6% had a female householder with no husband present, and 36.9% were non-families. Of all households, 34.2% were made up of individuals, and 16.1% had someone living alone who was 65 years of age or older. The average household size was 2.43 and the average family size was 3.12.

In the city, the population was spread out, with 27.2% under the age of 18, 9.3% from 18 to 24, 24.1% from 25 to 44, 19.9% from 45 to 64, and 19.6% who were 65 years of age or older. The median age was 38 years. For every 100 females, there were 78.3 males. For every 100 females age 18 and over, there were 69.0 males.

The median income for a household in the city was $24,400, and the median income for a family was $37,660. Males had a median income of $31,005 versus $18,635 for females. The per capita income for the city was $16,140. About 23.7% of families and 28.8% of the population were below the poverty line, including 42.7% of those under age 18 and 27.3% of those age 65 or over.

In 2010, Bishopville had the 25th-lowest median household income of all places in the United States with a population over 1,000.

== History ==
Bishopville was known as Singleton's Crossroads for more than a decade before it was renamed in honor of Jacques Bishop. The 465 acres (1.88 km^{2}) of land had been granted to Jacob Chamber by the state of South Carolina in 1786. Daniel Carter later purchased the property and then sold it to William Singleton in 1790.

The tavern owned and operated by Singleton and his wife sat at the intersection of Mecklenburg Road, now Church Street, and McCallum Ferry Road, now Main Street. This tavern was a stop on the stagecoach route between Georgetown and Charlotte. (Now this intersection involves Highway 15, which at one point was the premier north–south route from New York to Miami.) In 1798, William Singleton died, leaving his wife the owner of the tavern until her death in 1820. A year later in 1821, the property was sold to Bishop. During this time period, the area around present-day Bishopville was said to be composed of mostly wilderness, with only a few scattered, primitive houses.

Lee County was created in 1892 with Bishopville its county seat, but Bishopville did not complete building its courthouse and county jail until February 1902. As a result, county boundaries were delimited along Lynches River, Black River, Scape Ore Swamp, Sparrow Swamp, Long Branch, and Screeches Branch following old roads and artificial limits.

On December 15, 1902, Bishopville celebrated its new significance by hosting speeches and shooting off the old cannon in front of the Lee County Courthouse.

Lee County has historically been a leader in cotton production in the state and is the home of the South Carolina Cotton Museum.

In addition to the Lee County Courthouse, the Ashwood School Gymnasium and Auditorium, Bishopville Commercial Historic District, James Carnes House, Dennis High School, Thomas Fraser House, William Apollos James House, The Manor, Mt. Zion Presbyterian Church, William Rogers House, South Main Historic District, Spencer House, and Tall Oaks are listed on the National Register of Historic Places.

== Education ==
Students in Bishopville are served by Lee County Public Schools.

=== Public schools ===
- Bishopville Primary School
- Lee Central Middle School
- Lee Central High School
- Lee County Career and Technology Center
- Central Carolina Technical College

=== Private schools ===
- Robert E. Lee Academy
- Pee Dee Math, Science, and Technology Academy

=== Library ===
Bishopville has a lending library, the Lee County Public Library.

== Arts and culture ==
Pearl Fryar's Topiary Garden is located in Bishopville. The 3-acre (12,000 m^{2}) garden is visited annually by many tourists. Fryar and his sculptured topiary garden has been featured many times on television specials and in dozens of magazines. His garden offers 3 acres (12,000 m^{2}) of trees and shrubs formed into fanciful spirals, three-dimensional pieces, pom poms, and other shapes. Fryar is known nationally for live topiary sculptures. He's also won many awards as well as being named as South Carolina Ambassador for Economic Development by Mark Sanford in 2003. Fryar revealed that all he wanted was to have a nice yard and win yard of the month from his hometown of Bishopville, SC.

Lee State Park is one of the best-known parks in Lee County. Located at 487 Loop Road in Bishopville, this park host's just about everything from river fishing, boating, nature trails, show ring, and stables. The park also offers educational programs like pine needle basket weaving and owl prowls. Year-round, during daylight hours, the Civilian Conservation Corps (CCC) workers built the Park during the Great Depression. This attractive park is approximately 2,839 acres (11.49 km^{2}) of land. This park offers picnics in shelters and camping. Picnic tables and serene environments are stationed around the 5.6 miles (9.0 km) of Lynches River that's owned by Lee State Park.

The South Carolina Cotton Museum and Lee County Veterans Museum are located next door to each other in Bishopville. The Cotton Museum preserves the history of cotton culture and the legacy of a way of life both long gone and very much a part of the present. The museum has the world's largest boll weevil. The Lee County Veterans Museum was designed, built and furnished by veterans of Lee County. The museum preserves and tells the history of US wars and conflicts, as well as the stories and lives of local veterans.

=== Monster ===
This town is known for the alleged sightings of a reptile-like monster, known as "The Lizard Man", near a swamp called Scape Ore Swamp. It has supposedly frightened people and damaged some cars. At one point there was a one million dollar reward for anyone who could find and present "Lizard Man".

== Notable people ==
- Doc Blanchard, first Junior to win college football's Heisman Trophy award
- Gwendolyn Bradley, opera singer
- The Button King, born Dalton Stevens
- James C. Capers Jr., former United States Marine Corps officer and Medal of Honor recipient
- Silas DeMary, a player for the Cleveland Gladiators
- Pearl Fryar, noted topiary artist
- Tommy Gainey, professional golfer on the PGA Tour
- Jim Nesbitt, comic country musician
- Drink Small, the "Blues Doctor", an African American soul blues singer

== See also ==
Lizard Man of Scape Ore Swamp
