= Lee County, South Carolina =

County in South Carolina, United States

- County
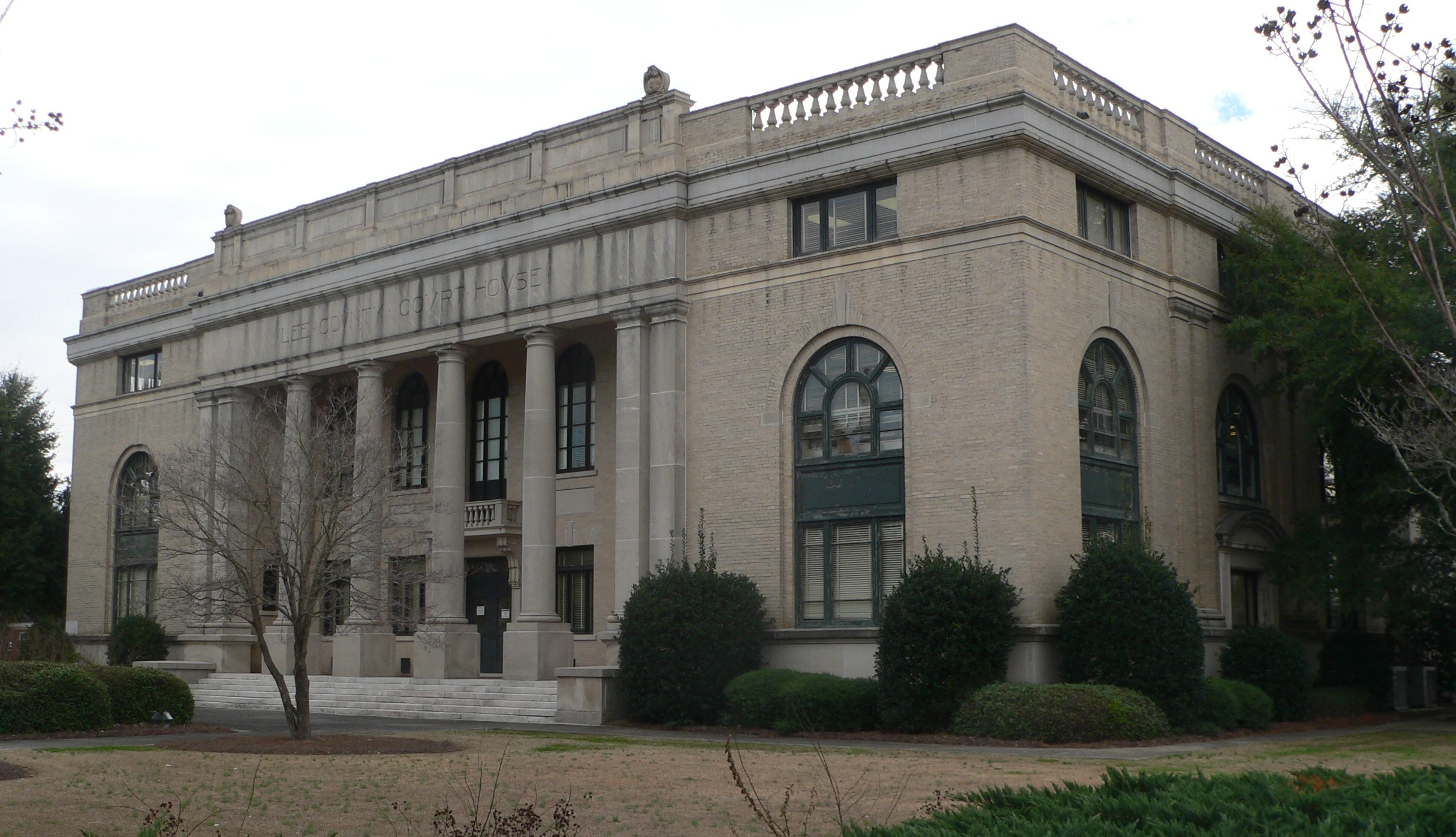
- Lee County Courthouse

- Seal
- Motto: "Experience The Beauty of Lee County"
- Location within the U.S. state of South Carolina
- Interactive map of Lee County, South Carolina
- Coordinates: 34.16°N 80.25°W
- Country: United States
- State: South Carolina
- Founded: December 15, 1902
- Named for: Robert E. Lee
- Seat: Bishopville
- Largest community: Bishopville

Area
  - Total: 411.23 sq mi (1,065.1 km^{2})
  - Land: 410.18 sq mi (1,062.4 km^{2})
  - Water: 1.05 sq mi (2.7 km^{2}) 0.26%

Population (2020)
  - Total: 16,531
  - Estimate (2025): 15,730 ▼
  - Density: 40.302/sq mi (15.561/km^{2})
- Time zone: UTC−5 (Eastern)
  - Summer (DST): UTC−4 (EDT)
- Congressional district: 5th
- Website: www.leecountysc.org

Lee County is a county located in the U.S. state of South Carolina. As of the 2020 census, its population was 16,531, making it the fifth-least populous county in South Carolina. Its county seat is Bishopville.

== History ==
The county is named for Confederate general Robert E. Lee. A previous incarnation of Lee County was established in 1898, but was negated by the State Supreme Court in 1899. The current Lee County formed on February 25, 1902, from Darlington, Kershaw, and Sumter counties. Minor boundary changes were made in 1914 (11.9 sq mi [31 km^{2}] to Sumter), in 1921 (4.24 sq mi [11.0 km^{2}] to Kershaw), and in 1925 (1.58 sq mi [4.1 km^{2}] from Kershaw).

== Geography ==
According to the U.S. Census Bureau, the county has a total area of 411.23 square miles (1,065.1 km^{2}), of which 410.18 square miles (1,062.4 km^{2}) is land and 1.05 square miles (2.7 km^{2}) (0.26%) is water.

=== State and local protected areas ===
- Lee State Natural Area
- Longleaf Pine Heritage Preserve/Wildlife Management Area
- Lynchburg Savanna Heritage Preserve/Wildlife Management Area
- Mary McLeod Bethune Birthplace

=== Major water bodies ===
- Black River
- Lynches River

=== Adjacent counties ===
- Darlington County - northeast
- Florence County - east
- Sumter County - south
- Kershaw County - northwest

=== Major highways ===
- I-20
- US 15
- US 76
- US 401
- SC 34
- SC 154
- SC 341
- SC 441

== Demographics ==
Historical population
Census	Pop.	Note	%±
1910	25,318		—
1920	26,827		6.0%
1930	24,096		−10.2%
1940	24,908		3.4%
1950	23,173		−7.0%
1960	21,832		−5.8%
1970	18,323		−16.1%
1980	18,929		3.3%
1990	18,437		−2.6%
2000	20,119		9.1%
2010	19,220		−4.5%
2020	16,531		−14.0%
2025 (est.)	15,730	▼	−4.8%
U.S. Decennial Census; 1790–1960 1900–1990; 1990–2000 2010 2020

=== Racial and ethnic composition ===
Lee County, South Carolina – Racial and ethnic composition Note: the US Census treats Hispanic/Latino as an ethnic category. This table excludes Latinos from the racial categories and assigns them to a separate category. Hispanics/Latinos may be of any race.
Race / Ethnicity (NH = Non-Hispanic)	Pop 1980	Pop 1990	Pop 2000	Pop 2010	Pop 2020	% 1980	% 1990	% 2000	% 2010	% 2020
White alone (NH)	7,295	6,839	6,961	6,322	5,721	38.54%	37.09%	34.60%	32.89%	34.61%
Black or African American alone (NH)	11,356	11,481	12,736	12,315	10,054	59.99%	62.27%	63.30%	64.07%	60.82%
Native American or Alaska Native alone (NH)	12	17	27	49	49	0.06%	0.09%	0.13%	0.25%	0.30%
Asian alone (NH)	10	25	36	58	34	0.05%	0.14%	0.18%	0.30%	0.21%
Native Hawaiian or Pacific Islander alone (NH)	x	x	1	3	0	x	x	0.00%	0.02%	0.00%
Other race alone (NH)	1	0	7	6	15	0.01%	0.00%	0.03%	0.03%	0.09%
Mixed race or Multiracial (NH)	x	x	87	133	363	x	x	0.43%	0.69%	2.20%
Hispanic or Latino (any race)	255	75	264	334	295	1.35%	0.41%	1.31%	1.74%	1.78%
Total	18,929	18,437	20,119	19,220	16,531	100.00%	100.00%	100.00%	100.00%	100.00%

=== 2020 census ===
As of the 2020 census, there were 16,531 people, 6,536 households, and 3,971 families residing in the county. The median age was 45.7 years; 17.8% of residents were under the age of 18 and 21.4% were 65 years of age or older. For every 100 females there were 103.9 males, and for every 100 females age 18 and over there were 103.2 males.

The racial makeup of the county was 34.9% White, 61.0% Black or African American, 0.3% American Indian and Alaska Native, 0.2% Asian, 0.0% Native Hawaiian and Pacific Islander, 1.0% from some other race, and 2.5% from two or more races. Hispanic or Latino residents of any race comprised 1.8% of the population.

0.0% of residents lived in urban areas, while 100.0% lived in rural areas.

There were 6,536 households in the county, of which 25.9% had children under the age of 18 living with them and 39.5% had a female householder with no spouse or partner present. About 34.2% of all households were made up of individuals and 17.0% had someone living alone who was 65 years of age or older.

There were 7,549 housing units, of which 13.4% were vacant. Among occupied housing units, 71.3% were owner-occupied and 28.7% were renter-occupied. The homeowner vacancy rate was 1.2% and the rental vacancy rate was 5.0%.

=== 2010 census ===
At the 2010 census, there were 19,220 people, 6,797 households, and 4,567 families living in the county. The population density was 46.9 inhabitants per square mile (18.1/km^{2}). There were 7,775 housing units at an average density of 19.0 per square mile (7.3/km^{2}). The racial makeup of the county was 64.3% black or African American, 33.4% white, 0.3% Asian, 0.3% American Indian, 0.8% from other races, and 0.9% from two or more races. Those of Hispanic or Latino origin made up 1.7% of the population. In terms of ancestry, 24.9% were American, and 5.1% were English.

Of the 6,797 households, 32.7% had children under the age of 18 living with them, 37.5% were married couples living together, 24.0% had a female householder with no husband present, 32.8% were non-families, and 29.3% of households were made up of individuals. The average household size was 2.54 and the average family size was 3.15. The median age was 38.9 years.

The median household income was $23,378 and the median family income was $35,279. Males had a median income of $32,721 versus $26,769 for females. The per capita income for the county was $12,924. About 25.8% of families and 29.9% of the population were below the poverty line, including 40.9% of those under age 18 and 16.7% of those age 65 or over.

=== 2000 census ===
At the 2000 census, there were 20,119 people, 6,886 households, and 4,916 families living in the county. The population density was 49 people per square mile (19 people/km^{2}). There were 7,670 housing units at an average density of 19 per square mile (7.3/km^{2}). The racial makeup of the county was 63.56% Black or African American, 35.03% White, 0.13% Native American, 0.19% Asian, 0.59% from other races, and 0.49% from two or more races. 1.31% of the population were Hispanic or Latino of any race. Of the 6,886 households 32.70% had children under the age of 18 living with them, 43.00% were married couples living together, 23.80% had a female householder with no husband present, and 28.60% were non-families. 25.90% of households were one person and 10.60% were one person aged 65 or older. The average household size was 2.68 and the average family size was 3.23.

The age distribution was 25.80% under the age of 18, 10.00% from 18 to 24, 29.20% from 25 to 44, 22.60% from 45 to 64, and 12.40% 65 or older. The median age was 36 years. For every 100 females there were 101.40 males. For every 100 females age 18 and over, there were 101.10 males.

The median household income was $26,907 and the median family income was $34,209. Males had a median income of $26,512 versus $18,993 for females. The per capita income for the county was $13,896. About 17.70% of families and 21.80% of the population were below the poverty line, including 25.60% of those under age 18 and 27.90% of those age 65 or over.

== Law and government ==
=== Law enforcement ===
In 2010, Lee County Sheriff Edgar Jerome “E.J.” Melvin and six others were arrested on federal drug conspiracy charges. Court documents stated that he dealt cocaine from his police SUV, and other dealers gave him the nickname "Big Dog." Melvin was found guilty and sentenced to 17 years in prison.

=== Politics ===
Lee County has been a Democratic stronghold since 1972, peaking in 2012 when Barack Obama claimed over two-thirds of the county's vote. Lee did see a shift toward the Republican party in 2024, which would prove to be the closest election in the county since 1988.

United States presidential election results for Lee County, South Carolina
Year	Republican		Democratic		Third party(ies)	
Year	No.	%	No.	%	No.	%
1904	18	1.57%	1,128	98.43%	0	0.00%
1908	58	5.67%	963	94.13%	2	0.20%
1912	3	0.52%	571	98.45%	6	1.03%
1916	14	1.74%	779	96.65%	13	1.61%
1920	18	2.39%	734	97.35%	2	0.27%
1928	6	1.00%	593	99.00%	0	0.00%
1932	10	1.33%	742	98.67%	0	0.00%
1936	5	0.48%	1,045	99.52%	0	0.00%
1940	20	2.37%	825	97.63%	0	0.00%
1944	50	5.71%	764	87.31%	61	6.97%
1948	36	2.70%	142	10.65%	1,155	86.65%
1952	1,669	64.29%	927	35.71%	0	0.00%
1956	250	10.14%	943	38.26%	1,272	51.60%
1960	1,297	46.59%	1,487	53.41%	0	0.00%
1964	2,489	68.29%	1,156	31.71%	0	0.00%
1968	1,219	22.23%	2,151	39.23%	2,113	38.54%
1972	3,076	60.31%	1,996	39.14%	28	0.55%
1976	2,357	37.69%	3,869	61.86%	28	0.45%
1980	2,952	37.48%	4,818	61.17%	107	1.36%
1984	3,548	47.31%	3,912	52.16%	40	0.53%
1988	2,936	46.17%	3,423	53.83%	0	0.00%
1992	2,730	34.90%	4,454	56.94%	638	8.16%
1996	1,973	33.40%	3,588	60.73%	347	5.87%
2000	2,675	40.27%	3,899	58.70%	68	1.02%
2004	2,901	36.73%	4,960	62.80%	37	0.47%
2008	3,074	33.58%	5,960	65.12%	119	1.30%
2012	2,832	31.80%	5,977	67.10%	98	1.10%
2016	2,803	34.37%	5,199	63.74%	154	1.89%
2020	3,008	35.68%	5,329	63.21%	94	1.11%
2024	3,078	38.11%	4,505	55.78%	493	6.10%

== Economy ==
In 2022, the GDP was $425.5 million (about $26,648 per capita), and the real GDP was $345 million (about $21,607 per capita) in chained 2017 dollars.

As of April 2024, some of the largest employers in the county include Ardagh Group, Coca-Cola Consolidated, Food Lion and Lee Academy.

Employment and Wage Statistics by Industry in Lee County, South Carolina - Q3 2023
Industry	Employment Counts	Employment Percentage (%)	Average Annual Wage ($)
Accommodation and Food Services	250	7.0	17,524
Administrative and Support and Waste Management and Remediation Services	261	7.3	42,588
Agriculture, Forestry, Fishing and Hunting	78	2.2	29,588
Construction	50	1.4	36,660
Educational Services	366	10.2	39,000
Finance and Insurance	65	1.8	47,112
Health Care and Social Assistance	635	17.8	60,372
Information	23	0.6	91,416
Manufacturing	406	11.4	67,132
Professional, Scientific, and Technical Services	120	3.4	58,032
Public Administration	568	15.9	49,556
Real Estate and Rental and Leasing	6	0.2	26,520
Retail Trade	463	13.0	26,156
Transportation and Warehousing	173	4.8	53,924
Wholesale Trade	108	3.0	62,608
Total	3,572	100.0%	47,072

== Communities ==
=== Towns ===
- Bishopville (county seat and largest community)
- Lynchburg

=== Census-designated places ===
- Ashwood
- Browntown
- Elliott
- Manville
- St. Charles
- Wisacky

=== Other unincorporated communities ===
- Alcot
- Lucknow
- Spring Hill
- Una

== See also ==
- List of counties in South Carolina
- National Register of Historic Places listings in Lee County, South Carolina
- List of memorials to Robert E. Lee
- Lizard Man of Scape Ore Swamp
- John Andrew Jackson
