= Directory for public worship =

Directory for public worship may refer to:

- The Westminster Directory of Public Worship of 1644
- The Church of Scotland's Book of Common Order
- The Presbyterian Church (U.S.A.)'s Book of Order
