= Gradye Parsons =

Gradye Parsons is an American retired Presbyterian minister and church leader who served as the Stated Clerk of the General Assembly of the Presbyterian Church (U.S.A.) from 2008 to 2016. As Stated Clerk, Parsons was the denomination's top ecclesiastical officer, tasked with providing guidance on constitutional matters, overseeing denominational governance, and representing the PC(USA) denomination in its relationships with other Christian bodies and religious organizations.

Parsons succeeded Clifton Kirkpatrick as Stated Clerk and led the church through a period of significant change, including debates on LGBTQ+ inclusion, same-sex marriage, and the divestment from fossil fuels and certain companies involved in the Israeli-Palestinian conflict. He was a strong advocate for unity, mission, and justice within the church, consistently emphasizing the importance of engaging with contemporary social and theological challenges while remaining rooted in Reformed traditions.

Prior to his role as Stated Clerk, Parsons served as a pastor, presbytery executive, and in other leadership capacities within the denomination. Since his retirement, Parsons has continued to be active in the church and broader religious community, contributing to discussions on faith, leadership, and social justice.
