= Church of the Pilgrims (Washington, D.C.) =

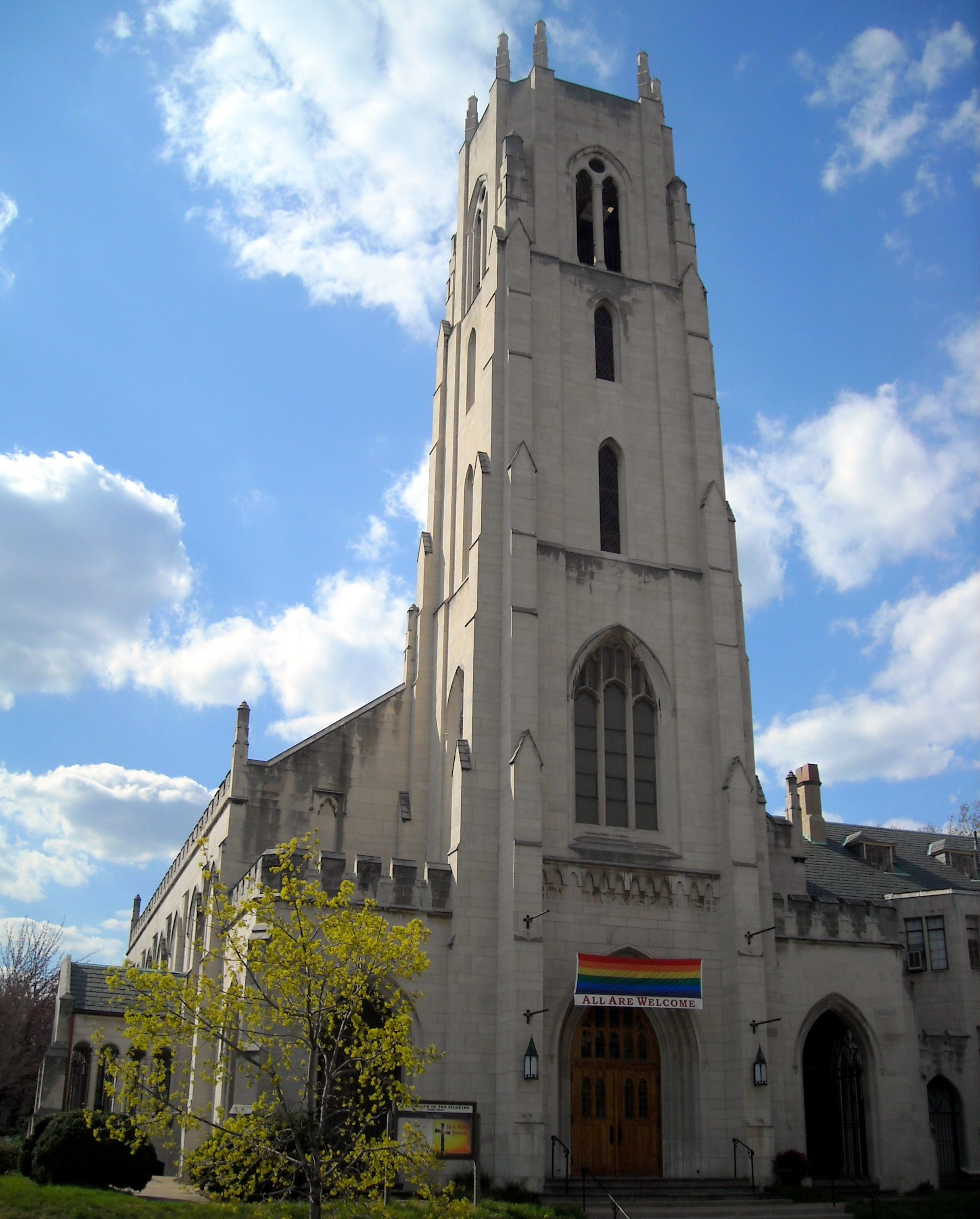

- Location within District of Columbia
- 38°54′37.1″N 77°2′57.4″W
- Location: 2201 P Street NW, Washington, D.C.
- Country: United States
- Denomination: Presbyterian Church (USA)
- Website: www.churchofthepilgrims.org

History
- Status: Active
- Founded: 1903

Architecture
- Architect: Benjamin C. Flournoy
- Style: Late English Gothic Revival
- Completed: 1929

The Church of the Pilgrims is a Presbyterian Church (USA) congregation located in Washington, D.C., in the United States. The congregation was founded in 1903 as the Second Southern Presbyterian Church and took its current name in 1919. The congregation resides in a Gothic Revival church located at 22nd Street NW and P Street NW. The building was designed by architect Benjamin C. Flournoy of Baltimore, Maryland, and completed in March 1929.

== History ==
=== Formation and first pastor ===
The congregation got its start about September 1902. Several residents of the city sent a petition to the Virginia synod of the Presbyterian Church in the United States (commonly described as the Southern Presbyterian Church), asking them to send an evangelist to the city for the purpose of organizing a new congregation. The synod agreed, and The Reverend B. F. Bedinger was sent to the city about November 1, 1902. Within a week, he had organized about 40 members into a body of like-minded worshippers. The group began meeting and worshipping together in December 1902, and the congregation formally organized on January 25, 1903, as the Second Presbyterian Church South (a.k.a. Second Presbyterian Church). Bedinger served as the first pastor, Dr. Otho M. Muncster and E. H. Cumpston as the first elders, and Dr. George DuBose, James J. Royster, and William S. Feland the first deacons. There were 43 members of the congregation, and 18 members of the Sunday School. The congregation first worshipped in a house located at 2145 P Street NW.

Bedinger stayed with the church for seven months before leaving. Left without a pastor, the congregation dwindled to 26. On January 31, 1904, Rev. Harry Waddell Pratt, an energetic pastor in his 30s, accepted the call to be the congregation's first permanent pastor. The congregation grew swiftly, and by September 1904 had purchased land on 22nd Street NW between P and Q Streets for a permanent church home. Ground for the new structure was broken on October 24, 1904, and the cornerstone laid on November 24. The congregation occupied the new church on January 1, 1905, with 82 members of the congregation in attendance.

=== Second pastor and building addition ===
Pratt resigned in the fall of 1910 to take a position as pastor of a Southern Presbyterian Church congregation in Abbeville, South Carolina. His replacement was Reverend Andrew Reid Bird, D.D., a 31-year-old from Baltimore, Maryland. Bird was formally installed on March 6, 1911.

In 1913, President Woodrow Wilson, himself the son of a Southern Presbyterian Church minister, began worshipping occasionally at Church of the Pilgrims. (Note: Wilson was actually a member of Central Presbyterian Church, located at 3047 15th Street NW. The congregation dissolved and the church closed its doors on December 31, 1972.) Wilson became a close friend of Bird's, and the two spent many days golfing together.

By 1917, the Second Presbyterian Church South congregation had outgrown its existing structure. With World War I raging, the church had no money or materials to build with, and construction workers were all assigned to war production industries. To obtain building materials, Bird asked his congregation to donate their manual labor to the expansion effort. Men of the congregation demolished a building at 5th Street NW and New York Avenue NW for free; in exchange, the owner donated second-hand building materials to the church for construction of an addition. The addition was built in 1918 by Bird, men from the congregation, and a local Boy Scouts of America troop. With the addition, the church could now seat 200 people at a time.

In 1919, Bird convinced the congregation to change its name to Church of the Pilgrims. The new name was first used in December 1919.

=== New building ===
With the congregation having grown significantly under both Pratt and Bird, Bird began traveling extensively throughout the Deep South to raise funds for a new church building. The response was enthusiastic. The nine-year fundraising campaign culminated in 1927, with more than $200,000 ($3,700,000 in 2025 dollars) in donations from congregations throughout the Deep South. The church used a portion of the funds to purchase a large lot just south of its existing structure. Architect Benjamin C. Flournoy, of the Baltimore firm of Flournoy and Flournoy, was hired to design the structure.

Flournoy designed a complex that included a church, a Sunday School building, and a parsonage. Each structure was three stories high, and contained a basement. The basement of the church contained a social hall and meeting rooms (with one room specifically set aside for use by the Boy Scouts). The basement of the school building housed a bowling alley. The three structures were arranged to mimic the layout of a medieval abbey, and resemble Late English Gothic architecture. The church building had a single tower, and the parsonage was in the rear. The brick, concrete, and stone structure had was 192 feet (59 m) long on 22nd Street NW, and extended 150 feet (46 m) back from the street. It was expected to have a seating capacity of 1,000.

Ground was broken for the new building on June 25, 1927. By April 1928, the cost of the building had risen to $250,000 ($4,700,000 in 2025 dollars), and by late May 1928 to $300,000 ($5,600,000 in 2025 dollars). A new fund-raising effort was begun to raise the needed extra funds. Among the donations raised at this time was a pledge by Sarah Ecker Watts Morrison, wife of Governor Cameron A. Morrison of North Carolina, to donate a $20,000 ($400,000 in 2025 dollars) pipe organ to the finished church. The Rev. Dr. John B. Frazier, a Southern Presbyterian minister and former chief chaplain in the United States Navy, conducted much of this fundraising, emphasizing that the Church of the Pilgrims was going to be a gift to the nation from the Southern Presbyterian Church.

Construction began in May 1928, with the George A. Fuller Co. conducting the work. By July 1928, the cost of the completed structure was $400,000 ($75,000,000 in 2025 dollars). Bird repeatedly called for members of the church to donate their manual labor in constructing the edifice. On July 30, 1928, Bird and other members of the congregation actually dug a trench for the foundation of an arch on the property. Seating in the church was scaled back to 750, the building capable of adding mezzanine seating for another 250. The cornerstone of the new church was laid on October 13, 1928, by Frazier.

The new Church of the Pilgrims held its first service at 11 a.m. on Easter Sunday, March 31, 1929. Clad in Rockwood limestone from Colbert County, Alabama, the church's pews were inscribed with names of congregations making donations to the church. The final cost of the complex was $400,000 ($7,500,000 in 2025 dollars).

The church itself was dedicated in May 1929. The organ, Skinner Organ Co. Opus 744, was installed in late May or early June 1929.

Bird retired as pastor of Church of the Pilgrims in 1956, and died three years later.

== Beliefs ==
=== Marriage ===
The church has an inclusive vision and celebrates both opposite-sex marriages and same-sex marriages.
