= Woods Memorial Presbyterian Church =

Church in Severna Park, Maryland

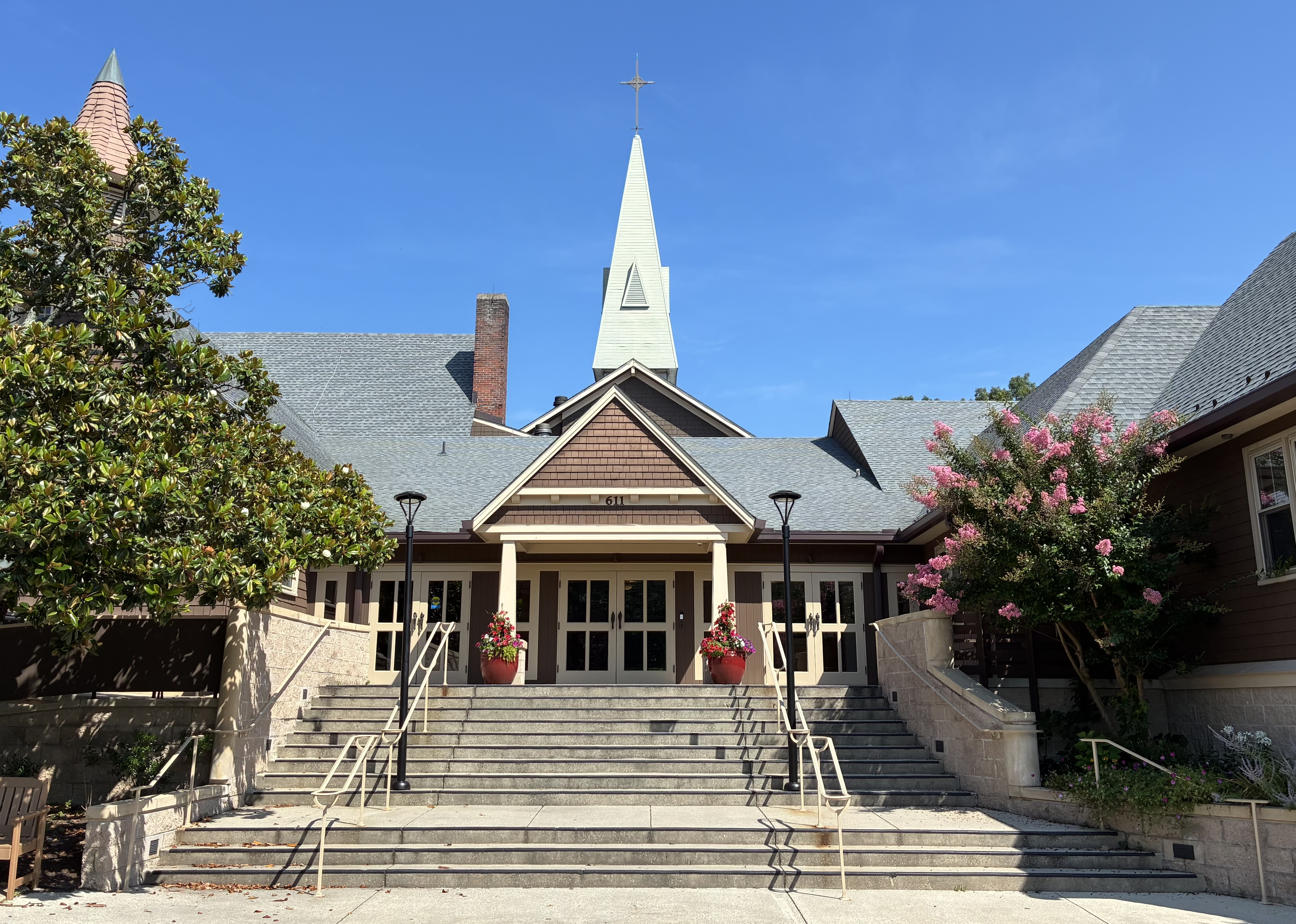
- Front of the church
- Woods Memorial Presbyterian Church
- 39°4′18″N 76°32′41″W
- Location: 611 Baltimore Annapolis Blvd; Severna Park, Maryland 21146
- Country: United States
- Denomination: Presbyterian Church (USA)
- Website: www.woodschurch.org

History
- Former name: Severna Park Presbyterian Church
- Founded: June 23, 1912
- Founder: Frank Churchill Woods

Clergy
- Pastor: Rev. Nancy Lincoln-Reynolds

Woods Memorial Presbyterian Church, formerly known as the Severna Park Presbyterian Church, was established in 1912 in Severna Park, Maryland. With more than 1,200 members, it is the largest congregation in the Baltimore Presbytery.

== History ==
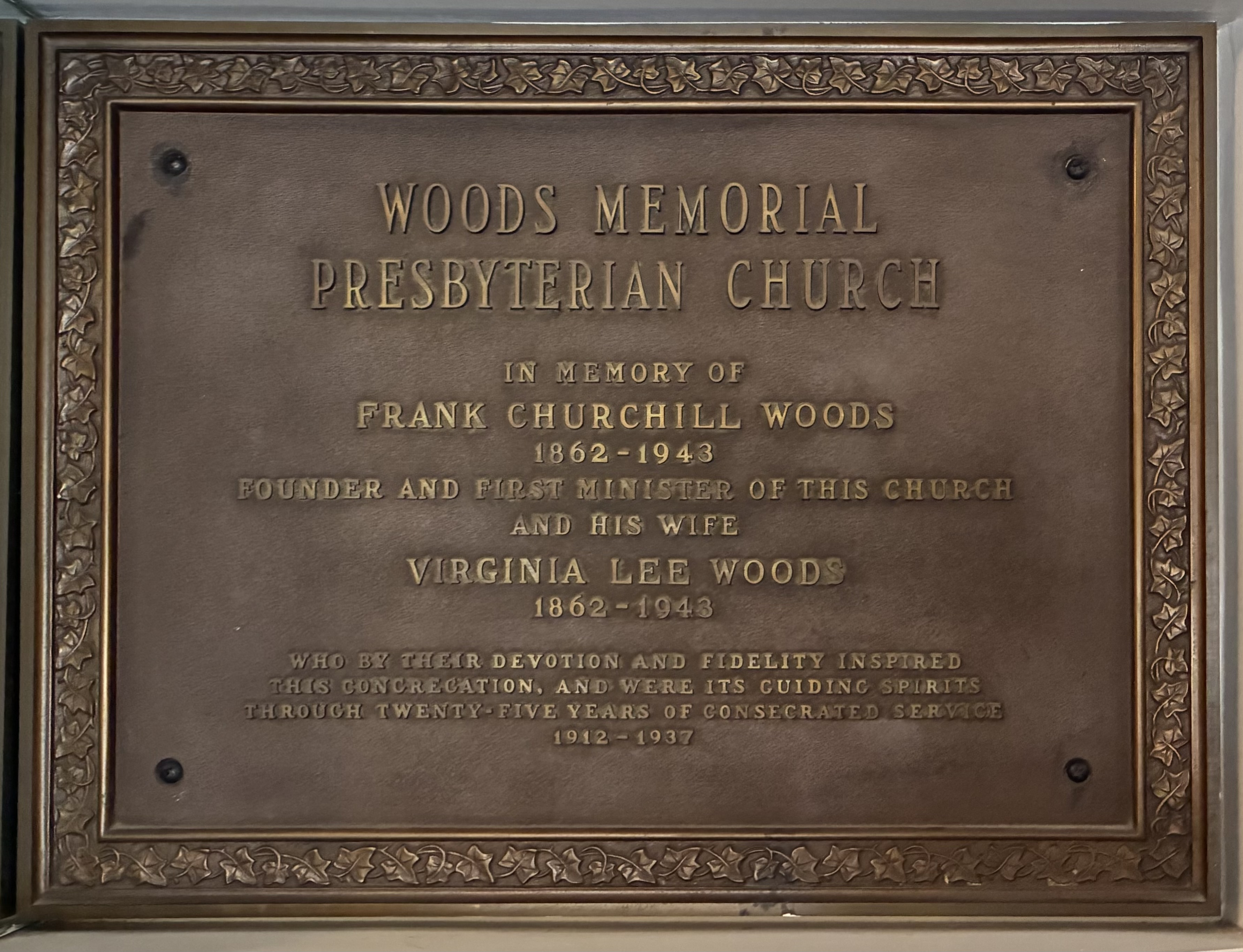
Memorial plaque within the church

Woods Church was founded by eight organizing members in 1912. The pastor served the first six months without pay. The first church services were held in the local public elementary school. The first church building was financed with the help of a grant from the Baltimore Presbytery and a loan from the General Assembly through their new church development agencies. It was twenty-five years before the church reached a membership of about 150. The church was originally named Severna Park Presbyterian Church, but its name was altered in honor of founder and first pastor Rev. Frank Churchill Woods after his death in 1943.

== Church building ==
Woods is built on a 4-acre campus and hosts a church building and pre-school. The church also hosts an art gallery which shows work from local and national artists.

Woods is a Presbyterian Church (USA) Earth Care Congregation. In 2021, they were one of the five winners of the national Interfaith Power & Light (IPL) Cool Congregations Challenge.

== Global outreach ==
=== Meadowbrook Church in Jamaica ===
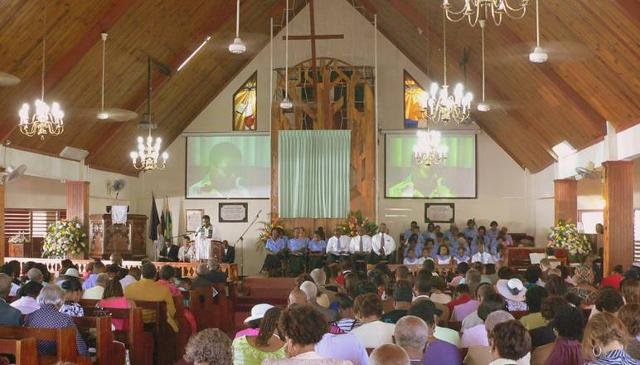
Meadowbrook United Church in Jamaica

One of the church's most significant outreach activities has been its relationship with the Meadowbrook United Church of Kingston, Jamaica. This relationship began in 1984 and church members took part in mission visits in 1985 and 1986. In 1986, Raymond Coke, the minister of Meadowbrook Church, proposed that the two churches develop a joint mission relationship after a visit to Woods. This led to an exchange of pulpits for a month in 1987. After further visits by members of both congregations, agreements were reached on Woods' support of education and dental programs run by Meadowbrook.

Woods maintains this relationship with Meadowbrook as its sister church.
