= The Fellowship Community =

The Fellowship Community, formerly known as the Fellowship of Presbyterians (FOP), arose from a movement started by seven pastors from some of the largest PC(USA) churches in the United States in 2010. The movement gained momentum when they met in August 2011 at a planning and organizational meeting in Minneapolis, Minnesota and began drafting essential tenets and refined polity for a new reformed body. A second gathering of the movement in January 2012 resulted in a new denomination known as Covenant Order of Evangelical Presbyterians (ECO). The Fellowship Community maintains that it is committed to remaining in the PC(USA) and "is not a waiting room for departure". It remains true, though, that many congregations leaving the PC(USA) have had a connection to The Fellowship Community and that The Fellowship Community strategizes with congregations seeking dismissal from the PC(USA). Jim Singleton, one time president of The Fellowship Community wrote, "We are now in a time when many congregations feel the need to withdraw…"

In June 2014, the FOP parted ways structurally with ECO and shortly thereafter, joined with Presbyterians for Renewal (PFR) to work with conservative and evangelical congregations and individuals in the PCUSA. (In 1989, the Covenant Fellowship of Presbyterians and Presbyterians United for Biblical Concerns merged to form Presbyterians for Renewal (PFR)—a broad based advocacy and ministry organization.) In August 2014, the FOP and PFR began re-branding to become known as The Fellowship Community. The two groups fully merged in January, 2015. Presently, the Fellowship Community has approximately 183 member congregations within the PC(USA).
