= Clifton Kirkpatrick =

Clifton Kirkpatrick is the former Stated Clerk of the General Assembly of the Presbyterian Church (U.S.A.), a position in which he served from 1996 to 2008. From 2004, he served as President of the World Alliance of Reformed Churches. In this role, Kirkpatrick worked to strengthen the alliance's commitment to justice, peace, and ecumenical collaboration, particularly addressing issues such as economic injustice, climate change, and global poverty.

During his term as Stated Clerk of the PC(USA), Kirkpatrick advocated for the ordination of gays and lesbians. After serving the denomination through twelve years of declining membership, Kirkpatrick chose to step down from his position.
