= Book of Order =

The Book of Order is a governing document of the Presbyterian Church (U.S.A.), abbreviated as PC(USA). It is divided into four parts: The Foundations of Presbyterian Polity, Form of Government, Directory for Worship, and Rules of Discipline. The Book of Order is designated "Part 2" of the PC(USA) Constitution. "Part 1" is the Book of Confessions.

== Organization ==
The four parts of the Book of Order are abbreviated by the use of capital letters:

- F - Foundations
- G – Form of Government
- W – Directory for Worship
- D – Rules of Discipline

Chapters and sections in each part of the Book of Order are represented by decimal numbers in the form (0.0000). For example, "Full Inclusion", which describes the inclusion of all types of people in Christian worship, is found in G-4.0304. This means that Form of Government, Chapter 4, section .0300, part .0004 contains the section "Full Inclusion".

== Foundations of Presbyterian Polity ==
The Foundations of Presbyterian Polity describes the basic principles behind the presbyterian polity of PC(USA).

== Form of Government ==
The Form of Government provides a basic framework of government for the four levels of PC(USA) Councils: Sessions (of congregations), Presbyteries, Synods and the General Assembly.

== Directory for Worship ==
The Directory for Worship includes the theological guidelines for worship within PC(USA) churches. In order to allow for a diversity of expression in worship, the Directory does not provide set orders for worship, but instead suggests the boundaries of worship that is in line with Reformed Christianity and the Scriptural warrants for worship. It is concerned more with standards and norms than any particular way or formulation of a liturgy or order of worship. Liturgical texts are found in a separate Liturgical book of the Presbyterian Church (U.S.A.).

== Rules of Discipline ==
The Rules of Discipline provide the standards for church discipline concerning matters that the secular judicial system does not address. The Rules of Discipline concerns itself with matters of preserving the purity of the church, achieving justice and compassion for all participants involved, correcting or restraining wrongdoing, upholding the dignity of those who have been harmed by disciplinary offenses, restoring the unity of the church by removing the causes of discord and division, and securing the just, speedy, and economical determination of proceedings.

== See also ==
- Book of Common Order
- Directory of Public Worship
- Westminster Assembly
