= Fort Washington Presbyterian Church =

Church in Manhattan, New York

- U.S. National Register of Historic Places
- U.S. Historic district – Contributing property
- New York State Register of Historic Places
- New York City Landmark
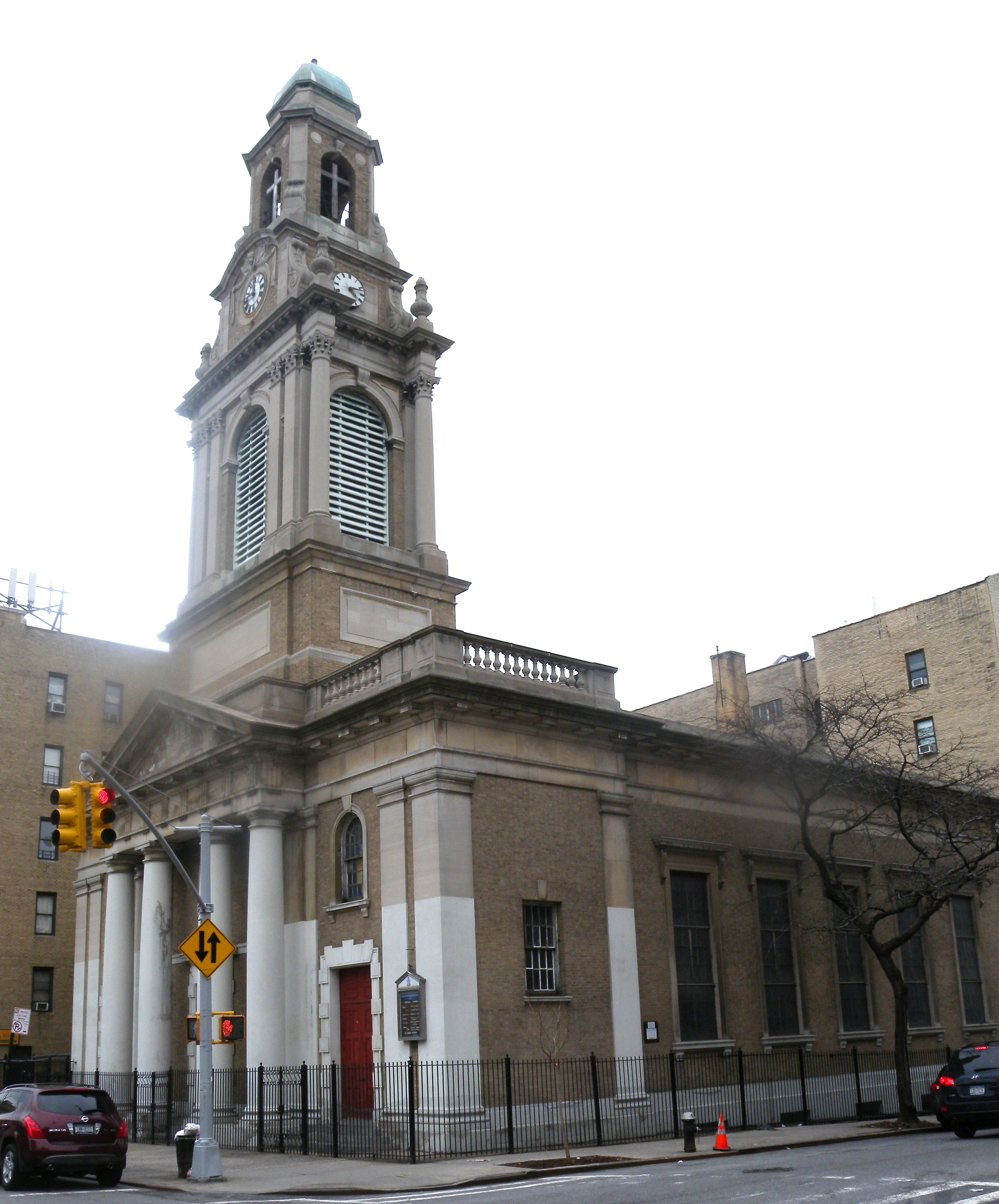

- Location within New York City Location within New York Location within the United States
- Location: 21 Wadsworth Ave., New York, New York
- Coordinates: 40°50′43.35″N 73°56′16.24″W
- Area: less than one acre
- Built: 1913
- Architect: Hastings, Thomas; Wills, C.T., Inc.
- Architectural style: Georgian Revival
- Part of: Dominican Historic District (ID100011048)
- NRHP reference No.: 09001209
- NYSRHP No.: 06101.013329
- NYCL No.: 2337

Significant dates
- Added to NRHP: January 7, 2010
- Designated CP: January 24, 2025
- Designated NYSRHP: November 2, 2009
- Designated NYCL: May 12, 2009

Fort Washington Presbyterian Church, also known as Iglesia Presbiteriana Fort Washington Heights, is a historic Presbyterian church complex located in Washington Heights, Manhattan, New York City. The complex consists of a long rectangular three-by-seven-bay church with an attached Sunday school wing. It was designed by architect Thomas Hastings (1860–1929) and built between 1913 and 1914 in the Georgian Revival style. The church is a 2-story, plus basement, gable-roofed building with a monumental temple front elevation. It features a prominent five stage bell tower.

The church was designated a New York City Landmark May 12, 2009. It was listed on the National Register of Historic Places in 2010.
