= Jewish existentialism =

Jewish theology

Jewish existentialism is a category of work by Jewish authors dealing with existentialist themes and concepts (e.g., the debate about the existence of God and the meaning of human existence), intended to answer theological questions that are important in Judaism. The existential angst of Job is an example from the Hebrew Bible of the existentialist theme. Theodicy and post-Holocaust theology comprise much of 20th-century Jewish existentialism.

Examples of Jewish thinkers and philosophers whose works include existentialist themes are Martin Buber, Joseph B. Soloveitchik, Lev Shestov, Benjamin Fondane, Franz Kafka, Franz Rosenzweig, Hans Jonas, Emmanuel Levinas, Hannah Arendt, Rabbi Abraham Joshua Heschel, and Emil Fackenheim.

== Precursors ==
Jewish existentialism finds its roots in both the traditional philosophical school of existentialism and the peculiarities of Jewish theology, Biblical commentary, and European Jewish culture. Existentialism as a philosophical system grew as a result of the works of such non-Jewish thinkers as Søren Kierkegaard, Friedrich Nietzsche, Albert Camus, and Martin Heidegger.

The Books of Ecclesiastes and Job, found in the Hebrew Bible and often cited as examples of wisdom literature in the Hebrew Biblical tradition, both include existentialist themes. The Book of Job tells the story of Job, who is beset by both God and Satan by many hardships intended to test his faith. He ultimately keeps his faith and receives redemption and rewards from God. The Book of Job includes many discussions between Job and his friends and between Job and God concerning the nature, origin, and purpose of evil and suffering in the world. The Book of Ecclesiastes is broader in scope and includes many meditations on the meaning of life and God's purpose for human beings on Earth. Passages in Ecclesiastes describe human existence in such terms as "all is futile" and "futile and pursuit of wind". Much Biblical scholarship and Talmud exegesis has been devoted to exploring the apparent contradiction between the affirmation of an all-powerful God's existence and the futility, meaningless, and/or difficulty of human life. Judaism's treatment of theodicy makes heavy use of the Books of Job and Ecclesiastes.

Some of the trends in the modern philosophy of existentialism come from concepts important to early Rabbinic and pre-Rabbinic Judaism. William Barret's Irrational Man, which traces the history of existentialist thought in the Western world, explains how the competing worldviews of Greco-Roman culture and Jewish culture have helped shape modern existentialism. Barrett says that the Jewish concept of the "man of faith" is one "who is passionately committed to his own being". The Jewish "man of faith", Barrett says, trusts in a God who can only know through "experience" and not "reasoning". Juxtaposed with the believing Jew is the skeptical Greek "man of reason" who seeks to attain God through "rational abstraction". The Greek invention of logic and the tradition of rational philosophical inquiry contributed to existentialism. The Greeks invented philosophy as an academic discipline and as a way to approach the problems of existence, eventually resulting in the philosophical works of Nietzsche, Heidegger, Sartre, Kierkegaard and other existentialists. Jewish thought trends had much more influence on the important concepts of existentialism. Much of modern existentialism may be seen as more Jewish than Greek.

Several core concepts found in Jewish tradition that are often cited as the most important concepts explored by existentialism, include, for example, the "uneasiness" "deep within Biblical man", his "sinfulness", and his "feebleness and finiteness". While "the whole impulse of philosophy for Plato arises from an ardent search for escape from the evils of the world and the curse of time", Judaism recognizes the impossibility of trying to transcend the world entirely via intellectualism, lofty thoughts, and ideals. As the late Jewish existentialist Rabbi Joseph B. Soloveitchik (1903–1993) articulates for a popular audience of secular Jews,

"The idea of holiness according to halakhic [Jewish law] world view does not signify a transcendent realm completely separate and removed from reality...of the supreme good...the halakhic conception of holiness...[is] the holiness of the concrete."

In the words of Barret, "right conduct is the ultimate concern of the Hebrew", and indeed for the observant Jew, according to Soloveitchik. Therefore, the Jewish tradition is differentiated from the Greek system of thought, which emphasizes correct knowledge, thinking, and consciousness as the passports to the transcendence of the physical world. Some traditions of ancient Gnosticism, like the neo-Platonist desert cults, also subscribed to an idea similar to the Platonist ideal of "true knowledge of the Good" being a gateway to transcending one's ordinary, physical existence.

== General existentialism and Jewish existentialism ==
The philosophical school known as existentialism is generally regarded to have begun with the writings of the Danish Søren Kierkegaard (1813 – 1855). Other important thinkers include the German Friedrich Nietzsche (1844 – 1900), the French Jean-Paul Sartre (1905 – 1980), and the German Martin Heidegger (1889 – 1976). Various Jewish existentialists found influence in the secular philosophy of existentialism and have made a range of critiques and commentaries of the above-mentioned writers' works.

Both Judaism and existentialism deny the ability of human beings to permanently transcend the physical world and one's own everyday existence. Theistic Judaism insists on a transcendent realm of existence beyond everyday human reality, that is, the realm of God. As a way of connecting to God, Judaism directs its adherents towards the strict observance of laws, both ritual and ethical, to add meaning to the adherents' lives (see Soloveitchik's Halakhic Man for a further discussion of the concept of the Jew making meaning in his own life by observing the Halakha). Modern existentialist philosophy often denies the existence of a higher power, leading some to classify it as an agnostic or atheistic thought structure. Heidegger posited that the discomfort caused by one's thrownness into existence, which is similar to what he says is the Jewish conception of "uneasiness" with being inherently sinful as a created being. Both senses of being ill-at-ease in one's skin are too inherent to the human condition to eliminate, according to Barret. Traditional Jewish and, more broadly, existentialist thinkers—both Jewish and non-Jewish—have different solutions to this intrinsic uneasiness—also called existential anxiety or existential angst.

Jean-Paul Sartre's book Anti-Semite and Jew (1948) is a direct connection between secular existentialist thought-as-philosophy and Jewish existentialism as an expression of a religious mode of thinking. Sartre's humanistic argument against antisemitism is that,

"If reason exists, there is no French or German truth...or Jewish truth. There is only one Truth, and he is best who wins it. In the face of universal and eternal laws, man himself is universal. There are no more Poles or Jews; there are men who live in Poland, others who are designated as 'of the Jewish faith' or their family papers..."

Even out of the ashes of the Holocaust, Sartre insists on the supremacy and ultimate victory of rationalism over tribalism and hatred. The antisemite's hatred is a misguided attempt to rid one's society of evil, which is itself a noble aim. Sartre ties his existentialist, universal humanism to Judaism by denying the difference between Jews and others. By denying Jews the theological claim to Chosenness and explaining the Holocaust as a particularly nasty episode of utopianism gone wrong, Sartre attempts to offer hope to Jews worldwide. He insists that tribalism and pure hatred of Jews as 'aberrant outsiders' is not a source of antisemitism. He claims that "If the Jew did not exist, the antisemite would invent him." Antisemitism is, in Sartre's philosophy, much more a reflection of the basic psychological need for a foreign object of hatred common in many people, including himself. In many cases, the object of hatred for non-Jews has been the Jewish people, which has functioned as the "scapegoat" of Europe for millennia.

== History ==
=== 20th century (Pre-WWII) boom ===
==== Martin Buber ====
Perhaps the preeminent Jewish existentialist is the Austrian theologian/philosopher Martin Buber. Buber wrote extensively on a variety of topics, including Biblical translation, Zionism, Hassidic culture, folklore and his concept of "a philosophy of dialogue". He made a major contribution to Jewish existentialism with his popular 1923 book I and Thou (from the German, Ich und Du). The book is concerned with the dual concepts of the "I and You (Thou)" and "I and It" relationship, which is Buber's attempt to answer several age-old existential questions about the meaning of human existence. Buber says that human beings find meaning in their relationships with other entities in the world, whether these are inanimate objects, other people, or even a spiritual force like God. This Begegnung ("meeting") between human and object is what gives life meaning for each individual human. Buber goes on to show how human beings define themselves in relation to the other, either the "You" or the "I." He says that one's whole being is made by the relation one has to "The Other" – "When one says You, the I of the word pair I-You is said, too...Being I and saying I are the same." And also, "The world as experience belongs to the basic word I-It. The basic word I-You establishes the world of relation."

The latter parts of Buber's I and Thou are concerned with the possibility for unity of all being. Buber takes a leaf from the book of Judeo-Christian mysticism and Buddhism and explores the concept of the unity of all beings in the universe. Buber admits that as a practicality, and for purposes of life in the real world, "In lived actuality there is not unity of being." Because of Buber's concept of the human being having his existence justified by each new interaction with an 'I' or 'Thou' object, his preferred brand of theology can be seen "not as pantheism, but as panentheism: not that everything is God, but that God may be in everything..."

Buber wrote on a wide variety of topics. He wrote commentary on the socialist Zionist movement, classic gentile existentialist writers such as Kierkegaard, Dostoyevsky, and Nietzsche, and Hassidic folklore and culture, among many other topics from a variety of disciplines. In addition to all this, his concepts of the "I and Thou" dialectic and his "philosophy of dialogue" have become standard reading in the realm of positivist existentialist philosophy that seeks to bring meaning to human life. Ronald Gregor Smith writes, "The authentic Jewish note of existential 'realization' is never hard to detect." Buber had an ultimately optimistic view of people's ability to find meaning in life through the Jewish religion.

==== Franz Rosenzweig ====
Franz Rosenzweig was a contemporary, colleague, and close friend of Martin Buber. The two co-wrote a variety of works, including a translation of the Hebrew Bible from the original Hebrew. Rosenzweig's best-known individual work is the epic The Star of Redemption, a book of modern theology critical of modern philosophical idealism (embodied in Hegel's systematization of human life and thought structure) which has had a massive influence on modern Jewish theology and philosophy since its publication in the early 20th century. Rosenzweig proposes an alternative to modern philosophy's systematization of human existence in a paradigm shift from a sterile, removed modern philosophy of idealism and logic to a more Jewish, theistic system, emphasizing the primacy of the relationships between the world, Man (as human being), and God.

==== Hans Jonas ====
Hans Jonas was a Jewish scholar of religion and philosophy best known for his definitive work on ancient Gnosticism. His books and papers on Gnosticism and "philosophical biology" are considered an important part of early 20th century scholarship on these subjects.

=== Theodicy and post-Holocaust theology ===
The next phase of Jewish existentialism includes a variety of works addressing the horrors of the Holocaust, the term used to denote the German Nazi party's state-engineered genocide of approximately 6 million European Jews and approximately 11 million other 'undesirables' (including homosexuals, Romani, the mentally and physically disabled, and Slavic peoples) during World War II.

The paradox of theodicy has been of interest to theologians and philosophers (Jewish and gentile) for centuries. Theodicy, or the problem of evil, is a branch of theology/philosophy which explores the perceived contradiction of the existence of evil in the world with an all-good, all-knowing, all-powerful (omniscient and omnipotent) God. Talmudists and mystics in the rabbinic tradition explained evil as an absence or distance from God, rather than the opposite of God's all-powerful goodness. Examples include Job complaining to his friends about God causing him suffering, Maimonides' explanation of evil and suffering being the result of man's actions against God rather than God's actions or ill-will towards man, and Spinoza's emphasis on the impersonal nature of the universe and the efficacy of human reason in avoiding evil and suffering. Generations of pre-Holocaust Jewish scholars came up with explanations for the existence of both evil and an all-powerful, all-good, and infallible God in the universe.

These convenient logical arguments could not provide sufficient solace for a Jewish people emerging from the horrors of the Holocaust. Many scholars contend that the enormous tragedy of the Holocaust represents an entirely new category of evil that one could not explain with traditional Jewish theology. The preeminent survivor-novelist Elie Wiesel (1928-2016) raises a variety of unanswerable questions about the Holocaust in his novels, such as the best-selling Night (1958). Many Jews, whether they were survivors or not, experienced a loss of faith in the Jewish concept of God and even in the power of human goodness. Wiesel often repeats the sentiment that "God died in Auschwitz", which may be an allusion to Nietzsche's famous contention that "God is dead", and is representative of the theme of loss of meaning in life for a generation of Jews who experienced and witnessed the Holocaust. However, some Jewish theologians have come up with responses to the Holocaust without denying the existence of God entirely.

==== Emil Fackenheim ====
Emil L. Fackenheim was a Reform-movement Rabbi and well-known Jewish theologian who wrote on post-Holocaust theology and coined the term "the 614th commandment". For Fackenheim, Judaism "attempts to supersede the Holocaust" by founding the State of Israel. The creation of the State of Israel by Jews committed to the renewal of Judaism and the welfare of their fellow Jews and 'the Jewish nation' represents for Fackenheim the emergence of a "muscular Judaism" not present in other generations of Jews.

Fackenheim's best-known work is To Mend the World: Foundations of Future Jewish Theology (1982). In it, he coined the term "the 614 commandment" (which he also called the "commanding Voice of Auschwitz"), "forbidding the post-Holocaust Jew to give Hitler post-humous victories". Fackenheim encountered some criticism for his contention that it is worthwhile to maintain one's Jewish identity solely for the purpose of making sure that Hitler's genocidal plans are not fulfilled after Germany's defeat in World War II.

==== Richard Rubenstein ====
Richard Rubenstein is a Jewish theologian whose work on Holocaust theology is considered foundational to the subject. His basic thesis in his most famous work, After Auschwitz: History, Theology, and Contemporary Judaism (1966) is that the Jewish conception of God must change in the post-Holocaust era. According to Rubenstein, Jews can no longer believe in an all-powerful, all-good, and omnipotent God; the contradiction inherent in such a God allowing the Holocaust to occur is too great. Rubenstein writes about "God's guilt" for allowing the Holocaust to happen. He affirms God's all-powerful nature, but suggests the possibility that God is not the all-good force of love that rabbinic Judaism has made him out to be. Rather, God may be an all-powerful enemy of the Jewish people, who has damned them to an eternal "Chosenness" of suffering.

Rubenstein also discusses in After Auschwitz the significant role that Christianity and various Christian churches (for example, the massive and politically powerful institution of the German Catholic church) had in allowing the Holocaust to occur. Rubenstein makes the point that it was not just the political and social trends of Nazism that allowed the Holocaust to occur; German Christians endorsed Hitler's aims both passively and actively.

== Traditional Jewish responses ==
Along with the work of secular, agnostic theologians concerned with the national destiny of the Jewish people, there has been a resurgence of religious Jewish thought since the 1950s. Some of the work of observant Jewish scholars is concerned with existentialist themes.

=== Abraham Joshua Heschel ===
Abraham Joshua Heschel wrote extensively on Jewish existentialist themes. Among his many works on Jewish theology are the books The Sabbath (1951) and Who is Man? (1965). The best-selling The Sabbath explores the concept of the Jewish Sabbath (Shabbat) and its significance as a period of heightened connection between God and his creation of Man. Heschel's The Sabbath is also well known for the concept of the Shabbat as a "cathedral in time" (rather than in space, as cathedrals are in the Christian tradition). For Heschel, "The Sabbath arrives in the world... [and] eternity utters a day."

In Who is Man?, Heschel explicates his thesis that Man is a being whose ultimate purpose and task in life is to wonder about existence, to ponder and pine for his Creator. In his words, "Man is a being in search of significant being, of ultimate meaning of existence." In Who Is Man?, Heschel also constructs a famous dichotomy between "biblical man" and "ontological man". Heschel's concept of the "ontological man" is an explicit response to Heidegger's ideas about Dasein, which for Heschel is a human who merely exists passively, rather than lives actively as human in the world. A further difference between "biblical" and "ontological" man is that "ontological" man is stuck on basic questions of ontology (the study of the nature of being and existence) and only "seeks to relate the human being to transcendence called being" whereas the "biblical man" "realizing that human being is more than being...seeks to relate man to a divine living, to a transcendence called the living God". Heschel critiques Heidegger's stance toward seeking an understanding of Being as the ultimate reality without reaching out to a higher power while at the same time living actively in the real world (as "biblical man" does), saying,

"...simply to 'surrender to being,' as Heidegger calls upon us to do, he would...reduce his living to being. To be is both passive and intransitive. In living, man relates himself actively to the world...The decisive form of human being is human living...to bring into being, to come into meaning. We transcend being by bringing into being—thoughts, things, offspring, deeds."

Heschel's work deals with man's relation to God and man's ability to make meaning in his own life through the sanctification of certain traditions, ideas, and time periods. Heschel's books (especially Who Is Man?) are primarily concerned with the existential question of the purpose and meaning of human life, which is one of the foundational questions of theology concerning the relationship between human beings and God.

Heschel is also reacting to Nietzsche's secular existentialism in Who Is Man? In reaction to Nietzsche's assertion that man must make meaning for himself by his "will to power" in an indifferent universe, Heschel cites human being's obsession with finding meaning outside of themselves as evidence of the existence of a higher being. He says, "To be overtaken with awe of God is not to entertain a feeling but to share in a spirit that permeates all being." For Heschel, man's proclivity to be in awe of God is an important part of the make-up of all humans. He can be said to be an "experiential Jew" concerned with the interior experience of God as the primary mode of popular religious experience. Rabbi Soloveitchik (see below) would call Heschel a "homo religiosus". Heschel is also reacting to Kierkegaard and Nietzsche's secular existentialism in Who Is Man? Heschel can be said to be an "experiential Jew" or a "homo religious" ("religious man") "totally devoted and given over to a cosmos that is filled with divine secrets and eternal mysteries".

=== Joseph Soloveitchik ===
In Halakhic Man, Joseph Soloveitchik responds to Kierkegaard and Heschel's emphasis on the interiority of religious experience. Both Heschel (an extremely knowledgeable scholar of Judaism who was a rabbi in the mystical Hassidic tradition) and Kierkegaard (who wrote extensively on the internal struggle to know God as the primary mode of religious experience) would be considered examples of "religious man" for Soloveitchik. In Halakhic Man, Soloveitchik seeks to shift the paradigm of religion from one of "religious experience", consciousness, and interiority (i.e. profound meditations of the nature of the soul, the self, and God) to a more worldly "Lawfulness". According to Soloveitchik, Halakha (the Jewish code of law) is a better expression of religious identity and passion than the unthinking mysticism and piety of the religious or spiritual human. After all, Halakhic (lawful) man is motivated by a "passionate love of the truth" and all his actions are intended to bring him closer to God and God closer to the world. This more worldly approach to Judaism not only allows the human being to approach God, but also brings God closer to the world. This is because following the mitzvoth contained within the halakha is a positive moral action which improves the world and the person obeying the mitzvoth.

Throughout the book, Soloveitchik often returns to his three-part construction of the "cognitive man", the "religious man", and the "Halakhic man". "Cognitive man" is a modern, scientifically-minded rational human who seeks to rationalize everything and explain occurrences in terms of rule-following natural phenomena. "Religious man" is a mystical believer in divine mysteries and internal ecstatic religious experience. "Halakhic man" takes the analytic, rational nature of "scientific man" and combines it with the love of the divine central to religious man's character. Halakhic man is also committed to living under God's law.

Kierkegaard says that to love one's neighbor perfectly as Jesus did is "the fulfilling of the law". However, R. Soloveitchik would say in response that "living under the law" requires much more than "loving the neighbor" and points to a much larger body of law (Jewish Halakha) that gives the Jew the ability to connect to God in a much more concrete way. In general, Christianity de-emphasizes law and the Torah's commandments, emphasizing faith in God and general morality. Judaism emphasizes law and the Commandments. Soloveitchik's purpose in writing Halakhic Man is to explain to the secular Jew and other lay-readers the benefits of Orthodox Judaism's focus on externalized law over internalized faith as a way for humans to add meaning to their own lives and transcend their base humanity. For the Halakhic man, being religious and spiritual is not about correct mindfulness alone (though this may have its part in the religious experience) but is rather about right action. Right moral action is part and parcel in following God's Halakha, given to the Jews as part of the Torah at Sinai.

A classic example from the book of Halakhic Man using the law to add meaning to his own life is Soloveitchik's explanation of the religious Jew's reaction to a beautiful sunrise or sunset:

"When halakhic man looks to see the western horizon and sees the fading rays of the setting sun or to the eastern horizon and sees the first light of dawn...he knows that this sunset or sunrise imposes upon him anew obligations and commandments. Dawn and sunrise obligate him to fulfill those commandments that are performed during the day: the recitation of the morning Shema, tzitzit, tefillin, the morning prayer...It is not anything transcendent that creates holiness but rather the visible reality..."

Instead of simply wondering at the beauty and mystery of God's creation as the mystic "religious man" (like Kierkegaard or Heschel), Soloveitchik's "Halakhic man" has rigorous laws to follow for every new natural phenomena and life cycle event he encounters, thereby sanctifying his life and the existence of the universe with each day. The Halakha is Soloveitchik's answer to the question of how to make a human being's life meaningful.
