= ECO (denomination) =

US-based Christian denomination

ECO: A Covenant Order of Evangelical Presbyterians
- Classification: Protestant
- Orientation: Reformed Evangelical
- Polity: Presbyterian
- Synod Executive: Dana Allin
- Associations: World Communion of Reformed Churches; National Association of Evangelicals
- Headquarters: Irving, Texas
- Origin: 2012
- Separated from: Presbyterian Church (USA)
- Congregations: 383 congregations
- Members: 129,765
- Ministers: 500
- Official website: eco-pres.org

ECO: A Covenant Order of Evangelical Presbyterians is an evangelical Presbyterian denomination in the United States. As a Presbyterian church, ECO adheres to Reformed theology and Presbyterian polity. It was established in 2012 by former congregations and members of the Presbyterian Church (USA), abbreviated PC(USA). Denominational disputes over theology—particularly ordination of practicing homosexuals as pastors and gay marriage—and bureaucracy led to the founding of ECO. In 2018, ECO has over 383 congregations, 103,425 covenant partners (church members) and over 500 pastors. ECO churches are egalitarian in beliefs and ordain women as pastors and elders.

== Name ==
The acronym "ECO" came from its original denominational name, which was the Evangelical Covenant Order of Presbyterians. Because the nickname stuck, the denomination kept it and repurposed it to represent ECO's three-fold commitment to make disciples of Jesus Christ (Evangelical), connect leaders through accountable relationships and encourage collaboration (Covenant), and commit to a shared way of life together (Order). The name "ECO" also speaks to the commitment to "strengthen the 'ecosystems' of local churches" by providing the environment and resources to produce healthy churches.

== History ==
ECO first grew out of discussions that took place in 2010 among pastors of the Presbyterian Church (USA) who were concerned about "growing denominational disputes over theology and bureaucracy" they believed were distractions from the church's primary calling to spread the gospel. PC(USA) had faced controversy for years over its liberal theology and disputes over interpretations of the Bible. In 2008, its General Assembly proposed allowing the ordination of partnered LGBT clergy. This proposal was adopted in 2011, but it was opposed by some evangelical Presbyterians.

In February 2011, a group of pastors issued a white paper that declared the PC(USA) "deathly ill" and called for a new approach. In August, the Fellowship of Presbyterians was formed as an umbrella organization of evangelicals in the Presbyterian Church (USA). The Fellowship initiated plans for ECO in response to interest from pastors and congregations for a new Presbyterian denomination. ECO was created to accommodate conservative Presbyterians that permitted the ordination of women. While other conservative Presbyterian churches in the United States existed, most of these did not permit female clergy with the exception of the Evangelical Presbyterian Church, to which most of the PC(USA) presbyteries would not release the departing congregations to leave with their church properties due to the fact that the EPC did not mandate female clergy regarding it as non-essential.

ECO was officially launched in January 2012 at a conference in Orlando, Florida. It began accepting member congregations in April. In the five years between 2012 and 2017, 303 churches and 121,000 people left the PC(USA) to join ECO.

== Beliefs ==
=== Essential Tenets ===
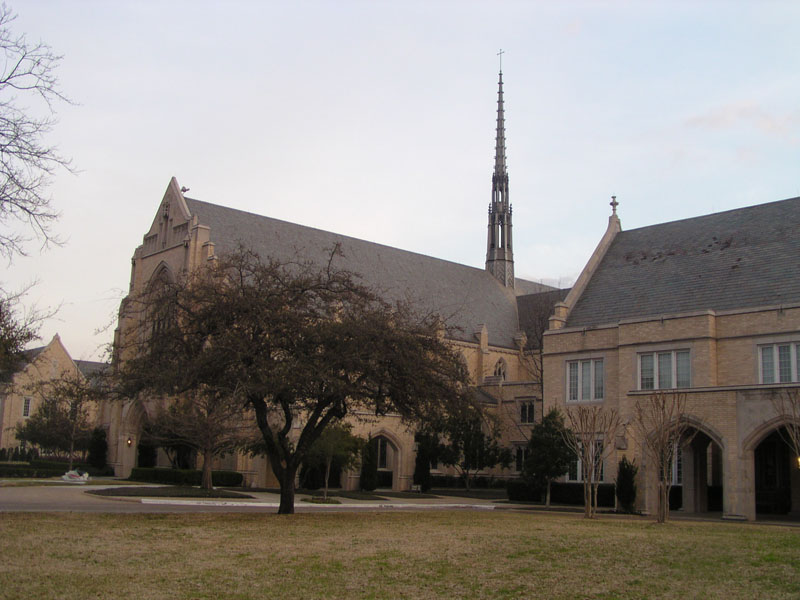
Highland Park Presbyterian Church, Dallas, Texas

The beliefs of ECO are expressed in a statement of Essential Tenets. These are part of ECO's constitution and is the denomination's binding theological document.

The Essential Tenets affirm that the Old and New Testaments are infallible and authoritative, containing everything necessary for faith and life. In common with other Christians, ECO believes in the doctrine of the Trinity and the Incarnation—the "two central Christian mysteries"—and that the only hope of salvation and adoption as children of God is God's grace in Jesus Christ. Reflecting its Reformed heritage, ECO believes that, as a consequence of the Fall of Man, humans lost free will and are incapable of turning towards God. Salvation is made possible by only the irresistible grace of God, who chose the elect before the world was created.

The Essential Tenets explain that within the church, God's grace is received through the preaching of the Word of God, the administration of the sacraments of baptism and the Lord's Supper, and church discipline. The offices of teaching elder, deacon, and ruling elder correspond to Christ's three-fold office of prophet, priest, and king. Because it believes that both men and women are called to all ministries in the church, ECO ordains women. All church members are to embody the three-fold offices in their daily lives by sharing and enacting the Gospel and extending the lordship of Jesus Christ. According to the Essential Tenets, progressive sanctification is an expected characteristic of a Christian life. This includes a life of prayer, regular self-examination (especially guided by the Ten Commandments), and sincere confession of sin. According to the Essential Tenets, Christians are to maintain lives of chastity either through celibacy or marriage between a man and a woman.

=== Confessions ===
The Essential Tenets affirm a number of creeds, confessions and catechisms inherited from the Reformed tradition. These confessions are considered a faithful explanation of scriptural truth and a subordinate standard of doctrine to the Bible. When ECO was organized, its churches continued using the Book of Confessions inherited from the Presbyterian Church (USA). In May 2017, ECO's Theological Task Force released its own edition of the Book of Confessions, which was identical to PC(USA)'s except for the inclusion of new introductions written by members of ECO and the use of a different translation of the Heidelberg Catechism. Between 2016 and 2018, a process of confessional revision concluded with the adoption of the Confessional Standards, which replaced the Book of Confessions. It includes the following doctrinal standards:

- Nicene Creed
- Apostles' Creed
- Heidelberg Catechism
- Westminster Confession of Faith
- Westminster Shorter Catechism
- Westminster Larger Catechism
- Barmen Declaration

Several confessions found in the Book of Confessions were not included in the new Confessional Standards. These include:

- Scots Confession
- Second Helvetic Confession
- Confession of 1967
- Brief Statement of Faith

This seems to indicate that the denomination is no longer espousing the Neo-Orthodoxy or the Barthian theology of the Confession of 1967 and the alleged radical feminism enshrined in the Brief Statement of Faith, which became the foundations of the LGBTQ movements in the PC(USA), in their new Confessional Standards.

=== Practices ===
ECO believes that baptism joins an individual to the Christian Church. It practices infant baptism and recognizes the validity of all Christian baptisms. It practices open communion for all "who put their trust in Jesus Christ". Full members, or "covenant partners", are able to vote in congregational meetings and hold leadership roles. To become a covenant partner, a person must make a public profession of faith in Jesus Christ as savior and lord.

ECO recognizes three ordained offices: pastor, elder and deacon. Ordained officers vow to "receive, adopt, and be bound by the Essential Tenets" and to be guided by the Confessional Standards. Ordination is performed by prayer and the laying on of hands.

== Structure ==
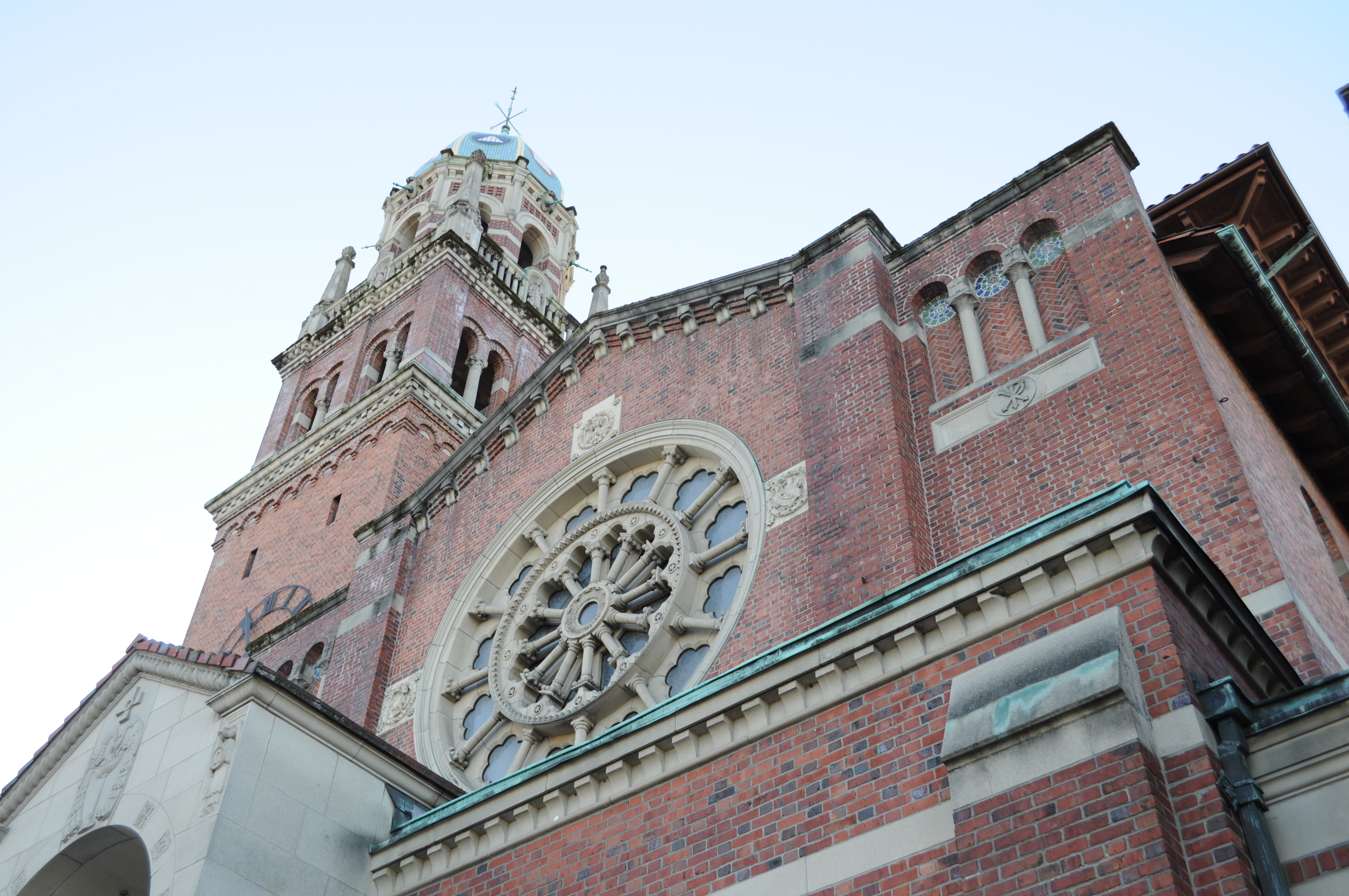
First Presbyterian Church in Tacoma, Washington, designed by Ralph Adams Cram and completed in 1925

ECO follows presbyterian polity. Each congregation is governed by a session of elders elected by the members. The session also includes the pastor, who chairs or "moderates" session meetings. Congregations are organized into presbyteries, which exist to provide oversight and support to congregations and pastors. The members of a presbytery are its congregations (represented by elders called "commissioners") and pastors. ECO presbyteries typically range in size from 10 to 20 congregations. There are 22 geographical presbyteries:

- East Central Presbytery (Kentucky, West Virginia, Virginia and Maryland)
- Presbytery of Florida
- Great Lakes Presbytery (Michigan, Ohio)
- Presbytery of Texas (Texas, Louisiana)
- Presbytery of the West (Idaho, Montana, Wyoming, Nevada, Utah, Colorado, New Mexico)
- Presbytery of Northern California
- Presbytery of the Northwest (Oregon and Washington)
- Presbytery of Southern California
- Presbytery of Alaska
- Presbytery of the South (Tennessee, Mississippi, Alabama, Georgia)
- Presbytery of the Rivers of Life (western Pennsylvania)
- Upper Midwest Presbytery (North Dakota, South Dakota, Minnesota, Nebraska and Iowa).
- Bluewater Presbytery (Hawaii and parts of California)
- Mission Presbytery (parts of California)
- Presbytery of Mid America (Kansas, Missouri, Oklahoma, Arkansas)
- Heritage Presbytery (Delaware, New Jersey, Southeast Pennsylvania)
- Cornerstone Presbytery (New York, Northeast Pennsylvania)
- Northeast Coast Presbytery
- Presbytery of North Carolina
- Hope Presbytery (Arizona)
- Presbytery of the Harvest (Illinois, Indiana, Wisconsin)
- Presbytery of South Carolina

The synod is the chief decision-making body of the denomination. Synod commissioners are elected by the presbyteries and include both elders and ordained pastors. The synod elects an executive council, which has power to organize presbyteries, settle disputes between them and manage the ongoing operations of the denomination.

=== Statistics ===
In 2018, there are over 383 congregations, 129,765 members and 500 pastors affiliated with ECO.

Year	Churches	Membership
2012	49	20,000
2013	---	--,---
2014	77	60,000
2015	235	80,000
2016	297	115,000
2017	303	121,000
2018	383	129,765
2019	---	---,---
2020	391	127,000
2021	TBD	TBD

== Notable congregations ==
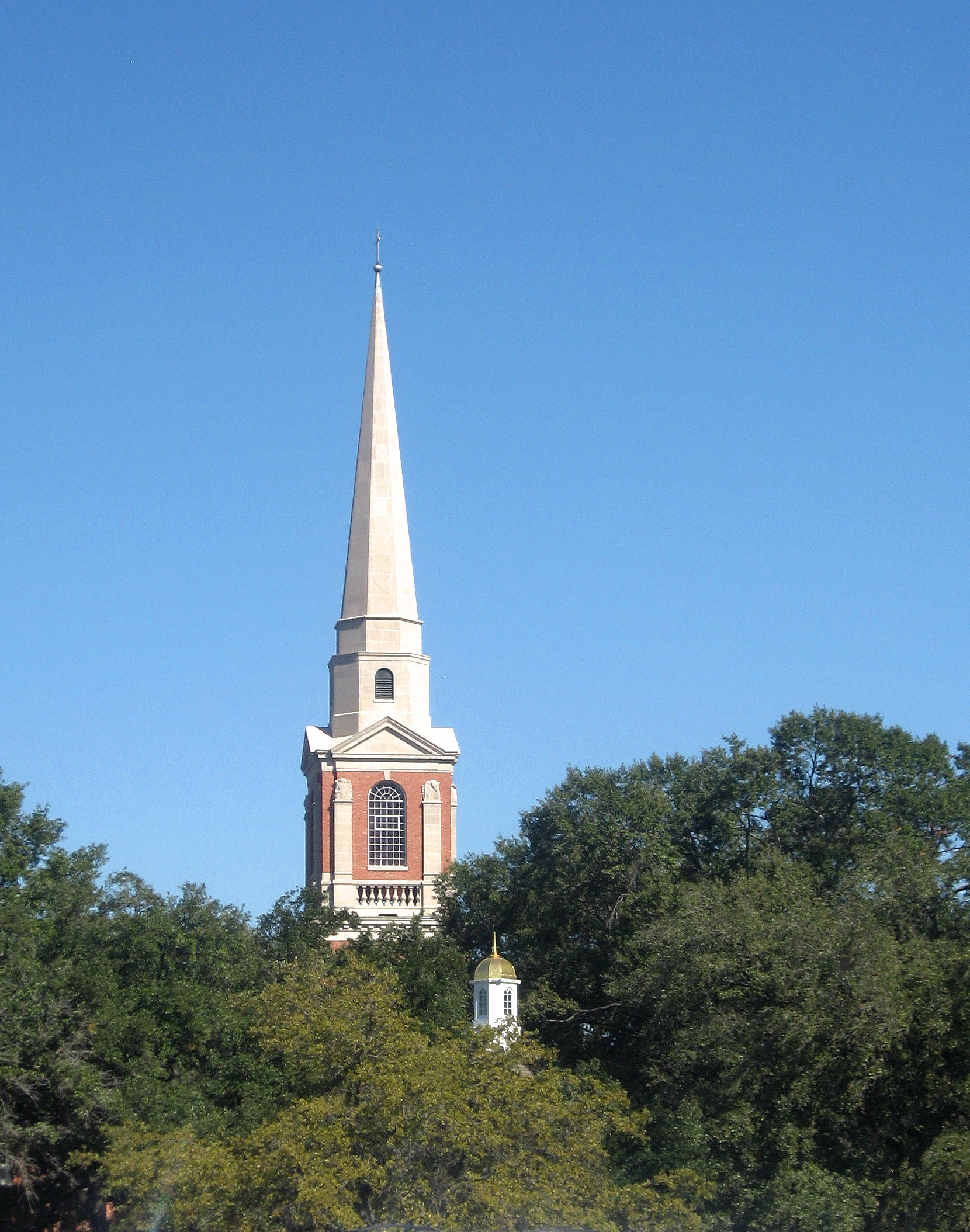
First Presbyterian Church, Houston, Texas

- Austin Korean Presbyterian Church (Austin, Texas)
- Binnerri Presbyterian Church (Dallas, Texas)
- Chapel by the Lake (Juneau, Alaska)
- Christ Presbyterian Church (Edina, Minnesota)
- First Presbyterian Church (Colorado Springs, Colorado)
- First Presbyterian Church (Carson City, Nevada)
- First Presbyterian Church (Mount Holly, New Jersey)
- First Presbyterian Church (Corpus Christi, Texas)
- First Presbyterian Church (Houston, Texas)
- First Presbyterian Church (Tacoma, Washington)
- Good Shepherd Presbyterian Church (Chino Hills, California)
- Grace Presbyterian Church (Houston, Texas)
- Highland Park Presbyterian Church (Dallas, Texas)
- Menlo Church (San Francisco Bay Area, California)
- Memorial Drive Presbyterian Church (Houston, Texas)
- Park Road Presbyterian Church (Wyomissing, Pennsylvania)
- Pilgrim Mission Church (Teaneck, New Jersey)
- St. Andrews Presbyterian Church (Newport Beach, California)
- Tacoma Central Presbyterian Church (Tacoma, Washington)
- Grace Presbyterian Church, ECO (Columbus, Georgia)
