= Warfield Lectures =

The Warfield Lectures are named in honor of Annie Kinkead Warfield, the wife of Benjamin Breckinridge Warfield professor of theology at the Princeton Theological Seminary from 1887 to 1921.

Where lectures have been published the book titles are below.

== Lecturers ==
- 1959 - James I. McCord "The Grace of God in Christian Theology"
- 1960 - John K. Reid "The Life in Christ"
- 1961 – Jaques Courvoisier Zwingli: A Reformed Theologian
- Apr. 1962 – Karl Barth Evangelical Theology: An Introduction
- Nov. 1962 - Kenneth Joseph Foreman Identification: Human and Divine
- 1964 – Hendrikus Berkhof The Doctrine of the Holy Spirit ISBN 0-8042-0551-5
- 1965 – John McIntyre The Shape of Christology: Studies in the Doctrine of the Person of Christ ISBN 0-3340-1513-8
- 1966 - Otto Weber "Calvin’s Doctrine of the Church"
- 1967 - James M. Robinson "The New Testament as Hermeneutic"
- 1968 - Roger Mehl Catholic Ethics and Protestant Ethics ISBN 0-6642-0903-3
- 1969 - Ronald Gregor Smith (cancelled due to his death) The Doctrine of God ISBN 0-6642-0889-4
- 1970 – John E. Smith The Analogy of Experience: An Approach to Understanding Religious Truth ISBN 0-0606-7420-2
- 1971 - Lukas Vischer "Church and Mankind"
- 1972 - Langdon Gilkey "Providence and Eschatology: Theological Reflections on History and Politics"
- 1973 – Paul Ricoeur "Philosophical and Theological Hermeneutics"
- 1974 - William O. Fennell God’s Intention for Man: Essays in Christian Anthropology ISBN 0-9198-1205-8
- 1975 - Daniel Thomas Jenkins Christian Maturity & Christian Success ISBN 978-0-80-061657-1
- 1976 - C. A. Van Peursen
- 1977 - Robert McAfee Brown "Theology in a New Day: An Exercise in Transposition"
- 1978 – George S. Hendry "The Theology of Nature"
- 1979 – Paul L. Lehmann "The Commandments and the Common Life", published posthumously as The Decalogue and a Human Future (1995) ISBN 0-8028-0835-2
- 1981 – Thomas F. Torrance The Trinitarian Faith: The Evangelical Theology of the Ancient Catholic Church ISBN 978-0-56-709483-4
- 1982 – Hugh T. Kerr
- 1983 – Jane Dempsey Douglass Women, Freedom, and Calvin ISBN 0-664-24663-X
- 1984 – Lesslie Newbigin Foolishness to the Greeks: The Gospel and Western Culture ISBN 0-8028-0176-5
- 1986 – Letty M. Russell Household of Freedom: Authority in Feminist Theology ISBN 978-0-66-424017-2
- 1989 – John W. de Gruchy Liberating Reformed Theology (1991) ISBN 0-8028-0536-1
- 1991 – Michael Welker Creation and Reality ISBN 0-8006-2628-1
- 1993 – Colin Gunton A Brief Theology of Revelation ISBN 0-567-29293-2
- 1994 – B. A. Gerrish Saving and Secular Faith: Toward a Systematic Theology ISBN 0-8006-2850-0
- 1995 – Shirley Guthrie Always Being Reformed: Faith for a Fragmented World ISBN 978-0-66-425683-8
- 1996 – Christina Baxter
- 1997 – Karlfried Froehlich Sensing the Scriptures: Aminadab's Chariot and the Predicament of Biblical Interpretation ISBN 0-8028-7080-5
- 2000 – Gerhard Sauter Protestant Theology at the Crossroads: How to Face the Crucial Tasks for Theology in the Twenty-First Century ISBN 0-8028-4034-5
- 2001 – J. B. Torrance
- 2002 – James M. Gustafson An Examined Faith: The Grace of Self-Doubt ISBN 0-8006-3628-7
- 2003 – John Polkinghorne Science and the Trinity: The Christian Encounter With Reality ISBN 0-3001-0445-6
- 2004 – Eberhard Busch The Barmen Theses Then and Now ISBN 0-8028-6617-4
- 2007 – Kathryn Tanner Christ the Key ISBN 0-5217-3277-8
- 2009 – Randall C. Zachman Reconsidering John Calvin ISBN 1-1076-0177-0
- 2009 – David Fergusson The Providence of God: A Polyphonic Approach ISBN 1-1084-6657-5
- 2011 – David Kelsey
- 2012 – Cornelius Plantinga Reading for Preaching: The Preacher in Conversation with Storytellers, Biographers, Poets, and Journalists ISBN 0-8028-7077-5
- 2013 – Jennifer Herdt Assuming Responsibility: Ecstatic Eudaimonism and the Call to Live Well ISBN 0-1928-4920-4
- 2014 – Kees van der Kooi This Incredibly Benevolent Force. The Holy Spirit in Reformed Theology and Spirituality ISBN 0-8028-7613-7
- 2015 – Sarah Coakley
- 2016 – J. Kameron Carter
- 2018 – Dirk J. Smit
- 2022 – Friederike Nüssel
- 2024 - Philip G. Ziegler God's Adversary and Ours: A Brief Theology of the Devil ISBN 978-1-48-132413-7
