= Jane Dempsey Douglass =

American Reformed theologian (born 1933)

- Born: Essie Jane Dempsey; March 22, 1933 (age 93); Wilmington, Delaware, US
- Other name: Essie Jane Dempsey Douglass
- Title: President of the World Alliance of Reformed Churches (1990–1997)
- Spouse: Gordon K. Douglass (died 2017)

Academic background
- Education: Syracuse University; Radcliffe College; Harvard University
- Thesis: The Doctrine of Justification in the Preaching of John Geiler of Keiserberg (1963)

Academic work
- Discipline: Theology; history
- Sub-discipline: Historical theology; ecclesiastical history
- School or tradition: Presbyterianism; Christian feminism
- Institutions: Claremont Graduate School; Princeton Theological Seminary
- Doctoral students: Haruko Nawata Ward
- Notable students: Paul C. H. Lim

Essie Jane Dempsey Douglass (born 1933) is an American Presbyterian theologian and ecclesiastical historian. She was a professor at Claremont Graduate School before becoming the Hazel Thompson McCord Professor of Historical Theology at Princeton Theological Seminary. Douglass served as the President of the World Alliance of Reformed Churches from 1990 to 1997, making her the first woman to head a worldwide communion of churches.

== Early life and education ==
Born in Wilmington, Delaware, United States, on March 22, 1933, Douglass is a graduate of Syracuse University (1954), Radcliffe College, and Harvard University. She received her Doctor of Philosophy degree from Harvard in 1963 following the submission of her thesis The Doctrine of Justification in the Preaching of John Geiler of Keiserberg. She was married to the economist Gordon K. Douglass until his death in 2017.

== Academic and ecclesiastical career ==
Douglass was a professor of church history at the Claremont School of Theology, where she was the first female faculty member, and professor of religion at Claremont Graduate School. She went on to serve as the Hazel Thompson McCord Professor of Historical Theology at Princeton Theological Seminary from 1985 until her retirement in 1998. In 1983, Douglass was the first female President of the American Society of Church History. In the same year, she delivered the Warfield Lectures at Princeton Theological Seminary in a series titled Christian Freedom in Calvin's Theology, which led to the publication of her book Women, Freedom, and Calvin in 1985.

A Christian feminist, Douglass challenged the dominant interpretation of John Calvin's view of the role of women, identifying certain aspects of his thought as protofeminist. Calvin regards the apostle Paul's advice that women should remain silent in church as being adiaphoral, which Douglass argues leaves him open to the possibility of a broader role for women in the church in the future, writing: "Though Calvin sees strong biblical guidance for women's subordinate role in the public life of church and society, and though he finds it appropriate for his own society that women should be subordinate, he holds on principle that the order in which women are subordinate is one determined by human law, ecclesiastical and political [rather than divine law]. Such order can legitimately be adapted to changing circumstances."

A ruling elder in the Presbyterian Church (USA), Douglass helped draft A Brief Statement of Faith, which is part of the church's Book of Confessions. She co-chaired the third round of the Lutheran–Reformed dialogue in North America from 1981 to 1983. Douglass served as the President of the World Alliance of Reformed Churches from 1990 to 1997, making her the first woman to head a worldwide communion of churches.

Douglass has received honorary doctorates from Franklin and Marshall College, the University of St Andrews, and the University of Geneva. She is commemorated by the American Society of Church History with the Jane Dempsey Douglass Prize, awarded annually to the author of the year's "best unpublished essay on some aspect of the role of women in the history of Christianity".

== Bibliography ==
- Justification in Late Medieval Preaching: A Study of John Geiler of Keisersberg. Leiden, Netherlands: E. J. Brill. 1966. LCCN 67007504.
- Women, Freedom, and Calvin. Philadelphia: Westminster Press. 1985. ISBN 978-0-664-24663-1.
- Justification in Late Medieval Preaching: A Study of John Geiler of Keisersberg (2nd ed.). Leiden, Netherlands: E. J. Brill. 1989. doi:10.1163/9789004477728. ISBN 978-90-04-09047-7.
- To Confess the Faith Today. Co-editor with Jack L. Stotts. Louisville, Kentucky: Westminster John Knox Press. 1990. ISBN 978-0-664-25098-0.
- Women, Gender, and Christian Community. Co-editor with James F. Kay. Louisville, Kentucky: Westminster John Knox Press. 1997. ISBN 978-0-664-25728-6.

== See also ==
- Women in Christianity

Religious titles
Preceded by Allan Boesak	President of the World Alliance of Reformed Churches; 1990–1997	Succeeded by C. S. Song
Academic offices
Preceded by Hugh T. Kerr	Warfield Lecturer; 1983	Succeeded by Lesslie Newbigin
