= I and Thou =

1923 book by Martin Buber

- 1958 edition
- Author: Martin Buber
- Original title: Ich und Du
- Translator: Ronald Gregor Smith (1937); Walter Kaufmann (1970)
- Language: German
- Subject: Philosophy
- Publication date: 1923
- Publication place: Germany
- English publication date: 1937

Ich und Du, usually translated as I and Thou, is a book by Martin Buber, published in 1923. It was first translated from German to English in 1937 by Ronald Gregor Smith, with a later translation by Walter Kaufmann being published in 1970. It is Buber's best-known work, setting forth his critique of modern objectification in relationships with others through the contrast between an "I-Thou" and an "I-It" understanding of the world.

== Premise ==
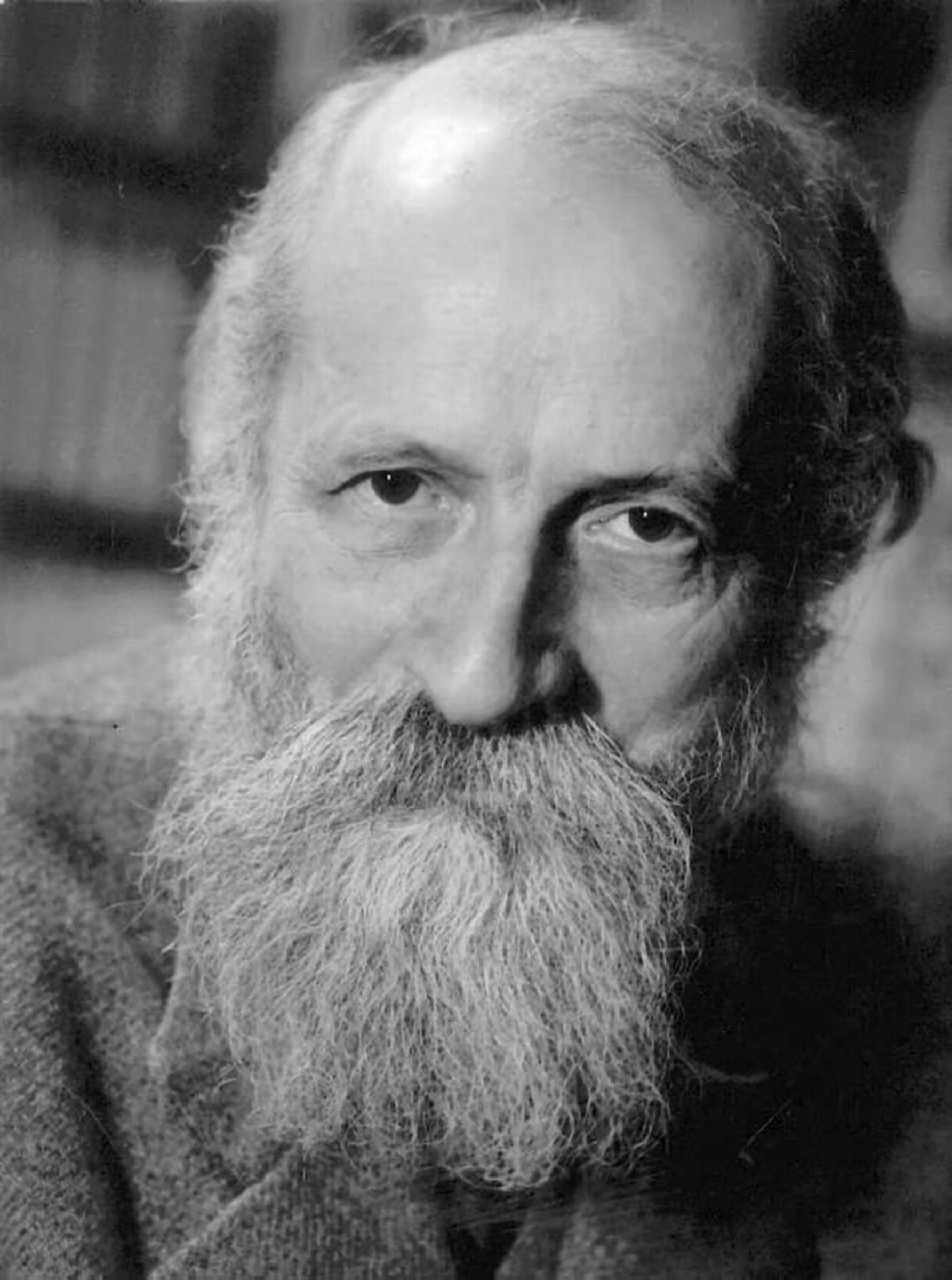
Martin Buber

Buber's main proposition is that we may address existence in two ways:

1. The attitude of the "I" towards an "It", towards an object that is separate in itself, which we either use or experience.
2. The attitude of the "I" towards "Thou", in a relationship in which the other is not separated by discrete bounds.

One of the major themes of the book is that human life finds its meaningfulness in relationships. In Buber's view, all of our relationships bring us ultimately into relationship with God, who is the Eternal Thou. Martin Buber said that every time someone says Thou, they are indirectly addressing God. People can address God as Thou or as God, Buber emphasized how, "You need God in order to be, and God needs you for that which is the meaning of your life."

Buber explains that humans are defined by two word pairs: I–It and I–Thou.

The "It" of I–It refers to the world of experience and sensation. I–It describes entities as discrete objects drawn from a defined set (e.g., he, she or any other objective entity defined by what makes it measurably different from other entities). It can be said that "I" have as many distinct and different relationships with each "It" as there are "Its" in one's life. Fundamentally, "It" refers to the world as we experience it.

By contrast, the word pair I–Thou describes the world of relations. This is the "I" that does not objectify any "It" but rather acknowledges a living relationship. I–Thou relationships are sustained in the spirit and mind of an "I" for however long the feeling or idea of relationship is the dominant mode of perception. A person sitting next to a complete stranger on a park bench may enter into an "I–Thou" relationship with the stranger merely by beginning to think positively about people in general. The stranger is a person as well, and gets instantaneously drawn into a mental or spiritual relationship with the person whose positive thoughts necessarily include the stranger as a member of the set of persons about whom positive thoughts are directed. It is not necessary for the stranger to have any idea that he is being drawn into an "I–Thou" relationship for such a relationship to arise. But what is crucial to understand is the word pair "I–Thou" can refer to a relationship with a tree, the sky, or the park bench itself as much as it can refer to the relationship between two individuals. The essential character of "I–Thou" is the abandonment of the world of sensation, the melting of the between, so that the relationship with another "I" is foremost.

Buber's two notions of "I" require attachment of the word "I" to a word partner. The splitting into the individual terms "I" and "it" and "thou" is only for the purposes of analysis. Despite the separation of "I" from the "It" and "Thou" in this very sentence describing the relationship, there is to Buber's mind either an I–Thou or an I–It relationship. Every sentence that a person uses with "I" refers to the two pairs: "I–Thou" and "I–It", and likewise "I" is implicit in every sentence with "Thou" or "It". Each "It" is bounded by others and It can only exist through this attachment because for every object there is another object. The "Thou", on the other hand, has no limitations. When "Thou" is spoken, the speaker has no thing (has nothing), hence, "Thou" is abstract; yet the speaker "takes his stand in relation".

What does it mean to experience the world? One goes around the world extracting knowledge from the world in experiences betokened by "He", "She", and "It". One also has I–Thou relationships. Experience is all physical, but these relationships involve a great deal of spirituality. The twofold nature of the world means that our being in the world has two aspects: the aspect of experience, which is perceived as I–It, and the aspect of relation, which is perceived as I–Thou.

== Examples ==
Buber uses an example of a tree and presents five separate relations:

1. Looking at the tree as a picture with the color and detail through the aesthetic perception.
2. Identifying the tree as movement. The movement includes the flow of the juices through the veins of the tree, the breathing of the leaves, the roots sucking the water, the never-ending activities between the tree and earth and air, and the growth of the tree.
3. Categorizing the tree by its type; in other words, studying it.
4. Exercising the ability to look at something from a different perspective. "I can subdue its actual presence and form so sternly that I recognize it only as an expression of law".
5. Interpreting the experience of the tree in mathematical terms.

Through all of these relations, the tree is still an object that occupies time and space and still has the characteristics that make it what it is.

If "Thou" is used in the context of an encounter with a human being, the human being is not He, She, or bound by anything. You do not experience the human being; rather you can only relate to him or her in the sacredness of the I–Thou relation. The I–Thou relationship cannot be explained; it simply is. Nothing can intervene in the I–Thou relationship. I–Thou is not a means to some object or goal, but a definitive relationship involving the whole being of each subject.

Like the I–Thou relation, love is a subject-to-subject relationship. Love is not a relation of subject to object, but rather a relation in which both members in the relationship are subjects and share the unity of being.

The ultimate Thou is God. In the I–Thou relation there are no barriers. This enables us to relate directly to God. God is ever-present in human consciousness, manifesting in music, literature, and other forms of culture. Inevitably, Thou is addressed as It, and the I–Thou relation becomes the being of the I–Thou relation. God is now spoken to directly, not spoken about.

There is no world that disconnects one from God, a world of It alone, when I–Thou guides one's actions. "One who truly meets the world goes out also to God." God is the worldwide relation to all relations.

== Lasting impacts ==
Martin Buber's work of I and Thou has had a profound and lasting impact on modern thinking, as well as the field of psychology in particular. Figures in American history have been influenced by this work, including one of the founding fathers of modern humanistic psychology, Carl Rogers. In 1957, Rogers and Buber engaged in their famous Dialogue, where Buber's philosophy of "I and Thou" was discussed. Rogers compares his person-centered therapy and the necessary psychological contact to the I–Thou relationship; while Buber does not completely agree, pointing out that the therapist-client relationship is on somewhat unequal footing, they do concede that there are momentary, true connections made between therapist and client that are "reciprocal" and have a degree of "mutuality". Rogers expressed that in moments where clients undergo true change, there is a distinct connection and understanding between client and therapist, as in I–Thou relationships.

Buber's work also influenced the Civil Rights leader Martin Luther King Jr. The "I–Thou" relationship is quoted in his Letter from Birmingham Jail and his sermon, "A Testament of Hope." In that sermon, King describes the cultural and legal climate of segregation in his time as an "I–It" relationship, and that only when the divinity within the African American population is seen is the relationship transformed to "I–Thou." King says, "I cannot reach fulfillment without thou". He also mentions this unique relationship in his Letter, reiterating that the "I–It" relationship inherent in segregation does reduce human beings to "things".

== See also ==
- Alterity and the Other
- Philosophy of dialogue
- Tat Tvam Asi
- The whole is more than the sum of its parts or 'holism'
- Thing-in-itself
- Objectification
- Pantheism / Panentheism
- Personalism

== English translations ==
The book has been translated to English twice, by Ronald Gregor Smith in 1937 and by Walter Kaufmann in 1970.

- Buber, Martin (1937). I and Thou. Translated by Ronald Gregor Smith. Edinburgh: T. & T. Clark.
- Buber, Martin (1970). I and Thou. Translated by Walter Kaufmann. New York: Charles Scribner's Sons. ISBN 9780684717258.
