= David Fergusson (theologian) =

Scottish theologian (born 1956)

The Reverend Professor David Fergusson OBE FRSE FBA
- Born: David Alexander Syme Fergusson; 3 August 1956 (age 70); Glasgow, Scotland
- Title: Principal of New College, Edinburgh (2008–2018)

Ecclesiastical career
- Religion: Christianity (Presbyterian)
- Church: Church of Scotland

Academic background
- Education: University of Glasgow; University of Edinburgh; University of Oxford
- Thesis: Realism and Idealism in Christian Interpretation with Special Reference to Bultmann (1984)

Academic work
- Discipline: Theology
- Sub-discipline: Systematic theology
- Institutions: University of Aberdeen; University of Edinburgh; Magdalene College, Cambridge
- Doctoral students: Titus Chung; Paul Nimmo
- Notable students: Oliver D. Crisp

David Alexander Syme Fergusson OBE FRSE FBA (born 3 August 1956) is a Scottish theologian and Presbyterian minister. Since 2021, he has been Regius Professor of Divinity at the University of Cambridge.

== Early life and education ==
Fergusson was born on 3 August 1956 in Glasgow, Scotland. He studied philosophy at the University of Glasgow, graduating with an undergraduate Master of Arts (MA Hons) degree in 1977. He then studied theology at the University of Edinburgh, graduating with a Bachelor of Divinity (BD) degree in 1980. He then undertook a Doctor of Philosophy (DPhil) degree in Christian philosophy at the University of Oxford; his DPhil was awarded in 1984 for a doctoral thesis titled Realism and Idealism in Christian Interpretation with Special Reference to Bultmann.

== Career ==
Fergusson was Assistant Minister at St Nicholas Parish Church, Lanark, from 1983 to 1984 and Associate Minister at St Mungo's Parish Church, Cumbernauld, from 1984 to 1986.

In 1985, he was appointed a lecturer at the University of Edinburgh. In 1990, he was appointed Professor of Systematic Theology at the University of Aberdeen, before moving to Edinburgh to take up the position of the Chair of Divinity in 2000. He held this post at New College in the University of Edinburgh until 2021. In April 2021, he was appointed Regius Professor of Divinity, one of the oldest professorships of the University of Cambridge.

Fergusson is a Fellow of the British Academy (elected 2013), a Fellow of the Royal Society of Edinburgh, and was an associate director of the Centre for Theology and Public Issues. He delivered the Cunningham Lectures in Edinburgh in 1996, the Bampton Lectures in Oxford in 2001, the Gifford Lectures at the University of Glasgow in 2008, and the Warfield Lectures at Princeton Theological Seminary in 2009. He was awarded the honorary degree of Doctor of Divinity by the University of Aberdeen (2014).

He was installed as a personal chaplain to the Queen in November 2015 and was appointed Officer of the Order of the British Empire (OBE) in the 2016 Birthday Honours for services to education, the arts, and the Church of Scotland. From 2008 to 2018, he served as Principal of New College. In July 2019 the Queen appointed him as Dean of the Chapel Royal in Scotland and Dean of the Order of the Thistle. He took part in the Royal procession at the 2023 Coronation, and was the lead minister at the Presentation of the Honours of Scotland service held in St Giles' Cathedral. Fergusson also served as Chaplain to Lady Elish Angiolini during her time in office as Lord High Commissioner to the General Assembly of the Church of Scotland.

== See also ==
- The History of Scottish Theology

Religious titles
Preceded by Iain Torrance	Dean of the Chapel Royal; 2019–present	Incumbent
Preceded by Iain Torrance	Dean of the Thistle; 2019–present	Incumbent
Academic offices
Preceded by	Gifford Lecturer at the University of Glasgow; 2007–2008	Succeeded by Charles Taylor
Preceded by A. Graeme Auld	Principal of New College, Edinburgh; 2008–2018	Succeeded by Susan Hardman Moore
Preceded by Ian A. McFarland	Regius Professor of Divinity at the University of Cambridge; 2021–present	Incumbent
Professional and academic associations
Preceded by Anthony Thiselton	President of the Society for the Study of Theology; 2001–2002	Succeeded by Peter Selby
