= Philip G. Ziegler =

Canadian-born theologian

- Born: Ontario, Canada
- Occupation: full professor

Academic background
- Education: University of Toronto; Royal Military College of Canada

Academic work
- Institutions: Christ's College, Aberdeen; University of Aberdeen

Philip G. Ziegler is a Canadian-born theologian who holds a personal chair as Professor in Christian Dogmatics at the University of Aberdeen. He is author of numerous scholarly articles, books, and has led various research projects within contemporary dogmatics, the theology of Dietrich Bonhoeffer, as well as theological reflection on New Testament apocalyptic. He maintains a personal website: Theologia Borealis.

== Education and academic career ==
Ziegler began his university studies at the Royal Military College of Canada and went on to graduate from the University of Toronto (B.A. Hons.), the University of St Michael’s College (M.A.), Regis College (S.T.L) and Emmanuel College of Victoria University / University of Toronto (M.Div. and Th.D.). His postgraduate studies concentrated upon systematic and historical theology, ecumenics, and the philosophy of religion. His thesis in Toronto was published as Doing Theology When God is Forgotten – The Theological Achievement of Wolf Krötke, a leading Protestant theologian of the church in the former GDR and later eastern Germany after die Wende.

In 2000/01 he was a Junior Fellow of Massey College in the University of Toronto, and in 2001/02 he held a Postdoctoral Research Fellowship at Princeton University’s Center for the Study of Religion.

From 2002 to 2005 he taught at the Atlantic School of Theology in Halifax, Canada as assistant professor of systematic theology. In January 2006 he joined the faculty of the University of Aberdeen in Divinity & Religious Studies. Since then, he has taught systematic theology and Christian doctrine at the University of Aberdeen where he was promoted to a personal chair in 2016. Ziegler is also a Senior Fellow of the Higher Education Academy, UK.

== Professional activities ==
Together with Paul Nimmo and Tom Greggs, Ziegler co-founded and co-directs the Aberdeen Centre for Protestant Theology, which aims at facilitating, coordinating and promoting advanced research in the field of Christian theology. The center hosts lectures and seminars from current voices who offer critical engagement as well as positive development of Protestant thought in service of the Church.

Along with others, he helps coordinate the 'Explorations in Theology and Apocalyptic' working group at the annual AAR / SBL meetings.

Ziegler is editor-in-chief of Brill Companions to Modern Theology, and an associate editor of the Journal of Reformed Theology.

He is co-editor of the T&T Clark Studies in Systematic Theology series (along with Ian MacFarland and Ivor Davidson), and of the T&T Clark New Studies in Bonhoeffer’s Theology and Ethics (along with Jennifer McBride and Michael Mawson).

=== Ecclesiastical work ===
Ziegler was ordained to the Order of Ministry of the United Church of Canada in 1996, he is associated with the Kirk Session of St Machar Cathedral Church, Aberdeen.

== Selected works ==
=== Books ===
- Militant Grace: The Apocalyptic Turn and the Future of Christian Theology (Baker Academic, 2018)
- Doing Theology When God is Forgotten: The Theological Achievement of Wolf Krötke (Berlin: Peter Lang, 2006).

=== Edited books ===
- The Oxford Handbook of Dietrich Bonhoeffer, edited by Michael Mawson and Philip G. Ziegler (Oxford: Oxford University Press, 2019)
- Eternal God, Eternal Life: Theological Investigations into the Concept of Immortality, edited by Philip G. Ziegler (London: T&T Clark/Bloomsbury, 2016)
- Christ, Church and World: New Studies in Bonhoeffer’s Theology and Ethics, edited by Philip G. Ziegler and Michael Mawson (London: T&T Clark/Bloomsbury, 2016)
- The Providence of God, edited by Philip G. Ziegler and Francesca Murphy (London: T&T Clark/Continuum, 2009).
- Explorations in Christian Theology and Ethics: Essays in Conversation with Paul L. Lehmann, edited by Philip G. Ziegler and Michelle J. Bartel (Aldershot: Ashgate, 2009).
- George P. Schner, Essays Catholic and Critical, edited by Philip G. Ziegler and Mark Husbands. (Aldershot: Ashgate Press, 2003).
