= Michael Mawson =

New Zealand theologian (born 1978)

- Mawson in 2022
- Born: 1978 (age 47–48)
- Occupations: Professor; theologian
- Title: Maclaurin Goodfellow Associate Professor of Theological and Religious Studies

Academic background
- Education: Victoria University of Wellington; University of Notre Dame

Academic work
- Discipline: Theology
- Institutions: Charles Sturt University; University of Aberdeen; University of Auckland
- Main interests: Disability theology; Dietrich Bonhoeffer; theological ethics

Michael Mawson (born 1978) is a New Zealand theologian and ethicist. He serves as the Maclaurin Goodfellow Associate Professor of Theological and Religious Studies at University of Auckland, a post that previously held by Elaine Wainwright and Joseph Bulbulia. He is an international expert on the theology of Dietrich Bonhoeffer and has published widely in the area of Christian ethics.

== Background ==
Mawson grew up in New Zealand. He has degrees in Religious Studies from Victoria University of Wellington and holds a PhD in theology from the University of Notre Dame, USA. Prior to taking up the Maclaurin Goodfellow chair, Mawson taught in the School of Theology at Charles Sturt University, Australia, and the Department of Divinity at University of Aberdeen, Scotland.

== Professional activities ==
Mawson was co-organiser of the 2014 international conference The Freedom of a Christian Ethicist (with Brian Brock) whose proceedings were published by T&T Clark/Bloomsbury. He has edited and co-edited special issues of the leading journal Studies in Christian Ethics. He is co-editor of the T&T Clark book series New Studies in Bonhoeffer's Theology and Ethics (with Jennifer McBride and Philip G. Ziegler). He is a fellow of the James M. Houston Centre for Humanity and the Common Good, directed by Jens Zimmermann. He was also an invited member of the funded interdisciplinary research group, Human Flourishing in a Technological World.

He was an invited participant in Oxford University's 2020 MacDonald Centre's conference, Ageing and Despair: Towards Patience and Hope for Health and Care. He is co-organiser of the XIV International Bonhoeffer Congress in 2024 (with Dianne Rayson) and a member of the executive committee of the International Bonhoeffer Society, English Language Section.

== Selected works ==
Mawson's theological contributions have centred on Protestant Christian ethics, particularly the legacy of the 20th-century Lutheran theologian Dietrich Bonhoeffer. but also covers gerontological ethics and questions of disability among other issues.

=== Books ===
- Standing Under the Cross: Essays on Bonhoeffer's Theology (T&T Clark Bloomsbury, 2022)
- Christ Existing as Community: Bonhoeffer's Ecclesiology (Oxford: Oxford University Press, 2018).

=== Edited books ===
- The Ethics of Grace: Engaging Gerald McKenny, edited by Michael Mawson and Paul Martens (London: T&T Clark Bloomsbury, 2022)
- The Oxford Handbook of Dietrich Bonhoeffer, edited by Michael Mawson and Philip G. Ziegler (Oxford: Oxford University Press, 2019)
- Christ, Church and World: New Studies in Bonhoeffer's Theology and Ethics, edited by Michael Mawson and Philip G. Ziegler (London: T&T Clark, 2016)
- The Freedom of a Christian Ethicist: The Future of a Reformation Legacy, edited by Michael Mawson and Brian Brock (London: T&T Clark, 2016)
- Ontology and Ethics: Bonhoeffer and Contemporary Scholarship, edited by Michael Mawson and Adam C. Clark (Eugene: Pickwick, 2013)
