= First Presbyterian Church (Corpus Christi, Texas) =

Coordinates: 27.7886°N 97.3969°W

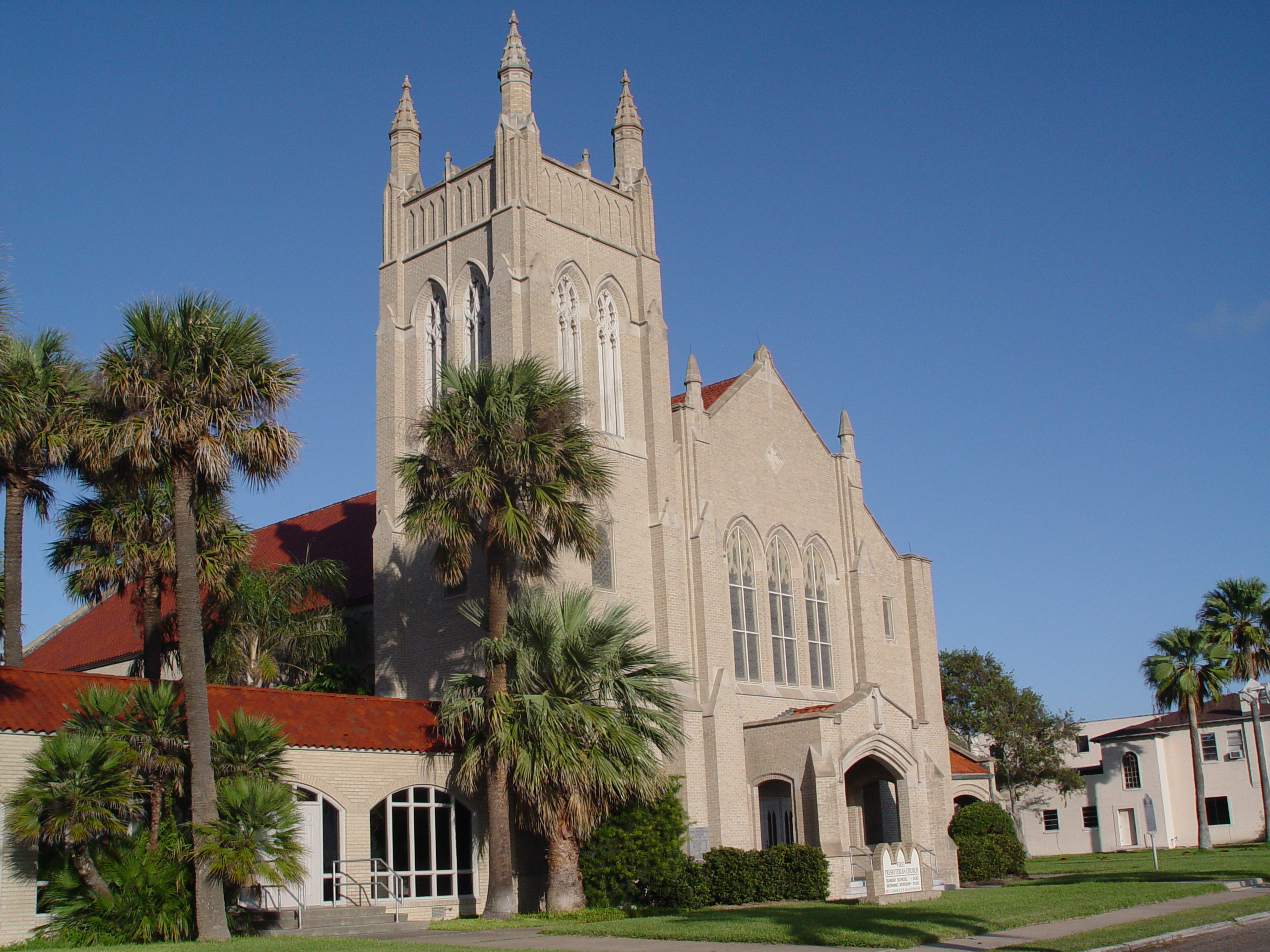
Front of First Presbyterian Church

The First Presbyterian Church is a Presbyterian church chartered in Corpus Christi, Texas in 1867. The congregation is a member of ECO: A Covenant Order of Evangelical Presbyterians.

== History ==
While there was an attempt to organize a Presbyterian Church in Corpus Christi as early as 1859, that congregation appears to have disbanded during the Civil War. The history of the current First Presbyterian dates to July 10, 1866 when several of the prominent citizens of the city, including the Rev. William Mitchell and his son, John B. Mitchell, Dr. E.T. Merriman, W.H. Maltby, Jacob Ziegler, George F. Evans, and L.D. Brewster, met at the little shell concrete and frame home of Texas patriot John Pollan to discuss building a Presbyterian Church in the young city, creating the Presbyterian Society. The primary aim of this group was to raise money for the construction of a Presbyterian Church. In December, 1866, Captain Richard King of the King Ranch donated land on the bluff, overlooking Corpus Christi Bay, as the site of the new church building.

On May 12, 1867, at the home of Dr. and Mrs. E.T. Merriman, the First Presbyterian Church of Corpus Christi was chartered by the Old School General Assembly of the old “northern” Presbyterian Church with seven members – six women and one man. Rev. William Mitchell became the first pastor and the charter members were John Pollan and his wife Mary, along with their daughters Mrs. Mary H. Mathis and Minerva V. Pollan, Mrs. Elizabeth Fusselman Merriman, Mrs. Mary J. Davis Fullerton, and Mrs. Sarah B. Mitchell, the minister's wife.

Construction materials were purchased for a building, but the yellow fever epidemic in the summer of 1867, which killed one-fifth of the city's population, stopped the work before it could start. The wooden construction materials were used instead to build coffins. By the time the epidemic was over the church had lost its minister and his infant grandson, Dr. Merriman, two members of the Pollan family, and the young son of Perry and Rachel Doddridge, their only child.

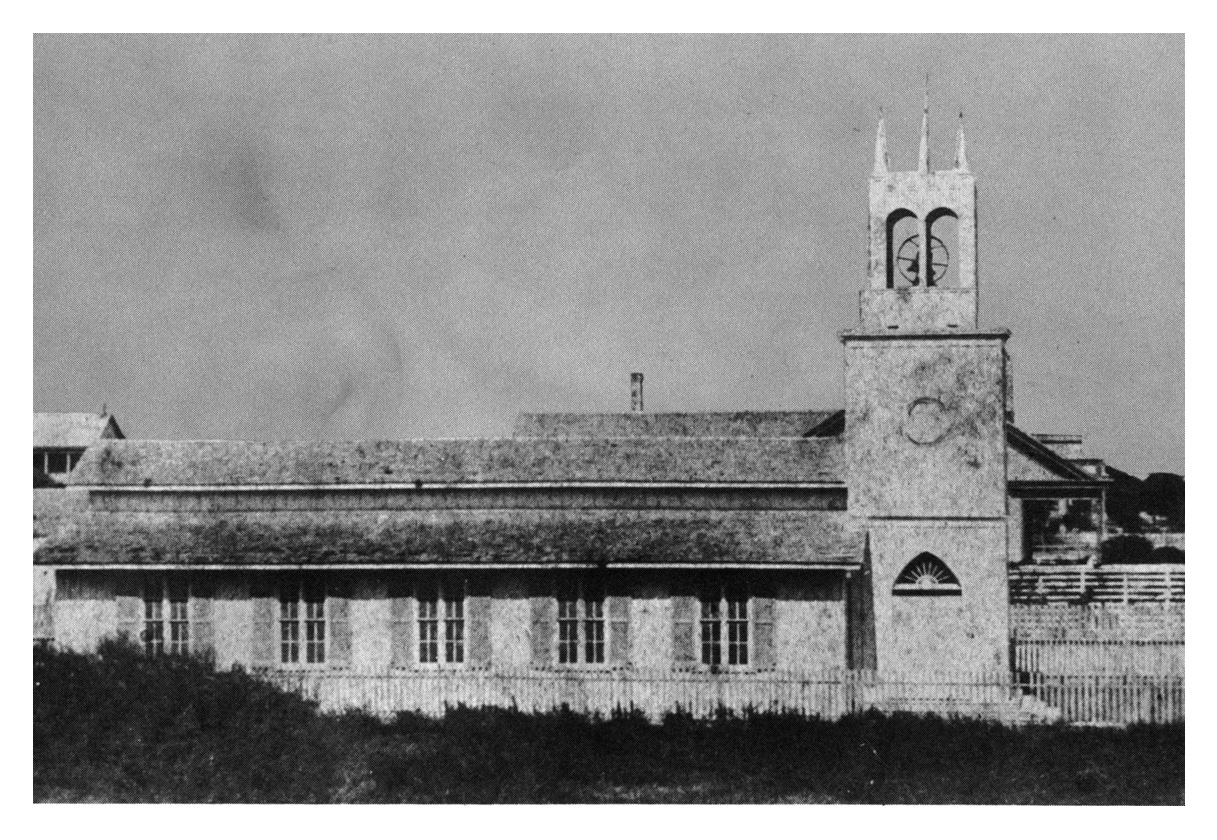
Original church building of First Presbyterian Church, begun in 1867

In 1868 the church's first building was standing, still without window panes or pews, and with only a dirt floor. In February, 1869 the congregation voted unanimously to apply for membership to the Presbytery of Newark, New Jersey, along with a request for assistance from the presbytery's Church Erection Board to complete the unfinished sanctuary. The presbytery responded with a loan of $600.

On March 11, 1872 the congregation voted to transfer its membership to the Presbytery of Western Texas of the Presbyterian Church in the US (the former “southern” church). The minister at the time, W.E. Caldwell, wrote, “This was done out of no unkind feeling to our northern brethren, but out of regard for the interests of Christ’s cause, as connected with the people here.” By 1875 the membership grew to fifty.

Two of the early ministers of the church married members of the church. The Rev. J.R. Jacobs, who served as the fifth pastor of the church from 1879-1884, married Nancy Caldwell, the only daughter of the Rev. W.E. Caldwell, the third minister to serve First Presbyterian. They were the first couple to live in the church's manse, which was completed in 1879 on land donated by Richard and Henrietta King. The Rev. J.R. Howerton, who served from 1885-1887, married Mary Fullerton, the daughter of charter member Mary J. Davis Fullerton. Corpus Christi was Howerton's first pastorate and he went on to serve as moderator of the General Assembly and as a professor of Mental and Moral Philosophy at Washington and Lee University. Howerton was also the founder of Montreat, the Presbyterian retreat center and college in North Carolina.

=== Second location ===
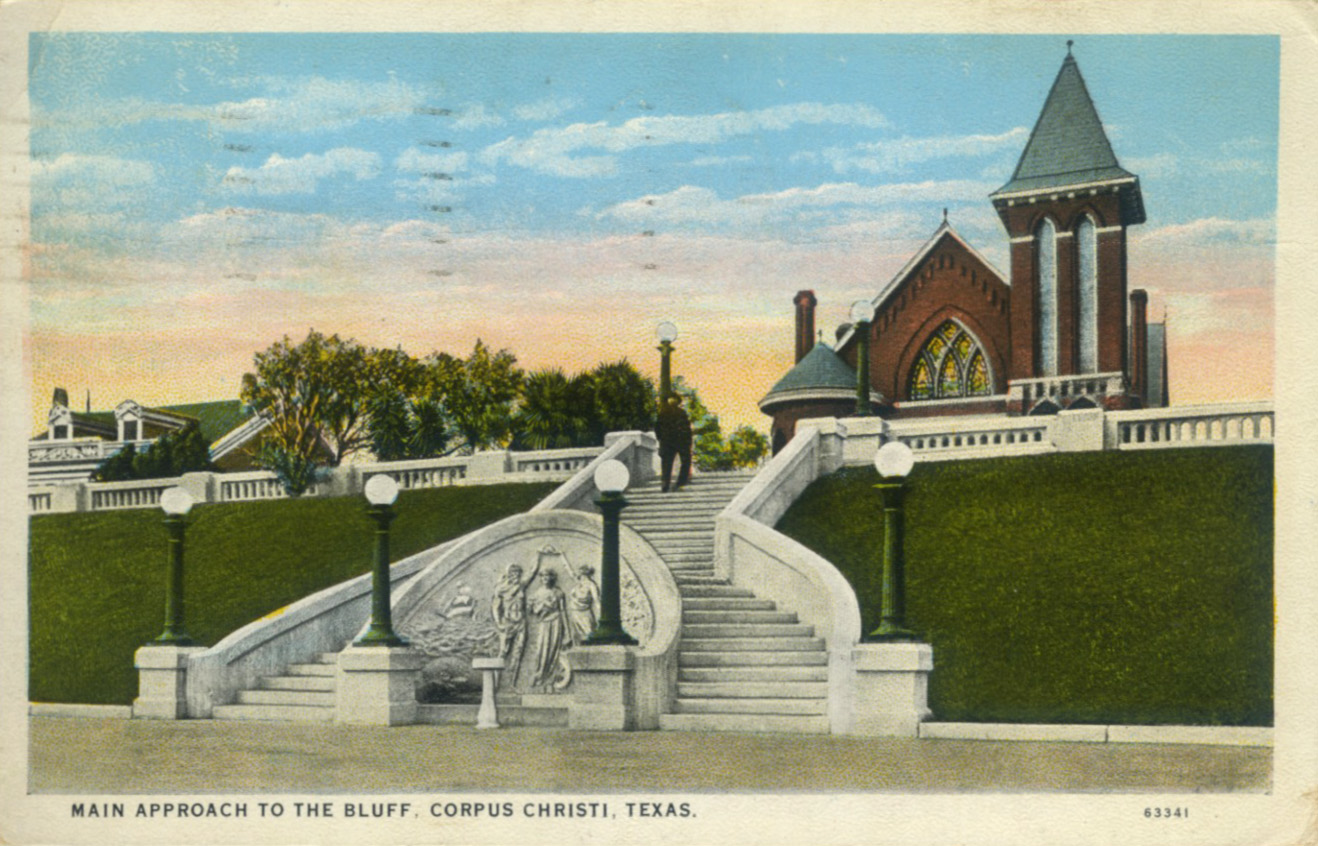
Postcard of second location of First Presbyterian Church

Early in the 1900s lots were purchased where the present Wells Fargo Tower, formerly the elegant Driscoll Hotel, is located. A handsome red brick structure was erected by Henrietta King, now a widow, in memory of her husband, Capt. Richard King, with a beautiful Tiffany stained glass windows in memory of her father, the Rev. Hiram Chamberlain, who had established the first Presbyterian church in South Texas at Brownsville in the 1850s. Following the disastrous hurricane and tidal wave of 1919, the Red Brick Church served as shelter and sustenance for the city. Members of the congregation worked from daylight until late at night at the church to help with relief, and the women of the church provided meals to about 700 people a day who had been left homeless by the storm.

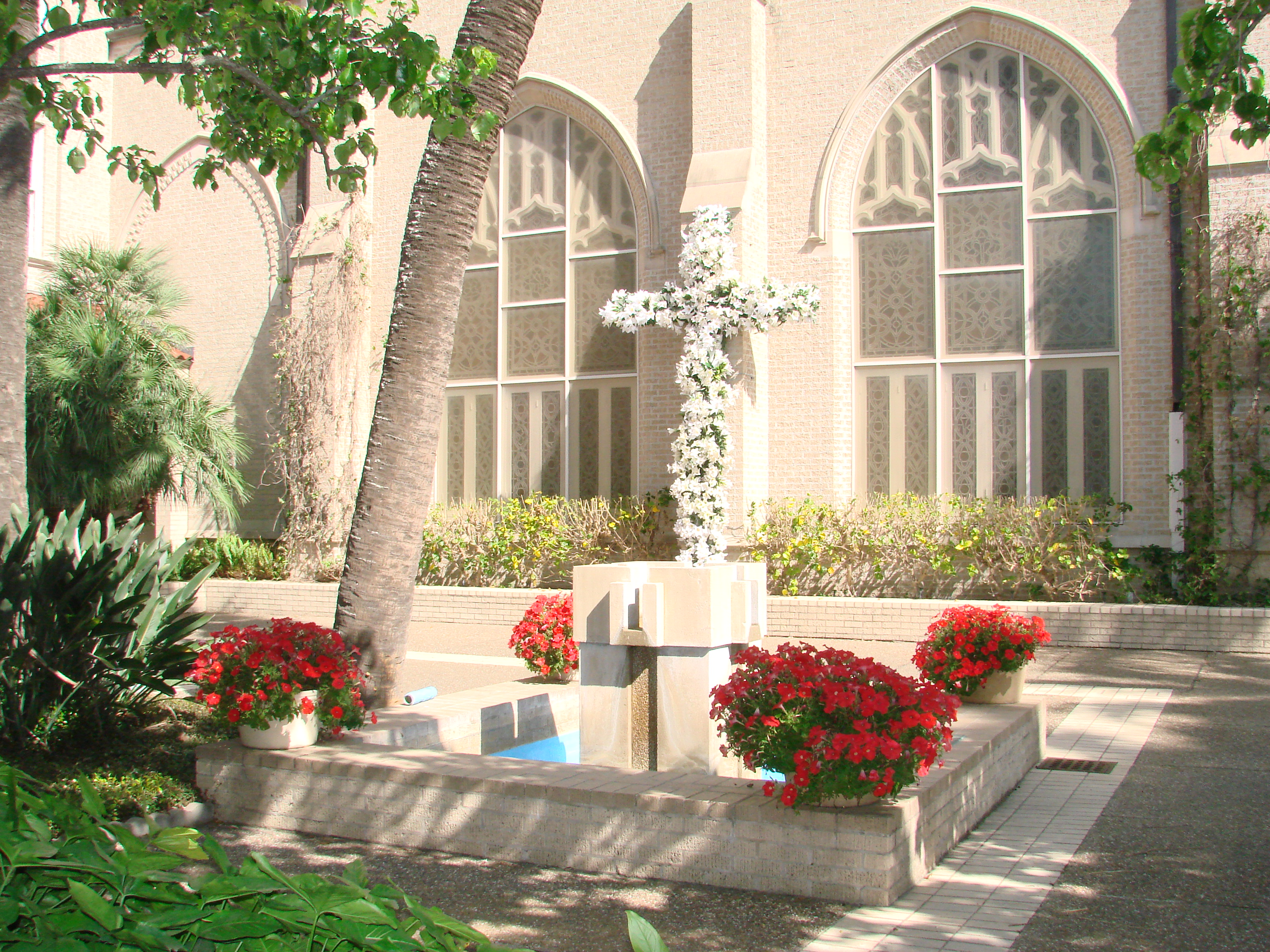
Courtyard of First Presbyterian Church, constructed in 1970

=== Third and current location ===
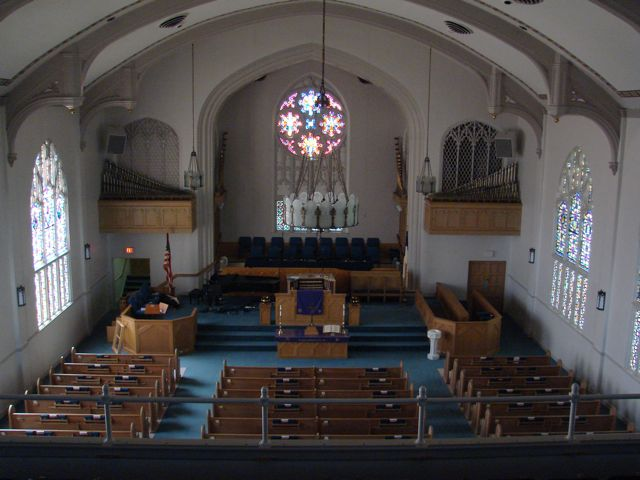
Sanctuary of First Presbyterian Church, viewed from balcony

In 1903, Mrs. Rachel Doddridge bequeathed her home on Upper Broadway to the church. In 1928, the Red Brick church on North Broadway was sold and a tabernacle was erected on the Doddridge estate as a place of worship while the present sanctuary was constructed during the pastorate of Dr. Charlton Storey. On August 17, 1930, the present sanctuary, designed by Dallas, Texas architect Wyatt C. Hedrick, was dedicated and the congregation moved into its present home. Dr. Storey, who had accepted a call the previous September to a church in North Carolina, returned to preach for the dedication. His morning sermon was titled, “The Sanctuary of God,” and the evening sermon, “The Open Door.” Combined attendance at the two services was over 2,000 and the other churches in town cancelled their evening services in order to participate.

One of the most remarkable features of the new sanctuary is the magnificent stained glass, a rare benefit of the Great Depression. Payne Studios of New Jersey was anxious to keep their artisans employed during the Depression and so the church was able to purchase the windows “at unbelievably attractive prices.”

Today, the three-story Doddridge building—constructed in memory of the Doddridge family—contains the church’s offices, choir rooms, library, chapel, children’s Sunday School classrooms, and dormitories for visiting mission groups.
