= First Presbyterian Church (Mount Holly, New Jersey) =

- First Presbyterian Church of Mount Holly
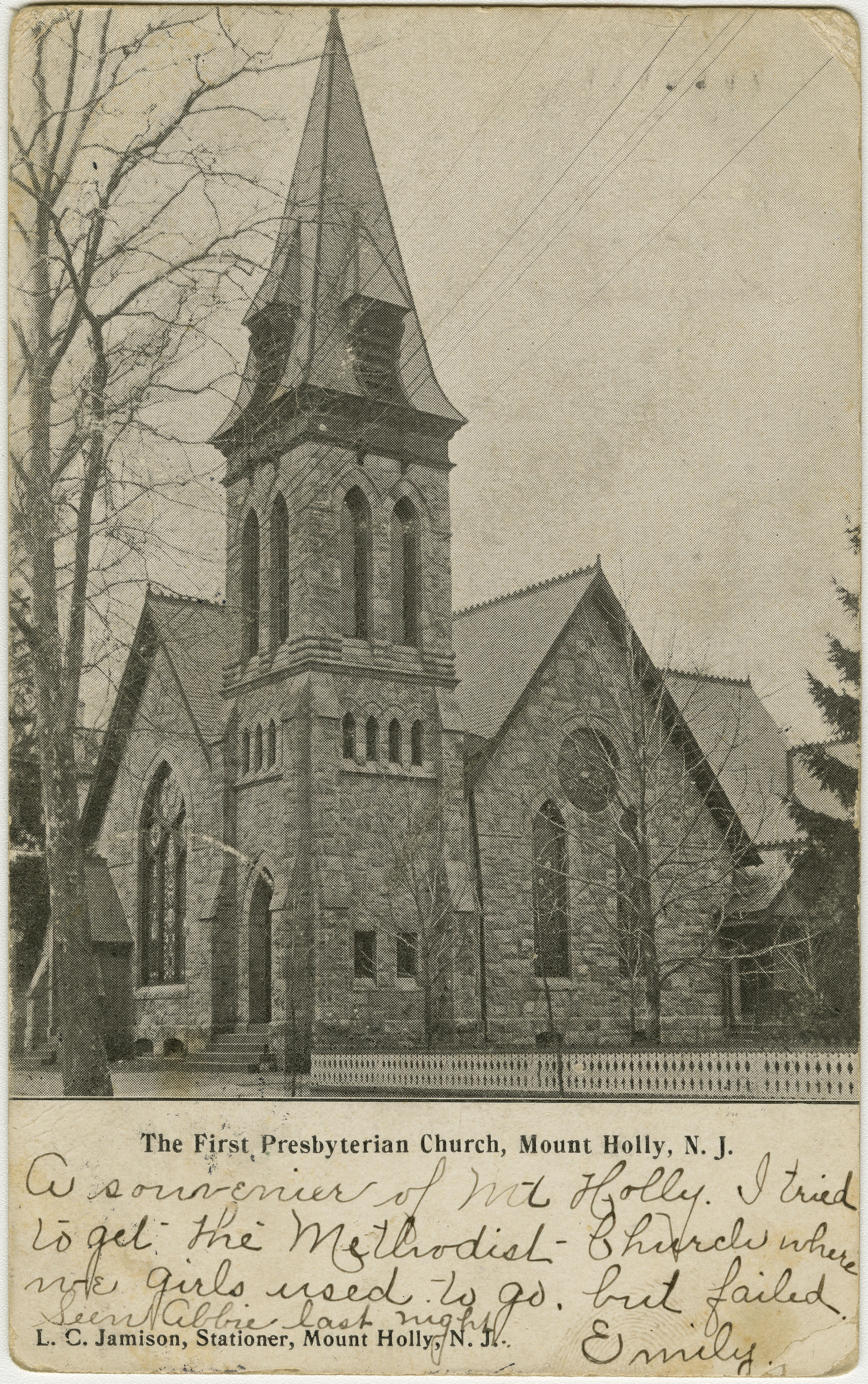
- A historic postcard of the church
- First Presbyterian Church
- Location: 125 Garden Street, Mount Holly, New Jersey
- Country: United States
- Denomination: ECO: A Covenant Order of Evangelical Presbyterians
- Previous denomination: Presbyterian Church (U.S.A.)
- Churchmanship: Evangelical
- Website: firstpresmtholly.org

History
- Founded: 27 October 1839

Architecture
- Style: Gothic Revival
- Completed: 1887
- Mount Holly Historic District
- U.S. National Register of Historic Places
- U.S. Historic district – Contributing property
- Location within Burlington County, New Jersey
- Coordinates: 39°59′48.9″N 74°47′06.2″W
- NRHP reference No.: 73001084
- Added to NRHP: February 20, 1973

First Presbyterian Church of Mount Holly is a historic congregation in Mount Holly, New Jersey, founded in 1839.

== History ==
The congregation's roots date back over seventy years before its official founding. John Brainerd led the first Presbyterian worship services in the town from 1767 to 1776, followed by the Rev. John Plotts, who hosted the services in the upper floor of his academy. The first building, dedicated December 17, 1845, was replaced by the current structure in 1887. The site is above an underground river, which has been the source of some difficulties. Expansions to provide classroom space, a gymnasium, and offices took place in 1925 and 1957.

On November 1, 2013, after 154 years as part of the Monmouth Presbytery of the Presbyterian Church (U.S.A.) and its predecessor denominations, First Presbyterian was received into ECO: A Covenant Order of Evangelical Presbyterians. The decision to move to the newly created, more Evangelical, denomination was taken after two years of prayer, study, and discernment.

== Theology ==
The congregation identifies itself as having held to two principal commitments during its history, Evangelical theology and service to those in need. It states that:

[First Presbyterian Church of Mount Holly] has always held tightly to an orthodox Christian belief, stressing Evangelical theology and a high view of scripture. The Bible was considered to be the Word of God. Scripture was read, taught and lived out to bring glory to Jesus... The church has created a number of outreach ministries in the community from a nursing home, to a caring center, the community luncheon, the Well counseling center, the Burlington Center Mall Ministry, Homes of Hope and others.
