= First Presbyterian Church (Tacoma, Washington) =

- First Presbyterian Church of Tacoma
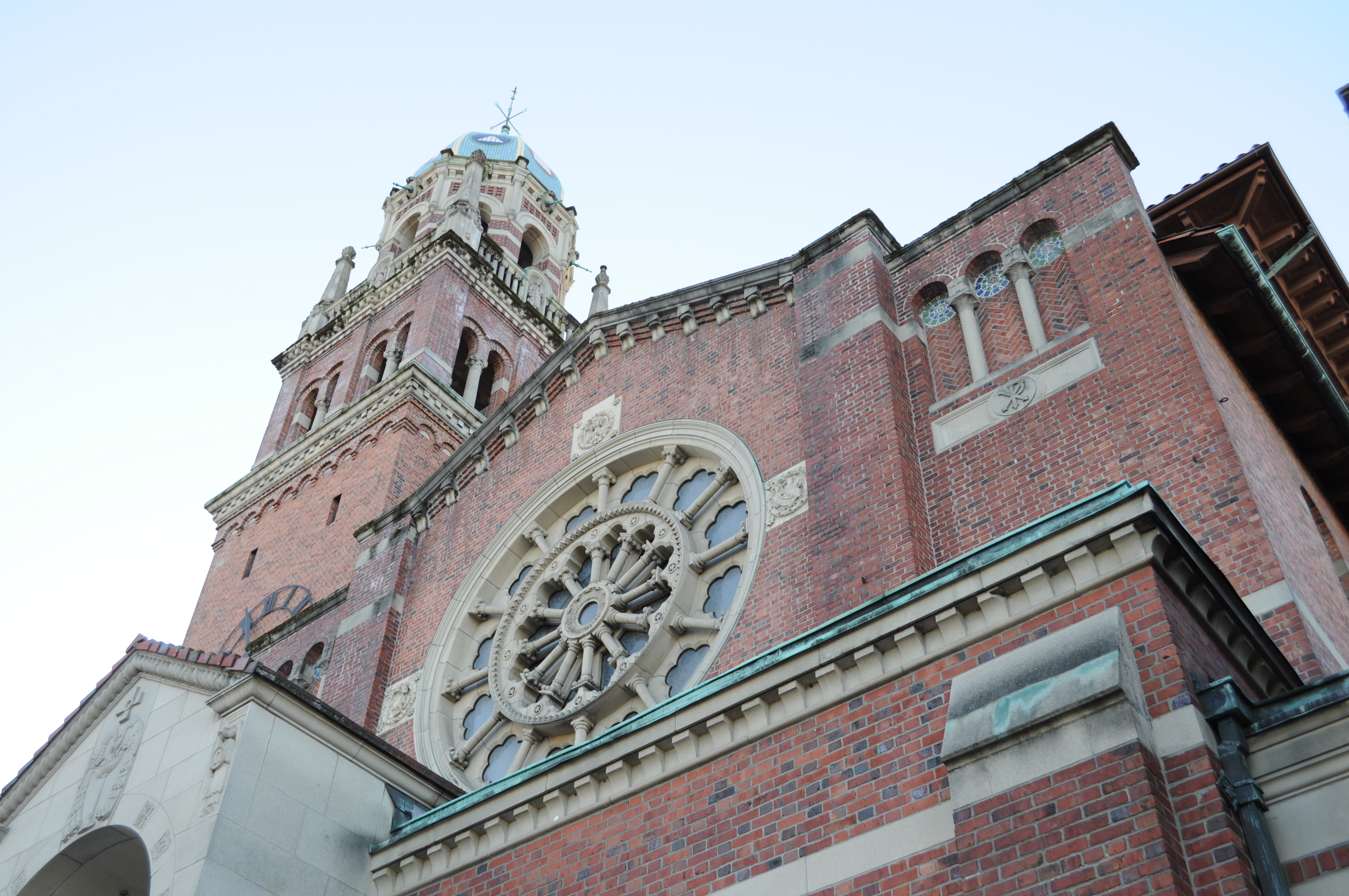

- Location within Washington (state)
- 47°15′47.6″N 122°26′50.3″W
- Location: 20 Tacoma Avenue South, Tacoma, Washington
- Country: United States
- Denomination: ECO: A Covenant Order of Evangelical Presbyterians
- Previous denomination: Presbyterian Church (U.S.A.)
- Churchmanship: Evangelical
- Website: fpctacoma.org

History
- Founded: July, 1873

Architecture
- Architect: Ralph Adams Cram
- Style: Romanesque Revival
- Completed: 1925
- Construction cost: $500,000, equivalent to $9,179,000 in 2025

Specifications
- Height: 165 feet (50 m) (tower)

First Presbyterian Church in Tacoma, Washington is a historic congregation founded in 1873. Its current Romanesque building was designed by noted church architect Ralph Adams Cram, Mr. Earl N. Dugan (Sutton, Whitney and Dugan), who was locally in charge of construction, completed in 1925, and is a landmark of the Stadium District. In 2012 the church voted to leave the Presbyterian Church (U.S.A.) and affiliate with the more Evangelical, ECO: A Covenant Order of Evangelical Presbyterians. The church is adjacent to Tacoma Bible Presbyterian Church, which split off of First Presbyterian in 1935 and purchased the neighboring Scottish Rite Masonic Temple which fronts on the Wright Park Arboretum.

== Architecture ==
The building was designed in the Romaneque revival style and features detailed architectural elements including terrazzo floors, ornamental iron work, and a Ludowici tile roof.

=== Tower ===
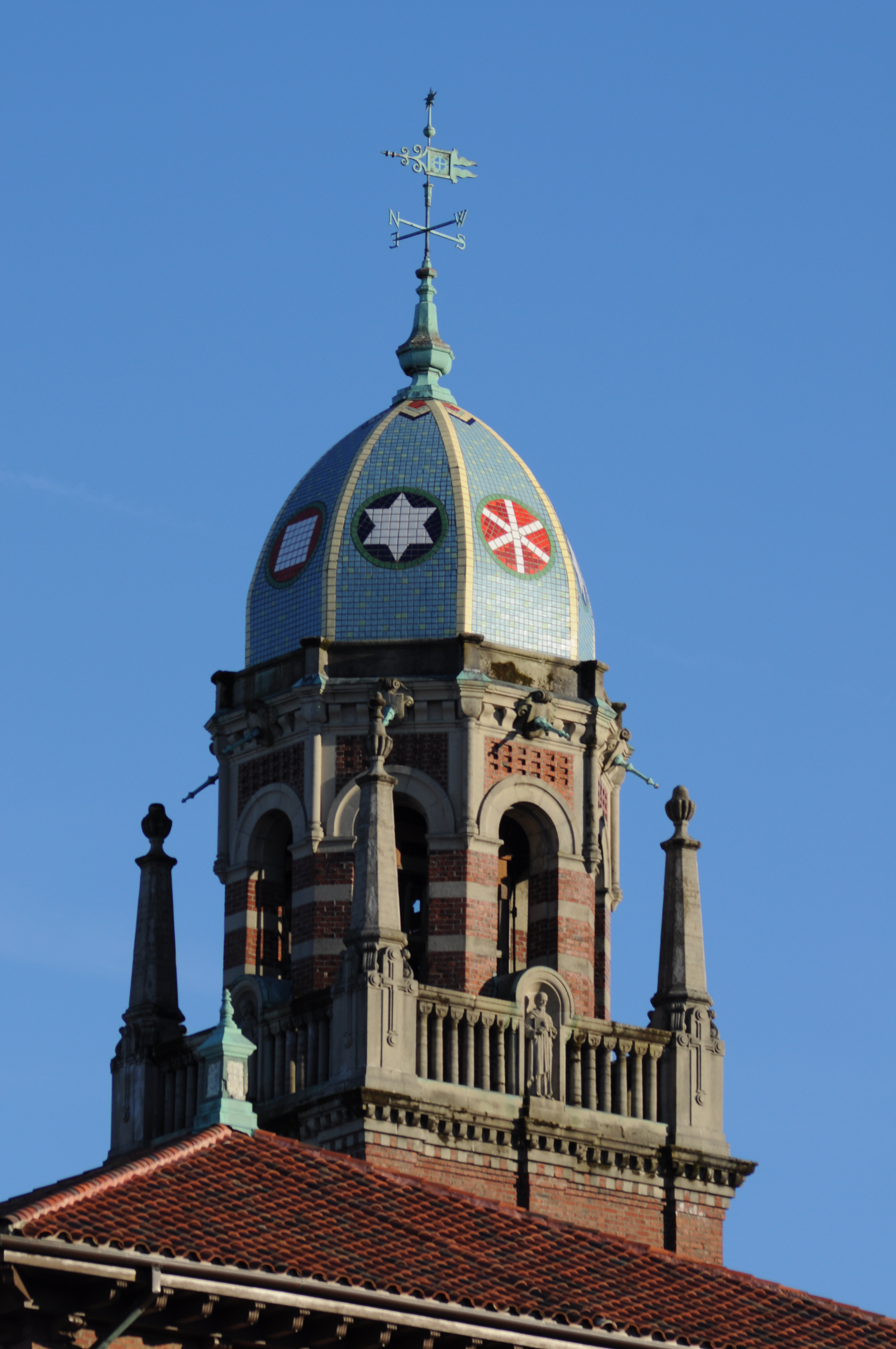

The architect, Ralph Adams Cram, was a fervent Anglo-Catholic and devoted to imbuing his designs with rich symbolism. This is most visible at First Presbyterian in the decoration of the tower, which in earlier times served as a landmark for ships approaching the Port of Tacoma. It is 22 feet (6.7 m) by 26 feet (7.9 m) wide and 165 feet (50 m) tall. The tower houses a two-octave set of chimes, made by J.C. Deagan Company of Chicago, and the balustrade has a niche in the center of each side with a statue of one of the Four Evangelists. Each side of the octagonal dome bears a Christian symbol:

Direction	Symbol	Image	Meaning
North	Square		Eternal life
Northeast	Triangle		The Trinity
East	Greek Cross		The Crucifixion of Jesus
Southeast	Star of Beauty		The Five wounds of Christ
South	Triquetra		The Trinity
Southwest	Seven-pointed star		Biblical sevens: Seven churches, Seven seals, Seven trumpets, etc...
West	IX monogram		Greek initials of Jesus Christ surrounded by a circle symbolizing eternity
Northwest	Six-pointed star		The Creator
