= Hugh T. Kerr =

American Reformed theologian (1909–1992)

- Born: Hugh Thomson Kerr Jr. July 1, 1909; Chicago, Illinois, US
- Died: March 27, 1992 (aged 82)
- Other name: Tim Kerr
- Spouse: Dorothy (m. c. 1938; died 1981)

Academic background
- Education: Princeton University; Western Theological Seminary; University of Edinburgh

Academic work
- Discipline: Theology
- School or tradition: Reformed Protestantism
- Institutions: Princeton Theological Seminary

Hugh Thomson Kerr Jr. (1909–1992) was an American Reformed theologian. He was the Benjamin B. Warfield Professor of Theology at Princeton Theological Seminary from 1950 to 1974.

Born July 1, 1909, in Chicago, Illinois, Kerr was a graduate of Princeton University, Western Theological Seminary, and University of Edinburgh.

He was closely associated with the journal Theology Today from the time of its establishment in 1944, becoming its senior editor in 1950.

Kerr was a Guggenheim fellow in 1960.

Academic offices
Preceded by Thomas F. Torrance	Warfield Lecturer; 1982	Succeeded by Jane Dempsey Douglass
