= The History of Scottish Theology =

2019 essay collection

First editions

The History of Scottish Theology is a three-volume collection of essays published by Oxford University Press in 2019 and edited by David Fergusson and Mark W. Elliott.
