= Christ Presbyterian Church (Edina, Minnesota) =

Presbyterian Church in Edina, Minnesota

Coordinates: 44°52′38″N 93°20′56.5″W

Christ Presbyterian Church (CPC) in Edina, Minnesota, United States, is a congregation within ECO: A Covenant Order of Evangelical Presbyterians with 5,388 members in 2012. CPC was founded in 1956. During Roger Anderson's ministry, the church began to grow rapidly. CPC became the largest Presbyterian congregation in the upper Midwest, and one of the largest Presbyterian churches in the nation, with membership passing 1,700. The former senior pastor, John Crosby, led CPC to be a congregation of over 5,000. In 2006, the church celebrated the 50th anniversary. The church was a leader in the movement to establish ECO as a breakaway movement from the Presbyterian Church (USA).
