= Samuel Martin Thompson =

American philosopher

- Born: March 10, 1902; Mays, Indiana
- Died: June 20, 1983 (aged 81); Monmouth, Illinois
- Burial place: Warren County Memorial Park Cemetery, Illinois

Education
- Education: Monmouth College; Princeton University

Philosophical work
- School: Reformed Scholasticism
- Notable works: Confession of 1967; A Modern Philosophy of Religion (Henry Regnery Company, 1955); The Nature of Philosophy, An Introduction (Holt, Rinehart and Winston, 1961)

Samuel Martin Thompson (1901–1983) was an American philosopher, frequent contributor to scholarly journals and author of three bestselling textbooks of philosophy. His textbooks were used by many top universities and seminaries in the United States. An expert on the works of philosopher Immanuel Kant, he published analyses of Kant's work. Thompson was also one of the three authors of the Confession of 1967, one of the major statements of faith of the Presbyterian Church (USA).

== Biography ==
Born March 10, 1902, in Mays, Indiana, he was the first son of Alice Martin Thompson and the Reverend Robert Thompson, an 1894 graduate of Monmouth College of Illinois. He graduated from high school in Des Moines, Iowa. Following in the footsteps of his father, Samuel graduated from Monmouth College in 1924 with a Bachelor of Arts degree in English. He went on to earn the M.A. degree in 1925 and Ph.D. degree in Philosophy in 1931 from Princeton University.

He returned to Monmouth College and served as a professor in the Philosophy Department for 46 years. He was also elected President of the Illinois Philosophy Conference.

== Publications ==
He was a frequent contributor to scholarly journals including The Journal of Philosophy, Philosophy of Science, The Journal of Religion, The Review of Metaphisics, Ethics, Modern Age, The Personalist, and The International Philosophical Quarterly. He also wrote the article on Immanuel Kant for The New Century Cyclopedia of Names and a chapter of the book The Heritage of Kant.

Most notable among his publications were two popular textbooks. A Modern Philosophy of Religion (Henry Regnery Company, 1955) became a widely used text book at colleges and universities including Amherst College, Cornell University, Temple University, the University of Nebraska, Oberlin College, Yale Divinity School, the University of Kansas, Drew University, the University of Pittsburgh, St. Olaf College, Syracuse University, Garrett Theological Seminary and others. His second text, The Nature of Philosophy, An Introduction (Holt, Rinehart and Winston, 1961) was also widely adopted for use in introductory courses in philosophy. He also wrote A Study of Locke's Theory of Ideas based on his dissertation at Princeton University. All three of these texts remained available in print well into the 21st century.

In 1957, the General Assembly of the United Presbyterian Church authorized the appointment of a committee to consider a new statement of faith. Thompson was the only layman among the fifteen members of the Committee on a Brief Contemporary Statement of Faith, serving as its secretary. He was one of three members of the committee responsible for drafting the document that was adopted by the church as the Confession of 1967.

== Approach to the Collegiate Professorship ==
In a 1973 Modern Age journal article, Thompson summarized his theories about collegiate professorship with the challenging notions of,

"It is the business of the college professor to interpret his discipline to the learner in terms of the learner's awareness."

and his philosophical direction of,

"In the realm of knowledge there is only one test. That test is more knowledge. This is the case because all knowledge of fact and existence is conditional. The leading edge of our knowledge is always problematic. The criterion of more knowledge is the only alternative I know to authoritarian dogma."

He went on to emphasize the role of the professorship in protecting the discipline as,

"We need always to remember, however, and to remind those who forget, that our role is a mediating one. The civilizers of men are the disciplines which are in our care, and in our care alone. Our task is to build roads of access to these disciplines for each new generation. The constant concern of each of us must be to protect the integrity of his discipline from any who would pollute it to satisfy the enemies of knowledge, or dilute it for the sake of popularity, or cheapen it to titillate the vulgar."

== Burial and Honors ==
He died June 20, 1983, in Monmouth and was buried at Warren County Memorial Park Cemetery. He was so revered at Monmouth College that a student society (club) was named in his honor and remained active, as of 2015. An essay contest and lecture series are named after him and continue as of 2026.
