= Haruko Nawata Ward =

21st-century ecclesiastical historian

The Reverend Haruko Nawata Ward

Ecclesiastical career
- Religion: Christianity (Presbyterian)
- Church: Presbyterian Church (USA)
- Ordained: c. 2003

Academic background
- Education: Tokyo University of Fine Arts and Music; New York University; Southeastern Baptist Theological Seminary; Princeton Theological Seminary
- Thesis: Women and the Jesuits in the Christian Century (1549–1650) in Japan (2001)
- Doctoral advisor: Jane Dempsey Douglass

Academic work
- Discipline: History
- Sub-discipline: Ecclesiastical history
- School or tradition: Feminism
- Institutions: Columbia Theological Seminary

Haruko Nawata Ward is a religious historian currently teaching church history at Columbia Theological Seminary. She is known primarily for her work on women religious leaders, history of Christianity in Asia, history of the Christian Reformation, encounter of cultures and religions and justice issues throughout the history of the church.

== Career ==
Ward received a BFA from Tokyo University of Fine Arts and Music (1976), a MA from the Graduate School of Arts and Sciences of New York University (1980), a MDiv from Southeastern Baptist Theological Seminary (1983), a ThM (1993) and a PhD (2001) from Princeton Theological Seminary. During her time here she served as a Teaching Fellow and an occasional lecturer (1996–2001). She was ordained as a minister of the Word and Sacrament in the Presbyterian Church (USA) and began teaching at Columbia Theological Seminary as the assistant professor of Church History (2002-2008) and then associate professor of Church History (2008–2016). She is currently the Professor of Church History at Columbia Theological Seminary.

== Thought ==
Ward, "a self-proclaimed feminist historian," is most widely known for her research on women throughout the history of the Christian church who have been largely ignored, especially in Asia. She states the "social historians have surveyed the activities of lay Kirishitan male leaders, but not paid attention to their female counterparts." In this research Ward seeks to re-emphasize the voice of women throughout history and to reinterpret Christian history through these voices. Additionally, her work also seeks to reveal how the "Christian mission had a significant cultural and social impact on Japan" throughout its history.

== Works ==
- Women Religious Leaders of Japan’s Christian Century: 1549–1650. Series Women and Gender in the Early Modern World. Aldershot, England; Burlington, VT: Ashgate Publishing, 2009.(Nominated for Gordon Book Prize from the Renaissance Society of America in 2009.)
- Christian Theology of Martyrdom and Women Martyrs in Early Modern Japan (In Progress).
