= James Franklin Kay =

Professor, author and editor of Homiletics

- Born: May 18, 1948 (age 78); Kansas City, Missouri, U.S.
- Occupation: Retired academic
- Title: Joe R. Engle Professor of Homiletics and Liturgics Emeritus; Dean and Vice President of Academic Affairs Emeritus

Academic background
- Education: Union Theological Seminary
- Thesis: Christ our contemporary : Rudolf Bultmann's "Christus praesens" in retrospect and prospect (1991)

Academic work
- Discipline: Theologian

James Franklin Kay (born May 18, 1948) is the Joe R. Engle Professor of Homiletics and Liturgics Emeritus, and Dean and Vice President of Academic Affairs Emeritus at Princeton Theological Seminary.

== Biography ==
Born in Kansas City, Missouri, Kay earned a B.A. at Pasadena College (presently named Point Loma Nazarene University), San Diego, California, in 1969; an M.Div. at Harvard University, Cambridge, Massachusetts in 1972; an M.Phil. and a Ph.D. at Union Theological Seminary, New York City, New York in 1984 and 1991 respectively.

Interrupting his studies at Harvard, Kay spent the academic year 1970-1971 at St. Mary's College of the University of St. Andrews, in St. Andrews, Scotland, United Kingdom. Later, during the summers of 1976 and 1977 he undertook graduate work in liturgical studies at St. John’s University in Collegeville, Minnesota.

On May 1, 1975, Kay was ordained as a Presbyterian Minister by the Presbytery of Red River in the former United Presbyterian Church in the United States of America (UPCUSA). Between 1974 and 1978 he was the pastor of the Northern Lakes Parish (UPCUSA) in Beltrami County, Minnesota, and between 1977 and 1979 he also acted as the United Ministries in Higher Education (UMHE) campus minister at Bemidji State University at Bemidji, Minnesota. Since 1980 he has been a member of the Presbytery of New York City of the Presbyterian Church (U.S.A.). During the year 1993, Kay was the exchange senior minister at Toorak Uniting Church, in Melbourne, Australia.

In 1981, while a student at Union, and in consultation with the Rev. William Sloane Coffin, senior pastor of the Riverside Church, New York City, Kay authored what became known as the ("augmented") Riverside baptismal formula: "In the name of the Father and of the Son and of the Holy Spirit, one God, Mother of us all," derived from the classical axiom that the ad extra works of the Persons of the Trinity are indivisible and based on Julian of Norwich's insight that Jesus Christ exercises the ministry of "Mother" towards the faithful.

Kay's thirty-year tenure at Princeton Theological Seminary was marked by his chairing the Miller Chapel Renovation Committee (1995-2000) for the oldest house of worship in continuous use in the former Borough of Princeton, New Jersey. He also oversaw the designing of Scheide Hall in conjunction with Ford, Farewell, Mills, and Gatch, Architects, and the selection of the Paul Fritts Organ donated by the American philanthropist, Joe R. Engle. From 2002-2014, Kay directed the Joe R. Engle Institute of Preaching, securing for its work significant grants and endowments, and widening its outreach to Spanish-speaking pastors.

In 2010, Kay was appointed the Seminary's Dean of Academic Affairs by then President (now Sir) Iain R. Torrance. Following President Torrance's retirement at the end of 2012, he continued to serve until his own retirement in 2018, under President M. Craig Barnes, with the additional title of Vice President of Academic Affairs. In this role, Dean Kay assisted the Seminary with its inter-institutional relations with Princeton University and Rutgers University, as well as with several overseas partnerships authorized by President Barnes. They included the Inter American University of Puerto Rico, Presbyterian University and Theological Seminary in Korea, Yonsei University in Korea, Faculdade Unida, a graduate school of theology and religion, in Brazil, and the renewing of contacts with theological faculties in Cuba, Costa Rica, Ghana, Nigeria, and South Africa.

Kay has edited the journals The Princeton Seminary Bulletin (1994-2000) and Theology Today (2005-2010). As editor of the latter, he initiated its transformation from an American print journal to an international electronic journal in cooperation with SAGE publications. He has also lectured widely on the history, theology, and practice of Christian worship and preaching, as well as on homiletical theories—both those emerging from antiquity and from the post-Enlightenment era. In 1997, Kay was the Forrester/Warrack Lecturer at St. Andrews University, Scotland. From 2012-2018, he served on the Executive Committee of the American Theological Society.

== Career at Princeton Theological Seminary ==
James Kay has held the following positions at Princeton Theological Seminary:

- Instructor in Homiletics (1988–1991)
- Assistant Professor of Homiletics (1991–1995)
- Associate Professor of Homiletics and Liturgics (1995–1997)
- Joe R. Engle Associate Professor of Homiletics and Liturgics (1997–2001)
- Chair of the Practical Theology Department (2001–2005)
- Joe R. Engle Professor of Homiletics and Liturgics (2001–2018)
- Director of the Joe R. Engle Institute of Preaching (2002–2014)
- Dean of Academic Affairs (2010–2013)
- Dean and Vice President of Academic Affairs (2013-2018)
- Joe R. Engle Professor of Homiletics and Liturgics Emeritus (2018)
- Dean and Vice President of Academic Affairs Emeritus (2018)

On November 17, 2000 James Kay was awarded the Alumnus of Point Loma (APL) Award by Point Loma Nazarene University. In March 2012, in conjunction with the Centenary of the Inter American University of Puerto Rico, he was honored by its Trustees with a special Resolution of Appreciation.

== Works ==
=== Books ===
- Kay, James Franklin (1994). Christus Præsens: A Reconsideration of Rudolf Bultmann's Christology. Grand Rapids, MI: Eerdmanns. ISBN 0-8028-0131-5.
- ——— (2007). Preaching and Theology. St. Louis: Chalice Press. ISBN 978-0-8272-2991-4.
- ——— (2005) [1994]. Seasons of Grace: Reflections from the Christian Year. Grand Rapids, Eugene: Eerdmanns, Wipf and Stock. ISBN 0-8028-0783-6.

=== Edited book and journal issues ===
- ———, ed. (1995). "Special Issue: Book of Common Worship (1993)". The Princeton Seminary Bulletin. 16 (new) (2). Princeton: Princeton Theological Seminary. ISSN 0032-8413.
- ———, ed. (1995). "Special Issue Honoring J. Christiaan Beker". The Princeton Seminary Bulletin. 16 (new) (1). Princeton: Princeton Theological Seminary. ISSN 0032-8413.
- ———, ed. (1999). "Special Issue Honoring Jane Dempsey Douglass". The Princeton Seminary Bulletin. 20 (new) (1). Princeton: Princeton Theological Seminary. ISSN 0032-8413.
- ———, ed. (1996). "A Special Issue on Preaching in Honor of Conrad H. Massa". The Princeton Seminary Bulletin. 17 (new) (2). Princeton: Princeton Theological Seminary. ISSN 0032-8413.
- ———; Douglass, Jane Dempsey, eds. (1997). Women, Gender, and Christian Community. Louisville: Westminster, John Knox Press. ISBN 0-664-25728-3.

=== Selected book chapters and journal articles ===
- ——— (1997). "Becoming Visible: Baptism, Women, and the Church". In Douglass, Jane Dempsey; Kay, James (eds.). Women, Gender, and Christian Community. Louisville: Westminster, John Knox Press. pp. 92–103. ISBN 0-664-25728-3.
- ——— (2008). "Blackduck". In Cole, Jr., Allan Hugh (ed.). From Midterms to Ministry: Practical Theologians on Pastoral Beginnings. Grand Rapids: Eerdmanns. pp. 51–64. ISBN 978-0-8028-4002-8.
- ——— (2004). "He Descended into Hell". In van Harn, Roger E. (ed.). Exploring and Proclaiming the Apostles' Creed. Grand Rapids: Eerdmanns. pp. 117–129. ISBN 0-8028-2120-0.
- ——— (1996). "Homosexuality: What Then Shall We Preachers Say?". In Seow, Choon-Leong (ed.). Homosexuality and Christian Community. Louisville: Westminster, John Knox Press. pp. 99–109. ISBN 0-664-25664-3.
- ——— (1993). "In Whose Name? Feminism and the Trinitarian Baptismal Formula". Theology Today. 49 (4). Ephrata: Science Press: 524–533. doi:10.1177/004057369304900409. ISSN 0040-5736. S2CID 170967138. Archived from the original on 24 November 2011.
- ——— (1999). "The Lex Orandi in Recent Protestant Theology". In Cunningham, David S.; del Colle, Ralph; Lamadrid, Lucas (eds.). Ecumenical Theology in Worship, Doctrine and Life: Essays Presented to Geoffrey Wainwright on His Sixtieth Birthday. New York: Oxford University Press. pp. 11–23. ISBN 0-19-513136-3.
- ——— (1991). "Myth or Narrative? Bultmann's New Testament and Narrative Turns Fifty". Theology Today. 48 (3). Ephrata: Science Press: 326–332. doi:10.1177/004057369104800306. ISSN 0040-5736. S2CID 170784777. Archived from the original on 24 November 2011.
- ——— (1999). "The New Rites of Baptism: A Dogmatic Assessment". In Spinks, Bryan D.; Torrance, Iain (eds.). To Glorify God: Essays on Modern Reformed Liturgy. Edinburgh, Grand Rapids, MI: T & T Clark, Eerdmanns. pp. 201–212. ISBN 0-567-08606-2.
- ——— (2019). "The Place of Prayer in Theological Method: A Conversation with Sarah Coakley". In Fergusson, David; McCormack, Bruce (eds.). In Schools of Faith: Essays on Theology, Ethics and Education in Honour of Iain R. Torrance. London: T & T Clark. pp. 117–127. ISBN 978-0-567-66793-9.
- ——— (2010). "Preacher as Messenger of Hope". In Read, Robert Stephen (ed.). Slow of Speech and Unclean Lips: Contemporary Images of Preaching Identity. Eugene, OR: Cascade Books. pp. 13–34. ISBN 978-1-60608-521-9.
- ——— (1998). "Preaching at the Turn of the Ages". St. Mary's College Bulletin. 40 (Spring). St. Andrews: St. Andrews University: 64–78. Warrack Lecture.
- ——— (2018). "Promissory Kerygmatics". In Jacobsen, David Schnasa (ed.). Toward a Homiletical Theology of Promise. Eugene, OR: Cascade Books. pp. 87–105. ISBN 978-1-532-61391-3.
- ——— (2000). "Pulpit Eloquence and Its Pauline Strictures: The Triumph of Rhetoric in Modern Homiletical Theory". Papers of the Annual Meeting. The Academy of Homiletics: 173–184.
- ——— (2001). "The Renovation of Miller Chapel". The Princeton Seminary Bulletin. 22 (new) (1). Princeton: Princeton Theological Seminary: 16–32. ISSN 0032-8413.
- ——— (2003). "Reorientation: Homiletics as Theologically Authorized Rhetoric". The Princeton Seminary Bulletin. 24 (new) (1). Princeton: Princeton Theological Seminary: 16–35. ISSN 0032-8413. Inaugural address at Princeton Theological Seminary.
- ——— (2003). "Rudolf Bultmann (1884-1976)". In Hastings, Adrian; Mason, Alistair (eds.). Key Thinkers in Christianity. New York: Oxford University Press. pp. 140–146. ISBN 0-19-280279-8.
- ——— (1999). "The Word of the Cross at the Turn of the Ages". Interpretation. 53 (1). Richmond: Union Theological Seminary: 44–56. doi:10.1177/002096439905300105. ISSN 0020-9643. S2CID 170430169.
- ——— (2001). "2 Cor 4:3-6; 2 Cor 4:5-12; 2 Cor 4:13-5:1; 2 Cor 5:6-17; 2 Cor 5:16-21; 2 Cor 6:1-13". In van Harn, Roger E. (ed.). The Lectionary Commentary: Theological Exegesis for Sunday's Texts vol.2, The Second Readings: Acts and the Epistles. Grand Rapids, MI; London: Eerdmanns, Continuum. pp. 243–264. ISBN 0-8028-4752-8.
