= Brief Statement of Faith =

American Presbyterian confession of faith

The Brief Statement of Faith is a statement of faith adopted by the Presbyterian Church (USA) in 1991 as part of its Book of Confessions.

The statement was forged during the union of the United Presbyterian Church in the United States of America and the Presbyterian Church in the United States in the formation of the Presbyterian Church (USA). Although Reformed in its origins, the preface to the statement explicitly notes its universal intention: "This statement therefore intends to confess the catholic faith." As such, the statement is internally organized with an ecumenical, and Trinitarian structure, having both a reformed and Protestant flavor with regard to soteriology and yet remains sensitive to contemporary concerns such as gendered language of God, sexism, racism, and care of creation and the environment. The tone and content of the statement strongly parallels (and was possibly influenced by) the 1981 doxological version of the Statement of Faith of the United Church of Christ.

== Text ==
In life and in death we belong to God.
Through the grace of our Lord Jesus Christ,
the love of God,
and the communion of the Holy Spirit,
we trust in the one triune God, the Holy One of Israel,
whom alone we worship and serve.

We trust in Jesus Christ,
Fully human, fully God.
Jesus proclaimed the reign of God:
preaching good news to the poor
and release to the captives,
teaching by word and deed
and blessing the children,
healing the sick
and binding up the brokenhearted,
eating with outcasts,
forgiving sinners,
and calling all to repent and believe the gospel.
Unjustly condemned for blasphemy and sedition,
Jesus was crucified,
suffering the depths of human pain
and giving his life for the sins of the world.
God raised this Jesus from the dead,
vindicating his sinless life,
breaking the power of sin and evil,
delivering us from death to life eternal.

We trust in God,
whom Jesus called Abba, Father.
In sovereign love God created the world good
and makes everyone equally in God's image
male and female, of every race and people,
to live as one community.
But we rebel against God; we hide from our Creator.
Ignoring God's commandments,
we violate the image of God in others and ourselves,
accept lies as truth,
exploit neighbor and nature, and threaten death to the planet entrusted to our care.
We deserve God's condemnation.
Yet God acts with justice and mercy to redeem creation.
In everlasting love,
the God of Abraham and Sarah chose a covenant people
to bless all families of the earth.
Hearing their cry,
God delivered the children of Israel
from the house of bondage.
Loving us still,
God makes us heirs with Christ of the covenant.
Like a mother who will not forsake her nursing child,
like a father who runs to welcome the prodigal home,
God is faithful still.

We trust in God the Holy Spirit,
everywhere the giver and renewer of life.
The Spirit justifies us by grace through faith,
sets us free to accept ourselves and to love God and neighbor,
and binds us together with all believers
in the one body of Christ, the Church.
The same Spirit
who inspired the prophets and apostles
rules our faith and life in Christ through Scripture,
engages us through the Word proclaimed,
claims us in the waters of baptism,
feeds us with the bread of life and the cup of salvation,
and calls women and men to all ministries of the church.
In a broken and fearful world
the Spirit gives us courage
to pray without ceasing,
to witness among all peoples to Christ as Lord and Savior,
to unmask idolatries in Church and culture,
to hear the voices of peoples long silenced,
and to work with others for justice, freedom, and peace.
In gratitude to God, empowered by the Spirit,
we strive to serve Christ in our daily tasks
and to live holy and joyful lives,
even as we watch for God's new heaven and new earth,
praying, “Come, Lord Jesus!”

With believers in every time and place,
we rejoice that nothing in life or in death
can separate us from the love of God in Christ Jesus our Lord.

Glory be to the Father, and to the Son, and to the Holy Spirit. Amen.

== See also ==
- Jane Dempsey Douglass
