= Confession of 1967 =

Confession of faith of the Presbyterian Church (USA)

The Confession of 1967 is a confession of faith of the Presbyterian Church (U.S.A.), abbreviated PC (USA). It was written as a modern statement of the faith for the United Presbyterian Church in the United States of America (UPCUSA), the "northern church", to supplement the Westminster Confession and the other statements of faith in its then new Book of Confessions.

The document was influenced by Karl Barth, reflecting the view of Scripture espoused by the corresponding biblical theology movement prominent in mainline Protestant theological schools in the mid-twentieth century. During the consideration of its adoption by the presbyteries, conservatives who desired the continuance of strict subscription to only the Westminster Confession of Faith and the Catechisms campaigned against its inclusion.

== Historical context ==
The Confession of 1967 was written and debated in a denomination that found itself in an era shaped by the social movements of the 1950s and 1960s. The sexual revolution, woman's liberation, the civil rights movement, and the anti-war effort seemed to clash with the traditional values of the institutionalized church. Spirituality was in vogue, and the popularity of Eastern religious practices grew. A vocal minority of young Americans rejected organized religion along with the military, government and capitalism as part of "The Establishment". Some adults retained the religious values of their youth, but a vocal minority of the baby boomers rejected them. The counterculture was a powerful force in American culture and politics from the mid-1960s, when the oldest boomers became old enough to vote and actively influence America's society in multiple ways.

However, the church in America was not completely eclipsed. In fact, the document was mainly written in 1965 at a time of substantial growth for the predominantly mainline United Presbyterian Church in the U.S.A. Financial offerings to the denomination grew 61% from 1946 to 1967. Nevertheless, the social environment of the decade greatly impacted the Church and its members. As the leaders of the Church had done throughout its history, they sought reform and revision to remain current and relevant in a period of social changes. Thus the committee referred to the debates before the revolutions of 1848 and quoted a German theologian, Peter Schaff, who claimed in 1844 that the nature of Christian faith is not against but above reason. In the UPCUSA, such a desire to address modern social issues intersected with the theological implications of neo-orthodoxy, which was "well-established as the working theological consensus in the Presbyterian Church" by the late 1950s as "an alternative both to liberalism and fundamentalism."

The Special Committee on a Brief Contemporary Statement of Faith began preparing the Confession of 1967 in 1958 as a response to the Presbytery of Amarillo's 1957 overture to the General Assembly of the Presbyterian Church in the United States of America for an updated version of the Westminster Shorter Catechism in contemporary language. After considering the rewrite of the Catechism, the General Assembly instead decided to draft a new, contemporary statement of faith to be included in the constitution of the church after its 1958 union with the United Presbyterian Church of North America. The Special Committee's report was first presented to the UPCUSA's General Assembly in 1965. The committee was chaired by Edward Dowey Jr., professor at Princeton Theological Seminary and the single layman on the committee was the American philosopher Samuel Martin Thompson at Monmouth College (Illinois).

== Theology ==
Much of the confession's text is dedicated to the subject of reconciliation. It is written in three parts which the committee's chair designates as representing the faith, the love, and the hope of the Christian tradition.

=== God's "Work of Reconciliation" ===
Section I is an account of the Church's faith. It first establishes God's transcendence over humanity, then describes the fall of man into sin, depicts God's sacrifice, and then calls humanity to faith as a response to God's grace. It is told as a story of reconciliation, where God "alone reconciles the world to himself" by grace through the death of Jesus Christ on the cross. This Reconciliation is called one of the Bible's ultimate truths and an eternal promise that God has provided a way to heal the estranged relationship between man and himself after the fall. Section I's message is seen as central to Christian doctrine and is essentially a reaffirmation of faith. The confession asserts that the Church has been reconciled to God.

=== Ministry of reconciliation ===
Section II outlines how the Church should respond to God's grace and primarily deals with reconciliation between men. Dowey refers to this section as an expression of Christian love. The Confession states that to be reconciled to God is to be sent into the world as his reconciling community. The Church has been entrusted with God's message of reconciliation and it also shares his labor of healing the enmities which separate men from God and from each other. This part is written as a great call to action and is the committee's response to great human suffering. Throughout, they implore Presbyterian Christians, guided by the Holy Spirit, to act but cautions them to act with humility, for all men in their sin are compliant with evil. Furthermore, the confession points to four areas where it believes the Church has been specifically called to deal with crises in the modern era.

==== Racial discrimination ====
The confession affirms the racial equality of all men, brothers in Christ, and condemns those who dominate or patronize one another. It states that "God's reconciling love breaks down every form of discrimination based on racial or ethnic difference." Additionally, the confession claims it is the work of the Church to abolish such discrimination in society and care for those whom hatred has harmed.

==== International conflict ====
The confession states that "God's reconciliation in Jesus Christ is the ground of the peace, justice, and freedom among nations which all powers of government are called to serve and defend. The church, in its own life, is called to practice the forgiveness of enemies and to commend to the nations as practical politics the search for cooperation and peace." (9.45) This is seen as especially relevant in the age of nuclear, chemical, and biological weapons.

==== Enslaving poverty ====
The confession claims that in a world of plenty the suffering of those enslaved by poverty is "an intolerable violation of God's good creation." The Church is called to use its resources as Jesus commanded to ease the hardship of the impoverished.

==== Sexual anarchy ====
The confession asserts that the modern world has forgotten the true meaning of sexuality. By removing it from the sacred bounds of married life and childbearing, it has corrupted part of God's creation. It lists the availability of birth control and treatment of STD infection, pressures of urbanization, exploitation of sexual symbols in the media, and overpopulation as aggravating factors in "Man's perennial confusion about the meaning of sex". The church is warned that it "comes under the judgment of God and invites rejection by man when it fails to lead men and women into the full meaning of life together, or withholds the compassion of Christ from those caught in the moral confusion of our time."

=== Fulfillment of reconciliation ===
In Section III, the confession proclaims Christianity's hope. While it acknowledges the brokenness of the world, the confession reaffirms God's promise of the renewal and restoration of the Kingdom of Heaven on Earth. The church places its confidence in the work of God and not the strife of man; "in steadfast hope the Church looks beyond all partial achievement to the final triumph of God." It concludes with a quote from Paul's letter to the Ephesians: "Now to him who by the power at work within us is able to do far more abundantly than all we ask or think, to him be the glory in the church and in Christ Jesus to all generations, forever and ever. Amen."

=== Predestination and determinism ===
Conservatives were similarly concerned the confession opposed a number of the traditional elements of Calvinism, including the concept of Predestination. Calvinist theology has historically provided the foundation for Presbyterian confessions. Multiple factions within the denominations rejected the committee's attempt to distance the denomination from Calvin.

Many opponents maintain that the authors of the document deny that Christ died only for the sins of the elect rather than for all people, contrary to the original Westminster Confession. In its place, conservatives believe that the 1967 modification supports universalism. Additionally, they take issue with the more humanistic theology, focusing more on man's ability to "save himself", trivializing the centrality of God in the salvation of both individuals and society as a whole. There are those who believe that some of the phraseology suggests that man has the capacity for self-transcendence. In the Protestant community the debate between God's sovereignty, scripture and freedom is long standing, with different communities weighting the role of man and God in salvation differently. However, conservatives claim that the confession all together leaves out God's spirit in the reconciliation of man to man.

There was also backlash relating to the Church's interference into the political sphere. The Presbyterian Lay Committee voiced their concerns about the inappropriateness of a spiritual body turning away from its purported historical call to enter into secular affairs. United States Defense Secretary Robert McNamara, a Presbyterian elder, expressed his concern about the "disarmament mentality" suggested by the confession. The committee was also concerned about the theological changes proposed in the document, taking special issue with the claim, "the scriptures are nevertheless the words of men". They campaigned heavily against the passage of the confession, and took out full-page ads in The New York Times, The Washington Post, and The Wall Street Journal expressing their protest. The movement also created a newsletter called The Layman, which remains in circulation today. It claims credit for "sharp reductions of unrestricted church gifts for projects controlled by the General Assembly Mission Council" of the PCUSA.

The confession ultimately had broad support, being approved by presbyteries by a nearly 90 percent margin.
