= Philosophy of dialogue =

Concept in the philosophy of Martin Buber

Philosophy of dialogue is a type of philosophy based on the work of the Austrian-born Jewish philosopher Martin Buber, best known through its classic presentation in his 1923 book I and Thou.

For Buber, the fundamental fact of human existence, too readily overlooked by scientific rationalism and abstract philosophical thought, is "man with man", a dialogue which takes place in the "sphere of between" (German: das Zwischenmenschliche).

== See also ==
- Dialogical analysis
- Dialogical logic
- Dialogical self
- Dialogical Ecology
- Interfaith dialogue
- Intersubjectivity
- I and Thou
