= Paul Nimmo =

Scottish theologian

Professor Paul T. Nimmo
- Born: Edinburgh, Scotland
- Occupations: Professor, Theologian
- Title: King's Chair of Systematic Theology

Academic background
- Education: MA, DipIA, BD, ThM, PhD
- Alma mater: University of Cambridge; University of Edinburgh; Princeton Theological Seminary

Academic work
- Discipline: Systematic Theology
- Institutions: University of Cambridge; University of Edinburgh; University of Aberdeen
- Main interests: systematic theology, historical theology, and theological ethics

Paul T. Nimmo is a Scottish theologian who holds the position of King’s Chair of Systematic Theology at the University of Aberdeen.

== Career ==
Nimmo studied engineering and management studies at Corpus Christi College at the University of Cambridge before qualifying as an investment manager. His studies in divinity were undertaken at the University of Edinburgh, Princeton Theological Seminary, and the University of Tübingen. His first position was as an associate lecturer at the University of Cambridge as the research assistant to the Regius Professor of Divinity, David Ford. He was appointed in 2008 as Meldrum Lecturer in Reformed Theology at the University of Edinburgh, and was later promoted to Meldrum Senior Lecturer. In 2013 Nimmo was invited to a personal chair in systematic theology at the University of Aberdeen. He was translated to the 1620 King’s Chair of Systematic Theology in 2016, and served as Head of Divinity at Aberdeen from 2016 to 2018 and again from 2022 to 2023. He is co-director – together with Tom Greggs and Phil Ziegler – of the Aberdeen Centre for Protestant Theology, founded in October 2017 on the 500th anniversary of the Protestant Reformation.

== Professional activities ==
Since 2016, Nimmo has been senior editor of the International Journal of Systematic Theology, for which publication he served as Managing Editor between 2007 and 2014 and as Editor from 2013 to 2016. He is also Series co-Editor of the T&T Clark series Explorations in Reformed Theology, and serves on the Editorial Boards of the IVP series Christian Doctrine and Scripture, the Lexington Press series Studies in Dialectical Theology, and the Cascade Books series Re-envisioning Reformed Dogmatics.

He has been a Member of the Translation Seminar at the Center for Barth Studies at Princeton Seminary since 2007, and became the English-language editor of the published works of the Seminar in 2022. He served on the steering committee of the Reformed Theology and History Unit at the American Academy of Religion for nine years, including as co-Chair from 2017 to 2020, and on the steering committee of the Friedrich Schleiermacher Unit between 2016 and 2019. He served as treasurer of the Society for the Study of Theology from 2013 to 2016, having been a member of its executive committee between 2009 and 2012.

== Publications ==
Nimmo was awarded a John Templeton Award for Theological Promise in 2009, for his book Being in Action: The Theological Shape of Barth's Ethical Vision (2007), which was based on his doctoral thesis at Edinburgh. He is also the author of Karl Barth: A Guide for the Perplexed (2016), co-Editor with David Fergusson of the University of Edinburgh of the Cambridge Companion to Reformed Theology (2016), co-Editor with Paul Dafydd Jones of the University of Virginia of the Oxford Handbook of Karl Barth (2017), and co-Editor with Keith L. Johnson of Kenosis: The Self-Emptying of Christ in Scripture and Theology (2022). He is currently completing a monograph entitled Karl Barth and the Lord’s Supper: Thinking With and After Barth on the Lord’s Supper (2024), and preparing further work on heaven and on the doctrine of sanctification.

== Ecclesiastical activities ==
In 2020, Nimmo became a Member of the Communion of Protestant Churches in Europe delegation for a second phase of ecumenical dialogue with the Dicastery for Promoting Christian Unity on the doctrine of the church. In the same year, he also became a Member of the Theological Forum of the Church of Scotland, and now serves as its Vice-Convener. From 2014 to 2018, Nimmo was the Adviser of the Learn initiative of the Church of Scotland. From 2008 to 2015, he was a Member of the Joint Commission on Doctrine of the Church of Scotland and the Roman Catholic Church in Scotland. From 2011 to 2013 he was a Member of the Action of Churches Together in Scotland/Church of Scotland ‘Why Believe?’ Group, and from 2009 to 2012 he participated in the Church of Scotland Working Group on Issues in Human Sexuality. He is an ordained elder in the Church of Scotland and preaches regularly in local parishes in Aberdeen and Aberdeenshire.

== Research and teaching ==
Nimmo’s research interests lie primarily in the field of systematic theology, exploring the meaning, coherence, and implications of Christian doctrine. His specific area of focus is the history and theology of the Reformed tradition, with a particular interest in the theology of Friedrich Schleiermacher, the theology of Karl Barth, and the Reformed tradition in Scotland. In 2008, he was a guest lecturer in Reformed theology at the University of Göttingen, and in the same year, he delivered the Kerr Lectures at the University of Glasgow on "A Theology of Obedience". His teaching portfolio covers an array of themes in the areas of Christian theology, Christian ethics, and church history. In 2011, the quality of his teaching was recognised by a University-wide Teaching Award from the Edinburgh University Students’ Association. He teaches on courses at the Aberdeen Academy of Theology, and at events of the Centre for Ministry Studies in Aberdeen, of which he is an associate.
