= Ronald Gregor Smith =

Scottish theologian (1913–1968)

- Born: Ronald Smith; 17 April 1913; Edinburgh, Scotland
- Died: 26 September 1968 (aged 55); Hull, England
- Education: George Heriot's School, Edinburgh University
- Occupations: Translator, publisher, theologian, academic
- Notable work: I and Thou (translated from Martin Buber) (1937); Secular Christianity (1966)
- Spouse: Käthe Wittlake
- Theological work
- Tradition or movement: Secular theology

Ronald Gregor Smith (17 April 1913–26 September 1968) was a Scottish theologian, translator and academic who contributed to the development of modern theology in the aftermath of World War II. He translated the writings of a number of German theologians into English, and wrote three theological books of his own, one posthumously, where he tacked his own arguments to the debate on secular theology. He died at the age of 55, before his anticipated delivery of the 1969 Warfield Lectures.

== Early years ==
Gregor Smith was born in Edinburgh on 17 April 1913, the son of Harry Smith, a marine biologist, and Helen Wilson, née Dea. He attended George Heriot's School and then went to Edinburgh University to study for a Master of Arts degree in English literature between 1930 and 1934. Afterwards he spent a year in Munich to study philosophy and literature, where he met his future wife, Katherina (Käthe) Wittlake. Gregor Smith returned to Edinburgh in 1935 to take a divinity degree at New College, Edinburgh, a route for his ordination as a minister into the Church of Scotland. After graduation in 1938 he went to Copenhagen to study Søren Kierkegaard for a potential doctorate, then to the Marburg University in Germany to study Rudolf Bultmann.

== Work as a translator ==
Gregor Smith translated, or edited translations, of twenty two books from German and Danish into English. His first translation in 1937, at the suggestion of John Baillie and while still an undergraduate student, was of the Jewish philosopher Martin Buber's book I and Thou. This was an important publishing event, and facilitated other theological investigation which may not have happened without the translation being made available at that point in time. Further translations of the work of Buber, Karl Barth, Gerhard Ebeling and similar theologians were to follow.

== Post-war service in Germany ==
The outbreak of World War II brought an end to Gregor Smith's stay in Germany, and he returned to Scotland to become the Church of Scotland minister in Selkirk, Scottish Borders. In 1944 he joined the Scots Guards as a chaplain. After the war was over he stayed in Germany as part of the Allied Control Commission, and in 1946 he became an education officer at University of Bonn. This allowed him to re-establish his relationship with Wittlake, and in 1947 they were married by Karl Barth who was at that time based in Bonn.

== Return to Britain ==
In 1947 Gregor Smith accepted the position as an editor for the Student Christian Movement Press in London, and he became managing director from 1950 to 1956. He used his background to turn the Press into a major publishing house for theological work. It also gave him scope to work on his own writings and the SCM Press published his first theology book. In 1956 he accepted the position of primarius professor of divinity at Glasgow University. This appointment attracted controversy since the Kirk was of the view that this appointment was subject to their ratification. Gregor Smith went to court to ensure that this was seen as an entirely secular appointment. He remained the faculty's chair until his death in 1968.

== Theological writings ==
Gregor Smith wrote three substantive books on theology, one of which was published after his death.

==== The New Man: Christianity and Man's Coming of Age ====
Gregor Smith's first theological book, based on an Australian lecture series, was published in 1956, after he had worked extensively on translating modern German theologians into English in the preceding two decades. It was a short book, 120 pages, where he challenged the other worldliness of traditional Christianity, and emphasised humans' own faith taking responsibility for society's actions. The text was influenced by the ideas of Bultmann as well as Dietrich Bonhoeffer and Paul Tillich.

==== Secular Christianity ====
Secular Christianity was published in 1966 and had a worldwide impact, not least in influencing Lloyd Geering's trial for heresy in New Zealand in 1967.. This was less tentative than Gregor Smith's first book, and he suggested that modern secularism needed to be more secular. He speculated that Jesus Christ's bones were still buried somewhere in Palestine, and that aspect did not matter in terms of the overriding presence of faith. Traditional Christian teaching puts much emphasis on the bodily resurrection of Jesus Christ after his crucifixion, and this book was quite a challenge to Christian orthodoxy.

==== The Doctrine of God ====
Gregor Smith's final work was published in 1970, with assistance from his widow, two years after his premature death. It had been planned that Gregor Smith would present the 1969 Warfield Lectures at the Princeton Theological Seminary, but his 1968 death meant it could not happen. However Gregor Smith had already prepared some of the material for the Lecture and this material was edited into his final work. He wrote that "God is seen through human eyes: only our human experience is available", indicating that by focusing on this experience it should show that humans have the unfulfilled potential - that there is more than can be done by an individual to obtain the personal realisation of God. In this endeavour, doctrine is secondary to faith, which is always present and the fundamental raw material for all theological discussion.

== Other works ==
Gregor Smith's two earliest autobiographical memoirs were written under pseudonyms. Still Point was published in 1943 under the name of Ronald Maxwell; and Back from the Front in 1946 under the name of Sam Browne. In 1960 Gregor Smith published J. G. Hamann, 1730 - 1788, a Study in Christian Existence, a review of the Lutheran philosopher Johann Georg Hamann. In 1969 The Free Man was published (the American title was The Whole Man), which was partly based on the 1956 The New Man, but with additional lecture material added. Gregor Smith wrote a substantial number of articles, reviews, poetry and sermons. In 1947 and 1948 he attempted to launch the Scottish Periodical, as a viable philosophical and literary journal, but it did not get further than two editions. It may have been an idiosyncratic undertaking but given Gregor Smith background in both English literature and theology it provides a particular insight into Gregor Smith's mindset.

== Death ==
Gregor Smith died unexpectedly from a heart attack at the age of 55, on 26 September 1968, in the port city of Hull after returning from a visit to Germany with his wife. He was 55 years old. He was buried in Balmaha, by Loch Lomond, close to where he and his wife had a croft.

== Legacy and impact ==
Gregor Smith was described as "one of the most creative and most neglected theologians of the post-war years in Britain." He was a key contributor to the development of theological debate in Scotland and Europe, and the relationship between secular trends, cultural change and Europe's postwar identity. He was of the view that Christianity was at its greatest relevance when it related to everyday realities, rather than in abstract terms.. He had a reputation as a maverick and radical theologian, but he respected the traditions of Scottish Presbyterianism, appreciating that many of his students were destined for ordination into the Kirk, a path that he had followed earlier in life. Gregor Smith's emphasis on community faith have a particular value in being a potential practical mechanism for reflection and constructive criticism within a congregation. By providing translations, through his work with SCM Press and as a professor of a respected faculty, Gregor Smith opened up theological investigation for other scholars, particularly in Britain, of the more radical theologies under development elsewhere in Europe.
