= Book of Confessions =

US Presbyterian Church book of creeds and confessions

The Book of Confessions contains the creeds and confessions of the Presbyterian Church (U.S.A.). The contents are the Nicene Creed, the Apostles' Creed, the Scots Confession, the Heidelberg Catechism, the Second Helvetic Confession, the Westminster Confession of Faith, the Shorter Catechism, the Larger Catechism, the Theological Declaration of Barmen, the Confession of 1967, the Confession of Belhar, and the Brief Statement of Faith.

The book was first published in 1983, and has since been revised. When it was first published, the intent was to blend the theological traditions of the Presbyterian Church in the United States and the United Presbyterian Church in the United States of America. The role of the Book of Confessions is to provide historical context for Biblical interpretations.

== Amendment process ==
Amending the Book of Confessions is a six-year-long process. The process begins when a General Assembly appoints a committee to study a proposed amendment. The committee presents its report at the following General Assembly, which then votes on whether to send the amendment to the presbyteries. Two-thirds of the presbyteries, and another General Assembly must approve the amendment in order for it to be included. In 2008, the 218th General Assembly began the process of adopting a new translation of the Heidelberg Catechism, as well as the Belhar Confession. In 2012, the new translation of the Heidelberg Catechism was sent to the presbyteries for approval, and, after being rejected by the presbyteries, the 220th General Assembly voted to restart the process to include the Belhar Confession.
