= Fourth Presbyterian Church (Chicago) =

Historic church in Illinois, United States

Coordinates: 41°53′55.5″N 87°37′29″W

- Fourth Presbyterian Church of Chicago
- U.S. National Register of Historic Places
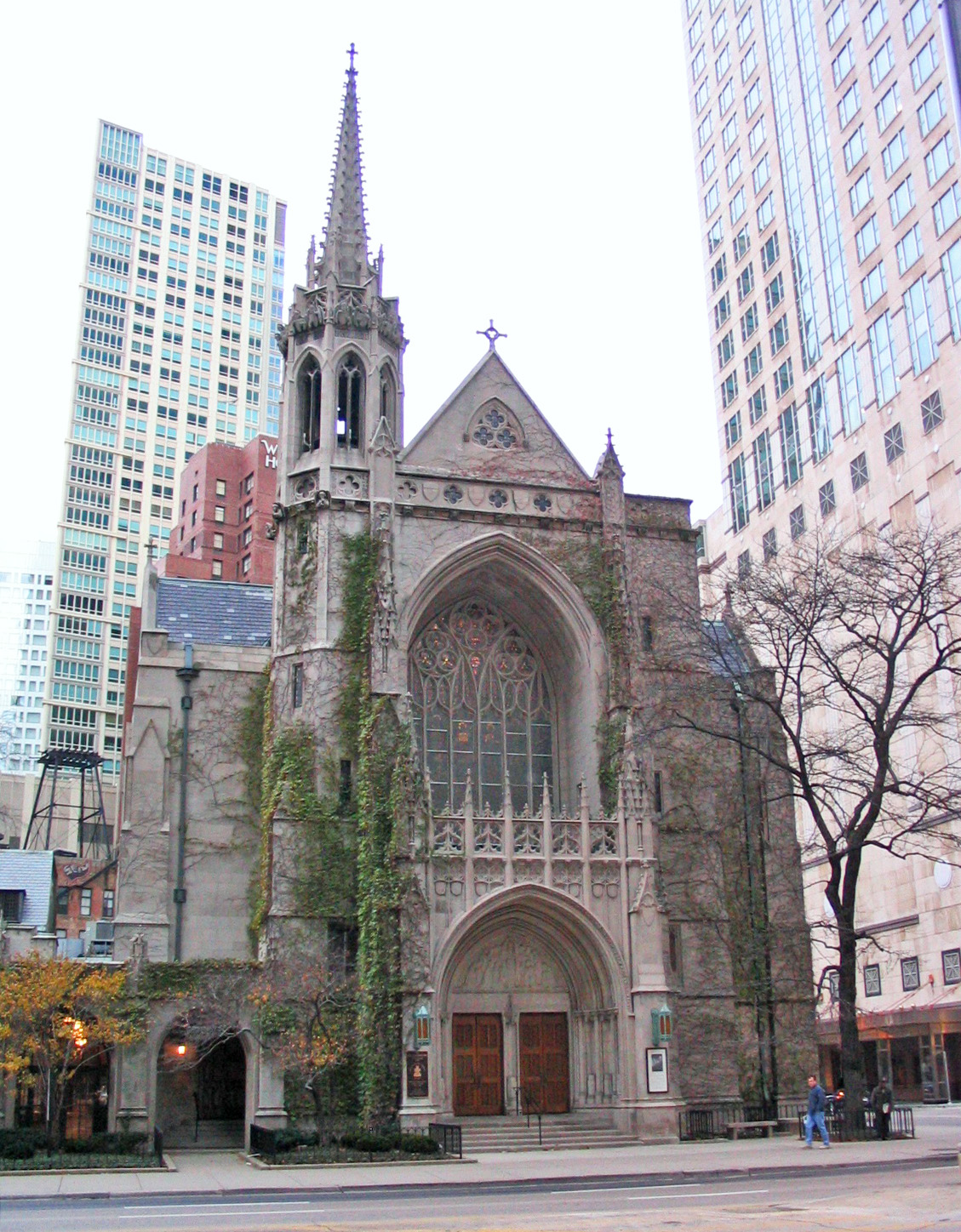
- Fourth Presbyterian Church front facade facing Michigan Avenue, Chicago

- Location within Chicago metropolitan area Location within Illinois Location within the United States
- Location: 126 East Chestnut Street; Chicago, Illinois
- Built: 1912
- Architect: Ralph Adams Cram, Howard Van Doren Shaw
- Architectural style: Gothic Revival
- NRHP reference No.: 75000648
- Added to NRHP: September 5, 1975

The Fourth Presbyterian Church of Chicago is one of the largest congregations of the Presbyterian Church (U.S.A.), the largest in the Presbytery of Chicago, located in the Magnificent Mile neighborhood of Chicago, directly across Michigan Avenue from the John Hancock Center.

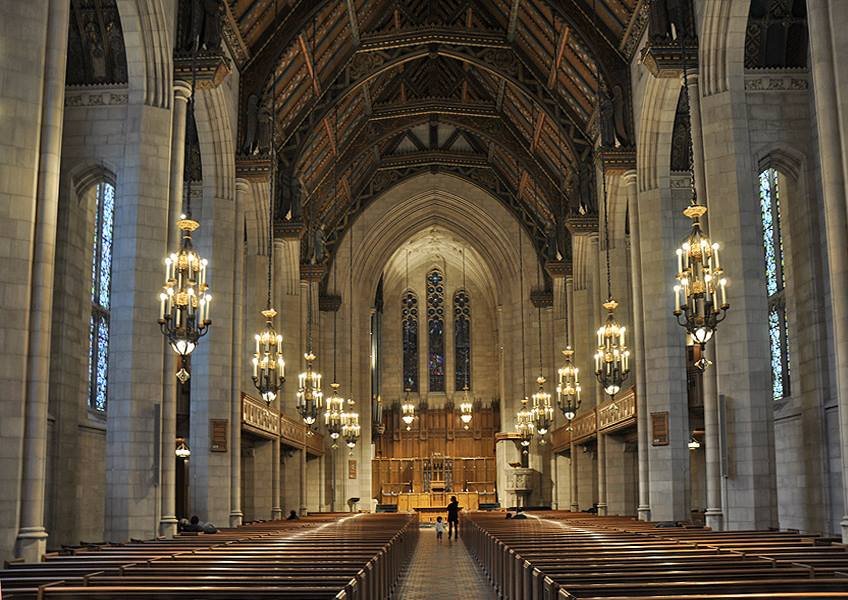
Interior

== History ==
The Fourth Presbyterian Church of Chicago was formed on February 12, 1871, by the merger of Westminster Presbyterian Church and North Presbyterian Church. The combined congregation dedicated a new church building on Sunday, October 8, 1871. The Great Chicago Fire began later that day and destroyed the young congregation's new sanctuary.

The congregation subsequently built a second building, located at the corner of Rush Street and Superior Street, which it dedicated February 1874.

After nearly 40 years at that location, in 1912, the congregation built a new building on Pine Street (now North Michigan Avenue), which was then a fairly undeveloped part of the city. The congregation employed architect Ralph Adams Cram to create a Gothic Revival building of dressed limestone. Cram, who also designed the Cathedral of St. John the Divine in New York City, worked on both churches simultaneously during 1912. Only Fourth Presbyterian was completed, however, and was dedicated in 1914. In contrast, St. John the Divine is still officially unfinished and is considered a work in progress.

Cram designed and built the sanctuary and Stone Chapel, however the parish house, cloister, manse, and garth, which lie to the south along Michigan Avenue, were designed by Howard Van Doren Shaw. The church building is the oldest structure on North Michigan Avenue, with the exception of the Chicago Water Tower, and is listed on the National Register of Historic Places. The sanctuary has notable stained-glass windows by Charles Jay Connick.

In 1884, the congregation worked with Rush Medical College to establish the city's Presbyterian Hospital

In 2012, the church constructed a major addition of the Gratz Center administrative building, in part financed by then-member Kenneth C. Griffin. Within is the contemporary Buchanan Chapel, named for Rev.John Buchanan, and contains a labyrinth floor inspired by Chartres Cathedral and a sculpture by Chicago artist Richard Hunt.

== Statistics ==
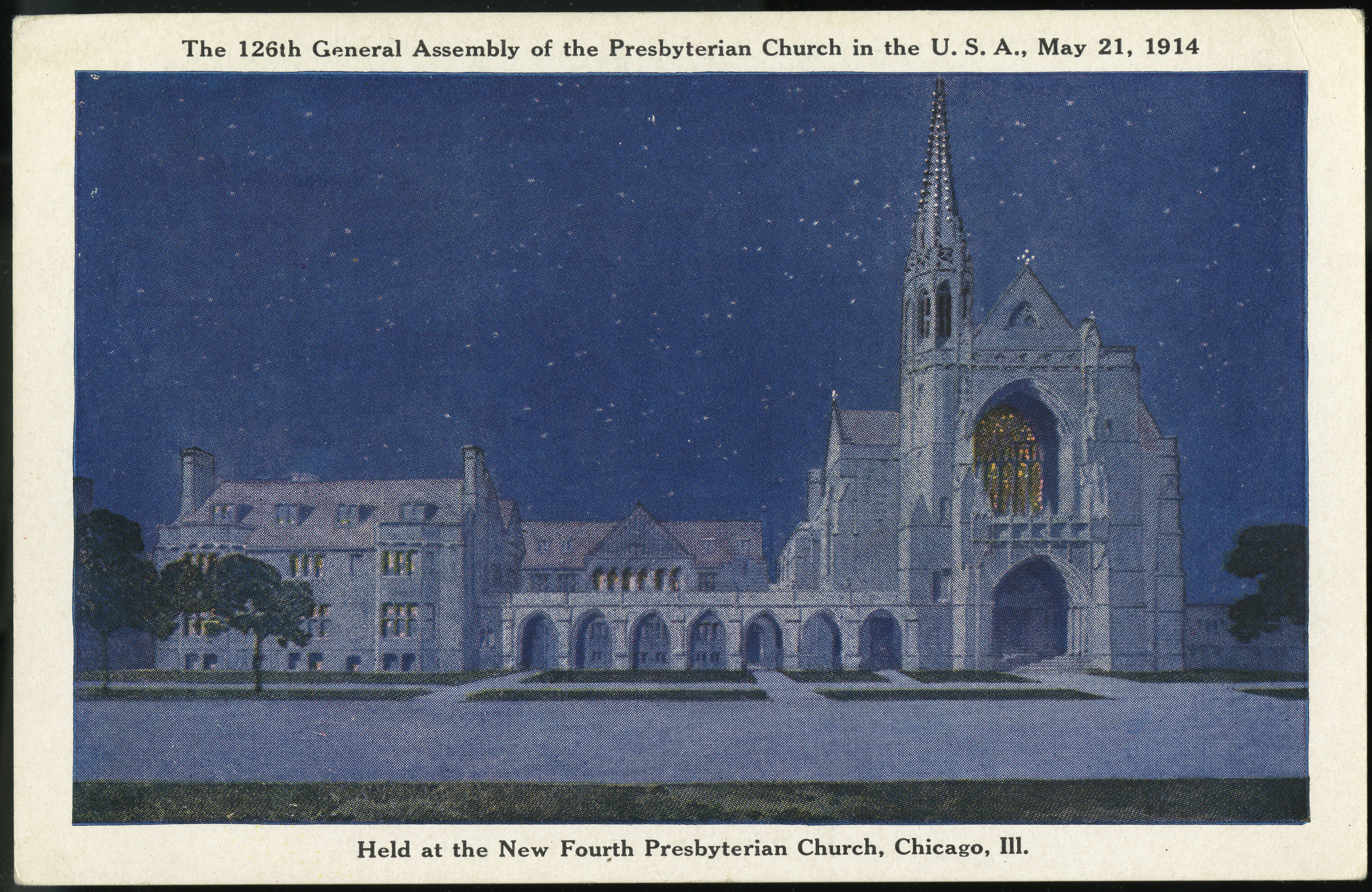
The church in 1914

According to the PC (USA), in 2013 Fourth Church had 5,540 members, the second-largest Presbyterian congregation in the United States. 2024 membership is reportedly 3,155.

In 2015 at Fourth Church, Quimby Pipe Organs installed a three-million-dollar instrument with five manuals, 143 ranks, and 8,343 pipes, the largest in the midwestern United States.

== Pastors ==
Shortly before the turn of the 19th century, Rev. M. Woolsey Stryker (1885–1892), a widely quoted pundit as well as prolific hymnwriter, served as pastor but left Chicago to become President of his alma mater, Hamilton College, in upstate New York. Reverend John Buchanan, who held the post of senior pastor for 25 years, retired as of January 31, 2012. In March 2014, Fourth Presbyterian's members voted at a congregational meeting for the Reverend Shannon Johnson Kershner to lead the church as its next pastor commencing on May 1, 2014. She left the congregation in 2022. Reverend Doctor Camille Cook Howe was appointed as the new pastor in 2025.

== Other Presbyterian churches in Chicago ==
- First Presbyterian Church
- Second Presbyterian Church
- Edgewater Presbyterian Church
