= Edgewater Presbyterian Church =

Coordinates: 41.9839°N 87.6563°W

- New Community House
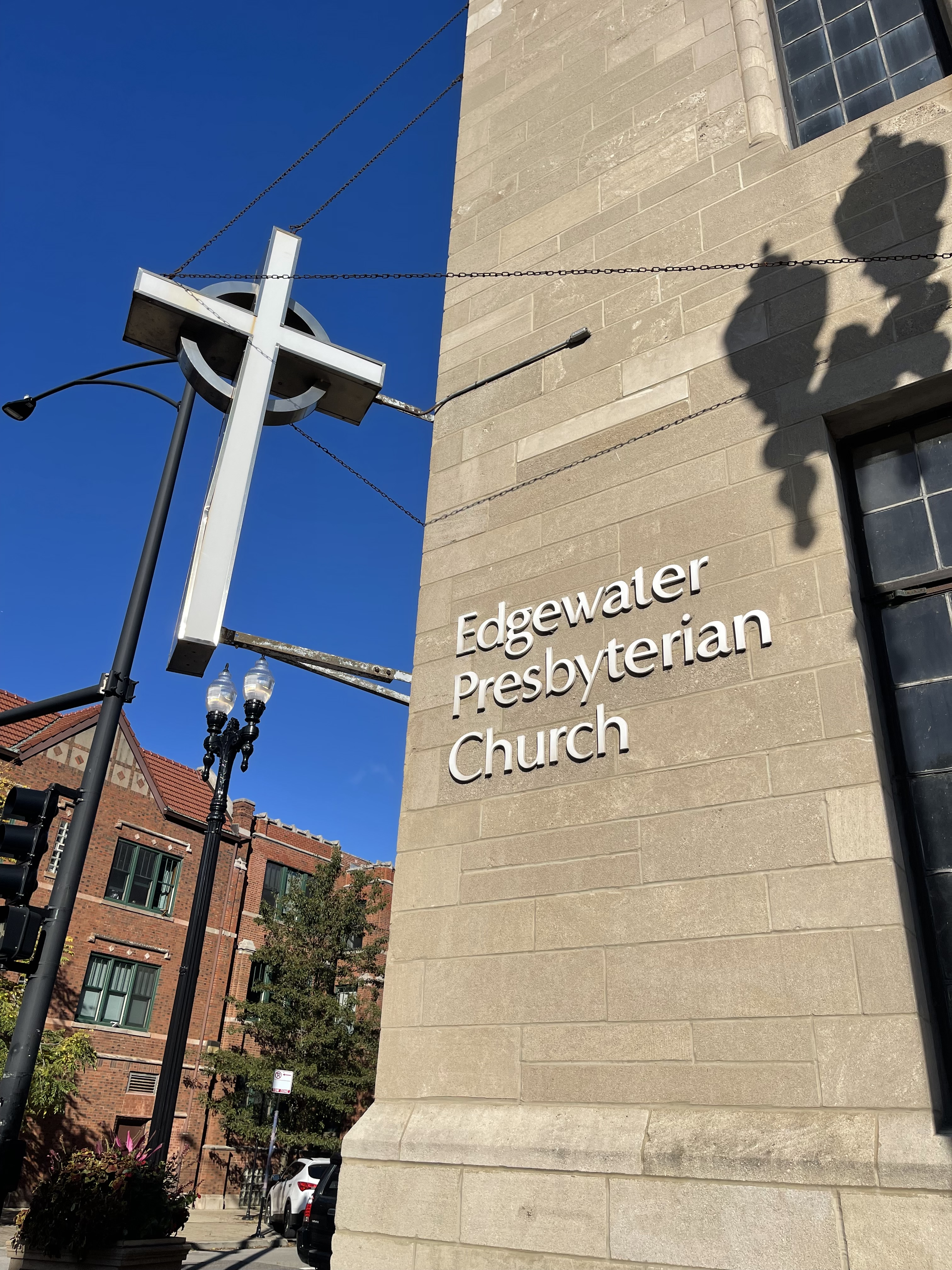
- Illuminated cross on the corner of Bryn Mawr Ave. at Kenmore Ave. in Chicago, Illinois
- Edgewater Presbyterian Church
- Address: 1020 W. Bryn Mawr Ave., Chicago, Illinois 60660
- Country: United States
- Denomination: Presbyterian Church (USA)
- Previous denomination: United Presbyterian Church in the United States of America, Presbyterian Church in the United States of America
- Tradition: Presbyterianism, Church of Scotland
- Website: edgewaterpcusa.org

History
- Status: Church, community house, performing arts
- Founded: June 9, 1896

Architecture
- Architect: Dwight H. Perkins of Perkins, Fellows, and Hamilton
- Architectural type: Church, community house, performing arts
- Style: French Romanesque
- Years built: 1926-1927
- Groundbreaking: 1926
- Completed: 1927

Specifications
- Materials: Indiana limestone, concrete, iron

Administration
- Parish: Edgewater

Clergy
- Pastor(s): Rev. Kristin Hutson, M.Div., J.D.

Edgewater Presbyterian Church, sometimes referred to as the Edgewater Kirk and the New Community House, is a mainline Protestant church rooted in Reformed theology and the Scottish Reformation. Since 1983, it has been a member of the Presbyterian Church (USA), the largest Presbyterian denomination in the U.S. Previous to that, it was a member of the United Presbyterian Church in the United States of America.

Located in the Edgewater neighborhood community area of Chicago, Illinois, the church is one of several historic buildings in the Bryn Mawr Historic District as declared by the City of Chicago on November 6, 2002.

The building is designed in the French Romanesque architectural style with concrete clad in Indiana Limestone.

The congregation was founded by 43 charter members with Church of Scotland roots on June 9, 1896. Many of the first congregants were of Scottish and Welsh ancestry or immigrants from Great Britain.

The congregation is a member of the Presbytery of Chicago which is represented in and by the Synod of Lincoln Trails, one of 16 regional governing bodies of the Presbyterian Church (USA). Edgewater Presbyterian Church is represented in the highest governing body of the denomination, the General Assembly, by elected commissioners from the presbytery. The General Assembly meets every two years.

Two other faith communities worship in, but are independent of, Edgewater Presbyterian Church. They are Northside Friends Meeting, a Quaker congregation, and Grace Baptist Church, a congregation of the American Baptist Churches.

The current pastor of Edgewater Presbyterian Church is the Rev. Kristin E. Hutson, M.Div., J.D. She concurrently serves with Presbyterian Disaster Assistance (PDA) National Response Team. She was previously Chaplain and Director of Religious Life at Coe College, a Presbyterian Church (USA) institution in Cedar Rapids, Iowa.

== Theology ==
=== Bible ===
As a member of the Presbyterian Church (USA), Edgewater Presbyterian Church believes in the Bible as the written word of God.

Like the Lectionary of the denomination, Edgewater Presbyterian Church preachers usually use the New Revised Standard Version and New Revised Standard Version Updated Edition of the Bible. Also used are the Common English Bible and The Message, contemporary English translations that have connections with the Presbyterian Church (USA).

=== Confessions ===
The Constitution of the faith is found in the Book of Order and Book of Confessions. Among the Confessions are the Nicene Creed, Apostle's Creed, Scots Confession, Heidelberg Catechism, Second Helvetic Confession, Westminster Confession of Faith, Shorter Catechism, Larger Catechism, Theological Declaration of Barmen, Confession of 1967, Confession of Belhar, and Brief Statement of Faith.

=== Sacraments ===
There are only two Sacraments of the faith: baptism and the Lord's Supper or Eucharist

According to the Directory for Worship, "Sacraments are signs of the real presence and power of Christ in the Church, symbols of God's action. Through the Sacraments, God seals believers in redemption, renews their identity as the people of God, and marks them for service."

Administration of the Sacraments must always be authorized by Session.

=== Social theologies ===
Edgewater Presbyterian Church has ascribed to the validity of women in pastoral roles having offered the last three calls to women. It practices the Presbyterian Church (USA) commitment "to the equality of women in its councils, places of worship, and ministry areas."

Edgewater Presbyterian Church shares in the Presbytery of Chicago's commitment to "deepen our understanding that diversity is not about optics or even simply about representation and that homogeneity is unnatural, unhealthy and opposed to the gospel. Truly diverse communities are generative, creative, and reflective of God's intent for creation." It is also committed to "attend to the intersections of oppressions where we and our communities are entangled. The ways that racism, patriarchy, misogyny, ableism, classism, and homophobia work in concert to create and sustain systems of dominance."

Edgewater Presbyterian Church shares in the denomination's commitment to "[celebrate] the gifts of all gender identities and sexual orientations in the life of the Church and [affirm] the full dignity and humanity of all people."

== Liturgy ==
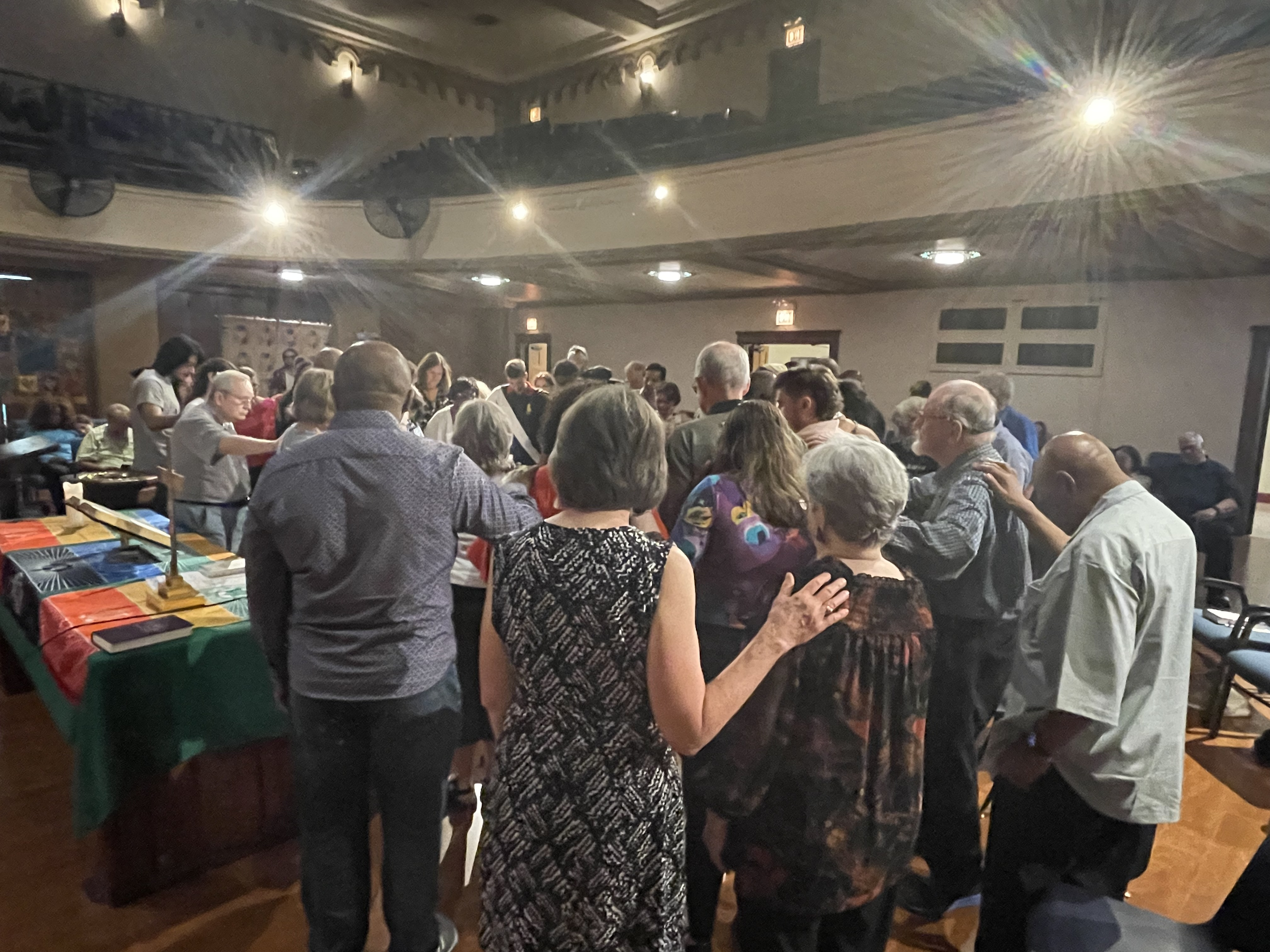
Edgewater Presbyterian Church members gather together to pray. Visible are the balcony theater seats when the Sanctuary was originally intended for the performing arts.

Edgewater Presbyterian Church uses the Book of Common Worship 2018 edition, among other liturgical resources, to guide its liturgical practices. It also uses Glory to God: The Presbyterian Hymnal as its primary source for hymns. It is the official hymnal of the Presbyterian Church (USA).

Edgewater Presbyterian Church follows traditional Presbyterian order of worship, as found in the Book of Common Worship, with changes as needed by consensus of the preacher and Session:

- Gathering. Call to Worship, Hymns of Praise, Confession and Pardon, and Passing of the Peace.
- The Word. Prayer for Illumination, Scripture Readings, the Sermon, an Invitation to Discipleship, the Affirmation of Faith, Baptism (as authorized by Session), and Prayers of the People.
- The Eucharist (as authorized by Session). Offering, Invitation to the Table, Great Thanksgiving, Lord's Prayer, Communion of the People.
- Sending. Songs or Acts of Commitment, the Charge, and Blessing.

The four-fold order of worship, as was practiced by John Calvin and John Knox, does not deviate much from the Roman Catholic order of worship.

With a substantial Nigerian and Cameroonian membership and participation, African-inspired elements have been part of various liturgies. The congregation celebrates an annual Harvest Liturgy each year before the Thanksgiving holiday, taking from African traditions.

== Architecture ==
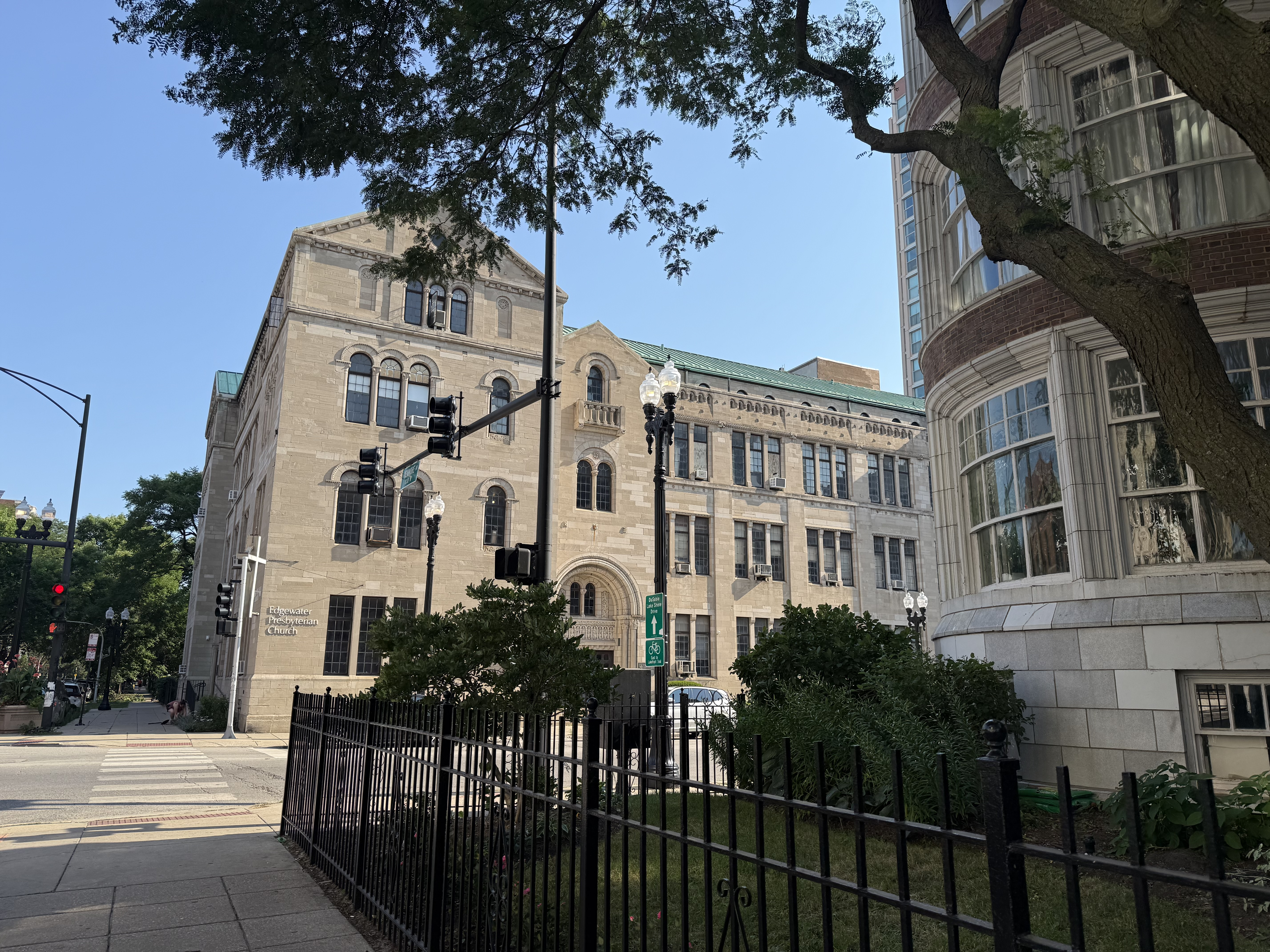
Edgewater Presbyterian Church as seen from the Manor House on Kenmore Ave.

Edgewater Presbyterian Church was designed by the architectural firm Perkins, Hamilton & Fellows which had an office in downtown Chicago.

The building features fireproof concrete, which was state-of-the-art at the time, clad in Indiana Limestone.

Architectural ornamentation above the church's front and side doors were designed by sculptor Emil Zettler. He was a regular contractor for the architect. Zettler designed the sculpted reliefs for their 815 E. Tower Court office and studio and the Gymnastic Wing of Evanston Township High School in suburban Evanston, Illinois. He was also instrumental in the relief designs for Temple Sholom.

Two rooms of note are the Log Cabin Room, designed for one of the earliest Boy Scouts Troops in Chicago. The other is the Cross Memorial Chapel, which was used for liturgies while waiting for the construction of a larger Sanctuary.

== Memorials ==
Two large bronze memorial plaques were erected to commemorate members lost during World War I and World War II. They are located outside the Sanctuary on the ground floor.

== Historical records ==
Official documents and other artifacts of Edgewater Presbyterian Church are stored at the Presbyterian Historical Society in Philadelphia, Pennsylvania. This includes records of baptism, confirmation, weddings, funerals, and ordinations. They can be viewed in-person by request.

== Early history ==
=== Early churches and community houses ===
Previous to its current location, the congregation met in several smaller church properties. Its first church was on leased property at Granville Ave. at Greenwood Ave., across from the present-day Stephen K. Hayt Elementary School. With over 700 members, it outgrew the space. It then built a new church at 5550 N. Kenmore Ave., with the help of philanthropist Nancy Fowler McCormick. Further growth meant the need for a larger space culminating in the purchase of two lots across the street at 1020 W. Bryn Mawr Ave.

==== Granville Avenue Presbyterian Church ====
Edgewater Presbyterian Church evangelized the larger area under the leadership of its second pastor, the Rev. Dr. Louis Perkins Cain, D.D. One of the goals of the mission was temperance.

A 1945 bulletin of that mission's successor church recorded, according to Edgewater Historical Society:

"It was back in 1903, when Dr. Louis P. Cain and some of his Edgewater Presbyterian Young People purchased a small folding organ with which they put on street evangelistic services and tried to counteract the influence of the increasing liquor traffic. Granville was just a cabbage patch in those days. Northwestern University, a strictly Methodist School then controlled and dominated all property for four miles around down to Devon Avenue, and by the force of its charter kept all that land ‘dry.’ The south side of the street was John Barley Corn's front line, which Dr. Cain and his troopers decided to attact with a war of nerves. So on Sunday afternoons they would hold street meetings to evangelize the neighborhood, starting at Rosehill Cemetery working north on Clark Street until by 1904 they had sufficient followers to rent a store building near the southeast corner of Devon and Clark for a Sunday School."

Outgrowing its storefront, the mission was installed in an old Edgewater Presbyterian Church building. It was a simple A-frame structure that was physically moved for them to Granville Ave.

The bulletin continued:

"For the next five years [after the dedication of the building] students from the seminary were employed in what was known then as the Presbyterian mission of North Edgewater. Finally the church gained strength and on Thursday evening, March 31, 1910 it was organized into the Granville Avenue Presbyterian Church. Dr. Louis B.[sic] Cain spoke on that occasion."

Granville Avenue Presbyterian Church was dissolved by the Presbytery of Chicago.

==== St. James United Church ====
Through Granville Avenue Presbyterian Church, Edgewater Presbyterian Church is also the motherchurch of North Town Presbyterian Church. After moving around to several locations, it finally settled at 6554 N. Rockwell Ave. as St. James United Church. It, too, is a now-defunct congregation.

== New Community House ==
When the existing Edgewater Presbyterian Church outgrew its church and community house at 5550 N. Kenmore Ave., they purchased a lot across the street with the intention of building a new church and adjacent New Community House.

The New Community House was completed in 1927 with four-stories and 52,000 square feet of space. It housed a theater auditorium, gymnasium with bleachers, and the top floor served as the manse where pastor and service staff would live.

The 1929 stock market crash threatened the New Community House with foreclosure. Members of the congregation mortgaged their own homes to save the building. They also scrapped plans for the construction of a new church with steeple next door.

Without the separate church, the congregation pivoted and transformed the theater space into a permanent Sanctuary for liturgies. The raised stage was reconstructed as a chancel with pulpit at the center. Risers were built behind the pastoral chairs for the choir and massive pipe organ manual. The velvet-lined, folding theater seating remained.

=== Space-sharers ===
Since then, the building has housed several theater companies, schools, a Head Start program, and various social service organizations. Artists, musicians, and writers have also made residencies in the New Community House.

A 99-seat black box theater space on the second floor is home to City Lit Theater, a theater company that specializes in stage productions of literary works, since 1979. Its founding received the attention of Tennessee Williams who sent his personal congratulations.

=== Immigrants and refugees ===
Three organizations serving immigrants and their families from Nepal have made the New Community House its home: Chicagoland Nepali Friendship Society, Nepalese Aid, and Nepali Cultural Center Chicago.

Nepalese Aid hosts programming for children and senior citizens throughout the week.

Humanity Relief helps refugees and asylum seekers find homes, home furnishings, and other services. They also help with food insecurity.

The Syrian Community Network uses the gymnasium and classrooms to provide programming for Syrian immigrant and refugee children.

== Leadership ==
Logo of the Presbyterian Church (USA)

Edgewater Presbyterian Church appoints the pastor of their congregation through a process of the Presbyterian Church (USA).

=== Pastor and moderator ===
As per the polity of the Presbyterian Church (USA), the pastor concurrently serves as moderator. He or she is a co-equal leader of the congregation alongside the Session.

During a pastoral vacancy, the Presbytery of Chicago Commission on Ministry identifies an interim pastor to serve at the pleasure of the Session. During that time, the Session convenes a Pastor Nominating Committee in search of a successor, following Presbyterian Church (USA) procedures.

==== List of pastors ====
- Rev. R.R. Stevens (1896-1898)
- Rev. Dr. Louis Perkins Cain, D.D. (1899-1918)
- Rev. Dr. Asa J. Ferry, D.D. (1921-1934)
- Rev. Dr. William Woodfin, D.D. (1934-1938)
- Rev. Dr. Adolph Bohn, D.D. (1938-1966)
- Rev. Richard Dunn (1967-1968)
- Rev. Dr. Robert C. Linthicum, D.Min. (1969-1975)
- Rev. Leland B. Issleib (1977-1991)
- Rev. Gordon Neil Butcher (1994-2001)
- Rev. Dr. Barbara H. Cathey, D. Min. (2004-2020)
- Rev. Amy Pagliarella (2018-2020) ^{co-pastor}
- Rev. Kristin E. Hutson (2022–present) ^{incumbent}

=== Session ===
The Session of Edgewater Presbyterian Church is elected from among the congregation and each person attains the office of ruling elder. In keeping with Presbyterian tradition, the office of ruling elder is an ordained ministry.

Ruling elders serve three year terms and are limited to two successive terms, after which they become non-ruling elders. Ordination as elder is held for life.

Congregations in the Presbyterian Church (USA) are normally served by a Board of Trustees and Board of Deacons. Edgewater Presbyterian Church abolished those boards and the Session retains their authorities.

Monumental decisions like changes to pastoral leadership or sale of property must be made by a vote of the congregation as a whole, not just Session.

=== Clerk of Session ===
Elected from the Session is a ruling elder who serves the office of Clerk of Session. Like the pastor, he or she serves as a visible leader of the community, speaking on behalf of the congregation in the larger public. The Clerk also serves as the primary recordkeeper of the congregation: administering the official membership rolls; records of births, baptisms, marriages, funerals, ordinations, membership; minutes of the Session and committees; approvals of building use; approvals of the administration of the Sacraments; official correspondence and communication.

When the Clerk is unavailable for a congregational meeting, the congregation as a whole must elect a secretary to serve for that meeting.

The officer of Clerk is not term-limited.

== Membership ==
=== Demographics ===
Since the 1970s, members and worship participants of Edgewater Presbyterian Church have been economically and ethnically diverse.

Some reside in lakefront condominiums or houses blocks away from the lake, some renting apartments in dense buildings, and others living in congregate housing owned by Loyola University Chicago or one of various assisted living communities in the neighborhood. The church draws some of its worship participants from a residential psychiatric rehabilitation community called Bryn Mawr Care.

Some members and worship participants are immigrants or children of immigrants. There is a great deal of representation from Nigeria and Cameroon. Membership rolls have also included Japanese Nisei and South Asian members.

Midwesterners make up the bulk of European and African American members and worship participants with representation from Chicago and downstate Illinois, Iowa, Indiana, Nebraska, Michigan, Minnesota, South Dakota, and Wisconsin.

=== LGBTQ ===
The Edgewater and adjoining Andersonville, Rogers Park, and Uptown community areas have a substantial lesbian, gay, bisexual, transgender, and queer-identifying (LGBTQ) presence. Church membership, leadership, and worship participation reflects this.

In 2010, the General Assembly passed a measure that allows ordination of openly LGBTQ teaching and ruling elders at the discretion of individual presbyteries and sessions, essentially allowing each congregation the decision to ordain or not.

Edgewater Presbyterian Church has ordained LGBTQ elders. The Presbytery of Chicago has ordained LGBTQ teaching elders who serve as pastors.

In 2014, the General Assembly passed a measure that permits pastors and the Session, “to use their own discernment to conduct same-sex marriage ceremonies where allowed by law."

In 2018, the General Assembly affirmed its commitment to the full welcome, acceptance, and inclusion of transgender persons, persons who identify as gender non-binary, and people of all gender identities into the Church. This includes the ordained ministries of elders and deacons.

At the same General Assembly, they unanimously approved a resolution saying that "religious freedom is not a license for discrimination against any of God's people and cannot justify the denial of secular employment or benefits, healthcare, public or commercial services or goods, or parental rights to persons based on race, ethnicity, sex, gender, sexual orientation, gender identity, religion or gender expression."

== Ecumenism ==
=== Denominations in full communion ===
The Presbyterian Church (USA) is in full communion with several denominations from which Edgewater Presbyterian Church has shared presiders and preachers, as needed for pulpit supply or special occasions:

- Evangelical Lutheran Church in America
- Reformed Church in America
- United Church of Christ

=== Edgewater Community Religious Association ===
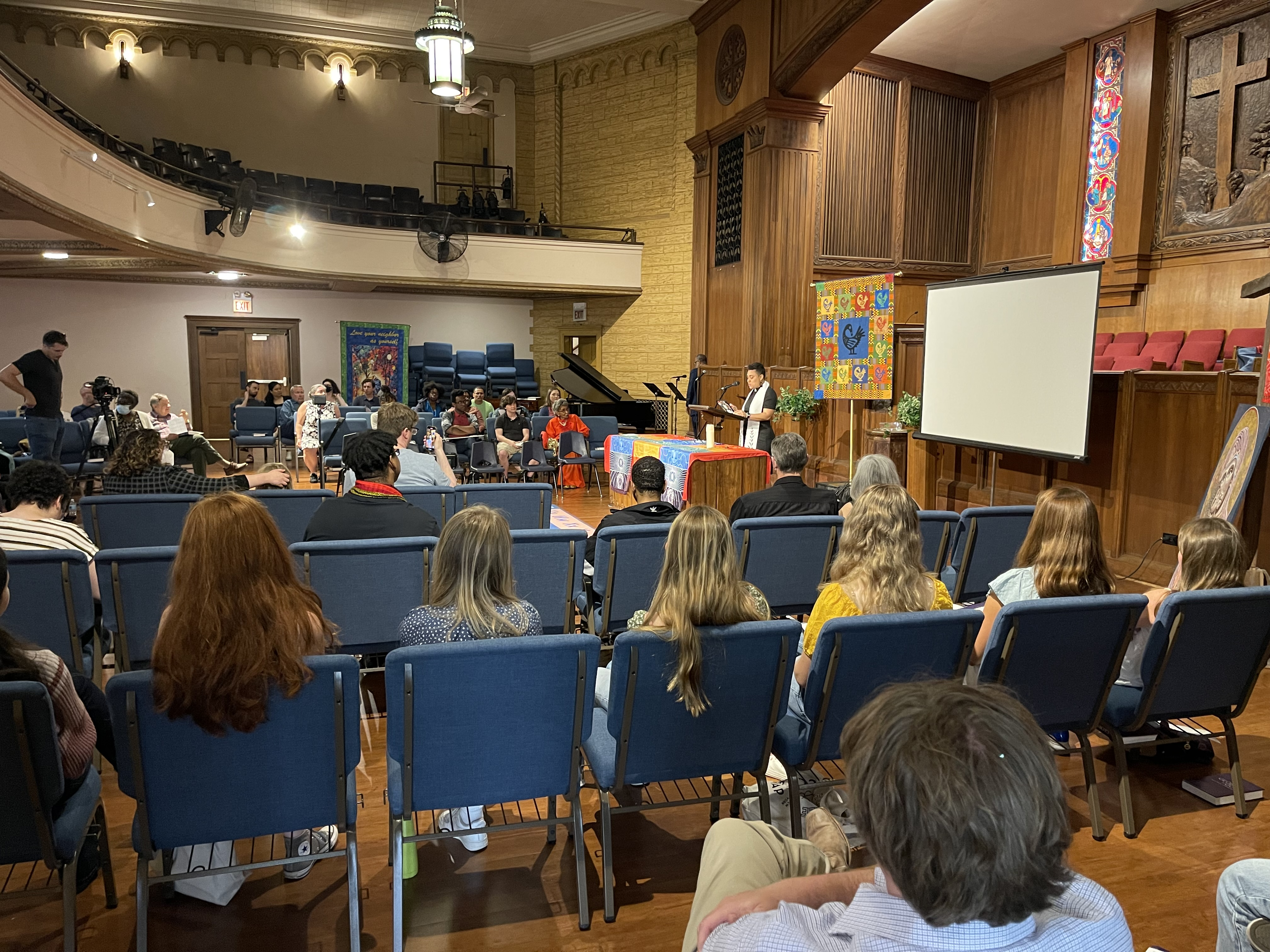
The annual ecumenical Juneteenth service brings Catholic, Protestant, Jewish, Muslim, Buddhist and other faith communities together.

Edgewater Presbyterian Church is a founding member of the Edgewater Community Religious Association (ECRA), "an interfaith association of religious organizations who work toward fostering friendships and understanding of other faiths, and to nurture a thriving and just neighborhood. For decades, ECRA has linked religiously diverse neighbors to create solutions to local problems, including the Edgewater Community Council and creating Edgewater's food pantry, Care for Real."

Its membership includes:

- Ebenezer Lutheran Church (ELCA)
- Emanuel Congregation (Union for Reform Judaism)
- EncounterPoint (Catholic)
- Church of the Atonement (Episcopal)
- Immanuel Lutheran Church (ELCA)
- Ismaili Jamatkhana (Ismaili Muslim)
- Loyola University Chicago (Catholic)
- NewStory Chicago (Baptist)
- North Shore Baptist Church (Baptist)
- Sacred Heart Schools (Catholic)
- St. Andrew's Greek Orthodox Church (Greek Orthodox)
- St. Gertrude Catholic Church (Catholic)
- The Tibet Center Chicago (Tibetan Buddhist)
- United Church of Rogers Park (Congregationalist)

ECRA religious leaders meet regularly for lunch or shared liturgy. It commemorates an annual ecumenical Juneteenth service which has been hosted by Edgewater Presbyterian Church. It also celebrates an ecumenical Thanksgiving service on the Sunday before Thanksgiving Day.

== Gallery ==
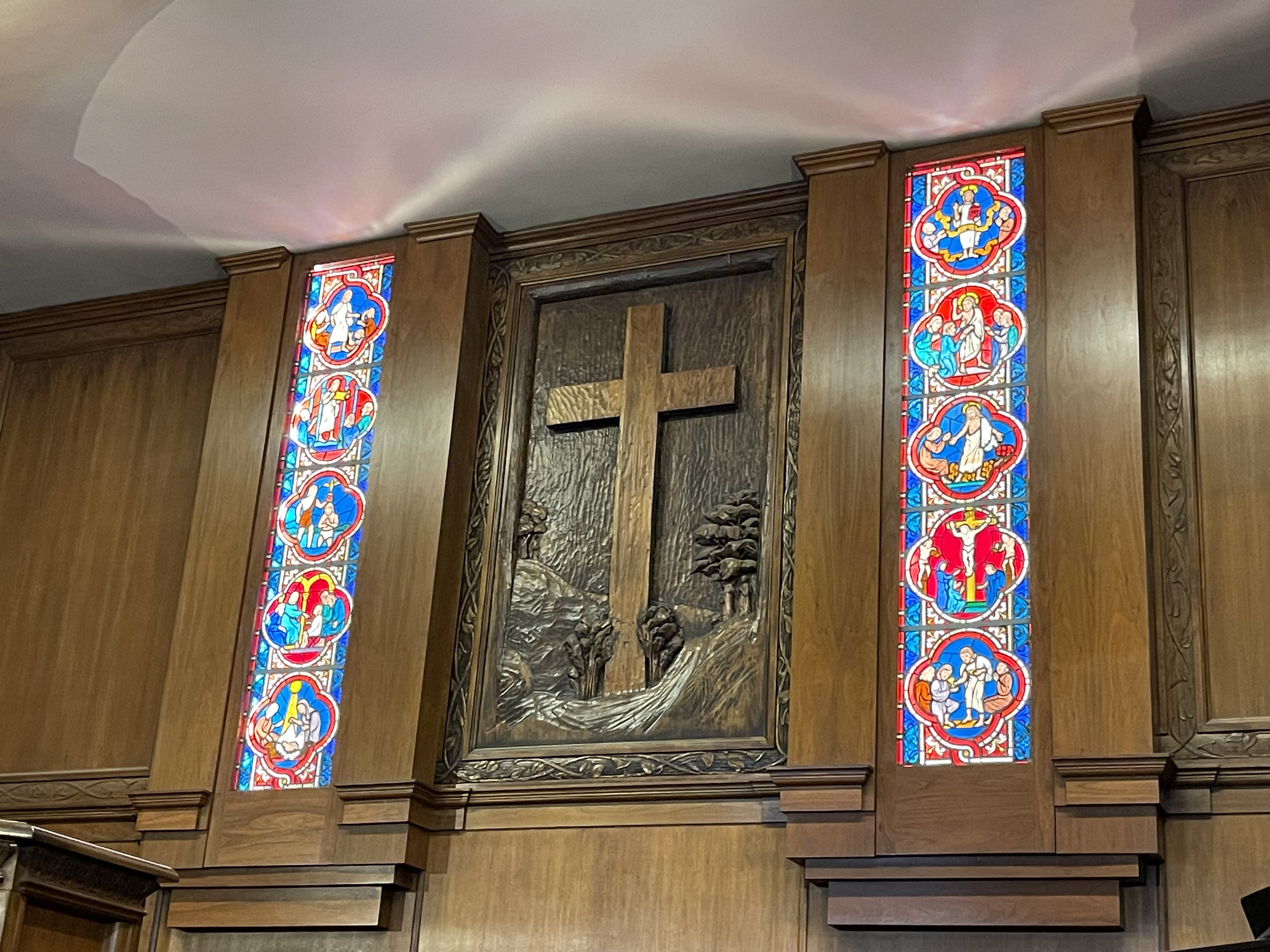
A hand-carved cross above the Sanctuary is centered between illuminated stained-glass.

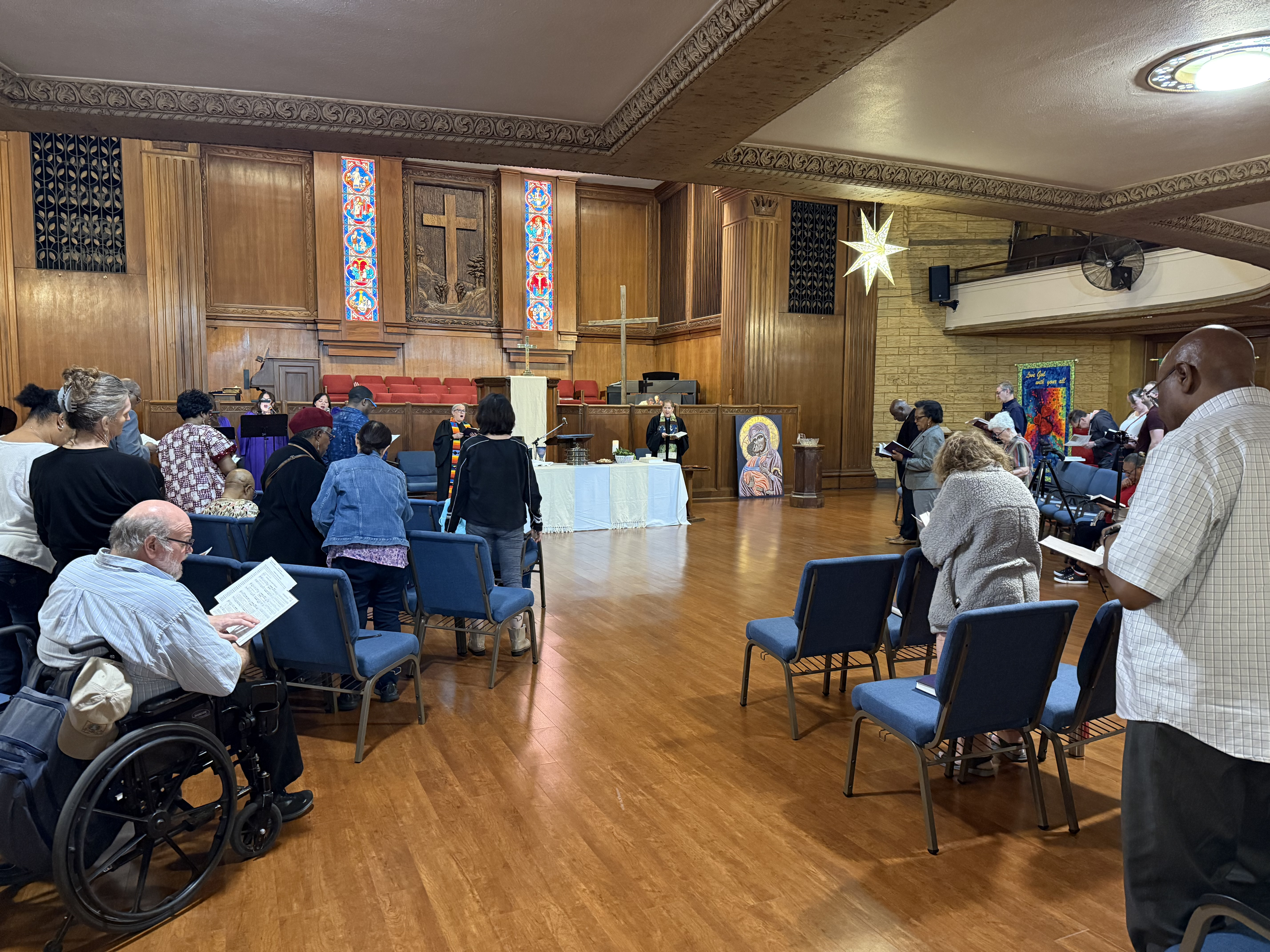
Worshippers gather in the Sanctuary during Liturgy of the Word.

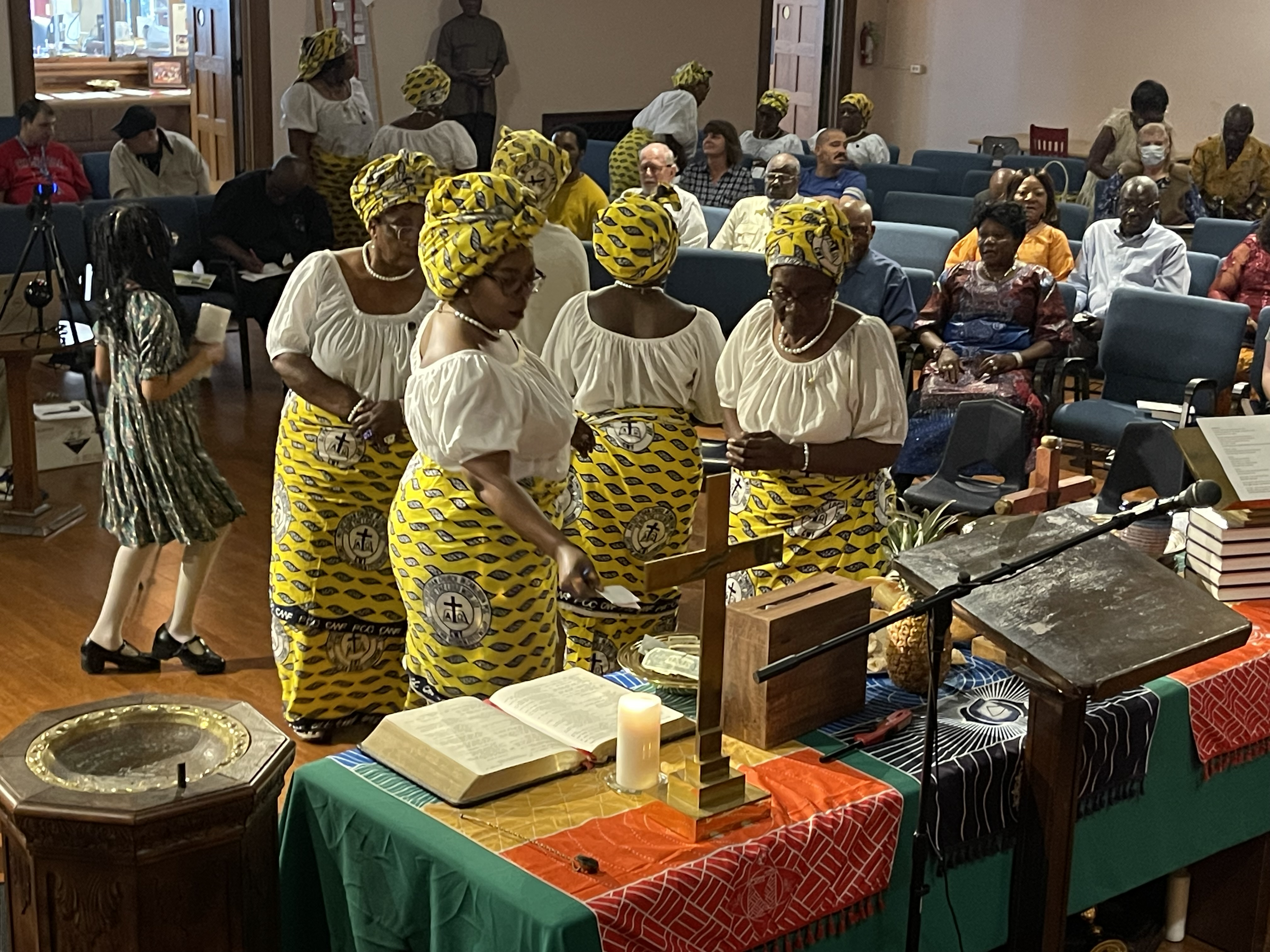
Cameroonian Christian Women Fellowship dance their tithes to the Communion table during the annual Harvest Liturgy.

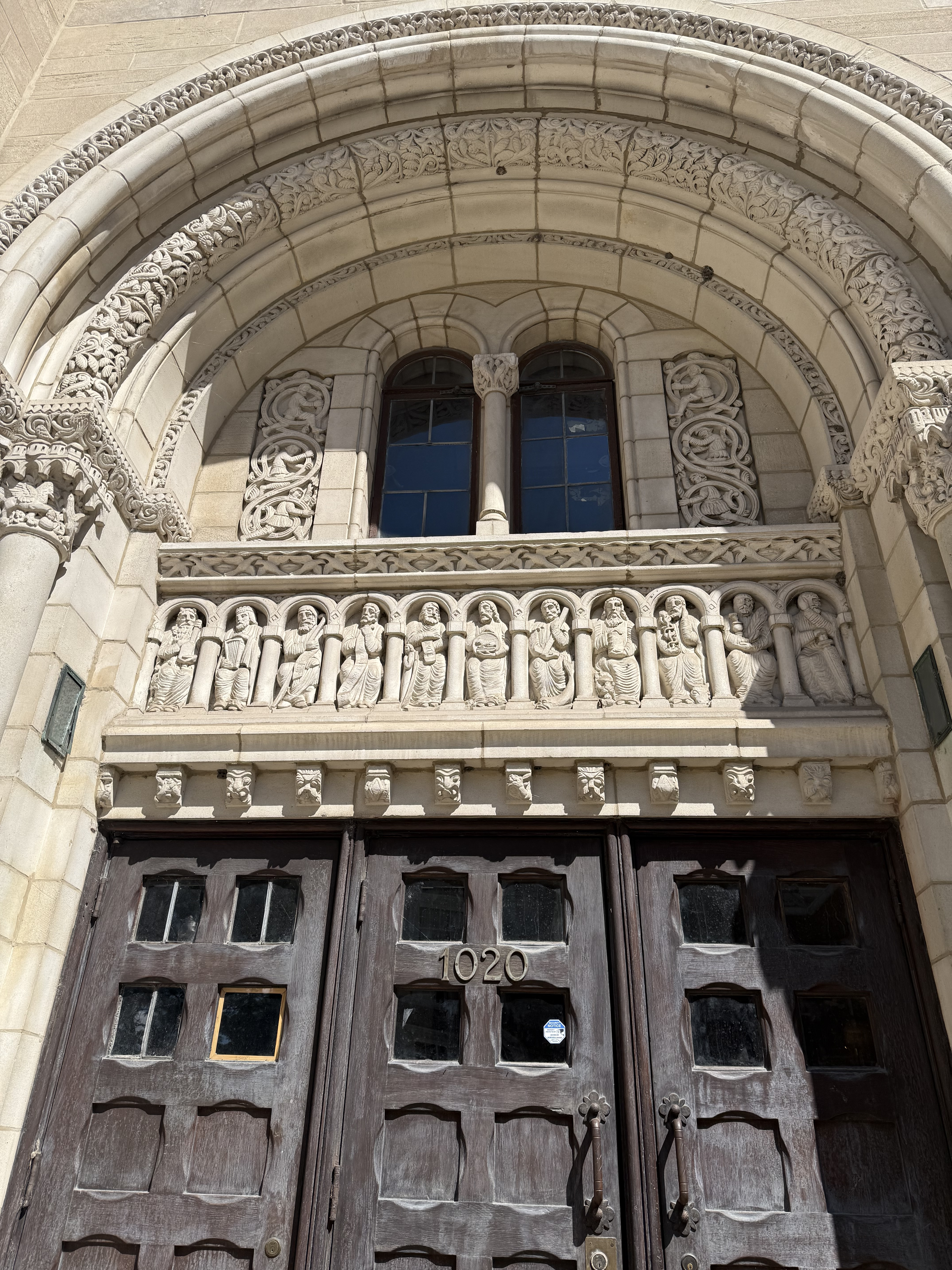
Emil Zettler sculpted the tympanum adorning the front doors on Bryn Mawr Ave. depicting biblical prophets.

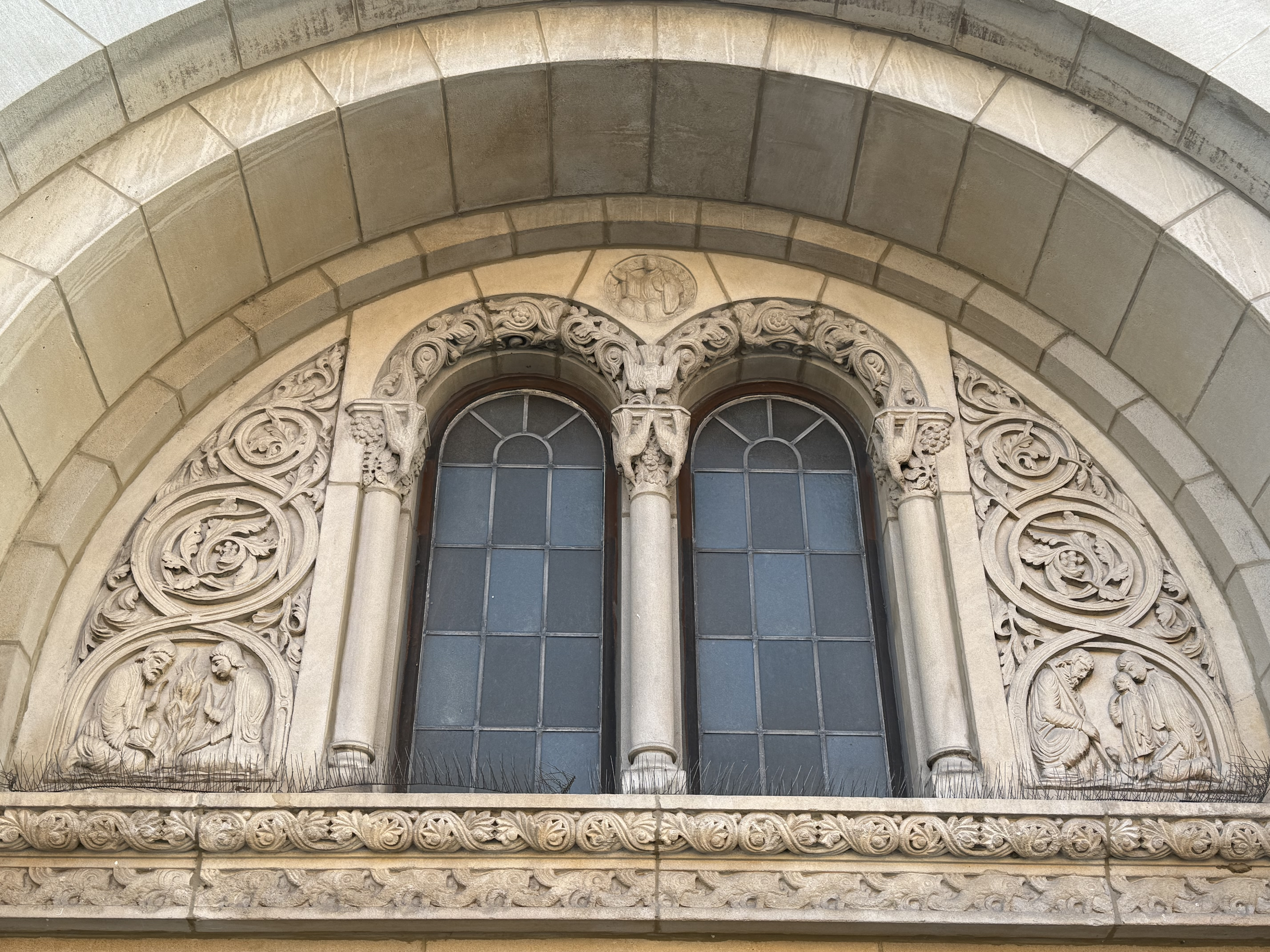
Emil Zettler sculpted the tympanum adorning the side doors on Kenmore Ave. depicting family and community themes.

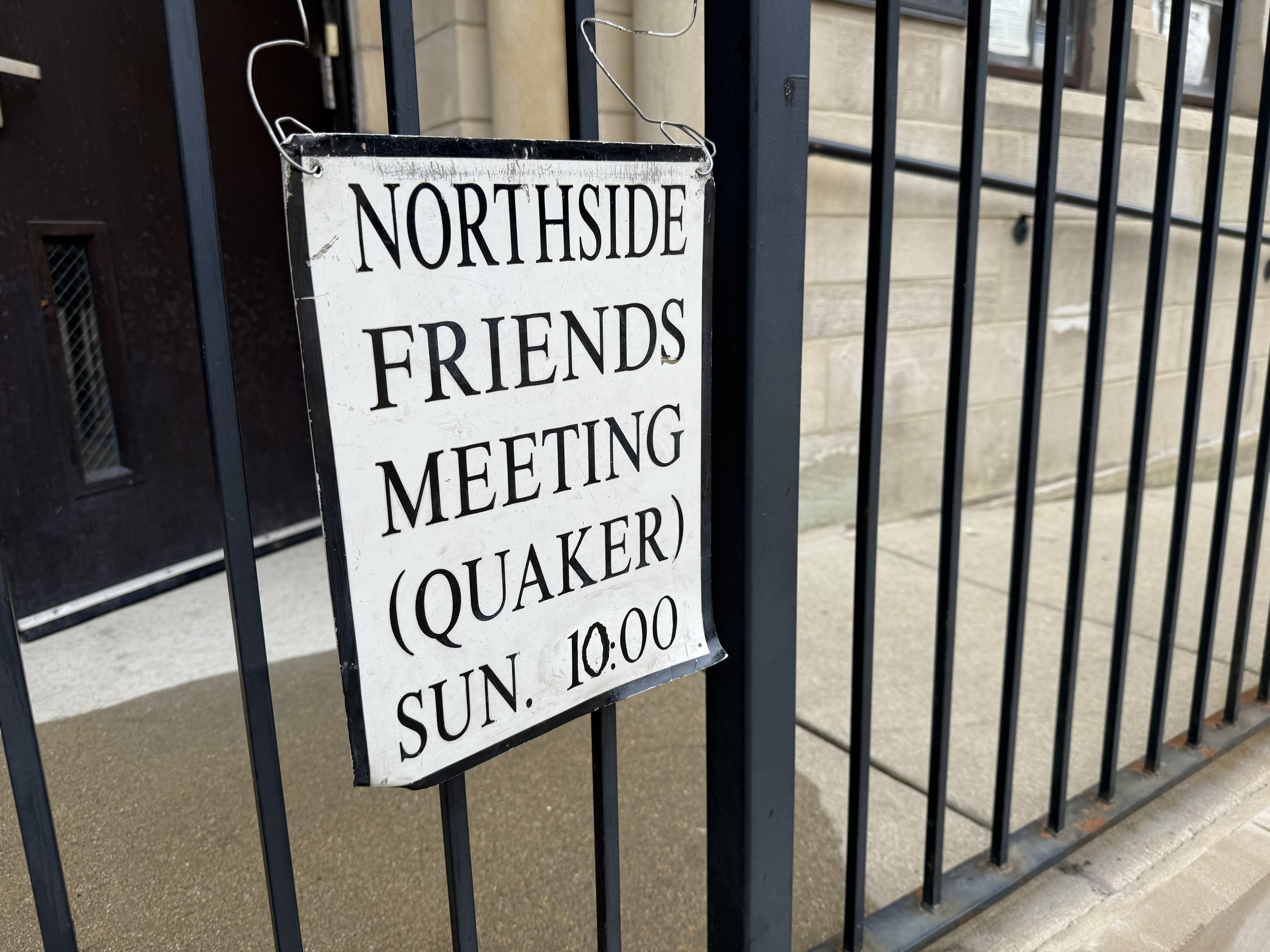
Welcome sign on Kenmore Ave. for Northside Friends Meeting, a Quaker congregation.

== Other Presbyterian churches in Chicago ==
- First Presbyterian Church
- Second Presbyterian Church
- Fourth Presbyterian Church

=== See also ===
- List of Presbyterian churches in the United States
