= Ernest A. Johnson =

Professor of economics and president of Lake Forest College (1942–1959)

Ernest Amos Johnson (10 January 1895—April 14, 1959) was a professor of economics and president of Lake Forest College from 1942 to 1959.

Ernest A. Johnson, 1946

== Early life and education ==
Ernest A. Johnson was born to Swedish parents in Ouray, Colorado on January 10, 1895. Johnson married Edith Glassford in Mesa County, Colorado on August 18, 1920. The couple had one son, Robert W. Johnson.

Johnson graduated from Colorado College in 1918 as a member of Phi Beta Kappa. After graduation, he served as an instructor in the U.S. Army Air Corps at Penn Field in Austin, Texas for less than a year. Johnson received his master's degree in economics from the University of Denver in 1924. While earning his master's degree he worked at the Western Union Telegraph Company's superintendent's office and as secretary at the Union Mutual Investment Company of Denver. He received his Doctor of Philosophy degree from Northwestern University in 1933, specializing in banking and statistics.

== Career as educator and administrator ==
In Fall 1924 Johnson was hired as an instructor in economics at Lake Forest College. In 1926 he was promoted to assistant professor, and in 1927 he was made acting head of the department of Economics and Business Administration; from 1929 to 1942 he was official chair of that department. He also occasionally taught at Northwestern University and, over the summers, at the University of Denver. In 1934, he established a student organization for advanced Economics students.

In January 1942, Johnson was appointed acting president of Lake Forest College by its Board of Trustees following the retirement of his predecessor,

Johnson donating blood to the Red Cross, Fall 1942

Herbert M. Moore. His presidency was made official in October 1943. Johnson oversaw as president the college's response to World War II, including providing evening courses for service people and industrial workers, establishing the Johns Manville-Lake Forest program for training businesswomen, the teaching of aviation to pilots and engineering to army soldiers through the Army Specialized Training Program. These achievements received official commendation from Lt. General LeRoy Lutes of the U.S. Army.

In Fall 1946 the college partnered with three corporations, Fansteel Metallurgical Co., Abbott Laboratories, and Johns-Manville Co., to establish a four-year Industrial Management Institute at the college (by 1951, Johnson Motors and the National Envelope Company had joined as well). Also in 1946, he was named chairman of the Layman's Committee of One Hundred for the Chicago Presbytery's Restoration Fund drive for reconstruction of churches in war-devastated areas. In 1947, Johnson oversaw the college's acquisition of the 27-acre Lake Forest Academy campus, or what is now the college's South Campus. Johnson led the college's Centennial fundraising program with a financial goal of $2 million by 1957 (nearly $24 million in 2026-value) for new buildings and an increased endowment. This program resulted in the construction of the college' s Alumni Memorial

Mrs. Edith Johnson laying the cornerstone of the Ernest A. Johnson Memorial Science Center, 1961

Fieldhouse in 1950. In 1949 Johnson was elected Moderator of the Chicago Presbytery, being the first layman to hold the position. In 1954 Johnson was elected president of the Presbyterian College Union, encompassing forty-three institutions. Also in 1954, he established a Public Affairs Institute at the college, cosponsored by the Lake Forest League of Women Voters and the Chicago Council on Foreign Relations. In 1958, Johnson received a Merit Award for distinction in community service from his alma mater, Northwestern University.

Johnson was president of the Associated Colleges of Illinois (est. 1952), and a director of the McCormick Theological Seminary. He was a member of Phi Delta Theta, Phi Eta Sigma, the Kiwanis Club of Lake Forest, the

Ernest A. Johnson Memorial Science Center, circa 1970

American Economics Association, the American Statistical Association, and the American Association of University Professors. During his career he had been awarded honorary degrees from: his alma mater Colorado College (Doctor of Laws, 1953), Pace College (Doctor of Commercial Science, 1956), and Blackburn College (Doctor of Civil Law, 1957).

Johnson passed away on April 14, 1959, in Lake Forest, Illinois. In 1960, the Board of Trustees established the Ernest A. Johnson Professorship of Economics in his memory. The new science hall on campus was also named in his honor, the Ernest A. Johnson Memorial Science Center.
