= Highland Park Presbyterian Church =

Highland Park Presbyterian Church could mean:

- Highland Park Presbyterian Church located in Michigan.
- Highland Park Presbyterian Church located in Illinois.
- Highland Park Presbyterian Church located in Dallas, Texas.
