= Presbytery of Chicago =

Regional judicatory of the Presbyterian Church (USA)

- Formation: 1847; 179 years ago
- Headquarters: 25 NW Point Boulevard
- Location: Elk Grove Village, Illinois, United States
- Region served: Chicago metropolitan area
- Members: 19,093 (2024)
- Moderator: Shawna Bowman
- Executive presbyter: Craig M. Howard
- Stated clerk: Kenneth Hockenberry
- Affiliations: Synod of Lincoln Trails, Presbyterian Church (USA)
- Website: chicagopresbytery.org

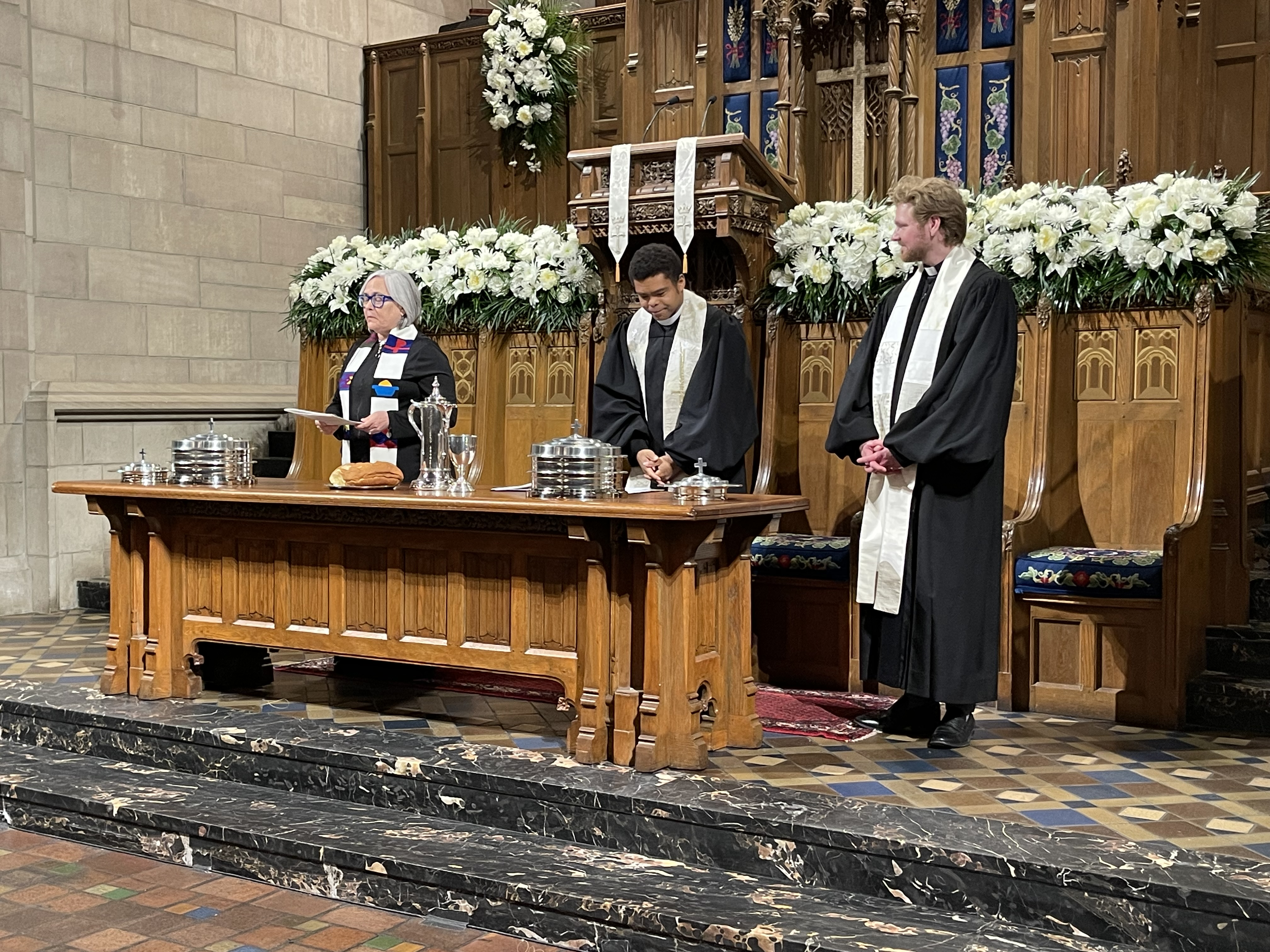
The Revs. Kristin Hutson (Edgewater), Joseph Morrow (Fourth), David Black (First) concelebrate the Eucharist for Holy Saturday.

The Presbytery of Chicago is a regional middle judicatory of the Presbyterian Church (USA), encompassing congregations and ministries within Cook, Lake, and DuPage counties in northeastern Illinois. It is headquartered in Elk Grove Village, Illinois.

== History ==
The Presbytery traces its roots to the early development of Presbyterianism in the Midwest during the 19th century. Its member congregations include some of the city's oldest and most historically significant churches, as well as newer immigrant and multicultural communities.

=== Closures and consolidation ===
With the decrease in membership across the Presbytery of Chicago, the Presbytery Assembly dissolved churches, sold properties, moved congregations, and even consolidated communities.

In 2009, Norwood Park Presbyterian Church and St. Andrews Presbyterian Church merged to create Friendship Presbyterian Church. They moved into the Norwood Park Metra Station for worship and activities before moving into a performing arts space. Partnering with a new development at 5150 N Northwest Hwy., they moved there in 2022 when construction was completed. It has since become one of the leaders in LGBTQ inclusion and social justice activism within the Presbytery.

After selling its historic property, Ravenswood Presbyterian Church chose to continue worshiping elsewhere. Its members and worship participants are largely Latin American. In 2024, the congregation partnered with Mayfair Presbyterian Church, 4358 W. Ainslie Ave., where they currently hold services.

== Structure and function ==
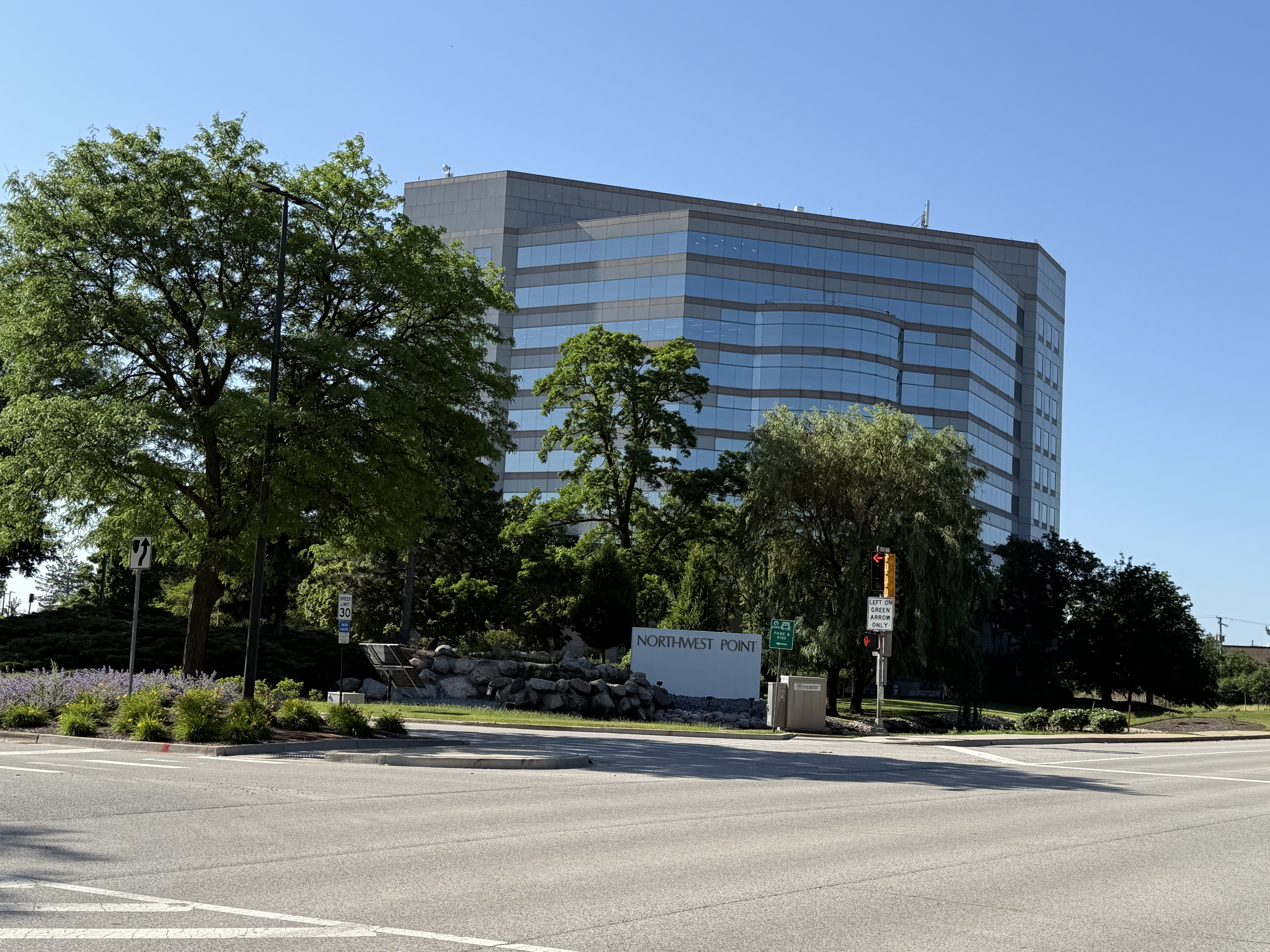
Presbytery of Chicago office building at 25 NW Point Blvd, Elk Grove Village, Illinois.

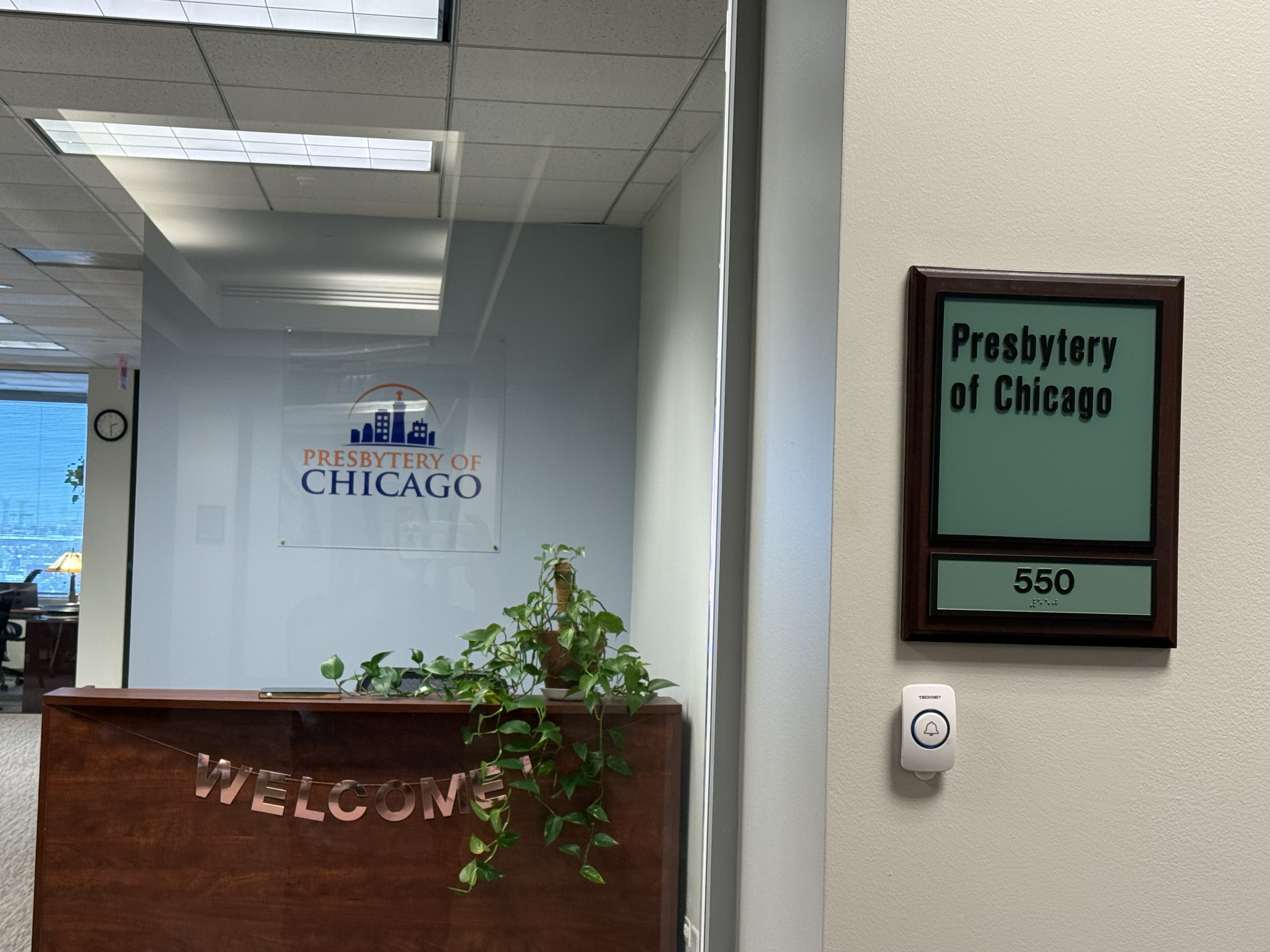
Presbytery of Chicago office in Elk Grove Village, Illinois.

The Presbytery of Chicago is a mainline Protestant body rooted in Reformed theology and the Scottish Reformation. When the Presbytery was established, it was a member of the Presbyterian Church in the United States of America. From 1958 to 1983, it was part of the United Presbyterian Church in the United States of America. Since 1983, it has been an organ of the Presbyterian Church (USA), the largest Presbyterian denomination in the U.S.

The Presbytery of Chicago is one of the largest presbyteries in the denomination, representing more than 80 congregations and fellowship communities that reflect a broad spectrum of theological, cultural, and ethnic diversity.

The Presbytery of Chicago functions as a mid-council within the Presbyterian Church (USA), positioned between the local session of each congregation and the regional Synod of Lincoln Trails, which in turn relates to the General Assembly, the national governing body of the Presbyterian Church (USA). The Presbytery Assembly elects from among its elder commissioners representatives to the General Assembly. It is convened every two years.

According to the Book of Order, “The presbytery is responsible for the government of the church throughout its district, and for assisting and supporting the witness of congregations to the sovereign activity of God in the world, so that all congregations become communities of faith, hope, love, and witness."

== Notable congregations ==
Notable congregations in the Presbytery of Chicago include:

- First Presbyterian Church, Chicago
- Second Presbyterian Church, Chicago
- Fourth Presbyterian Church, Chicago
- Edgewater Presbyterian Church, Chicago
- Highland Park Presbyterian Church, Highland Park
