= Shannon Kershner =

American Presbyterian pastor

Shannon Johnson Kershner is the current pastor of Central Presbyterian Church in Atlanta. Kershner has previously worked as pastor at Fourth Presbyterian Church in Chicago, Illinois; Black Mountain Presbyterian Church in Black Mountain, North Carolina; and Woodhaven Presbyterian Church in Irving, Texas. She graduated from Trinity University in San Antonio, Texas with a Bachelor of Arts degree before going on to receive a Master of Divinity from Columbia Theological Seminary. While studying at Columbia, Kershner served as a Pastoral Intern in Texas and Georgia, most prominently at Central Presbyterian Church in Atlanta, where she is now the pastor. Shannon has a husband named Greg Kershner, and two children, Hannah and Ryan. Greg is a Financial Advisor at Raymond James Financial and went to Baylor University before he attended Columbia Theological Seminary.
