= Emil Zettler =

German-born American sculptor (1878–1946)

Emil Robert Zettler (March 30, 1878 – January 10, 1946) American sculptor, born in Karlsruhe, Germany (or, Chicago, Illinois) and active in Chicago. The Art Institute of Chicago, where Zettler studied, awarded him the Potter Palmer Gold Medal in 1917 for his colored plaster sculpture Job. It was among the first works of art by a Chicagoan showcased at the Arts Club of Chicago.

He often worked with Prairie School architect George Grant Elmslie. He taught sculpture at the Art Institute of Chicago, rising to become head of its School of Industrial Arts. In 1931, Zettler married Edythe L. Flack, one of the Institute's assistant deans. The Institute commissioned Zettler to redesign its Frank G. Logan Medal. Among his students there was John Weaver. Zettler was tasked with designing the official medals for the Century of Progress World's Fair in 1933.

== Works ==
- Perkins, Fellows & Hamilton Studio and Office, Chicago, IL, 1917
- Capitol Building and Loan Association, Topeka, KS, 1924
- Frankenstein Memorial Chapel of Temple Sholom, Chicago, IL, 1928
- First Congregational Church of Western Springs, Western Springs, IL, 1930

== Gallery ==
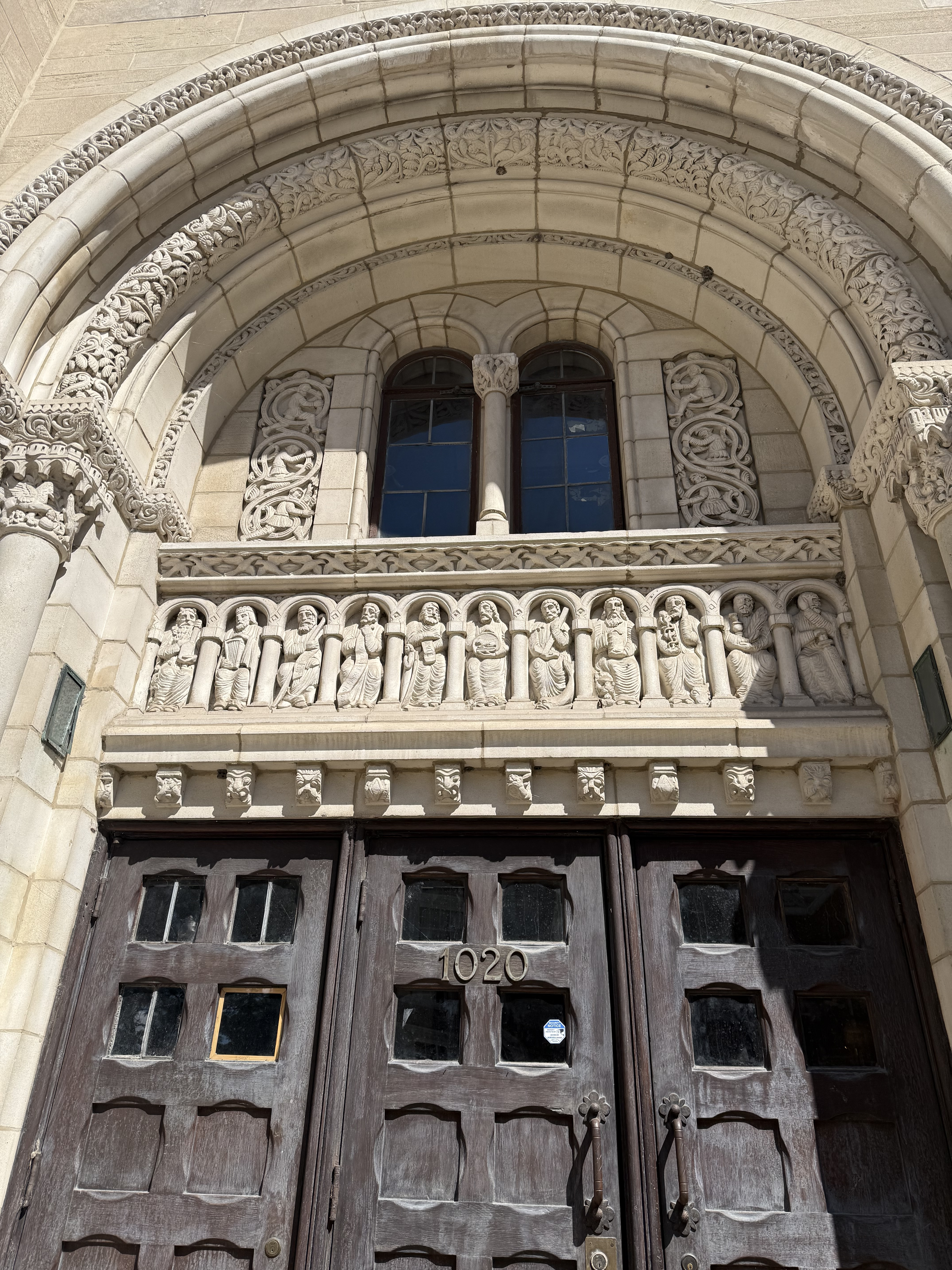
Emil Zettler sculpted the piece adorning the front doors of Edgewater Presbyterian Church depicting biblical prophets

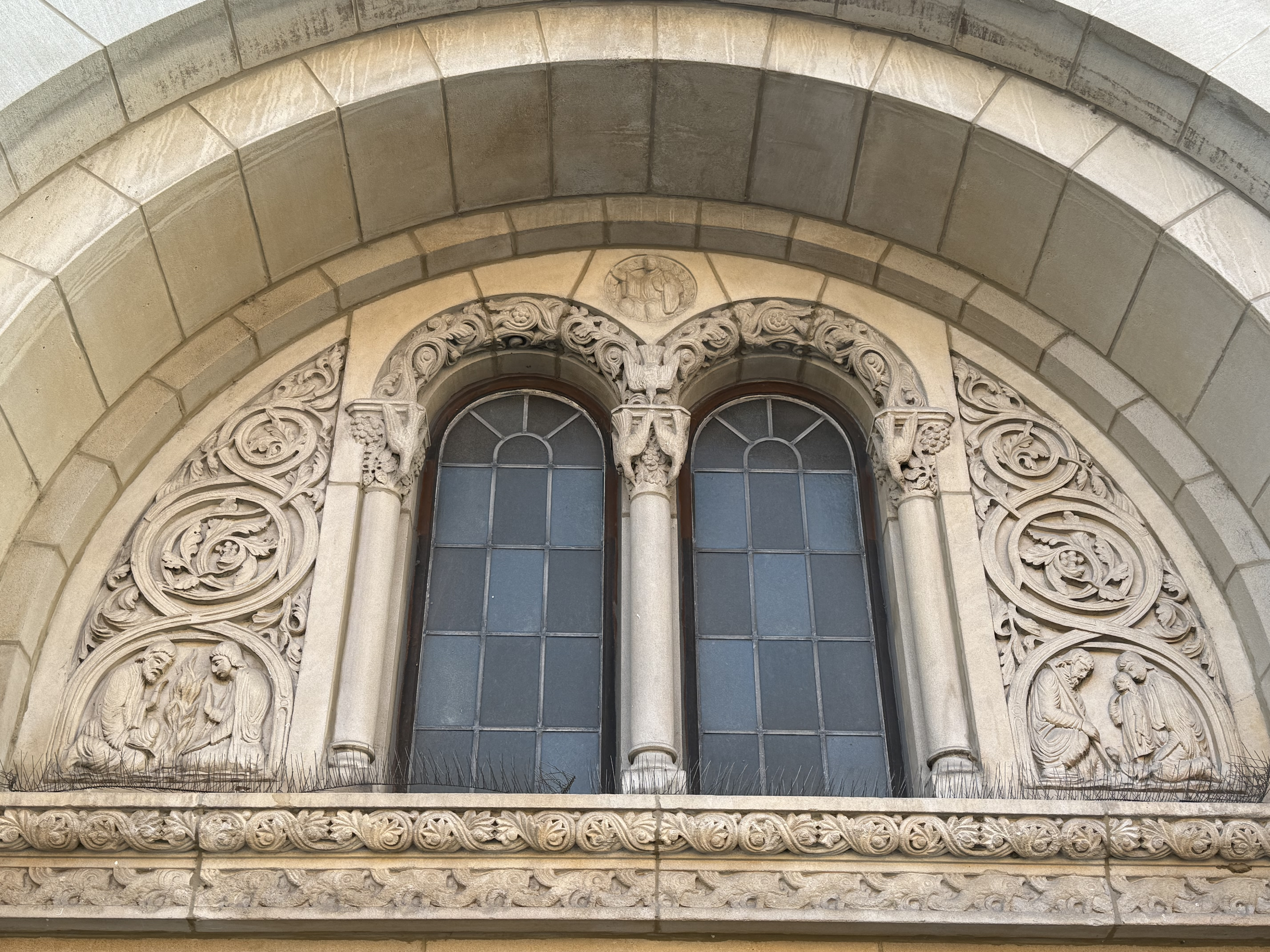
Emil Zettler sculpted the piece adorning the side doors of Edgewater Presbyterian Church depicting family and community themes
