= John Buchanan (pastor) =

American pastor (1938–2025)

John M. Buchanan (January 30, 1938 – February 3, 2025) was the pastor of Fourth Presbyterian Church in Chicago, Illinois, United States, the second largest congregation in the Presbyterian Church (USA).

He was also the editor and publisher of The Christian Century. He was also a member of the General Assembly Council from 1996 to 1999, and served as the moderator of the 208th General Assembly (1996). He was one of the founding co-moderators of The Covenant Network of Presbyterians in 1997.

In a letter dated May 18, 2010, Buchanan announced that he would retire from his duties as pastor of Fourth Presbyterian effective January 31, 2012. Buchanan remained heavily involved with Presbyterian Church USA in retirement, serving as an interim preacher at churches in the Chicago area.

He died on February 3, 2025, at the age of 87.

== Susan Buchanan ==
Among his children is Susan Buchanan, who entered into politics as a supporter of the Sandinistas in the 1980s. Buchanan has written for the Southern Poverty Law Center's HateWatch under the name "Susy Buchanan." She gained notoriety online in a 2019 recorded outburst which went viral as an Oak Park trustee, in which she derided colleagues as "white males."
