= First Congregational Church of Western Springs =

Historic church in Illinois, United States

- U.S. National Register of Historic Places
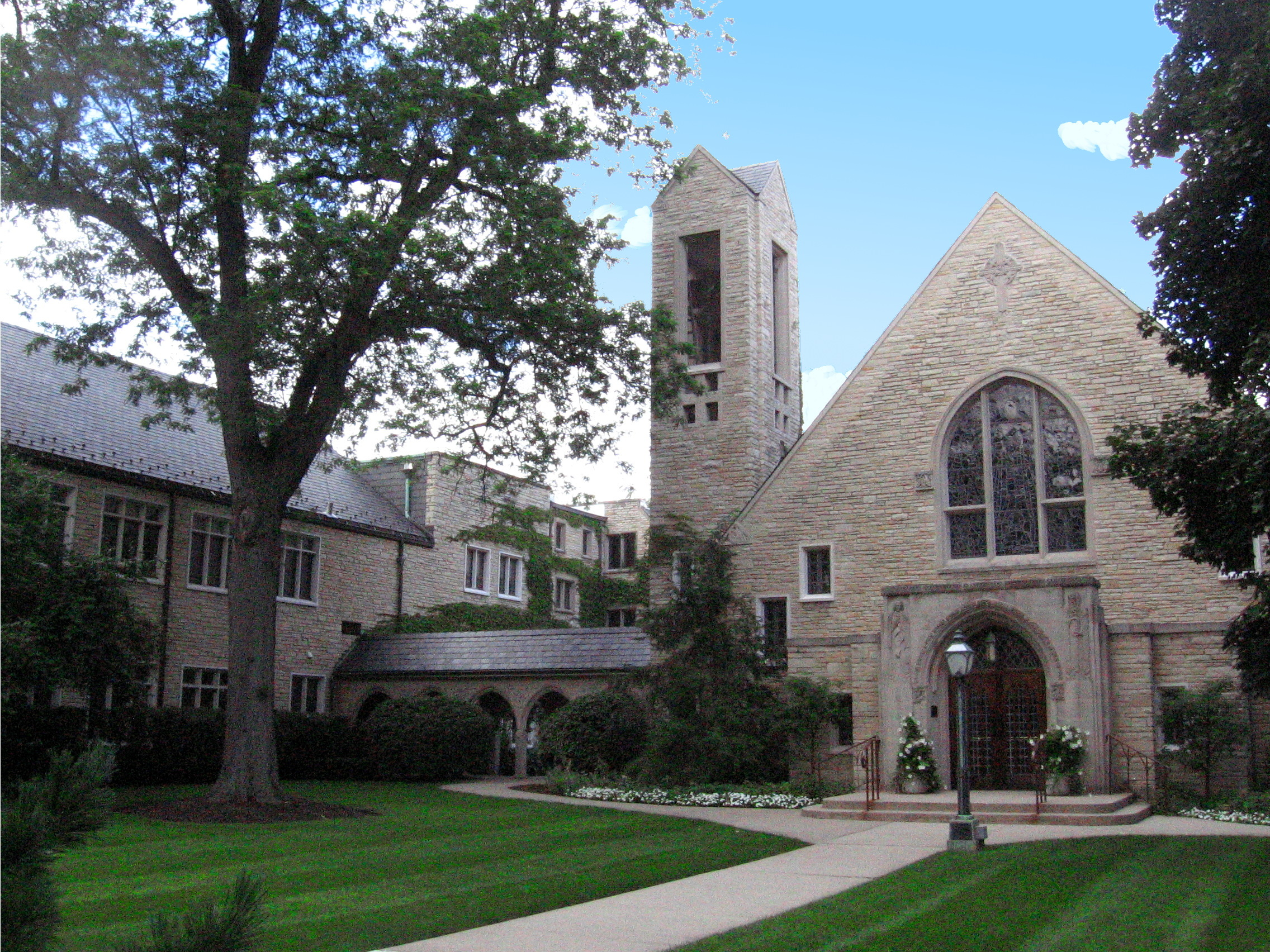

- Location within Illinois Location within the United States
- Location: 1106 Chestnut St., Western Springs, Illinois
- Coordinates: 41°48′53″N 87°54′11″W
- Area: 1.6 acres (0.65 ha)
- Built by: Soderholm & Bodett
- Architect: George Grant Elmslie
- Architectural style: Late Gothic Revival, Prairie School
- NRHP reference No.: 06000673
- Added to NRHP: August 8, 2006

The First Congregational Church of Western Springs is a historic church in Western Springs, Illinois. Designed by George Grant Elmslie, it is considered the town's finest example of Gothic Revival and Prairie School design. The church is a member of the United Church of Christ.

== History ==
The First Congregation Church of Western Springs in Illinois was founded in 1887. By the 1921, the congregation had expanded to a point where a new church building was required. In 1924, a Building and Planning Committee was formed out of the congregation to seek out an architect. Seven architects from Chicago and St. Louis were interviewed. The design submitted by George Grant Elmslie was selected as the winning bid in 1926. Elmslie had just ended a lengthy partnership with William Gray Purcell and had opened an independent practice in Chicago. The committee was fond of Elmslie's recent Capitol Building and Loan Association in Topeka, Kansas, and envisioned a similar structure.

The committee favored a Gothic Revival building, and Elmslie obliged by submitting an elaborate Gothic design. When the committee realized that the design would be too expansive, Elsmlie responded by offering a design with Prairie School elements. Construction finished in 1930 with the completion of the sanctuary and Education Building, both structures a blend of Gothic and Prairie styles. Gothic elements included a cruciform floor plan and stained glass windows from the Temple Art Glass Company of Chicago. Prairie elements include a horizontal emphasis, wood ornamentation, earth tones, and use of natural materials. Emil Zettler was commissioned to carve statues and provide decorative elements.

Herbert and William Brand designed an addition north of the Education Building in 1959. The church was surveyed during the Illinois Historic Structures Survey and, on August 8, 2006, was recognized by the National Park Service with a listing on the National Register of Historic Places.
