= Second Presbyterian Church (Chicago) =

Historic church in Illinois, United States

- U.S. National Register of Historic Places
- U.S. National Historic Landmark
- Chicago Landmark
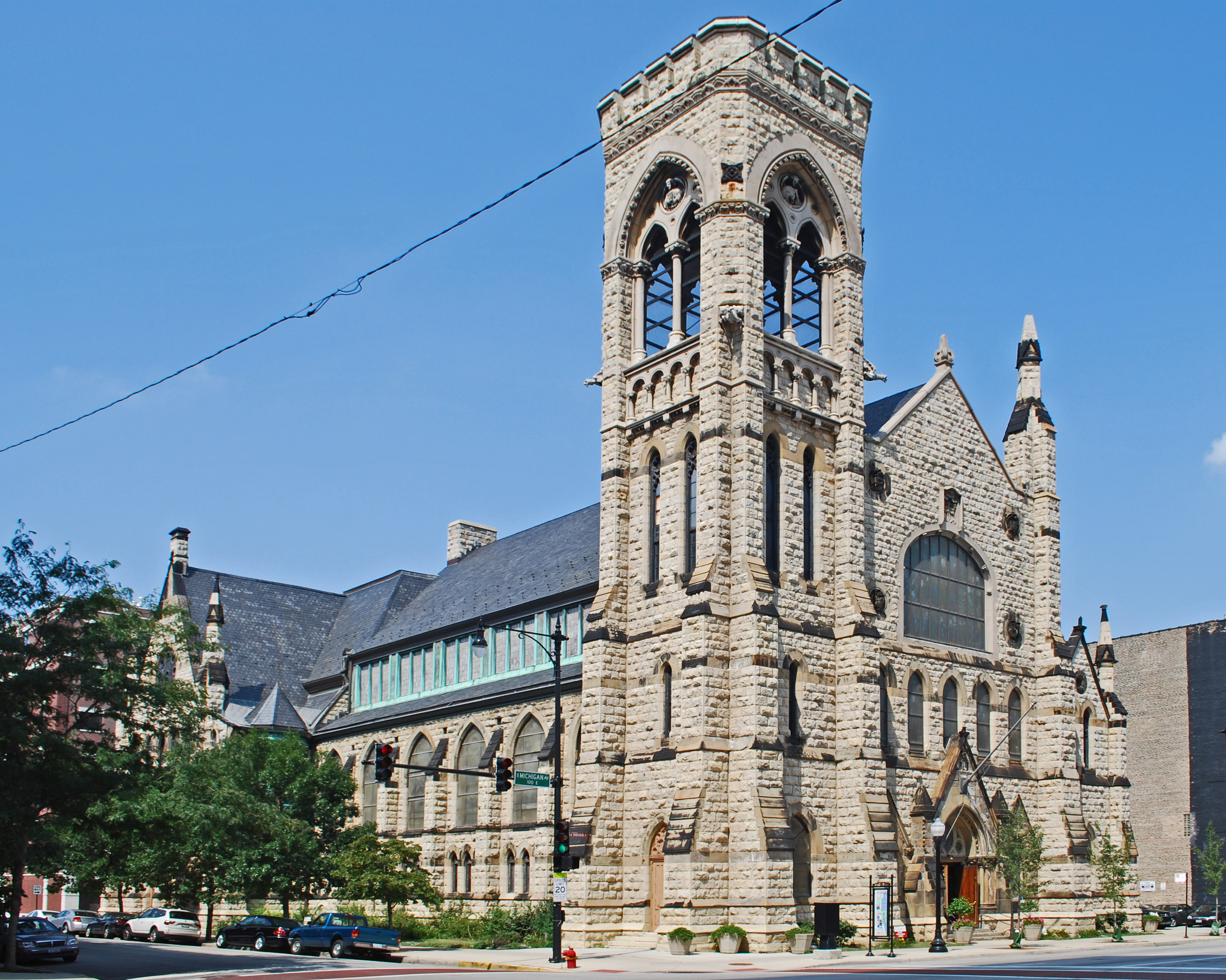
- (2010)

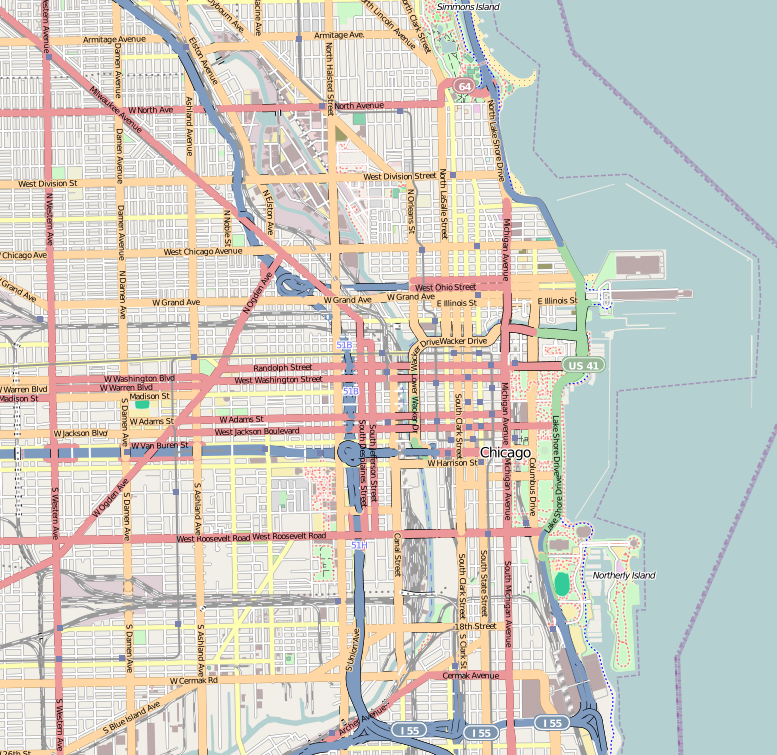
- Location within Central Chicago
- Location: 1936 South Michigan Avenue; Chicago, Illinois
- Coordinates: 41°51′21″N 87°37′28″W
- Built: 1874
- Architect: Renwick & Sands; Shaw, Howard Van Doren
- Architectural style: Late Gothic Revival
- NRHP reference No.: 74000754

Significant dates
- Added to NRHP: December 27, 1974
- Designated NHL: February 27, 2013
- Designated CHICL: September 28, 1977

Second Presbyterian Church is a landmark Gothic Revival church located on South Michigan Avenue in Chicago, Illinois, United States. In the late nineteenth and early twentieth centuries, some of Chicago's most prominent families attended this church. It is renowned for its interior, completely redone in the Arts and Crafts style after a disastrous fire in 1900. The sanctuary is one of America's best examples of an unaltered Arts and Crafts church interior, fully embodying that movement's principles of simplicity, hand craftsmanship, and unity of design. It also boasts nine imposing Tiffany windows. The church was listed on the National Register of Historic Places in 1974 and later designated a Chicago Landmark on September 28, 1977. It was designated a National Historic Landmark in March 2013.

== Congregation history ==
Second Presbyterian Church organized in 1842 as an offshoot of the city's first Presbyterian congregation, which had formed in 1833. From 1851 until 1871, the congregation worshipped in a church at the northeast corner of Wabash Avenue and Washington Street in downtown Chicago. Known as the spotted church because of the tar deposits in its limestone blocks, this building was designed by the noted eastern architect, James Renwick Jr. Renwick later designed St. Patrick's Cathedral in New York City and the original building of the Smithsonian Institution. Already in the late 1860s, downtown Chicago was becoming more commercial and less residential, and Second Presbyterian's leaders prepared plans to follow its membership to the near South Side. Just a few weeks before the Great Chicago Fire in October 1871, which destroyed the spotted church, the congregation had merged with another congregation and had relocated to the South Side.

Many wealthy Chicago residents attended Second Presbyterian, including members of the George Pullman, Silas B. Cobb, Timothy Blackstone, and George Armour families. These were men who moved to Chicago from New England or New York State in the mid-nineteenth century to make their fortunes and build a new metropolis on the prairie. Proud of their adopted city, they endowed cultural institutions like the Art Institute of Chicago and the University of Chicago. Robert Todd Lincoln, the president's son, was also a church trustee. When the South Side emerged in the 1870s as the city's premier residential neighborhood, the business elite built imposing houses on South Prairie Avenue, South Michigan Avenue, South Calumet Avenue and other streets.

As of 2023, the diverse church had about 125 members. The church "also serves many visitors seeking meals, music, and community" in addition to after-school tutoring, practice space for the South Loop Symphony Orchestra, and a basketball gymnasium.

== Beliefs ==
=== Marriage ===
The church has an inclusive vision and celebrates both opposite-sex marriages and same-sex marriages.

== Original appearance of church building ==
For its new building on South Michigan Avenue at 20th Street (now Cullerton), the congregation again turned to James Renwick. Renwick designed a church based on early English Gothic examples, with a high-pitched gable roof, a rose window in the east wall, and a corner bell tower. The exterior is clad in limestone with sandstone trim. Sculpture on the exterior is limited; the Four Evangelists and the head of Jesus appear on the entry wall on Michigan Avenue and gargoyles loom from the bell tower. The interior was also thoroughly Gothic, with pointed arches leading to the side aisles, slender iron columns supporting the balcony, and extensive stenciling adorning the walls. The sanctuary in the new building was dedicated in 1874.

In March 1900, fire gutted the sanctuary. The church turned to one of its members, Howard Van Doren Shaw, for the rebuilding. Shaw, 31 at the time, was a graduate of Yale University and the architecture program of the Massachusetts Institute of Technology. After working briefly in the office of Chicago's skyscraper pioneer William Le Baron Jenney, Shaw established his own practice. Shaw also had traveled extensively in Britain and was familiar with the work of Arts and Crafts architects like Philip Webb and C.F.A. Voysey.

== Remodeled interior ==
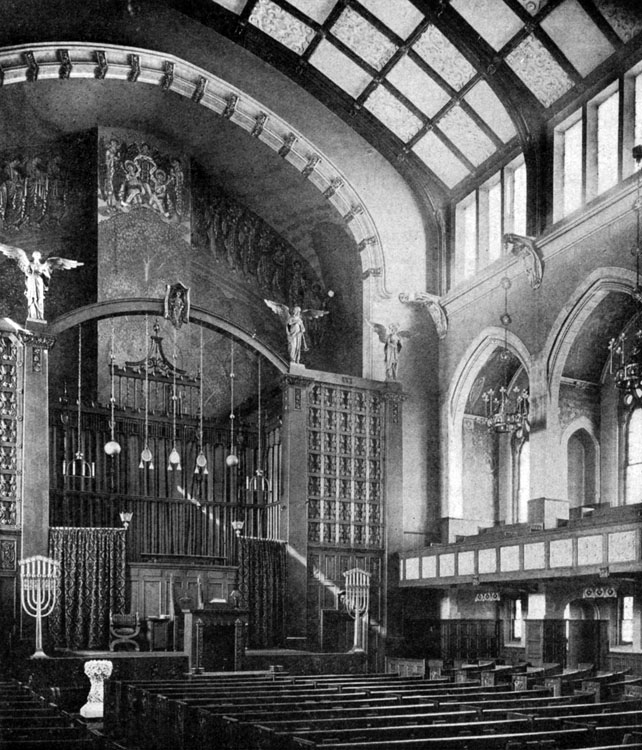
View of the remodeled sanctuary, c. 1902

Shaw, working with his friend, the painter Frederic Clay Bartlett, and several other designers and craftsmen, gave Second Presbyterian a sanctuary firmly rooted in Arts and Crafts principles. Abandoning the original neo-Gothic approach, Shaw lowered the pitch of the roof by 14 feet and moved the support columns closer to the side walls to visually increase the width of the space, and used warm stained oak and plaster panels throughout. He planned an auditorium-style sanctuary, with no central aisle that would seat 1200. This was appropriate for a congregation that emphasized preaching and musical worship. For the same reason, the pews are gently curved, providing good sight lines to the pulpit. The decorative program of the interior is rich, but subdued, emphasizing brown, buff, dusky crimson, and dull gold.

The church's figurative art, with dozens of angels in glass, wood, and plaster, and two brightly colored saints in the lobby windows, isunique for a Presbyterian congregation. Many members had seen the great cathedrals of Europe and wanted their home church to make an equivalent artistic statement.

In line with the Arts and Crafts ethos, Shaw and Bartlett designed every element of the new interior to work together to create a restful and harmonious whole. Attention was paid to every detail of pew carving, plaster casting, and fixture design. Leading Chicago area designers and craftsmen were employed for elements like the seven-armed electric candelabra flanking the pulpit (William Lau) and the four stately heralding angels standing atop the organ case (Beil & Mauch). Electric lighting was used throughout the sanctuary, and Shaw embraced the naked bulbs as design elements in the circular chandeliers and the fixtures hanging over the side aisles.

A number of recurring motifs tie the various interior elements together. The most obvious is that of the angel. Some 175 grace the interior, including the four heralding angels above the organ loft and those carved into the brackets from which the chandeliers hang. Another recurring motif is the grapevine, found in the pew ends, the light screen at the sanctuary's rear, many of Bartlett's murals, and the dull gold of the screen concealing the organ pipes. The congregation installed a Hutchins-Votey organ following the 1900 fire. The Austin Organ Co. reworked the instrument in 1917 as its Opus 767, providing it with a two-manual console and ten ranks. The organ today has 43 ranks and 2,600 pipes.

Second Presbyterian Church occupies a prominent place in Chicago's social and industrial history and its artistic heritage. Its glorious interior is now being seen by a wider audience after decades of semi-obscurity. Tours featuring the art and architecture of the building are offered on a regular schedule. Friends of Historic Second Church, organized in 2006, was formed to guide the accurate restoration of the building and to oversee tours and events.

=== Murals ===
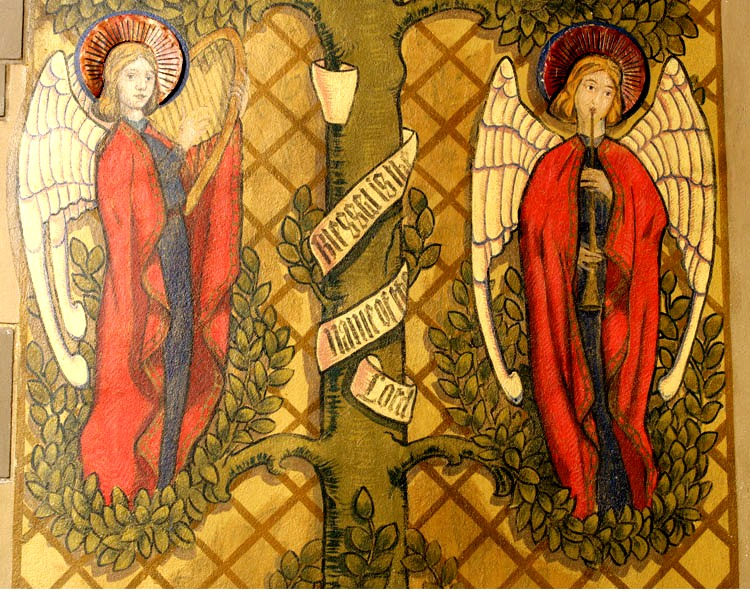
Detail of Bartlett mural

Bartlett's pre-Raphaelite murals are one of the glories of the sanctuary, and they were widely published after their completion. From a well-to-do Chicago family, Bartlett had studied painting at Munich's Royal Academy and with masters in Paris. For Second Presbyterian, Bartlett sought inspiration in the work of medieval church painters. He consciously rejected the post-Renaissance artistic tradition, with its emphasis on perspective and verisimilitude. Bartlett preferred to focus on expressiveness and spirituality, which he found in the flat and serene figures painted on the walls of medieval Italian churches. Bartlett painted directly on the dry plaster of the sanctuary's vertical walls. The paintings in the ceilings of the arches were done on canvas in his studio and then mounted in the church. Bartlett's figures have bold outlines and sumptuous robes of muted blue, crimson, and green. He used gold leaf extensively and supplied relief to features like haloes with a plaster technique known as pargeting.

The majestic 40-foot-wide mural behind the altar represents the tree of life surmounted by a heavenly rainbow. Above that is a celestial orchestra in medieval robes. Bartlett's care in blending decoration to the sanctuary's architecture is evident; his rainbow echoes the curve of the ceiling. Bartlett's work in the twelve bays of the balcony centers on the themes of praise, abundance, and sacred music. Texts from scripture are painted on the walls below the figures.

Many of these murals were restored in the 2010s and early 2020s.

=== Windows ===
When the sanctuary was rededicated in 1901, many of its arched openings contained simple windows with small, stylized floral designs by Shaw and executed by the firm of Gianini and Hilgart. Between 1894 and 1927, the bays began to be filled with specially commissioned memorial windows. Now, only the last bay on the north side of the church displays Shaw's work. Members of the congregation gave the other windows in memory of departed loved ones. Nine of the windows are by Louis Comfort Tiffany's firm and display many of the innovative glass-working techniques that he pioneered. Tiffany looked to get artistic effects from the character of the glass itself rather than by painting on the glass. He used folded glass, confetti glass, striated glass, and multiple layers of glass. The windows portray a variety of Biblical scenes, landscapes, and ornamental designs. In the east end of the church is a boldly colored representation of the Ascension, designed by William Fair Kline. Below it are the five scourges or Arma Christi of Jesus. Other sanctuary windows were designed by Louis J. Millet and McCully & Miles.

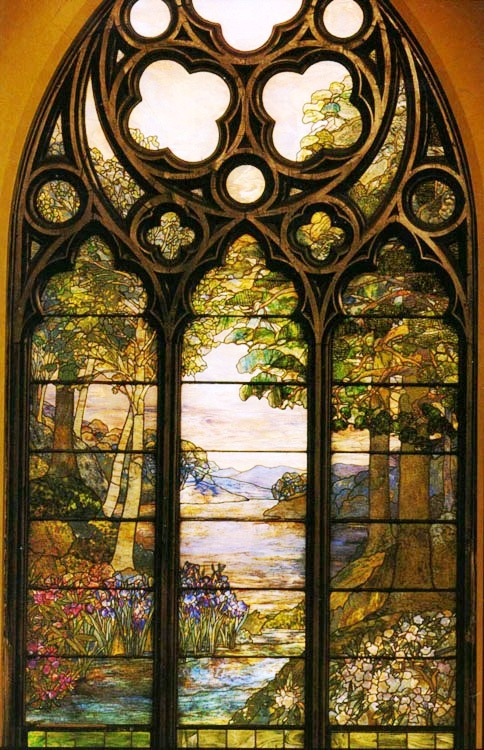
Pastoral window by Tiffany Studios, 1917

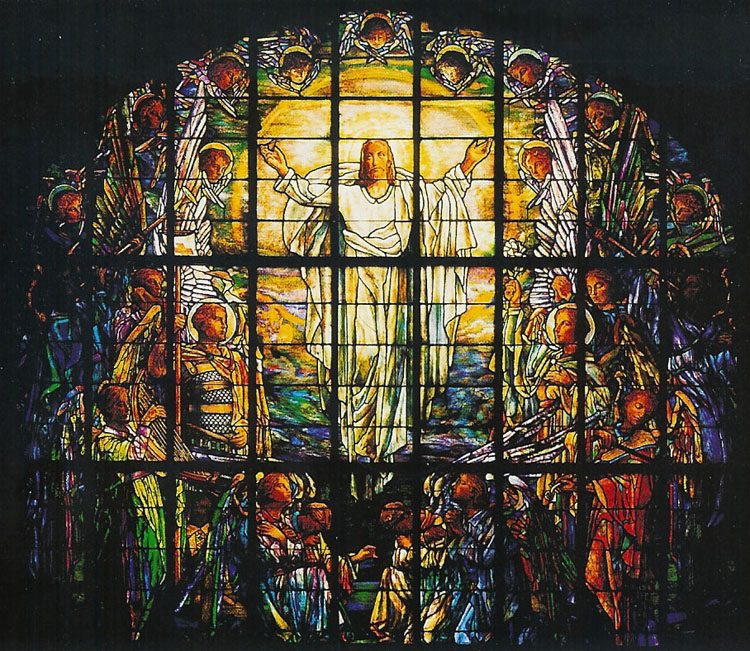
Ascension window by William Fair Kline, 1903

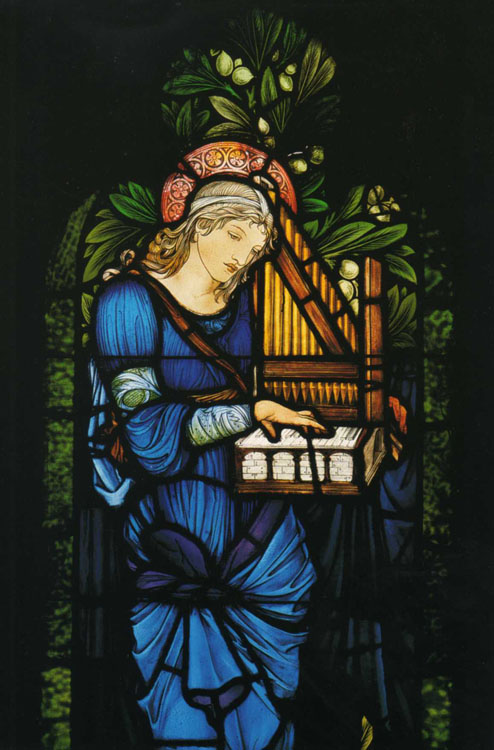
St. Cecilia window by Edward Burne-Jones, late 19th century

The two Edward Burne-Jones windows in the lobby tie Second Presbyterian directly to the British Arts and Crafts Movement. Burne-Jones was a close associate of William Morris, founder of the Arts and Crafts in Britain. Morris and Co. crafted these two windows from the designs of Burne-Jones. The subjects are St. Margaret of Antioch, in robes of rich crimson, and St. Cecilia, in blue robes, a portable organ in her arms. These windows were displayed in the William Morris Memorial Room of Chicago's Tobey Furniture Co. before being purchased by the Franklin Darius Gray family and made into memorials. Burne-Jones windows are rare in the United States; these are the only ones known outside of the East Coast.

In a multi-million dollar project, several windows have completed extensive renovation and repair and additional window repair was ongoing as of 2023.

== See also ==
- List of Chicago Landmarks
- National Register of Historic Places listings in South Side Chicago
- List of National Historic Landmarks in Illinois
- List of Presbyterian churches in the United States

=== Other Presbyterian churches in Chicago ===
- Presbytery of Chicago
- First Presbyterian Church
- Fourth Presbyterian Church
- Edgewater Presbyterian Church
