= Highland Park Presbyterian Church (Illinois) =

The Highland Park Presbyterian Church is a Presbyterian congregation in Highland Park, Illinois. The church traces its origins back to 1871.

In meetings in 1871, the Highland Park Religious Association, a group of twenty people of various religious denominations, met in Highland Park, Illinois to decide what type of church to organize in their community. They took a vote and decided to found the Highland Park Presbyterian Church. The congregation was formally organized June 2, 1871, with thirty-three charter members. Initially meeting in Central Hall of Highland Park (a site now occupied by Highland Park State Bank), the congregation dedicated their first church building in 1874. That structure was replaced in 1911 by the present "modern gothic" structure furnished with a pipe organ having 1,754 pipes, at a total cost of $100,000. The church is at 330 Laurel Avenue. The manse was erected in 1900, with additions in 1918 and 1923. A chapel seating 110 persons, along with a parlor and educational rooms was dedicated in 1961. A Rogers/Rufatti hybrid organ with 30 ranks of pipes as well as electronic components was dedicated in 2004.

By the church's 75th anniversary in 1946, membership stood at 1200. Membership by 1996 stood at 400.

The Pastor of the church is David A. Perkins.

== Notable members ==
- Elisha Gray, 19th-century electrical inventor, and competitor with Alexander Graham Bell for credit for inventing the telephone. Grey demonstrated his telephone invention in the church in 1874.
- Jim Tilmon, the fifth African American to become a US airline pilot, and a meteorologist and aviation expert on WMAQ-TV TV station in Chicago who also appeared nationally on NBC news programs.
