= First Presbyterian Church (Chicago) =

1833 church in Chicago, Illinois, US

Coordinates: 41°46′42.6″N 87°35′42.0″W

The First Presbyterian Church of Chicago
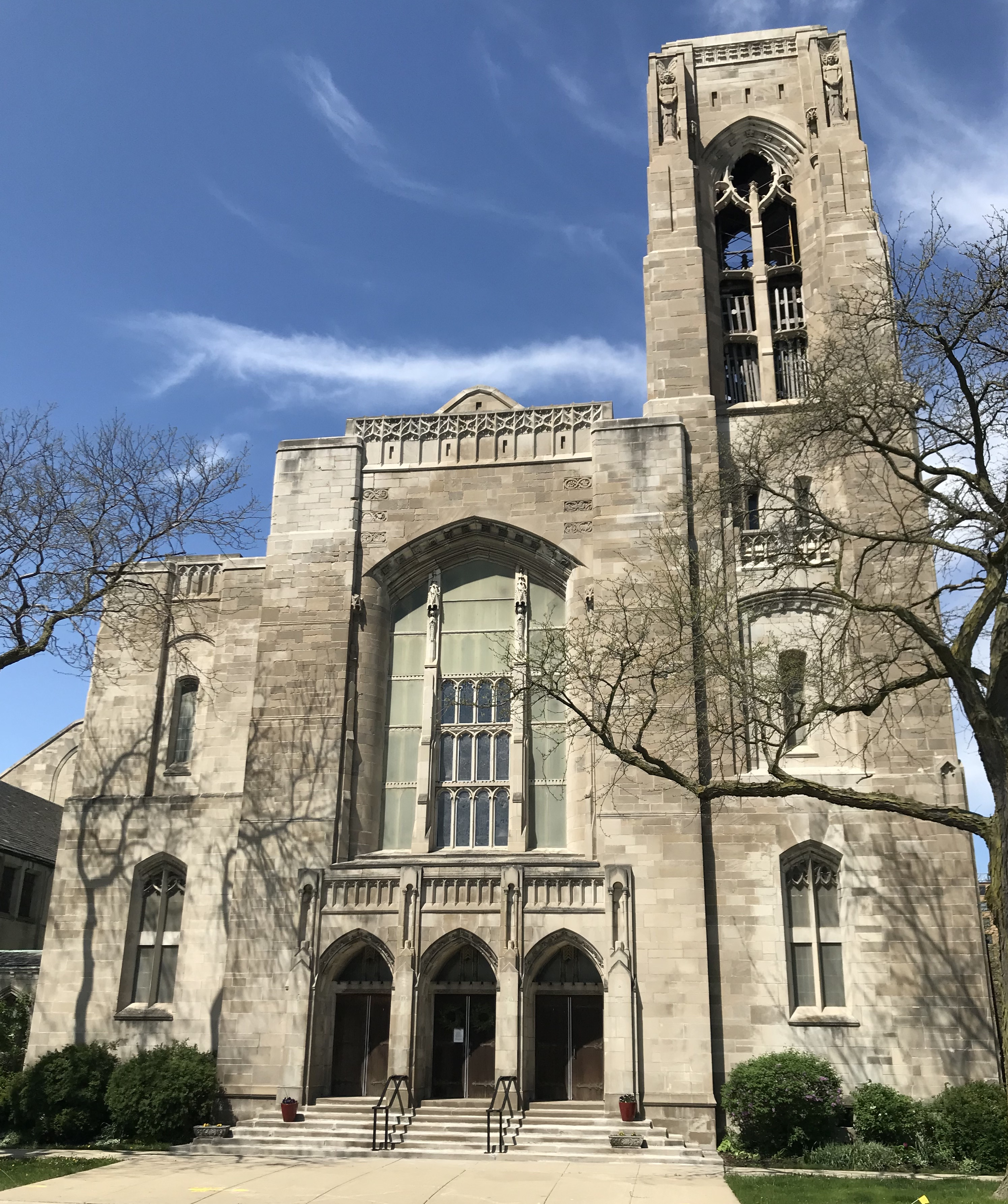

- Location within Chicago metropolitan area
- Location: Woodlawn, Chicago, Illinois
- Denomination: Presbyterian Church (USA)
- Website: chicagofirstchurch.org

History
- Status: Church
- Founded: June 26, 1833

Architecture
- Functional status: Active
- Architect(s): Thomas Tallmadge & Vernon S. Watson
- Architectural type: Gothic Revival

Administration
- Parish: Woodlawn

Clergy
- Pastor: Rev. David J. Black

The First Presbyterian Church (Chicago) is the first Presbyterian Church in Chicago, Illinois, United States. It is arguably the first church organized in Chicago. It is the oldest continuously operating institution in Chicago, predating by two months the founding of Chicago as a town. The first public school and first Head Start programs in the region were started in its buildings. Early members of the church included Chicago's first pharmacist and Chicago's first public school teacher, as well as the founders of the first regional abolitionist society.

The church building is a Gothic Revival cathedral built at 6400 South Kimbark Avenue in 1927.

== History ==
The First Presbyterian Church of Chicago had its beginning in the arrival of a ship off the shore of Lake Michigan near the mouth of the Chicago River on May 12, 1833. Aboard the ship was the nucleus of Chicago's first Presbyterian society, as well as the man destined to be its founder, Jeremiah Porter, a young missionary. So rough was the lake that the little schooner, further hampered by the lack of an adequate harbor, tossed about on the waves, unable to land until the following day – a delay which provided ample time for the Rev. Jeremiah Porter to contemplate the odd chance that had brought here to Illinois country. – from A History of The First Presbyterian Church of Chicago, 1833–1941

The First Presbyterian Church has its origins in an August 1832 prayer meeting and Sunday-school held by Philo Carpenter in a carpentry shop, which was owned by Mark Beaubien at Fort Dearborn. Although there were changes in location, these services continued during the winter of 1832–33. Eventually, they were held at a cabin owned by "Father" Walker. At this location, Rev. Jeremiah Porter formally organized the church. On June 26, 1833, the church adopted the Covenant and Articles of Faith in the Presbytery of Detroit.

The first public school in Chicago was organized in the meeting house of The First Presbyterian Church, and Porter's wife Eliza Chappell was the first teacher in this school. The membership of the church increased within a few months from 26 to 47, and to accommodate both soldiers and citizens, preaching services were held for a time both in the fort and at Father Walker's cabin on Wolf Point. On June 11, a committee was appointed to solicit subscriptions for the construction of a meeting house. Porter suggested that any money subscribed toward his support might be applied to the building fund. In the meantime, the American Home Mission Society made provisions for Porter.

The erection of the first house of worship was quite an event in the settlement. "Nearly all the inhabitants aided in the construction of this building, and the undertaking was so stupendous that every shoulder was needed at the wheel." The meetinghouse, built by Joseph Meeker, stood out in the open field without any fence around it, on what was later the alley of the lot at the southwest corner of Lake and Clark Streets, on the south 25 feet (7.6 m) of lot 1 in block 34 in the Original Town of Chicago. The Chicago Daily Democrat (1834) noted:

"The First Presbyterian Church has purchased lot 1 in block 34. The books of the Title Guarantee and Trust Co. do not, however, show any record of such a purchase. We can only infer that for the two years or more the Society was in possession of this lot it must have been by permission of the Trustees of the Illinois and Michigan Canal, who held title to the land."

The lot was purchased at the canal sale, June, 1836, more than two years after the meeting house was built, by James Curtiss, secretary of the Illinois Hotel Company. The hotel scheme collapsed in the panic of 1835–37, and thus the church was providentially permitted to continue in possession another year, until a new location was procured farther south on Clark Street, below Washington Street.

The new building was a plain frame structure, about 40 by 25 feet (12.2 m × 7.6 m), with plastered walls and bare puncheon floors. The cost was $600. The seating arrangements consisted of benches made of ordinary pine boards, which would accommodate about 200, including settlers and the troops from the garrison. In the spring months, when the water in the ditch in front of the church made it almost inaccessible, the benches taken from the church were the ordinary means for bridging the slough. Such was "Chicago's first built Protestant meeting house, commonly called 'the Lord's House', and a useful building it was to the first settlers." It was dedicated January 4, 1834; Porter was assisted in the dedicatory services by Rev. A. B. Freeman, pastor of the First Baptist Church, who offered the consecration prayer.

From 1833 to 1835 the membership increased to about 100, and, as the church was then self-supporting, Porter felt justified in accepting a call to the Main Street Presbyterian Church of Peoria, Illinois, in the autumn of 1835.

During the two years which elapsed before a successor to Porter was secured, the pulpit was supplied partly by Rev. Isaac T. Hinton, pastor of the First Baptist Church, Rev. William McLean and Rev. J. J. Miter. Eventually, Rev. Dr. John Blatchford was called as the church's first installed pastor.

Aspirations to erect a cathedral, "to be built of marble," were dispelled by the financial depression of 1837. For a few years, the parishioners had to content themselves with their simple frame meeting house, although some desired changes were effected in its condition and location. The former situation had become undesirable, as the adjacent property was in demand for business purposes, and the people were going to the southern part of the city for their homes, "away out on the prairies below Van Buren Street." The building was moved in 1837–38 from its original position on Clark Street, near Lake Street, to the corner of Clark Street and the alley now known as Calhoun Place, south of Washington Street and facing Clark Street, being the south fifty feet of lot 1, in block 56, Original Town of Chicago. During the seven years following and prior to the purchase of the land by the Society, the owners did not demand any rental, as they "regarded the presence of the church a blessing to the whole community." After two years of unceasing labor, Rev. Dr. Blatchford's health gave way and he was obliged to terminate his work in Chicago. He was dismissed from the pastorate August 18, 1839, at his own request.

The nine years' ministry of Rev. Flavel Bascom, D.D., covered a period of remarkable growth in the membership and affairs of the church. The old frame meeting house was again enlarged by increasing its width, and, as the Society was now in a condition to have a home of its own, plans were under consideration for a permanent building.

May 7, 1844, the church purchased from Samuel and F. A. Russell, all of lot 1 in block 56, Original Town of Chicago, on the south end of which the "Wooden Church " was then standing. Though the trustees acquired a frontage of eighty feet on Washington Street and one hundred and eighty feet on Clark Street, the space was not sufficient to give proper light and ventilation for the building contemplated. An agreement was thereupon entered into with Robert Freeman, whereby title was acquired to the east twenty-seven feet of lot 2 in block 56, immediately west of and adjoining lot 1. The deed from Freeman to the church trustees was recorded December 19, 1849. This made a total frontage of one hundred and seven feet on Washington Street. The foundations of the "Brick Church" were laid in 1847, and in September, 1849, the building was dedicated.' In the meantime the finances of the Society were in such a condition that it became necessary for the trustees to sell a portion of the lot, according to an advertisement which appeared in the Daily Tribune of July 20, 1848.

=== Brick church building ===
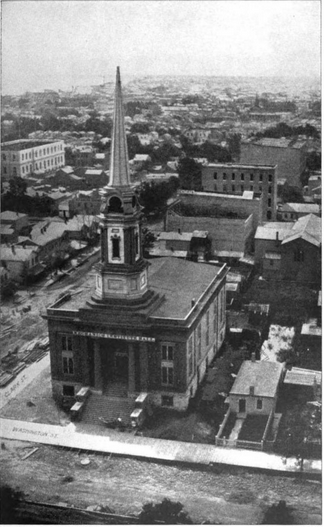
First Presbyterian Church, Chicago, 1857, ("The Brick Church")

Seven years later, it became necessary for the church to move still farther south, and on October 19, 1855, the trustees entered into a contract for the sale of the remaining portion of this ground, covering the 175 feet (53 m) frontage on Washington Street and the 130 feet (40 m) on Clark Street, with the brick edifice, to Hugh Maher at a price of $65,000. Philip F. W. Peck purchased this contract from Maher, and received a deed, dated November 22, 1855, signed by the trustees. He wished to get all the title the church had, and that he might be sure he was dealing with the people calling themselves the First Presbyterian Church, he named the Society in the body of the deed in four distinct ways:

- The First Presbyterian Church and Society of Chicago, otherwise known as
- The Presbyterian Church and Society of Chicago, otherwise known as
- The Presbyterian Church of Chicago, otherwise known as
- The First Presbyterian Church in the City of Chicago.

This property then became the site of the Chicago Opera House building. After the Society moved to Wabash Avenue in 1857 the "Brick Church" was used for various purposes. In 1858, it was occupied by the Mechanics' Institute. About the beginning of the war, it was converted into a music hall, known as Smith & Nixon Hall, and was a popular place for concerts and lectures. The "Brick Church" had been dedicated in September, 1849, and soon after, Bascom severed his connection with the church.

In consequence of dissension on the slavery question, twenty-six members withdrew in 1842 to form the Second Presbyterian Church.

=== Wabash Avenue church building ===
During the ministry of Dr. Humphrey the towers of the church building on Wabash Avenue were completed. March 27, 1864, a new brick and stone building for the use of the Railroad Mission, erected at a cost of about $18,000, was appropriately dedicated. The building stood on the east side of Griswold Street, on the premises now known as 48 and 5O Pacific Avenue. A new chapel was built at 45 and 47 Congress Street, and was dedicated June 2, 1867. In 1868, the church supported five mission schools—the Railroad, Foster, Sands, Indiana Street and Archer Avenue Missions—all of which, except the Railroad Mission, have since been transferred to the care of other churches.

The records of the Session contain this note regarding the destruction of the church on Wabash Avenue in the great fire of October, 1871: "On Sunday, October 8, a collection was taken in the church for the benefit of the sufferers from a severe conflagration which had visited the West Side on Saturday night. It was Communion Sunday; none realized that it was the last one in the old church, around which so many precious memories clustered. That night a fire broke out in the West Division, crossed to the South Side, and then to the North, destroying a large portion of the city. Early on Monday morning, our beautiful church home, as well as its beautiful chapel and the Railroad Mission chapel, was destroyed. Nothing was saved but the records of the church, the Communion service and the Sexton library."

=== Kimbark and 64th Street building ===
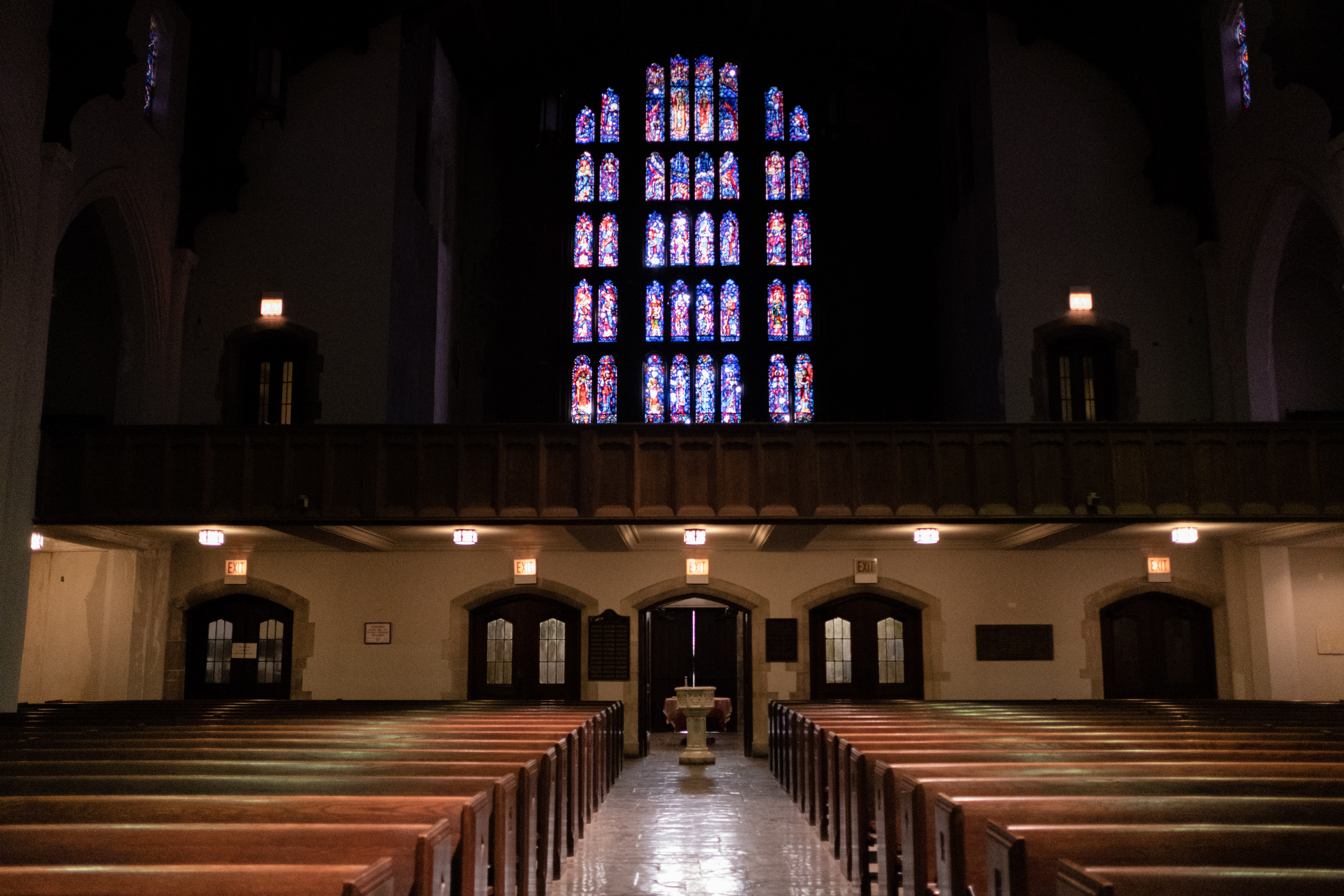
The Great East Window inside the sanctuary

In 1927 the congregation began to build the current structure, its sixth building, which was designed by the Chicago architectural firm of Thomas Tallmadge and Vernon Watson. The cross-shaped American Gothic sanctuary was dedicated on October 14, 1928. Immediately south of the sanctuary is a garden area, known as the garth, as well as a wing of the building complex that includes a large fellowship hall, kitchen, meeting rooms, classrooms, an art studio and a gymnasium. Adjacent to the fellowship hall is a greenhouse, currently under renovation to serve the church garden plots at 65th and Woodlawn. The stained glass windows were designed by two different studios, R. Toland Wright of Cleveland, and Willett Studies of Philadelphia. All are memorials and were installed in stages as funds were raised. The windows of the nave, the seating section of the sanctuary, were designed by R. Toland Wright Studios to portray the life of Jesus. Each window contains two scenes from the Gospels. Below each of the scenes, an angel holds a scroll with a Biblical passage written on it. Above each scene, there is a symbol representing that passage.

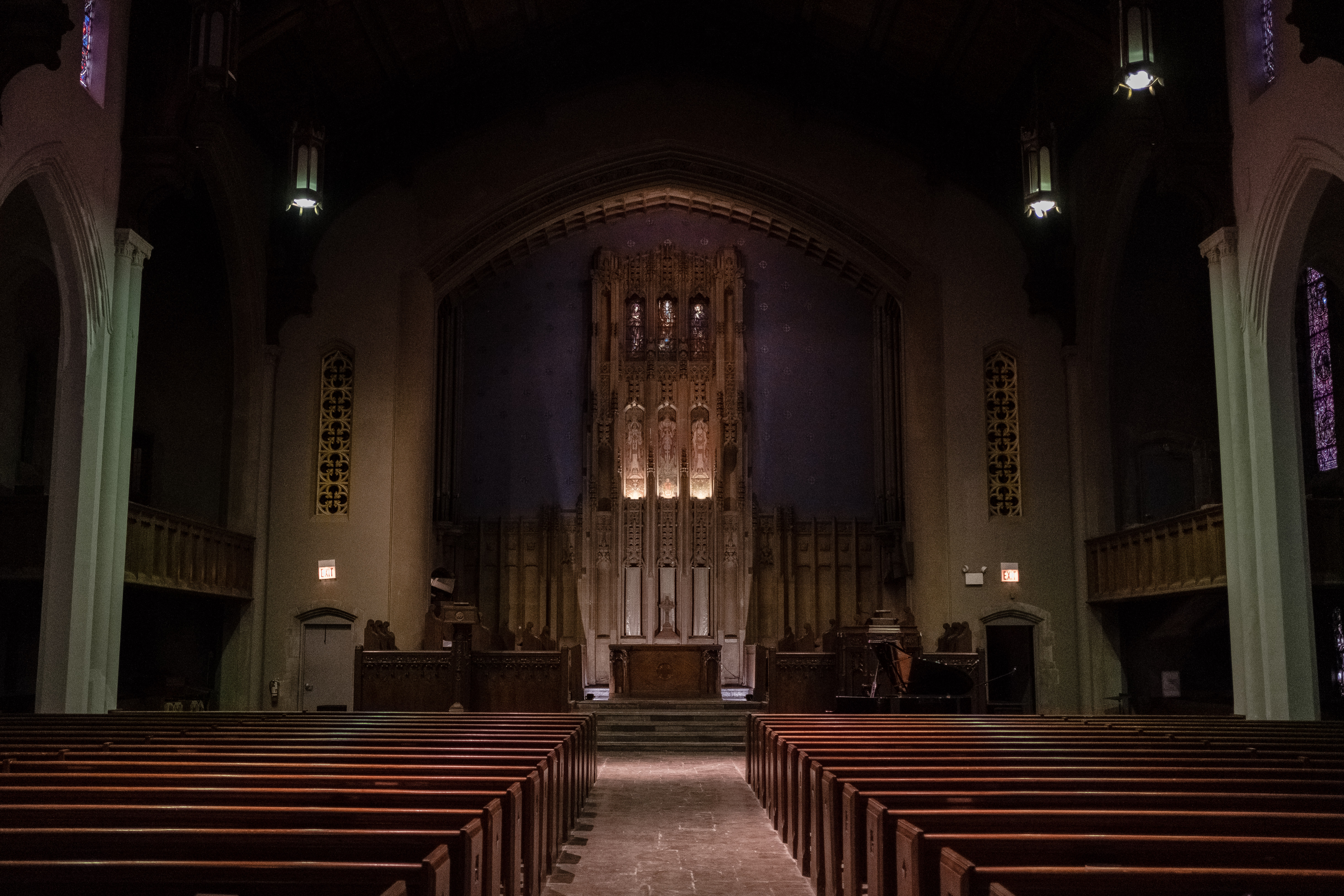
Inside the sanctuary at the Kimbark Church, facing the altar

At the very top of the sanctuary walls, the clerestory windows can be seen.

The Great East Window, which has forty different sections, was designed by Willett Studios. Its purpose is to honor the women of the Bible. Throughout the panels, one can see women represented as teachers, nurses, scholars, artists, and musicians. At the top of the window are two figures of Christs, one to represent his Divine nature, the other his human. Directly below Jesus is Mary holding him when he was a baby.

In October 1968 the upper south transept windows which looked out from the Minister's Study and those in the study were destroyed by a fire.

Another project by Willet Studios is the reredos which towers forty feet behind the altar. The three windows at the top: the center is the “Lord enthroned in glory,” the left, in a blue robe with a starry nimbus, is Mary, and on the right in red garments is John. Below are three murals, painted by Jean J. Myall, depicting St. Gabriel, St. Michael, and St. Raphael.

The North transept memorial windows were designed and installed by Willett Studios. Upper Transept windows echo the nave windows with scenes from the life of Jesus Christ. The lower transept windows feature “Ruth the Gleaner” and “Dorcas the Helper.”

John Henry Barrows was the pastor from 1881 to 1896.

== Bibliography ==
- Otis, Philo Adams (1900). The First Presbyterian Church: a history of the oldest organization in Chicago : with biographical sketches of the pastors and copious extracts from the choir records (Public domain ed.). C.F. Summy Company. p. 4.
- Otis, Philo Adams (1913). The First Presbyterian Church (Public domain ed.). Chicago: F.H. Revell Company. p. 22. ISBN 978-5-88230-217-6.
