= List of Presbyterian Church (USA) synods and presbyteries =

This article lists the names of the 16 synods and 164 presbyteries in the Presbyterian Church (U.S.A.).

== Synods ==
There are 16 synods in PC(USA). A synod is a regional governing body that is made up of presbyteries. Synods are classified as either programmatic or reduced-function.

The following are the synods of the PC(USA):

- Synod of Alaska-Northwest
- Synod of Boriquen (Puerto Rico)
- Synod of the Covenant (programmatic)
- Synod of Lakes and Prairies (programmatic)
- Synod of Lincoln Trails (programmatic)
- Synod of Living Waters (programmatic)
- Synod of Mid-America (programmatic)
- Synod of the Mid-Atlantic (programmatic)
- Synod of the Northeast (programmatic)
- Synod of the Pacific
- Synod of the Rocky Mountains
- Synod of South Atlantic
- Synod of Southern California and Hawaii (programmatic)
- Synod of the Southwest (programmatic)
- Synod of the Sun (programmatic)
- Synod of the Trinity (programmatic)

== Presbyteries ==
There are 164 presbyteries in PC(USA). A presbytery is a regional governing body or lower judicatories that is made up of local churches. In official communications, many of these presbyteries use "Presbytery of" in front of their names, for example, "Presbytery of The James."

=== Synod of Alaska-Northwest ===
- Inland Northwest
- Northwest Coast
- Olympia
- Seattle
- Yukon

=== Synod of Boriquen (Puerto Rico) ===
- Noroeste (Northwest)
- San Juan
- Suroeste (Southwest)

=== Synod of the Covenant ===
- Cincinnati
- Detroit
- Eastminster
- Lake Huron
- Lake Michigan
- Mackinac
- Maumee Valley
- Miami Valley
- Muskingum Valley
- Scioto Valley
- Western Reserve

=== Synod of Lakes and Prairies ===
- Central Nebraska
- Dakota
- Des Moines
- East Iowa
- Homestead
- John Knox
- Milwaukee
- Minnesota Valleys
- Missouri River Valley
- North Central Iowa
- Northern Plains
- Northern Waters
- Prospect Hill
- South Dakota
- Twin Cities Area
- Winnebago

=== Synod of Lincoln Trails ===
- Blackhawk
- Chicago
- Great Rivers
- Midwest Korean American
- Ohio Valley
- Southeastern Illinois
- Wabash Valley
- Whitewater Valley

=== Synod of Living Waters ===
- East Tennessee
- Holston
- Mid-Kentucky
- Mid-South
- Middle Tennessee
- Mississippi
- North Alabama
- St. Andrew
- Presbytery of Sheppards & Lapsley
- South Alabama
- Transylvania
- Western Kentucky

=== Synod of Mid-America ===
- Giddings-Lovejoy
- Heartland
- John Calvin
- Missouri Union
- Northern Kansas
- Southern Kansas

=== Synod of the Mid-Atlantic ===
- Abingdon
- Atlantic Korean
- Baltimore
- Charlotte
- Coastal Carolina
- Eastern Virginia
- The James
- National Capital
- New Castle
- New Hope
- The Peaks
- Salem
- Shenandoah
- Western North Carolina

=== Synod of the Northeast ===
- Albany
- Boston
- Cayuga-Syracuse
- Coastlands
- Eastern Korean
- Genesee Valley
- Geneva
- Highlands
- Hudson River
- Long Island
- New York City
- Northeast New Jersey
- Northern New England
- Northern New York
- Southern New England
- (The Presbytery For) Southern New Jersey
- Susquehanna Valley
- Utica
- Western New York

=== Synod of the Pacific ===
- Cascades
- Eastern Oregon
- Nevada
- North Central California
- Redwoods
- San Francisco
- San Joaquin
- San Jose
- Snake River (2025 merger Boise+Kendall)

=== Synod of the Rocky Mountains ===
- Denver
- Glacier
- Plains and Peaks
- Pueblo
- Utah
- Western Colorado
- Wyoming
- Yellowstone

=== Synod of South Atlantic ===
- Central Florida
- Charleston-Atlantic
- Cherokee
- Flint River
- Florida
- Foothills
- Greater Atlanta
- New Harmony
- Northeast Georgia
- Peace River
- Providence
- St. Augustine
- Savannah
- Tampa Bay
- Trinity
- Tropical Florida

=== Synod of Southern California and Hawaii ===
- Los Ranchos
- The Pacific
- Riverside
- San Diego
- San Fernando
- San Gabriel
- Santa Barbara

=== Synod of the Southwest ===
- de Cristo
- Grand Canyon
- Santa Fe
- Sierra Blanca

=== Synod of the Sun ===
- Arkansas
- Cimarron
- Eastern Oklahoma
- Grace
- Indian Nations
- Mission
- New Covenant
- Palo Duro
- Pines
- South Louisiana
- Tres Rios

=== Synod of the Trinity ===
- Beaver-Butler
- Carlisle
- Donegal
- Huntingdon
- Kiskiminetas
- Lake Erie
- Mountain Laurel (2025 merger Lackawanna+Lehigh)
- Northumberland
- Philadelphia
- Pittsburgh
- Redstone
- Shenango
- Upper Ohio Valley
- Washington
- West Virginia
