= Old Presbyterian Meeting House =

Historic church in Virginia, US

- U.S. National Register of Historic Places
- Virginia Landmarks Register
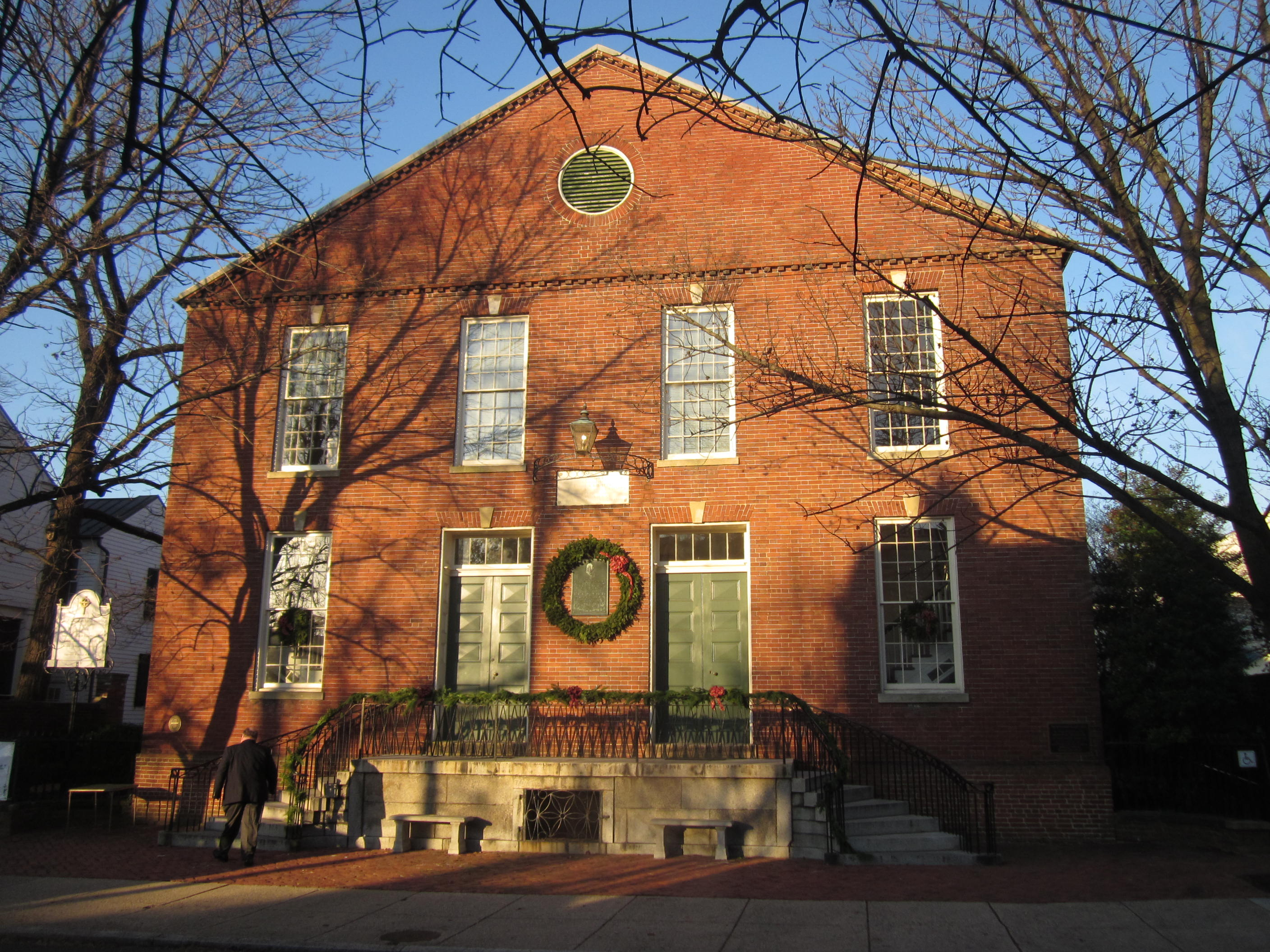
- Front facade (2011)

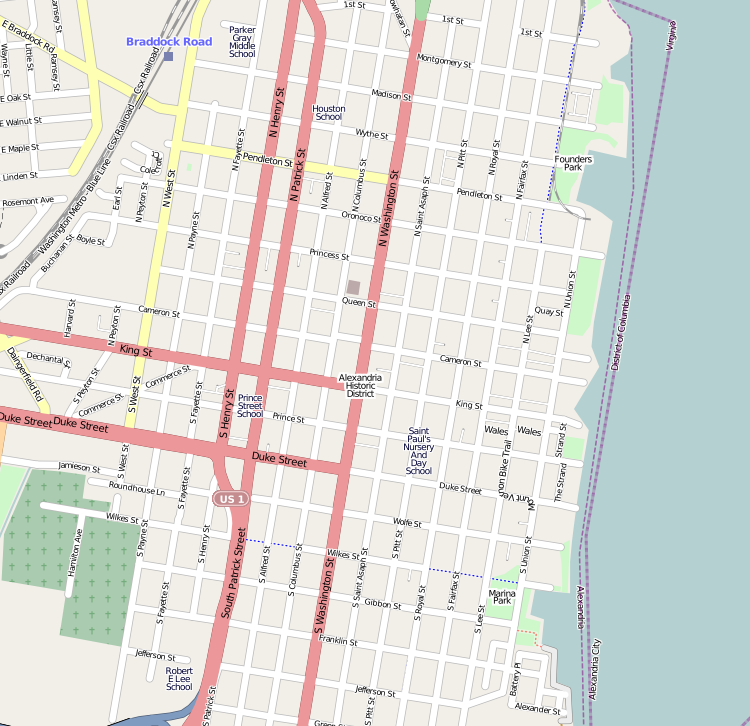
- Location within Alexandria Historical District
- Location: 321 S. Fairfax St., Alexandria, Virginia
- Coordinates: 38°48′5″N 77°2′38″W
- Area: 0.5 acres (0.20 ha)
- Built: 1775, rebuilt 1836
- Architectural style: Early Republic
- NRHP reference No.: 01000143
- VLR No.: 100-0098

Significant dates
- Added to NRHP: February 16, 2001
- Designated VLR: December 6, 2000

The Old Presbyterian Meeting House is a Christian church located at 321 South Fairfax Street in the Old Town neighborhood of Alexandria, Virginia. It is part of the National Capital Presbytery and the Synod of the Mid-Atlantic of the Presbyterian Church (USA).

The meeting house was originally built in 1775 in the Early Republic style, but was largely destroyed by fire in 1835. It was rebuilt in 1836, and a bell tower was added in 1843 and granite entrance stairs were installed in 1853. The campus was added to the National Register of Historic Places in 2001. The church also lies within the bounds of the Alexandria Historic District.

== History ==
The heritage of the Meeting House dates from the early eighteenth century. Scottish Presbyterians were among the early European settlers of Northern Virginia and were involved in establishing Alexandria as a port in 1749. The Society of Presbyterians worshiped publicly in the city from the 1760s, and the congregation's first installed minister arrived in 1772. The Meeting House was erected in 1775. Largely destroyed by fire in 1835, it was subsequently rebuilt, maintaining a Reformed Protestant plain-style appearance. Except for a bell tower added in 1843 and granite entrance stairs installed in 1853, it remains little altered to the present day.

Alexandrians have gathered at the Meeting House for public worship many times over the years. Among other such services that George Washington attended here was one conducted by the Rev. Dr. James Muir for the National Day of Solemn Humiliation, Fasting, and Prayer in 1798. Alexandria's memorial services for George Washington in 1799 were held in this sanctuary. The church bell tolled in mourning during the four days between his death and burial.

The Meeting House remained open for worship throughout the Civil War, but the congregation dwindled afterward. In 1899 the building was closed for worship, and all of the church property was entrusted to Second Presbyterian Church, which accepted responsibility for maintaining it.

For the next half-century, it served as both a museum and a place of worship. In 1949, a new congregation, taking the name of "the Old Presbyterian Meeting House," was established here.

Music has been part of the Meeting House heritage from the earliest days, and the church has served as a venue for public concerts for more than two centuries. Its first pipe organ, built by Jacob Hilbus and installed in 1817, was—according to church historian Julius Melton—the first pipe organ installed in a Presbyterian church in the United States. The Hilbus organ was destroyed in the 1835 fire. The pipe organ in the apse, by Henry Erben, dates from 1849. The pipe organ in the rear gallery was installed in 1997 by the Lively-Fulcher Organ Company.

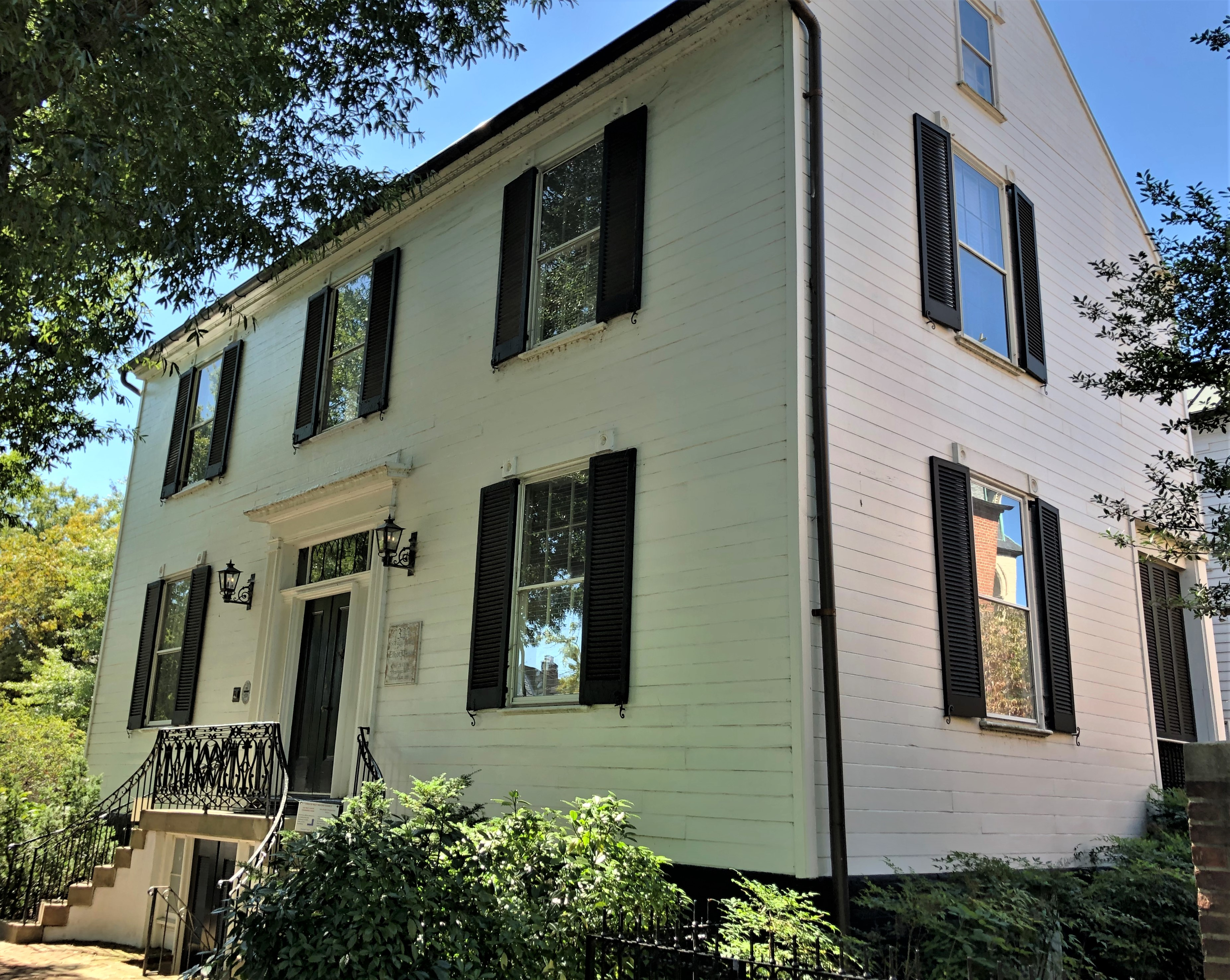
Elliot House, to the south of the Meeting House, contains the Church Offices and Heritage Hall

== Grounds ==
Adjoining the Meeting House is a Burial Ground and several buildings: Flounder House, a building with a shed roof and built in 1787, was originally a parsonage; Elliot House (1844) was originally a private residence; and the Education Building was constructed in 1957.

=== Burial Ground ===
The Burial Ground is the final resting place of many patriots of the Revolutionary War, including one unidentified soldier who is honored by the Tomb of the Unknown Soldier of the American Revolution. Among the more than 300 persons buried in this graveyard are John Carlyle, founder and first overseer of Alexandria; Dr. James Craik, Physician General of the Continental Army and close friend of George Washington; William Hunter, Jr., mayor of Alexandria and founder of the Saint Andrew's Society, and Daniel Douglass, merchant and flour inspector of the Port of Alexandria.

=== Presbyterian Cemetery ===
The Meeting House also maintains and operates the Presbyterian Cemetery on Hamilton Lane, about a mile west of the church and adjacent to Alexandria National Cemetery and other historic cemeteries. Opened in 1809, the cemetery is the final resting place of 17 patriots of the American Revolution, men killed in the War of 1812, and 62 Confederate veterans and a number of Union soldiers from the Civil War. Over the years, the Presbyterian Cemetery has provided burial space for merchants, ship captains, the Reverend Elias Harrison—the fourth pastor of the Meeting House, who died during the Civil War—a half dozen of Alexandria's mayors, numerous representatives of the city's governing council, a number of prominent businessmen and philanthropists, and at least one member of the U.S. House of Representatives.

== Congregation today ==
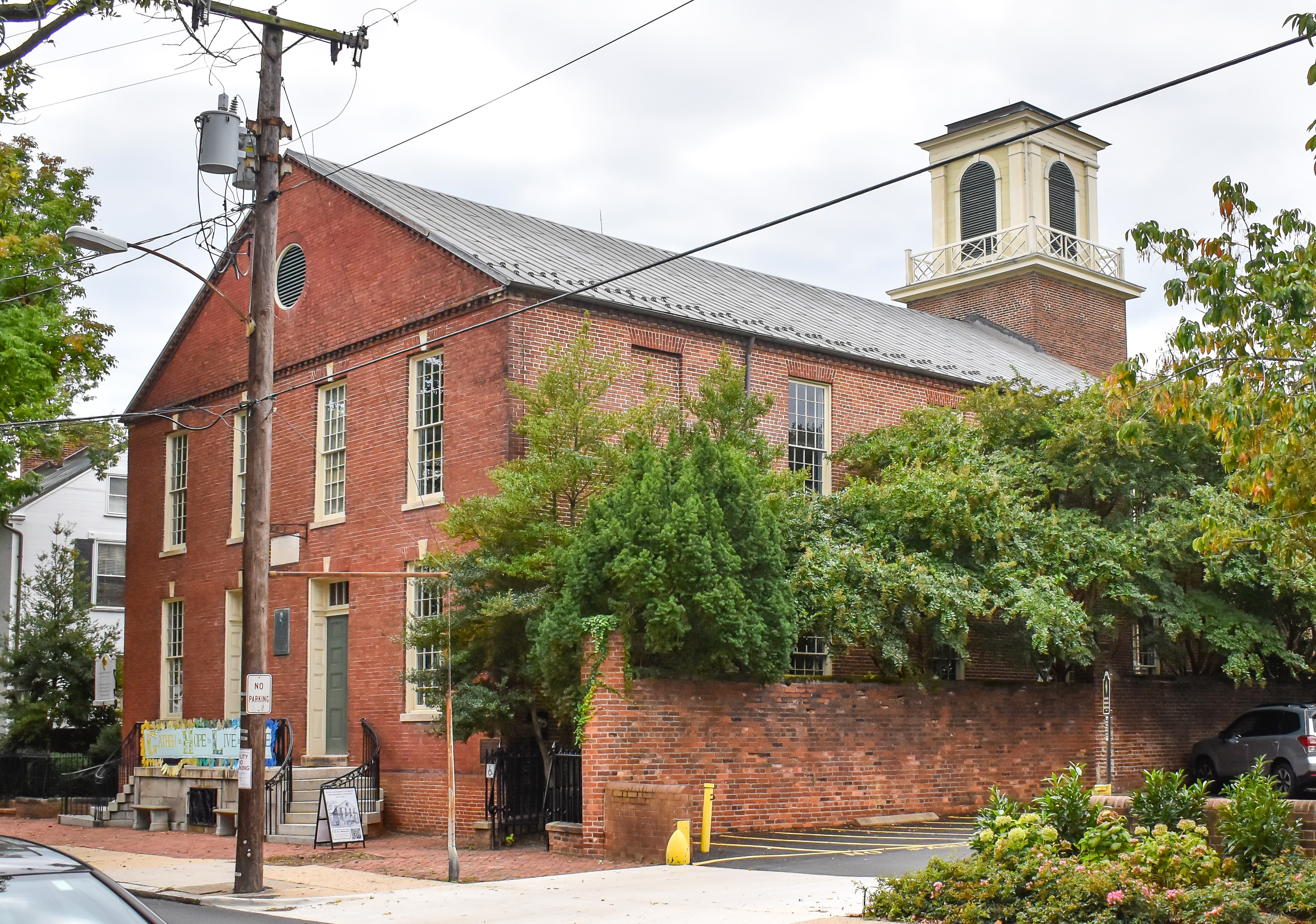
A view from the east, including the bell tower

A congregation of the Presbyterian Church (USA), the Old Presbyterian Meeting House today is led by the Reverend Dr. Shelly Wood, Pastor and Head of Staff; the Reverend Dr. Katherine A. Stanford, Associate Pastor; the Reverend Ann Herlin Staley, Associate Pastor; and a Session (governing body) of 26 ruling elders. The church has a congregation of more than 1,000 members. It defines itself as "an inclusive, justice-seeking congregation," and supports a variety of programs and ministries for people of all ages, from pre-school age through teenagers and working adults to older adults in retirement homes.

Music plays an important role in worship and broader aspects of life at the Meeting House. Worship services feature both the Lively-Fulcher pipe organ and the choir, which includes both professional and volunteer members. Special services may also feature the Erben organ, brass ensembles, the children's choirs, or other vocal or instrumental groups. "Concerts With A Cause," held periodically throughout the year, feature talented local artists, and a free-will offering collected at intermission benefits a designated local charity. During the Advent season, a half-hour program of "Noonday Noels," held on Wednesdays at noon, provides a brief musical offering and scripture reading.

Through the Presbyterian Church, the Meeting House maintains an active local, national, and worldwide mission and outreach program. Among other needs, it provides support each year for the Alexandria Tutoring Consortium, the Family to Family emergency financial assistance program, and Alive! (Alexandrians Involved Ecumenically). The congregation also has active mission partnerships in Islamabad, Pakistan; Pignon, Haiti; and Kenya. The congregation is actively involved in social justice advocacy on issues such as affordable housing and improved health services through the interdenominational Virginians Organized for Interfaith Community Engagement (VOICE).

Among the several buildings adjoining the Meeting House, Flounder House now provides classrooms, meeting space, the church archives, and space for a local non-profit; the Elliot House now houses the church offices; and the Education Building includes classrooms, a large meeting room, and the Meeting House Cooperative Preschool.

While the burial ground on the church property is no longer active, the well-kept Presbyterian Cemetery, which has been in continuous use for more than two centuries, continues to function as an active cemetery. In 2008, the Cemetery opened a columbarium to accommodate the interment of cremated remains.

== See also ==
- National Register of Historic Places listings in Alexandria, Virginia
