= First Presbyterian Church (Arlington, Virginia) =

Church in Virginia, US

Coordinates: 38.8774°N 77.1131°W

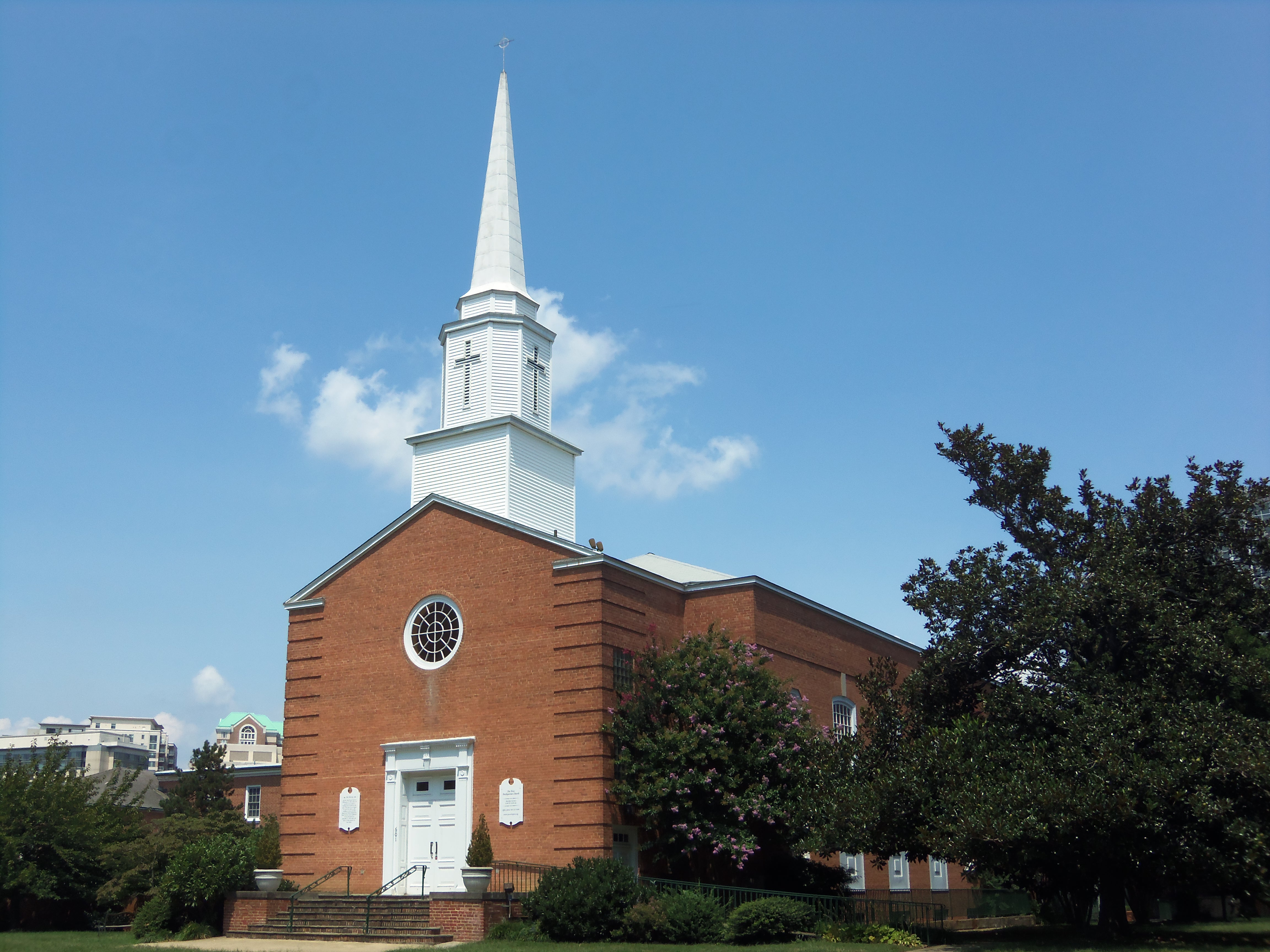
First Presbyterian Church, Arlington, Virginia, USA

First Presbyterian Church of Arlington, Virginia, United States, is a congregation in the National Capital Presbytery, the Synod of Mid-Atlantic and the Presbyterian Church (USA).

== History ==
Church member Cynthia Bolbach was the Moderator of the 219th General Assembly of the Presbyterian Church (USA).

The church formed on February 22, 1872. The Church was located at what was the corner of Wilson Boulevard and Glebe Road in Arlington up until December 9, 1951, when the congregation moved to the new, and present site about two blocks away, at the corner of Vermont Street and Carlin Springs Road.

== Present ==
The current Pastor is the Reverend Dr. Bryan Mickle. Address: 601 North Vermont Street, Arlington, VA 22203

== See also ==
First Presbyterian Church, Arlington, Virginia, USA
