= Central Presbyterian Church (Austin, Texas) =

Historic church in Texas, United States

Coordinates: 30.269685°N 97.740280°W

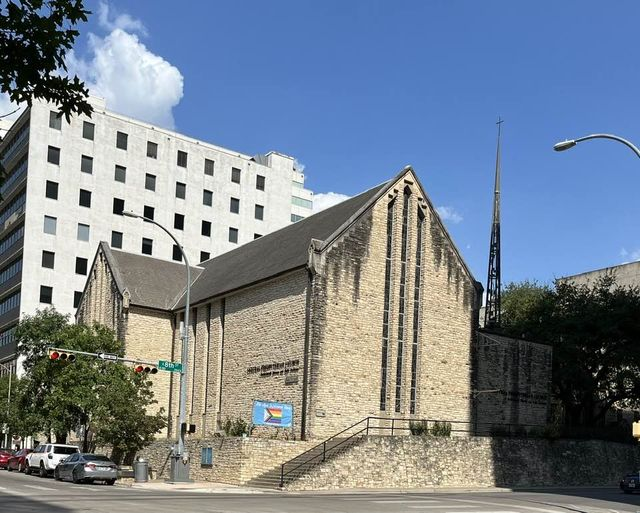
Central Presbyterian Church, Austin, Texas, US

Located on the northeast corner of Brazos and Eighth Street, Central Presbyterian Church in Austin, Texas. Central Presbyterian Church is a member of Mission Presbytery, in the Synod of the Sun region of the Presbyterian Church (USA).

It maintains a program of ministry, outreach, and cultural events. It has presented free concerts weekly since 1980, and since 2006 the church has been a venue for the SXSW Music Festival.

== History ==
The congregation traces its roots to October 13, 1839, when Austin's first Presbyterian worship service was held at Bullock's hotel. The City of Austin was chartered two and a half months later, December 27, 1839. Present at that service was builder Abner Cook, elder in the first Presbyterian church organized in Austin. He helped acquire the property at the northeast corner of Brazos and Bois d'Arc (now Eighth Street) for the Presbyterian Church (South) following a post-Civil War split in the church. A sanctuary was completed on the site in 1874; the current sanctuary was built in 1957. It was recognized by the Texas Historical Commission in 1989 as an historical site.

The congregation was known in later years as Southern Presbyterian Church, the Free Presbyterian Church, First Southern Presbyterian Church, and (currently) Central Presbyterian Church. It has counted among its members many individuals important in the life of the denomination and the city of Austin, including Gov. Francis R. Lubbock; William Sidney Porter (O. Henry); A. N. and Jane Y. McCallum; Dr. George Clark and Rebecca Kilgore Stuart Red; and U. S. Attorney General Thomas Watt Gregory. The Rev. Richmond Kelley Smoot, pastor from 1876 to 1905, played an important role in the national denomination and in the development of the Austin Presbyterian Theological Seminary. The congregation has been instrumental in organizing five Presbyterian churches in Austin.

First identified as Presbyterian Church (South), the congregation has been known subsequently as Austin Presbyterian Church, Southern Presbyterian Church, Free Presbyterian Church (i.e. its pews were not for sale to families) and First Southern Presbyterian Church. In 1983, with national reunification of the Northern and Southern branches of the denomination into the Presbyterian Church (USA), the church changed its name to Central Presbyterian Church.
