= Presbytery of Boston =

Religious association

Location
- Country: United States
- Territory: Boston; Worcester County; Norfolk County; Suffolk County; parts of Essex County
- Ecclesiastical province: Synod of the Northeast
- Headquarters: Clinton, Massachusetts

Statistics
- Churches: 20 Chartered Churches
- Congregations: 6 New Worshiping Communities
- Members: 1,757 (2022)

Information
- Denomination: Presbyterian Church (USA)
- Established: 16 April 1745

Website
- www.presbyteryofboston.org

The Presbytery of Boston is the regional governing body for congregations located in the Greater Boston area affiliated with the Presbyterian Church (USA). Established in 1745 and with an office in Clinton, Massachusetts, the Presbytery of Boston currently includes 20 member churches located in Worcester, Norfolk, and Suffolk counties, and parts of Essex County. The Presbytery of Boston is one of 19 presbyteries that comprise the Synod of the Northeast, which oversees churches in New Jersey, New York, and the New England states.

== History ==
In the mid-18th century, the Presbytery of Londonderry was the sole presbytery in New England. On 16 April 1745, the Presbytery of Boston was established by three local ministers. In 1748, the Rev. Jonathan Parsons, minister of Salem Presbyterian Church, joined the presbytery. By 1768, the presbytery had 12 ministers.

== Member churches ==
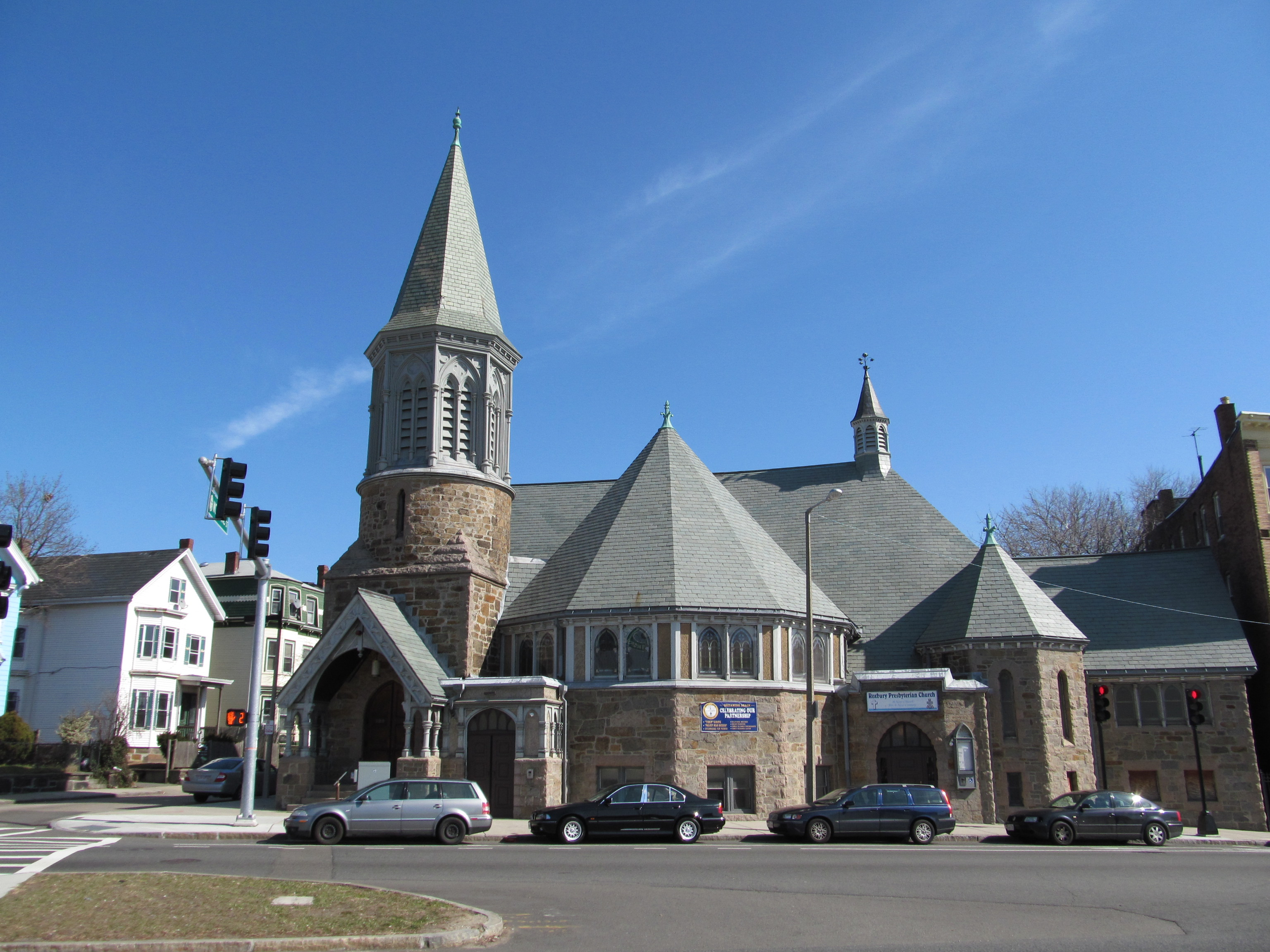
Roxbury Presbyterian Church in Roxbury, Massachusetts.

There are 20 chartered congregations and 6 new worshiping communities in the Presbytery of Boston.

Beverly

- Pilgrim Church
- Gateway Church

Boston

- Church of the Covenant, Downtown Boston
- Fourth Presbyterian Church, South Boston
- Hyde Park Presbyterian Church, Hyde Park
- Primera Iglesia Presbiteriana Hispana de Boston, Jamaica Plain
- Roxbury Presbyterian Church, Roxbury

Brockton

- Shekinah Presbyterian Church in Brockton

Brookline

- First Presbyterian Church
- Korean Church of Boston

Burlington

- Burlington Presbyterian Church

Cambridge

- First United Presbyterian Church

Clinton

- Clinton Presbyterian Church

Easton

- Good Shepherd Presbyterian Church

Natick

- Hartford Street Presbyterian Church
- Shekinah Presbyterian Church in Natick

Needham

- Needham Presbyterian Church

Newton

- Newton Presbyterian Church
- Taiwan Presbyterian Church of Greater Boston

Norwood

- Shekinah Presbyterian Church in Norwood

Quincy

- First Presbyterian Church
- Quincy Young Sang Presbyterian Church

Somerville

- Clarendon Hill Presbyterian Church

Sudbury

- Sudbury Presbyterian Church

Waltham

- First Presbyterian Church

Whitinsville

- United Presbyterian Church of Whitinsville

Worcester

- First Presbyterian Church
- Christaller Presbyterian Fellowship

=== Former churches ===
- Federal Street Church, Downtown Boston (became Congregationalist in 1786)
- First Presbyterian Church, Boston (founded 1853, now closed)
- First Presbyterian Church, East Boston (founded 1853, closed 1996)
- First United Presbyterian Church, Boston (founded 1846, now closed)
- Fort Square Presbyterian Church, Quincy (joined the Covenant Order of Evangelical Presbyterians (ECO) in 2016)
- Hanover Street Church, Boston
- Second Presbyterian Church, Boston
- Third Presbyterian Church, Boston (founded 1870, now closed)

== Notable clergy ==
- Lyman Beecher (1775-1863) was pastor at Hanover Street Church in Boston from 1826 to 1833
- Jonathan Parsons (1705-1776) was pastor of the Presbyterian church in Newburyport and a supporter of the American Revolution (at the time Newburyport was part of the Presbytery of Boston)

== See also ==
- Presbytery of Northern New England
