= Bedford Presbyterian Church =

Historic church in New Hampshire, United States

- U.S. National Register of Historic Places
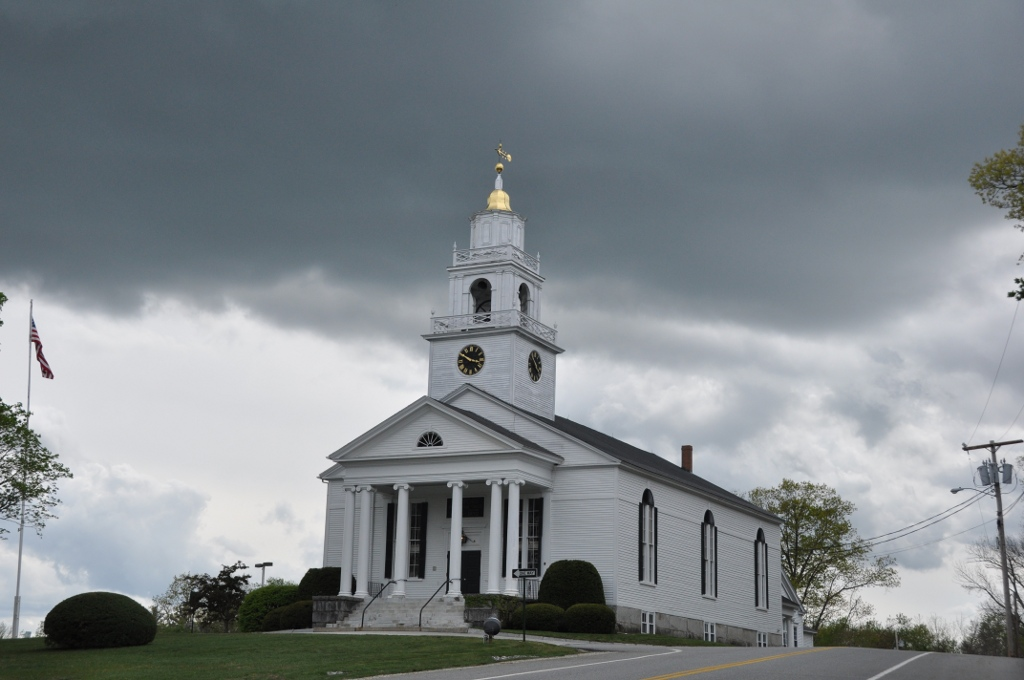

- Location within New Hampshire Location within the United States
- Location: 4 Church Rd., Bedford, New Hampshire
- Coordinates: 42°56′42″N 71°31′12″W
- Area: 3.7 acres (1.5 ha)
- Built: 1832
- Architect: Longfellow, Alexander Wadsworth; Kennedy, Thomas
- Architectural style: Federal, Colonial Revival
- NRHP reference No.: 07000554
- Added to NRHP: June 12, 2007

The Bedford Presbyterian Church is a historic Presbyterian church building at 4 Church Road in Bedford, New Hampshire. The white clapboard structure was built in 1832 for a congregation organized in 1749 and was for many years the town's only church. The building was listed on the National Register of Historic Places in 2007. It is the oldest Presbyterian church building in the state and in the Presbytery of Northern New England.

== Architecture and history ==
Bedford Presbyterian Church is on the western edge of Bedford's dispersed village center, on the south side of Church Road just west of its junction with Bedford Center Road. It is set on a rise, from which it overlooks the rest of the center. It is a 1 1/2-story wood-frame structure with a gabled roof and clapboarded exterior. It has a three-stage tower: the first stage is square, with clock faces on each side, the second is an open belfry with arched openings, and the third is an octagonal drum with paneled pilasters, which is topped by a gilt cushion and weather vane. The main facade is fronted by a six-column Ionic portico, the columns supporting an entablature and pedimented gable with half-round window at the center. The interior of the church still has most of its original box pews, some having been removed in 1885 to make room for an organ and choir. A modern church hall wing joins the building to an 1880s vestry house.

Bedford was settled in the 1730s, by predominantly Presbyterian Scottish and Irish immigrants. As a result, the Presbyterian Church became the town's established religion, unlike many New England communities, which were usually settled by Congregationalists. Although Bedford was not the first Presbyterian congregation in New England (Londonderry's is older by a few years), this church is the oldest Presbyterian church building in the region. The front portico was added in 1896.

== See also ==
- National Register of Historic Places listings in Hillsborough County, New Hampshire
