= First Presbyterian Church (Schenectady, New York) =

- First Presbyterian Church of Schenectady
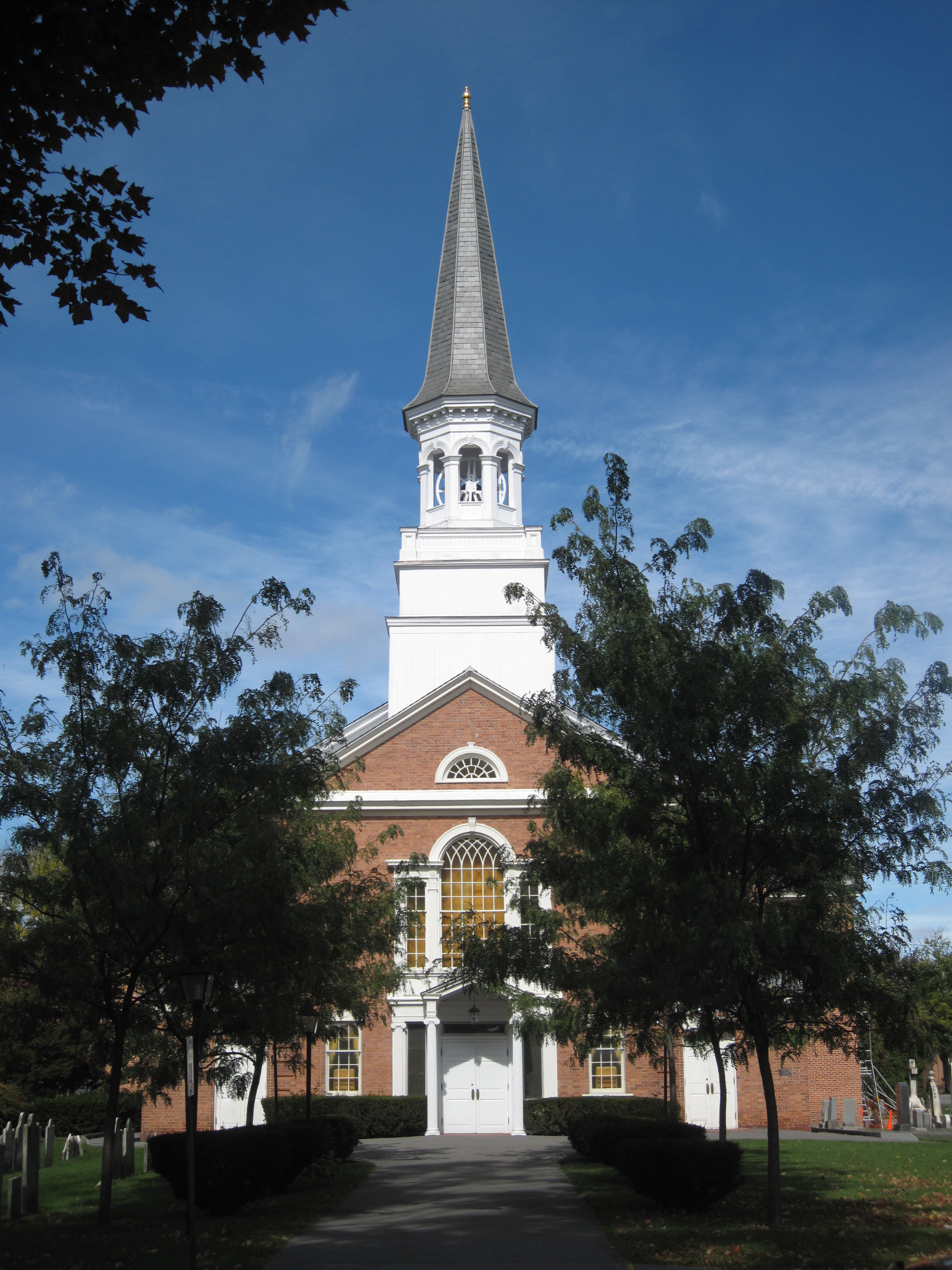

- Location within New York
- 42°49′02.6″N 73°56′41.2″W
- Location: 209 Union Street, Schenectady, New York
- Country: United States
- Denomination: Presbyterian Church in America
- Previous denomination: UPCUSA
- Churchmanship: Evangelical, Reformed
- Website: fpcschdy.org

History
- Founded: 1730s

Architecture
- Completed: 1809

First Presbyterian Church in Schenectady, New York is a historic Presbyterian Church in America congregation.

The roots of the congregation go back to the 1730s. Episcopalians and Presbyterians had used the St. George's Episcopal Church building, with each group using different entrances to the building. In 1769, First Presbyterian was founded when its members decided to build their own wooden church structure. The first settled pastor was the Rev. Alexander Miller in 1771. The present church building was copied from the Ransom Court Presbyterian Church in Philadelphia, Pennsylvania under Rev. Alexander Monteith's pastorate (1809-1815). First Presbyterian Church was distinguished by a wrap-around balcony of the oval interior. The original church had white walls and blue woodwork. Additions were made in 1834, and transepts were added in 1859. The congregation helped start several other churches in the neighborhood, including State Street Presbyterian Church in 1869. In 1900, Union Presbyterian church was established in Schenectady with 81 members. The renowned Rev. Jonathan Trumbull Backus, for many years a trustee of Union College, pastored First Presbyterian from 1832 to 1872. Under his leadership the congregation grew significantly and established East Avenue (now State Street) Presbyterian Church. Rev. Backus was elected moderator of the Presbyterian Church in the United States of America in 1870.

As the 1900s dawned, First Presbyterian was involved in much outreach and growth. However, the winds of change were blowing, and new mentalities began to seep into the church. Spiritual zeal cooled during the pastorates of Reverends Anthony and Mutch. The Sunday evening service was discontinued and a certain spiritual apathy settled over the church. The liberal 'social gospel' rampant in the early 20th century had infected First Presbyterian's pulpit and had led to a serious departure from the essentials of the Gospel.

All this began to change in 1937. In that year, the Rev. Herbert S. Mekeel (minister from 1937 to 1979) was called to the church, and like Dr. Backus a century earlier, started it on the road to spiritual vitality once again. This did not occur without the pain of change and transition. Rev. Herbert S. Mekeel pastored the church to 1937 to 1979, and brought with him strong evangelical teaching. Many members became dissatisfied and, in the first years of his pastorate, went over to the liberal First Reformed Church (RCA). But Rev. Mekeel held his ground, and the remaining congregation grew even larger and stronger than before.

In the 1960s, however, theological change once again began to sweep through the United Presbyterian Church in the United States of America, the denomination of which First Presbyterian had been a member. The UPC adopted the Confession of 1967, which was effectively intended by its supporters to replace the Westminster Standards in the denomination and their high view of the authority of Holy Scripture. First Presbyterian opposed replacing the historic Westminster Confession with other confessions. In 1975, the congregation decided to petition the Presbytery of Albany to let First Presbyterian to change the denominational affiliation. In 1977, the congregation voted to dissolve all relations with Albany Presbytery. This led to much legal wrangling over the church property. A state law provision concerning churches incorporated before 1828 (First Presbyterian Church was incorporated in 1809) allowed such churches the right to change affiliation without impact on their property. Albany Presbytery forcefully sought to bring the congregation to heel, including through an unsuccessful effort to lock officers and members of First Presbyterian out of the church's buildings. A lawsuit made its way through the U.S. courts, going so far as to reach the U.S. Supreme Court. The case was finally settled in December 1984, in favor of the members and officers of First Presbyterian.

In September 1989, First Presbyterian affiliated with the Presbyterian Church in America. In 2010, the church celebrated its 250th anniversary. The current senior pastor is Dr. Mark Dunn.

In 2011, First Presbyterian Church had about 400 members.

The church building is located at 209 Union Street, Schenectady, NY 12305.

== Pastors ==
- Rev. Alexander Miller, 1770-1781
- Rev. John Young, 1787-1791
- Rev. John Blair Smith, D.D., 1795, etc.
- Rev. Robt. Smith, 1796-1801
- Rev. Wm. Clarkson, 1801-1803
- Rev. John B. Romeyn, D.D., 1803-1804
- Rev. Nathaniel Todd, 1805-1806
- Rev. Alexander Monteith, 1809-1815
- Rev. Hooper Cummings, 1815-1817
- Rev. Drs. Nott & McAuley, 1817-1820
- Rev. Walter Monteith, 1820-1826
- Rev. Erskine Mason, D.D., 1827-1830
- Rev. Wm. James, D.D., 1831-1832
- Rev. Jonathan Trumbull Backus, D.D., LL. D., 1832-1873
- Rev. Timothy G. Darling, D.D., 1873-.
