= Daniel Douglass =

American politician (1768–1803)

Daniel Douglass (1768 – 1803) was a politician and businessperson in Alexandria, Virginia.

== Life ==
Douglass worked as a merchant and was a prominent lender in Alexandria. Beginning in the mid-1790s, he was appointed to the office of Flour Inspector of the Port of Alexandria by the Fairfax County Court, a position he held for several terms. During his tenure, the Port of Alexandria was one of the most active commercial ports and flour exporters in the United States. He was referenced on multiple occasions in the letters of President George Washington. Douglass had at least one son named John. Personal secretary to President Washington, Tobias Lear, referred to Douglass as possessing "punctuality and having the command of money."

Douglass owned several enslaved persons during his adult life. Douglass freed at least one enslaved person through manumission in 1800, and two additional enslaved persons were freed in 1823, twenty years after Douglass' death.

== Death ==
Douglass died in 1803, aged 34 or 35. He was an elder in the Presbyterian Church and is buried at the Old Presbyterian Meeting House.
