= Presbytery of Detroit =

Presbyterian church in Michigan

The Presbytery of Detroit is one of the Presbyterian Church (U.S.A.) Presbyteries within the Synod of the Covenant. It consists of 72 congregations in Southeast Michigan.
