= Tomb of the Unknown Soldier of the American Revolution =

Memorial in Alexandria, Virginia

The Tomb of the Unknown Soldier of the American Revolution honors an unidentified soldier of the American Revolutionary War, whose remains were unearthed in 1826 in Alexandria, Virginia. The memorial is in the churchyard Burial Ground of the Old Presbyterian Meeting House, a congregation of the Presbyterian Church that dates from 1772. The Meeting House is located at 323 South Fairfax Street, in Alexandria's Old Town National Historic Landmark District.

== Creation of the memorial ==
In 1826, during construction of St. Mary's Roman Catholic Church, which is located immediately next to the churchyard of the Old Presbyterian Meeting House, the body of an unidentified man, clothed in a Revolutionary War uniform, was unearthed. The body was then reinterred within the current bounds of the Meeting House Burial Ground. The memory that the remains of an unidentified soldier had been reburied at this site was carried into the twentieth century by Mary Gregory Powell (1847–1928), a member of the Meeting House congregation and long-time historian of the Mount Vernon chapter of the Daughters of the American Revolution. Her father, William Gregory (1789–1875), had come to Alexandria from Scotland in 1807 and had served the Presbyterian Meeting House congregation for many years as an Elder and member of the Church Committee. Mary Gregory had placed flowers on the unmarked grave of the unidentified soldier as a child.

Several events during the 1920s influenced the creation of this memorial to an Unknown of the American Revolution. One was the memorialization of soldiers who had died in World War I and remained unidentified. On the second anniversary of the signing of the treaty that ended World War I, Armistice Day 1920, memorials to unknown soldiers were dedicated in Great Britain and France. The United States dedicated its memorial to an unknown soldier of that war at Arlington National Cemetery on November 11, 1921. The sarcophagus-style monument that now sits atop the burial vault of the Tomb of the Unknowns was added in 1932.

The 1920s also witnessed a surge of interest in honoring and preserving the nation's colonial heritage. Alexandria's earliest Colonial revival preservation effort was the restoration of the Presbyterian Meeting House, which began in 1925. As that project drew to its completion, Mary Gregory Powell contacted John B. Gordon, chair of the Meeting House restoration committee, about honoring the Unknown Soldier. The decision was made to formally mark the gravesite. Leadership in that task was provided by Alexandria's American Legion Post No. 24.

On February 22, 1928, a temporary marker was placed at the gravesite in conjunction with Alexandria's annual celebration of George Washington's birthday. Dedication services held that day followed traditions in Alexandria that date from its colonial period – participants initially gathered at Gadsby's Tavern and then joined in a processional walk through the city's streets to the Meeting House, where the service was conducted. Mary Gregory Powell dedicated the initial wooden temporary marker.

== Dedication of the memorial ==
The current memorial was created by the National Society of the Children of the American Revolution under the leadership of Mrs. Josiah A. Van Orsdel, the Society's president. The memorial was dedicated on Lexington–Concord Day, April 19, 1929, with services in the Presbyterian Meeting House and at the site of the memorial in the churchyard Burial Ground. The service in the Meeting House was led by Mrs. Van Orsdel and included two addresses – "Story of the Discovery of the Grave," by John B. Gordon, chair of the Meeting House restoration committee, and "157,000 American Unknown War Dead Here and Abroad," by James W. Good, U.S. Secretary of War. William Tyler Page, Clerk of the United States House of Representatives and author of "The American's Creed," read the "Epitaph of the Unknown Soldier," which he had prepared for the tabletop memorial. Music was provided by the U.S. Army Band, which joined with the church's historic 1849 Erben organ to lead the singing of the Star Spangled Banner. Following the service inside the Meeting House, the assemblage moved to the gravesite, accompanied by the solemn tolling of the church bell, where numerous wreaths were placed at the foot of the memorial by patriotic and military organizations. The 90-minute program was broadcast live national audience by Washington's local radio station, WRC.

== Epitaph ==
Here lies a soldier of the Revolution whose identity is known but to God. His was an idealism that recognized a Supreme Being, that planted religious liberty on our shores, that overthrew despotism, that established a people's government, that wrote a Constitution setting metes and bounds of delegated authority, that fixed a standard of value upon men above gold and lifted high the torch of civil liberty along the pathway of mankind. In ourselves his soul exists as part of ours, his memory's mansion.

== The memorial today ==
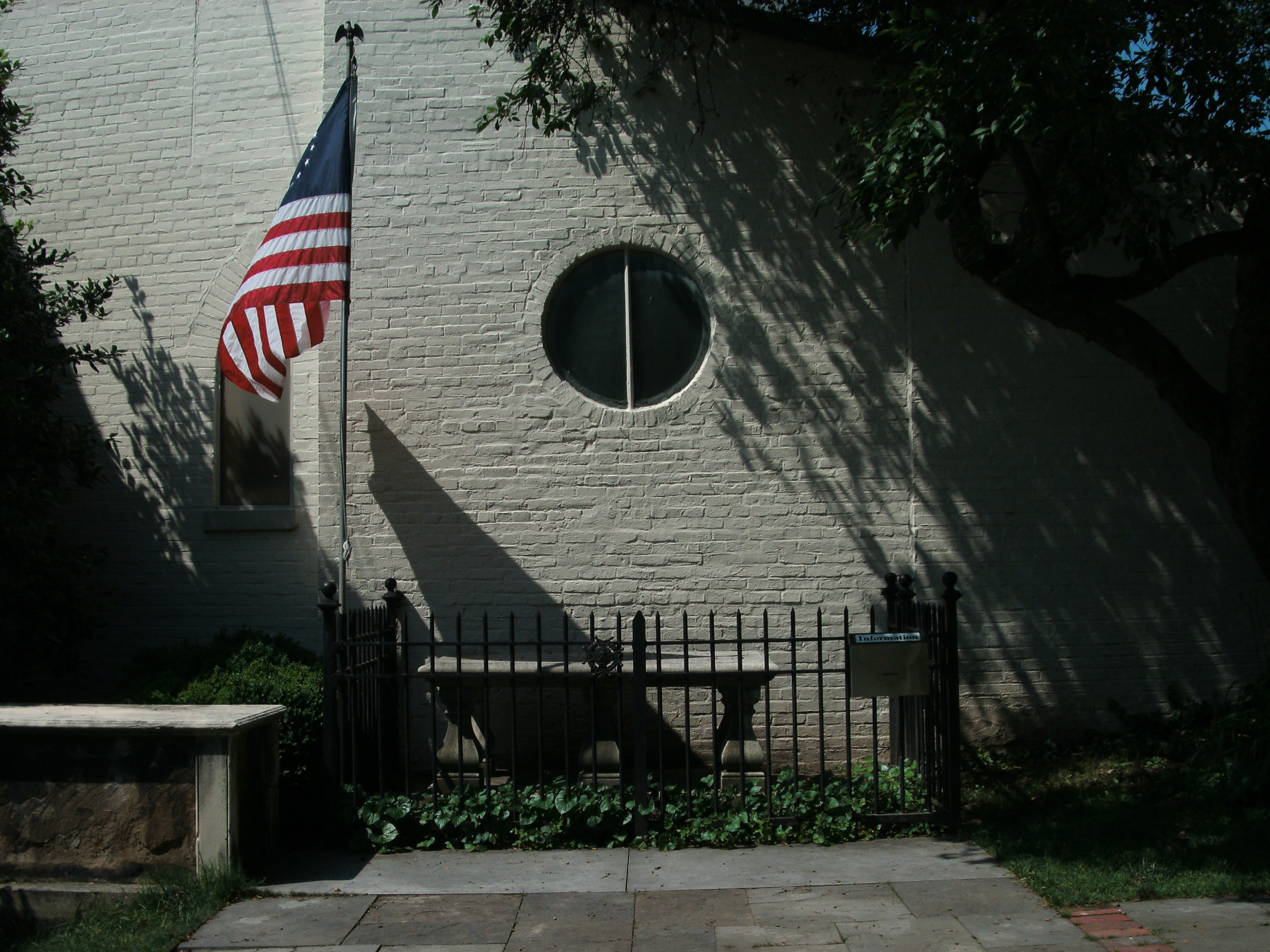

Alexandria's Tomb of the Unknown Soldier of the American Revolution continues to be honored regularly by visitors and with ceremonial services conducted by the Children of the American Revolution, Daughters of the American Revolution, Sons of the American Revolution, Society of the Cincinnati, First Virginia Regiment of the Continental Line, Veterans of Foreign Wars, American Legion, Legion of Honor of Shriners International, National Sojourners of Freemasonry, and other groups.

== Other memorials to Unknown Soldiers of the American Revolution ==
There are three other unidentified soldiers of the American Revolution who are similarly honored. One is honored with the Tomb of the Unknown Revolutionary War Soldier, located in Washington Square, Philadelphia, Pennsylvania, created in 1957. The second is honored with the Unknown Patriot Soldier of the American Revolution, located near Jamestown, Virginia, created in 2016.

The third is the Tomb of the Unknown Patriot of the American Revolution, paying homage to an unknown soldier of the fort, located south of Akron/Canton, in Bolivar OH, at Fort Laurens, the only Revolutionary War fort in Ohio.
