= Synod of the Pacific =

Synod of the Pacific is an upper judicatory of the Presbyterian Church (USA) including northern and central California, Oregon, Nevada, southern Idaho, and part of Washington state.

The Synod contains 9 presbyteries, 347 churches, 20 new church developments, and 41,710 members (2022).

See "Map of Presbyteries and Synods (2012)".
