= Liz Walker (journalist) =

American journalist

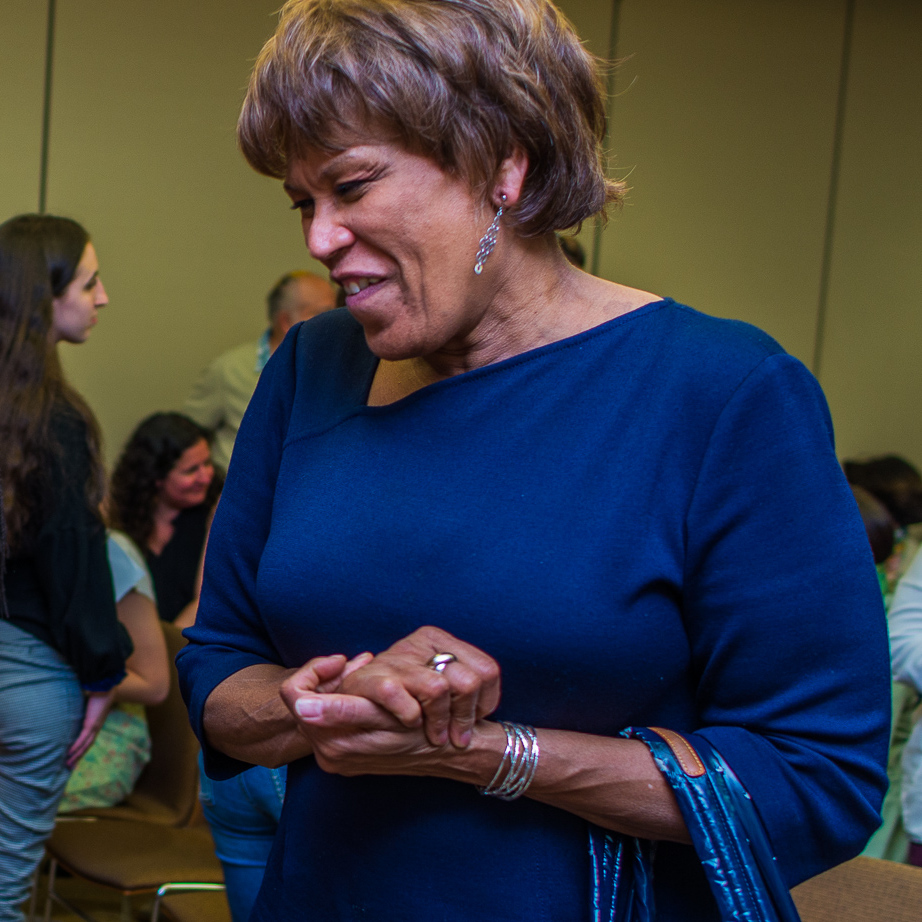
Rev. Walker in 2018

Liz Walker is an American pastor and retired journalist. She was the first black woman to co-anchor a newscast in Boston, Massachusetts, United States. She became the Pastor of the Roxbury Presbyterian Church in 2014.

== Education ==
Elizabeth received her high school diploma from Little Rock Central High School class of 1969. She credited her education there as the foundation of her successes. Her Bachelor of Arts degree in communications was earned at Olivet College in Michigan. In 2005 she graduated from Harvard Divinity School with a master's degree focusing on religion and women's issues. She is a member of the National Association of Black Journalists, Sigma Delta Chi and American Women in Radio and Television.

== Career as journalist ==
Walker was the evening news anchor at WBZ-TV starting in 1981. Her career had begun in her hometown of Little Rock, Arkansas working as the public affairs director at station KATV. On-air assignments in Denver (KMGH-TV) and San Francisco (KRON-TV) followed before she moved to Boston and WBZ in 1980. In 1987, she was reportedly making $500,000 a year ($1.375 million in April, 2024). In that year her planned pregnancy was publicly announced. This caused some criticism as some local religious leaders felt that she was both unmarried and unashamed made her a poor role model for teenagers.

After doing a story on the Lost Boys of Sudan, she began to re-evaluate her life. Ultimately, this led to her enrolling at the Harvard Divinity School in September 2001.

In January 2002, she produced an independent documentary on Sudan entitled In the Lion's Mouth."

== Pastor ==
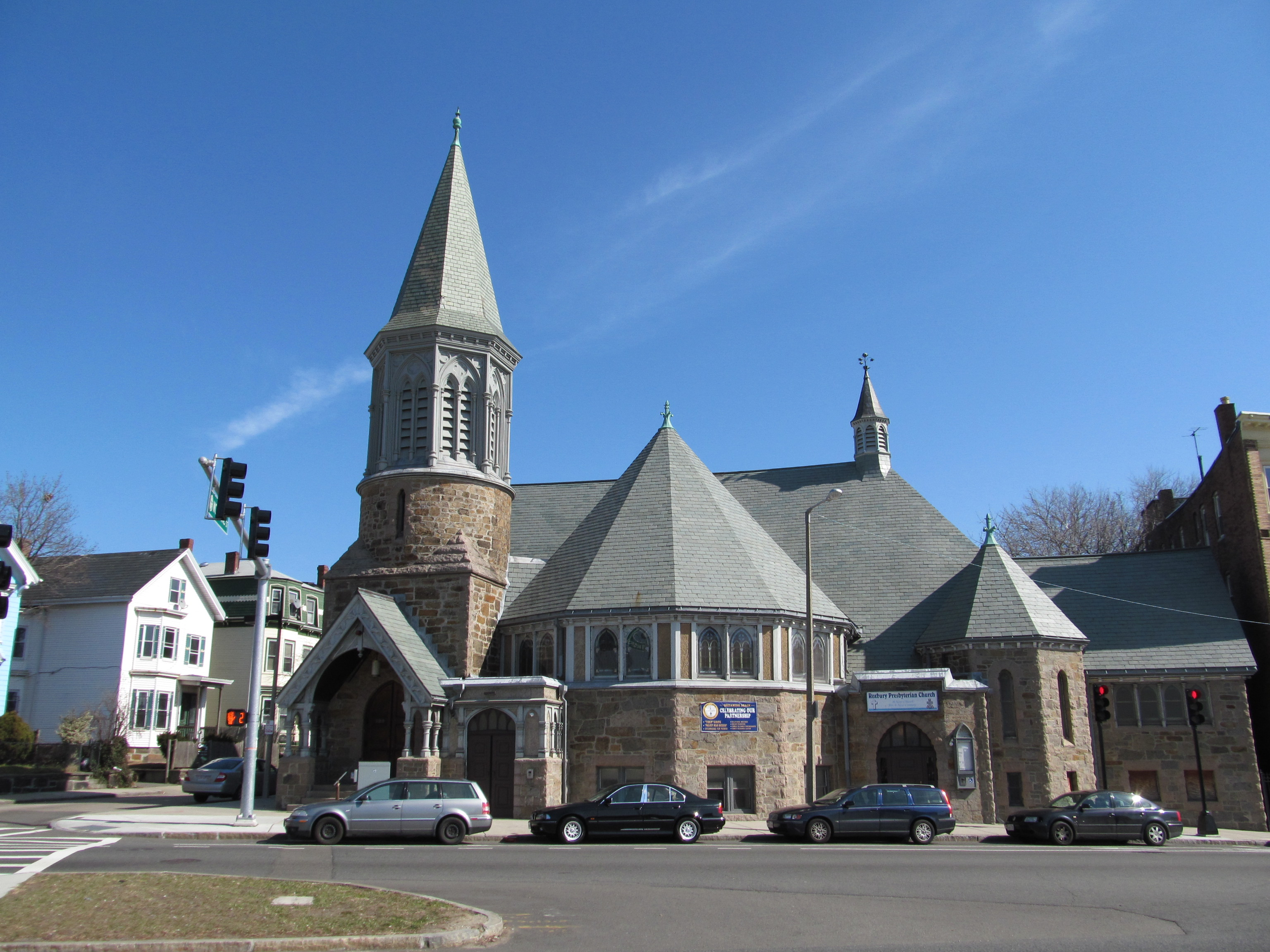
Her church from 2014

Walker became the Pastor of the Roxbury Presbyterian Church in May 2014. She had served as "transitional leader" since 2011. On December 25, 2021, The Boston Globe reported that Liz Walker left her position as minister of the Roxbury Presbyterian Church.

== Awards and honors ==
Walker has been inducted into the Massachusetts Broadcasters Hall of Fame. She has won two Emmy Awards. In 2001, the Crittenton Women's Union gave her the Amelia Earhart Award.

Her coverage of Sudan led to an Edward R. Murrow Award for a News Story by the Regional Television Radio News Director's Association in 2002.

== Personal life ==
Walker has a son, actor Nik Walker. She is originally from Little Rock, Arkansas and the daughter of a minister.
