= Winnebago Presbytery =

- Classification: Protestant
- Orientation: Mainline Reformed
- Theology: Combination of Old School and New School Presbyterianism with Confessing Movement, neo-orthodox, Low Church, Barthian, ecumenical, neo-evangelical, progressive, Christian left, Christian feminism, and some moderate to liberal influences
- Polity: Presbyterian
- Associations: Synod of Lakes and Prairies
- Region: North Central/Northeastern Wisconsin
- Headquarters: 181 E. North Water Street, Ste 207, Neenah, WI 54956
- Congregations: 28
- Official website: winnebagopresbytery.org

The Winnebago Presbytery is a district governing body of the Presbyterian Church (USA) (PCUSA). It is one of the 16 Presbyteries of the Synod of Lakes and Prairies. It consists of 28 congregations located primarily in North Central and Northeastern Wisconsin.
