= Synod of the Sun =

The Synod of the Sun is a higher governing body of the Presbyterian Church (USA) in the states of Texas, Louisiana, Arkansas and Oklahoma.

It has 11 presbyteries, 687 congregations and 86,580 members (2022).

The Synod is headquartered in the Dallas-Fort Worth Metroplex suburb of Irving, Texas.

== See also ==
- Christianity in Houston
