= Synod of Lakes and Prairies =

- Classification: Protestant
- Orientation: Mainline Reformed
- Theology: Combination of Old School and New School Presbyterianism with Confessing Movement, neo-orthodox, Low Church, Barthian, ecumenical, neo-evangelical, progressive, Christian left, Christian feminism, and some moderate to liberal influences
- Polity: Presbyterian
- Moderator: Elona Street-Stewart
- Region: Iowa, Minnesota, Nebraska, North Dakota, South Dakota, and Wisconsin
- Headquarters: 2115 Cliff Dr., Eagan, MN 55122-3327
- Congregations: 736 (2022)
- Members: 80,401 (2022)
- Official website: www.lakesandprairies.org

The Synod of Lakes and Prairies is a regional governing body of the Presbyterian Church (U.S.A.) (or PC(USA)). It consists of presbyteries located in Iowa, Minnesota, Nebraska, North Dakota, South Dakota, and Wisconsin, and one non-geographic presbytery. There are 16 presbyteries in the synod.
