= Roxbury Presbyterian Church =

Historic church in Massachusetts, United States

- U.S. National Register of Historic Places
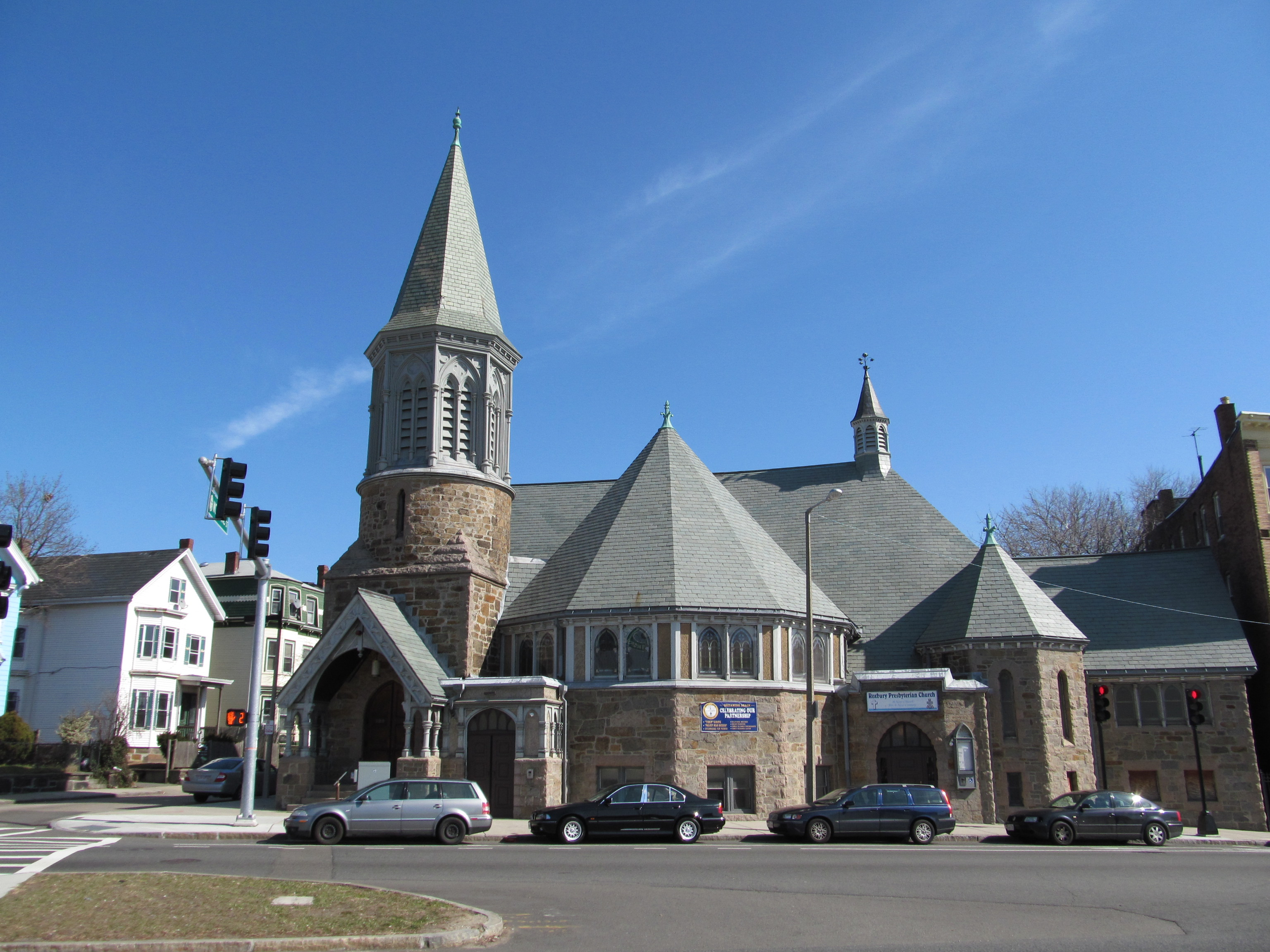
- Roxbury Presbyterian Church

- Location within Massachusetts Location within the United States
- Location: Boston, Massachusetts
- Coordinates: 42°19′10″N 71°4′55″W
- Built: 1891
- Architect: Spofford, John C.; Swanson, William
- Architectural style: Gothic, Queen Anne
- NRHP reference No.: 89002125
- Added to NRHP: March 15, 1991

Roxbury Presbyterian Church is a historic Presbyterian church at 328 Warren Street in Boston, Massachusetts, United States. The Gothic church building was designed by John C. Spofford and built in 1891 for a congregation organized in 1881. Built of Roxbury pudding stone, it has asymmetrical massing partitioned into polygonal sections. The tower at the northwest corner starts on a square base, rising with differently-shaped sections to a pyramidal roof. Half of the building's original construction cost was paid for by the Gilchrist brothers, owners of the locally prominent Gilchrist Department Store.

The church was listed on the National Register of Historic Places in 1991.

In May 2014, former WBZ-TV anchor Liz Walker was installed as Pastor. She had been "transitional leader" since 2011.

== See also ==
- National Register of Historic Places listings in southern Boston, Massachusetts
- Church Website At Roxbury Presbyterian Church
