= Synod of the Mid-Atlantic =

Organization of the Presbyterian Church (USA)

Synod of the Mid-Atlantic is an upper judicatory of the Presbyterian Church (USA) based in Richmond, Virginia. The synod oversees fourteen presbyteries in DC and five Mid-Atlantic states (Delaware, Maryland, North Carolina, Virginia, and West Virginia).

== Presbyteries of the Synod of the Mid-Atlantic ==
There are 14 presbyteries in the synod.

== See also ==
- Presbyterian polity
