= Presbytery of Albany =

The Presbytery of Albany is a member of the PCUSA Synod of the Northeast. It includes 50 churches with a total of 3,669 members (2022).
