= Presbytery of Northern New England =

The Presbytery of Northern New England is one of the 19 Presbyteries of the Synod of the Northeast of the Presbyterian Church (USA). It oversees 28 congregations with a total of 2,147 members (2022) located in Vermont, New Hampshire, Maine and northeastern Massachusetts.

The Presbytery supports the MATE (Mission at the Eastward)
